= List of international cricket five-wicket hauls by Sydney Barnes =

Sydney Barnes was a professional cricketer who played for England in 27 Test matches between 1901 and 1914. He claimed 24 five-wicket hauls (five or more wickets in an innings) during his Test career. A five-wicket haul is regarded as a notable achievement, and as of October 2024, only 54 bowlers have taken 15 or more five-wicket hauls at international level in their cricketing careers. Barnes had only played seven first-class matches when he was chosen by Archie MacLaren to tour Australia, and played only 47 County Championship matches throughout his entire career, opting to play Minor Counties and Lancashire League cricket instead. He based his decision upon two main criteria – playing club cricket was more financially rewarding, and he was worried about having to bowl too much in first-class county cricket, and suffering from burnout.

Barnes is generally regarded as one of the best bowlers to have played international cricket, and finished his Test career with 189 wickets at an average of 16.43; his average places him among the top-ten bowlers in Test cricket. At the start of his career, he was a fast bowler who endeavoured to swing the ball, which was the common style of bowling at the time. However, Barnes experimented with bowling a little slower and cutting the ball, and developed both an off cutter and a leg cutter that he concluded were far more effective than swinging the ball. Despite his bowling talent, Barnes did not play any Test cricket between July 1902 and December 1907, as he was considered a "prima donna" who would only put in the effort when he was in the right mood, and being suitably paid. After his recall to the England side, he played regularly until the outbreak of the First World War in 1914, and was named by the Wisden Cricketers' Almanack as one of their Cricketers of the Year in 1910.

Barnes made his Test debut in December 1901 against Australia at the Sydney Cricket Ground, and it was in this match that he took his first international five-wicket haul. He claimed five wickets and conceded 65 runs, (noted as five for 65), in the first innings of the match. On his second Test appearance, during the same tour, Barnes collected six wickets in the first innings and seven wickets in the second innings, to complete the first of seven occasions in which he took ten or more wickets in a match. Barnes' best bowling performances were against the South African cricket team in their 1913–14 series in South Africa. In their summary of the tour, Wisden noted that; "his success exceeded all expectation. He was simply irresistible." Barnes took five-wicket hauls in four of the five Test matches on the tour, and claimed ten or more wickets in three of them. (Note: For individual match scorecards see:) During the second Test, he recorded the best figures of his career, collecting eight for 56 in the first innings and nine for 103 in the second. His match figures of 17 for 159 were the best in Test cricket at the time, and though since surpassed by Jim Laker's 19 wickets in 1956, remain second among all bowlers in Tests. That series marked Barnes' final appearances in Test cricket.

== Key ==
- Date – Starting date of the match
- Inn – The innings of the match in which the five-wicket haul was taken
- Overs – Number of overs bowled in that innings
- Runs – Runs conceded
- Wkts – Number of wickets taken
- Econ – Bowling economy rate (average runs per over)
- Batsmen – The batsmen whose wickets were taken in the five-wicket haul
- Won – The match was won by England
- Lost – The match was lost by England
- Drawn – The match was drawn
- * – One of two five-wicket hauls by Barnes in a match
- ‡ – 10 wickets or more taken in the match

== Tests ==
Five-wicket hauls in Test cricket
No.	Date	Ground	Against	Inn	Overs	Runs	Wkts	Econ	Batsmen	Result
1	13 December 1901	Sydney Cricket Ground	Australia	2	35.1	65	5	1.84	Victor Trumper; Clem Hill; Charlie McLeod; Joe Darling; Ernie Jones	Won
2	1 January 1902 * ‡	Melbourne Cricket Ground	Australia	1	16.1	42	6	2.59	Victor Trumper; Clem Hill; Reggie Duff; James Kelly; Bill Howell; Ernie Jones	Lost
3	1 January 1902 * ‡	Melbourne Cricket Ground	Australia	3	64	121	7	1.89	Joe Darling; Hugh Trumble; Bill Howell; Ernie Jones; Syd Gregory; Victor Trumper; Clem Hill	Lost
4	3 July 1902	Bramall Lane, Sheffield	Australia	1	20	49	6	2.45	Reggie Duff; Joe Darling; Clem Hill; Syd Gregory; Bert Hopkins; James Kelly	Lost
5	1 January 1908	Melbourne Cricket Ground	Australia	3	27.4	72	5	2.60	Warwick Armstrong; Charlie Macartney; Vernon Ransford; Gerry Hazlitt; Sammy Carter	Won
6	21 February 1908	Sydney Cricket Ground	Australia	1	22.4	60	7	2.64	Charlie Macartney; Monty Noble; Clem Hill; Victor Trumper; Vernon Ransford; Syd Gregory; Jack Saunders	Lost
7	1 July 1909	Headingley, Leeds	Australia	3	35	63	6	1.80	Peter McAlister; Vernon Ransford; Monty Noble; Victor Trumper; Warren Bardsley; Sammy Carter	Lost
8	26 July 1909	Old Trafford, Manchester	Australia	1	27	56	5	2.07	Warren Bardsley; Vernon Ransford; Victor Trumper; Charlie Macartney; Sammy Carter	Drawn
9	30 December 1911	Melbourne Cricket Ground	Australia	1	23	44	5	1.91	Warren Bardsley; Charles Kelleway; Clem Hill; Warwick Armstrong; Roy Minnett	Won
10	12 January 1912	Adelaide Oval	Australia	3	46.4	105	5	2.25	Clem Hill; Roy Minnett; H. V. Hordern; Jimmy Matthews; Tibby Cotter	Won
11	9 February 1912	Melbourne Cricket Ground	Australia	1	29.1	74	5	2.53	H. V. Hordern; Warwick Armstrong; Clem Hill; Jimmy Matthews; Tibby Cotter	Won
12	10 June 1912 * ‡	Lord's, London	South Africa	1	13	25	5	1.92	Gerald Hartigan; Herbie Taylor; Frank Mitchell; Tip Snooke; Reggie Schwarz	Won
13	10 June 1912 * ‡	Lord's, London	South Africa	3	34	85	6	2.50	Herbie Taylor; Aubrey Faulkner; Frank Mitchell; Sid Pegler; Reggie Schwarz; Tom Campbell	Won
14	8 July 1912 ‡	Headingley, Leeds	South Africa	2	22	52	6	2.36	Louis Tancred; Dave Nourse; Charlie Llewellyn; Aubrey Faulkner; Tip Snooke; Claude Carter	Won
15	12 August 1912 * ‡	Kennington Oval, London	South Africa	1	21	28	5	1.33	Louis Tancred; Louis Stricker; Aubrey Faulkner; Gordon White; Rolland Beaumont	Won
16	12 August 1912 * ‡	Kennington Oval, London	South Africa	3	16.4	29	8	1.74	Herbie Taylor; Louis Stricker; Aubrey Faulkner; Charlie Llewellyn; Gordon White; Tip Snooke; Rolland Beaumont; Sid Pegler	Won
17	19 August 1912	Kennington Oval, London	Australia	2	27	30	5	1.11	Syd Gregory; Charles Macartney; Warren Bardsley; Jimmy Matthews; Bill Whitty	Won
18	13 December 1913 * ‡	Lord's, Durban	South Africa	1	19.4	57	5	2.89	Gerald Hartigan; Plum Lewis; Alfred Cooper; George Tapscott; Joe Cox	Won
19	13 December 1913 * ‡	Lord's, Durban	South Africa	3	25	48	5	1.92	Herbie Taylor; Plum Lewis; Alfred Cooper; Dave Nourse; Tommy Ward	Won
20	26 December 1913 * ‡	Old Wanderers, Johannesburg	South Africa	1	26.5	56	8	2.08	Billy Zulch; Philip Hands; Rolland Beaumont; Dave Nourse; Herbie Taylor; Louis Tancred; Claude Newberry; Joe Cox	Won
21	26 December 1913 * ‡	Old Wanderers, Johannesburg	South Africa	3	38.4	103	9	2.66	Herbie Taylor; Billy Zulch; Gerald Hartigan; Philip Hands; Dave Nourse; Tommy Ward; Louis Tancred; Claude Newberry; Joe Cox	Won
22	1 January 1914	Old Wanderers, Johannesburg	South Africa	4	38	102	5	2.68	Philip Hands; Rolland Beaumont; Dave Nourse; Gerald Hartigan; Claude Newberry	Won
23	14 February 1914 * ‡	Lord's, Durban	South Africa	1	29.5	56	7	1.87	Herbie Taylor; Tommy Ward; Dave Nourse; Fred le Roux; Dan Taylor; Horace Chapman; Joe Cox	Drawn
24	14 February 1914 * ‡	Lord's, Durban	South Africa	3	32	88	7	2.75	Tommy Ward; Dan Taylor; Herbie Taylor; Fred le Roux; Philip Hands; Claude Newberry; Jimmy Blanckenberg	Drawn

== Notes and references ==
Notes
