= English cricket team in South Africa in 1913–14 =

International cricket tour

The English cricket team in South Africa in 1913–14 was organised by Marylebone Cricket Club (MCC). The team played as MCC in the non-Test fixtures and as England in the five Test matches. They played 18 first-class matches including the Tests, winning 9 times with 8 draws and 1 defeat.

England was captained by Johnny Douglas. South Africa's captain in the Test series was Herbie Taylor. The series is notable for the exceptional bowling of England's Sydney Barnes, and the determined batting of South Africa skipper Herbie Taylor. It would be the last Test series to be played until after World War I, when England toured Australia in December 1920.

== English team ==
- Johnny Douglas (captain)
- Sydney Barnes
- Morice Bird
- Major Booth
- Jack Hearne
- Jack Hobbs
- Phil Mead
- Albert Relf
- Wilfred Rhodes
- Tiger Smith
- Herbert Strudwick
- Lionel Tennyson
- Frank Woolley

== Test series summary ==
England won the Test series 4–0 with one match drawn.

Match length: 4 days (excluding Sundays). Balls per over: 6.

=== First Test ===
13–17 December 1913
Scorecard

South Africa	v	England
182 (56.4 overs); HW Taylor 109; SF Barnes 5/57 (19.4 overs)		450 (144.4 overs); JWHT Douglas 119; AW Nourse 2/74 (29 overs)
111 (52.2 overs); AW Nourse 46; SF Barnes 5/48 (25 overs)

England won by an innings and 157 runs
Lord's, Durban
Umpires: AJ Atfield and FW Grey

- South Africa won the toss and elected to bat.
- 16 December was taken as a rest day
- PAM Hands, PT Lewis, AHC Cooper, GL Tapscott, HV Baumgartner, JM Blanckenberg and JL Cox (all SA), and Hon. LH Tennyson and MW Booth (both ENG) made their Test debuts.

=== Second Test ===
26–30 December 1913
Scorecard

South Africa	v	England
160 (62.5 overs); GPD Hartigan 51; SF Barnes 8/56 (26.5 overs)		403 (135 overs); W Rhodes 152; JM Blanckenberg 5/83 (38 overs)
231 (83.4 overs); AW Nourse 56; SF Barnes 9/103 (38.4 overs)

England won by an innings and 12 runs
Old Wanderers, Johannesburg
Umpires: AJ Atfield and FW Grey

- South Africa won the toss and elected to bat.
- 28 December was taken as a rest day
- C Newberry (SA) made his Test debut.

=== Third Test ===
1–5 January 1914
Scorecard

England	v	South Africa
238 (80.1 overs); JB Hobbs 92; HW Taylor 3/15 (10 overs)		151 (61.5 overs); JW Zulch 38; JW Hearne 5/49 (16 overs)
308 (93.3 overs); CP Mead 86; C Newberry 4/72 (22 overs)		304 (109.4 overs); JW Zulch 82; SF Barnes 5/102 (38 overs)

England won by 91 runs
Old Wanderers, Johannesburg
Umpires: AJ Atfield and FW Grey

- England won the toss and elected to bat.
- 4 January was taken as a rest day
- CD Dixon and LR Tuckett (both SA) made their Test debuts.

=== Fourth Test ===
14–18 February 1914
Scorecard

South Africa	v	England
170 (68.5 overs); PAM Hands 51; SF Barnes 7/56 (29.5 overs)		163 (75 overs); JB Hobbs 64; CP Carter 6/50 (28 overs)
305/9 d (102 overs); HW Taylor 93; SF Barnes 7/88 (32 overs)		154/5 (80 overs); JB Hobbs 97; JM Blanckenberg 3/43 (15 overs)

Match drawn
Lord's, Durban
Umpires: AJ Atfield and FW Grey

- South Africa won the toss and elected to bat.
- 15 February was taken as a rest day.
- D Taylor, FL le Roux and HW Chapman (all SA) made their Test debuts.

=== Fifth Test ===
27 February–3 March 1914
Scorecard

South Africa	v	England
193 (65.4 overs); PAM Hands 83; JWHT Douglas 4/14 (5.4 overs)		411 (144.3 overs); CP Mead 117; EB Lundie 4/101 (46.3 overs)
228 (95.1 overs); HW Taylor 87; MW Booth 4/49 (24 overs)		11/0 (2.1 overs); JB Hobbs 11*

England won by 10 wickets
St George's Park, Port Elizabeth
Umpires: FW Grey and DJ Smith

- South Africa won the toss and elected to bat.
- 1 March was taken as a rest day
- RHM Hands and EB Lundie (both SA) made their Test debuts.
- After taking 49 wickets at an average of 10.93 in the first four Tests, SF Barnes declined to play due to a "difference of opinion" with the England team management.

== External sources ==
- Wisden Online 1915
- England to South Africa 1913-14 at Test Cricket Tours

== Annual reviews ==
- Wisden Cricketers' Almanack 1915
