= List of Test cricket hat-tricks =

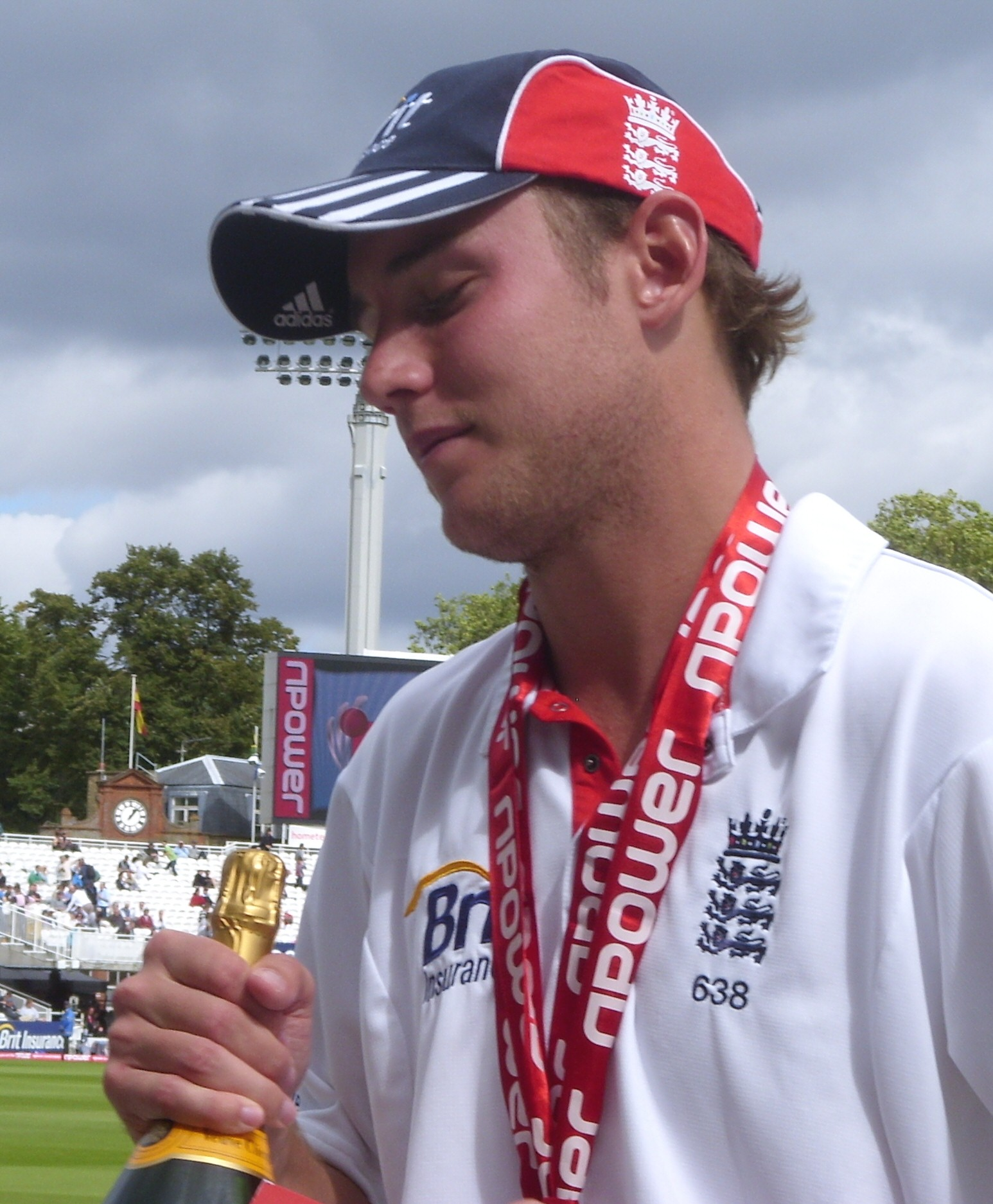
England cricketer Stuart Broad took hat-tricks against India at Trent Bridge in 2011, and against Sri Lanka at Headingley in 2014.

In cricket, a hat-trick occurs when a bowler takes a wicket with each of three consecutive deliveries. Although hat-tricks can carry over between innings, meaning a batter can be dismissed twice as part of the same hat-trick, they do not carry over between matches. As of October 2026, this feat has only been achieved 50 times, by 46 different bowlers, in more than 2,000 men's Test matches, the form of the sport in which national representative teams compete in matches of up to five days' duration.

The first Test hat-trick was recorded on 2 January 1879, in only the third Test match to take place, by the Australia pace bowler Fred Spofforth, nicknamed "The Demon Bowler", who dismissed three England batters with consecutive deliveries at the Melbourne Cricket Ground. The most recent Test hat-trick was taken by Scott Boland in July 2025.

This article relates to men's cricket only. There have been three hat-tricks in women's Test cricket.

== Notable Test hat-tricks ==
=== Bowlers with multiple Test hat-tricks ===
A player has taken two hat-tricks in the same Test match only once. Playing for Australia against South Africa in the first match of the 1912 Triangular Tournament at Old Trafford, Manchester, England, leg spinner Jimmy Matthews took a hat-trick in South Africa's first and second innings, both taken on 28 May 1912. He completed both hat-tricks by dismissing South Africa's Tommy Ward.

Only three other cricketers have taken more than one Test hat-trick: Australian off spinner Hugh Trumble (two years apart, between the same teams at the same ground), Pakistan fast bowler Wasim Akram (just over a week apart, in consecutive matches between the same teams) and England fast bowler Stuart Broad.

=== Test hat-tricks spread over two innings ===
Australian Merv Hughes is the only bowler to take a hat-trick where the wickets fell over three overs. This was at WACA, Perth in 1988. He took a wicket (Curtly Ambrose) with the final ball of an over. With the first ball of his next over he took the final wicket of the West Indies innings (Patrick Patterson). He then removed the opener Gordon Greenidge with the first ball of the West Indies second innings. Even more unusually, Hughes's two first-innings wickets were not consecutive, since Tim May had bowled an over himself in between Hughes's two deliveries, and took the wicket of Gus Logie.

Two other hat-tricks have taken place over two innings rather than one, both taken by West Indians against Australia – Courtney Walsh and Jermaine Lawson. Walsh's, at the Gabba in 1988, was unusual since, like Hughes' (which was in the very next Test in the series), other wickets fell between the beginning and end of the hat-trick. After dismissing Dodemaide to finish off Australia's first innings, Walsh did not open the bowling in the Australian second innings, and in fact did not bowl until Australia had already lost two wickets and were 65 for 2: then with his first two deliveries he dismissed Wood and Veletta. Lawson's hat trick was at the Kensington Oval in 2003. He removed tail-enders Lee and MacGill in successive deliveries before Australia declared their first innings (at 605/9), and then took the wicket of Langer with the first delivery of Australia's second innings.

=== Other notable Test hat-tricks ===
- Three players have taken a hat-trick on their Test debut: English medium pace bowler Maurice Allom in 1930, New Zealand off-spinner Peter Petherick in 1976, and Australian pace bowler Damien Fleming in 1994.
- Alok Kapali took the fewest total Test wickets of any player who recorded a hat-trick, taking only six wickets in his entire Test career.
- Australian Peter Siddle is the only bowler to take a hat-trick on his birthday.
- Bangladeshi off spinner Sohag Gazi is the only male player to score a century and take a hat-trick in the same Test match.
- Sri Lankan seamer Nuwan Zoysa became the first player in the history to take a hat-trick off their first three balls of a Test match. He achieved this against Zimbabwe at Harare in November 1999, dismissing Trevor Gripper, Murray Goodwin and Neil Johnson.
- Indian pacer Irfan Pathan is the first bowler to take a hat-trick in the first over of a Test match, against Pakistan in 2006.

In the five-match series between a Rest of the World XI and England in 1970, a hat-trick was taken by South African Eddie Barlow in the fourth match, at Headingley (the last three of four wickets in five balls). These matches were considered to be Tests at the time, but that status was later removed.

== Test hat-tricks ==
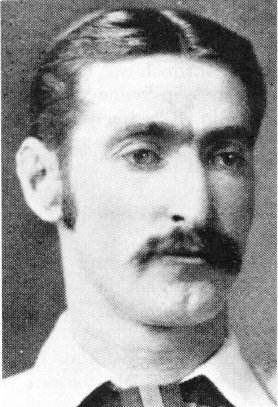
Australia bowler Fred Spofforth took the first hat-trick in Test cricket on 2 January 1879, in only the third Test match.

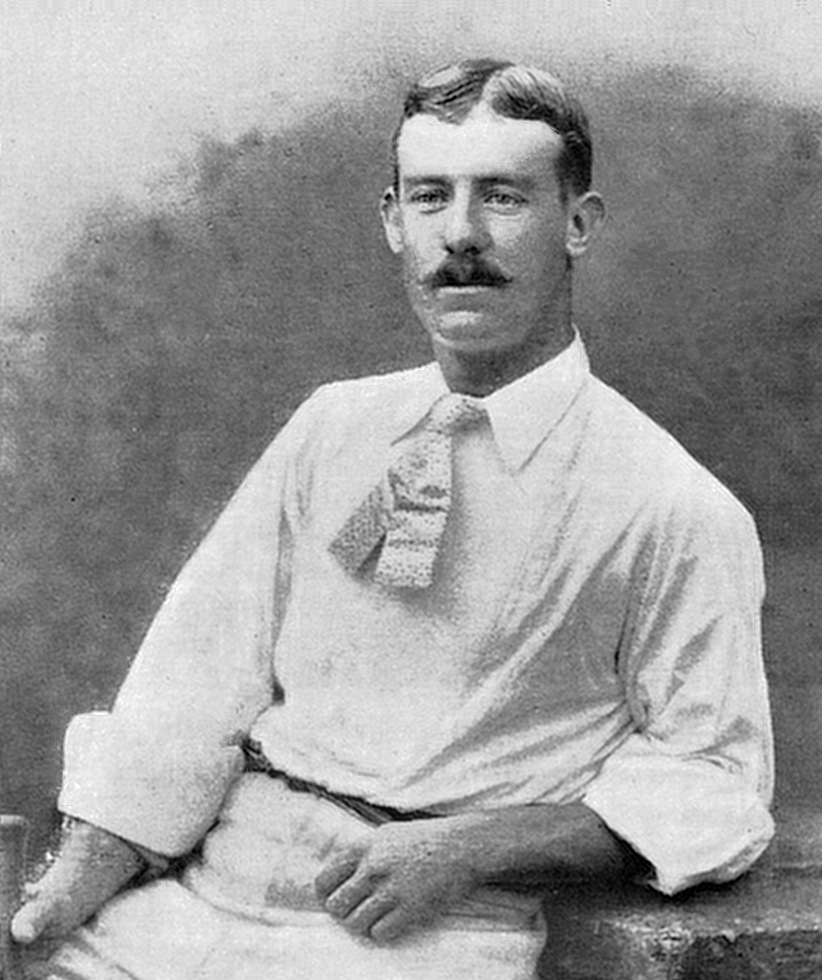
Billy Bates was the first player to take a hat-trick for England, four years after Spofforth achieved the feat.

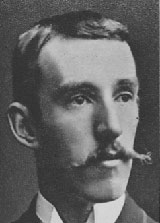
Hugh Trumble is one of only four players to take more than one Test hat-trick, achieving the feat in 1902 and 1904.

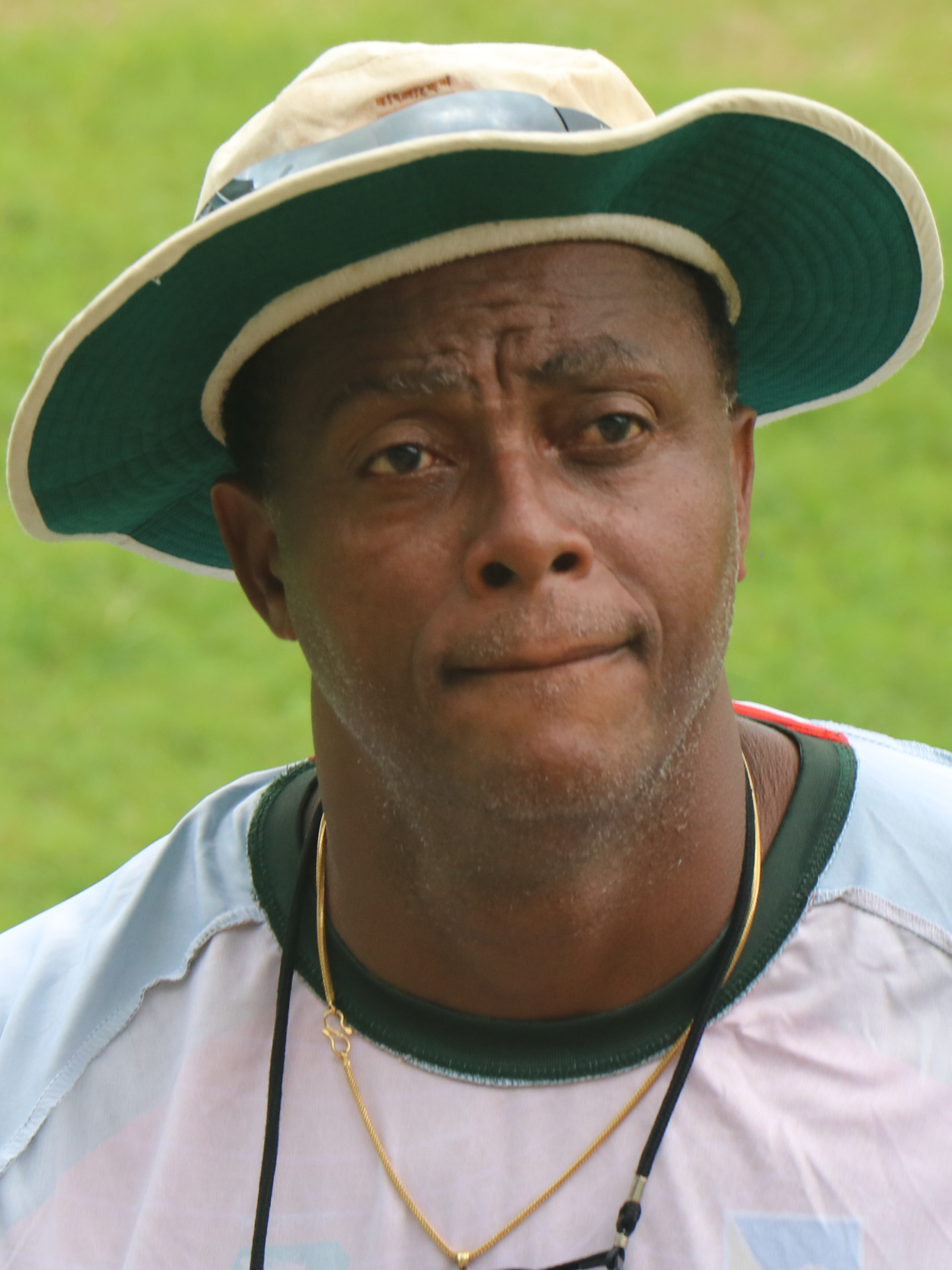
Courtney Walsh's hat-trick in 1988 was spread across two innings. In Australia's first innings he dismissed the last two batters with consecutive deliveries and then took a third wicket with the first ball of the second innings.

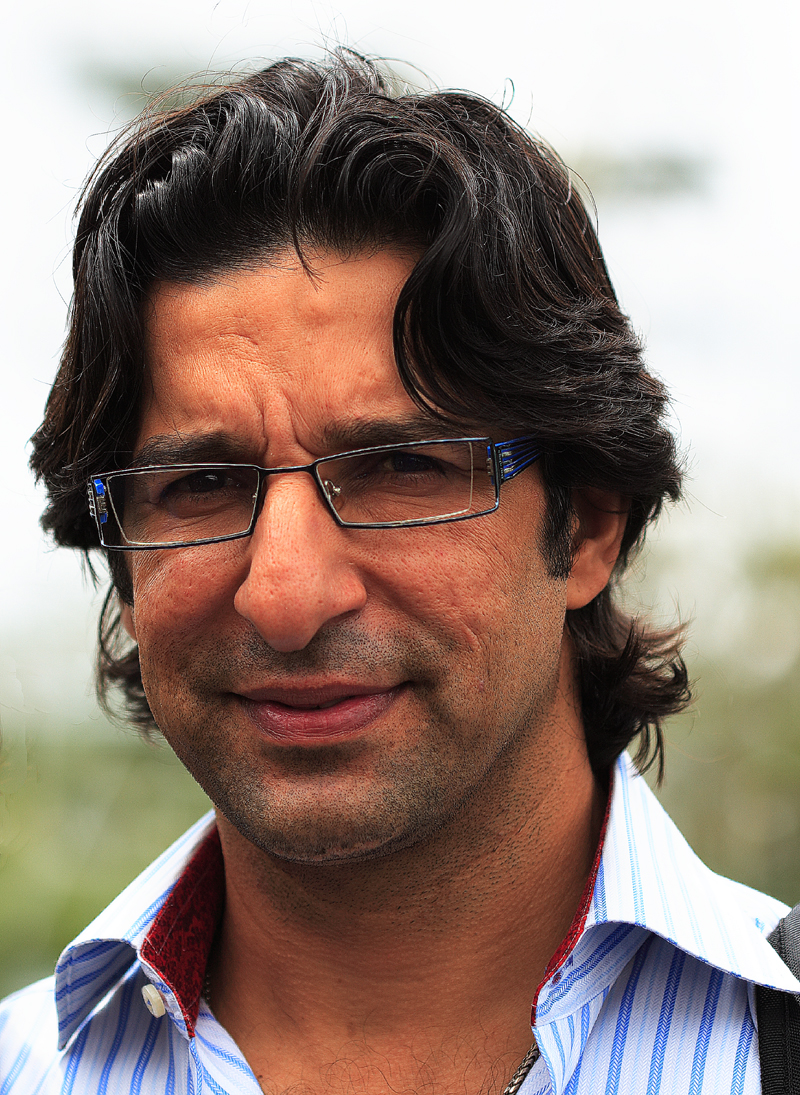
Wasim Akram took two hat-tricks over a span of nine days in 1999.

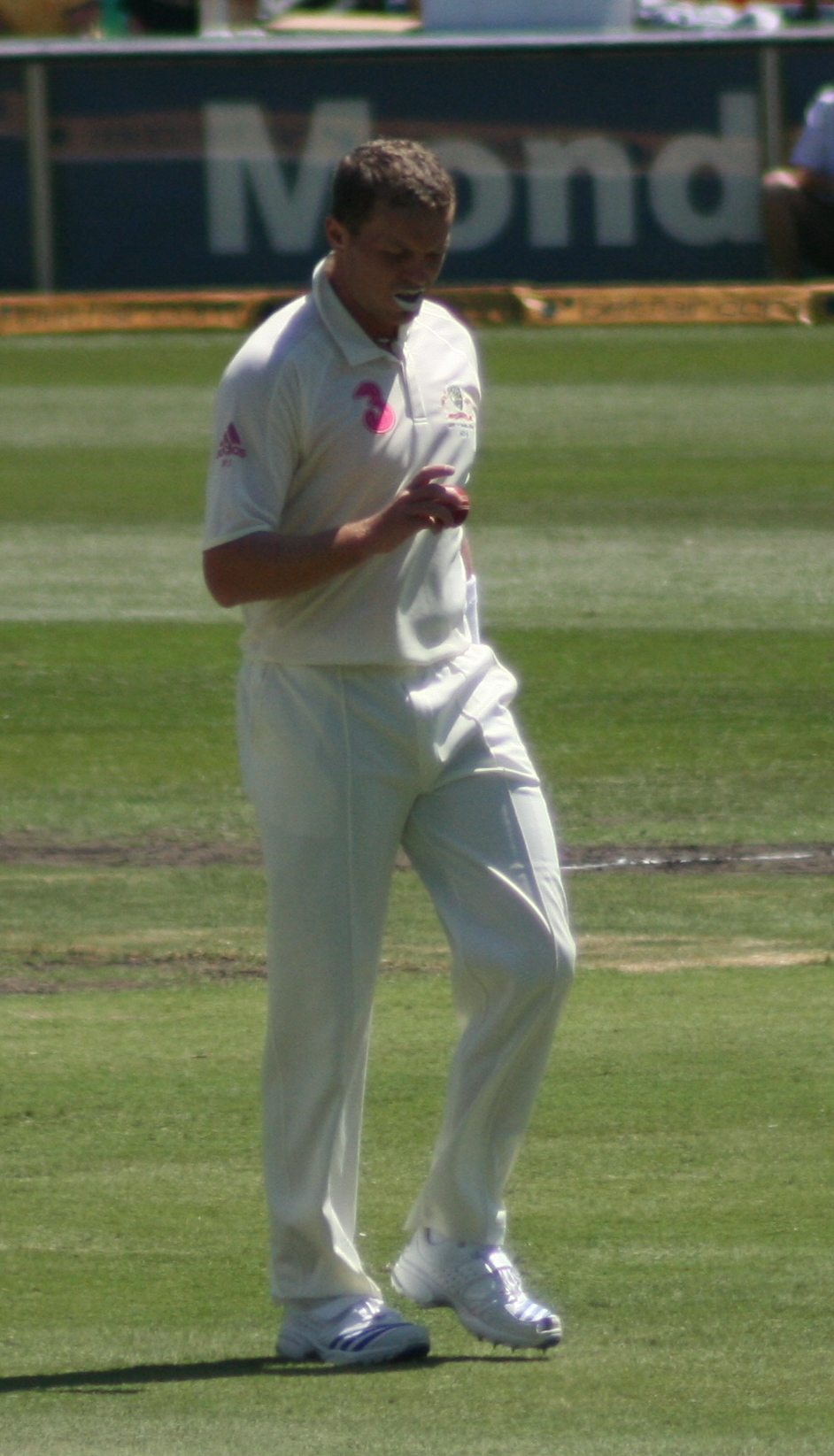
When Peter Siddle took a hat-trick for Australia in 2010, his final victim was Stuart Broad. Nine months later Broad himself would be the next man to take a Test match hat-trick.

Key
Symbol	Meaning
	Hat-trick taken in debut match
Bowler	The name of the bowler
For	The team for which the bowler was playing
Against	The team against which the bowler was playing
Inn.	The innings (first or second) in which the hat-trick was achieved
Test	The number of the Test within the overall series between the two teams
Dismissals	The three players dismissed by the bowler
Venue	The venue where the hat-trick was achieved
Date	The date on which the hat-trick was achieved
Ref.	Reference

List of Test cricket hat-tricks
No.	Bowler	For	Against	Inn.	Test	Dismissals	Venue	Date	Ref.
1	Fred Spofforth	Australia	England	1	1/1	Vernon Royle (b); Francis MacKinnon (b); Tom Emmett (c Tom Horan)	(Australia) MCG, Melbourne	2 January 1879	
2	Billy Bates	England	Australia	1	2/3	Percy McDonnell (b); George Giffen (c and b); George Bonnor (c Walter Read)	(Australia) MCG, Melbourne	20 January 1883	
3	Johnny Briggs	England	Australia	2	2/3	Walter Giffen (b); Jack Blackham (lbw); Sydney Callaway (c W. G. Grace)	(Australia) Sydney Cricket Ground, Sydney	2 February 1892	
4	George Lohmann	England	South Africa	2	1/3	Frederick Cook (b); Bonnor Middleton (b); Joseph Willoughby (c Tom Hayward)	(South Africa) St. George's Park, Port Elizabeth	14 February 1896	
5	Jack Hearne	England	Australia	2	3/5	Clem Hill (b); Syd Gregory (c Archie MacLaren); Monty Noble (c Ranjitsinhji)	(England) Headingley, Leeds	30 June 1899	
6	Hugh Trumble (1/2)	Australia	England	2	2/5	John Gunn (c Sammy Jones); Arthur Jones (c Joe Darling); Sydney Barnes (c and b)	(Australia) MCG, Melbourne	4 January 1902	
7	Hugh Trumble (2/2)	Australia	England	2	5/5	Bernard Bosanquet (c Algy Gehrs); Plum Warner (c and b); Dick Lilley (lbw)	(Australia) MCG, Melbourne	8 March 1904	
8	Jimmy Matthews (1/2)	Australia	South Africa	1	1/3	Rolland Beaumont (b); Sid Pegler (lbw); Tommy Ward (lbw)	(England) Old Trafford, Manchester	28 May 1912	
9	Jimmy Matthews (2/2)	Australia	South Africa	2	1/3	Herbie Taylor (b); Reggie Schwarz (c and b); Tommy Ward (c and b)	(England) Old Trafford, Manchester	28 May 1912	
10	Maurice Allom	England	New Zealand	1	1/4	Tom Lowry (lbw); Ken James (c Tich Cornford); Ted Badcock (b)	(New Zealand) Lancaster Park, Christchurch	10 January 1930	
11	Tom Goddard	England	South Africa	1	1/5	Dudley Nourse (c and b); Norman Gordon (st Les Ames); Billy Wade (b)	(South Africa) Old Wanderers, Johannesburg	26 December 1938	
12	Peter Loader	England	West Indies	1	4/5	John Goddard (b); Sonny Ramadhin (c Fred Trueman); Roy Gilchrist (b)	(England) Headingley, Leeds	25 July 1957	
13	Lindsay Kline	Australia	South Africa	2	2/5	Eddie Fuller (c Richie Benaud); Hugh Tayfield (lbw); Neil Adcock (c Bob Simpson)	(South Africa) Newlands, Cape Town	3 January 1958	
14	Wes Hall	West Indies	Pakistan	1	3/3	Mushtaq Mohammed (lbw); Fazal Mahmood (c Garfield Sobers); Nasim-ul-Ghani (b)	(Pakistan) Bagh-e-Jinnah, Lahore	29 March 1959	
15	Geoff Griffin	South Africa	England	1	2/5	M. J. K. Smith (c John Waite); Peter Walker (b); Fred Trueman (b)	(England) Lord's, London	24 June 1960	
16	Lance Gibbs	West Indies	Australia	1	4/5	Ken Mackay (lbw); Wally Grout (c Garfield Sobers); Frank Misson (b)	(Australia) Adelaide Oval, Adelaide	30 January 1961	
17	Peter Petherick	New Zealand	Pakistan	1	1/3	Javed Miandad (c Richard Hadlee); Wasim Raja (c and b); Intikhab Alam (c Geoff Howarth)	(Pakistan) Gaddafi Stadium, Lahore	9 October 1976	
18	Courtney Walsh	West Indies	Australia	1 & 2	1/5	Tony Dodemaide (c Viv Richards); Mike Veletta (c Carl Hooper); Graeme Wood (lbw)	(Australia) The Gabba, Brisbane	18–20 November 1988	
19	Merv Hughes	Australia	West Indies	1 & 2	2/5	Curtly Ambrose (c Ian Healy); Patrick Patterson (c Tony Dodemaide); Gordon Greenidge (lbw)	(Australia) WACA, Perth	3–4 December 1988	
20	Damien Fleming	Australia	Pakistan	2	2/3	Aamer Malik (c Michael Bevan); Inzamam-ul-Haq (lbw); Saleem Malik (c Ian Healy)	(Pakistan) Rawalpindi Cricket Stadium, Rawalpindi	9 October 1994	
21	Shane Warne	Australia	England	2	2/5	Phil DeFreitas (lbw); Darren Gough (c Ian Healy); Devon Malcolm (c David Boon)	(Australia) MCG, Melbourne	29 December 1994	
22	Dominic Cork	England	West Indies	2	4/6	Richie Richardson (b); Junior Murray (lbw); Carl Hooper (lbw)	(England) Old Trafford, Manchester	30 July 1995	
23	Darren Gough	England	Australia	1	5/5	Ian Healy (c Warren Hegg); Stuart MacGill (b); Colin Miller (b)	(Australia) Sydney Cricket Ground, Sydney	2 January 1999	
24	Wasim Akram (1/2)	Pakistan	Sri Lanka	1	3/4	Romesh Kaluwitharana (c Moin Khan); Niroshan Bandaratilleke (b); Pramodya Wickramasinghe (b)	(Pakistan) Gaddafi Stadium, Lahore	6 March 1999	
25	Wasim Akram (2/2)	Pakistan	Sri Lanka	2	4/4	Avishka Gunawardene (c Shahid Afridi); Chaminda Vaas (b); Mahela Jayawardene (c Wajahatullah Wasti)	(Bangladesh) Bangabandhu National Stadium, Dhaka	14 March 1999	
26	Nuwan Zoysa	Sri Lanka	Zimbabwe	1	2/3	Trevor Gripper (lbw); Murray Goodwin (c Romesh Kaluwitharana); Neil Johnson (lbw)	(Zimbabwe) Harare Sports Club, Harare	26 November 1999	
27	Abdul Razzaq	Pakistan	Sri Lanka	1	2/3	Romesh Kaluwitharana (c Moin Khan); Rangana Herath (lbw); Ravi Pushpakumara (lbw)	(Sri Lanka) Galle International Stadium, Galle	21 June 2000	
28	Glenn McGrath	Australia	West Indies	1	2/5	Sherwin Campbell (c Ricky Ponting); Brian Lara (c Stuart MacGill); Jimmy Adams (c Justin Langer)	(Australia) WACA, Perth	1 December 2000	
29	Harbhajan Singh	India	Australia	1	2/3	Ricky Ponting (lbw); Adam Gilchrist (lbw); Shane Warne (c Sadagoppan Ramesh)	(India) Eden Gardens, Calcutta	11 March 2001	
30	Mohammad Sami	Pakistan	Sri Lanka	1	3/3	Charitha Buddhika (lbw); Nuwan Zoysa (lbw); Muttiah Muralitharan (b)	(Pakistan) Gaddafi Stadium, Lahore	8 March 2002	
31	Jermaine Lawson	West Indies	Australia	1 & 2	3/4	Brett Lee (b); Stuart MacGill (b); Justin Langer (lbw)	(Barbados) Kensington Oval, Bridgetown	2–5 May 2003	
32	Alok Kapali	Bangladesh	Pakistan	1	2/3	Shabbir Ahmed (c Mashrafe Mortaza); Danish Kaneria (lbw); Umar Gul (lbw)	(Pakistan) Arbab Niaz Stadium, Peshawar	29 August 2003	
33	Andy Blignaut	Zimbabwe	Bangladesh	2	1/2	Hannan Sarkar (lbw); Mohammad Ashraful (c sub (Travis Friend)); Mushfiqur Rahman (c Tatenda Taibu)	(Zimbabwe) Harare Sports Club, Harare	22 February 2004	
34	Matthew Hoggard	England	West Indies	2	3/4	Ramnaresh Sarwan (c Ashley Giles); Shivnarine Chanderpaul (lbw); Ryan Hinds (c Andrew Flintoff)	(Barbados) Kensington Oval, Bridgetown	3 April 2004	
35	James Franklin	New Zealand	Bangladesh	1	1/2	Manjural Islam Rana (c Brendon McCullum); Mohammad Rafique (c Scott Styris); Tapash Baisya (b)	(Bangladesh) Bangabandhu National Stadium, Dhaka	20 October 2004	
36	Irfan Pathan	India	Pakistan	1	3/3	Salman Butt (c Rahul Dravid); Younis Khan (lbw); Mohammad Yousuf (b)	(Pakistan) National Stadium, Karachi	29 January 2006	
37	Ryan Sidebottom	England	New Zealand	2	1/3	Stephen Fleming (c Alastair Cook); Mathew Sinclair (c Alastair Cook); Jacob Oram (lbw)	(New Zealand) Seddon Park, Hamilton	8 March 2008	
38	Peter Siddle	Australia	England	1	1/5	Alastair Cook (c Shane Watson); Matt Prior (b); Stuart Broad (lbw)	(Australia) Brisbane Cricket Ground, Brisbane	25 November 2010	
39	Stuart Broad (1/2)	England	India	1	2/4	Mahendra Singh Dhoni (c James Anderson); Harbhajan Singh (lbw); Praveen Kumar (b)	(England) Trent Bridge, Nottingham	30 July 2011	
40	Sohag Gazi	Bangladesh	New Zealand	2	1/2	Corey Anderson (lbw); BJ Watling (c Mushfiqur Rahim); Doug Bracewell (c Shakib Al Hasan)	(Bangladesh) Zahur Ahmed Chowdhury Stadium, Chittagong	13 October 2013	
41	Stuart Broad (2/2)	England	Sri Lanka	1	2/2	Kumar Sangakkara (c Ian Bell); Dinesh Chandimal (c Alastair Cook); Shaminda Eranga (c Matt Prior)	(England) Headingley, Leeds	20 June 2014	
42	Rangana Herath	Sri Lanka	Australia	1	2/3	Adam Voges (c Dimuth Karunaratne); Peter Nevill (lbw); Mitchell Starc (lbw)	(Sri Lanka) Galle International Stadium, Galle	5 August 2016	
43	Moeen Ali	England	South Africa	2	3/4	Dean Elgar (c Ben Stokes); Kagiso Rabada (c Ben Stokes); Morné Morkel (lbw)	(England) The Oval, London	31 July 2017	
44	Jasprit Bumrah	India	West Indies	1	2/2	Darren Bravo (c KL Rahul); Shamarh Brooks (lbw); Roston Chase (lbw)	(Jamaica) Sabina Park, Kingston	31 August 2019	
45	Naseem Shah	Pakistan	Bangladesh	2	1/2	Nazmul Hossain Shanto (lbw); Taijul Islam (lbw); Mahmudullah Riyad (c Haris Sohail)	(Pakistan) Rawalpindi Cricket Stadium, Rawalpindi	9 February 2020	
46	Keshav Maharaj	South Africa	West Indies	2	2/2	Kieran Powell (c Anrich Nortje); Jason Holder (c Keegan Petersen); Joshua Da Silva (c Wiaan Mulder)	(Saint Lucia) Daren Sammy Cricket Ground, Gros Islet	21 June 2021	
47	Gus Atkinson	England	New Zealand	1	2/3	Nathan Smith (b); Matt Henry (c Ben Duckett); Tim Southee (lbw)	(New Zealand) Basin Reserve, Wellington	7 December 2024	
48	Noman Ali	Pakistan	West Indies	1	2/2	Justin Greaves (c Babar Azam); Tevin Imlach (lbw); Kevin Sinclair (c Babar Azam)	(Pakistan) Multan Cricket Stadium, Multan	25 January 2025	
49	Scott Boland	Australia	West Indies	2	3/3	Justin Greaves (c Beau Webster); Shamar Joseph (lbw); Jomel Warrican (b)	(Jamaica) Sabina Park, Kingston	14 July 2025	
50	Hasan Mahumud	Bangladesh	Afghanistan	1	1/1	Ismat Alam (b); Qais Ahmad (c Litton Das); Zia-ur-Rehman (lbw)	(United Arab Emirates) Sheikh Zayed Cricket Stadium, Abu Dhabi	11 October 2026	

== By team ==
England and Australia combined have taken over half of all Test match hat-tricks to date, 27 of 49.

Test hat-tricks by team
Team	Hat-tricks	No. of bowlers
England	15	14
Australia	12	10
Pakistan	6	5
West Indies	4	4
India	3	3
Bangladesh	3	3
New Zealand	2	2
South Africa	2	2
Sri Lanka	2	2
Zimbabwe	1	1
Total	50	46

== By bowler ==
Bowlers with multiple hat-tricks
Bowler	Hat-tricks
(Australia) Hugh Trumble	2
(Australia) Jimmy Matthews	2
(Pakistan) Wasim Akram	2
(England) Stuart Broad	2

== By type of bowling ==
Test hat-tricks by type of bowling
Bowling type	Hat-tricks	Sub-type	Hat-tricks	Bowlers
Fast bowling	32	Right-arm fast	26	Fred Spofforth, George Lohmann, Jack Hearne, Maurice Allom, Peter Loader, Wes Hall, Geoff Griffin, Courtney Walsh, Merv Hughes, Damien Fleming, Dominic Cork, Darren Gough, Abdul Razzaq, Glenn McGrath, Mohammad Sami, Jermaine Lawson, Andy Blignaut, Matthew Hoggard, Peter Siddle, Stuart Broad (2), Jasprit Bumrah, Naseem Shah, Gus Atkinson, Scott Boland, Hasan Mahmud
Fast bowling	32	Left-arm fast	6	Wasim Akram (2), Nuwan Zoysa, James Franklin, Irfan Pathan, Ryan Sidebottom
Spin bowling	18	Off spin	9	Billy Bates, Hugh Trumble (2), Tom Goddard, Lance Gibbs, Peter Petherick, Harbhajan Singh, Sohag Gazi, Moeen Ali
Spin bowling	18	Leg spin	4	Jimmy Matthews (2), Shane Warne, Alok Kapali
Spin bowling	18	Left-arm orthodox spin	4	Noman Ali, Johnny Briggs, Rangana Herath, Keshav Maharaj
Spin bowling	18	Left-arm unorthodox spin	1	Lindsay Kline
Total	50		50	

== By ground ==
Grounds involved in multiple Test hat-tricks
Ground	Hat-tricks
(Australia) Melbourne Cricket Ground, Melbourne	5
(Pakistan) Gaddafi Stadium, Lahore	3
(England) Headingley, Leeds	3
(England) Old Trafford, Manchester	3
(Pakistan) Rawalpindi Cricket Stadium, Rawalpindi	2
(Bangladesh) Bangabandhu Stadium, Dhaka	2
(Australia) The Gabba, Brisbane	2
(Sri Lanka) Galle International Stadium, Galle	2
(Barbados) Kensington Oval, Bridgetown	2
(Zimbabwe) Harare Sports Club, Harare	2
(Australia) Sydney Cricket Ground, Sydney	2
(Australia) WACA Ground, Perth	2
(Jamaica) Sabina Park, Kingston	2

== See also ==
- List of One Day International cricket hat-tricks
- List of Twenty20 International cricket hat-tricks
- List of women's international cricket hat-tricks
