= International cricket in 1921–22 =

International cricket season

The 1921–22 international cricket season was from September 1921 to April 1922. The season consists with one major international tour.

== Season overview ==
International tours
Start date	Home team	Away team	Results [Matches]			
Start date	Home team	Away team	Test	ODI	FC	LA
5 November 1921	South Africa	Australia	0–1 [3]	—	—	—

== November ==
=== Australia in South Africa ===
Test series
No.	Date	Home captain	Away captain	Venue	Result
Test 145	5–9 November	Herbie Taylor	Herbie Collins	Lord's No. 1 Ground, Durban	Match drawn
Test 146	12–16 November	Herbie Taylor	Herbie Collins	Old Wanderers, Johannesburg	Match drawn
Test 147	26–29 November	Herbie Taylor	Herbie Collins	Newlands, Cape Town	Australia by 10 wickets
