= International cricket in 1913–14 =

International cricket season

The 1913–14 international cricket season was from September 1913 to April 1914.

== Season overview ==
International tours
Start date	Home team	Away team	Results [Matches]			
Start date	Home team	Away team	Test	ODI	FC	LA
13 December 1913	South Africa	England	0–4 [5]	—	—	—
19 December 1913	Australia	New Zealand	—	—	2–1 [4]	—
6 March 1914	New Zealand	Australia	—	—	0–2 [2]	—

== December ==
=== England in South Africa ===
Test series
No.	Date	Home captain	Away captain	Venue	Result
Test 130	13–17 December	Herbie Taylor	Johnny Douglas	Lord's No. 1 Ground, Cape Town	England by an innings and 157 runs
Test 131	26–30 December	Herbie Taylor	Johnny Douglas	Old Wanderers, Johannesburg	England by an innings and 12 runs
Test 132	1–5 January	Herbie Taylor	Johnny Douglas	Old Wanderers, Johannesburg	England by 91 runs
Test 133	14–18 February	Herbie Taylor	Johnny Douglas	Lord's No. 1 Ground, Cape Town	Match drawn
Test 134	27 Feb–3 March	Herbie Taylor	Johnny Douglas	Crusaders Ground, Durban	England by 10 wickets

=== New Zealand in Australia ===
First-class Series
No.	Date	Home captain	Away captain	Venue	Result
Match 1	19–22 December	(Queensland) William Evans	Dan Reese	The Gabba, Brisbane	New Zealand by 12 runs
Match 2	26–27 November	(New South Wales) Victor Trumper	Dan Reese	Sydney Cricket Ground, Sydney	New South Wales by an innings and 247 runs
Match 3	9–10 January	(Victoria (state)) Warwick Armstrong	Dan Reese	Melbourne Cricket Ground, Melbourne	Victoria by an innings and 110 runs
Match 4	16–19 January	(South Australia) Clem Hill	Dan Reese	Adelaide Oval, Adelaide	Match drawn

== March ==
=== Australia in New Zealand ===
Three-day Match Series
No.	Date	Home captain	Away captain	Venue	Result
Test 186	6–9 March	Dan Reese	Monty Noble	Carisbrook, Dunedin	Sims' Australia XI by won by 7 wickets
Test 190	27–30 March	Lancelot Hemus	Arthur Sims	Eden Park, Auckland	Sims' Australia XI by an innings and 113 runs
