= Kentview, Johannesburg =

Kentview
- Location within Gauteng Location within South Africa
- Coordinates: 26.127°S 28.063°E
- Country: South Africa
- Province: Gauteng
- Municipality: City of Johannesburg
- Main Place: Johannesburg
- Established: 1958

Area
  - Total: 0.05 km^{2} (0.019 sq mi)

Population (2011)
  - Total: 356
  - Density: 7,100/km^{2} (18,000/sq mi)

Racial makeup (2011)
  - Black African: 22.3%
  - Coloured: 0.8%
  - Indian/Asian: 5.1%
  - White: 68.5%
  - Other: 3.4%

First languages (2011)
  - English: 73.0%
  - Afrikaans: 7.3%
  - Tswana: 5.3%
  - Zulu: 3.7%
  - Other: 10.7%
- Time zone: UTC+2 (SAST)
- Postal code (street): 2196

Kentview is a suburb of Johannesburg, South Africa. It is located in Region E of the City of Johannesburg Metropolitan Municipality.

== History ==
Prior to the discovery of gold on the Witwatersrand in 1886, the suburb lay on land on one of the original farms called Syferfontein. It became a suburb on 21 May 1958, and is named after Victor Kent, a chairman of Wanderers Club, and the man who purchased the land when the club moved from the moved from its location in the Johannesburg CBD at Old Wanderers to its current location what was then called Kent Park.
