= Tommy Ward (cricketer) =

South African cricketer (1887–1936)

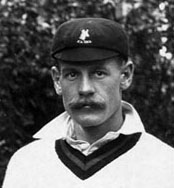

Personal information
- Full name: Thomas Alfred Ward
- Born: 2 August 1887; Rawalpindi, Punjab, British India
- Died: 16 February 1936 (aged 48); East Springs, Transvaal, South Africa
- Batting: Right-handed
- Role: Wicketkeeper

International information
- National side: South Africa
- Test debut: 27 May 1912 v Australia
- Last Test: 16 August 1924 v England

Domestic team information
- Years: Team
- 1909/10–1925/26: Transvaal

Career statistics
Competition	Test	First-class
Matches	23	92
Runs scored	459	1,635
Batting average	13.90	15.42
100s/50s	0/2	0/6
Top score	64	75
Catches/stumpings	19/13	107/68
- Source: Cricinfo, 27 December 2019

Thomas Alfred Ward (2 August 1887 – 16 February 1936) was a South African cricketer who played in 23 Test matches between 1912 and 1924.

A wicket-keeper and useful batsman, Ward played first-class cricket for Transvaal from 1909–10 to 1925–26. He toured England with the South African teams of 1912 and 1924.

Ward made his Test debut on 27 May 1912, the opening Test of the 1912 Triangular Tournament, between South Africa and Australia at Old Trafford. Ward, batting at number eleven, found himself facing the hat-trick ball of the Australian leg-spin bowler Jimmy Matthews. Matthews had just got the wickets of Rolland Beaumont (31) and Sid Pegler (LBW for 0). Facing his first ball in Test cricket, Ward was hit on the pads and was given out LBW, earning himself a golden duck on debut and giving Matthews his hat-trick. South Africa fell well short of the Australians' first innings total and were forced to follow on. In South Africa's second innings, Matthews again got two wickets in two balls, Herbie Taylor (21) and Reginald Schwarz, caught and bowled for 0. Ward for the second time in his debut match found himself walking to the crease to face Matthews on a hat-trick. Matthews got Ward out caught and bowled giving Ward his second golden duck for the match (a king pair) and Matthews his second hat-trick. This is the only time in Test cricket history when two hat-tricks have been taken in the one match.

Ward's highest score in Test cricket was 64, when he opened the batting against England in the Fourth Test in 1922–23. He also opened the batting when he made his highest first-class score of 75 for Transvaal against Natal in the 1923–24 Currie Cup.

Ward died in 1936 as a result of accidental electrocution while working at a gold mine in Transvaal.
