= Plum Lewis =

South African cricketer (1884–1976)

Personal information
- Full name: Percy Tyson Lewis
- Born: 2 October 1884; Cape Town, Cape Colony
- Died: 30 January 1976 (aged 91); Durban, Natal, South Africa
- Batting: Right-handed

International information
- National side: South Africa
- Only Test: 13 December 1913 v England

Career statistics
| Competition | Test | First-class |
|---|---|---|
| Matches | 1 | 12 |
| Runs scored | 0 | 507 |
| Batting average | 0.00 | 26.68 |
| 100s/50s | 0/0 | 1/3 |
| Top score | 0 | 151 |
| Catches/stumpings | 0/– | 7/– |
- Source: Cricinfo, 14 November 2022

Percy Tyson "Plum" Lewis (2 October 1884 – 30 January 1976) was a South African cricketer who played in one Test match in 1913.

After studying at Oxford University, Lewis played a few first-class matches, mostly for Western Province beginning in 1907–08. He made 151 in 185 minutes for Western Province against the MCC in the first match of the MCC's tour in 1913–14. He was unsuccessful in the match for Cape Province against the MCC two weeks later, but was still selected for the First Test. He was "c Woolley b Barnes 0" in each innings and South Africa lost by an innings and 157 runs, and Lewis was not selected for any further Tests.

Lewis served in France in the First World War as a lieutenant and was awarded the MC and Bar before being severely wounded in the leg. He also served as a lieutenant colonel in the Second World War, although not in combat, for which he was awarded an OBE. He worked as a lawyer.

| Preceded by Wilfred Rhodes | Oldest Living Test Cricketer; 8 July 1973 – 30 January 1976 | Succeeded by Tiger Smith |
