= Bill Lundie =

South African cricketer (1888–1917)

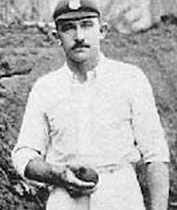

Personal information
- Full name: Eric Balfour Lundie
- Born: 15 March 1888; Willowvale, Cape Colony
- Died: 12 September 1917 (aged 29); Passchendaele salient, West Flanders, Belgium
- Batting: Right-handed
- Bowling: Right-arm fast

International information
- National side: South Africa
- Only Test: 27 February 1914 v England

Domestic team information
- Years: Team
- 1908–09 to 1909–10: Eastern Province
- 1909–10 to 1910–11: Western Province
- 1913–14: Transvaal

Career statistics
Competition	Tests	First-class
Matches	1	9
Runs scored	1	126
Batting average	1.00	8.40
100s/50s	0/0	0/0
Top score	1	29
Balls bowled	286	1510
Wickets	4	26
Bowling average	26.75	25.34
5 wickets in innings	0	1
10 wickets in match	0	0
Best bowling	4/101	6/52
Catches/stumpings	0/–	7/–
- Source: Cricinfo, 20 November 2017

Eric Balfour "Bill" Lundie (15 March 1888 – 12 September 1917) was a South African cricketer who played in one Test in 1914.

A fast bowler, Bill Lundie played eight first-class matches for three provinces between 1909 and 1914. His best figures were 6 for 52 in Eastern Province's loss to Border in 1908–09. His only Test, and last first-class match, was the Fifth Test in England's tour of South Africa in 1913–14. Opening the bowling, and bowling into the wind, he took 4 for 101 off 46.3 overs as England made 411. It was the last Test match before World War I.

In the war, Lundie served with the South African Service Corps before being commissioned as a second lieutenant in the 3rd Battalion of the Coldstream Guards. He was killed by shellfire during the Battle of Passchendaele on 12 September 1917.
