= Tiger Smith =

English cricketer

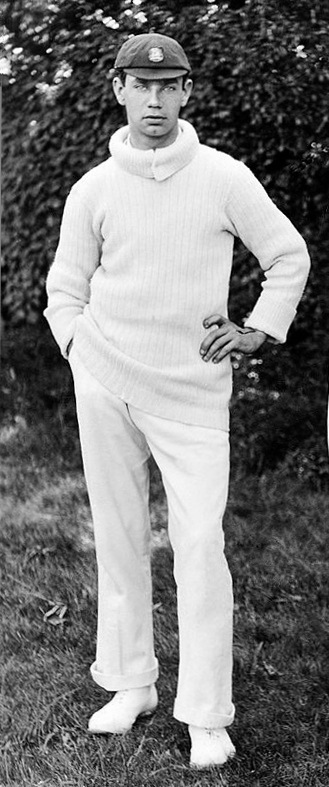
- Smith in 1905

Personal information
- Born: 6 February 1886; Birmingham, Warwickshire, England
- Died: 31 August 1979 (aged 93); Northfield, Birmingham, England
- Batting: Right-handed

International information
- National side: England
- Test debut: 30 December 1911 v Australia
- Last Test: 30 December 1913 v South Africa

Career statistics
Competition	Test	First-class
Matches	11	496
Runs scored	113	16,997
Batting average	8.69	22.39
100s/50s	0/0	20/63
Top score	22	177
Balls bowled	–	167
Wickets	–	2
Bowling average	–	51.00
5 wickets in innings	–	0
10 wickets in match	–	0
Best bowling	–	1/0
Catches/stumpings	17/3	722/156
- Source: CricInfo, 6 November 2022

Ernest James "Tiger" Smith (6 February 1886 – 31 August 1979) was an English wicket-keeper who played in 11 Tests from 1911/1912 to 1914. In county cricket, he had a much longer career as the successor to Dick Lilley: he played for Warwickshire on a regular basis until 1930. After that, Tiger Smith took to umpiring and became so good in this new role that he umpired several Test matches between 1933 and 1938.

Originally an employee with the Cadbury confectionery firm in Birmingham, he was first engaged by Warwickshire as a professional in 1904 but played only irregularly for over half a decade owing to the presence of Lilley behind the stumps. When, after losing his Test place Lilley decided to concentrate on batting, Tiger Smith took his opportunity remarkably well, and developed a remarkable understanding with Frank Foster in his first full season in 1910. The following year Warwickshire achieved an astonishing triumph in the County Championship even though the abnormally dry and hot weather made it an utter fluke based around the pace bowling of Foster and Frank Field. Smith kept wicket superbly – standing up to Foster even though he could get great pace off the extremely fast pitches – and made a remarkable advance in batting. He had not scored one half century before 1911 but advanced to over 800 runs with a century against Surrey at Edgbaston.

His choice for the 1911/1912 Ashes tour was surprising but Smith's skill at taking Foster was sufficient to keep Bert Strudwick out of the Test line-up. He made eight catches and one remarkable stumping off Foster and took the rising, spinning bowling of Sydney Barnes better than any other 'keeper before or since. 1912 saw the ill-fated Triangular Tournament, but the summer was so wet that English cricket in 1911 and 1912 was quite literally two different ball games. Warwickshire unsurprisingly declined to mid-table, but Smith maintained his form so well in 1913 with a personal high 68 dismissals that he was chosen for the South African tour. However, he lost his place to Strudwick after one Test and never regained his England place as Strudwick and Arthur Dolphin overtook him.

However, in the postwar years Smith was a mainstay of Warwickshire cricket right up to his retirement at the end of 1930. During this period, he not only kept wicket consistently, but also advanced so much as a batsman that he scored 1,303 runs in 1922 and 1,477 at over 31 an innings in 1925. In that season, he played a brilliant unbeaten innings of 139 out of 392 for one against Sussex and was unlucky that Jack Hobbs' presentation may have denied him a chance for Cricketer of the Year nomination by Wisden.

After retiring as a player, Tiger Smith umpired first-class cricket from May 1931 up to the outbreak of World War II. He stood as an umpire in eight Test matches in England, starting with 2nd Test between England and West Indies at Old Trafford in July 1933, then the 2nd Test between England and South Africa at Lord's in June 1935, the 2nd and 3rd Tests between England and New Zealand in 1937, the 2nd Test and 4th Tests between England and Australia Headingley in 1938, and finally the 1st and 2nd Test between England and West Indies in 1939.

He became coach of Warwickshire after the war, a position which he held until the end of 1955 and which saw the county win its second County Championship in 1951. He also umpired a few further first-class matches until 1953, mostly involving Warwickshire against non-county sides, such as Cambridge University or Combined Services. However, he continued to supervise the local indoor cricket school right up until the early 1970s when he handed the reins over to younger personnel. He was always renowned for his fighting qualities both on and off the cricket field and for his razor-sharp sense of humour which made him popular throughout his association with the game of cricket.

At the time of his death, Tiger Smith was the oldest living Test cricketer and was the last surviving pre-First World War player.

Preceded by Plum Lewis	Oldest Living Test Cricketer; 30 January 1976 – 31 August 1979	Succeeded by Andrew Sandham
