= Fred le Roux =

South African cricketer (1882–1963)

Personal information
- Full name: Frederick Louis le Roux
- Born: 5 February 1882; Somerset East, Cape Colony
- Died: 22 September 1963 (aged 81); Durban, Natal, South Africa
- Batting: Right-handed
- Bowling: Right-arm medium

International information
- National side: South Africa
- Only Test: 14 February 1914 v England

Career statistics
Competition	Test	First-class
Matches	1	34
Runs scored	1	1,258
Batting average	0.50	28.59
100s/50s	0/0	2/9
Top score	1	102
Balls bowled	54	3572
Wickets	0	93
Bowling average	–	19.75
5 wickets in innings	0	6
10 wickets in match	0	0
Best bowling	–	6/28
Catches/stumpings	0/–	15/–
- Source: CricInfo, 20 January 2019

Frederick Louis le Roux (5 February 1882 – 22 September 1963) was a South African cricketer.

Le Roux was born in Somerset East, Cape Colony. He was in a pool of players for consideration for the 1912 Triangular Tournament in England, but was not selected by the committee to travel. He played in his only Test match in February 1914, during England's tour to South Africa. He scored just one run in his two innings and bowled nine overs without taking a wicket. He also captained Transvaal in domestic cricket for several seasons. He died, aged 81, in Durban, Natal.
