= Claude Newberry =

South African cricketer (1888–1916)

Personal information
- Born: 30 November 1888; Port Elizabeth, Cape Colony
- Died: 1 August 1916 (aged 27); Delville Wood, Somme, France
- Batting: Right-handed
- Bowling: Right-arm fast; Right-arm leg-break

International information
- National side: South Africa
- Test debut: 26 December 1913 v England
- Last Test: 27 February 1914 v England

Domestic team information
- Years: Team
- 1910/11–1913/14: Transvaal

Career statistics
| Competition | Test | First-class |
|---|---|---|
| Matches | 4 | 16 |
| Runs scored | 62 | 251 |
| Batting average | 7.75 | 11.95 |
| 100s/50s | 0/0 | 0/0 |
| Top score | 16 | 42 |
| Balls bowled | 558 | 2,123 |
| Wickets | 11 | 49 |
| Bowling average | 24.36 | 24.75 |
| 5 wickets in innings | 0 | 1 |
| 10 wickets in match | 0 | 0 |
| Best bowling | 4/72 | 6/28 |
| Catches/stumpings | 3/– | 21/– |
- Source: Cricinfo, 21 November 2017

Claude Newberry (30 November 1888 – 1 August 1916) was a South African cricketer who played in four Test matches in the 1913–14 season.

Little is known of Claude Newberry's life. His exact date of birth is in doubt, and he appears to have been raised by an aunt, Esther Roberts, after his parents abandoned him when he was a baby.

A pace bowler who batted in the lower order, Newberry played several matches for Transvaal in 1910–11 and 1911–12, taking 6 for 28 in March 1911 to dismiss Eastern Province for 77. When England toured South Africa in 1913–14, the First Test resulted in an innings victory to England. In the next match of the tour, against Transvaal, Newberry was the most successful of the local bowlers, taking 3 for 109 as MCC again won by an innings. Newberry was brought into the South African side for the Second Test, one of four changes, and retained his place for the rest of the series, taking 11 wickets at an average of 24.36, making him South Africa's second-most successful bowler in the series. He dismissed Frank Woolley four times.

In World War I Newberry enlisted in the South African Infantry and served in France. He fought in the Battle of the Somme at Delville Wood, where he was killed in action on 1 August 1916.
