= Jimmy Matthews =

Australian sportsman (1884–1943)

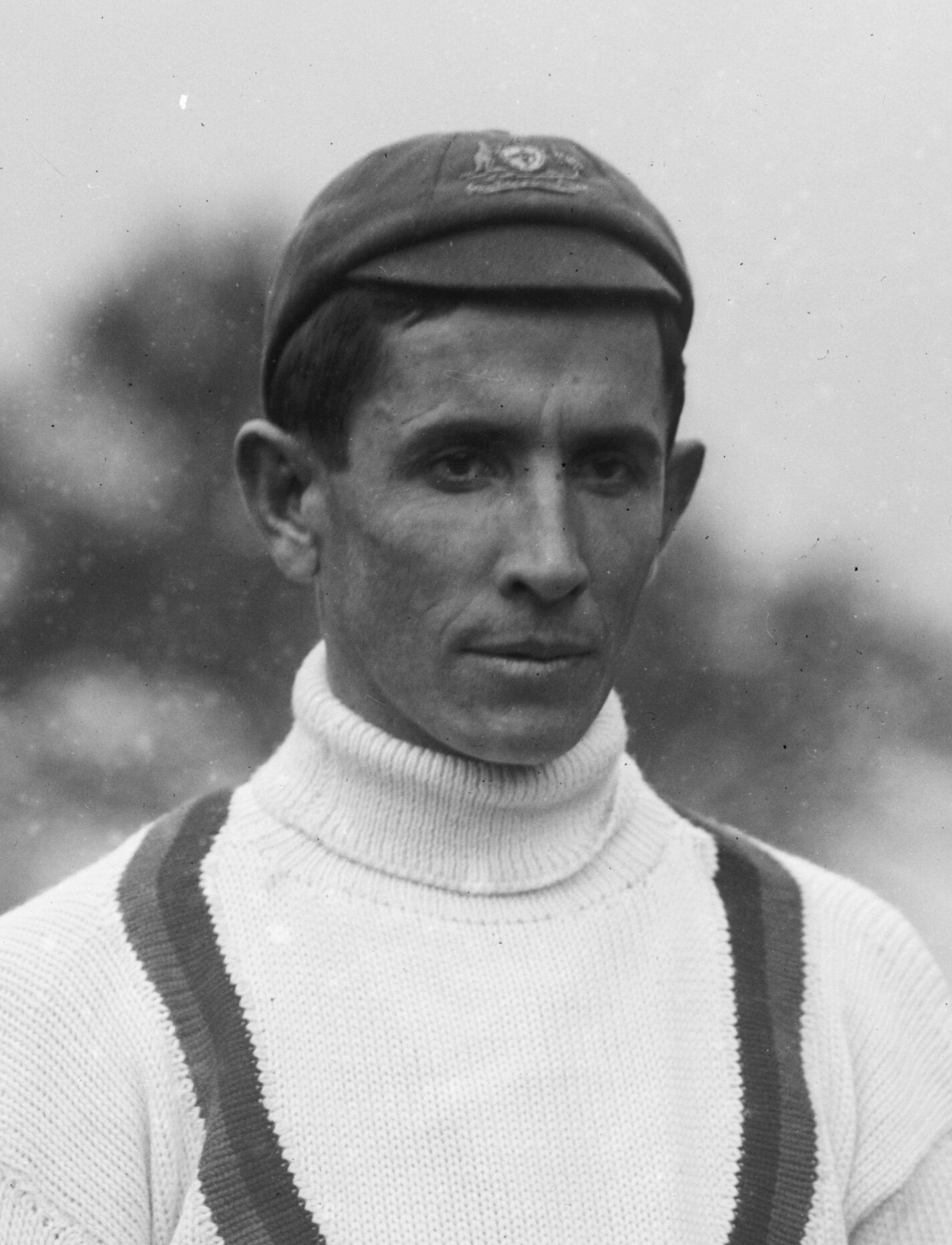
- Matthews in 1910

Personal information
- Full name: Thomas James Matthews
- Born: 3 April 1884; Mount Gambier, South Australia
- Died: 14 October 1943 (aged 59); Caulfield, Victoria, Australia
- Batting: Right-handed
- Bowling: Right-arm leg break

International information
- National side: Australia
- Test debut (cap 99): 12 January 1912 v England
- Last Test: 19 August 1912 v England

Career statistics
Competition	Test	First-class
Matches	8	67
Runs scored	153	2,149
Batting average	17.00	24.98
100s/50s	0/1	0/14
Top score	53	93
Balls bowled	1,081	7,582
Wickets	16	177
Bowling average	26.18	25.46
5 wickets in innings	0	8
10 wickets in match	0	1
Best bowling	4/29	7/46
Catches/stumpings	7/0	56/0
- Source: CricInfo, 24 August 2019

Thomas James Matthews (3 April 1884 – 14 October 1943) was an Australian Test cricketer. Bowling leg breaks, he is the only player to have taken two hat-tricks in the same Test match.

== International cricket career ==
"Possibly the best all-round cricketer Williamstown has produced", Matthews played in eight Test matches for the Australian cricket team, two in Australia in the 1911/12 season, and six in the 1912 Triangular Tournament in England. He played first-class cricket for Victoria in the seasons from 1906/07 to 1914/15, playing in 67 first-class matches in all, although 28 were played for Australia on the 1912 tour of England.

He is famed for being the only player to have ever taken two hat-tricks in the same Test match. In the opening Test of the 1912 Triangular Tournament, playing against South Africa at Old Trafford, he took a hat-trick in each innings. He took the last three wickets in South Africa's first innings, to prevent them avoiding the follow on; later the same day, 28 May 1912, he took a second hat-trick in the second innings. None of the dismissals required the assistance of any fielders: the first batsman was bowled, then two were leg before wicket, then another bowled, and finally two more caught and bowled. South African wicket-keeper Tommy Ward was his third victim in both hat-tricks, being the only known instance of a king pair on debut in Test cricket.

Matthews took no other wickets in the match, giving him match figures of 6 wickets for 54 runs, but he did take a further 9 wickets in the series, including 4/29 in the fifth match of the series, again against South Africa.

== Football ==
Prior to becoming an international cricketer, Matthews played Australian Rules football for Williamstown in the Victorian Football Association in 1903, 1905–1906, 1908–1910 and 1912–13. He also played 12 games for St Kilda in the Victorian Football League in 1907, kicking 18 goals. He was primarily a full-forward, and his 46 goals for Williamstown in the 1906 season was the second-highest of any player in the VFA that year; He also led the Club goalscoring with 30 goals in 1910. He played a total of 81 games for Williamstown and kicked 134 goals.

== Military service ==
He enlisted in the First AIF in July 1915, and was discharged on medical grounds in November 1917.

== Post-war ==
Matthews worked as a groundsman at Williamstown Cricket Ground. He died at the Caulfield Military Hospital on 14 October 1943.

== See also ==
- Test cricket hat-tricks

== Sources ==
- A Testimonial is Being Organised for Cricketer Jimmy Matthews, The Sporting Globe, (Saturday, 3 February 1923), p. 4.
- Chaffey, E., "An Appeal for Distressed Cricketer (Letter to the Editor)", The Age, (Tuesday, 6 February 1923), p. 10.
- Matthews Helped: Good Response to Appeal, The Sporting Globe, (Wednesday, 14 February 1923), p. 8.
- Atkinson, G. (1982) Everything you ever wanted to know about Australian rules football but couldn't be bothered asking, The Five Mile Press: Melbourne. ISBN 0 86788 009 0.
- Fiddian, M. (2016) The VFA: A History of the Victorian Football Association 1877 – 1995, Melbourne Sports Books: Melbourne. ISBN
- National Archives of Australia: World War I Service Record: Thomas James Matthews (3837)
- The Australian War Memorial Collection: World War I Embarkation Roll: Matthews, Thomas James (3837)
- The Australian War Memorial Collection: World War I Nominal Roll: Matthews, Thomas James (3837)
