= Frank Grey (umpire) =

South African cricket umpire (1878–1954)

Personal information
- Full name: Frank Willoughby Grey
- Born: 1878
- Died: 1954 (aged 75–76)

Umpiring information
- Tests umpired: 10 (1910–1922)
- Source: Cricinfo, 7 June 2019

Frank Grey (1878–1954) was a South African cricket umpire. He stood in ten Test matches between 1910 and 1922.

== See also ==
- List of Test cricket umpires
