= Dan Taylor (cricketer) =

South African cricketer (1887–1957)

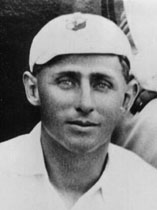

Personal information
- Born: 9 January 1887; Durban, Natal
- Died: 24 January 1957 (aged 70); Durban, Natal, South Africa
- Batting: Left-handed
- Bowling: Right-arm medium

International information
- National side: South Africa
- Test debut: 14 February 1914 v England
- Last Test: 27 February 1914 v England

Domestic team information
- Years: Team
- 1907/08–1919/20: Natal

Career statistics
Competition	Test	First-class
Matches	2	11
Runs scored	85	394
Batting average	21.25	21.88
100s/50s	0/0	0/1
Top score	36	65
Balls bowled	–	96
Wickets	–	2
Bowling average	–	33.50
5 wickets in innings	–	0
10 wickets in match	–	0
Best bowling	–	1/17
Catches/stumpings	0/–	4/–
- Source: Cricinfo, 27 December 2019

Daniel Taylor (9 January 1887 – 24 January 1957) was a South African cricketer who played in two Test matches in 1914.

A left-handed middle-order batsman, Dan Taylor was the older brother of the South African Test captain Herbie Taylor. He played in two Test matches under his brother's captaincy during England's 1913–14 tour of South Africa, scoring 36 in each innings of his first game, but failing in the other match.

Taylor had a spasmodic first-class cricket career, appearing in only 11 matches over a 12-year period, and playing regularly for Natal only in 1912–13 and just once the following season. He passed 50 runs in an innings only once in his career.
