= Gerald Hartigan =

South African cricketer

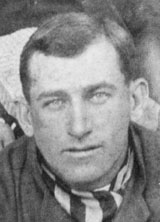

Personal information
- Full name: Gerald Patrick Desmond Hartigan
- Born: 30 December 1884; King William's Town, Cape Colony
- Died: 7 January 1955 (aged 70); Addington, Durban, Natal, South Africa
- Batting: Right-handed
- Bowling: Right-arm fast-medium

International information
- National side: South Africa
- Test debut: 27 May 1912 v Australia
- Last Test: 1 January 1914 v England

Domestic team information
- Years: Team
- 1903/04–1926/27: Border

Career statistics
Competition	Test	First-class
Matches	5	37
Runs scored	114	1,535
Batting average	11.40	29.51
100s/50s	0/1	3/8
Top score	51	176*
Balls bowled	252	3,924
Wickets	1	92
Bowling average	141.00	21.08
5 wickets in innings	0	4
10 wickets in match	0	0
Best bowling	1/72	7/44
Catches/stumpings	0/–	19/–
- Source: Cricinfo, 14 November 2022

Gerald Patrick Desmond Hartigan (30 December 1884 – 7 January 1955) was a South African cricketer who played in five Test matches from 1912 to 1914. He also represented South Africa at soccer.

== Life and career ==
Hartigan was born in King William's Town in the Cape Colony, and attended St Aidan's School there. A right-handed batsman and right-arm fast-medium bowler, he made his first-class career with Border, taking 92 wickets and scoring three centuries. His highest score of 176 came against Eastern Province in 1910–11.

Hartigan was one of the most successful batsmen in South African first-class cricket in 1910–11 and 1911–12, scoring 698 runs at an average of 63.45. He was selected to tour England for the 1912 Triangular Tournament. He scored 103 in the innings victory over Worcestershire early in the tour, but was otherwise unsuccessful, playing in only two of South Africa's six Tests before fracturing his arm during one match while throwing the ball in from the field. He played in the first three Tests when England toured South Africa in 1913–14, top-scoring with 51 in the first innings of the Second Test.

Hartigan also played six matches of soccer for South Africa. He toured Argentina with the South African team in 1906, and played at home against England in 1911.
