= Horace Chapman (cricketer) =

South African cricketer (1890–1941)

Cricket information
- Batting: Right-handed
- Bowling: Legbreak googly

International information
- National side: South Africa
- Test debut: 14 February 1914 v England
- Last Test: 5 November 1921 v Australia

Career statistics
Competition	Test	First-class
Matches	2	18
Runs scored	39	587
Batting average	13.00	20.96
100s/50s	0/0	0/3
Top score	17	71
Balls bowled	126	1,254
Wickets	1	30
Bowling average	104.00	25.23
5 wickets in innings	0	1
10 wickets in match	0	0
Best bowling	1/51	5/35
Catches/stumpings	1/–	15/–
- Source: Cricinfo, 14 November 2022

Horace William Chapman (30 June 1890 – 1 December 1941) was a South African cricketer who played in two Test matches from 1914 to 1921.
