= Herbie Taylor =

South African cricketer (1889-1973)

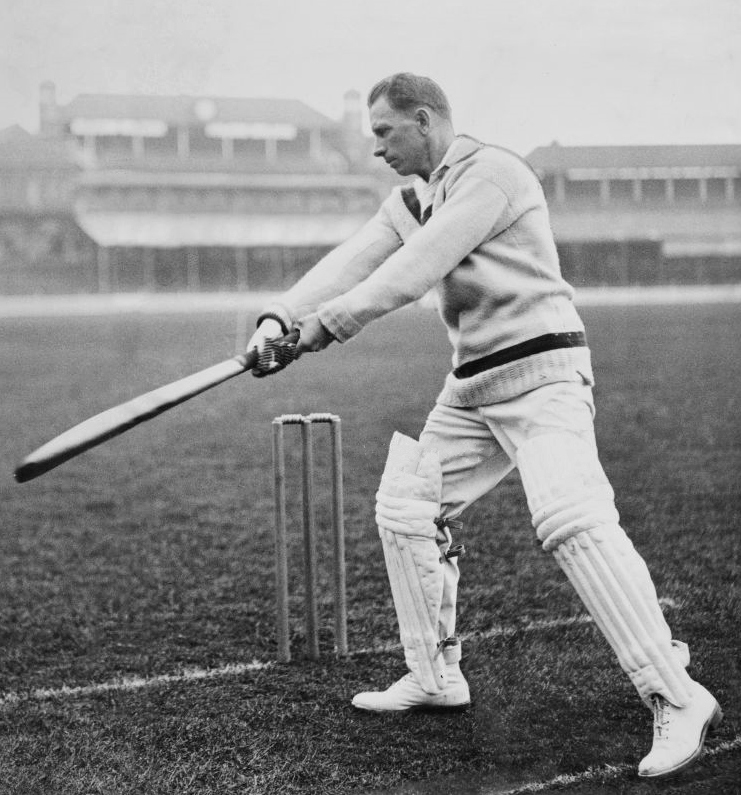
- Taylor at the Oval in 1924

Personal information
- Full name: Herbert Wilfred Taylor
- Born: 5 May 1889; Durban, Colony of Natal
- Died: 8 February 1973 (aged 83); Newlands, Cape Town, Cape Province, South Africa
- Batting: Right-handed
- Bowling: Right-arm unknown style
- Role: Batsman
- Relatives: Dan Taylor (brother)

International information
- National side: South Africa
- Test debut (cap 77): 27 May 1912 v Australia
- Last Test: 27 February 1932 v New Zealand

Domestic team information
- Years: Team
- 1909/10–1924/25: Natal
- 1925/26–1930/31: Transvaal
- 1932: MCC
- 1932/33–1934/35: Natal
- 1935/36: Western Province

Career statistics
Competition	Test	First-class
Matches	42	206
Runs scored	2,936	13,105
Batting average	40.77	41.86
100s/50s	7/17	30/64
Top score	176	250*
Balls bowled	342	1,185
Wickets	5	22
Bowling average	31.20	25.45
5 wickets in innings	0	0
10 wickets in match	0	0
Best bowling	3/15	4/36
Catches/stumpings	19/–	75/–
- Source: CricketArchive, 30 April 2009

Herbert Wilfred Taylor MC (5 May 1889 – 8 February 1973) was a South African cricketer who played 42 Test matches for his country including 18 as captain of the side. Specifically a batsman, he was an expert on the matting pitches which were prevalent in South Africa at the time and scored six of his seven centuries at home. His batting was also noted for quick footwork and exceptional 'backplay'. He became the first South African to pass 2,500 Test runs and was selected one of Wisden's Cricketers of the Year in 1925. In domestic cricket, he played for Natal, Transvaal and Western Province.

Taylor's greatest achievement is generally reckoned to be scoring 508 runs at an average of 50.80 in the 1913–14 Test series against England, in spite of English bowler Sydney Barnes taking a record 49 wickets in the series at 10.93. The cricket historian H.S. Altham wrote: "The English cricketers were unanimous that finer batting than his against Barnes at his best they never hoped to see." Neville Cardus noted it was "perhaps the most skilful of all Test performances by a batsman." It also led Cardus to count Taylor as "one of the six greatest batsmen of the post-Grace period".

== Cricket career ==
=== Early career ===
Born in Durban, Taylor attended Michaelhouse School from 1903 to 1907, during which period he was coached by Sussex bowler George Cox. Taylor made his first-class debut for Natal in January 1910 against the touring MCC team, he opened the batting in both innings, scoring 55 and 30. After finishing the 1910/11 season as second highest run scorer in the Currie Cup, he was selected for South Africa's touring party to England in 1912.

=== Triangular tournament ===
In the final warm-up match before the Triangular Tournament began, Taylor scored 83 in an innings victory over Worcestershire. He shared in a 146-run opening partnership with Gerald Hartigan after the home side had been dismissed for 50. In the first match of the tournament between South Africa and Australia at Old Trafford, Taylor was selected to make his Test debut. Opening South Africa's innings, in response to Australia's total of 448, Taylor was dismissed for a duck. South Africa followed on and were dismissed for 98 to lose by an innings, Taylor top-scored in the second innings with 21, having moved down the order. In the next two Tests against England he struggled for runs scoring 39 in four innings. In South Africa's second Test against Australia at Lord's he made his maiden half-century, batting at number six he top scored with 93 in a first innings total of 263. From 74/5 he put on a 97-run stand with Louis Stricker "in little more than an hour". Wisden noting that Taylor's "driving was splendid". In South Africa's two remaining fixtures he scored 31 runs, to finish with a series aggregate of 194 at an average of 19.40. South Africa had a poor series, losing five of their six Tests, drawing the other which was rain affected. Taylor finished the whole tour with 1340 runs, a figure only bettered by Dave Nourse.

The Wisden end of series report stated: "Excellent in style and a powerful driver, he is likely to make a great mark before he is much older". In 1912/13 Taylor captained Natal as they won the Currie Cup. He started his captaincy career with a match against Transvaal, in the second innings of which he scored an unbeaten 250 in 225 minutes, out of a score of 384/5 declared. Only one other player passed fifty in the match. This score remained the highest of his first-class career.

=== England 1913/14 ===
England (Marylebone Cricket Club) toured South Africa in 1913/14, the tourists final game before the Tests began was against Natal at Pietermaritzburg. Taylor carried his bat in the first innings, scoring 83 in a total of 124, in the second he scored 42 not out as the match was drawn. He carried this form into the first Test at Durban, his first match as captain of South Africa. Having won the toss and chosen to bat first he made a maiden Test century, scoring 109 in about three hours and 20 minutes. Wisden described the innings as a "superb display of batting" commenting that he played "[Sydney] Barnes with perfect confidence". However Taylor got little support from his teammates and South Africa were dismissed for 182. England won the Test by an innings after the hosts had managed just 111 in the second innings, Taylor scored eight. England also won the second Test at Johannesburg by an innings, Sydney Barnes taking record Test match figures of 17/159, Taylor fell to him twice for scores of 29 and 40.

Taylor took his Test best bowling figures in the third Test which was again staged in Johannesburg, in England's first innings he took three wickets for 15 runs (3/15) from 10 overs. In dismissing Wilfred Rhodes leg before wicket he claimed his maiden Test wicket, his other two wickets were that of Frank Woolley and Morice Bird. Taylor opened the bowling in the second innings and, although expensive, claimed the wicket of Rhodes again. In terms of batting Taylor scored 14 and 70, the latter innings came in a 153-run opening stand with Billy Zulch. There was a six-week gap between the third and fourth Tests, in which period the MCC played seven tour matches. The last of these was against Natal, and just like in the earlier tour fixture Taylor dominated the scoring for the hosts. In a low scoring match he scored 91 (out of a team total of 153) and 100 (out of 216/6), as Natal won by 4 wickets. Only one other batsman in the match passed fifty.

In the fourth Test at Durban South Africa avoided defeat despite Sydney Barnes excellent form continuing, he claimed 14 more wickets to take his series tally to 49. Taylor was dismissed by him in both innings, scoring 16 in the first and 93 in the second, an innings Wisden described as "more cautious than usual". In that second innings he shared a 69-run partnership with his older brother Dan who was making his Test debut. In the fifth and final Test of the series at Port Elizabeth Taylor scored 42 and 87 as South Africa lost by ten wickets. In the second innings he shared a century stand with Billy Zulch for the second time in the series, this time they put on 129. Despite the 4–0 defeat Taylor finished the series as the leading run scorer on either side with 508 runs in 10 innings, his aggregate was 227 ahead of the next best South African, Philip Hands. This performance came while facing Barnes who finished the series with a Test record 49 wickets at 10.93. The cricket historian H. S. Altham wrote: "The English cricketers were unanimous that finer batting than his against Barnes at his best they never hoped to see". Neville Cardus wrote in the 1955 Wisden:

Yet at his deadliest Barnes met a worthy opponent in H. W. Taylor, who played with ease and assurance in each Test match...how possibly could any mortal batsman be subjected to a severer ordeal—Barnes on matting, with wickets falling at the other end all the time? H. W. Taylor must be counted one of the six greatest batsmen of the post-Grace period.

Cardus also wrote that Taylor's performance was "perhaps the most skilful of all Test performances by a batsman".

=== Post-war ===
Taylor returned to cricket in 1919/20 having won the Military Cross in World War I. He served 18 months in the Royal Field Artillery and two years in the Royal Flying Corps. His first match back for Natal was against Transvaal in April 1920, he scored 76 but the innings was overshadowed by Dave Nourse who scored 304 not out. This was the only match of the season however formal competition (the Currie Cup) returned for the 1920/21 season. Taylor scored 150 in the opening match of the season against Orange Free State and finished with 372 runs at an average of 53.14.

The first international opponents for South Africa following the War were Australia, who toured South Africa in 1921/22. Despite the eight-year gap after the hosts' last Test, Taylor was still captain. In the first Test at Durban, Taylor was dismissed for one in the first innings, and he moved down the order to number four for the second innings and the remainder of the series. From the unaccustomed position he made scores of 29, 47, 80, 26 and 17 to finish the series with a total of 200 runs at an average of 33.33. After the first two Tests were drawn, Australia won the three match series with a ten wicket victory at Cape Town.

=== England 1922/23 ===
The following season saw England tour and just like nine years previous Taylor was at his best. In the first Test at Johannesburg he batted at number three and in the second innings scored a superb 176, the next highest score in the match was 50. Taylor's knock included 25 boundaries and was the largest by a South African against England. South Africa won the Test by 168 runs, it was Taylor's first victory as captain and as a Test player. He followed that in the second Test with scores of 9 and 68 as England narrowly won by one wicket. In the third Test at Durban he was moved back up to open the innings, he scored 91 and shared 110 with Bob Catterall. The third days play was washed out leaving the draw inevitable in a four-day match. The fourth Test was also drawn, Taylor scored 11 at number four and when moved back as opener in the second innings made 101. Wisden wrote: "Taylor, who hit out freely when fear of defeat had gone, played a masterly game, but he had a little luck".

With the series still level at 1–1, the fifth and final Test was made Timeless to ensure a winner of the series. England's C. A. G. Russell scored two centuries in the match and South Africa were set a target of fourth innings target of 344. Taylor, at number four, batted for four and a half hours over an innings of 102 however he received little support from his teammates and South Africa lost by 109 runs. Taylor finished the series with 582 runs at 64.66 and was the highest scorer on either side, his total was 278 more than the next South African. His series total was at the time a Test record for a captain, later surpassed by Don Bradman in 1936. His three centuries in the series set a South African Test record which was only bettered in 2003/04 by Jacques Kallis. The Wisden report of the series recorded that "H. W. Taylor as a batsman was in a class by himself".

=== 1924 England tour ===
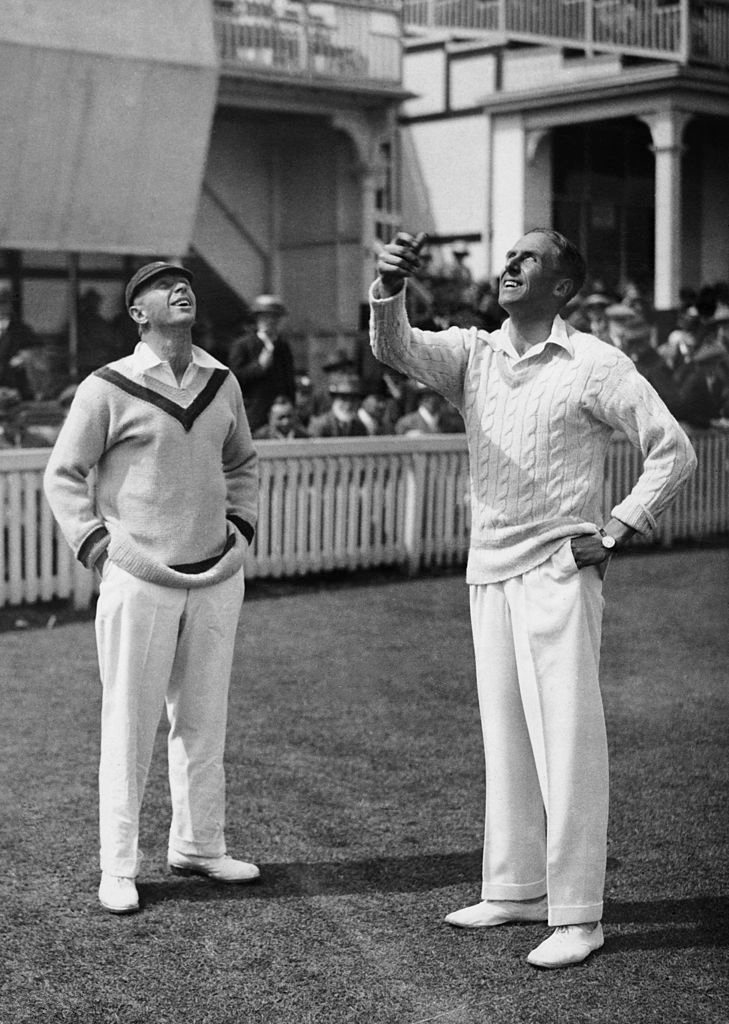
Taylor (left) watches the England captain Arthur Gilligan tossing the coin before the first Test match at Edgbaston in Birmingham on 14 June 1924.

Taylor played only two matches in the 1923/24 season prior to the South Africa tour of England in 1924. His form at the start of the tour was poor, in 11 matches before the first Test, he scored just two fifties in 18 innings. In the first Test at Edgbaston he scored 7 and 34, however his first innings was the top score for South Africa as they were dismissed for 30 in 12.3 overs. It equalled the record for the lowest Test total, the previous score of 30 also set by South Africa against England. It was also the only occasion in Test history that not a single batsman had reached double figures. Despite scoring 390 in the second innings they lost by an innings and 18 runs, the same margin of defeat followed in the second Test at Lord's where Taylor made scores of four and eight.

They were three tour matches between the second and third Tests, in the second of these against Northamptonshire Taylor top scored with 116, his second century of the tour. The third match saw South Africa return to Edgbaston, this time against Warwickshire he top scored in both innings with 94 and 116. His good form continued into the third Test where he made scores of 59 not out and 56. He shared 54 and 99 run partnerships with Bob Catterall as South Africa averted a third consecutive innings defeat however they still lost by nine wickets. Rain affected the final two Tests of the series and both were drawn, Taylor scored 18 not out at Old Trafford and 11 at The Oval. His series total was 197 at 32.83. Wisden described the performance as 'disappointing' but commented: "There can be no doubt that the anxiety of captaining a beaten team told upon him and that he would have done far better if he had had nothing to think about but his own batting." In the tour as a whole he played in 34 first-class matches and scored 1,898 runs, marginally fewer than Dave Nourse but with a higher average of 42.17.

=== England 1927/28 ===
Three South African seasons passed without an international tour, in this time Taylor moved from Natal to Transvaal prior to the 1925/26 season. He had a successful first season with his new side, captaining them to win the Currie Cup and scoring 344 runs at an average of 68.80. The following season he scored 481 runs at 80.16 as Transvaal retained the title.

England toured South Africa in 1927/28 for a five-Test series. Taylor was no longer captain, having been replaced by Nummy Deane, but he showed himself to still be the country's leading batsman by top scoring in the series. In the first Test at Johannesburg he scored 31 and 4 as the tourists won by ten wickets. With scores of 68 and 71 he top scored in both innings of the second Test at Cape Town, in the second innings he shared a 115-run opening partnership with Mick Commaille. He made another fifty in the third Test before scoring a first innings century in the fourth that played a crucial part in South Africa winning the match by four wickets and keeping the series alive. Wisden described Taylor's innings of 101: "By restrained methods he gradually obtained a mastery over the bowling and then hit so freely that he scored 101 out of 170 in two hours and twenty-five minutes". Taylor scored 36 and 29 in the fifth and final Test which South Africa won by eight wickets to square the series. It was the first time in his Test career that Taylor hadn't finished on the losing side in a series. He ended the series as South Africa's top scorer with 412 although Bob Catterall had a marginally higher average.

=== 1929 England tour ===
Taylor toured England for a third time in 1929, as part of a young and inexperienced squad he was one of only three players who had toured the country previously. After Taylor scored two in the drawn first Test, he missed both second and third Tests with an injury. This was the first time Taylor hadn't appeared in the Test team since his debut in 1912. He returned for the fourth Test at Old Trafford and played two attacking innings in defeat. In the first innings scoring 28 of the 32 added while at the crease, while in the second innings he was dismissed for 70 with the score at 113. Wisden considered his driving to be "admirable in its power and certainty". In the fifth and final Test at The Oval Taylor scored his first Test century outside of his homeland. He scored 121 including 12 boundaries, the innings came with South Africa 20/3 in their first innings, Taylor alongside captain Nummy Deane shared a fourth wicket stand of 214. Wisden recorded: "The batting of both men reached a very high standard and, coming as it did in such circumstances, was easily the best in point of class and skill shown by the South Africans in the whole series of Tests." The stand was a South African record for the fourth wicket until beaten in 2003 by Jacques Kallis and Gary Kirsten. The century gave Taylor a total of 221 runs in the series at an average of 55.25. The end of tour report in Wisden commentated that although he wasn't the dominating personality of previous years he was still the man England had most to fear. In the whole tour he scored 1,575 first-class runs at 38.41, the highest average amongst the tourists.

=== England 1930/31 ===
Taylor played only two Currie Cup matches in the 1929/30 season, but made centuries in both. In the final two matches of the season he scored 142 against Western Province and 139 against Rhodesia as Transvaal won the title for a third time in five seasons. The following season saw England tour for a five Test series which witnessed a first series victory for South Africa since 1910. Taylor missed the first Test which South Africa won by 28 runs. He returned for the second at Cape Town and scored a seventh Test century. He was one of three South African centurions but Taylor's 117 was considered by Wisden as "the most attractive batting display for South Africa." England followed on in the match but were able to draw the match. The third match was also drawn but on this occasion England had the better of the play, Taylor scored an unbeaten 64 from a total of 145/8 in the second innings to ensure the draw. In the fourth Test he top scored in the first innings with 72, the innings took South Africa past the follow on which was crucial in securing another draw. England needed to win the fifth Test to level the series but they were unable to dismiss South Africa quickly in the first innings having put them in and the hosts controlled the match from there. South Africa drew the match and therefore won the series 1–0, it was Taylor's first series victory as a Test player.

=== Australia 1931/32 ===
In 1931/32 South Africa toured Australia for the first time since 1910/11, it was therefore Taylor's first tour of the country. Without the chance of a draw, all Tests in Australia at the time were Timeless, South Africa were whitewashed in the Test series. Part of the reason for this dominance was Don Bradman who scored 806 runs including four centuries. Taylor scored 41 and 47 in the first match at Brisbane and made innings of seven and six in the second at Sydney, South Africa lost both Tests by wide margins. They gained a first innings lead of 160 in the third but still lost, this time by 169 runs, Taylor contributed 11 and 38. His highest innings of the series came in the fourth Test at Adelaide where he scored 78 and 84, in both innings he shared century stands with Bruce Mitchell however Clarrie Grimmett's 14 wickets saw Australia win by ten wickets. In the fifth Test, South Africa made totals of just 36 and 45 and lost by an innings. Taylor was dismissed for a duck in the first innings and made two in the second. The duck was the first since his debut Test, a run of 72 innings which was a then Test record. His series total of 314 runs made him South Africa's second highest scorer behind Mitchell. In the tour as a whole he was also second behind Mitchell, Taylor scored 813 runs with one century against New South Wales.

Following the Australia tour South Africa played two Tests in New Zealand, the first Tests to be staged between the two teams. In the single warm-up match before the first Test, Taylor scored 113 against Auckland. In the first Test at Christchurch he didn't fare as well, dismissed for nine having come to the crease following a large opening stand. This was his final innings in Test cricket as he announced his retirement from that form of the game prior to the second Test.

=== After Test retirement ===
Taylor continued to play first-class cricket for a short period. In 1932 he spent the season in England playing for a variety of teams including: the MCC, the Gentlemen, an England XI and the Rest of England side. He returned to South African domestic cricket for the 1932/33 season although he played only one match. Now at Natal he played against former team Transvaal and scored 158. Over the following two seasons he played eight further matches and adding two further centuries. The last of his 30 first-class centuries came in December 1934 at the age of 45. In March 1936 he made a brief comeback playing one first-class match for Western Province against the touring Australians.

Taylor took up coaching schoolboys upon retirement. He lived in Cape Town near the Newlands ground which was where he died in 1973.

== Records and statistics ==
=== Batting ===
At the time of his retirement Taylor held a number of South African Test batting records, including most runs (2,936), centuries (7) and half-centuries (17). His average of 40.77 was only fractionally behind that of Aubrey Faulkner (40.79). The aforementioned records were all surpassed by Bruce Mitchell in the late 1940s. Taylor had most of his success on the matting pitches of South Africa, he averaged 48.80 and scored six of his centuries at home. In comparison, his average outside of South Africa was 30.16 and 20 Tests produced a single century. He scored 2,001 of his Test runs at home and this aggregate remained a record until after readmission.

For the majority of Taylor's career there were only two other Test nations, Australia and England and he only played against different opposition, New Zealand, in his final Test. Of Taylor's 42 Tests, 30 were against England. He scored all of his centuries and accumulated 2,287 runs against that opposition. In England-South Africa contests only Mitchell has scored more runs while the seven centuries is a record he shares with Mitchell, Dudley Nourse, Denis Compton and Jacques Kallis.

In Currie Cup matches he scored 3,226 runs at an average of 58.65 and was part of seven championship winning teams, four with Natal and three with Transvaal.

=== Captaincy ===
Taylor captained his nation in four series and 18 Tests in total and although he had personal success in averaging 47.96 during this period, the team lost all four series and they won only one Test with him in charge. However this was indicative of South Africa at the time and during his whole career Taylor only enjoyed four Test victories, he played a large part in the first two of these scoring centuries in the Johannesburg wins of 1922 and 1928.

Despite the results under him Taylor does have a number of captaincy achievements to his name. He holds the record for longest time spent as Test captain, he took charge of his first Test on 13 December 1913 and his last on 16 August 1924, a period of 10 years and 251 days. Taylor is one of two South African captains to have scored centuries in their first match in charge, the other is Jackie McGlew. By scoring that century he also had a share in the first occasion of opposing captains scoring centuries in the same match.

=== Rankings ===
On subsequently calculated world rankings Taylor reached a peak batting rating of 844 (out of 1000), this placed him top of the batting rankings. He reached this mark in February 1923 following his innings of 102 in the fifth Test of the home series with England. He remained top of the rankings for only a single match but did disturb Jack Hobbs from the top spot, the only person to do so between 1912 and 1928.
