= Rolland Beaumont =

South African cricketer (1884–1958)

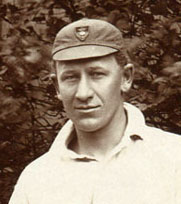

Cricket information
- Batting: Right-handed
- Bowling: Right-arm

International information
- National side: South Africa
- Test debut: 27 May 1912 v Australia
- Last Test: 1 January 1914 v England

Career statistics
Competition	Test	First-class
Matches	5	32
Runs scored	70	1,086
Batting average	7.77	25.25
100s/50s	0/0	1/5
Top score	31	121
Catches/stumpings	2/–	11/–
- Source: Cricinfo, 14 November 2022

Rolland Beaumont (4 February 1884 – 25 May 1958) was a South African cricketer. He was born at Newcastle, Natal, and died in Berea, Durban, aged 74. He attended Hilton College.

Beaumont was a hard hitting middle-order batsman and a good fielder. His first-class career spanned the years 1908 to 1914 and consisted of 32 matches, most of which were for South Africa during their tour of England in the wet summer of 1912. His first match of importance was for Wanderers when the Johannesburg club drew with a Rest of South Africa team containing S.J. Snooke and A.W. Nourse. He also turned out six times for Transvaal and represented South Africa at Test level in five matches against England and Australia. When playing his natural game Beaumont was a free-flowing batsman but too often he let an over-cautious nature restrict his talent. He scored his only first-class century, 121, whilst captaining Transvaal in a two-day match at Johannesburg against P.W. Sherwell’s XI in November 1913. But in all first-class matches he built only six scores of 50 or more. His highest Test score was 31, compiled against the Australians at Old Trafford during the Triangular Series of 1912. No obituary for Beaumont appeared in Wisden.

He managed an oil company in Trinidad in the 1920s and donated the Beaumont Cup, which was contested by North Trinidad and South Trinidad beginning in the 1925–26 cricket season.

== Sources ==
- World Cricketers - A Biographical Dictionary by Christopher Martin-Jenkins, published by Oxford University Press (1996)
- The Wisden Book of Test Cricket, Volume 1 (1877–1977) compiled and edited by Bill Frindall, published by Headline Book Publishing (1995)
- Who's Who of Cricketers by Philip Bailey, Philip Thorn & Peter Wynne-Thomas, published by Hamlyn (1993)
