= Old Wanderers =

Cricket ground in Johannesburg, South Africa

Coordinates: 26.197720°S 28.040659°E

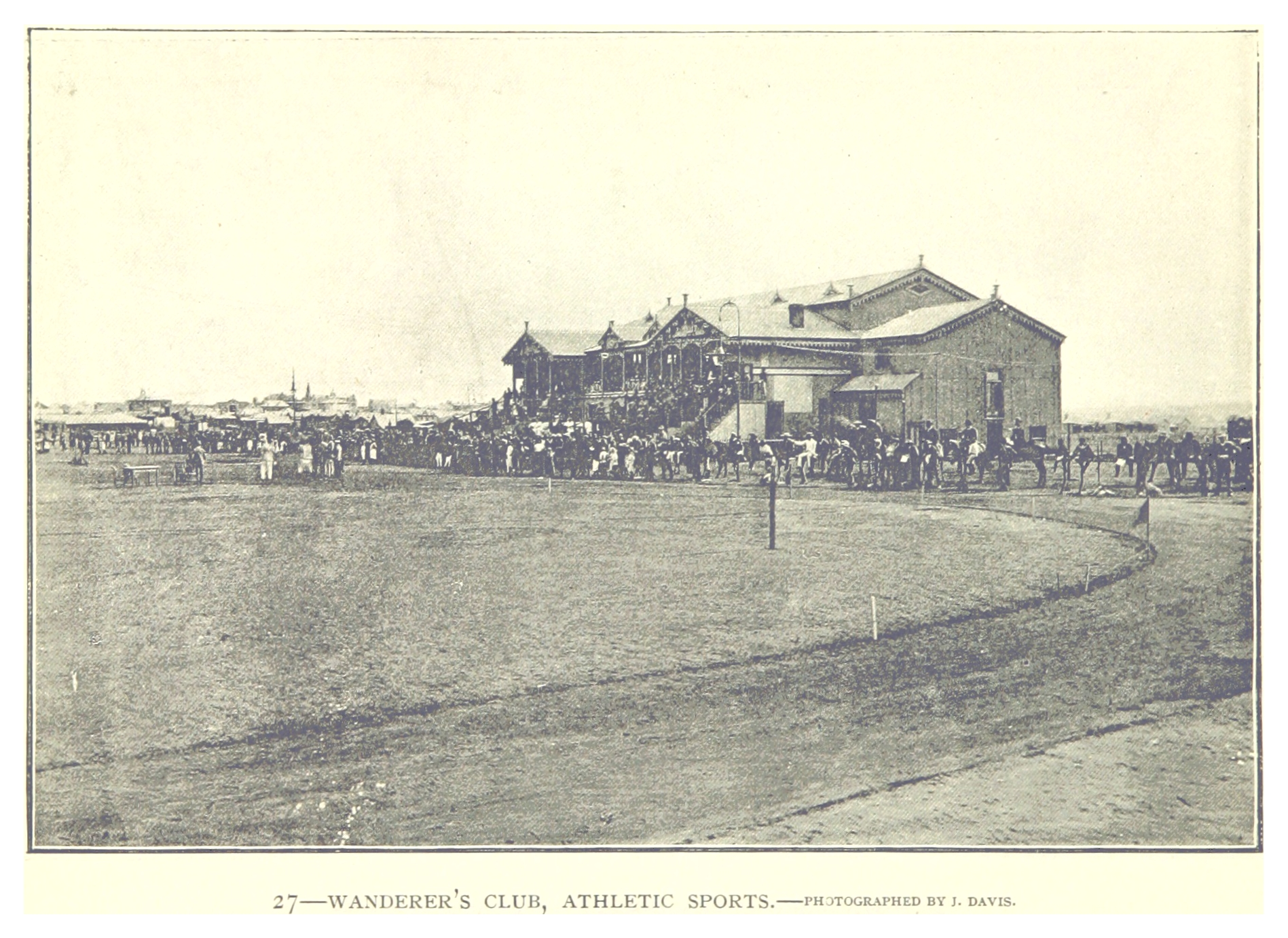
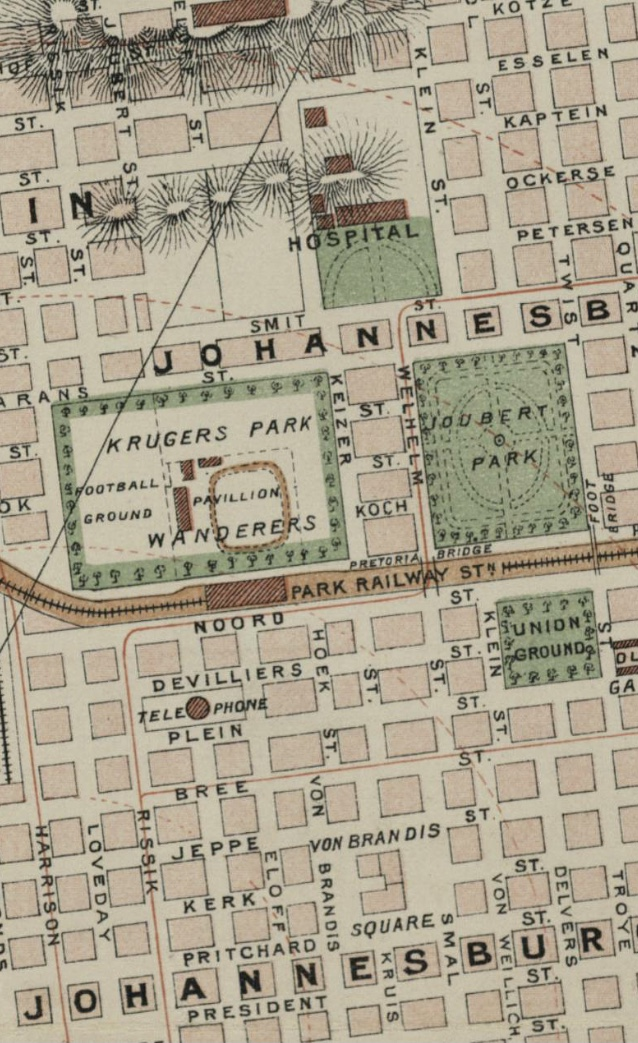
- Old Wanderers c.1893 Map indicating where Old Wanderers ground was located. c.1898
- Interactive map of Old Wanderers

Ground information
- Location: Johannesburg, Gauteng, South Africa
- Country: South Africa
- Establishment: 1888
- Capacity: n/a
- Tenants: South Africa cricket team Transvaal cricket team
- End names
- n/a

International information
- First men's Test: 2 March, 1896: South Africa v England
- Last men's Test: 18 February, 1939: South Africa v England
- As of 19 August, 2014; Source: Cricinfo

Old Wanderers was a cricket ground in Johannesburg, South Africa. The ground hosted 22 Test matches from 1895 to 1939, before being rebuilt as Johannesburg's Park Station in 1946. It has since been replaced by the New Wanderers Stadium.

== History ==
The wealthy elite of the town saw a need for a sports ground for the public in the new town of Johannesburg. Around 1888 a deputation consisting of Hermann Eckstein, J.B. Taylor, Jacob Swart, Llewellyn Andersson and others rode to Pretoria to meet with President Paul Kruger. He was shown a piece of land of 40 acres west of Joubert Park, but as the land was to be surveyed and sold as leasehold stands, he was concerned about the loss of income to the South African Republic. A compromise was reached and 31 acres was set aside for a sporting ground with a 99-year lease and 25 pounds a year. The ground was first called Kruger's Park but was later renamed Wanderers Club, with Hermann Eckstein and its first chairman and J.B. Taylor as its vice-chairman. When not used by the club, the grounds would be used as a public venue. It was the venue for the Witwatersrand's first horse show, gymkhana and dog show in May 1891 and with a cycle track around the cricket ground people saw future world cycle champion Laurens Meintjes race. And in November 1894, the Witwatersrand Agricultural Society would hold its first show at the Wanderers ground before moving it to Braamfontein where it would be later known as the Rand Show. The grounds would host its first cricket test match on 2 March 1896 when South Africa played England.

The South African sports journalist E. W. Ballantine described the playing surface as it was at the time of the Test match against the touring Australians in 1902:

The ground is a bare tract of land, dark red in colour, and in the centre of the Oval a green patch of cocoanut matting, 8ft. wide, is stretched and nailed down, each end about 6in. from the popping crease and outside it. The surface of the ground is hard, and consequently there is a tendency for the bowling to rise considerably. The fielding is generally true, notwithstanding that the presence of a few small pebbles would occasionally give the ball a little bit of hop. On a hot day the ground is naturally trying to the feet, while the dust, which is always more or less prevalent, has the effect of parching the players' throats ...

By the late 1920s, the station passenger numbers south of the Wanderers grounds had outgrown its facilities. The new station would need additional land which was only available to the north and which was part of the Old Wanderers ground. There was opposition to the idea by the people of Johannesburg when a 100 ft strip of the Wanderers ground was proposed with the South African Railways offering £31,000 and the club wanting the amount doubled. The land was lost to the railways with the final amount settled on was £35,000

In 1936, the club purchased 200 acres in Illovo and established a golf course called Kent Park, name after its chairman Victor Kent. This would later become the venue for the new Wanderers Stadium cricket ground.

By 1945, the Johannesburg Park Station had reached a capacity of 130,000 passengers a day and there was a need to expand the station's infrastructure with a new station, administrative buildings and a newer bridge over the railway lines and so the ideal land for the project was the Wanderers ground. Transport Minister F. C. Sturrock would attempt to sell the project to the public while it was countered by the Wanderers Club and Johannesburg Publicity Association, representing about fifty other bodies.

The South African government would expropriate the Wanderers ground and after a legal appeal by those who disagreed, on 30 March 1946, the Appellate Division of the Supreme Court upheld the governments decision. The Government would pay the Wanderers Club £500,000 in compensation and the Johannesburg Council £1,000,000 in the form of land at Plein Square, Kaserne and a small amount of land in Braamfontein and offset £300,000 owed by the council.

== Cricket history ==
The highest Test innings recorded at the ground was South Africa's 491 in their 2nd innings in the drawn 2nd Test against Australia in 1935/36,Full Scorecard of South Africa vs Australia 2nd Test 1935 - Score Report | ESPNcricinfo.com and the lowest was South Africa's 85 in their 2nd innings in the 2nd Test in 1902/03, on the way to losing to Australia by 159 runs (Jack Saunders taking 7/34). Full Scorecard of South Africa vs Australia 2nd Test 1902 - Score Report | ESPNcricinfo.com The ground saw 29 Test centuries, including double centuries for South African Dudley Nourse (231) in the drawn 2nd Test against Australia in 1934/35 Full Scorecard of South Africa vs Australia 2nd Test 1935 - Score Report | ESPNcricinfo.com and Australian captain and opening batsman Herbie Collins (203) in the drawn 2nd Test in 1921/22 (only his 10th Test match, and his 2nd as captain). Full Scorecard of South Africa vs Australia 2nd Test 1921 - Score Report | ESPNcricinfo.com

George Lohmann's 9/28 at Old Wanderers in the 2nd Test in 1896 was for six decades the best bowling figures in Test cricket, leading to a victory for England by an innings and 197 runs. Full Scorecard of South Africa vs England 2nd Test 1896 - Score Report | ESPNcricinfo.com The best bowling analysis for a Test match at the ground was Sydney Barnes's 17/159 for England in the 2nd Test in 1913/14 (8/56 and 9/103) in a victory by England by an innings and 12 runs.Full Scorecard of South Africa vs England 2nd Test 1913 - Score Report | ESPNcricinfo.com. The only other bowler to take 8 wickets in an innings at Old Wanderers was Tip Snooke in the 3rd Test against England (and only his third Test match) in 1905/06. Full Scorecard of South Africa vs England 3rd Test 1906 - Score Report | ESPNcricinfo.com

A railways-related test match record at Old Wanderers occurred when South African batsman Jimmy Sinclair hit the ball for six. It landed in a train standing at one of the platforms at the adjacent old Johannesburg station and was only discovered two days later in Cape Town. At approximately 956 miles, it must rate as the biggest six ever struck.

== International Centuries ==
From 1895 to 1939, twenty nine Test centuries have been scored.

| No. | Score | Player | Team | Balls | Opposing team | Date | Result |
|---|---|---|---|---|---|---|---|
| 1 | 122 | Tom Hayward | England | NA | South Africa | 2 March 1896 | Won |
| 2 | 132* | Pelham Warner | England | NA | South Africa | 14 February 1899 | Won |
| 3 | 142 | Clem Hill | Australia | NA | South Africa | 11 October 1902 | Drawn |
| 4 | 101 | Jimmy Sinclair | South Africa | NA | Australia | 18 October 1902 | Drawn |
| 5 | 159* | Warwick Armstrong | Australia | NA | South Africa | 18 October 1902 | Drawn |
| 6 | 102 | Maitland Hathorn | South Africa | NA | England | 10 March 1906 | Won |
| 7 | 143 | Frederick Fane | England | NA | South Africa | 10 March 1906 | Lost |
| 8 | 147 | Gordon White | South Africa | NA | England | 10 March 1906 | Won |
| 9 | 123 | Aubrey Faulkner | South Africa | NA | England | 1 January 1910 | Won |
| 10 | 104 | Lucky Denton | England | NA | South Africa | 26 February 1910 | Won |
| 11 | 152 | Wilfred Rhodes | England | NA | South Africa | 26 February 1913 | Won |
| 12 | 102 | Phil Mead | England | NA | South Africa | 26 February 1913 | Won |
| 13 | 203 | Herbie Collins | Australia | NA | South Africa | 12 November 1921 | Drawn |
| 14 | 119 | Jack Gregory | Australia | NA | South Africa | 12 November 1921 | Drawn |
| 15 | 152 | Charlie Frank | South Africa | NA | Australia | 12 November 1921 | Drawn |
| 16 | 111 | Dave Nourse | South Africa | NA | Australia | 12 November 1921 | Drawn |
| 17 | 176 | Herbie Taylor (1/3) | South Africa | NA | England | 23 December 1922 | Won |
| 18 | 115 | Frank Woolley | England | NA | South Africa | 9 February 1923 | Drawn |
| 19 | 101 | Herbie Taylor (2/3) | England | NA | South Africa | 9 February 1923 | Drawn |
| 20 | 102 | Herbert Sutcliffe | England | NA | South Africa | 24 December 1927 | Won |
| 21 | 122 | Ernest Tyldesley | England | NA | South Africa | 24 December 1927 | Won |
| 22 | 101 | Herbie Taylor (3/3) | South Africa | NA | England | 28 January 1928 | Won |
| 23 | 231 | Dudley Nourse | South Africa | NA | Australia | 24 December 1935 | Drawn |
| 24 | 189 | Stan McCabe | Australia | NA | South Africa | 24 December 1935 | Drawn |
| 25 | 108 | Jack Fingleton | Australia | NA | South Africa | 15 February 1936 | Won |
| 26 | 117 | Eddie Paynter (1/2) | England | NA | South Africa | 24 December 1938 | Drawn |
| 27 | 102 | Eric Dalton | South Africa | NA | England | 24 December 1938 | Drawn |
| 28 | 106 | Paul Gibb | England | NA | South Africa | 24 December 1938 | Drawn |
| 29 | 100 | Eddie Paynter (2/2) | England | NA | South Africa | 24 December 1938 | Drawn |

== International five-wicket hauls ==
A total of 40 Test match five-wicket hauls were taken on the ground.

== See also ==
- List of Test cricket grounds
