= Sydney Barnes =

English cricketer

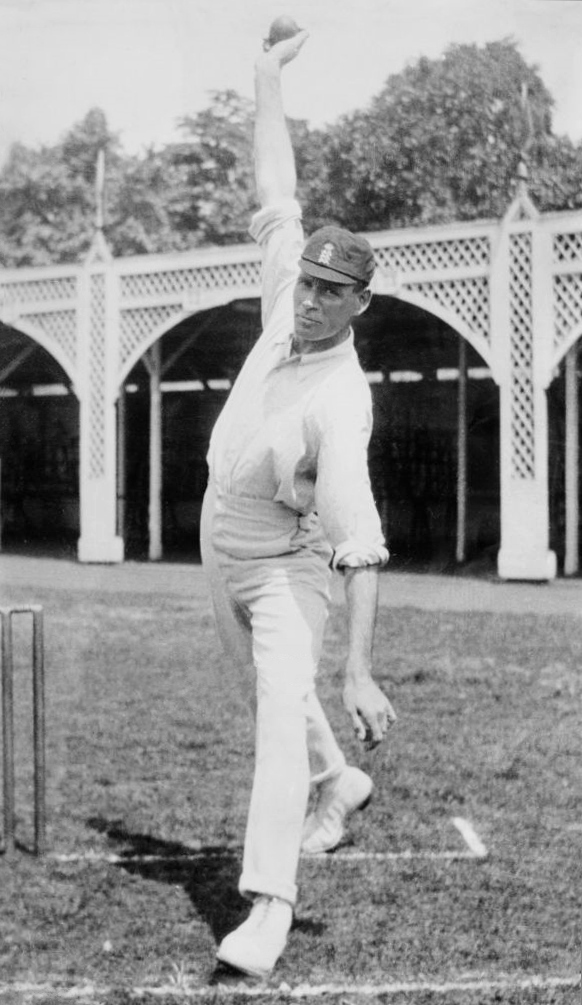
- Barnes in 1910

Personal information
- Full name: Sydney Francis Barnes
- Born: 19 April 1873; Smethwick, Staffordshire, England
- Died: 26 December 1967 (aged 94); Chadsmoor, Staffordshire, England
- Nickname: Barney
- Batting: Right-handed
- Bowling: Right-arm fast-medium Right-arm leg spin
- Role: Bowler

International information
- National side: England
- Test debut (cap 129): 13 December 1901 v Australia
- Last Test: 18 February 1914 v South Africa

Domestic team information
- Years: Team
- 1894–1896: Warwickshire
- 1899–1903: Lancashire
- 1904–1914, 1924–1935: Staffordshire
- 1927–1930: Wales
- 1929: Minor Counties

Career statistics
Competition	Test	FC	MCC
Matches	27	133	177
Runs scored	242	1,573	4,806
Batting average	8.06	12.78	21.36
100s/50s	0/0	0/2	3/19
Top score	38*	93	136
Balls bowled	7,873	31,430	30,699
Wickets	189	719	1376
Bowling average	16.43	17.09	7.99
5 wickets in innings	24	68	159
10 wickets in match	7	18	61
Best bowling	9/103	9/103	10/26
Catches/stumpings	12/–	72/–	113/–
- Source: CricketArchive, 30 January 2025

Sydney Francis Barnes (19 April 1873 – 26 December 1967) was an English professional cricketer who is regarded as one of the greatest bowlers of all time. He was right-handed and bowled at a pace that varied from medium to fast-medium with the ability to make the ball both swing and break from off or leg. In Test cricket, Barnes played for England in 27 matches from 1901 to 1914, taking 189 wickets at 16.43, one of the lowest Test bowling averages ever achieved. In 1911–12, he helped England to win the Ashes when he took 34 wickets in the series against Australia. In 1913–14, his final Test series, he took a world record 49 wickets in a Test series, against South Africa.

Barnes was unusual in that, despite a very long career as a top-class player, he spent little more than two seasons in first-class cricket, briefly representing Warwickshire (1894 to 1896) and Lancashire (1899 to 1903). Instead, he preferred league and minor counties cricket for mostly professional reasons. He had two phases playing for his native Staffordshire in the Minor Counties Championship from 1904 to 1914 and from 1924 to 1935. He played exclusively for Saltaire Cricket Club in the Bradford League from 1915 to 1923. In his wider career from 1895 to 1934, he variously represented several clubs in each of the Bradford, Central Lancashire, Lancashire and North Staffordshire leagues.

== Early life ==
Barnes was born on 19 April 1873 in Smethwick, Staffordshire. He was the second son of five children whose father, Richard, lived nearly all of his life in Staffordshire, working for 63 years at the Muntz Metal Company which was based at Selly Oak in Birmingham. His father did not play much cricket and Barnes was the only one of three brothers who ever "touched a bat or ball".

== Work outside cricket ==
Outside cricket, Barnes worked as a clerk in a Staffordshire colliery until 1914, and later at Staffordshire County Council, where he became skilful in calligraphy. Even into his nineties, his skill as an inscriber of legal documents was still in demand. In 1957, he was asked to present a handwritten scroll to Elizabeth II to commemorate her visit to Stafford.

== Cricket career ==
=== 1888 to 1894 ===
Barnes's career began in 1888 when he was fifteen and played for a small club which had a ground behind the Galton Hotel in Smethwick. Soon afterwards, he joined Smethwick Cricket Club and played for its third team. He was taught to bowl off spin by Billy Bird, the Smethwick professional who had played for Warwickshire, and then taught himself to bowl leg spin. In due course, he was selected for the second team and had earned a place in the first team, playing in the Birmingham and District Premier League, at the start of the 1893 season.

In 1894, when Barnes was a 21-year-old fast bowler, he was asked to join the ground staff of Staffordshire County Cricket Club but he found the terms unattractive. Instead, he joined Rishton Cricket Club in the Lancashire League where the pay was better than in any form of county cricket, largely because of match bonuses and collections. He played for Rishton until 1899. Wilfrid S. White commented that Barnes's career in league cricket "stands out unparalleled, unapproached, by any other player".

Later in the 1894 season, Barnes was invited to play for Warwickshire, who were due to enter the County Championship in 1895. His debut was in a minor match against Cheshire at Edgbaston on 20–21 August. Barnes bowled only 8 overs, taking none for 27, and the match was drawn. On 23 August, Barnes made his first-class debut for Warwickshire against Gloucestershire at Clifton College Close Ground, except that he did not take the field as play was restricted by bad weather to just 72 overs of his team's first innings, in which they reached 102–2.

=== 1895 to 1903 ===
Barnes played only three more times for Warwickshire: twice in May 1895 and once in June 1896. He took just three wickets in these matches, having bowled 86 overs and conceded 226 runs. Barnes finished with Warwickshire after they invited him to play in a match and then sent him a telegram telling him not to come because an amateur would be playing. So, he chose to play mostly for Rishton from 1895 to 1899, making 38 appearances and taking 411 wickets, his best season being 1898 when he took 96 wickets at 8.46. Barnes had been a fast bowler with Warwickshire but in his time at Rishton he reduced his pace to medium fast and experimented with spin.

Barnes's association with Lancashire began in 1899 when he played for the club's Second XI against Staffordshire in a match at the County Ground, Stoke-on-Trent, on 10 and 11 July. He took ten wickets in the match including a match-winning analysis of eight for 38 in the second innings. In August, he made his first-team debut for Lancashire and played in two County Championship matches against Sussex and Surrey but he had only moderate success with a best return of three for 99 against Surrey. He rejected an offer to join the Lancashire ground staff, preferring to remain in better-paid league cricket, which he could combine with full-time employment as a clerk in a Staffordshire colliery.

In 1900, Barnes left Rishton and joined Burnley Cricket Club, also in the Lancashire League. He did not represent Lancashire that season but reappeared in 1901 when he made two Second XI appearances against Yorkshire's Second XI and one County Championship match, the last match of the season in late August against Leicestershire at Old Trafford. This was a rain-interrupted draw but Barnes scored 32 runs and then took six for 70 in the Leicestershire first innings, reducing them to an all-out 140 in response to Lancashire's total of 328–8 declared. Lancashire wanted Barnes to sign for them in 1902, but Barnes, always financially aware, was unsure, as he considered first-class county cricket to be "a great deal of hard work for relatively little money", and he liked his arrangement with Burnley supplementing his full-time job.

Lancashire's captain was Archie MacLaren who was about to lead England in its tour of Australia in 1901–02. Despite Barnes's limited first-class career to this point, he was invited to join the squad. This came about because Lord Hawke refused to allow George Hirst and Wilfred Rhodes to travel but MacLaren had become, to quote White, "the first to see in Barnes a bowler of international calibre". Barnes's selection was a major surprise and considered to be "the most daring experiment in the history of the game". For Barnes, "job security was always a prime consideration" and he accepted the tour but with misgivings.

Barnes was a great success in Australia but his participation was cut short by a knee injury. He played against three state teams before making his Test debut against Australia on 13 December 1901 at Sydney Cricket Ground, where he took five for 65 in the first innings. Also making their debuts in this Test were Colin Blythe and Len Braund. Between them, the three debutant bowlers took all twenty Australian wickets as England won by an innings and 124 runs. Australia levelled the series in the second Test at Melbourne Cricket Ground, winning by 229 runs although Barnes had figures of six for 42 and seven for 121. Monty Noble trumped Barnes's effort with seven for 17 and six for 60. Although successful, taking nineteen wickets in the two Tests to add to the thirteen in his previous seven first-class matches, Barnes was over-bowled. He injured a knee in the third Test at Adelaide Oval and missed the remainder of the tour. He later said he was still far short of his best at the time, but he had established himself as a world-class bowler.

Differences arose between Barnes and MacLaren because Barnes was, in Derek Birley's words, "the arch-professional (who) expected due reward (for his efforts)". This was in stark contrast to MacLaren's "starry-eyed public school enthusiasm" and the two did not get on personally. After leaving Australia, the team were crossing the Tasman Sea in a storm which had them "fearing for their lives". At one point, MacLaren was heard to say: "Well, there's one consolation. If we go down, that bugger Barnes will go down with us".

Barnes was selected only once in England's home series against Australia in 1902. This was for the third Test, the only Test ever held at Bramall Lane in Sheffield, which Australia won by 143 runs. Barnes took six for 49 and one for 50, but Noble with 11 wickets was again Australia's matchwinner.

Despite his differences with MacLaren, Barnes became a first team regular at Lancashire through the 1902 and 1903 seasons, producing several successful performances, although he was still troubled in 1902 by the knee injury sustained on tour. In 1903, Barnes was in dispute with Lancashire about winter employment and being "much over-bowled". Near the end of the season, Barnes took part in the Gentlemen v Players match but was unfit and could only bowl one over. Comments were made in the press that it was unfair of Barnes to "claim a fee and then not perform". Barnes thought it unfair that he should be paid the same as teammates who did much less work. Lancashire were paying him £3 a week in summer and £1 in winter, whereas in the Lancashire League he could get £8 plus bonuses for playing Saturdays only. Barnes tried to get more from Lancashire and refused to sign a contract for 1904. Lancashire called his bluff and dropped him from the team for their final match of the season. Barnes went back to the leagues and minor counties for good and never played in the County Championship again.

The 1902 and 1903 seasons were the only ones between 1895 and 1934 in which Barnes did not play league cricket. He played in 22 first-class matches in 1902, taking 95 wickets at an average of 21.56 with a best analysis of six for 39 and one match in which he took 10 wickets. He is listed well down the national averages and his overall performance bears moderate comparison with that of, for example, Wilfred Rhodes who took 213 wickets at 13.15 with five ten-wicket matches. In 1903, Barnes made 24 appearances and took 131 wickets at 17.85. He was ninth of those bowlers who took 100 wickets; his best analysis was eight for 37 and he had three ten-wicket matches. 1903 was the only season in which Barnes took 100 wickets in an English first-class season, although he did capture 104 wickets in South Africa in 1913–14.

=== 1904 to 1914 ===
Barnes joined Staffordshire in 1904 and played in the Minor Counties Championship until 1914. He combined this with weekend league cricket, returning to the Lancashire League for the 1904 and 1905 seasons to play for Church. In 1906, he moved to the North Staffordshire League and was with Porthill to 1914. Barnes did not play first-class cricket again for over four years until he joined an occasional team playing against the South African tourists in September 1907. He toured Australia the following winter and the bulk of his Test career was played from then till 1914. He made eight appearances for the Players in the prestigious Gentlemen v Players series during this period, culminating in the July 1914 match.

Barnes returned to Test cricket when England toured Australia in 1907–08. This time, he played in all five Tests and took 24 wickets at 26.08 with a best performance of seven for 60. In the second Test, which England won by 1 wicket, it was Barnes's batting that was crucial as he shared stands of 34 for the ninth wicket with Joe Humphries and an unbeaten 39 for the last with Arthur Fielder. When the tourists played Western Australia, Barnes shared a stand with George Gunn of over 200 for the fifth wicket while scoring 93, his personal best in first-class cricket.

In the 1909 season, Barnes played in the last three of England's five Tests against Australia. In the third Test at Headingley, he took six for 63 in Australia's second innings but England lost by 126 runs. The fourth Test at Old Trafford was drawn, Barnes taking five for 56 in the first innings. In the final Test at The Oval, Barnes took two wickets in each innings of another drawn match. In 1910, Barnes was made a Wisden Cricketer of the Year.

Barnes joined the MCC tour of Australia in 1911–12 and played in all five Tests. In the first Test at Sydney, which England lost, captain Johnny Douglas shared the new ball with left-arm seamer Frank Foster. Barnes, disgusted at being made a change bowler, sulked and gave a performance that was well below par. At Melbourne, however, Douglas bowed to the pressure and surrendered the new ball to the Staffordshire bowler, who responded with a spell of four wickets for one run in his first five overs. His first four victims were Warren Bardsley, Charles Kelleway, Clem Hill and Warwick Armstrong. When Frank Foster dismissed Victor Trumper and Barnes added Roy Minnett, the home side were reduced to 38 for six. Barnes took 39 wickets in the series with three five-wicket hauls.

In the 1912 Triangular Tournament, Barnes played in all six of England's Tests, three each against Australia and South Africa. In the three matches against South Africa, he took 34 wickets for 282 runs.

In 1913–14, Barnes toured South Africa with MCC and played in the first four Tests of a five match series. He missed the last Test because of a financial disagreement. His 49 wickets on the matting pitches used in this series remains the world record for wickets taken in a Test series. In the second Test at the Old Wanderers ground in Johannesburg, he became the first bowler to take more than 15 wickets in a Test with figures of eight for 56 and nine for 103 resulting in a match analysis of seventeen for 159.

Only Jim Laker's match analysis of nineteen for 90 in 1956 has since surpassed this feat in Test cricket. Don Bradman recalled seeing Barnes at Old Trafford after Laker had destroyed Australia in that match. "Well, what did you think of that?", Bradman asked Barnes. He received the gruff reply that "no bugger ever got all ten when I was on at the other end", probably a reference to the fact that Laker's co-bowler Tony Lock did not take a wicket in the second innings (in the whole match, Lock took one for 106 in 69 overs).

Barnes took 189 Test wickets. His average of 16.43 and strike rate of 41.65 are the lowest amongst bowlers who have played in more than 25 Tests and taken more than 150 wickets, although Kagiso Rabada currently has a lower strike rate. His closest challenger is Alan Davidson, who took 186 wickets at 20.53. Barnes took his 150th Test match wicket in only his 24th Test, which is a world record. Next best are Waqar Younis and Yasir Shah (27 Tests each).

=== 1915 to 1923 ===
Barnes was 41 when the First World War began and so too old for military service. First-class cricket was shelved for the duration but league cricket continued and numerous top-class players including Jack Hobbs, Wilfred Rhodes and Frank Woolley signed up to play in the Bradford League. Barnes saw an advert placed by Saltaire Cricket Club in the Athletic News and applied for the role by saying: "Will I do?" From 1915 to 1923, he played exclusively and with great success for Saltaire. The club and their ground at Roberts Park had been founded in 1871 and they joined the Bradford League in 1905. They won the league three times (1917, 1918 and 1922) while Barnes played for them. On his debut in May 1915, he took eight for eight against Bowling Old Lane and followed that with all ten for fourteen against Baildon Green, including five wickets in five successive balls. In later seasons, he took all ten against Bowling Old Lane and Keighley.

Barnes knew full well his value to Saltaire and characteristically drove a hard bargain. There were several record crowd and gate receipt matches when he was playing, including one Priestley Cup final at Bradford Park Avenue, a first-class ground used by Yorkshire. Barnes started on £3 10s per match in 1915 plus travel and accommodation, though he did soon remove to Saltaire (and the club paid his removal costs). His match fee doubled in 1916 and had increased to £18 15s in 1922. Like all professionals operating in league cricket, he benefited from "pass the hat" crowd collections (performance rewards) at each game and, as an additional supplement, he secured a coaching role at Bradford Grammar School which is near Saltaire. Saltaire over-reached themselves somewhat and it took an effort to re-balance the books in the 1920s following Barnes's departure.

In total, Barnes took 904 wickets for Saltaire at an average of 5.26. He took a hundred wickets in a season five times, a rare feat in the Bradford League's history, and headed the bowling averages in every one of his nine seasons there. He had an average of under five in most seasons and even his highest was only seven, which is itself generally held to be a remarkable bowling average in any level of competition.

Fifteen years after Barnes left Saltaire, they signed the young Jim Laker, then a sixteen year old schoolboy who lived in nearby Baildon. Laker played for Saltaire through the 1938 to 1940 seasons. He joined the British Army in 1941 and spent the Second World War in Egypt. He did not develop his off break bowling skill until he joined the Army and at Saltaire he was recognised primarily as a promising batsman who was also a useful pace bowler. During that time, when he was attending a coaching class with Yorkshire at Headingley, Laker listened to a conversation between George Hirst and Herbert Sutcliffe who apparently did not often agree with each other about cricket, but Laker recalled Sutcliffe being in complete agreement with Hirst's view that "Sydney Barnes was the greatest bowler there has ever been and what's more the greatest bowler there ever will be". Around that time, Laker had watched Barnes, then in his sixties, when he guested in a Bradford League match. Laker recalled that Barnes's control of the ball was "still remarkable".

After Laker became an England bowler himself, he was able to meet Barnes and remembered one conversation in particular which took place at Lord's. Laker was impressed by Barnes's genuine enthusiasm and self-confidence. He had been told that Barnes would bowl such varied deliveries as an in-swinger, a fast off break and a leg-cutter all in the same over. Laker asked Barnes if that was true and Barnes said: "Keep trying something different". Laker heeded his advice.

=== 1924 to 1935 ===
Barnes declined an opportunity to join the tour to Australia in 1920–21, when he was 47 years old. He wanted to take his family with him, but it soon became clear that he would have to pay their traveling expenses. He was not selected by England nor did he seek selection by the Players after the First World War. He did not play first-class cricket again until 1927 when he was 54 years old. From then until 1930, he made nine appearances for Wales.

He left Saltaire after the 1923 season and returned to Staffordshire where he remained until 1935. As in his first spell with the county, he decided he would also play league cricket at weekends. From 1924 to 1930, this was in the Central Lancashire League, first with Castleton Moor (1924 to 1928) and then for Rochdale (1929 and 1930). He moved to Rawtenstall in the Lancashire League from 1931 to 1933. Then, aged 61, he returned to the Bradford League to play for Keighley in 1934, which was his final season in league cricket.

Barnes took 49 wickets for Wales in 1928, including seven for 51 and five for 67 in an eight wicket win over the touring West Indians. He also made two first-class appearances for the Minor Counties in 1929 and took eight for 41 in a drawn game against the South Africans at Stoke-on-Trent. Barnes's final first-class appearance was for Wales against Marylebone Cricket Club (MCC) at Lord's in 1930.

Barnes made a total of 177 appearances for Staffordshire in two spells from 1904 to 1914 and 1924 to 1935. His career record for Staffordshire was 1,432 wickets at an average of 8.03. Aged 62, he played twice for Staffordshire in 1935 and, although he did make occasional reappearances in later years, that was effectively the end of his cricketing career. His last match for Staffordshire was against Yorkshire Seconds on the Savile Park ground at Castleford on 3 & 4 July 1935 where he took none for 36 and one for 61.

== Approach and technique ==
Barnes bowled with consistent attacking intent, consistently making the batsmen play, and using ongoing variation.

He could bowl balls that swung and/or spun both ways, at a range of speeds (mostly fast-medium). He in particular delivered leg-breaks bowled at pace and without rotation of the wrist. The spin was derived purely from the twist exerted by his fingers (which were described as long) rather than through leverage of the wrist or elbow. Fielders at mid-off and mid-on reported hearing the snap of his fingers as he bowled, with the batsmen unable to read which way the ball would break.

Barnes was described as more than six feet tall and maintaining an erect posture with wide shoulders, a deep chest, long arms and strong legs – in John Arlott's view, "perfectly built to be a bowler". He bowled right arm fast-medium but also had what Arlott called "the accuracy, spin and resource of a slow bowler". Barnes's high delivery provided him with a lift off the pitch that forced even the best batsmen to play him at an awkward height. He was clever at concealing his pace and could produce deliveries that were both appreciably faster and slower than his usual fast-medium pace; and could bowl an effective yorker. Barnes considered himself essentially a spin bowler as he bowled both the off-break and the leg-break, but at a fast pace. Although technically formidable, Barnes allied his skillset to a hostile persona and great stamina which, Arlott says, "were reflected in constant, unrelenting probing for a batsman's weakness and then attacking it by surprise, each ball fitting into a tactical pattern". In Barnes's era, the same ball would be used for the whole of a team's innings, with no new ball, although bowlers were assisted by the unpredictability of uncovered pitches.

Harry Altham wrote of Barnes's bowling: "At appreciably more than medium pace he could, even in the finest weather and on the truest wickets in Australia, both swing and break the ball from off or leg. Most deadly of all was the ball which he would deliver from rather wide on the crease, move in with a late swerve the width of the wicket, and then straighten back off the ground to hit the off stump".

Bernard Hollowood played alongside Barnes for Staffordshire in the 1930s and quoted his father, Albert Hollowood, who had been Barnes's Staffordshire captain before the First World War, as saying: "Oh, yes, he could bowl 'em all, but he got his wickets with fast leg-breaks. Marvellous, absolutely marvellous, he was. Fast leg-breaks and always on a length".

The great Australian batsman Clem Hill told Neville Cardus that, on a perfect wicket, Barnes could swing the new ball in and out "very late", could spin from the ground, pitch on the leg stump and miss the off. This is evidence of Barnes's ability to deploy maximum variety in the space of a single over. Cardus remarked on Barnes's creativity as "one of the first bowlers really to use the seam of a new ball and combine swing so subtly with spin that few batsmen could distinguish one from the other".

Cardus described Barnes's "splendid upright action, right arm straight over". He ran on easy strides. Wilfred Rhodes recalled that Barnes carried the ball in his left hand until, a couple of strides from delivery, he switched it to the right.

== Personality ==
As for Barnes's controversial character, Cardus said that he was not an easy man to handle on the field of play because there was a "Mephistophelian aspect about him" in that (unlike the amateurs) he did not play cricket out of any "green field starry-eyed idealism".

Cardus said that Barnes was a hostile, attacking bowler.

Cardus said Barnes always made the batsman play the ball and Barnes himself said about later bowlers sending down so many balls the batsman need not play that, "I didn't. I never gave 'em any rest".

Barnes, said Cardus, was "relentless" and "blew a chill wind of antagonism", but he mellowed in full age and retirement. (Cardus, Wisden Obituary)

== Hollowood cartoons ==
Bernard Hollowood drew two cartoons of Barnes, which appear in his book Cricket on the Brain. One depicts him leaping in the air as he appeals for a dismissal and with his index finger raised as though he himself is adjudicating on the appeal. It is entitled "A.N. Other lbw Barnes.... 0". John Arlott wrote in his review of the book for the 1971 Wisden: "... his two caricatures of S. F. Barnes would seem transcendent if they were not outweighed by his chapter on that great bowler which is a fine passage of cricket literature ... this is a book of many and well-cut facets."

== Personal life ==
Barnes married Alice Maud Taylor (née Pearce) in 1903 and they had one child, a son called Leslie who took the photos for Wilfrid S. White's biography of Barnes. Barnes was Alice's second husband, following her divorce from George Taylor.

In later life, Barnes became friends with Pelham Warner, who was his exact contemporary, and they watched cricket together at Lord's.

Barnes died in 1967 at his home in Chadsmoor, Cannock, Staffordshire.

== Awards and tributes ==
In the 1963 edition of Wisden Cricketers' Almanack, Barnes was selected by Neville Cardus as one of the "Six Giants of the Wisden Century". This was a special commemorative selection requested by Wisden for its 100th edition. The other five players chosen were Don Bradman, W. G. Grace, Jack Hobbs, Tom Richardson and Victor Trumper. Soon afterwards, writing in the May 1963 edition of The Cricketer, John Arlott published a tribute to Barnes which commemorated his 90th birthday. Arlott wrote that of those who played with or against Barnes, "(they) had no doubt that he stood alone – the greatest bowler that ever lived". In 2008, when the "ICC Best-Ever Test Championship Ratings" were published, Barnes's retrospective rating of 932 at the end of the 1913/14 series was the highest ever achieved. In 2009, Barnes was an inaugural member of the ICC Cricket Hall of Fame. To mark 150 years of the Cricketers' Almanack, Wisden named him in an all-time Test World XI.

== See also ==
- List of international cricket five-wicket hauls by Sydney Barnes

== Sources ==
- Arlott, John (1984). Arlott on Cricket. Willow Books.
- Arlott, John (1971). Wisden Cricketers' Almanack. John Wisden & Co.
- Cardus, Neville (1968). Wisden Obituaries in 1968 – Sydney Barnes. John Wisden & Co.
- Gibbs, Peter (2012). A chill wind beyond the boundary. John Wisden & Co.
- Hill, Alan (1998). Jim Laker. Andre Deutsch.
- Hollowood, Bernard (1972). Cricket on the Brain. Sportsmans Book Club edition.
- White, Wilfrid S. (1945). Sydney Barnes: The Greatest Bowler of All Time. Birmingham: E.F. Hudson Ltd.

== Media ==
- Media related to Sydney Barnes at Wikimedia Commons
1. Sporting positions
  Preceded by William Solomon	Oldest Living Test Cricketer; 12 July 1964 – 26 December 1967	Succeeded by Wilfred Rhodes
  Records
  Preceded by Hugh Trumble	World Record – Most Career Wickets in Test cricket 189 wickets (16.83) in 27 Tests; Held record 13 December 1913 to 4 January 1936	Succeeded by Clarrie Grimmett
