= Dave Nourse =

South African cricketer

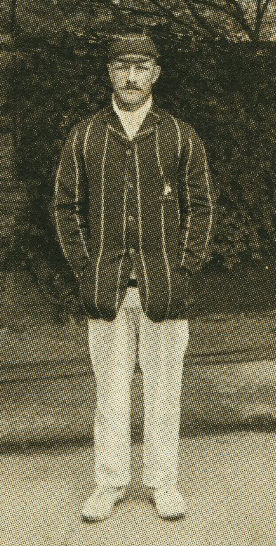

Cricket information
- Batting: Left-handed
- Bowling: Left-arm medium

International information
- National side: South Africa
- Test debut: 11 October 1902 v Australia
- Last Test: 19 August 1924 v England

Career statistics
Competition	Test	First-class
Matches	45	228
Runs scored	2,234	14,216
Batting average	29.78	42.81
100s/50s	1/15	38/60
Top score	111	304*
Balls bowled	3,234	17,683
Wickets	41	305
Bowling average	37.87	23.36
5 wickets in innings	0	13
10 wickets in match	0	1
Best bowling	4/25	6/33
Catches/stumpings	43/–	172/–
- Source: ESPNcricinfo, 16 August 2022

Arthur William "Dave" Nourse (26 January 1878 (some sources say 25 January 1879) – 8 July 1948) was a cricketer who played for Natal, Transvaal, Western Province and South Africa.

== Life and career ==
A left-handed batsman and left-arm medium-pace swing bowler, Nourse was the mainstay of the South African Test team for more than 20 years and had a first-class cricket career of almost 40 years. He played 45 consecutive Tests from 1902 to 1924 and while his batting was dogged rather than dynamic, career figures that show only one Test century and a batting average under 30 do scant justice to his value to his team.

Nourse went to South Africa as a drummer with the West Riding Regiment in 1895 and stayed there, making his first-class cricket debut for Natal two years later. In his first Test, against Australia at Johannesburg in October 1902, he scored 72, and his first Test wicket followed in the next match. Perhaps his greatest Test match was the first game of the England tour in 1905–06, when South Africa gained its first-ever victory against England. Batting at No 8 and arriving with the score at 105 for six wickets, Nourse hit an unbeaten 93 and, with a last-wicket partnership of 48 with Percy Sherwell, took South Africa to an unlikely target of 284.

Nourse toured England three times, in 1907, 1912 and 1924, and went to Australia in 1910–11. At the age of 46, he scored 1928 runs on the 1924 tour. His one Test century came in 1921–22 against Australia at Johannesburg, when he scored 111; he topped the South African batting averages in that series. In other innings, he passed 50 no fewer than 15 times. In an era when South African cricket was dominated by leg break and googly bowlers, Nourse sometimes opened the bowling for the Test team and he took 41 Test wickets. He also took 43 catches.

Nourse was the highest-ever scorer in South African domestic cricket, appearing for Natal from 1897 to 1925, for Transvaal for two seasons after that, and then for Western Province through to the age of 58 in the 1935–36 season, when he scored 55 against the Australians in his last first-class match. His highest first-class innings was 304 not out for Natal against Transvaal in 1920.

Nourse's obituary in Wisden says that he was known for so long as "Dave" that he adopted David as his middle name in preference to William. It also gives a long list of his careers outside cricket: "a soldier, a railway guard, billiard marker, saloon keeper, commercial traveller, manager of an athletic outfitters and finally coach to Cape Town University".

His son, Dudley Nourse, was also a Test cricketer who played 34 times for South Africa.
