= Flooi du Toit =

South African cricketer (1869–1909)

- du Toit in 1892

Personal information
- Full name: Jacobus Francois du Toit
- Born: 2 April 1869; Jacobsdal, Orange Free State
- Died: 10 July 1909 (aged 40); Lindley, South Africa
- Nickname: Flooi
- Batting: Right-handed
- Bowling: Left-arm medium

International information
- National side: South Africa
- Only Test (cap 16): 19 March 1892 v England

Career statistics
| Competition | Tests | First-class |
|---|---|---|
| Matches | 1 | 1 |
| Runs scored | 2 | 2 |
| Batting average | – | – |
| 100s/50s | 0/0 | 0/0 |
| Top score | 2* | 2* |
| Balls bowled | 85 | 85 |
| Wickets | 1 | 1 |
| Bowling average | 47.00 | 47.00 |
| 5 wickets in innings | 0 | 0 |
| 10 wickets in match | 0 | 0 |
| Best bowling | 1/47 | 1/47 |
| Catches/stumpings | 1/– | 1/– |
- Source: Cricinfo

Jacobus Francois "Flooi" du Toit (2 April 1869 – 10 July 1909) was a South African cricket player of the 1890s. He was later a magistrate.

Du Toit was born in April 1869 in Jacobsdal in Orange Free State, where his father was a minister in the Dutch Reformed Church. He was nicknamed "Flooi", Afrikaans for "flea", a common nickname at the time for short people. The family moved to Brandfort in Orange Free State in 1880, and du Toit finished his schooling in Bloemfontein and joined the civil service there.

Flooi du Toit has the distinction of making a combined first-class and Test debut. He was the Orange Free State XXII's most successful bowler in their match against W. W. Read's English team in March 1892, taking five wickets and making useful runs. Along with Godfrey Cripps, Charles Fichardt and Ernest Halliwell, also combined debutants, du Toit was selected to play for South Africa in the only Test match the English team played on that tour, which began a few days later. In a match England won by an innings and 189 runs, du Toit scored 0 not out and 2 not out, took one wicket (the England captain's) for 47 runs, and held one catch. He and Fichardt were the second and third Afrikaners to play Test cricket for South Africa; Nicolaas Theunissen had been the first in 1889.

After rising in the civil service from clerk to magistrate's clerk to acting court registrar, du Toit was appointed chief clerk and public prosecutor in Jagersfontein in 1896, and resident magistrate in Jacobsdal in 1900. He married Louisa Harriett Streak in Mafeking in December 1902, and they had three children. He was appointed resident magistrate in Lindley, in Orange River Colony, in 1906. He died in Lindley on 10 July 1909, aged 40.
