= Krom Hendricks =

South African cricketer

William Henry 'Krom' Hendricks was a South African cricketer. Hendricks was considered the fastest bowler in South Africa in the 1890s. He suffered from the racial segregation in South Africa throughout his career, particularly in a much publicised prevention of him touring England in 1894. He instead made gradually reduced appearances in South African domestic cricket.

== Career ==
Hendricks was born to a father with Dutch ancestry, and a mother who hailed from St Helena, and was classified as 'coloured' in South Africa. His 'Krom' nickname derived from Afrikaans for "bent or crooked." There is little information available on his early life. He was born 15 October 1857 in the Bo-Kaap, Cape Town.

Hendricks played in a Combined Malay XI against Walter Read's touring England team on 2 March 1892, where he took four wickets for 50 runs. He also batted at six, making eight and five. He was described by Test cricketers George Rowe and Bonnor Middleton as "one of the fastest bowlers they had witnessed". His wickets were not included in the tour averages, however he "earned the published respect of the visitors as the fastest, most challenging legitimate bowler in South Africa, one whom batsmen were keen to avoid." He was singled out by Read as being "central to any SA side that might be selected to tour England" and many white members of the South African Cricket Association and local newspapers advocated for his inclusion in the South African team to tour England in 1894.

Transvaal and Western Province both called for Hendricks' inclusion in the 1894 tour of England. Walter Read said that if they were to send one player on the tour, to send Hendricks. However, political pressure from the Prime Minister of the Cape Colony, Cecil Rhodes, saw the head of cricket in South Africa, Sir William Milton leave Hendricks out of the South African touring team because of his race. The official decision was ruled as it was seen to be "impolitic to include him in the team." Harry Cadwallader, secretary of SACA, suggested Hendricks travel on the tour as a baggage master, an offer Hendricks publicly refused. Augustus Bernard Tancred made a statement alluding that Hendricks would never be treated equally if he did travel.

Hendricks was never selected to play for his national team, and the media used Hendricks' case as an illustration of the need for racial segregation. South African first-class cricketer and historian André Odendaal described Hendricks' exclusion as "entrench[ing] segregation in South African cricket and confirm[ing] that the English political and sports establishments were responsible for this."

Later in 1894, Hendricks performed strongly in a Cape Town cricket competition, prompting calls for him to represent the Colonial Born side against an invitation Mother Country team, however he was not allowed to join the team and Western Province omitted him from their squad. He was again prohibited from facing England in the winter of 1895–96, and from appearing in a league championship in 1897. Support from Western Province fell away, as their Cricket Board voted eleven to three to not include him in their team.
