= Kempis =

Kempis is a surname, and may refer to:

- George Kempis (1871–1948), South African cricketer
- Gus Kempis (1865–1890), South African Test cricketer
- Indira Kempis Martínez, Mexican politician
- Nicolaes a Kempis (d. 1676), composer
- Joannes Florentius a Kempis (1635 – c.1711), Baroque composer, son of Nicholaus à Kempis
- Thomas à Kempis (c.1380 – 1471), late Medieval Catholic monk

== See also ==
- Mid-Canada Line Site 070 Kempis
