= Charlie Llewellyn =

South African cricketer (1876–1964)

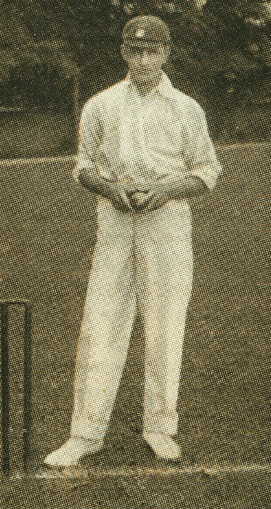
- Llewellyn in about 1905

Personal information
- Full name: Charles Bennett Llewellyn
- Born: 29 September 1876; Pietermaritzburg, Colony of Natal
- Died: 7 June 1964 (aged 87); Chertsey, Surrey, England
- Nickname: Buck
- Batting: Left-handed
- Bowling: Slow left-arm wrist-spin

International information
- National side: South Africa
- Test debut (cap 33): 2 March 1896 v England
- Last Test: 12 August 1912 v England

Domestic team information
- Years: Team
- 1894/95-1897/98: Natal
- 1899–1910: Hampshire

Career statistics
| Competition | Test | First-class |
|---|---|---|
| Matches | 15 | 267 |
| Runs scored | 544 | 11,425 |
| Batting average | 20.14 | 26.75 |
| 100s/50s | 0/4 | 18/52 |
| Top score | 90 | 216 |
| Balls bowled | 2,292 | 45,372 |
| Wickets | 48 | 1,013 |
| Bowling average | 29.60 | 23.41 |
| 5 wickets in innings | 4 | 82 |
| 10 wickets in match | 1 | 20 |
| Best bowling | 6/92 | 9/55 |
| Catches/stumpings | 7/– | 175/– |
- Source: Cricinfo, 20 April 2019

Charles Bennett "Buck" Llewellyn (29 September 1876 – 7 June 1964) was a South African cricketer who played in fifteen Test matches for South Africa and had an extensive domestic career in English county cricket with Hampshire, and later in club cricket in the North of England. Born in Pietermaritzburg to a Welsh father and a mother, reputedly of colour, from Saint Helena, Llewellyn's racial status and later allegations of racial discrimination would become a contentious subject both during and after his career. An all-rounder, he began his first-class career in South Africa with Natal in the 1894–95 Currie Cup. His subsequent performances as a slow left-arm wrist-spinner led to his Test selection for South Africa in March 1896. His Test career was sporadic, spanning fifteen matches to 1912. He was one of the first bowlers in international cricket to bowl slow left-arm wrist spin, and is credited with being the inventor of the chinaman, a delivery equivalent to a leg spinners googly.

With the encouragement of the Hampshire cricketer Robert Poore, Llewellyn left South Africa in 1899 to play county cricket in England for Hampshire. After completing his two-year residential qualification period he established himself as an all-rounder in the Hampshire side, forming a successful bowling partnership with Hesketh Hesketh-Prichard and later with Jack Newman. In 1910 he was chosen as one of five Wisden Cricketers of the Year. He played for Hampshire until 1910, when he left to pursue a career in club cricket with Accrington in the Lancashire League. For Hampshire, he made 196 first-class appearances, scoring 8,772 runs and taking 711 wickets. He achieved the double of a thousand runs and a hundred wickets in a season on three occasions in first-class cricket. He continued to play club cricket in northern England until 1938. In retirement, he moved to Chertsey, where he died following a gas explosion at his residence in June 1964.

== Cricket career ==
=== Career in South Africa ===
Llewellyn was born out of wedlock in Pietermaritzburg on 29 September 1876 to a Welsh father, Thomas Buck Llewellyn, from Pembroke and a Saint Helenan mother, Ann Elizabeth Rich, who was reputedly coloured. The ethnicity of his mother has variously been described as black, Madagascan, or Indian; the latter two would categorise her as a Cape Malay. His father was employed as a painter and decorator, later forming his own successful business. Despite his reputed mixed-race heritage, his fair skin colour saw him regarded as a "white man" (Wilfred Rhodes described Llewellyn as looking "like a rather sunburned English player") by the South African Cricket Board of Control (SACBOC), thus helping to clear a racial hurdle to him progressing in the game; this contrasted with other coloured players of the time, where the racism of late nineteenth-century South Africa had led to leading non-white players being prevented from pursuing the sport as a career. Before coming to prominence as a cricketer, Llewellyn was employed in Durban by the father of the cricketer Herbie Taylor as a "coloured clerk", an employment he maintained as his early cricket career developed.

Aged 18, Llewellyn made his debut in first-class cricket for Natal against Transvaal at Pietermaritzburg in the 1894–95 Currie Cup, taking match figures of 4 for 71 with his slow left-arm wrist-spin bowling. His performance did not equate immediate success to the Natal selectors, and it was not be until the following season that he played for Natal again. On this occasion, he was chosen to play for a Natal XV against Lord Hawke's touring England XI; his steady bowling performance in the match led to his selection in the South African team for the Second Test against England at Johannesburg in March 1896. In a match dominated by England, Llewellyn bowled 14 wicketless overs in England's only innings, conceding 71 runs, and was not retained for the Third Test. During the tour, he also featured for a Pietermaritzburg XV against the tourists, taking seven wickets in the match and impressing the Hampshire batsman Robert Poore, who was in South Africa on military service with the British Army.

Following his Test debut, it was over a year before he played first-class cricket again. He made three appearances in the 1896–97 Currie Cup for Natal, with success. Against Western Province, he took match figures of 9 for 128, claiming his maiden five wicket haul in the process; he followed this up with match figures of 11 for 123 against Eastern Province. His three appearances yielded 30 wickets at an average of 12.13, taking five wickets in an innings on five occasions and best figures of 7 for 73. He began the following season by playing in a first-class match for Natal against Abe Bailey's Transvaal XI, before making three appearances in the 1897–98 Currie Cup. He took 16 wickets in his Currie Cup matches that season, with his consistent performances earning him a recall to the South African Test side. He played in the First Test against England at Johannesburg in February 1899, but despite taking five wickets in the match, he was not retained for the Second Test.

=== Move to England ===
==== Early years ====
At the end of the 1898–99 series Llewellyn, left South Africa to play for English county side Hampshire as a professional, on the recommendation of Poore. In order to play for Hampshire in the County Championship, he had to qualify to play for Hampshire through a two-year residency period, the first year of which was sponsored by Hampshire. He spent his two-year qualification period living at Charles Hoare's training establishment Mercury. He made his debut for Hampshire in a first-class match against the touring Australians at Southampton in August 1899, with immediate success. With the ball, he took figures of 8 for 132 in the Australians first innings, and batting he made scores of 72 and 21. As a result of his performance against the Australians, Llewellyn was chosen as one of Ranjitsinhji's twelve-man touring team to North America in the winter of 1899. He played in five matches during the touring, including two first-class matches against the Gentlemen of Philadelphia, taking eight wickets across the two first-class fixtures. He did not feature in any first-class matches for Hampshire in 1900, but did play a minor match against the touring West Indians, taking 13 wickets across the match and scoring 93 runs in Hampshire's first innings.

By the following season, Llewellyn had successfully completed his two-year residential qualification period. He made his County Championship debut in 1901 against Lancashire at Portsmouth. In eighteen appearances that season, he took 115 wickets at an average of 23.25; his bowling average that season was the best by a Hampshire player since their admission to the County Championship in 1895. During the season, he took five wickets in an innings on fifteen occasions and ten-wickets in a match on four. His best bowling figures during the season of 8 for 72 led Hampshire to a 121 runs victory against Leicestershire. Against Somerset in August, he scored 153 runs in just over 90 minutes and took match figures of 10 for 183. The cricket historian Patrick Allen credited Llwellyn with carrying Hampshire's weak bowling attack in 1901, with him delivering over 2,000 balls more than Victor Barton. His all-round credentials were further enhanced by scoring 1,025 runs across the season, with two centuries. His maiden first-class century came at Southampton against the touring South Africans, when he made 216 runs in three hours. His performance subsequently led to him being asked to assist the South Africans in two tour matches against London County and Liverpool and District, where he took 25 wickets and scored two half-centuries. His performances in 1901 were said to have "[changed] the face of Hampshire cricket". Amongst all-rounders in the 1901 season, he was third only to George Hirst and Jack Mason in terms of runs scored and wickets taken.

His impressive bowling form continued the following season, with Llewellyn taking 170 wickets at an average of 18.61 from 26 matches. In the County Championship, he took 94 wickets at an average of 17.67; his tally of wickets was 56 more than Hampshire's next highest wicket-taker, Hesketh Hesketh-Prichard. He spent the early part of the season playing for W. G. Grace's London County, for whom he took his career-best bowling figures of 9 for 55 against Cambridge University at Crystal Palace, which included three wickets in four balls. Despite his bowling efforts, London County lost the match by 5 wickets. Llewellyn scored 832 first-class runs at an average of 21.33 in 1902, recording one century (109 runs) against Derbyshire in the County Championship in August. Such was his form in 1902, that he was selected in Englands fourteen-man squad for the First Test of the 1902 Ashes Series against Australia at Edgbaston, but did not make the starting eleven. His inclusion was controversial to the Australians, with Warwick Armstrong allegedly questioning if Australia were playing England or South Africa. Toward the end of the Australians tour, he played against them for the Players at Harrogate; as a paid professional he was eligible to represent the Players, in contrast to unpaid amateurs who played for the Gentlemen.

==== Returning to Test cricket and loss of form ====
Llewellyn returned to South Africa in the winter of 1902, where he was selected in the South African team to play Australia on their maiden tour of South Africa, that followed their tour of England. In the drawn First Test at Johannesburg, he batted at batted at number three, scoring 90 runs, his highest Test score, in South Africa's first innings, whilst sharing in a partnership of 173 runs for the second wicket with Louis Tancred. Their partnership was a South African record for the second wicket against Australia, remaining so until it was broken by Hashim Amla and Graeme Smith in 2011. He took 6 for 92 in Australia's first innings, with overall match figures of 9 for 216. In the Second Test, also played at Johannesburg, he played an important role with the ball, taking figures of 5 for 43 and 5 for 73 in the Australian's innings', though could not stop South Africa losing the match by 159 runs. In the Third Test, played at Cape Town, Llewellyn took figures of 6 for 97 in the Australian's first innings, but was unable to stop South Africa succumbing to defeat by ten wickets. He led the South African bowling with 25 wickets at an average of 17.92; the next highest South African wicket-taker was Jimmy Sinclair with nine. Llewellyn tried to resume his domestic career in South Africa with Transvaal, but his status as a professional was deemed unacceptable by some in South African cricket. Put to a vote by the SACBOC, his inclusion in the Transvaal side was voted down by the three Cape unions, and with the absentation of the Natal union, he was debarred from participating in domestic cricket by the SACBOC.

Returning to England for the 1903 season, Llewellyn played four first-class matches for the Marylebone Cricket Club at Lord's in May, followed by another in June. For Hampshire in the 1903 County Championship, he lost his bowling form, with Allen remarking that "staleness" had crept into his bowling. In the County Championship, he took 39 wickets at an average of 39.64, a significantly higher average when compared to previous seasons, and claimed five wickets in an innings just once. His 542 runs placed him second behind Edward Sprot's 835 runs in Hampshire's batting aggregates. His best performance for Hampshire during the season came against the touring Gentlemen of Philadelphia, when he scored an unbeaten century (136 runs) and took figures of 6 for 109 in the Philadelphian's only innings. During the season, he also played one match each for London County against Gloucestershire and for the Players of the South against the Gentlemen of the South at the end of the season. Llewellyn's bowling form for Hampshire did not improve in 1904, with him taking 40 wickets in the County Championship at an average of 37.15, and once again took five wickets in an innings just once. He scored 411 runs at an average of 14.94 from seventeen Championship appearances. He was utilised by the touring South Africans during the 1904 season, where his performances contrasted with those for Hampshire. He made six first-class appearances for the South Africans during their tour, taking 16 wickets at an average of 25.31 and scoring 338 runs at an average of 56.33. He was again selected to play for the Players of the South against the Gentlemen of the South at the conclusion of the season. His bowling struggles in 1903 and 1904 had led to him being termed by "an utter failure" by Wisden.

Llewellyn encountered his worst season as a bowler in county cricket in 1905, when he took just 33 wickets at an average of 37.18. His struggles during this period would later be attributed by Wisden in 1911 to him being overworked, due to him sharing much of the burden of carrying the Hampshire attack with Hesketh-Pritchard. Whilst he struggled for form as a bowler, he batted consistently during the season. He scored 1,280 runs from 22 matches at an average of 35.55, whilst contributing several noteworthy performances. Against Derbyshire in the County Championship he scored two centuries in the match, making 102 and 100. In the season concluding Players of the South versus Gentlemen of the South match at Bournemouth, he made 186 runs in the Players of the South first innings; in their total of 496 all out, the next highest score was 73 runs, made by opening batsman Frederick Bowley. prior to the match, he had represented an England XI against the touring Australians, with both matches forming part of the Bournemouth Cricket Week. He returned to form as a bowler whilst playing exclusively for Hampshire in first-class cricket in 1906, taking 47 wickets at an average of 26.25. His batting form remained consistent, with Llewellyn scoring 1,013 runs at an average of 31.65, placing him second behind Sprot in Hampshire's Championship batting aggregates.

==== Wisden Cricketer of the Year ====
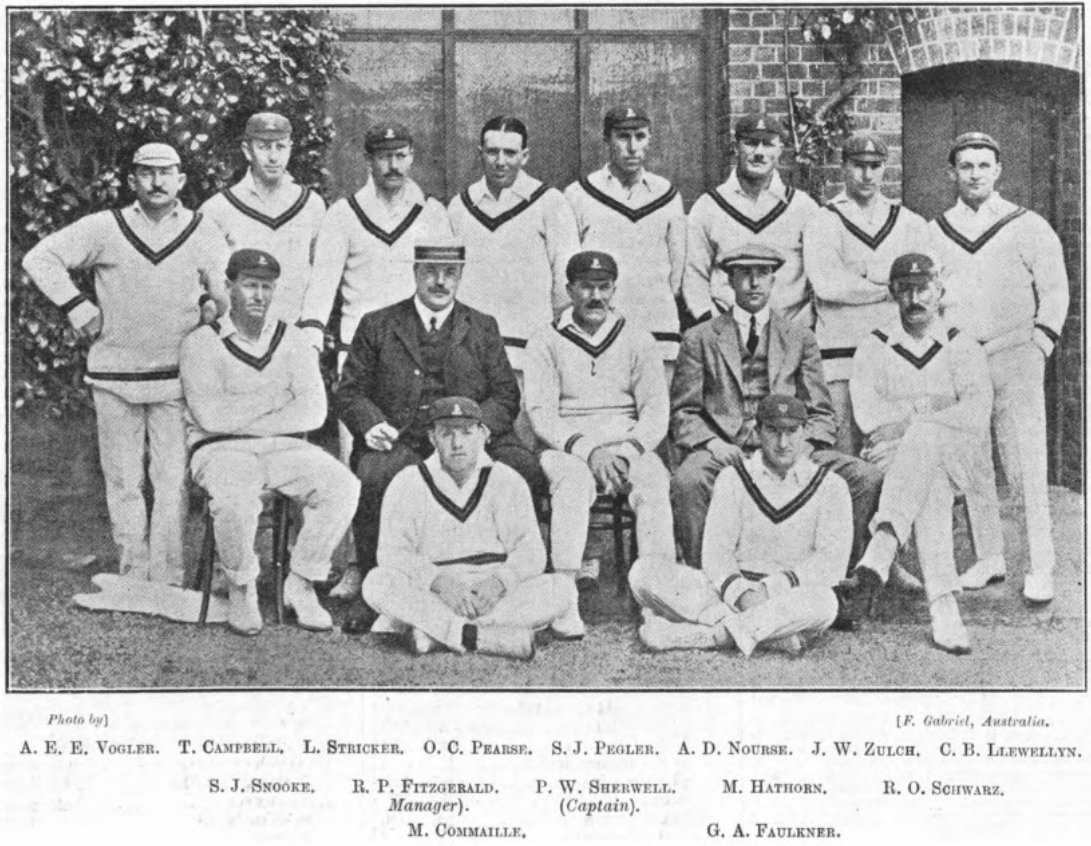
The South African team (pictured) that toured Australia in 1910–11

His return to form with the ball continued into the 1907 season, with Llewellyn taking 45 wickets at an average of 21.28. In November 1907, he was afforded a benefit match against Kent, which was to be played in July the following season; his benefit raised £500, then a Hampshire record. The 1908 season resulted in better all-round performances by Llewellyn. Playing in 29 first-class matches across the season, he took 102 wickets at an average of 25.13, claiming five wickets in an innings on three occasions; his tally included 75 wickets in the County Championship, just two wickets behind Hampshire's leading wicket-taker that season, Jack Newman. The remainder of his 27 first-class wickets in 1908 were distributed across appearances for the MCC, Gerry Weigall's personal eleven, and for a Hambledon XII in a commemorative first-class match against an England XI at Broadhalfpenny Down. Across the season, he scored 1,347 runs at an average of 28.06. He scored three centuries, two for Hampshire against Middlesex and Sussex, and one for the MCC against Worcestershire. He took 45 first-class wickets in 1909, at an average of 26.17, and again passed a thousand runs in the season (1,212), averaging 35.64 and making three centuries; two of these came in the same match against Sussex, with Llewellyn making scores of 130 and an unbeaten 101, the latter made in under an hour. At the end of the 1909 season, he played for the South against the touring Australians at Hastings.

In the 1910 season, he formed a potent partnership with Newman, with the pair combining to take 299 of the 422 wickets that fell to Hampshire in the County Championship. Llewellyn himself took 133 Championship wickets at an average of 20.45, taking five wickets in an innings on eleven occasions. His overall first-class return from 26 matches in 1910 was 152 wickets at an average of 19.27. He scored 1,232 runs at an average of 35.64, making four centuries. Against Kent at Dover in the County Championship, he scored 91 runs in an hour. His innings included six sixes, five of which came from the bowling of Colin Blythe. Commenting on his innings, Wisden remarked that it was "one of the most dazzling innings of the year". As a result of his performances in 1910, he was named one of Wisden's Five Cricketers of the Year. At the end of the season, the Hampshire committee disagreed with the terms for a new contract, resulting in him leaving Hampshire.

Prior to him leaving, Llewellyn had been given permission by Hampshire to play for South Africa in the winter, following his recall for their tour of Australia in 1910–11. Had it not been for his subsequent disagreement with the committee, his recall might have necessitated the end of his career at Hampshire, losing him his qualification to play county cricket. The rules in 1910 forbid a cricketer qualified to play in county cricket from playing for more than two counties in a calendar year, with a British Colony, dependency or state being considered a county. Thus, he would have been excluded from county cricket until 1913. His inclusion on the tour was controversial in South Africa, with his home province of Natal writing to the SACBOC in protest, opining that "he can no longer be looked upon as a South African player". He played in all five Test matches on the tour, but did not have success bowling. He took 14 wickets at an average of 39.92, His bowling proved ineffective against the Australian top-order, particularly when bowling to Victor Trumper. He scored 198 runs across the five Tests, making one half-century (80 runs) in the Third Test at Adelaide, which contributed toward their only Test victory on the tour. He had limited success in the first-class tour matches against Australian state sides.

==== League cricket and final Tests ====
With a family of four children to support, Llewellyn returned to England in 1911, where he joined Accrington as their professional; in doing so, he became the first Test cricketer to play in the Lancashire League. While playing for Accrington in 1912, he was selected by South Africa to play in the Triangular Tournament. In the tournaments second match, South Africa played England at Lord's, with Llewellyn top-scoring with 75 runs in South Africa's second innings. He played in five of South Africa's six Test matches in the tournament, registering a further half-century (59 runs) in the fifth match against Australia at Lord's. His bowling during the tournament was ineffective, with Llewellyn taking 4 wickets at an average of 54.75; as a result, his bowling was described as a "sad failure" by Wisden. These Test matches were to be his final international appearances, in addition to his final appearances in first-class cricket.

Returning to the Lancashire League, he scored an unbeaten 188 against Bacup in 1913, which was the highest individual score in the league until 1939, when it was broken by Learie Constantine in 1939. Aided by the soft wickets found in Lancashire, which were conducive to his bowling, Llewellyn's bowling record for Accrington was prolific, and he took 967 league wickets for the club. He left Accrington in 1915, joining Undercliffe in the Bradford League, before returning to Accrington in 1921. He left Accrington for a second time in 1926, joining Radcliffe in the Bolton Cricket League, becoming the first player to take a hundred wickets in a season in the league. He left Radcliffe in 1932, returning to the Lancashire League to play for East Lancashire. He ended his club career with East Lancashire in 1938, at the age of 62.

==== Playing style and records ====
An animation showing the trajectory of a left-arm wrist spin delivery

Llewellyn developed his bowling under the guidance of Reggie Schwarz. Bowling with a high-arm action, he possessed the ability to impart vicious spin on the ball. He also contained within his bowling repertoire the chinaman, a delivery that was the equivalent of a leg spinners googly, turning from right to left on the pitch. John Arlott later wrote that he bowled the chinaman with considerable accuracy, particularly on wickets which were not conducive to spin bowling. It is speculated that he learnt this variation from Bernard Bosanquet, the inventor of the googly, with whom he toured North America in the winter of 1899. As such, Llewellyn is often credited with being the inventor of the chinaman, with its etymology potentially being a guarded reference to his mixed-race heritage, specifically his possible maternal Cape Malay descent. He was able to vary the pace of his deliveries, with the manner in which he did so being described as "puzzling" by the Dundee Courier when reporting on his Hampshire debut. A peer at Accrington remarked that he possessed "an uncanny instinct of being able to assess, almost at a glance, the strengths and weaknesses of opposing batsmen". One of the first left-arm wrist spin bowlers in international cricket, he took 48 Test wickets at an average of 29.60 from fifteen matches, claiming five or more wickets in an innings on four occasions and ten wickets in a match once. In all first-class cricket, he took 1,103 wickets at an average of 23.41 from 267 matches; he took five wickets in an innings on 82 occasions, and ten wickets in a match on twenty. He was the first player to bowl left-arm wrist spin with any regularity in England. For Hampshire, he took 711 wickets at an average of 24.66 from 196 matches; in terms of wickets taken for Hampshire, Llewellyn ranks tenth.

As a left-handed batsman, Wisden alluded to Llewellyn's destructive nature as a batsman, proclaiming him in 1911 as "one of the most punishing left-handers". The cricket journalist Christopher Martin-Jenkins opined that he was a "forceful batsman", with Arlott considering him "quick-scoring". With his strokeplay, he was particularly adept at cutting and driving the ball. The Nottingham Evening Post observed that his batting was "not elegant", and also claimed that he had a "profound contempt for [batting] averages". This appraisal of his batting elegance was contrasted by the author Harry Pearson, who described it as "devastatingly stylish". In Tests, he scored 544 runs at an average of 20.14, making four half-centuries with a top-score of 90. In all first-class cricket, he scored 11,425 runs at an average of 26.75, making eighteen centuries and 52 half-centuries. For Hampshire, he scored 8,772 runs at an average of 27.58. His abilities as an all-rounder drew praise from Plum Warner, who termed him a "fine all-rounder", whilst Wisden affirmed that he was "in the fullest sense of the words an all-rounder". Llewellyn achieved the double of a thousand runs and a hundred wickets in a season on three occasions, doing so in 1901, 1908 and 1910. Discussing his abilities as a fielder, Wisden remarked that he was a "splendid fielder, particularly at mid-off". He took 174 catches in first-class cricket.

== Later life and death ==
Llewellyn moved to Surrey in 1939, relocating to Chertsey. In later life, he continued to take a keen interest in Hampshire cricket. He broke his thigh in 1960, the year of his 60th wedding anniversary, affecting his movement for the remainder of his life. He died, aged 87, on 7 June 1964, following a gas explosion at his Chertsey residence. He was survived by his wife and their four daughters. Llewellyn was buried in Chertsey.

== Alleged racial discrimination ==
Llewellyn was subject to conflicting reports of discrimination on account of his ethnicity by cricketing authorities in South Africa and his South African teammates alike. There are anecdotal claims of racial prejudice during the 1910–11 tour of Australia. With South Africa losing the series 4–1, dressing room tensions arose, and it is alleged that the complexion of Llewellyn's skin colour became an issue. It was alleged that he was bullied by his teammates, chiefly Jimmy Sinclair. The cricket historian Rowland Bowen commented that he was bullied to such an effect by his teammates "that he took refuge in the WCs and locked himself in". However, these claims have been contradicted. First, by Llewellyn's own denial that any discrimination of bullying against him took place on the tour, and secondly by Sinclair's prior support for Llewellyn's inclusion in the South African team in 1901, and his encouragement for Llewellyn to pursue a professional career in England. His later opposition to his inclusion in the South African team may have stemmed from a personal opinion that he had spent so long away from South Africa, that he could no longer be considered South African, alongside a belief that in the latter part of his career he was no longer up to the standards required at Test level.

A further suggestion of discrimination came from his erratic Test career – fifteen matches spread over sixteen years. The racial prejudice of the South African selectors at the time has been cited as a reason for his intermittent Test career. The SACBOC had previously omitted players based on their race, as was the case with the Malayan-descended bowler Krom Hendricks, who had been left out of the South African team to tour England in 1894 at the behest of the Cape Colony government. However, Llewellyn's omission from the South African Test side might be more succinctly explained by the fact that he was based in England, making his availability not always possible. Any ambiguity toward Llewellyn by the cricketing authorities in South Africa, whilst possibly being motivated by race, might have come from the hostile attitude toward professional cricketers, at the height of amateurism in the sport.

Twelve years after his death, his daughter Agatha, in a letter to The Cricketer, denied that her father was "coloured", asserting that her grandmother had been an English-born white woman from Essex and that he had come from "white stock". She denied that he had been subject to any form of discrimination in South Africa, by either cricketing authorities or teammates, and that what had been suggested by Bowen was "utter nonsense". She claimed that in his Bradford and Lancashire League years, he was often visited by members of touring South African teams and maintained friendships with them.

== Works cited ==
- Carter, Andy (2019). Beyond the Pale: Early Black and Asian Cricketers in Britain 1868-1945. Market Harborough: Troubador Publishing Limited. ISBN 978-1-8385-9202-8.
- Desai, Ashwin (2002). Blacks in Whites: A Century of Cricket Struggles in KwaZulu-Natal. Pietermaritzburg: University of KwaZulu-Natal Press. ISBN 978-1-8691-4025-0.
- Hill, Alan (2000). Hedley Verity: Portrait of a Cricketer. Edinburgh: Mainstream Publishing. ISBN 978-1-7805-7420-2 – via Internet Archive.
- Martin-Jenkins, Christopher (1980). The Complete Who's Who of Test Cricketers. London: Orbis Publishing. ISBN 978-0-7270-1262-3 – via Internet Archive.
- Merret, Christopher (2004). "Sport and Race in Colonial Natal: C.B. Llewellyn, South Africa's First Black Test Cricketer" (PDF). The Cricket Statistician (128). Nottingham: ACS.
- Pardon, Sydney H., ed. (1904). Wisden Cricketers' Almanack (41 ed.). London: John Wisden & Co. OCLC 867862787.
- Pearson, Harry (2017). Connie: The Marvellous Life of Learie Constantine. London: Little, Brown Book Group. ISBN 978-1-4087-0571-1 – via Internet Archive.
- Wigmore, Tim (2025). Test Cricket: A History. London: Quercus Publishing. ISBN 978-1-5294-2864-3.
- Wild, Roland (1934). The Biography Of Ranjitsinhji. London: Rich & Cowan. OCLC 154259876 – via Internet Archive.
- Wilde, Simon (2013). Wisden Cricketers of the Year: A Celebration of Cricket's Greatest Players. London: John Wisden & Co. ISBN 978-1-4081-4084-0.
