= List of South Africa Test cricketers =

This is a list of South African Test cricketers. The list is arranged in the order in which each player won his Test Cap.

International Test teams wear their cap number on their uniform under the national crest. For South African players, current cap numbers worn on their uniform start from their readmission to Test cricket in 1992 following their cricket boycott during the apartheid era.

The table in post readmission includes sequential cap numbers from South Africa's first Test played in 1889, as well as cap numbers worn on uniforms' since South Africa's readmission.

Statistics are correct as of 19 November 2026.

== Players from 1889 to 1970 ==
This table includes Players that made their debut from South Africa's first Test Match in 1889 to 1970.

Note: Players during this period were awarded their test caps in alphabetical order if more than one player debuted in the same match.

‡ Captain † Wicketkeeper

South African Test cricketers					Batting					Bowling						Fielding	
Cap	Name	First Test	Last Test	Mat	Inn	NO	Runs	HS	Avg	Balls	Mdn	Runs	Wkt	Best	Avg	Ca	St
1	Owen Dunell ‡	1889	1889	2	4	1	42	26*	14.00	-	-	-	-	-	-	1	-
2	Charlie Finlason	1889	1889	1	2	0	6	6	3.00	12	0	7	0	-	-	0	-
3	Philip Hutchinson	1889	1889	2	4	0	14	11	3.50	-	-	-	-	-	-	3	-
4	Gus Kempis	1889	1889	1	2	1	0	0*	0.00	168	17	76	4	3/53	19.00	0	-
5	William Milton ‡	1889	1892	3	6	0	68	21	11.33	79	5	48	2	1/5	24.00	1	-
6	Arthur Edward Ochse	1889	1889	2	4	0	16	8	4.00	-	-	-	-	-	-	0	-
7	Albert Rose-Innes	1889	1889	2	4	0	14	13	3.50	128	8	89	5	5/43	17.80	2	-
8	Fred Smith †	1889	1896	3	6	1	45	12	9.00	-	-	-	-	-	-	2	0
9	Robert Stewart	1889	1889	1	2	0	13	9	6.50	-	-	-	-	-	-	2	-
10	Bernard Tancred	1889	1889	2	4	1	87	29	29.00	-	-	-	-	-	-	2	-
11	Charles Vintcent	1889	1892	3	6	0	26	9	4.33	369	23	193	4	3/88	48.25	1	-
12	Gobo Ashley	1889	1889	1	2	0	1	1	0.50	173	18	95	7	7/95	13.57	0	-
13	William Richards	1889	1889	1	2	0	4	4	2.00	-	-	-	-	-	-	0	-
14	Nicolaas Theunissen	1889	1889	1	2	1	2	2*	2.00	80	5	51	0	-	-	0	-
15	Godfrey Cripps	1892	1892	1	2	0	21	18	10.50	15	0	23	0	-	-	0	-
16	Flooi du Toit	1892	1892	1	2	2	2	2*	-	85	5	47	1	1/47	47.00	1	-
17	Charles Fichardt	1892	1896	2	4	0	15	10	3.75	-	-	-	-	-	-	2	-
18	Ernest Halliwell ‡†	1892	1902	8	15	0	188	57	12.53	-	-	-	-	-	-	9	2
19	Frank Hearne	1892	1896	4 (Note: Frank Hearne and Frank Mitchell also played Test cricket for England. Only their records for South Africa are given here.)	8	0	121	30	15.13	62	0	40	2	2/40	20.00	3	-
20	Charles Mills	1892	1892	1	2	0	25	21	12.50	140	7	83	2	2/83	41.50	2	-
21	Dante Parkin	1892	1892	1	2	0	6	6	3.00	130	4	82	3	3/82	27.33	1	-
22	Thomas Routledge	1892	1896	4	8	0	72	24	9.00	-	-	-	-	-	-	2	-
23	Clarence Wimble	1892	1892	1	2	0	0	0	0.00	-	-	-	-	-	-	0	-
24	Frederick Cook	1896	1896	1	2	0	7	7	3.50	-	-	-	-	-	-	0	-
25	Robert Gleeson	1896	1896	1	2	1	4	3	4.00	-	-	-	-	-	-	2	-
26	Charles Hime	1896	1896	1	2	0	8	8	4.00	55	4	31	1	1/20	31.00	0	-
27	James Middleton	1896	1902	6	12	5	52	22	7.43	1,064	61	442	24	5/51	18.42	1	-
28	Robert Poore	1896	1896	3	6	0	76	20	12.67	9	0	4	1	1/4	4.00	3	-
29	Jimmy Sinclair	1896	1911	25	47	1	1,069	106	23.24	3,598	110	1,996	63	6/26	31.68	9	-
30	Joseph Willoughby	1896	1896	2	4	0	8	5	2.00	275	12	159	6	2/37	26.50	0	-
31	William Frank	1896	1896	1	2	0	7	5	3.50	58	3	52	1	1/52	52.00	0	-
32	Clement Johnson	1896	1896	1	2	0	10	7	5.00	140	12	57	0	-	-	1	-
33	Charlie Llewellyn	1896	1912	15	28	1	544	90	20.15	2,292	55	1,421	48	6/92	29.60	7	-
34	George Rowe	1896	1902	5	9	3	26	13*	4.33	998	50	456	15	5/115	30.40	4	-
35	George Shepstone	1896	1899	2	4	0	38	21	9.50	115	9	47	0	-	-	2	-
36	George Glover	1896	1896	1	2	1	21	18*	21.00	65	4	28	1	1/28	28.00	0	-
37	Alfred Richards ‡	1896	1896	1	2	0	6	6	3.00	-	-	-	-	-	-	0	-
38	Arthur Seccull	1896	1896	1	2	1	23	17*	23.00	60	2	37	2	2/37	18.50	1	-
39	Murray Bisset ‡†	1899	1910	3	6	2	103	35	25.75	-	-	-	-	-	-	2	1
40	Robert Dower	1899	1899	1	2	0	9	9	4.50	-	-	-	-	-	-	2	-
41	Howard Francis	1899	1899	2	4	0	39	29	9.75	-	-	-	-	-	-	1	-
42	Robert Graham	1899	1899	2	4	0	6	4	1.50	240	13	127	3	2/22	42.33	2	-
43	William Solomon	1899	1899	1	2	0	4	2	2.00	-	-	-	-	-	-	1	-
44	Vincent Tancred	1899	1899	1	2	0	25	18	12.50	-	-	-	-	-	-	0	-
45	Frederick Kuys	1899	1899	1	2	0	26	26	13.00	60	4	31	2	2/31	15.50	0	-
46	Albert Powell	1899	1899	1	2	0	16	11	8.00	20	1	10	1	1/10	10.00	2	-
47	Charles Prince	1899	1899	1	2	0	6	5	3.00	-	-	-	-	-	-	0	-
48	William Shalders	1899	1907	12	23	1	355	42	16.14	48	3	6	1	1/6	6.00	3	-
49	Maitland Hathorn	1902	1911	12	20	1	325	102	17.11	-	-	-	-	-	-	5	-
50	Dave Nourse	1902	1924	45	83	8	2,234	111	29.79	3,234	120	1,553	41	4/25	37.88	43	-
51	Charlie Smith	1902	1902	3	6	1	106	45	21.20	-	-	-	-	-	-	2	-
52	Henry Taberer ‡	1902	1902	1	1	0	2	2	2.00	60	2	48	1	1/25	48.00	0	-
53	Louis Tancred ‡	1902	1913	14	26	1	530	97	21.20	-	-	-	-	-	-	3	-
54	George Thornton	1902	1902	1	1	1	1	1*	-	24	0	20	1	1/20	20.00	1	-
55	Biddy Anderson ‡	1902	1902	1	2	0	43	32	21.50	-	-	-	-	-	-	1	-
56	Johannes Kotze	1902	1907	3	5	0	2	2	0.40	413	8	243	6	3/64	40.50	3	-
57	Percy Twentyman-Jones	1902	1902	1	2	0	0	0	0.00	-	-	-	-	-	-	0	-
58	Aubrey Faulkner	1906	1924	25	47	4	1,754	204	40.79	4,227	124	2,180	82	7/84	26.59	20	-
59	Reggie Schwarz	1906	1912	20	35	8	374	61	13.85	2,639	66	1,417	55	6/47	25.76	18	-
60	Percy Sherwell ‡†	1906	1911	13	22	4	427	115	23.72	-	-	-	-	-	-	20	16
61	Tip Snooke ‡	1906	1923	26	46	1	1,008	103	22.40	1,620	62	702	35	8/70	20.06	24	-
62	Bert Vogler	1906	1911	15	26	6	340	65	17.00	2,764	96	1,455	64	7/94	22.73	20	-
63	Gordon White	1906	1912	17	31	2	872	147	30.07	498	14	301	9	4/47	33.44	10	-
64	Stanley Snooke	1907	1907	1	1	0	0	0	0.00	-	-	-	-	-	-	2	-
65	Tom Campbell †	1910	1912	5	9	3	90	48	15.00	-	-	-	-	-	-	7	1
66	Mick Commaille	1910	1928	12	22	1	355	47	16.90	-	-	-	-	-	-	1	-
67	Louis Stricker	1910	1912	13	24	0	342	48	14.25	174	3	105	1	1/36	105.00	3	-
68	Billy Zulch	1910	1921	16	32	2	985	150	32.83	24	0	28	0	-	-	4	-
69	Claude Floquet	1910	1910	1	2	1	12	11*	12.00	48	2	24	0	-	-	0	-
70	Sid Pegler	1910	1924	16	28	5	356	35*	15.48	2,989	84	1,572	47	7/65	33.45	5	-
71	Norman Norton	1910	1910	1	2	0	9	7	4.50	90	4	47	4	4/47	11.75	0	-
72	Sivert Samuelson	1910	1910	1	2	0	22	15	11.00	108	2	64	0	-	-	1	-
73	Ormerod Pearse	1910	1911	3	6	0	55	31	9.17	144	0	106	3	3/56	35.33	1	-
74	Rolland Beaumont	1912	1914	5	9	0	70	31	7.78	6	1	0	0	-	-	2	-
75	Gerald Hartigan	1912	1914	5	10	0	114	51	11.40	252	7	141	1	1/72	141.00	0	-
76	Frank Mitchell ‡	1912	1912	3	6	0	28	12	4.67	-	-	-	-	-	-	2	-
77	Herbie Taylor ‡	1912	1932	42	76	4	2,936	176	40.78	342	18	156	5	3/15	31.20	19	-
78	Tommy Ward †	1912	1924	23	42	9	459	64	13.91	-	-	-	-	-	-	19	13
79	Claude Carter	1912	1924	10	15	5	181	45	18.10	1,475	47	694	28	6/50	24.79	2	-
80	Harold Baumgartner	1913	1913	1	2	0	19	16	9.50	166	3	99	2	2/99	49.50	1	-
81	Jimmy Blanckenberg	1913	1924	18	30	7	455	59	19.78	3,888	132	1,817	60	6/76	30.28	9	-
82	Alfred Cooper	1913	1913	1	2	0	6	6	3.00	-	-	-	-	-	-	1	-
83	Joseph Cox	1913	1914	3	6	1	17	12*	3.40	576	24	245	4	2/74	61.25	1	-
84	Philip Hands	1913	1924	7	12	0	300	83	25.00	37	0	18	0	-	-	3	-
85	Plum Lewis	1913	1913	1	2	0	0	0	0.00	-	-	-	-	-	-	0	-
86	George Tapscott	1913	1913	1	2	0	5	4	2.50	-	-	-	-	-	-	1	-
87	Claude Newberry	1913	1914	4	8	0	62	16	7.75	558	15	268	11	4/72	24.36	3	-
88	Cecil Dixon	1914	1914	1	2	0	0	0	0.00	240	6	118	3	2/62	39.33	1	-
89	Len Tuckett	1914	1914	1	2	1	0	0*	0.00	120	4	69	0	-	-	2	-
90	Horace Chapman	1914	1921	2	4	1	39	17	13.00	126	1	104	1	1/51	104.00	1	-
91	Fred le Roux	1914	1914	1	2	0	1	1	0.50	54	3	24	0	-	-	0	-
92	Dan Taylor	1914	1914	2	4	0	85	36	21.25	-	-	-	-	-	-	0	-
93	Reginald Hands	1914	1914	1	2	0	7	7	3.50	-	-	-	-	-	-	0	-
94	Bill Lundie	1914	1914	1	2	1	1	1	1.00	286	9	107	4	4/101	26.75	0	-
95	Charlie Frank	1921	1921	3	6	0	236	152	39.33	-	-	-	-	-	-	0	-
96	William Ling	1921	1923	6	10	0	168	38	16.80	18	0	20	0	-	-	1	-
97	Eric Marx	1921	1921	3	6	0	125	36	20.83	228	1	144	4	3/85	36.00	0	-
98	Buster Nupen ‡	1921	1936	17	31	7	348	69	14.50	4,159	133	1,788	50	6/46	35.76	9	-
99	Neville Lindsay	1921	1921	1	2	0	35	29	17.50	-	-	-	-	-	-	1	-
100	Norman Reid	1921	1921	1	2	0	17	11	8.50	126	3	63	2	2/63	31.50	0	-
101	William Brann	1922	1923	3	5	0	71	50	14.20	-	-	-	-	-	-	2	-
102	Izak Buys	1922	1922	1	2	1	4	4*	4.00	144	4	52	0	-	-	0	-
103	Bob Catterall	1922	1931	24	43	2	1,555	120	37.93	342	7	162	7	3/15	23.14	12	-
104	Cyril Francois	1922	1923	5	9	1	252	72	31.50	684	36	225	6	3/23	37.50	5	-
105	George Hearne	1922	1924	3	5	0	59	28	11.80	-	-	-	-	-	-	3	-
106	Alfred Hall	1923	1931	7	8	2	11	5	1.83	2,361	107	886	40	7/63	22.15	4	-
107	Doug Meintjes	1923	1923	2	3	0	43	21	14.33	246	7	115	6	3/38	19.17	3	-
108	Lionel Tapscott	1923	1923	2	3	1	58	50*	29.00	12	1	2	0	-	-	0	-
109	Dalton Conyngham	1923	1923	1	2	2	6	3*	-	366	22	103	2	1/40	51.50	1	-
110	Nummy Deane ‡	1924	1931	17	27	2	628	93	25.12	-	-	-	-	-	-	8	-
111	George Parker	1924	1924	2	4	2	3	2*	1.50	366	2	273	8	6/152	34.13	0	-
112	Manfred Susskind	1924	1924	5	8	0	268	65	33.50	-	-	-	-	-	-	1	-
113	Jock Cameron ‡†	1927	1935	26	45	4	1,239	90	30.22	-	-	-	-	-	-	39	12
114	Shunter Coen	1927	1928	2	4	2	101	41*	50.50	12	0	7	0	-	-	1	-
115	Jacobus Duminy	1927	1929	3	6	0	30	12	5.00	60	0	39	1	1/17	39.00	2	-
116	Denys Morkel	1927	1932	16	28	1	663	88	24.56	1,704	55	821	18	4/93	45.61	13	-
117	Henry Promnitz	1927	1928	2	4	0	14	5	3.50	528	30	161	8	5/58	20.13	2	-
118	Cyril Vincent	1927	1935	25	38	12	526	60	20.23	5,851	194	2,631	84	6/51	31.32	27	-
119	George Bissett	1928	1928	4	4	2	38	23	19.00	989	28	469	25	7/29	18.76	0	-
120	Archibald Palm	1928	1928	1	2	0	15	13	7.50	-	-	-	-	-	-	1	-
121	John Nicolson	1928	1928	3	5	0	179	78	35.80	24	0	17	0	-	-	0	-
122	Arthur Lennox Ochse	1928	1929	3	4	1	11	4*	3.67	649	10	362	10	4/79	36.20	1	-
123	Jack Siedle	1928	1936	18	34	0	977	141	28.74	19	1	7	1	1/7	7.00	7	-
124	Jim Christy	1929	1932	10	18	0	618	103	34.33	138	4	92	2	1/15	46.00	3	-
125	Bruce Mitchell	1929	1949	42	80	9	3,471	189*	48.89	2,519	26	1,380	27	5/87	51.11	56	-
126	Tuppy Owen-Smith	1929	1929	5	8	2	252	129	42.00	156	0	113	0	-	-	4	-
127	Neville Quinn	1929	1932	12	18	3	90	28	6.00	2,922	103	1,145	35	6/92	32.71	1	-
128	Sandy Bell	1929	1935	16	23	12	69	26*	6.27	3,342	89	1,567	48	6/99	32.65	6	-
129	Eric Dalton	1929	1939	15	24	2	698	117	31.73	864	7	490	12	4/59	40.83	5	-
130	Quintin McMillan	1929	1932	13	21	4	306	50*	18.00	2,021	38	1,243	36	5/66	34.53	8	-
131	Edward van der Merwe †	1929	1936	2	4	1	27	19	9.00	-	-	-	-	-	-	3	0
132	Xen Balaskas	1930	1939	9	13	1	174	122*	14.50	1,572	28	806	22	5/49	36.64	5	-
133	Syd Curnow	1930	1932	7	14	0	168	47	12.00	-	-	-	-	-	-	5	-
134	Bob Newson	1930	1939	3	5	1	30	16	7.50	874	15	265	4	2/58	66.25	3	-
135	Ken Viljoen	1930	1949	27	50	2	1,365	124	28.44	48	1	23	0	-	-	5	-
136	John Cochran	1931	1931	1	1	0	4	4	4.00	138	5	47	0	-	-	0	-
137	Lennox Brown	1931	1932	2	3	0	17	8	5.67	318	7	189	3	1/30	63.00	0	-
138	Bob Crisp	1935	1936	9	13	1	123	35	10.25	1,428	30	747	20	5/99	37.35	3	-
139	Arthur Langton	1935	1939	15	23	4	298	73*	15.68	4,199	104	1,827	40	5/58	45.68	8	-
140	Dudley Nourse ‡	1935	1951	34	62	7	2,960	231	53.82	20	1	9	0	-	-	12	-
141	Eric Rowan	1935	1951	26	50	5	1,965	236	43.67	19	1	7	0	-	-	14	-
142	Denis Tomlinson	1935	1935	1	1	0	9	9	9.00	60	0	38	0	-	-	0	-
143	Herby Wade ‡	1935	1936	10	18	2	327	40*	20.44	-	-	-	-	-	-	4	-
144	Frank Nicholson †	1935	1936	4	8	1	76	29	10.86	-	-	-	-	-	-	3	0
145	Jack Robertson	1935	1936	3	6	1	51	17	10.20	738	26	321	6	3/143	53.50	2	-
146	Ernest Bock	1935	1935	1	2	2	11	9*	-	138	2	91	0	-	-	0	-
147	Dooley Briscoe	1935	1939	2	3	0	33	16	11.00	-	-	-	-	-	-	1	-
148	Eric Davies	1936	1939	5	8	3	9	3	1.80	768	7	481	7	4/75	68.71	0	-
149	Robert Harvey	1936	1936	2	4	0	51	28	12.75	-	-	-	-	-	-	0	-
150	Gerald Bond	1938	1938	1	1	0	0	0	0.00	16	0	16	0	-	-	0	-
151	Norman Gordon	1938	1939	5	6	2	8	7*	2.00	1,966	28	807	20	5/103	40.35	1	-
152	Alan Melville ‡	1938	1949	11	19	2	894	189	52.59	-	-	-	-	-	-	8	-
153	Pieter van der Bijl	1938	1939	5	9	0	460	125	51.11	-	-	-	-	-	-	1	-
154	Billy Wade †	1938	1950	11	19	1	511	125	28.39	-	-	-	-	-	-	15	2
155	Ronnie Grieveson †	1939	1939	2	2	0	114	75	57.00	-	-	-	-	-	-	7	3
156	Ossie Dawson	1947	1949	9	15	1	293	55	20.93	1,294	41	578	10	2/57	57.80	10	-
157	Tony Harris	1947	1949	3	5	1	100	60	25.00	-	-	-	-	-	-	1	-
158	Johnny Lindsay †	1947	1947	3	5	2	21	9*	7.00	-	-	-	-	-	-	4	1
159	Tufty Mann	1947	1951	19	31	1	400	52	13.33	5,796	260	1,920	58	6/59	33.10	3	-
160	Athol Rowan	1947	1951	15	23	6	290	41	17.06	5,193	136	2,084	54	5/68	38.59	7	-
161	Ian Smith	1947	1957	9	16	6	39	11*	3.90	1,655	55	769	12	4/143	64.08	3	-
162	Lindsay Tuckett	1947	1949	9	14	3	131	40*	11.91	2,104	47	980	19	5/68	51.58	9	-
163	Dennis Dyer	1947	1947	3	6	0	96	62	16.00	-	-	-	-	-	-	0	-
164	Jack Plimsoll	1947	1947	1	2	1	16	8*	16.00	237	9	143	3	3/128	47.67	0	-
165	George Fullerton †	1947	1951	7	13	0	325	88	25.00	-	-	-	-	-	-	10	2
166	Denis Begbie	1948	1950	5	7	0	138	48	19.71	160	0	130	1	1/38	130.00	2	-
167	Cuan McCarthy	1948	1951	15	24	15	28	5	3.11	3,499	64	1,510	36	6/43	41.94	6	-
168	Owen Wynne	1948	1950	6	12	0	219	50	18.25	-	-	-	-	-	-	3	-
169	Martin Hanley	1949	1949	1	1	0	0	0	0.00	232	7	88	1	1/57	88.00	0	-
170	Fish Markham	1949	1949	1	1	0	20	20	20.00	104	1	72	1	1/34	72.00	0	-
171	Jack Cheetham	1949	1955	24	43	6	883	89	23.86	6	0	2	0	-	-	13	-
172	Jack Nel	1949	1957	6	11	0	150	38	13.64	-	-	-	-	-	-	1	-
173	Hugh Tayfield	1949	1960	37	60	9	862	75	16.90	13,568	602	4,405	170	9/113	25.91	26	-
174	John Watkins	1949	1957	15	27	1	612	92	23.54	2,805	134	816	29	4/22	28.14	12	-
175	Ronald Draper	1950	1950	2	3	0	25	15	8.33	-	-	-	-	-	-	0	-
176	Michael Melle	1950	1953	7	12	4	68	17	8.50	1,667	20	851	26	6/71	32.73	4	-
177	Paul Winslow	1950	1955	5	9	0	186	108	20.67	-	-	-	-	-	-	1	-
178	Geoff Chubb	1951	1951	5	9	3	63	15*	10.50	1,425	63	577	21	6/51	27.48	0	-
179	Jackie McGlew ‡	1951	1962	34	64	6	2,440	255*	42.07	32	0	23	0	-	-	18	-
180	Clive van Ryneveld ‡	1951	1958	19	33	6	724	83	26.81	1,554	27	671	17	4/67	39.47	14	-
181	John Waite†	1951	1965	50	86	7	2,405	134	30.44	-	-	-	-	-	-	124	17
182	Roy McLean	1951	1964	40	73	3	2,120	142	30.29	4	0	1	0	-	-	23	-
183	Percy Mansell	1951	1955	13	22	2	355	90	17.75	1,506	31	736	11	3/58	66.91	15	-
184	Russell Endean †	1951	1958	28	52	4	1,630	162*	33.96	-	-	-	-	-	-	41	0
185	Ken Funston	1952	1958	18	33	1	824	92	25.75	-	-	-	-	-	-	7	-
186	Anton Murray	1952	1954	10	14	1	289	109	22.23	2,374	111	710	18	4/169	39.44	3	-
187	Eddie Fuller	1953	1958	7	9	1	64	17	8.00	1,898	61	668	22	5/66	30.36	3	-
188	Headley Keith	1953	1957	8	16	1	318	73	21.20	108	2	63	0	-	-	9	-
189	Neil Adcock	1953	1962	26	39	12	146	24	5.41	6,391	218	2,195	104	6/43	21.11	4	-
190	David Ironside	1953	1954	3	4	2	37	13	18.50	986	41	275	15	5/51	18.33	1	-
191	Dick Westcott	1954	1958	5	9	0	166	62	18.44	32	0	22	0	-	-	0	-
192	Trevor Goddard ‡	1955	1970	41	78	5	2,516	112	34.47	11,736	706	3,226	123	6/53	26.23	48	-
193	Peter Heine	1955	1962	14	24	3	209	31	9.95	3,890	106	1455	58	6/58	25.09	8	-
194	Scotch Taylor	1956	1956	1	2	0	18	12	9.00	-	-	-	-	-	-	0	-
195	Tony Pithey	1957	1965	17	27	1	819	154	31.50	12	0	5	0	-	-	3	-
196	Chris Duckworth	1957	1957	2	4	0	28	13	7.00	-	-	-	-	-	-	3	-
197	Christopher Burger	1958	1958	2	4	1	62	37*	20.67	-	-	-	-	-	-	1	-
198	Peter Carlstein	1958	1964	8	14	1	190	42	14.62	-	-	-	-	-	-	3	-
199	Jonathan Fellows-Smith	1960	1960	4	8	2	166	35	27.67	114	1	61	0	-	-	2	-
200	Geoff Griffin	1960	1960	2	4	0	25	14	6.25	432	14	192	8	4/87	24.00	0	-
201	Sid O'Linn	1960	1961	7	12	1	297	98	27.00	-	-	-	-	-	-	4	-
202	Colin Wesley	1960	1960	3	5	0	49	35	9.80	-	-	-	-	-	-	1	-
203	Jim Pothecary	1960	1960	3	4	0	26	12	6.50	828	32	354	9	4/58	39.33	2	-
204	Atholl McKinnon	1960	1967	8	13	7	107	27	17.83	2,546	153	925	26	4/128	35.58	1	-
205	Eddie Barlow	1961	1970	30	57	2	2,516	201	45.75	3,021	115	1,362	40	5/85	34.05	35	-
206	Colin Bland	1961	1966	21	39	5	1,669	144*	49.09	394	18	125	2	2/16	62.50	10	-
207	Harry Bromfield	1961	1965	9	12	7	59	21	11.80	1,810	101	599	17	5/88	35.24	13	-
208	Kim Elgie	1961	1962	3	6	0	75	56	12.50	66	2	46	0	-	-	4	-
209	Godfrey Lawrence	1961	1962	5	8	0	141	43	17.63	1,334	62	512	28	8/53	18.29	2	-
210	Peter Pollock	1961	1970	28	41	13	607	75*	21.68	6,522	270	2,806	116	6/38	24.19	9	-
211	Kenneth Walter	1961	1961	2	3	0	11	10	3.67	495	20	197	6	4/63	32.83	3	-
212	Sydney Burke	1962	1965	2	4	1	42	20	14.00	660	37	257	11	6/128	23.36	0	-
213	Buster Farrer	1962	1964	6	10	2	221	40	27.63	-	-	-	-	-	-	2	-
214	Tiger Lance	1962	1970	13	22	1	591	70	28.14	948	38	479	12	3/30	39.92	7	-
215	Denis Lindsay †	1963	1970	19	31	1	1,130	182	37.67	-	-	-	-	-	-	57	2
216	Joe Partridge	1963	1965	11	12	5	73	13*	10.43	3,684	136	1,373	44	7/91	31.20	6	-
217	David Pithey	1963	1967	8	12	1	138	55	12.55	1,424	67	577	12	6/58	48.08	6	-
218	Graeme Pollock	1963	1970	23	41	4	2,256	274	60.97	414	17	204	4	2/50	51.00	17	-
219	Kelly Seymour	1963	1970	7	10	3	84	36	12.00	1,458	36	588	9	3/80	65.33	2	-
220	Peter van der Merwe ‡	1963	1967	15	23	2	533	76	25.38	79	7	22	1	1/6	22.00	11	-
221	Clive Halse	1964	1964	3	3	3	30	19*	-	587	7	260	6	3/50	43.33	1	-
222	Derek Varnals	1964	1965	3	6	0	97	23	16.17	12	1	2	0	-	-	0	-
223	Glen Hall	1965	1965	1	1	0	0	0	0.00	186	7	94	1	1/94	94.00	0	-
224	Mike Macaulay	1965	1965	1	2	0	33	21	16.50	276	17	73	2	1/10	36.50	0	-
225	Ali Bacher ‡	1965	1970	12	22	1	679	73	32.33	-	-	-	-	-	-	10	-
226	Jackie Botten	1965	1965	3	6	0	65	33	10.83	828	37	337	8	2/56	42.13	1	-
227	Richard Dumbrill	1965	1967	5	10	0	153	36	15.30	816	40	336	9	4/30	37.33	3	-
228	Mike Procter	1967	1970	7	10	1	226	48	25.11	1,514	80	616	41	6/73	15.02	4	-
229	Pat Trimborn	1967	1970	4	4	2	13	11*	6.50	747	31	257	11	3/12	23.36	7	-
230	Jackie du Preez	1967	1967	2	2	0	0	0	0.00	144	12	51	3	2/22	17.00	2	-
231	Grahame Chevalier	1970	1970	1	2	1	0	0*	0.00	253	11	100	5	3/68	20.00	1	-
232	Dennis Gamsy †	1970	1970	2	3	1	39	30*	19.50	-	-	-	-	-	-	5	0
233	Lee Irvine	1970	1970	4	7	0	353	102	50.43	-	-	-	-	-	-	2	-
234	Barry Richards	1970	1970	4	7	0	508	140	72.57	72	3	26	1	1/12	26.00	3	-
235	John Traicos	1970	1970	3 (Note: John Traicos also played Test cricket for Zimbabwe. Only his record for South Africa is given here.)	4	2	8	5*	4.00	470	24	207	4	2/70	51.75	4	-

== Players Since Readmission - 1992 to Present ==
South Africa did not Play International Test Cricket from 1970 to 1992 due to International Isolation. The Table below lists all the Players that have made their debut for South Africa since readmission to Test Cricket in 1992.

This Table includes the sequential cap numbers and cap numbers since Readmission.

Note: Players awarded their test cap post readmission is not based on alphabetical order if more than one player debuted in the same match.

‡ Captain † Wicketkeeper

South African Test cricketers						Batting					Bowling						Fielding	
Cap	Post- 1992 Cap	Name	First Test	Last Test	Mat	Inn	NO	Runs	HS	Avg	Balls	Mdn	Runs	Wkt	Best	Avg	Ca	St
236	11	Tertius Bosch	1992	1992	1	2	2	5	5*	-	237	9	104	3	2/61	34.67	0	-
237	5	Hansie Cronje ‡	1992	2000	68	111	9	3,714	135	36.41	3,800	243	1,288	43	3/14	29.95	33	-
238	10	Allan Donald	1992	2002	72	94	33	652	37	10.69	15,519	661	7,344	330	8/71	22.25	18	-
239	3	Andrew Hudson	1992	1998	35	63	3	2,007	163	33.45	-	-	-	-	-	-	36	-
240	4	Peter Kirsten	1992	1994	12	22	2	626	104	31.30	54	1	30	0	-	-	8	-
241	6	Adrian Kuiper	1992	1992	1	2	0	34	34	17.00	-	-	-	-	-	-	1	-
242	9	Meyrick Pringle	1992	1995	4	6	2	67	33	16.75	652	21	270	5	2/62	54.00	0	-
243	7	Dave Richardson †	1992	1998	42	64	8	1,359	109	24.27	-	-	-	-	-	-	150	2
244	2	Mark Rushmere	1992	1992	1	2	0	6	3	3.00	-	-	-	-	-	-	0	-
245	8	Richard Snell	1992	1994	5	8	1	95	48	13.57	1,025	42	538	19	4/74	28.32	1	-
246	1	Kepler Wessels ‡	1992	1994	16 (Note: Kepler Wessels also played Test cricket for Australia. Only his record for South Africa is given here.)	29	2	1,027	118	38.03	-	-	-	-	-	-	12	-
247	12	Jimmy Cook	1992	1993	3	6	0	107	43	17.83	-	-	-	-	-	-	0	-
248	15	Omar Henry	1992	1993	3	3	0	53	34	17.67	427	14	189	3	2/56	63.00	2	-
249	14	Brian McMillan	1992	1998	38	62	12	1,968	113	39.36	6,048	255	2,537	75	4/65	33.83	49	-
250	13	Jonty Rhodes	1992	2000	52	80	9	2,532	117	35.66	12	1	5	0	-	-	34	-
251	16	Brett Schultz	1992	1997	9	8	2	9	6	1.50	1,733	82	749	37	5/48	20.24	2	-
252	17	Craig Matthews	1992	1995	18	25	6	348	62*	18.32	3,980	231	1,502	52	5/42	28.88	4	-
253	18	Daryll Cullinan	1993	2001	70	115	12	4,554	275*	44.21	120	3	71	2	1/10	35.50	67	-
254	19	Clive Eksteen	1993	2000	7	11	2	91	22	10.11	1,536	97	494	8	3/12	61.75	5	-
255	20	Pat Symcox	1993	1998	20	27	1	741	108	28.50	3,561	135	1,603	37	4/69	43.32	5	-
256	22	Fanie de Villiers	1993	1998	18	26	7	359	67*	18.89	4,805	221	2,063	85	6/23	24.27	11	-
257	21	Gary Kirsten ‡	1993	2004	101	176	15	7,289	275	45.27	349	19	142	2	1/0	71.00	83	-
258	23	John Commins	1994	1995	3	6	1	125	45	25.00	-	-	-	-	-	-	2	-
259	24	Steven Jack	1994	1995	2	2	0	7	7	3.50	462	24	196	8	4/69	24.50	1	-
260	25	Rudi Steyn	1995	1995	3	6	0	127	46	21.17	-	-	-	-	-	-	0	-
261	26	Shaun Pollock ‡	1995	2008	108	156	39	3,781	111	32.31	24,353	1,222	9,733	421	7/87	23.11	72	-
262	27	Jacques Kallis ‡	1995	2013	165 (Note: Jacques Kallis, Mark Boucher and Graeme Smith have all played for the ICC World XI. Only their records for South Africa are given here.)	278	39	13,206	224	55.25	20,172	846	9,535	291	6/54	32.63	196	-
263	28	Paul Adams	1995	2004	45	55	15	360	35	9.00	8,850	339	4,405	134	7/128	32.87	29	-
264	29	Herschelle Gibbs	1996	2008	90	154	7	6,167	228	41.95	6	0	4	0	-	-	94	-
265	30	Lance Klusener	1996	2004	49	69	11	1,906	174	32.86	6,887	318	3,033	80	8/64	37.91	34	-
266	31	Adam Bacher	1996	1999	19	33	1	833	96	26.03	6	0	4	0	-	-	11	-
267	32	Mark Boucher ‡†	1997	2012	146	204	24	5,498	125	30.54	8	0	6	1	1/6	6.00	532	23
268	33	HD Ackerman	1998	1998	4	8	0	161	57	20.13	-	-	-	-	-	-	1	-
269	34	Makhaya Ntini	1998	2009	101	116	45	699	32*	9.84	20,834	759	11,242	390	7/37	28.82	25	-
270	35	Gerhardus Liebenberg	1998	1998	5	8	0	104	45	13.00	-	-	-	-	-	-	1	-
271	36	Steve Elworthy	1998	2002	4	5	1	72	48	18.00	867	35	444	13	4/66	34.15	1	-
272	37	David Terbrugge	1998	2004	7	8	5	16	4*	5.33	1,012	44	517	20	5/46	25.85	4	-
273	38	Boeta Dippenaar	1999	2007	38	62	5	1,718	177*	30.14	12	1	1	0	-	-	27	-
274	39	Nantie Hayward	1999	2004	16	17	8	66	14	7.33	2,821	90	1,609	54	5/56	29.80	4	-
275	40	Pieter Strydom	2000	2000	2	3	0	35	30	11.67	36	0	27	0	-	-	1	-
276	41	Nicky Boje	2000	2006	43	62	10	1,312	85	25.23	8,620	293	4,265	100	5/62	42.65	18	-
277	42	Neil McKenzie	2000	2009	58	94	7	3,253	226	37.39	90	0	68	0	-	-	54	-
278	43	Mfuneko Ngam	2000	2001	3	1	1	0	0*	-	392	15	189	11	3/26	17.18	1	-
279	44	Justin Kemp	2001	2005	4	6	0	80	55	13.33	479	20	222	9	3/33	24.67	3	-
280	45	Claude Henderson	2001	2002	7	7	0	65	30	9.29	1,962	79	928	22	4/116	42.18	2	-
281	46	André Nel	2001	2008	36	42	8	337	34	9.91	7,630	280	3,919	123	6/32	31.86	16	-
282	47	Justin Ontong	2002	2004	2	4	1	57	32	19.00	185	2	133	1	1/79	133.00	1	-
283	48	Ashwell Prince ‡	2002	2011	66	104	16	3,665	162*	41.64	96	1	47	1	1/2	47.00	47	-
284	50	Andrew Hall	2002	2007	21	33	4	760	163	26.20	3,001	95	1,617	45	3/1	35.93	16	-
285	51	Dewald Pretorius	2002	2003	4	4	1	22	9	7.33	570	18	430	6	4/115	71.67	0	-
286	49	Graeme Smith ‡	2002	2014	116	203	13	9,253	277	48.70	1,418	28	885	8	2/145	110.62	166	-
287	52	Martin van Jaarsveld	2002	2004	9	15	2	397	73	30.54	42	0	28	0	-	-	11	-
288	54	Alan Dawson	2003	2003	2	1	0	10	10	10.00	252	14	117	5	2/20	23.40	0	-
289	53	Jacques Rudolph	2003	2012	48	83	9	2,622	222*	35.43	664	13	432	4	1/1	108.00	29	-
290	55	Charl Willoughby	2003	2003	2	-	-	0	-	-	300	18	125	1	1/47	125.00	0	-
291	56	Robin Peterson	2003	2014	15	20	3	464	84	27.29	2,515	85	1,461	38	5/33	37.26	9	-
292	57	Monde Zondeki	2003	2008	5	4	0	82	59	20.50	692	21	438	16	6/39	27.38	1	-
293	58	Zander de Bruyn	2004	2004	3	5	1	155	83	38.75	216	8	92	3	2/32	30.67	0	-
294	59	Thami Tsolekile †	2004	2004	3	5	0	47	22	9.40	-	-	-	-	-	-	6	0
295	60	Hashim Amla ‡	2004	2019	124	215	16	9,282	311*	46.64	54	0	37	0	-	-	108	-
296	61	AB de Villiers ‡†	2004	2018	114	191	18	8,765	278*	50.66	204	6	104	2	2/49	52.00	222	5
297	62	Dale Steyn	2004	2019	93	119	27	1,251	76	13.59	18,608	660	10,077	439	7/51	22.95	26	-
298	63	Charl Langeveldt	2005	2006	6	4	2	16	10	8.00	999	27	593	16	5/46	37.06	2	-
299	64	Johan Botha	2006	2010	5	6	2	83	25	20.75	1,017	29	573	17	4/56	33.70	3	-
300	65	Morné Morkel	2006	2018	86	104	23	944	40	11.65	16,498	605	8,550	309	6/23	27.66	25	-
301	66	Paul Harris	2007	2011	37	48	5	460	46	10.69	8,809	336	3,901	103	6/127	37.87	16	-
302	67	JP Duminy	2008	2017	46	74	10	2,103	166	32.85	2,703	48	1,601	42	4/47	38.11	38	-
303	68	Imraan Khan	2009	2009	1	1	0	20	20	20.00	-	-	-	-	-	-	0	-
304	69	Albie Morkel	2009	2009	1	1	0	58	58	58.00	192	0	132	1	1/44	132.00	0	-
305	70	Friedel de Wet	2009	2010	2	2	0	20	20	10.00	426	19	186	6	4/55	31.00	1	-
306	71	Ryan McLaren	2010	2014	2	2	1	41	33*	-	150	4	45	1	1/30	43.00	0	-
307	72	Wayne Parnell	2010	2017	6	4	0	67	23	16.75	556	11	414	15	4/51	27.60	3	-
308	73	Alviro Petersen	2010	2015	36	64	4	2,093	182	34.88	114	1	62	1	1/2	62.00	31	-
309	74	Lonwabo Tsotsobe	2010	2011	5	5	2	19	8*	6.33	870	35	448	9	3/43	49.77	1	-
310	76	Imran Tahir	2011	2015	20	23	9	130	29*	9.28	3,925	86	2,294	57	5/32	40.24	8	-
311	75	Vernon Philander	2011	2020	64	94	20	1,779	74	24.04	11,391	507	5,000	224	6/21	22.32	17	-
312	77	Marchant de Lange	2011	2012	2	2	0	9	9	4.50	448	10	277	9	7/81	30.77	1	-
313	78	Rory Kleinveldt	2012	2013	4	5	2	27	17*	9.00	667	21	422	10	3/65	42.20	2	-
314	79	Francois du Plessis ‡	2012	2021	69	118	14	4,163	199	40.02	78	0	69	0	-	-	63	-
315	80	Dean Elgar ‡	2012	2024	86	152	11	5,347	199	37.92	1,036	12	673	15	4/22	44.86	92	-
316	81	Kyle Abbott	2013	2017	11	14	0	95	17	6.78	2,081	95	886	39	7/29	22.71	4	-
317	82	Quinton de Kock ‡†	2014	2021	54	91	6	3,330	141*	38.82	-	-	-	-	-	-	221	11
318	83	Dane Piedt	2014	2024	12	17	3	214	56	15.28	2,427	57	1,521	37	5/89	41.10	5	-
319	84	Stiaan van Zyl	2014	2016	12	17	2	395	101*	26.33	403	14	148	6	3/20	24.66	6	-
320	85	Temba Bavuma ‡	2014	2026	70	120	15	4,096	179	39.00	96	1	61	1	1/29	61.00	34	-
321	86	Simon Harmer	2015	2026	18	26	6	392	82	19.60	4,241	135	2,049	89	6/16	23.02	13	-
322	87	Dane Vilas †	2015	2016	6	9	0	94	26	10.44	-	-	-	-	-	-	13	0
323	88	Kagiso Rabada	2015	2026	76	114	22	1,176	72	12.78	14,096	459	7,858	358	7/112	21.94	34	-
324	89	Chris Morris	2016	2017	4	7	0	173	69	24.71	623	15	459	12	3/38	38.25	5	-
325	90	Hardus Viljoen	2016	2016	1	2	1	26	20*	26.00	114	2	94	1	1/79	94.00	2	-
326	91	Stephen Cook	2016	2017	11	19	0	632	117	33.26	12	0	16	0	-	-	6	-
327	92	Keshav Maharaj ‡	2016	2026	63	97	9	1,369	84	15.55	12,482	377	6,501	220	9/129	29.55	24	-
328	93	Tabraiz Shamsi	2016	2018	2	4	3	20	18*	20.00	483	10	278	6	3/91	46.33	0	-
329	94	Duanne Olivier	2017	2024	16	21	10	66	15*	6.00	2,292	64	1,432	59	6/37	24.27	3	-
330	95	Theunis de Bruyn	2017	2022	13	25	1	468	101	19.50	102	1	74	0	-	-	12	-
331	96	Heino Kuhn	2017	2017	4	8	0	113	34	14.12	-	-	-	-	-	-	1	-
332	97	Aiden Markram ‡	2017	2026	54	99	3	3,406	152	35.47	759	15	367	6	2/27	61.16	78	-
333	98	Andile Phehlukwayo	2017	2018	4	4	2	19	9	9.50	250	9	147	11	3/13	13.36	2	-
334	99	Lungi Ngidi	2018	2025	20	31	11	97	19	4.85	2,578	100	1,356	58	6/39	23.37	7	-
335	100	Zubayr Hamza	2019	2026	9	18	1	390	83	22.94	-	-	-	-	-	-	7	-
336	101	Wiaan Mulder ‡	2019	2026	28	46	5	1,440	367*	35.12	2,649	104	1,287	48	4/32	26.81	35	-
337	102	Senuran Muthusamy	2019	2025	8	11	4	388	109	55.42	960	19	606	23	6/117	26.34	7	-
338	103	Anrich Nortje	2019	2026	21	35	9	207	40	7.96	3,318	87	2,019	75	6/56	26.92	6	-
339	104	Heinrich Klaasen †	2019	2023	4	8	0	104	35	13.00	-	-	-	-	-	-	10	2
340	105	George Linde	2019	2021	3	6	0	135	37	22.50	473	17	252	9	5/64	28.00	0	-
341	107	Dwaine Pretorius	2019	2020	3	6	0	83	37	13.83	480	17	252	7	2/26	36.00	2	-
342	106	Rassie van der Dussen	2019	2022	18	32	2	905	98	30.16	-	-	-	-	-	-	23	-
343	108	Pieter Malan	2020	2020	3	6	0	156	84	26.00	12	0	5	0	-	-	3	-
344	109	Dane Paterson	2020	2026	8	12	3	130	39*	14.44	1,519	52	766	29	5/61	26.41	2	-
345	110	Beuran Hendricks	2020	2020	1	2	1	9	5*	9.00	231	5	175	6	5/64	29.16	0	-
346	111	Lutho Sipamla	2020	2022	3	4	1	15	10*	5.00	419	14	245	11	4/76	22.27	2	-
347	112	Keegan Petersen	2021	2024	14	25	0	704	82	28.16	-	-	-	-	-	-	18	-
348	113	Kyle Verreynne †	2021	2026	32	50	6	1,280	136*	29.09	-	-	-	-	-	-	95	13
349	114	Marco Jansen	2021	2026	25	38	5	830	93	25.15	4,202	141	2,250	104	7/13	21.63	29	-
350	115	Sarel Erwee	2022	2023	10	19	1	479	108	26.61	-	-	-	-	-	-	8	-
351	116	Glenton Stuurman	2022	2022	2	2	0	11	11	5.50	174	5	124	1	1/124	124.00	0	-
352	117	Ryan Rickelton †	2022	2026	19	33	3	1,175	259	39.16	-	-	-	-	-	-	20	1
353	118	Lizaad Williams	2022	2022	2	3	0	25	13	8.33	185	5	105	3	3/54	35.00	4	-
354	119	Khaya Zondo	2022	2023	5	7	1	120	39	20.00	-	-	-	-	-	-	2	-
355	121	Gerald Coetzee	2023	2026	5	8	1	68	20	9.71	612	14	407	15	3/37	27.13	1	-
356	120	Tony de Zorzi	2023	2025	17	31	1	919	177	30.63	-	-	-	-	-	-	13	-
357	122	David Bedingham	2023	2026	18	31	3	984	110	35.14	-	-	-	-	-	-	17	-
358	123	Nandre Burger	2023	2024	3	5	1	33	23	8.25	376	14	237	14	4/33	16.92	1	-
359	124	Tristan Stubbs	2024	2026	15	28	2	792	122	30.46	-	-	-	-	-	-	15	-
360	125	Neil Brand ‡	2024	2024	2	4	0	66	34	16.50	234	2	171	8	6/119	21.37	3	-
361	127	Ruan de Swardt	2024	2024	2	4	1	99	64	33.00	270	10	121	3	2/61	40.33	3	-
362	130	Clyde Fortuin †	2024	2024	2	4	0	23	11	5.75	-	-	-	-	-	-	3	2
363	128	Edward Moore	2024	2024	1	2	0	23	23	11.50	-	-	-	-	-	-	1	-
364	126	Tshepo Moreki	2024	2024	2	4	2	15	6	7.50	398	11	202	2	1/32	101.00	1	-
365	129	Raynard van Tonder	2024	2024	2	4	0	64	32	16.00	-	-	-	-	-	-	2	-
366	131	Shaun von Berg	2024	2024	1	2	0	40	38	20.00	174	3	100	0	-	-	0	-
367	132	Matthew Breetzke	2024	2026	5	7	0	65	43	9.28	-	-	-	-	-	-	3	-
368	133	Corbin Bosch	2024	2026	4	6	2	245	100*	61.25	520	21	302	16	5/43	18.87	3	-
369	134	Kwena Maphaka	2024	2025	2	3	1	17	9*	8.50	260	5	170	3	2/43	56.66	2	-
370	136	Dewald Brevis	2025	2025	4	6	0	138	54	23.00	26	0	22	1	1/22	22.00	3	-
371	135	Lhuan-dre Pretorius	2025	2025	2	3	0	235	153	78.33	-	-	-	-	-	-	1	-
372	137	Codi Yusuf	2025	2025	2	2	1	35	27	35.00	282	9	122	10	3/22	12.20	2	-
373	138	Lesego Senokwane	2025	2025	1	1	0	3	3	3.00	-	-	-	-	-	-	2	-
374	139	Prenelan Subrayen	2025	2025	2	2	0	12	8	6.00	328	5	178	6	4/42	29.66	0	-
375	140	Marques Ackerman	2026	2026	4	5	0	320	157	64.00	-	-	-	-	-	-	0	-

== Shirt Number History ==
From the 2019 Ashes Series, an introduction of names and numbers on all Test players' shirts were introduced in an effort to help identify the players. This forms part of the ICC World Test Championship, a competition between the top nine Test nations played over a two-year period. The Top two teams in the standings after the two-year period plays in the Final, where the winner emerges as the World Test Champion.

S/N	Current Player	Past Player(s)
4	Aiden Markram	
5	David Bedingham	
6	-	Lizaad Williams
11	Temba Bavuma	
12	-	Quinton de Kock
13	Wiaan Mulder	
14	-	Beuran Hendricks
16	Keshav Maharaj	
18	-	Francois du Plessis
20	Anrich Nortje	
22	Lungi Ngidi	
24	-	Vernon Philander
25	Kagiso Rabada	
27	-	George Linde
29	-	Dwaine Pretorius
33	Tony de Zorzi	
37	Corbin Bosch	
39	Zubayr Hamza	
40	-	Sarel Erwee
41	-	Pieter Malan
42	Dane Paterson	
44	Ryan Rickelton	Dane Paterson
45	-	Heinrich Klaasen
47	-	Simon Harmer
51	-	Glenton Stuurman
62	Gerald Coetzee	
63	-	Dane Piedt
64	-	Dean Elgar
65		Lutho Sipamla
67	-	Senuran Muthusamy
70	Marco Jansen	
71	Nandre Burger	
72	Rassie van der Dussen	
73	Khaya Zondo	
74	Duanne Olivier	
81	Kwena Maphaka	
84	Marques Ackerman	
88	-	Theunis de Bruyn
93	Keegan Petersen	
97	Kyle Verreynne	

== See also ==
- Test cricket
- South Africa national cricket team
- List of South Africa national cricket captains
- List of South Africa ODI cricketers
- List of South Africa Twenty20 International cricketers
