= Victor Barton =

English cricketer and footballer

- Barton pictured c. 1903

Personal information
- Full name: Victor Alexander Barton
- Born: 6 October 1867; Netley, Hampshire, England
- Died: 23 March 1906 (aged 38); Southampton, Hampshire, England
- Nickname: Bombadier Barton
- Batting: Right-handed
- Bowling: Right-arm medium

International information
- National side: England
- Only Test (cap 73): 19 March 1892 v South Africa

Domestic team information
- Years: Team
- 1889–1890: Kent
- 1892–1902: Hampshire

Career statistics
Competition	Test	First-class
Matches	1	157
Runs scored	23	6,411
Batting average	23.00	24.01
100s/50s	–/–	6/30
Top score	23	205
Balls bowled	0	10,071
Wickets	–	141
Bowling average	–	28.62
5 wickets in innings	–	3
10 wickets in match	–	–
Best bowling	–	6/28
Catches/stumpings	–/–	101/–
- Source: Cricinfo, 23 April 2016

Victor Alexander Barton (6 October 1867 — 23 March 1906) was an English first-class cricketer, footballer, and soldier. Barton joined the Royal Artillery (RA) as a bombardier. He began his cricket representing the Royal Artillery Cricket Club, where his performances bought him to the attention of Kent, for whom he played first-class cricket for in 1889 and 1890. Kent bought him out of the RA in 1891, but he made no further appearances for the county, due to their need to prioritise the playing of amateurs over professionals like Barton. He toured South Africa in the winter that followed the 1891 season with an English team captained by Walter Read, and played in the tour's final match against South Africa, which was later retrospectively afforded Test status.

Returning home to England in 1892, he joined his native county, Hampshire, who were at the time a second-class county, before they regained first-class status in 1894 and joined the County Championship in 1895. Barton played first-class cricket for the county until ill-health forced his retirement in 1902. He made over 140 first-class appearances for Hampshire, scoring over 6,000 runs and taking 130 wickets. He also had a brief football career, playing for Southampton St Mary's as a goalkeeper in the 1892–93 Hampshire Senior Cup. Barton died, aged 38, from pneumonia in March 1906.

== Cricket career ==
=== Beginnings with Kent ===
The son of Benjamin Barton, a soldier, Victor Alexander Barton was born in October 1867 in Netley, Hampshire. He served in the British Army, holding the rank of bombardier in the Royal Artillery (RA). Barton helped the Royal Artillery Cricket Club (RACC) go unbeaten in 1886. He produced a number of strong performances for the RACC in the first half of the 1889 season, including against the Gentlemen of the Marylebone Cricket Club at Lord's, with Wisden describing his batting as "a superb performance" as he scored 91 runs out of a total of 167 in the RACC first innings and 102 runs out of 171 in their second innings. This caught the attention of Kent, who taking advantage of him being garrisoned in the county at Woolwich, and thus eligible to play for them, offered him a trial. In July of that season, he made his debut in first-class cricket for Kent against Yorkshire at Maidstone, with Barton making six further appearances that season. He played an important role in Kent's unlikely victory over Nottinghamshire in the final match of the season at Beckenham; requiring 52 runs, Kent struggled to 25 for 6, but Barton and George Hearne guided Kent to their total. Their victory resulted in a three-way County Champion tie between Lancashire, Nottinghamshire and Surrey.

Barton played for Kent in the first season of the County Championship in 1890, making three appearances in the competition, and played against the touring Australians. Although he was unable to find form for Kent, he headed the bowling averages for the RACC, taking 89 wickets at 9.60 runs per wicket. Having shown early promise for Kent, he did not play beyond the 1890 season, despite being bought out of the RA by the Kent committee in 1891. Amongst the causes of his intermittent appearances over his two seasons with the club was the necessity for Kent to play at least three amateurs, and sometimes as many as six or seven (particularly during the Canterbury Cricket Week). Being a professional and the abundance of amateur batsmen, his appearances were consequently limited.

Following the 1891 season, he toured South Africa with an English team (Note: All matches on the tour were played as WW Read's XI, except for the Test match, where the side played as England.) captained by Walter Read, which was one of two simultaneous England team tours, the other touring Australia. He played in ten non-first-class matches on the tour, before playing in the final match against South Africa at Cape Town, which was later retrospectively afforded Test status. In a match which England won by an innings and 189 runs, Barton batted once, making 23 runs before he was dismissed by Charles Mills. Barton is the only regular member of the RA to have played Test cricket.

=== Move to Hampshire ===
When Barton returned to England, he joined Hampshire as a professional with the backing of Russell Bencraft; they were then a second-class county with aspirations to recover the first-class status they had lost in 1885. Early in his move back to Hampshire, he coached at Winchester College for a few weeks. He then spent the next two-years qualifying to play for Hampshire; due to the qualification rules of the time, a player had to be resident in the county he wished to represent for two years. He played his first season for Hampshire in the 1892 season, topping both their batting and bowling averages. In a minor match against the touring South Africans in May 1894, Barton batted for over two hours to score 74 runs. He finished the 1894 season with a batting average of 40.90, and topped the counties bowling averages. Hampshire regained first-class status in October 1894, with Barton playing in their first County Championship match against Somerset at Taunton the following season, which Hampshire won by 11 runs. In 16 first-class matches in 1895, he scored 707 runs at an average of 22.80, and made four half-centuries. The Sporting Life noted that he was one of Hampshire's most consistent batters in 1895. In 17 matches in 1896, he scored 795 runs, averaging 29.44; he scored his maiden first-class century against Warwickshire, making 112 runs. He was afforded more opportunities to bowl in 1896, taking 17 wickets at an average of 30.29.

Prior to the 1897 season, Barton had been engaged at Marlborough College, but left there to take charge of the ground staff at the County Ground. He nearly reached the landmark of 1,000 runs in a season in 1897; from 21 matches, he scored 971 runs at an average of 27.74. Against Yorkshire he made his second first-class century, scoring 125 runs. He played in the North v South fixture for the first time in 1897, representing the South at the season-ending Scarborough Festival. He made 16 first-class appearances during the 1898 season, scoring 499 runs at a lower average of 18.48; 110 of his runs came in one innings opening the batting against Leicestershire. The Southampton Observer and Hampshire News opined that his loss of form influenced Hampshire's poor results in the 1898 County Championship. He eventually passed 1,000 runs in a season in 1899, with 1,026 at an average of 27.72; he made an unbeaten 126 runs against Leicestershire in August. He also took 38 wickets, averaging 36.15. His bowling, against Worcestershire at Southampton in August, was key to Hampshire's victory.

In September 1899, Barton accepted an invitation from Ranjitsinhji to tour the United States as the team attendant, leaving for the tour from Liverpool aboard the RMS Etruria on 19 September. After returning from the tour, Barton became seriously ill with pneumonia, which the Hampshire Independent noted had "left his life hanging in the balance"; he overcame the illness, and prior to the start of the 1900 season was sent by Bencraft and the Hampshire committee to Bournemouth to recuperate. Despite his pre-season ill-health, Barton had a successful season in 1900. He passed 1,000 runs for the second consecutive year, with 1,060 at an average of 27.17. In the County Championship in July, he became the first Hampshire professional to make a double-century, scoring 205 runs in a defeat against Sussex at Hove; the next highest score in Hampshire's first innings of 367 all out was Charles Briggs' 58. He also made seven half-centuries during the season, and took 38 wickets.

Barton achieved all-round success in the 1901 season, scoring 883 runs and averaging 26.75 from 20 matches, and taking 51 wickets at an average of 22.52. He scored the final century of his career during the season, making an unbeaten 122 runs against Kent in June. He took two five-wicket hauls across the season: Against Surrey at The Oval in May, he took figures of 6 for 28 from 21.3 overs in Surrey's first innings, with nine wickets overall in the match; the following month, he took 5 for 30 against Lancashire at Liverpool, and once again took nine wickets in the match. Such was his success in the early part of the season, Barton was selected for the Players in the Gentlemen v Players fixture at The Oval in July; as a paid professional he represented the Players, in contrast to unpaid amateurs who played for the Gentlemen. He had little success in the match. He was awarded a benefit match ahead of the 1902 season, which the Hampshire committee arranged to take place against Surrey in July 1902; in his benefit match, he took 5 for 33 in Surrey's second innings. He made twelve appearances in 1902, scoring 286 runs at an average of 13.61, whilst taking 9 wickets at 25.22. He played against the touring Australians following his benefit, but by mid-August he had fallen ill. Suffering from a deterioration in his eyesight, Barton was forced to retire.

== Playing style and statistics ==
Barton made 143 first-class appearances for Hampshire. He scored 6,204 runs at an average of 25.01 for the county, making six centuries and 30 half-centuries, with a highest score of 205 runs. Wisden described his batting style as "attractive", whilst The Times remarked that "the chief characteristic of his batting was the great power of his own driving". The Dundee Evening Telegraph remarked that Barton was often reliable when the batting around him was poor. A right-arm medium pace bowler, he was noted by The Star to have a long run-up prior to delivering the ball. Barton developed into an all-rounder later in his career, taking 130 first-class wickets for Hampshire at an average of 29.37; 89 of his wickets came in 1900 and 1901. Described by the magazine Cricket as a "splendid field", he typically fielded at mid-on, and took 101 catches across his first-class career. Summarising his cricket career, The Times wrote: "[he] never took a very high place in the cricket world, but he was a most useful bat and a quite a good change bowler".

== Football career ==
Barton also played football as a goalkeeper for Southampton St. Mary's, having been invited by Bencraft (who was soon to become president of the club) to join the team as a reserve goalkeeper. Barton made one appearance for Southampton St. Mary's in the semi-final of the Hampshire Senior Cup in February 1893, playing due to an injury to regular goalkeeper Ralph Ruffell. In the match, played at the County Ground, Southampton defeated Portsmouth 2–0. Barton was injured by the time of the final on 11 March, and was replaced by the fit again Ruffell, with Southampton losing 2–1 to local rivals Freemantle.

== Personal life and death ==
In partnership with former Southampton St. Mary's footballer Jack Dorkin, Barton ran a sports outfitters business in London Road, Southampton. He was also briefly involved in the manufacture of cricket bats, before becoming the landlord of the Alexandra Hotel in Southampton, and in 1899 he was involved in the production of mineral water. In 1896, the Southern Daily Echo organised a testimonial for him that ran in August and September, to raise funds for a gift for his forthcoming wedding. He married Louise in September 1896, with the couple having a daughter. Barton died at the Alexandra Hotel on 23 March 1906, aged 38, from pneumonia; he had been in declining health for several years. His funeral took place at Southampton Old Cemetery and was well attended by players and officials from Hampshire. Remembering Barton, Bencraft described him as the most "unassuming, gentlemanly cricketer".

== Works cited ==
- Carlaw, Derek (2020). Kent County Cricketers A to Z. Part One: 1812–1914 (PDF). Cardiff: ACS. ISBN 978-1-8577-0250-7.
- Chalk, Gary; Holley, Duncan (1987). Saints – A Complete Record. Peterborough: Breedon Books. ISBN 978-0-9079-6922-8.
- Chalk, Gary; Holley, Duncan; Bull, David (2013). All the Saints: A Complete Players' Who's Who of Southampton FC. Bristol: Hagiology Publishing. ISBN 978-0-9926-8640-6.
- Holley, Duncan; Chalk, Gary (1992). The Alphabet of the Saints. Leicester: ACL & Polar Publishing. ISBN 978-0-9514-8623-8.
- Stoddart, Brian; Sandiford, Keith A. P. (2017). The Imperial Game. Manchester University Press. p. 16. ISBN 978-1-5261-2382-4.
- Sweetman, Simon (2012). H. V. Hesketh-Prichard: Amazing Stories. Cardiff: ACS. ISBN 978-1-9081-6521-3.
