= Thomas Rutledge =

Thomas Rutledge may refer to:

- Thomas Rutledge (1819–1904), Australian politician
- Thomas Lloyd Forster Rutledge (1889–1958), Australian politician
- Tom Rutledge, American cable television executive

== See also ==
- Thomas Routledge (1867–1927), South African cricketer
