= Krom =

Krom may refer to:

- Krom (ក្រុម [krom]), one of the Administrative divisions of Cambodia
- Krom (กรม), a Thai-language term which may refer to:
  - Krom, each of the Thai government ministries under the historical chatusadom system
  - Krom, a form of Thai royal title
  - Krom, a type of Thai government agency, translated as department
- Krom River, a river in the Eastern Cape Province in South Africa
- Kampuchea Krom, a region of the Mekong Delta now part of Vietnam
  - Khmer Krom, the ethnic Khmer people of that region
- Phnom Krom, a hill close to Siem Reap, Cambodia
- Pskov Krom, an ancient citadel in Pskov, Russia
- Krom Stone House and Dutch Barn, a historic home and Dutch barn located at Rochester in Ulster County, New York

== People ==
- Krom Hendricks, South African cricketer
- Krom Ngoy (Poet Ou; 1865–1936), Khmer poet
- Beth Krom (born 1958), American politician
- Toomas Krõm (born 1971), Estonian football player

== See also ==
- KROM
- Chromium (film), a 2015 Albanian film, released as Krom in Albania
