= Fichardt =

Fichardt is a surname. Notable people with the surname include:

- Charles Fichardt (1870–1923), South African cricketer
- Darren Fichardt (born 1975), South African golfer
- Gustav Fichardt (born 1965), South African tennis player and coach
