= International cricket in 1895–96 =

International cricket season

The 1895–96 international cricket season was from September 1895 to April 1896.

== Season overview ==
International tours
| Start date | Home team | Away team | Results [Matches] | | | |
| Start date | Home team | Away team | Test | ODI | FC | LA |
|---|---|---|---|---|---|---|
| 30 December 1895 | New Zealand | New South Wales | — | — | 1–0 [1] | — |
| 13 February 1896 | South Africa | England | 0–3 [3] | — | — | — |

== February ==
=== England in South Africa ===
Test match series
| No. | Date | Home captain | Away captain | Venue | Result |
|---|---|---|---|---|---|
| Test No: 47 | 13–14 February | Barberton Halliwell | Tim O'Brien | St George's Park Cricket Ground, Port Elizabeth | England by 288 runs |
| Test No: 48 | 2–4 March | Barberton Halliwell | Lord Hawke | Old Wanderers, Gqeberha | England by an innings and 197 runs |
| Test No: 49 | 21–23 March | Alfred Richards | Lord Hawke | Newlands Cricket Ground, Cape Town | England by an innings and 33 runs |
