= Richard Halliwell (cricketer) =

English cricketer (1842–1881)

Richard Bisset Halliwell (30 November 1842 – 9 November 1881) was an English first-class cricketer active 1865–73 who played for Middlesex. He was born in Bloomsbury and died in St Pancras, London. He played in 43 first-class matches as a righthanded batsman, scoring 502 runs with a highest score of 38*; and as a wicketkeeper, holding 35 catches and completing 41 stumped. He was the father of South Africa's captain and wicketkeeper Ernest Halliwell.
