= Clement Johnson =

South African cricketer

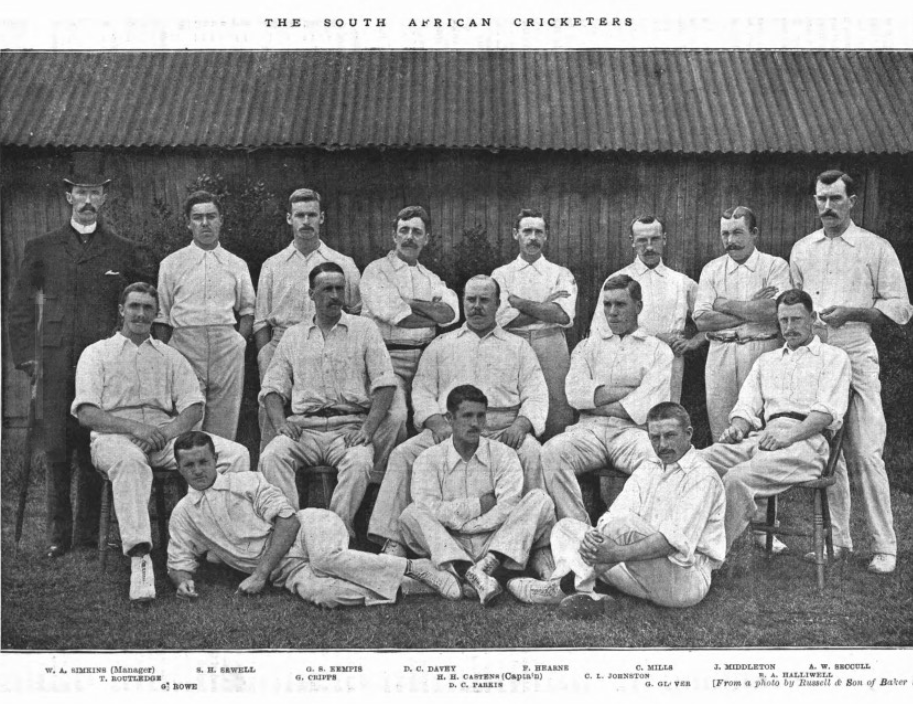
- The South African team in 1894. Clement Johnson is in the middle row, second from the right.

Personal information
- Full name: Clement Lecky Johnson
- Born: 31 March 1871; Carbury, Ireland
- Died: 31 May 1908 (aged 37); Roodepoort, Transvaal
- Batting: Right-handed
- Bowling: Right-arm medium fast
- Role: All-rounder

International information
- National side: South Africa
- Only Test (cap 32): 2 March 1896 v England

Domestic team information
- Years: Team
- 1893–94: Transvaal

Career statistics
Competition	Tests	First-class
Matches	1	4
Runs scored	10	117
Batting average	5.00	16.71
100s/50s	0/0	0/1
Top score	7	52
Balls bowled	140	470
Wickets	–	3
Bowling average	–	65.66
5 wickets in innings	–	0
10 wickets in match	–	0
Best bowling	–	1/27
Catches/stumpings	1/-	2/-
- Source: CricketArchive, 12 August 2017

Clement Lecky Johnson (31 March 1871 – 31 May 1908) was an Irish cricketer who represented South Africa in a single Test match in 1896.

== Career ==
Clement Johnson was born in Carbury, County Kildare, Ireland, on 31 March 1871. He was educated at Trinity College, Dublin, where he played for Dublin University Cricket Club from 1889 to 1893. He represented Ireland in minor matches between 1890 and 1893, and toured North America with the Gentlemen of Ireland team in 1892.

Johnson left Ireland for health reasons in 1893, settling in the Transvaal. There he made his first-class debut in the 1893–94 season, playing two matches for the Transvaal team in the Currie Cup. Shortly afterwards, he was selected for the South African team to tour England in 1894. 24 matches were played on the tour, none of which were first class. Johnson scored 508 runs at an average of 14.32 and took 50 wickets at an average of 17.27. His best scores were 112 against Liverpool and District and 79 against the Gentlemen of Ireland.

Johnson made his only Test appearance for South Africa in March 1896, when he played against England at the Old Wanderers ground, Johannesburg. Having taken 0/57 in the first innings, he then scored 3 and 7 as South Africa followed on and lost by an innings.

Johnson died at Maraisburg, Roodepoort, Transvaal, on 31 May 1908, aged 37.
