= Darnton Davey =

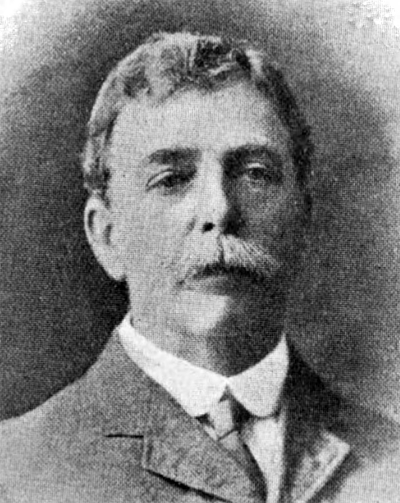

Personal information
- Full name: Darnton Charles Davey
- Born: 7 July 1856; Mansfield, Nottinghamshire, England
- Died: 7 October 1911 (aged 55); Durban, Natal, South Africa

Domestic team information
- Years: Team
- 1889–90 to 1897–98: Natal

Career statistics
| Competition | First-class |
|---|---|
| Matches | 12 |
| Runs scored | 555 |
| Batting average | 25.22 |
| 100s/50s | 0/4 |
| Top score | 80 |
| Balls bowled | 95 |
| Wickets | 2 |
| Bowling average | 34.00 |
| 5 wickets in innings | 0 |
| 10 wickets in match | 0 |
| Best bowling | 1/5 |
| Catches/stumpings | 11/– |
- Source: Cricinfo, 2 September 2017

Darnton Charles "Don" Davey (7 July 1856 – 7 October 1911) was a cricketer who played first-class cricket for Natal from 1889 to 1898.

== Life and career ==
An opening and middle-order batsman and slow bowler, who also played as a wicketkeeper for Natal in 1889–90, Don Davey was born in England and educated in Colchester. He played a few minor games for Essex before going in his mid-20s to Natal, where he worked as an engineer with the Natal Harbour Board.

Davey toured England with the first South African touring team in 1894, when no first-class matches were played. He suffered a leg injury just when he was beginning to make useful scores, and was unable to play again on the tour.

Davey was one of the most prominent cricketers in Natal in the 1880s and early 1890s. He made 80, the highest score of the match, when Natal lost to Transvaal by one wicket in the Currie Cup in 1894–95. A few days later he umpired the Currie Cup final. He top-scored (making 78) for Natal in his last first-class innings, against Border in 1897–98.

Davey died of heart disease in Durban in October 1911, aged 55.
