= George Tapscott =

South Africa.cricketer (1889–1940)

Personal information
- Full name: George Lancelot Tapscott
- Born: 7 November 1889; Barkly West, Cape Colony
- Died: 13 December 1940 (aged 51); Kimberley, South Africa
- Nickname: Dusty
- Batting: Right-handed
- Bowling: Right-arm medium
- Role: Batsman
- Relatives: Lionel Tapscott (brother); Billie Tapscott (sister)

International information
- National side: South Africa
- Only Test (cap 86): 13 December 1913 v England

Domestic team information
- Years: Team
- 1910/11–1922/23: Griqualand West

Career statistics
Competition	Test	First-class
Matches	1	21
Runs scored	5	934
Batting average	2.50	26.68
100s/50s	0/0	2/5
Top score	4	111
Balls bowled	–	1,785
Wickets	–	47
Bowling average	–	21.40
5 wickets in innings	–	2
10 wickets in match	–	0
Best bowling	–	5/47
Catches/stumpings	1/–	12/–
- Source: CricketArchive, 8 October 2019

George Lancelot "Dusty" Tapscott (7 November 1889 – 13 December 1940) was a South African cricketer who played in one Test match in 1913. His brother, Lionel, also played Test cricket for South Africa and his sister Billie was a tennis player who reached the quarterfinals at the French Championships and Wimbledon.
