= Dante Parkin =

South African cricketer (1873–1936)

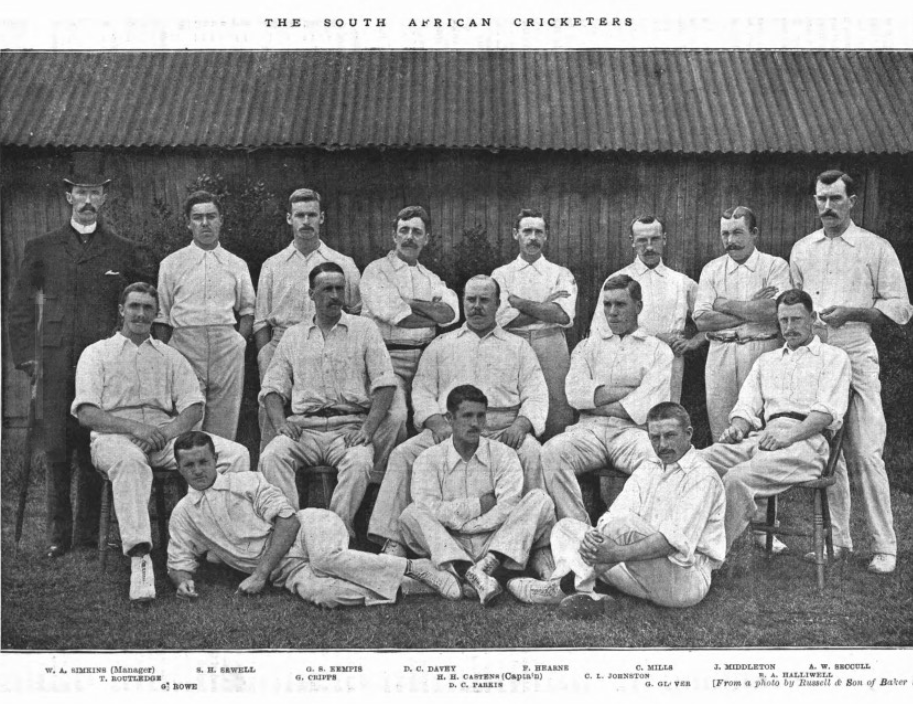
- The South African team in 1894. Dante Parkin is sitting on the ground in the centre.

Personal information
- Full name: Durant Clifford Parkin
- Born: 20 February 1873; Port Elizabeth, Cape Colony
- Died: 20 March 1936 (aged 63); Sangster's Farm, Albany, Cape Province, South Africa
- Nickname: Dante
- Batting: Right-handed
- Bowling: Right-arm medium

International information
- National side: South Africa
- Only Test (cap 21): 19 March 1892 v England

Domestic team information
- Years: Team
- 1890–91 to 1896–97: Eastern Province
- 1902–03: Griqualand West

Career statistics
Competition	Test	First-class
Matches	1	12
Runs scored	6	334
Batting average	3.00	15.18
100s/50s	0/0	0/1
Top score	6	63*
Balls bowled	130	2089
Wickets	3	48
Bowling average	27.33	20.29
5 wickets in innings	0	3
10 wickets in match	0	1
Best bowling	3/82	6/25
Catches/stumpings	1/–	8/–
- Source: Cricinfo, 5 February 2021

Durant Clifford "Dante" Parkin (20 February 1873 – 20 March 1936) was a South African cricketer who played in one Test match in 1892.

In 1890–91 Parkin took 4 for 69 and 6 for 25 when Eastern Province narrowly beat Griqualand West in the Champion Bat Tournament. In 1891–92 he took seven wickets (match figures of 74–36–59–7, five-ball overs) and five catches when the Eastern Province XVIII lost to Walter Read's English touring team. Three weeks later he was one of eight South Africans who made their Test debuts in the only Test played on the tour. He opened the bowling and took the first three wickets to reduce England to 33 for 3 in reply to South Africa's first innings of 97, but the English lower order rallied and England went on to win by an innings.

Parkin toured England with South Africa's first touring team in 1894, when no first-class matches were played, but was unsuccessful. He played for Griqualand West in the 1902–03 season.
