= Clarence Wimble =

South African cricketer (1861–1930)

Personal information
- Full name: Clarence Skelton Wimble
- Born: 22 April 1861; Graaff-Reinet, Cape Colony
- Died: 28 January 1930 (aged 68); Parktown West, Johannesburg, South Africa
- Batting: Right-handed

International information
- National side: South Africa
- Only Test (cap 23): 19 March 1892 v England

Career statistics
Competition	Tests	First-class
Matches	1	2
Runs scored	0	108
Batting average	0.00	27.00
100s/50s	0/0	0/1
Top score	0	62
Catches/stumpings	0/–	0/–
- Source: Cricinfo, 4 May 2019

Clarence Skelton Wimble (22 April 1861 – 28 January 1930) was a South African cricketer who played one Test match in 1892.

A right-handed batsman and superior fieldsman, Wimble's first-class cricket career comprised just two matches in eleven months. His debut came in a Currie Cup match in April 1891 when Kimberley came to the Old Wanderers ground at Johannesburg and defeated Transvaal. In a timeless match lasting seven days, Wimble top-scored for Transvaal in the first innings with 62 and followed with 46 in the second innings. This performance contributed to his selection for South Africa's sole Test against England in 1891-92, played at Newlands in Cape Town in March 1892. In a three-day match completely dominated by the visitors – England won by an innings and 189 runs – Wimble had the ignominy of scoring a pair, caught in the first innings and stumped in the second.

Wimble lived in Parktown West in Johannesburg. He worked as an accountant. He died of myocarditis at home in January 1930, aged 67.
