= English cricket team in South Africa in 1891–92 =

International cricket tour

	South Africa	England
- Dates: 19 – 22 March 1892
Captains	WH Milton	WW Read

Test series
- Result: England won the 1-match series 1–0
Most runs	F Hearne (47)	H Wood (134)
Most wickets	DC Parkin (3)	JJ Ferris (13)

An English cricket team, organised and led by the Surrey amateur Walter Read, toured South Africa from December 1891 to March 1892. There is uncertainty about the status of South African cricket as a whole in the late nineteenth century and so Read's matches against the main provincial teams, such as Transvaal and Western Province, are not rated first-class. The only first-class match on the tour is one in March against a South African national team which was retrospectively awarded Test status. Read's XI is therefore designated England for this match and they won the Test by an innings and 189 runs. The South African Test team was captained by William Henry Milton.

== Test series summary ==
19–22 March 1892
Scorecard

South Africa	v	England
97 (58.2 overs); F Hearne 24; JJ Ferris 6/54 (29.2 overs)		369 (119.2 overs); H Wood 134*; DC Parkin 3/82 (26 overs)
83 (49.3 overs); F Hearne 23; JJ Ferris 7/37 (25 overs)

England won by an innings and 189 runs
Newlands, Cape Town
Umpires: J Leaney and CN Thomas

- South Africa won the toss and elected to bat.
- 20 March was taken as a rest day.
- TW Routledge, CG Fichardt, CH Mills, EA Halliwell, CS Wimble, G Cripps, DC Parkin and JF du Toit (all SA), and W Chatterton, A Hearne, GG Hearne, VA Barton, AD Pougher and JT Hearne (all ENG) made their Test debuts. F Hearne made his debut for South Africa, having previously played for England. JJ Ferris and WL Murdoch made their debuts for England, having previously played for Australia.

The match was retrospectively granted Test status. At the time it was known as a South African XI versus W. W. Read's XI. South Africa won the toss and batted first. They were soon all out for 97, with John Ferris taking 6 for 54. In reply, an innings of 134 from Henry Wood saw Read's side total 369, a lead of 272 that South Africa were never likely to catch. Ferris's 7 for 37 helped dismiss the South Africans for 83 in their second innings. This Test match still holds the record for the highest aggregate of runs (549) without a leg bye being scored.

The game is more interesting for some historical oddities:

- Billy Murdoch and Ferris, who had both previously played for Australia, played for England due to residence.
- Frank Hearne, who played for South Africa in this game, had previously played for England. Finally, the game gives the second instance of three brothers playing in the same Test match, as Frank Hearne's brothers, Alec Hearne and George Hearne played for England. A cousin, John Thomas Hearne also played for the tourists.
- The tour was simultaneous to the English cricket team in Australia in 1891–92, both teams deemed to have "Test status".

== The tour ==
There were 20 matches on the tour. Apart from the Test match, all of them were against teams of 15, 18 or 22 players. The English team won 13 matches and drew seven. The leading player was Ferris, who took 235 wickets at an average of 5.46. J. T. Hearne took 163 wickets at 6.84, and Martin took 109 at 8.43. The outstanding batsman was Chatterton, who made 955 runs at an average of 41.52. The next best was Murdoch, with 633 runs at 27.52.
