= Gus Kempis =

South African cricketer (1865–1890)

Personal information
- Full name: Gustav Adolph Kempis
- Born: 4 August 1865; Port Elizabeth, Cape Colony
- Died: 19 May 1890 (aged 24); Chiloane Island, Portuguese Mozambique
- Batting: Right-handed
- Bowling: Left-arm medium
- Relatives: George Kempis (brother)

International information
- National side: South Africa
- Only Test (cap 4): 12 March 1889 v England

Career statistics
Competition	Test	First-class
Matches	1	6
Runs scored	0	60
Batting average	0.00	6.00
100s/50s	0/0	0/0
Top score	0*	24
Balls bowled	168	1,248
Wickets	4	45
Bowling average	19.00	13.00
5 wickets in innings	0	4
10 wickets in match	0	2
Best bowling	3/53	7/33
Catches/stumpings	0/–	2/–
- Source: Cricinfo, 6 September 2017

Gustav Adolph Kempis (4 August 1865 – 19 May 1890) was a South African cricketer who played in South Africa's inaugural Test match in March 1889.

Kempis was born in Port Elizabeth, Cape Colony. A left-arm medium pace bowler, he delivered the ball with great control of length and could break it either way off the pitch. After taking 13 wickets in three non-first-class innings against R. G. Warton's touring side in 1888-89, he was selected for what became the very first Test match between the two countries, played at Port Elizabeth. He failed with the bat but took 3 for 53 and 1 for 23 as England won comfortably by 8 wickets.

The following season, playing for Natal, Kempis took 41 wickets at an average of 12.42 apiece. These figures came from just five matches and included four hauls of more than 5 wickets in an innings and two of 10 wickets in a match: 7 for 35 and 4 for 29 against Port Elizabeth, 7 for 44 against Kimberley, 7 for 33 and 3 for 76 against Western Province and 5 for 20 against Cape Town Clubs. He was easily the most successful bowler in the season.

He died shortly after the 1889–90 season finished, aged 24, in Chiloane Island, Mozambique. His death went unrecorded at the time and no obituary appeared for him in Wisden Cricketer's Almanack.

His younger brother George toured England with the first South African touring team in 1894.

== Sources ==
- World Cricketers - A Biographical Dictionary by Christopher Martin-Jenkins published by Oxford University Press (1996)
- The Wisden Book of Test Cricket, Volume 1 (1877-1977) compiled and edited by Bill Frindall published by Headline Book Publishing (1995)
- Who's Who of Cricketers by Philip Bailey, Philip Thorn & Peter Wynne-Thomas published by Hamlyn (1993)
