= Thomas Routledge =

Tommy Routledge
Personal information
- Full name: Thomas William Routledge
- Born: 18 April 1867; Liverpool, Lancashire, England
- Died: 9 May 1927 (aged 60); Billingham, County Durham, England
- Batting: Right-handed
- Bowling: Right-arm medium

International information
- National side: South Africa
- Test debut (cap 22): 19 March 1892 v England
- Last Test: 21 March 1896 v England

Domestic team information
- Years: Team
- 1892–93 to 1896–97: Transvaal

Career statistics
Competition	Tests	First-class
Matches	4	12
Runs scored	72	492
Batting average	9.00	21.39
100s/50s	0/0	0/2
Top score	24	77
Balls bowled	0	105
Wickets	0	3
Bowling average	-	23.00
5 wickets in innings	0	0
10 wickets in match	0	0
Best bowling	-	2/26
Catches/stumpings	2/0	5/0
- Source: Cricinfo, 24 April 2020

Thomas William Routledge (18 April 1867 – 9 May 1927) was a cricketer who played Test cricket for South Africa in the 1890s. He was an attacking batsman and occasional bowler.

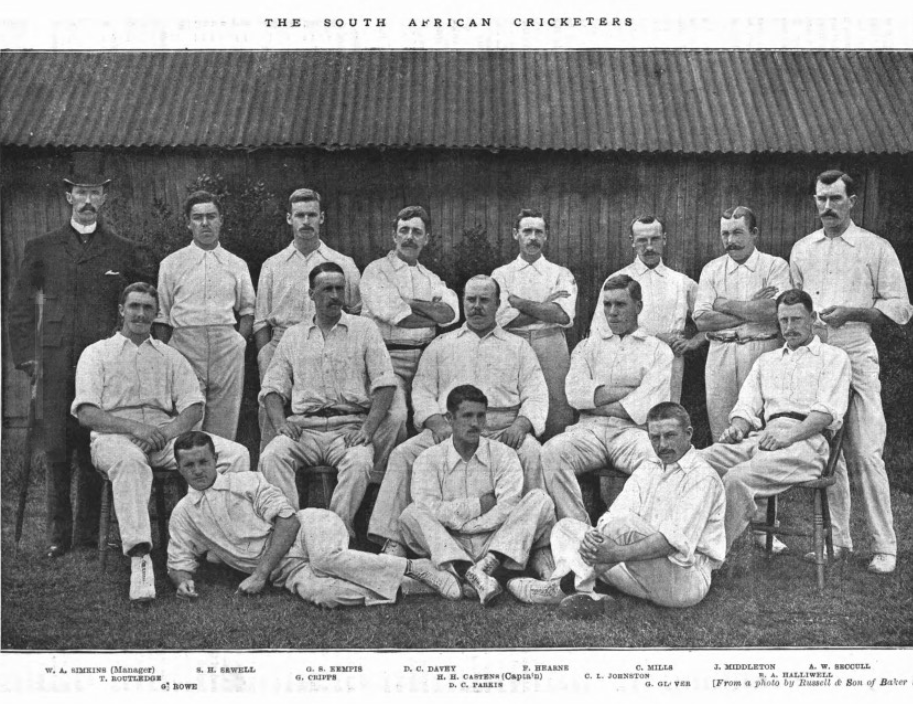
The South African team that toured England in 1894. Routledge is seated at the far left.

Thomas Routledge was born in England, where he learned his cricket, and he moved to South Africa in 1889. A hard-hitting batsman with a strong defence, he played first-class cricket for Transvaal during the 1890s and appeared in four Test matches for South Africa against England, all of them in South Africa. He was an aggressive batsman but often failed to convert a good start into a significant one, only twice reaching 50 in his 24 first-class innings.

His first Test match was the sole representative match of England's visit in 1891–92, played at Cape Town. He also played in the three-match series of 1895–96 but in all his four Tests he could only manage a top score of 24 as England won each match convincingly. Routledge's highest first-class score was 77, scored in the 1893–94 Currie Cup match against Eastern Province at Cape Town.

On the day the meeting was held to select South Africa's inaugural side to tour England in 1894, Routledge made a century in a non-first-class match and secured his place as a result of it. None of the 24 matches on the tour have first-class status even though many of them were against first-class county clubs. He was the touring team's second-highest scorer, with 758 runs at an average of 20.21 and a highest score of 152. No obituary appeared in Wisden Cricketers' Almanack for Routledge after his death in 1927.
