= George Kempis =

South African cricketer

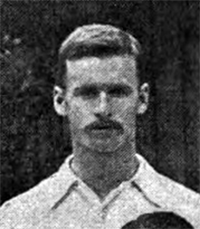
- George Kempis in 1894

Personal information
- Full name: George Stephen Kempis
- Born: 25 November 1871; Port Elizabeth, Cape Colony
- Died: 17 March 1948 (aged 76); Scottburgh, Natal, South Africa
- Bowling: Right-arm medium
- Relatives: Gus Kempis (brother)

Domestic team information
- Years: Team
- 1892/93–1893/94: Transvaal

Career statistics
Competition	First-class
Matches	3
Runs scored	59
Batting average	11.80
100s/50s	0/0
Top score	20
Balls bowled	390
Wickets	7
Bowling average	28.57
5 wickets in innings	0
10 wickets in match	0
Best bowling	4/34
Catches/stumpings	3/–
- Source: Cricinfo, 2 September 2017

George Stephen Kempis (25 November 1871 – 17 March 1948) was a cricketer who played first-class cricket for Transvaal from 1892 to 1894.

A medium-pace bowler, his best bowling performance came in Transvaal's match against Griqualand West in 1892–93, when he opened the bowling in the second innings and took 4 for 34. He toured England with the first South African touring team in 1894, when no first-class matches were played, but he had little success.

His elder brother Gus played in South Africa's inaugural Test match in 1889.
