= Charles Mills (South African cricketer) =

South African cricketer and coach (1866–1948)

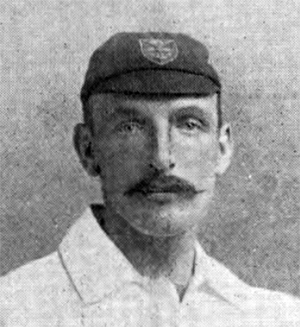
- Mills in 1905

Personal information
- Born: 26 November 1866; Camberwell, England
- Died: 26 July 1948 (aged 81); Southwark, England
- Batting: Right-handed
- Bowling: Right-arm medium

International information
- National side: South Africa
- Only Test (cap 20): 19 March 1892 v England

Career statistics
Competition	Test	First-class
Matches	1	8
Runs scored	25	160
Batting average	12.50	12.30
100s/50s	0/0	0/0
Top score	21	31
Balls bowled	140	1178
Wickets	2	29
Bowling average	41.50	15.55
5 wickets in innings	0	3
10 wickets in match	0	0
Best bowling	2/83	5/36
Catches/stumpings	2/–	11/–
- Source: Cricinfo, 31 October 2025

Charles Mills (26 November 1866 – 26 July 1948) was a cricketer who played in one Test match for South Africa in 1892.

== Life and career ==
Born in London, to Charles Mills a writing engraver and Sarah Jane Wilkinson, Mills was educated at Dulwich College in London. After leaving school he briefly studied art before deciding to become a professional cricketer. A medium-pace bowler and a steady batsman, he played for Surrey from 1885 to 1896, mostly for the club's secondary teams, but including two first-class matches in 1888.

With his Surrey colleague Bill Brockwell, Mills went to South Africa for the 1889–90 season in the hope of finding a coaching position, which they both did in Kimberley. In Mills's first match for the Kimberley Club he scored 297, which was at the time a record score in South Africa. He played a first-class match for Kimberley later that season, when Brockwell took 10 wickets in an innings victory over Natal.

In 1890-91 Mills took up a coaching position in Cape Town, where he stayed for four years, playing in the Western Province team that won the Currie Cup in 1893–94. In March 1892 he played for South Africa in the Test against England, scoring 4 and 21 in a match in which the highest score by a South African batsman was 24.

Mills toured England with the South African team in 1894, in which no first-class matches were played, scoring 452 runs at an average of 14.58, and taking 28 wickets at 23.71. He took his best bowling figures in his last first-class match, for Western Province in the final of the 1894–95 Currie Cup against Transvaal: 5 for 36 in the second innings.

He returned to England in the mid-1890s. He coached in Philadelphia and Scotland and at the English public schools Haileybury, Bradfield and Mill Hill. He umpired Minor Counties matches, mostly involving Norfolk, from 1904 to 1906.
