= Godfrey Cripps =

South African cricketer (1865–1943)

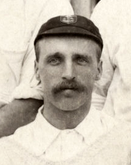
- Cripps in 1894

Personal information
- Born: 19 October 1865; Mussoorie, India
- Died: 27 July 1943 (aged 77); Adelaide, Australia
- Batting: Right-handed
- Bowling: Right-arm

International information
- National side: South Africa
- Test debut (cap 15): 19 March 1892 v England

Career statistics
Competition	Tests	First-class
Matches	1	4
Runs scored	21	217
Batting average	10.50	31.00
100s/50s	0 / 0	1 / 0
Top score	18	102
Balls bowled	15	65
Wickets	0	1
Bowling average	–	59.00
5 wickets in innings	0	0
10 wickets in match	0	0
Best bowling	–	1/18
Catches/stumpings	0 / 0	4 / 0
- Source: Cricinfo, 18 November 2018

Godfrey Cripps (19 October 1865 in Mussoorie, India – 27 July 1943 in Adelaide, Australia) was a cricketer who played in one Test for South Africa in 1891–92.

== Life and career ==
Born in India and educated at Cheltenham College in England, Cripps played just four first-class cricket matches, all of them in South Africa. A middle-order right-handed batsman, his first first-class appearance was in the South African Test side in March 1892 that lost to Walter Read's English touring team – which included the Australian players Billy Murdoch and John Ferris. Cripps was one of four South Africans who were making their first-class debuts in this Test match.

A season later, Cripps played twice for Western Province, scoring a century in the second match against Griqualand West. His final first-class game was the 1893–94 Currie Cup final for Western Province against Natal which his side won inside two days.

In 1894, he was vice-captain of the South African tour team to England, but no first-class matches were played on the tour. At the time he was working as a cashier for the African Banking Corporation.

Cripps was a cousin of the British Cabinet minister Sir Stafford Cripps. He had been a deputy sheriff in the Cape Colony before going to Australia some 30 years before his death. At the time of his death in July 1943 he was living at Simpson Road in the Adelaide suburb of Wattle Park. He had been a schoolmaster in Australia, initially in Queensland and then at St Peter's College, Adelaide, until 10 years before his death.
