= Nicolaas Theunissen =

South African cricketer and clergyman (1867–1929)

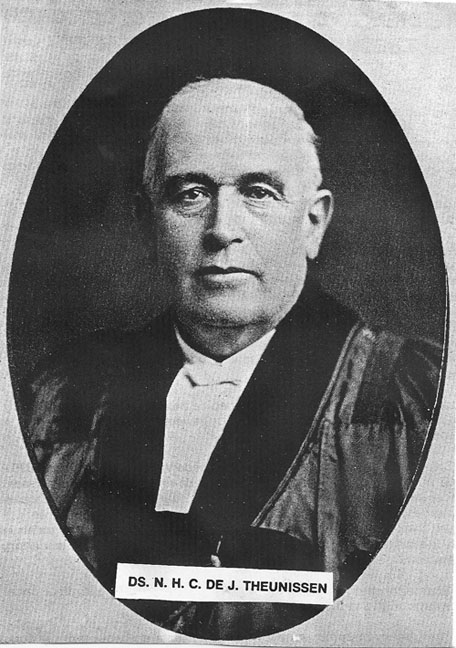

Personal information
- Full name: Nicolaas Hendrik Christiaan de Jong Theunissen
- Born: 4 May 1867; Colesberg, Cape Colony
- Died: 9 November 1929 (aged 62); Greylingstad, Transvaal, South Africa
- Batting: Right-handed
- Bowling: Right-arm fast

International information
- National side: South Africa
- Only Test (cap 14): 25 March 1889 v England

Career statistics
Competition	Tests	First-class
Matches	1	3
Runs scored	2	66
Batting average	2.00	22.00
100s/50s	0/0	0/0
Top score	2*	49
Balls bowled	80	579
Wickets	0	20
Bowling average	–	12.35
5 wickets in innings	–	3
10 wickets in match	–	1
Best bowling	–	7/41
Catches/stumpings	0/–	1/–
- Source: Cricinfo

Nicolaas Hendrik Christiaan de Jong Theunissen (4 May 1867 – 9 November 1929) was a South African cricketer who played in one Test match in 1889. He became a minister of the Dutch Reformed Church.

== Cricket career ==
Described at the time as "a right-hander who bumps them down rather short, with variety of pace and a quick break back", Theunissen was an opening bowler who took 34 wickets in three non-first-class matches for provincial sides against the touring R. G. Warton's XI in 1888–89. Some of the English batsmen were hampered by blows on the knuckles and the ribs from his deliveries.

At the time of the tour, Theunissen was studying theology at Stellenbosch University, where his professors refused to give him time off to play for South Africa in the First Test in Port Elizabeth in March 1889. He was allowed to play in the Second Test in nearby Cape Town at the end of the tour, when he opened South Africa's bowling but failed to take a wicket. He was the first Afrikaner to play Test cricket for South Africa.

In 1889–90 Theunissen played two first-class matches in Cape Town. In the first, he took 5 for 55 and 6 for 53 for Western Province against Natal. In the second, which began the day after the previous one ended, he took 2 for 47 and 7 for 41 for Cape Town Clubs against Natal.

== Personal life ==
Theunissen married Martha Maria May van Zyl in Colesberg in 1893. They had a large family. From 1916 until his death in 1929, Theunissen was a minister of the Dutch Reformed Church in the Transvaal town of Greylingstad (now in Mpumalanga).
