= Discharge by purchase =

Method of military discharge

Discharge by purchase, also known as buying oneself out of service, refers to the process of obtaining a military discharge by making a payment. This payment effectively functions as a fine for leaving military service before the contractually agreed-upon date when enlisting. The term "exemption by purchase" is a similar concept that applies to conscription.

In the United States military, discharge by purchase was introduced in 1890 for the Army, 1902 for the Marine Corps, and 1906 for the Navy. This practice was abolished in 1953. In the Irish Defence Forces, discharge by purchase is permitted under the Defence Act 1954. Typically, discharge by purchase is suspended during wartime. For example, in the British Armed Forces, this practice was suspended in 1950 during the Korean War and reintroduced in 1953. The decision to accept an application for discharge by purchase is typically at the discretion of the commanding officer.

Discharge by purchase has been a subject of debate and controversy in various countries. Proponents argue that it provides a legitimate way for individuals to leave military service if their personal circumstances change or if they no longer wish to serve. Opponents, however, argue that it can lead to a system where only the financially privileged can buy their way out of service, leaving the burden on those who cannot afford to do so.

In some cases, discharge by purchase has also been used as a means to raise funds for military organizations or governments. In the early 20th century, for example, the British Army reportedly raised significant funds by allowing soldiers to purchase their discharge, which helped finance military operations and maintain the force.
