= George Rowe (cricketer) =

South African cricketer

Personal information
- Full name: George Alexander Rowe
- Born: 15 June 1874; Grahamstown, Cape Colony
- Died: 8 January 1950 (aged 75); Pinelands, Cape Town, Cape Province, South Africa
- Batting: Right-handed
- Bowling: Slow left-arm orthodox

International information
- National side: South Africa

Domestic team information
- Years: Team
- 1893-94 to 1906-07: Western Province

Career statistics
Competition	Tests	First-class
Matches	5	36
Runs scored	26	303
Batting average	4.33	7.04
100s/50s	0/0	0/0
Top score	13*	21*
Balls bowled	998	8093
Wickets	15	170
Bowling average	30.39	21.12
5 wickets in innings	1	13
10 wickets in match	0	5
Best bowling	5/115	8/25
Catches/stumpings	4/0	22/0
- Source: Cricinfo, 18 February 2021

George Alexander Rowe (15 June 1874 – 8 January 1950) was a South African cricketer.

One of the earliest successful South African bowlers, George Rowe was born in Grahamstown, Cape Colony, on 15 June 1874. Playing for Western Province during the early years of the Currie Cup, he made his first class debut against Natal in 1893/94 in the final of the competition, and played his last match for the province in 1907. He was a slow left-arm orthodox bowler and claimed five wickets in an innings on thirteen occasions, converting five of them into ten-wicket match hauls. He first made his mark on South Africa's non-first-class tour of England in 1894 where he was the pick of the bowlers in a wet summer, taking 136 wickets at 12.87 apiece.

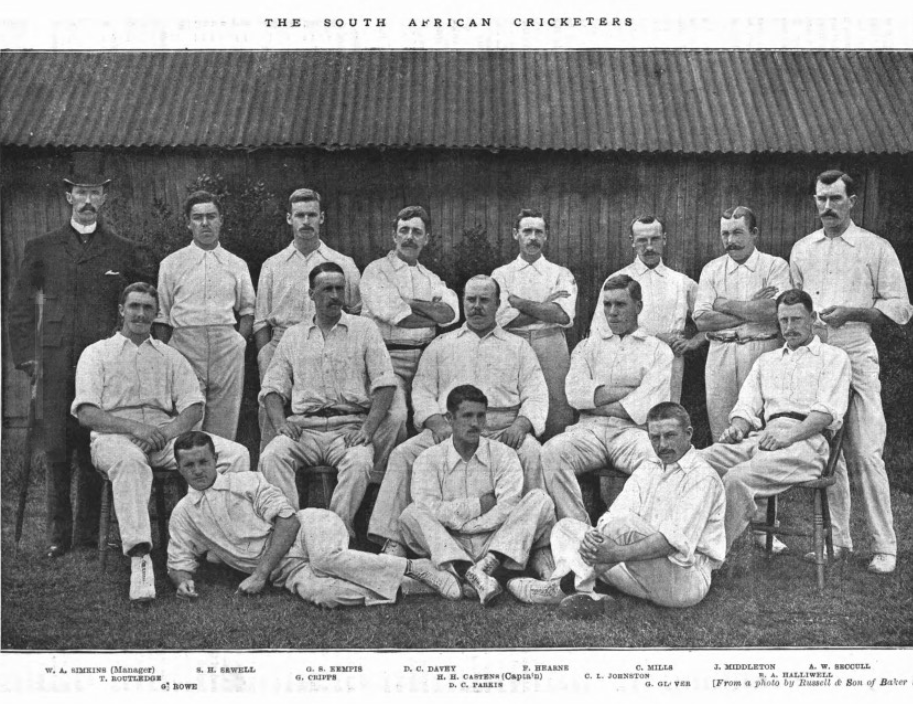
The South African team that toured England in 1894. George Rowe is in front on the ground, on the left.

When Lord Hawke brought England to the continent in 1895–96, Rowe was selected for the second and third Tests of the series. In the first of these, played at the Old Wanderers Ground, at Johannesburg, not only did he bowl T. C. O'Brien with his second ball in Tests, he also distinguished himself with 5 wickets for 115 runs in England's only innings. Lord Hawke and England returned in 1898–99 and Rowe played in both Tests, taking a total of 7 for 186 as the visitors won the series.

Back in England with South Africa in 1901, Rowe again shone, taking 136 wickets in all matches at an average of 18.54, and 70 wickets in first-class matches at 25.00. On the way home from England in 1902, Australia stopped off in South Africa and played half-a-dozen matches during October and November. Rowe was selected for one of the three Test matches but did little of note in a drawn game played at Johannesburg.

Rowe's best first-class innings analysis was 8 for 25 (11 for 50 in the match) at the expense of South-West Districts at Mossel Bay in 1904/05. His best match figures were 13 for 155 against Cambridge University at Fenner's on the 1901 tour. He was nothing much of note as a batsman, playing as he always did in the tail.

Rowe worked as a clerk in the Agriculture Department until he retired. He died at his home in Pinelands, Cape Town, on 8 January 1950, aged 75.

== See also ==
- List of South Africa cricketers who have taken five-wicket hauls on Test debut
