= Bonnor Middleton =

South African cricketer

- Middleton in 1894

Personal information
- Full name: James Middleton
- Born: 13 September 1865; Chester-le-Street, England
- Died: 23 December 1913 (aged 48); Cape Town, Cape Province, South Africa
- Nickname: Bonnor
- Batting: Right-handed
- Bowling: Left-arm slow-medium

International information
- National side: South Africa

Career statistics
Competition	Tests	First-class
Matches	6	31
Runs scored	52	176
Batting average	7.42	6.06
100s/50s	0/0	0/0
Top score	22	32
Balls bowled	1064	5571
Wickets	24	140
Bowling average	18.41	18.02
5 wickets in innings	2	10
10 wickets in match	0	4
Best bowling	5/51	7/64
Catches/stumpings	1/–	14/–
- Source: Cricinfo

James "Bonnor" Middleton (30 September 1865 – 23 December 1913) was a South African cricketer who played in six Tests from 1896 to 1902. On his debut, he took five wickets in the first innings against England in Port Elizabeth in 1896.

Middleton served in the British Army until Cape Town Cricket Club bought his release so he could become their professional. A left-arm slow-medium opening bowler, Middleton played for Western Province from 1890–91 to 1903–04. His best first-class figures were 7 for 64 in the Currie Cup final against Transvaal in 1897–98. He took 12 for 100 in the match, which Western Province won.

Middleton was one of the leading players on South Africa's tour of England in 1894 when no Tests were played; in the South Africans' narrow victory over MCC at Lord's he bowled unchanged through both innings to take 6 for 48 and 6 for 35.

His nickname was given because of his resemblance, as a hard-hitting batsman, to the Australian Test cricketer George Bonnor. He died in Cape Town of heart failure after severe attacks of asthma and bronchitis.

== See also ==
- List of South Africa cricketers who have taken five-wicket hauls on Test debut
