= Charles Fichardt =

South African cricketer and politician (1870–1923)

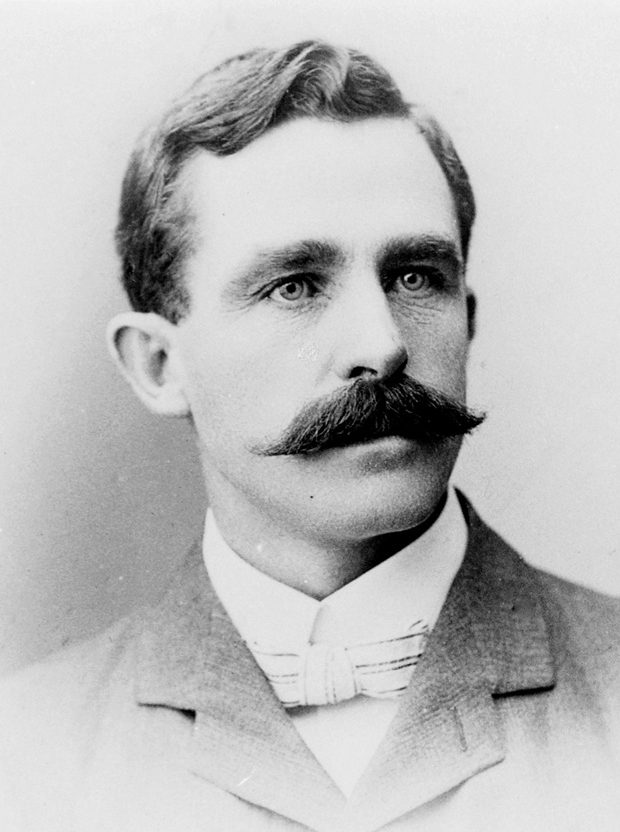
- Fichardt in 1902

Personal information
- Born: 20 March 1870; Bloemfontein, Orange Free State
- Died: 30 May 1923 (aged 53); Cape Town, Cape Province, South Africa
- Batting: Right-handed

International information
- National side: South Africa
- Test debut (cap 17): 19 March 1892 v England
- Last Test: 13 February 1896 v England

Domestic team information
- Years: Team
- 1891/92–1909/10: Orange Free State

Career statistics
Competition	Test	First-class
Matches	2	6
Runs scored	15	87
Batting average	3.75	7.25
100s/50s	0/0	0/0
Top score	10	16
Balls bowled	–	342
Wickets	–	4
Bowling average	–	60.50
5 wickets in innings	–	0
10 wickets in match	–	0
Best bowling	–	2/39
Catches/stumpings	2/–	4/–
- Source: Cricinfo, 25 April 2019

Charles Gustav Fichardt (20 March 1870 – 30 May 1923) was a South African cricketer who played in two Test matches in 1892 and 1896. He was also a Boer soldier in the Second Boer War and later a politician and a prominent advocate of Boer independence.

== Life and career ==
Fichardt was educated at Grey College, Bloemfontein, and later in Scotland and at Hamburg. A vigorous batsman and lob bowler, he represented Orange Free State from 1892 to 1909.

Fichardt made the top score in the match, 54 not out, when an Orange Free State XXII played the English team in 1892, and made his Test debut two weeks later. When the next English team visited in 1895–96 he took 6 for 93 in their first innings when they played an Orange Free State XVI. His Test contributions during these tours were less successful.

Fichardt was elected mayor of Bloemfontein in 1897. He fought for the Boers with General Piet Cronje at the Battle of Paardeberg in 1899. He was captured, but escaped. In 1906 he was one of the founders of the Orange Union Party, which advocated self-government for Orange Free State. He became editor of the Bloemfontein Friend, the newspaper of the Orange Union Party. At the Imperial Press Conference in 1909 he declared that the actions of the British had now reconciled him to the place of Orange Free State in the British Empire:

Then came a day, a wonderful day, when the conqueror with open hand approached us, holding out to us freely that inestimable thing for which we had fought – that liberty for which so many of us had died – and from that moment, I think, we were really conquered, we joined hands with you, and if ever need arises there will speak for England on the wild and lonely veldt the unerring rifle of the Boer.

He was one of the founders of the National Party in Bloemfontein in 1914. He sat in the Legislative Assembly of the Orange River Colony from 1907 to 1910, and in the Union House of Assembly (representing Ladybrand) from 1910 until his death in 1923.

Fichardt and his wife Catharine had two sons and a daughter. He died after an operation, aged 53. His brother Everard married Hannah Steyn, daughter of Martinus Theunis Steyn, the President of the Orange Free State from 1896 to 1902.
