= South African cricket team in England in 1894 =

International cricket tour

The inaugural South African cricket tour of England took place in the 1894 season.

None of the 24 matches have first-class standing, although South Africa had already begun playing matches subsequently recognised as Test matches at home and many of the matches on tour were against first-class county clubs. The South Africans won 12 matches, drew 7 and lost 5.

== The team ==
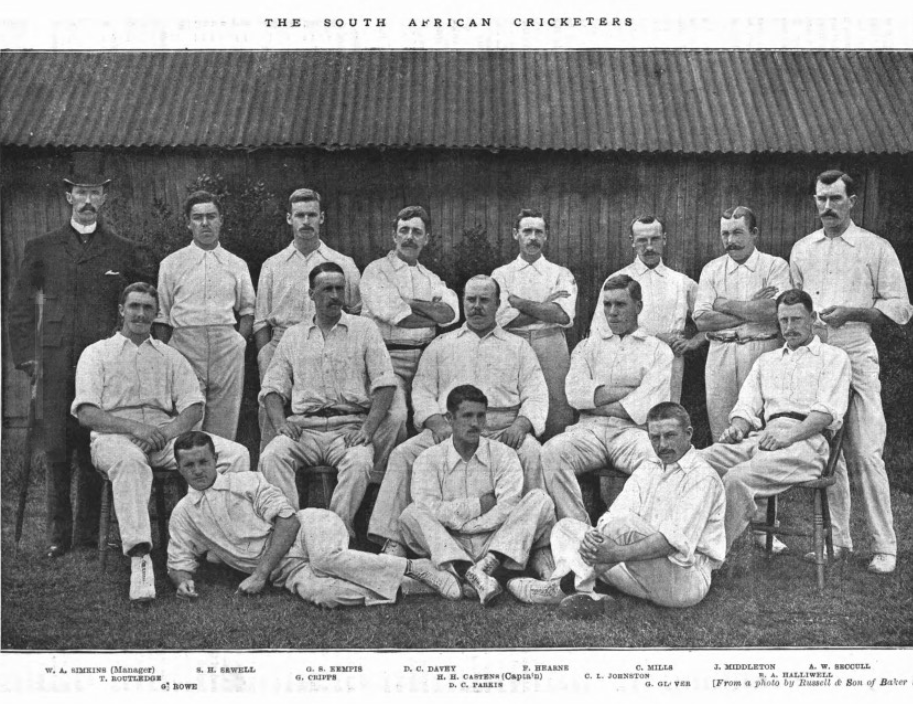
The South African team that toured England in 1894.

- H. H. Castens (captain)
- Godfrey Cripps
- Darnton Davey
- George Glover
- Ernest Halliwell
- Frank Hearne
- Clement Johnson
- George Kempis
- Bonnor Middleton
- Charles Mills
- Dante Parkin
- Thomas Routledge
- George Rowe
- Arthur Seccull
- Cyril Sewell

The manager was W. A. Simkins of Cape Town. Most of the leading players were available, except for Bernard Tancred and Alfred Richards, whose work prevented their participation. After the team was selected, Charles Mills replaced Voltelin van der Bijl.

The best-known player on the team was Frank Hearne, one of the few players to represent two countries in Test cricket. He played for England in 1888-89 and for South Africa from 1891 to 1896. Six of the team – Cripps, Halliwell, Hearne, Mills, Parkin and Routledge – had played in South Africa's most recent Test in 1892; Glover, Halliwell, Hearne, Johnson, Middleton, Routledge, Rowe and Seccull played Tests later in the 1890s. Only four – Castens, Davey, Kempis and Sewell – did not play Test cricket.

== The tour ==
An important victory came against MCC at Lord's after weather had disrupted the early weeks of the tour. Rain prevented play on the first day of the two-day match, but on the second day 40 wickets fell, and the South Africans (126 and 60) defeated MCC (103 and 72) by 11 runs. Middleton took six wickets in each innings.

Sewell was the leading scorer, with 1038 runs at an average of 30.52. He decided to stay in England and play for Gloucestershire. Rowe led the bowlers, with 136 wickets at 12.87; his opening partner Middleton took 83 wickets at 15.79.

After the tour, Simkins, the manager, declared that "from a cricket point of view" the tour was "a far greater success than the most sanguine of our team and supporters anticipated". However, financially it was "as complete a failure as it could be", and the tour's guarantors lost all their investment.

== Annual reviews ==
- James Lillywhite's Cricketers' Annual (Red Lilly), 1895
- Wisden Cricketers Almanack 1895
