= Ernest Halliwell =

Personal information
- Full name: Ernest Austin Halliwell
- Born: 7 September 1864; Ealing, Middlesex, England
- Died: 2 October 1919 (aged 55); Johannesburg, Transvaal, South Africa
- Nickname: Barberton
- Batting: Right-handed
- Role: Wicket-keeper
- Relatives: Richard Halliwell, father

International information
- National side: South Africa
- Test debut (cap 18): 19 March 1892 v England
- Last Test: 8 November 1902 v Australia

Career statistics
Competition	Test	First-class
Matches	8	60
Runs scored	188	1,702
Batting average	12.53	19.34
100s/50s	0/1	0/8
Top score	57	92
Balls bowled	0	283
Wickets	–	3
Bowling average	–	58.33
5 wickets in innings	–	0
10 wickets in match	–	0
Best bowling	–	2/49
Catches/stumpings	10/2	75/37
- Source: ESPNcricinfo, 29 April 2012

Ernest Austin "Barberton" Halliwell (7 September 1864 – 2 October 1919) was a first-class cricketer, who played eight Test matches for South Africa between 1892 and 1902, including three as captain. He played as a wicket-keeper, and was the first to put raw steaks inside his gloves to protect his hands. At his peak, he was considered one of the best wicket-keepers in the world, and was named one of the Wisden Cricketers of the Year in 1905. He was particularly praised for standing close to the wickets, even against fast bowlers.

== Life and career ==
Ernest Halliwell was born on 7 September 1864 in Ealing, Middlesex, the son of Richard Halliwell, who was a wicket-keeper for Middlesex County Cricket Club. Though he played cricket as a boy in England, his debut in notable cricket occurred when Walter Read led a touring English side around South Africa. Halliwell appeared as wicket-keeper for South Africa in a match which was retroactively granted Test cricket status. He rose to prominence two years later, when a South African team toured the British Isles. Halliwell's wicket-keeping was judged by his English peers as being among the best in the world, and he was compared in equal terms with Jack Blackham and Gregor MacGregor, the Australian and English Test wicket-keepers of the time.

When Lord Hawke led an England side to South Africa in early 1896, Halliwell captained South Africa in the first two Test matches: his side lost both games heavily, due mainly to the bowling of George Lohmann. He captained the side once again in late 1902, against Australia, and South Africa once again suffered a heavy defeat.

Upon his return to England with another touring party in 1901, Halliwell garnered yet more praise, with some describing him as "the best wicket-keeper in the world." During that tour, Halliwell still stood close to the stumps, even against the fastest bowlers that South Africa possessed. This was contrary to most wicket-keepers of the time, who had gradually started standing further and further away from the wickets to give themselves more time to react to take catches. At the end of the 1901 tour, Halliwell played three additional matches. He played one match for London County, before appearing for his county of birth, Middlesex, in a county match against Essex. In this match, he took two catches and a stumping, all off the bowling of J. T. Hearne, and according to Wisden, he "was seen at quite his best". His final match in England that year was for the amateur Gentlemen in one of their matches against the professional Players, at the Central Recreation Ground in Hastings.

To protect his hands, Halliwell put raw steak inside his gloves, something he was the first wicket-keeper to do. After the South African tour of 1904, Halliwell was named one of the Wisden Cricketers of the Year. He did not appear again for South Africa after that 1904 tour, considered by some to be a "veteran who had had his day". He was considered a useful batsman, and his highest score was 92 runs, made against Somerset in 1901.

Halliwell died at Johannesburg in October 1919 aged 55, after an operation for gangrene of the leg.

Preceded by William Henry Milton	South African national cricket captain 1895/6-1902/3	Succeeded by Alfred Richards
