= List of Northern Cape representative cricketers =

This is a partial list of cricketers who have played first-class, List A cricket, or Twenty20 cricket for Griqualand West and Northern Cape in South Africa. The team was renamed ahead of the 2015–16 season following the creation of Northern Cape province in 1994.

The Kimberley team that played matches during the 1880s played four matches which are considered first-class between 1889–90 and 1890–91, (Note: The 1889–90 season is the first in South Africa to include domestic first-class matches. Two Test matches played the previous season between South Africa and a touring English team are considered the first matches played in South Africa to have first-class status.) including the first two Currie Cup matches against Transvaal. (Note: Kimberley won the Currie Cup, which was a single match played against Transvaal, in 1890–91.) The name Griqualand West was first used in the 1890–91 Champion Bat tournament, and from 1892 to 1893 the team played under that name in the Currie Cup. Its matches in the competition are considered first-class from this date. The Griqualand West B team played six matches in he 1998–99 UCB Bowl which are also considered first-class. (Note: The UCB Bowl was the continuation of the B section of the Currie Cup which had first been played in the 1950s. The 1998–99 competition was the final time that matches played by B teams have first-class status.)

Griqualand West first played List A cricket in 1970–71, the first season of provincial List A cricket in South Africa, (Note: The 1969–70 Gillette Cup competition had taken place the previous season, but teams did not use their provincial names. The team that represented Griqualand West was organised by Brian Burrow and known as BW Burrow's XI. It played one match. All 11 players who appeared for this team also played matches for Griqualand West so, by default, appear on this list.) and domestic Twenty20 cricket in the first season of the CSA Provincial T20 in 2011–12.

This list includes the players who played first-class and List A cricket for Kimberley between 1889–90 and 1890–91, Griqualand West between 1890–91 and 2014–15, Griqualand West B in 1998–99, and Northern Cape from 2015–16 to the present day. It does not include players who appeared only for franchise team Knights which was operated by the Free State and Griqualand West Cricket Unions between 2005–06 and 2020–21. (Note: Knights was known as Eagles between 2003–04 and 2009–10. The players who played for the franchise are listed at List of Knights cricketers. Griqualand West initially refused to join the franchise, with the 2003–04 and 2004–05 seasons operated by Free State alone.)

== A ==
- Glen Abbott
- Gerhardt Abrahams
- Zahir Abrahim
- Roy Adams
- Mickey Arthur

== B ==
- Ottniel Baartman
- David Bairstow
- Xen Balaskas
- Pieter Barnard
- Edward Beech
- Warren Bell
- George Bissett
- Ernest Bock
- Tumelo Bodibe
- Loots Bosman
- Andre Botha
- Bill Brockwell
- Aidan Brooker
- Kenneth Brown
- Henderson Bryan
- Mbulelo Budaza
- Edward Budgen
- Cloete Buitendag
- Jaco Burger

== C ==
- Dave Callaghan
- Mike Cann
- Deon Carolus
- James Carse
- Graham Charlesworth
- Gert Cloete
- John Cochran
- Werner Coetsee
- Jandre Coetzee
- John Coghlan
- Mick Commaille
- Alfred Cooper
- Frans Cronje

== D ==
- Donald Davidson
- Riel de Kock
- Desmond de Koker
- Mike Doherty
- Corbyn Dolley
- Errol Draper
- Ronald Draper
- Garnet Driver
- Corné Dry

== E ==
- Grant Elliott
- Cedric English

== F ==
- Francis Farrelly
- Charlie Finlason
- Mark Ford
- Clyde Fortuin
- Cyril Francois
- Jan Frylinck
- Vivian Furmidge
- James Furstenburg

== G ==
- Ottis Gibson
- Martyn Gidley
- George Glover
- Irvine Grimmer

== H ==
- Tony Harris
- Benjamin Hector
- Basil Helfrich
- Cyril Helfrich
- Dudley Helfrich
- Kenneth Helfrich
- Reeza Hendricks
- Bob Herman
- Ronald Hewat
- Anthony Hobson
- Rudolph Howe

== J ==
- Rhyno Janse van Rensburg
- Trevor Jesty
- Giovanni Joseph

== K ==
- Zakir Kathrada
- Collin Kelbrick
- Henry Kelly (cricketer)
- Paul Kirsten
- Karl Krikken
- Alan Kruger
- Patrick Kruger
- Akhona Kula

== L ==
- Donald Lee
- Gerhardus Liebenberg
- William Ling
- Andrew Louw
- Johann Louw
- Lennie Louw

== M ==
- Themba Maupa
- Craig Marais
- Colin Maritz
- Mandla Mashimbyi
- Russell Mawhinney
- Alberto Mazzoncini
- Adrian McLaren
- Marcelle Michau
- Charles Mills
- Avumile Mnci
- Thandolwethu Mnyaka
- Kagiso Mohale
- Grant Mokoena
- Tebogo Mokwena
- Andy Moles
- Alan Morris
- John Morris
- Orapeleng Motlhoaring
- Roger Moult
- Martyn Moxon
- Ayavuya Myoli

== N ==
- Frank Nicholson
- Mtabozuko Nqam

== O ==
- John Ogilvie (South African cricketer)

== P ==
- Hugh Page
- Edward Parker
- Dante Parkin
- Gordon Parsons
- Leroy Phillips
- Keegan Petersen
- Charl Pietersen
- Revelation Plaatjie
- Laurie Potter
- Albert Powell
- Jackie Powell
- Mike Powell
- Dewald Pretorius
- Henry Promnitz

== Q ==
- Willie Quaife
- Neville Quinn

== R ==
- Nobbie Ralph
- Masilo Ramothata
- Reginald Richter
- Douglas Riemer
- Lonwabo Rodolo
- Garth Roe
- Paul Romaines
- Graham Roope
- Albert Rose-Innes
- Diego Rosier
- Charles Rutherfoord

== S ==
- Kenneth Saggers
- Farhaan Sayanvala
- Des Schonegevel
- Blake Schraader
- Russell Searle
- Arthur Seccull
- Bennett Sekonyela
- Letlotlo Sesele
- Shahid Afridi
- William Shalders
- Kevin Sharp
- Martinus Smit
- Greg Smith
- Bob Snedden
- Jacques Snyman
- Rudi Steyn
- Peter Stopforth
- Sarel Strauss
- Aubrey Swanepoel
- Frederick Swarbrook
- Zandrè Swartz
- Pat Symcox

== T ==
- Bernard Tancred
- George Tapscott
- Lionel Tapscott
- Garnett Tarr
- Derek Taylor (cricketer)
- Michael Tramontino
- Tristan Traugott
- JP Triegaardt
- Brett Tucker

== V ==
- Chubb Vigne
- Andre van Troost
- Ken Viljoen

== W ==
- John Waddington
- Vaughn Walsh
- Irving Washington
- Arthur Weakley
- Sidney Webb
- Kepler Wessels
- James Whitehead
- Reece Williams
- John Wood
- Walter Woodthorpe
