= 1889–90 Currie Cup =

Cricket tournament in South Africa

- Cricket format: First-class cricket (3 days)
- Tournament format: Single match
- Champions: Transvaal (1st title)
- Participants: 2
- Matches: 1
- Most runs: Monty Bowden (189 for Transvaal)
- Most wickets: Aubrey Smith (7 for Transvaal)

The 1889–90 Currie Cup was the inaugural edition of the Currie Cup, the premier first-class cricket tournament in South Africa. The 1889–90 competition involved just two teams, Transvaal and Kimberley. The two sides played a single, three-day match, which was won by Transvaal by six wickets.

Both sides made low scores in their first innings; Kimberley, who had opted to bat first, were dismissed for 98 runs, and in their reply Transvaal reached 117, a lead of just 19 runs. In the second innings, they both fared better; a century from Bernard Tancred helped Kimberley to a total of 235, but Transvaal reached their total in 38 five-ball overs, helped by a century from Monty Bowden.

== Background ==
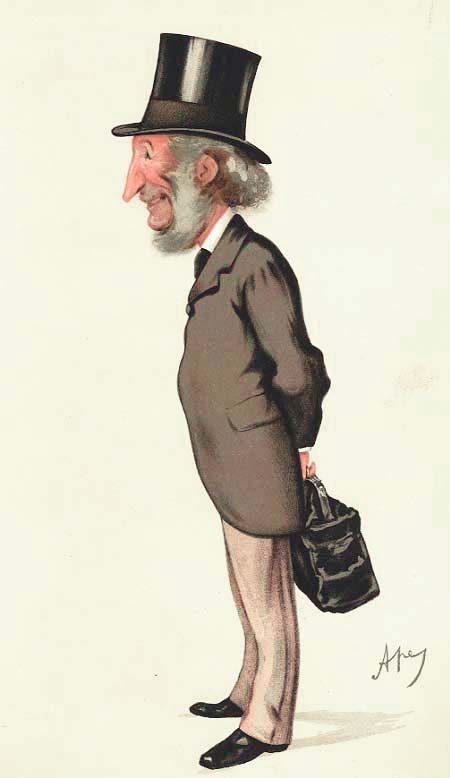
Sir Donald Currie donated the Currie Cup, to be awarded to the best first-class side in South Africa.

First-class cricket was first played in South Africa in the previous 1888–89 season, when Robert Warton managed a side which toured the country, playing against representative teams from each of the provinces, and two matches against South Africa, which were later adjudged to have Test cricket status. During that tour, Donald Currie donated the Currie Cup to be awarded to the team which performed best against the touring side; which was judged to be Kimberley. In other first-class matches during the 1889–90 season, Kimberley faced Natal twice, winning both matches. Transvaal did not play any first-class cricket prior to their Currie Cup contest with Kimberley.

Transvaal challenged Kimberley for the Currie Cup in 1890, the first such challenge for the trophy. A number of the team selections were controversial: the selection committee for Transvaal chose Aubrey Smith and Monty Bowden, both of whom had remained in South Africa after touring as part of the England cricket team the previous year, and Charlie Finlason, who played the majority of his cricket for the opposition Kimberley team. Finlason, a newspaper journalist, had fallen out with Smith after writing a number of articles criticising him and the English side. When Finlason was selected for Transvaal, Smith—who was captaining the side—made him bat at number eleven.

== Match ==
=== Summary ===
The match began on Saturday 5 April 1890 at the Eclectics Cricket Club Ground in Kimberley. The toss was won by the Kimberley captain, Walter Woodthorpe, who opted to bat first. Bernard Tancred and Robert Snedden opened the batting, and scored 25 runs together before the first wicket fell. The Transvaal bowlers took three more wickets for the addition of just 27 runs, leaving Kimberley on 52 for 4. The batsmen then shared a partnership of 40 runs, but upon the loss of the next wicket, Kimberley suffered a collapse, and were eventually bowled out for 98 runs. Tancred top-scored for the side, accruing 42 runs, but only two other batsmen reached double figures; Snedden and John Coghlan, both of whom scored 13. Transvaal only used three bowlers during the innings; Aubrey Smith and Bentley Wimble each took four wickets, while Charles Vintcent took the remaining two.

Transvaal began their reply strongly; their openers, Monty Bowden and John Hickson put on 69 runs for the first wicket, the majority being scored by Bowden. Once they lost their first wicket, the team continued to lose wickets at regular intervals; the second-highest partnership of the innings was the 17 runs made for the tenth, or last, wicket. George Glover was the best of the bowlers, collecting six wickets. Glover and Albert Rose-Innes bowled the majority of the overs, and took nine of the wickets between them. Bowden's score of 63 was substantially the best by any batsman in the innings, only John Piton, Spranger Harrison and Hickson scored more than 10 runs, and none managed as many as 20.

The third innings of the match gave Kimberley a second attempt at batting on the first day; they lost wickets regularly through the afternoon, but opener Tancred remained at the crease throughout, finishing the day unbeaten on 55, with the team on 100 for six. The match resumed on Monday 7 April 1890, with no play scheduled for the Sunday. After the early loss of Rose-Innes for 20 runs, Charles Rutherfoord joined Tancred. The pair scored 97 runs together, taking the score up to 226. Three quick wickets then ended the Kimberley innings; they scored 235 runs from 83 overs, in which Tancred scored a century, hitting 106 runs before being leg before wicket to Bowden. Vintcent took the most wickets for Transvaal, claiming four for 70. Smith claimed two wickets, and Bowden, who was designed on the scorecard as the team's wicket-keeper also claimed two wickets from the three overs that he bowled.

Transvaal batted rapidly in their second innings, reaching the required total to win the match inside the second day of the match, which had been scheduled for three days in total. Opening batsman Bowden batted throughout the whole innings, remaining not out on 126 when his side won the match. He was joined at the end by Vintcent, who scored 60 runs in a partnership of 126 runs between the two players. Kimberley tried six different bowlers in an effort to bowl Transvaal out, but only Rose-Innes and Irvine Grimmer took wickets, claiming two apiece.

=== Scorecard ===
Kimberley batting innings
	First innings		Second innings	
Batsman	Method of dismissal	Runs	Method of dismissal	Runs
Bernard Tancred	b Wimble	42	lbw Bowden	106
Robert Snedden	b Vintcent	13	hit wkt Vintcent	4
Arthur Seccull	b Smith	5	b Smith	1
Irvine Grimmer	st Bowden b Vintcent	5	c Newby b Vintcent	12
Rudolph Howe	b Smith	9	b Vintcent	0
John Coghlan	b Smith	13	c Newby b Smith	5
Edward Beech	c Harrison b Wimble	5	st Bowden b Wimble	9
George Glover	b Wimble	1	b Smith	0
Charles Rutherfoord †	b Smith	0	c Smith b Bowden	55
Albert Rose-Innes	not out	0	c Piton b Vintcent	20
Walter Woodthorpe *	b Wimble	0	not out	1
Extras	5 byes	5	14 byes, 8 leg byes	22
Totals	44.4 overs	98	83 overs	235

Transvaal bowling innings
	First innings				Second innings			
Bowler	Overs	Maidens	Runs	Wickets	Overs	Maidens	Runs	Wickets
Charles Vintcent	19	3	49	2	33	11	70	4
Aubrey Smith	21	6	36	4	29	9	61	3
Bentley Wimble	4.4	2	8	4	10	1	45	1
Charlie Finlason	–	–	–	–	5	0	22	0
William Newby	–	–	–	–	3	0	8	0
Monty Bowden	–	–	–	–	3	0	7	2

Transvaal batting innings
	First innings		Second innings	
Batsman	Method of dismissal	Runs	Method of dismissal	Runs
Monty Bowden †	b Glover	63	not out	126
John Hickson	b Glover	11	c Robert Snedden b Albert Rose-Innes	0
Thomas Dixon	c and b Albert Rose-Innes	0	b Grimmer	1
Charles Vintcent	b Albert Rose-Innes	2	not out	60
William Newby	run out	2		
Spranger Harrison	c Seccull b Glover	11	c and b Albert Rose-Innes	9
Aubrey Smith *	c and b Albert Rose-Innes	0	c Robert Snedden b Grimmer	18
Herbert Mosenthal	b Glover	5		
Bentley Wimble	b Glover	4		
John Piton	not out	14		
Charlie Finlason	b Glover	2		
Extras	3 byes	3	8 byes, 1 leg bye, 1 wide	
Totals	42.3 overs	117	38 overs	224/4

Kimberley bowling innings
	First innings				Second innings			
Bowler	Overs	Maidens	Runs	Wickets	Overs	Maidens	Runs	Wickets
Irvine Grimmer	3	0	19	0	9	0	51	2
Arthur Seccull	3	0	15	0	1	0	3	0
Albert Rose-Innes	18	6	30	3	15	0	68	2
George Glover	18.3	7	50	6	9	1	72	0
Bernard Tancred	–	–	–	–	3	0	15	0
Edward Beech	–	–	–	–	1	0	5	0

Key

- * – Captain
- † – Wicket-keeper
- c Fielder – Indicates that the batsman was dismissed by a catch by the named fielder
- b Bowler – Indicates which bowler gains credit for the dismissal
- lbw – Indicates the batsman was dismissed leg before wicket
- ht wkt – Indicates the batsman was dismissed hit wicket
- st – Indicates the batsman was stumped

== Aftermath ==
Transvaal and Kimberley remained the only sides to contest the Currie Cup in the following season, and in their 1891 match, Kimberley won by 58 runs in a timeless match. The tournament was not played in 1891–92, but when it restarted the following year, a third team, Western Province joined, while Kimberley were renamed Griqualand West.
