= Helfrich =

Helfrich is both a surname and a given name. Notable people with the name include:

Surname:

- The Helfrich family of South African cricketers:
  - Dudley Helfrich (1912–1980)
  - Basil Helfrich (1919–1938)
  - Cyril Helfrich (1924–2002)
  - Kenneth Helfrich (1927–1982)
- Anke Helfrich (born 1966), German jazz pianist and composer
- Conrad Emil Lambert Helfrich (1886–1962), Dutch admiral
- Jeff Helfrich (born 1967/68), American politician
- John Helfrich (1795–1852), American pastor and homeopath
- Karl Helfrich, American physical oceanographer
- Mark Helfrich (disambiguation), multiple people
- Theo Helfrich (1913–1978), German racing driver
- Ty Helfrich (1890–1955), American baseball player
- Wolfgang Helfrich (1932–2025), German physicist

Given name:

- Helfrich Bernhard Wenck (1739–1803), German historian and educator
- Johann Helfrich von Müller (1746–1830), German engineer
