= Budgen =

Budgen is a surname. Notable people with the surname include:

- Chris Budgen (born 1973), New Zealand rugby union player
- Edward Budgen (1884–1962), South African cricketer
- Frank Budgen (1882–1971), English painter
- Frank Budgen (director) (1954–2015), English commercial director
- Henry Budgen (1865–1929), English cricketer
- John Budgen founder of Budgens supermarkets in Notting Hill, London
- Nicholas Budgen (1937–1998), English politician
- Tom Budgen (born 1985), Dutch professional wrestler better known as Aleister Black
