= Vintcent =

Vintcent is a surname. Notable people with the surname include:

- Charles Vintcent (1866–1943), South African cricketer
- Nevill Vintcent (1902–1942), South African aviator
- Vintcent van der Bijl (born 1948), South African cricketer

== See also ==
- Vincent
