= Michael Doherty =

Michael Doherty may refer to:

== Sports ==
- Michael Doherty (footballer) (born 1990), Scottish footballer
- Mike Doherty (cricketer) (born 1947), South African cricketer
- Mike Doherty (footballer) (born 1961), English footballer

== Others ==
- Michael Doherty (Irish politician) (1933–2011), Irish Fianna Fáil politician
- Michael F. Doherty (born 1951), British chemical engineer
- Michael J. Doherty (born 1963), American politician, member of the New Jersey Senate
- Michael Doherty (legal scholar), professor of law

== See also ==
- Michael O'Doherty (disambiguation)
- Michael Doherty White, U.S. Representative
- Mick Docherty (born 1950), English former footballer and trainer
- Mike Docherty (1955–2016), Scottish comic book and animation artist
