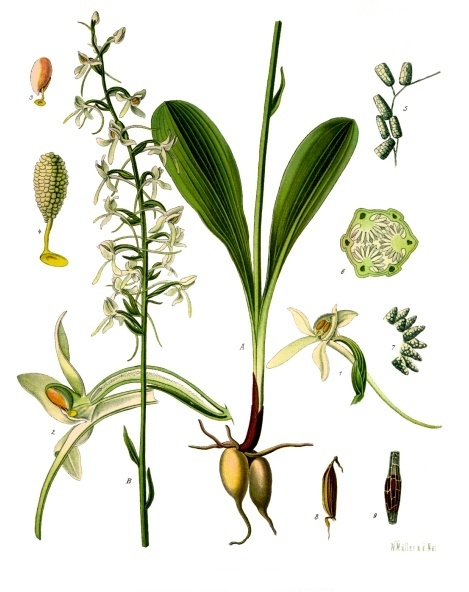

Conservation status
- Least Concern (IUCN 3.1) (Europe regional assessment)
- CITES Appendix II

Scientific classification
- Kingdom: Plantae
- Clade: Tracheophytes
- Clade: Angiosperms
- Clade: Monocots
- Order: Asparagales
- Family: Orchidaceae
- Subfamily: Orchidoideae
- Genus: Platanthera
- Species: P. bifolia

Binomial name
- Platanthera bifolia (L.) L.C.Rich.

Synonyms
- Orchis bifolia L. (basionym); Lysias bifolia (L.) Salisb.; Habenaria bifolia (L.) R.Br.; Sieberia bifolia (L.) Spreng.; Satyrium bifolium (L.) Wahlenb.; Gymnadenia bifolia (L.) G.Mey.; Platanthera solstitialis Boenn. ex Rchb.; Platanthera bifolia ssp. atropatanica B.Baumann & al.

= Platanthera bifolia =

Lesser butterfly-orchid

Species of orchid

Platanthera bifolia, commonly known as the lesser butterfly-orchid, is a species of flowering plant in the family Orchidaceae, related to the genus Orchis, where it was previously included and also with the genus Habenaria. It is a Palaearctic species occurring from Ireland in the west, across Europe and Asia to Korea and Japan. It is also found in North Africa. The name Platanthera is derived from Greek, meaning 'broad anthers', while the species name, bifolia, means 'two leaves'.

== Identification ==
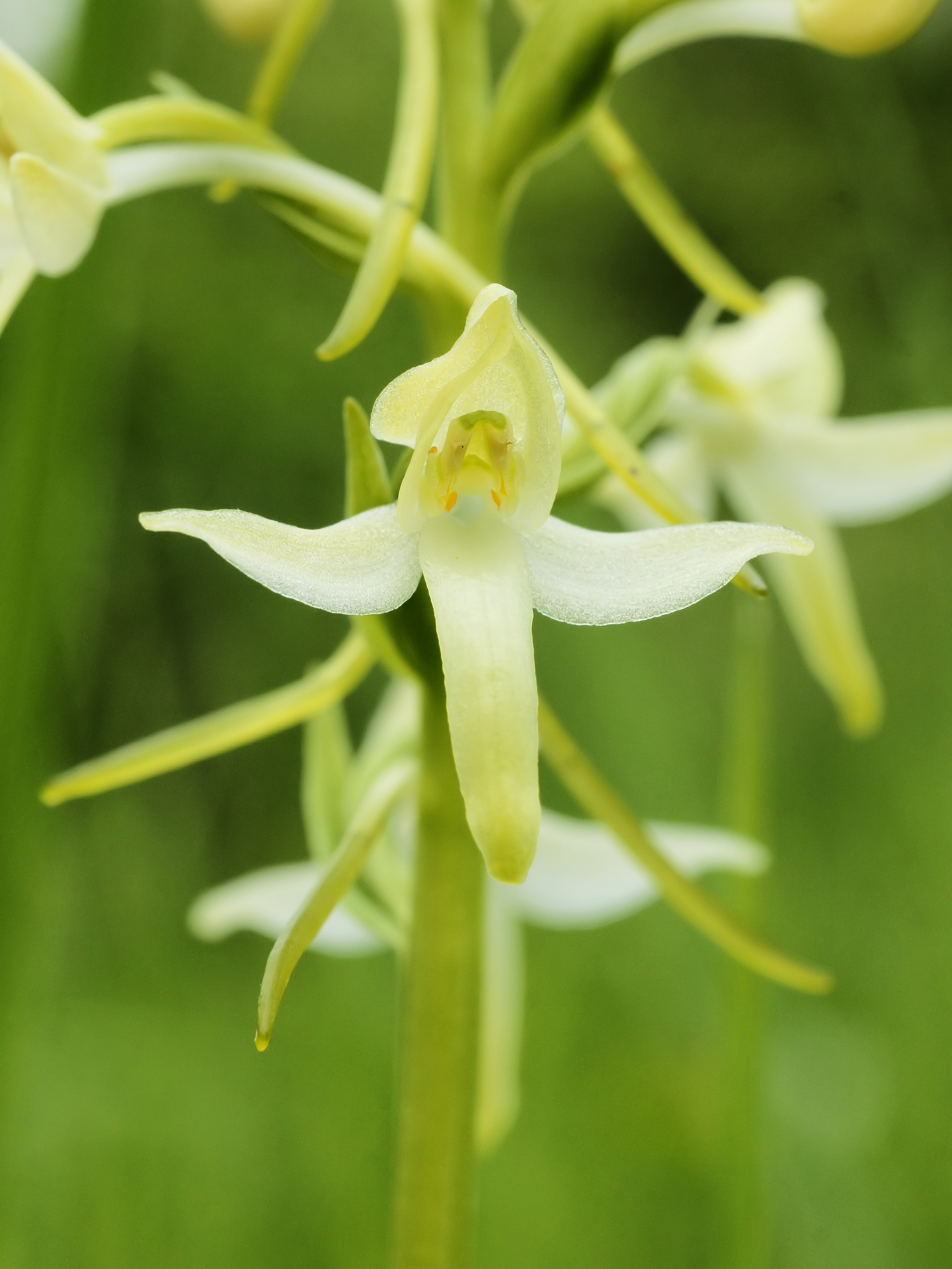
Platanthera bifolia, flower showing the parallel pollinia

Lesser butterfly-orchids are not to be confused with the greater butterfly-orchid, which are about the same size. Lesser butterfly-orchids are distinguished by their two shining green basal leaves, especially of the hill form, which are shorter and broader and by the angle of the pollinia. The upper sepal and petals form a loose triangular hood above the pollinia, which lie parallel and close together, obscuring the opening into the spur, which is long and almost straight. There are usually around 25 white flowers tinged with yellow-green in a slim flower spike. The flowers are night-scented, but the chemical components of the scent are different from those of greater butterfly-orchid and attract different pollinators.

== Hybrids ==
Hybrids of the two butterfly-orchids are rare, as are those between lesser butterfly-orchid and other species. However, hybrids have been recorded with frog orchid in South Uist (1949) and with the common spotted-orchid and the heath spotted-orchid.

== Habitat ==
The lesser butterfly-orchid occupies a wide range of habitats, being far more tolerant of acid conditions than the greater butterfly-orchid. They are found in grasslands, woodlands (especially beech woods in southern England), in hill pastures up to 400m, on heaths and moorland, and in tussocky marshy ground.

== Pollination ==
Sphingid moths are attracted by the scent of this orchid, and tend to hover in front of the flowers, resting their forelegs on the lip. As the proboscis enters the spur it pushes between the pollinia, dislodging the sticky discs which adhere to it. Pollinators include pine, small elephant and, to a lesser extent, elephant hawk-moths.

== Conservation ==
This species has suffered a serious decline, especially in central and southern England, as a result of woodland clearance. Upland populations in the north and west have suffered from overgrazing.
