= Robert Gleason =

Robert Gleason may refer to:

- Robert Gleason (politician) (fl. 1950s–2020s), American businessman who chaired the Pennsylvania Republican Party
- Robert Gleason (murderer) (1970–2013), American serial killer

== See also ==
- Robert Gleeson (1873–1919), South African cricketer
- Roberto Albores Gleason (born 1979), Mexican politician
