= Clemens Maria Franz von Bönninghausen =

Physician, botanist and pioneer in the field of homeopathy (1785–1864)

Clemens von Bönninghausen
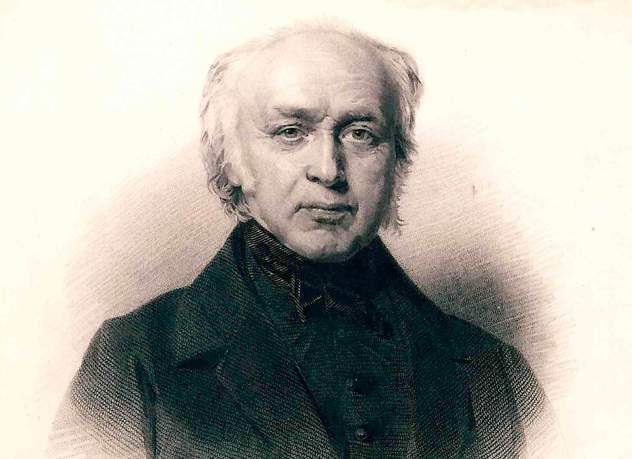
- Born: 12 March 1785; Fleringen, Dutch Republic
- Died: 26 January 1864 (aged 78); Münster, German Confederation
- Scientific career
- Fields: Homeopathy, botany, agriculture, law
- Author abbrev. (botany): Boenn.

Clemens Maria Franz (Friedrich) Freiherr (Baron) von Bönninghausen (Herinckhave near Fleringen, 12 March 1785 – Münster, 26 January 1864) was a lawyer, Dutch and Prussian civil servant, agriculturalist, botanist, physician and pioneer in the field of homeopathy.

He was decorated as Knight in the Légion d'honneur.

== Life ==
Von Bönninghausen was born on the estate Herinckhave near Fleringen in the province of Overijssel in the Netherlands as descendant of an old titled family. His father was Lodewijk Ernst von Bönninghausen, representative of the people from Overijssel, officer and chamberlain of the Prince-Bishop from Köln. His mother was Theresia von Weichs zur Wenne. He attended the Gymnasium Paulinum in Münster, studied law at the University of Groningen and graduated on Roman and old-Dutch law in 1806.

Von Bönninghausen held various positions, including auditor and privy council of the King, general secretary of the taxes, Royal Librarian, treasurer of the pensions and head of the Topographical Institutes. All in service of Louis Napoleon Bonaparte, King of Holland, till his abdication in 1810. Von Bönninghausen was shocked by the forced departure of his extremely kind and benevolent master and he refused all further employment. He returned to his native ground and accepted the position of president at the court in Almelo. At that time he married first with Franziska Sofia von Schade zu Ahausen and after her death with Amalia von Hamm.

=== Further career ===
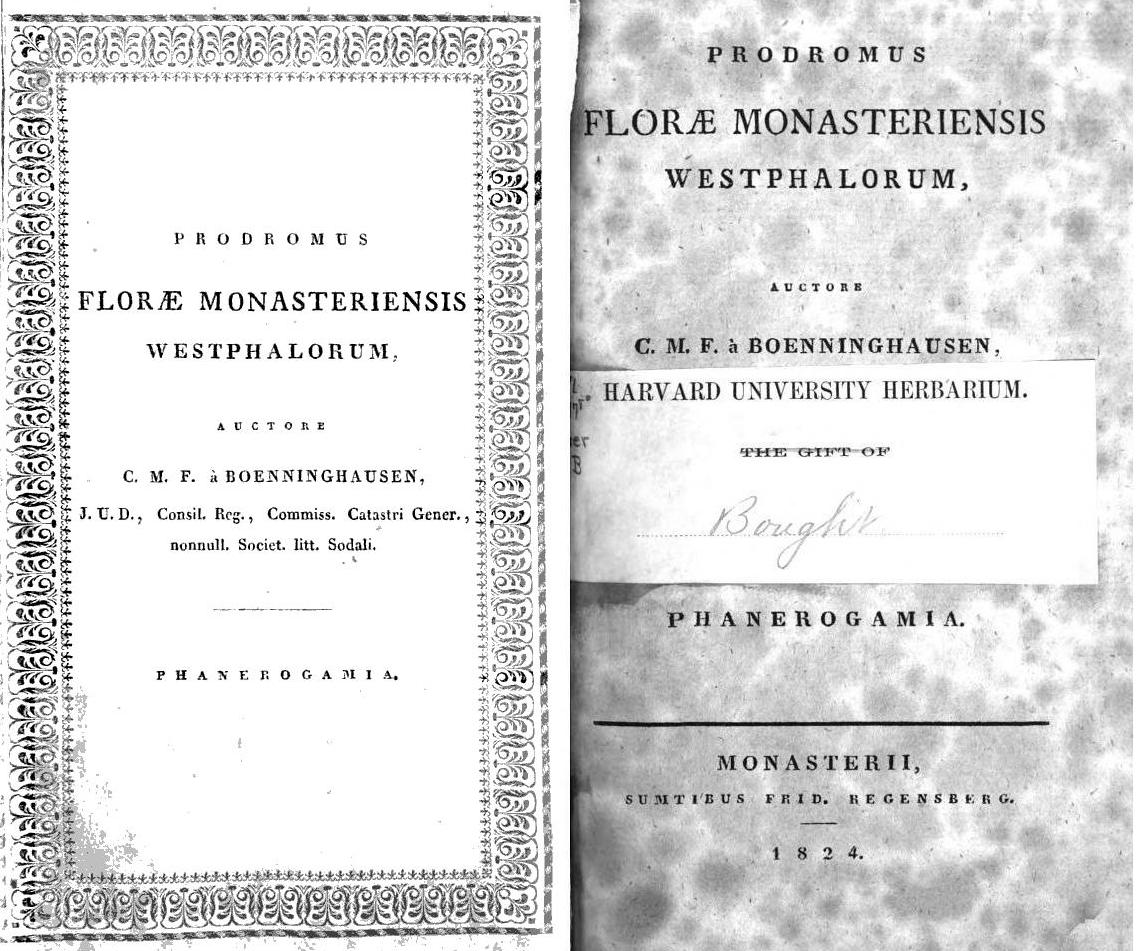
Title page of 1824 from the university library of Harvard

When his father died in 1812 von Bönninghausen moved to his family estate in Darup, just across the border in Kreis Coesfeld, Prussia. He graduated as architect and devoted himself to the study of medicine, agriculture and botany. He published numerous articles about his experiences and discoveries, which resulted in international fame. In 1816, at the reorganization of the provinces Rhineland and Westphalia, he was appointed as president of the Court of Justice and General Commissaries of the land register of North Rhine-Westphalia. The many travels with this position gave him an excellent opportunity to study the flora and he published a book about it, named: Prodromus florae Monasteriensis Westphalorum, Phanerogamia.

The very same year King Frederick William III of Prussia appointed him as first commissary at the Council of Kreis Coesfeld. Von Bönninghausen was founder and head of the medical society in North Rhine-Westphalia. He was appointed head of the Botanical Gardens in Münster from 1826 till 1845 and taught at what would later become the University of Münster. He also led the constitutional commission of experts in the investigation of the nun Anne Catherine Emmerick. They concluded that her wounds were mechanically inflicted and not supernatural. However, her beatification in 2004 by Paus Johannes Paulus II was based on a supernatural origin.

=== Sickness and recovery ===
In 1827, Bönninghausen contracted tuberculosis, followed by an intractable lung disease. Certain that he was about to die, he began writing farewell letters to his friends. One of them, friend and fellow botanist Carl Ernst August Weihe, urged him to use the herb Pulsatilla, believed to be the cure of his ailment. Von Bönninghausen was cured, and thus became a convert to the new therapy. In less than two years he wrote seven extensive works.

He became a close associate and confidant of his teacher Samuel Hahnemann, founder of the homeopathy, who admired Bönninghausen's ability to systematize the expanding homeopathic knowledge of materia medica. Hahnemann was so enthusiastic that he called him his Lieblingsschüler (Favourite student). He said: "Am I to become sick myself, then I would trust no other physician in the world, except for him."

=== Scientific career ===
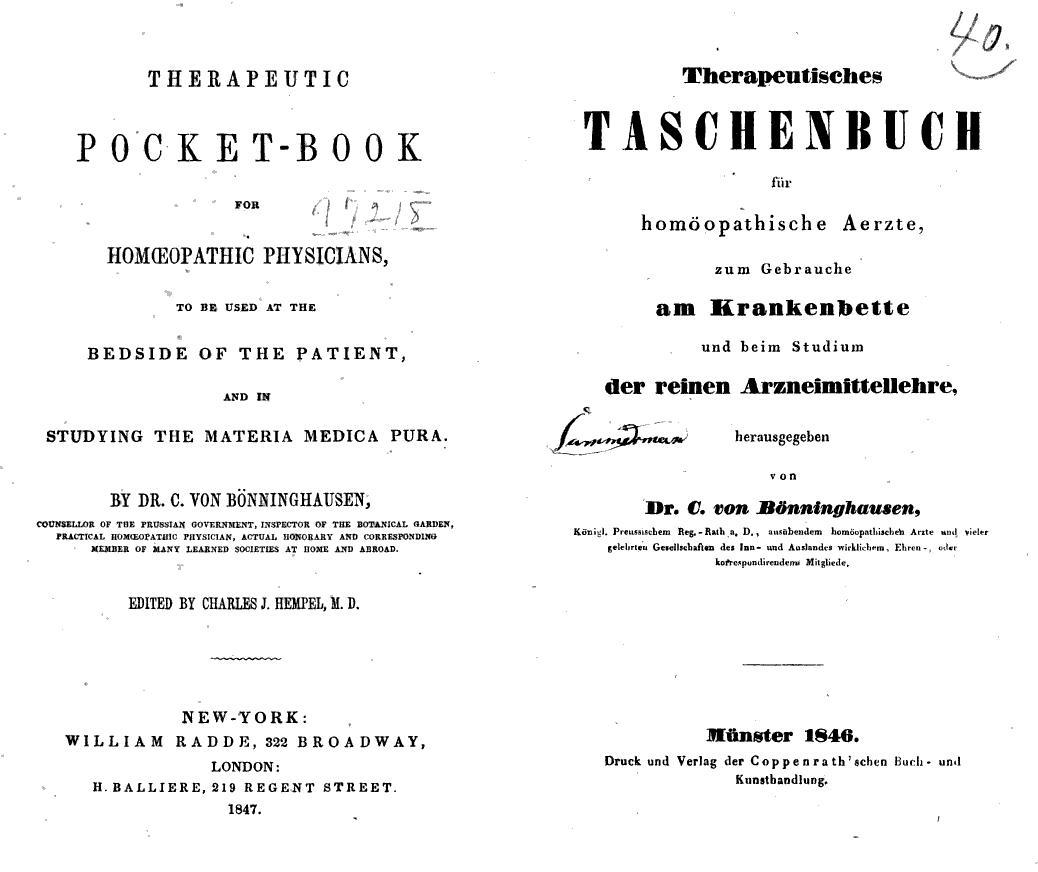
Title page of the English (1847) and German (1846) edition from the university library of Michigan.

Bönninghausen's Therapeutic Pocketbook of 1846 was the first homeopathic repertory to grade individual remedies by their strength of relationship with each symptom, and each other. This so-called von Bönninghausen (or von Boenninghausen)-method has remained in use until the present day. He proposed that disparate symptoms associated with a remedy could be grouped as a single overarching tendency, hence the importance of generalities and modalities in his system of case analysis. His method was sometimes misunderstood by later homeopaths such as C. Hering and J.T. Kent. However, recent translations and revisions point to a revival of interest in Bönninghausen's approach. An early advocate of high potencies, he conducted a successful prospective trial of 200C in domestic animals and livestock, reasoning that veterinary homeopathy was harder to dismiss as a placebo effect.

Because of his own miraculous healing and thanks to his public fame the people massively sought well-being at the doctor. Practising homeopathy successfully on a small scale without a medical degree, fascinated and ultimately led to von Bönninghausen receiving a medical licence by personal royal degree from Frederick William IV, King of Prussia in 1843. This made him a doctor and ensured that he could effectively treat patients.

Among his growing international clientele, he saw some notable patients. One of the first was the poet Annette von Droste-Hülshoff. She was cured of tuberculosis. Also among them was the French Empress Eugénie de Montijo, wife of Napoleon III. In 1854 von Bönninghausen received an honorary degree from the Medical College in Cleveland (North America). And in 1861 the French Emperor Napoleon III decorated him as Knight in the Légion d'honneur.

The standard author abbreviation Boenn. is used to indicate von Bönninghausen as the author when citing a botanical name. A list of plants discovered by him can be found in the IPNI.

=== Descendants ===
The two oldest of his seven sons became a homeopath as well. Karl von Bönninghausen, the eldest, went to Paris where he had access to the private library and manuscripts of Hahnemann and married Sophie, the adopted daughter of Melanie Hahnemann (Hahnemann's widow).

=== Post mortem ===
His grave on the old Hörster graveyard in Münster was destroyed in a bombardment during the Second World War. Nowadays the scholar is being remembered at this very place with a sandstone monument displaying a picture of the baron. Also, several streets and plants are named after him, like the Boenninghausenia altiflora, Boeninghausia vincentina and a genus of the Rutaceae, Boenninghausenia.

In 1990 the Clemens von Bönninghausen Academy was founded, and in 2009 the Von Bönninghausen Institute. A memorial to von Bönninghausen was installed in 2005 at the University of Münster, on the celebration of the 250th birthday of Samuel Hahnemann's birth.

== Publications ==
A small selection of his works:

- Prodromus florae Monasteriensis Westphalorum, Phanerogamia., Monasterii, F. Regensberg, 1824.
- The Cure of Cholera and its Preventatives, Münster, 1831.
- Systematisch-alphabetisches Repertorium der homöopathischen Arzneien, Vol. 1&2 . Münster, Coppenrath, 1833-1835 Digital edition by the University and State Library Düsseldorf
- Beiträge zur Kenntniss der Eigenthümlichkeien aller bisher vollständiger geprüften homöopathischen Arzneien [Contributions to a Knowledge of the Peculiarities of Homoeopathic Remedies], Münster, 1833 Digital edition by the University and State Library Düsseldorf
- Repertory of the Medicines which are not Anti Psoric, Münster 1835
- Therapeutisches Taschenbuch, für homöopathische Ärzte, zum Gebrauche am Krankenbette und beim Studium der reinen Arzneimittellehre [Therapeutic Pocketbook, For Homeopathic Physicians, for the Use at the Sickbed and For the Study of the Pure Materia Medica], Münster, 1846.
- Der homöopathische Hausarzt [The Hom. Domestic Physician in Brief Therapeutic Diagnoses], Münster, 1853.
- Die Körperseiten und Verwandtschaften [The Two Sides of the Human Body and Relationships. Homoeopathic Studies], Münster 1853.
- Die homöopathische Behandlung des Keuchhustens [The Homœopathic Treatment of Whooping Cough in its Various Forms], Münster 1860.
- Die Aphorismen des Hippokrates [The Aphorisms of Hippocrates, with Notes by a Homoeopath], Leipzig, 1863
- Versuch einer Homöopathischen Therapie der Wechsel- und anderer Fieber. 1. Theil. Die Pyrexie. 2. Aufl [Attempt at a homoeopathic Therapy of Intermittent and Other Fevers, Second augmented and l revised edition. Part 1. The Pyrexy.], – Leipzig 1864
- Archiv für die homöopatische Heilkunst [Archive for the Homeopathy], Münster
- Über die Twentische Roggenwirtschaft [About the rye economy of Twente]
