= English cricket team in South Africa in 1895–96 =

International cricket tour

	South Africa	England
- Dates: 13 February – 26 March 1896
Captains	EA Halliwell (1st & 2nd Tests); AR Richards (3rd Test)	TC O'Brien (1st Test); MB Hawke (2nd & 3rd Tests)

Test series
- Result: England won the 3-match series 3–0
Most runs	EA Halliwell (104)	AJL Hill (251)
Most wickets	J Middleton (12)	GA Lohmann (35)

An English cricket team, organised and led by Lord Hawke, toured South Africa from December 1895 to March 1896. The team played three matches against the South Africa national cricket team which were retrospectively awarded Test status. There is uncertainty about the status of South African cricket as a whole in the late nineteenth century and so only two of Hawke's matches against provincial teams, those involving Transvaal and Western Province, are rated first-class. Hawke's XI is designated England for the Test series which they won 3–0, winning all three matches by substantial margins. Tim O'Brien captained England in the first Test, although Hawke was playing, and Hawke was captain in the second and third Tests. The South African teams were captained by Ernest Halliwell (first two Tests) and Alfred Richards (third Test). Hawke's team was not a full-strength England team, but it did include four of the best players of the time in Tom Hayward, C. B. Fry, George Lohmann and Sammy Woods.

== Test series summary ==
England won the Test series 3–0.

=== First Test ===
13–14 February 1896
Scorecard

England	v	South Africa
185 (70.4 overs); CB Fry 43; J Middleton 5/64 (25.4 overs)		93 (30.4 overs); F Hearne 23; GA Lohmann 7/38 (15.4 overs)
226 (80.4 overs); SMJ Woods 53; J Middleton 4/66 (36 overs)		30 (18.4 overs); RM Poore 10; GA Lohmann 8/7 (9.4 overs)

England won by 288 runs
St George's Park, Port Elizabeth
Umpires: unknown

- South Africa won the toss and elected to field.
- RM Poore, JH Sinclair, CFW Hime, RA Gleeson, FJ Cook, J Middleton, JT Willoughby (all SA), and TW Hayward, CB Fry, AJL Hill, HR Bromley-Davenport, Lord Hawke, CW Wright, AM Miller and HR Butt (all ENG) made their Test debuts. SMJ Woods made his debut for ENG, having previously played for AUS.
- The match was completed in two days.
- The South African total of 30 was the lowest in Test cricket until 1954-55.
- Hugh Bromley-Davenport's 2nd innings analysis of 1-23 was 76.66% of the innings total score - the highest percentage of runs conceded by just one bowler in a completed Test match innings.

=== Second Test ===
2–4 March 1896
Scorecard

England	v	South Africa
482 (157.3 overs); TW Hayward 122; GA Rowe 5/115 (49 overs)		151 (46.2 overs); JH Sinclair 40; GA Lohmann 9/28 (14.2 overs)
		134 (f/o) (43.2 overs); EA Halliwell 41; C Heseltine 5/38 (16.2 overs)

England won by an innings and 197 runs
Old Wanderers, Johannesburg
Umpires: G Allsop (SA) and AM Miller (ENG). Allsop was sometimes substituted by HR Butt (ENG), WB Woolley (SA) and G Beves (SA).

- England won the toss and elected to bat.
- CL Johnson, GH Shepstone, WHB Frank, CB Llewellyn, GA Rowe (all SA), and C Heseltine (ENG) made their Test debuts.
- Umpire Miller had played for England in the previous Test.

=== Third Test ===
21–23 March 1896
Scorecard

South Africa	v	England
115 (48 overs); TW Routledge 24; GA Lohmann 7/42 (24 overs)		265 (101.4 overs); AJL Hill 124; J Middleton 3/50 (23.4 overs)
117 (64 overs); F Hearne 30; AJL Hill 4/8 (8 overs)

England won by an innings and 33 runs
Newlands, Cape Town
Umpires: G Beves (SA) and AM Miller (ENG)

- England won the toss and elected to field.
- 22 March was taken as a rest day
- AR Richards, AW Seccull, GK Glover (all SA), and EJ Tyler (ENG) made their Test debuts.
- The match was completed in two days.
