= Helfferich =

Helfferich is a surname. Notable people with the surname include:

- Merritt Randolph Helfferich, worker in Antarctica after whom Helfferich Glacier was named
- Karl Helfferich (1872–1924), German politician, economist, and financier

== See also ==
- Helfrich
- Helferich
