= Politieke Inlichtingendienst =

Political Intelligence Service
- Politieke Inlichtingendienst

Agency overview
- Formed: 1916
- Dissolved: 1945 (from 1942 under Japanese control)
- Headquarters: Batavia, Dutch East Indies

The Political Intelligence Service (Dutch: Politieke Inlichtingendienst, PID), was the main security agency for the Dutch East Indies from 1916 until its dissolution in 1945. The Political Intelligence Service was the most famous branch of the Dutch colonial police, although in its time most of its activities took place in secret.

== History ==
The PID existed officially from 1916 to 1919 and was then abandoned. Its duties were a few years later assigned to the General Investigation Service (Dutch: Algemeene Recherche Dienst) or ARD. The name PID remained in use, because in Surabaya and Semarang urban police department were still instituted under the name of PID.

Among the major tasks of the PID were overseeing the rules of the right of association and assembly and control of the press. Both focused primarily on the activities of Indonesian organizations who were critical of the government, from "loyal" opposition to efforts to overthrow colonial rule. For that task - at meetings and in the press - the participation of Indonesian personnel was essential, because of lack of competent Dutch. The wedana and mantri's police could therefore run the gauntlet at meetings where they were sitting in the front row. They could give speakers a warning or even dissolve meetings. Their position was unenviable. They found opposite often speakers who tried to locate the boundaries of the colonial tolerance. With imaginative word choices and calculated silences PID men were teased and bullied, to the delight of a sniggering room. And find in such an environment, which the colonial government had then to give an appropriate response.

== World War II ==
In mid-1942 (Java on August 1) the KNIL transferred his administrative duties over to the Japanese Military Administration (Gunseibu). In the Marine Region the Department of Marine Civil Administration operated. The Gunseibu was a military civilian administration device consisting of technical, economic and legal skilled Japanese officials. The commander of the occupation army was indeed the head of the military government but left the actual responsibility for the civil administration to his chief of staff. The military government had the responsibility to maintain order and peace, exploit natural resources in the conquered territories and to make the Japanese occupation forces self-sufficient. Monitoring compliance with Japanese regulations was owned by the Kempeitai, the Japanese military police. It was assisted by Indonesian officials of the PID.

Many of the newcomers of the PID were educated by the Japanese and was located by the reopened police school in Sukabumi, beside that one and only police academy which the Dutch East Indies had known, police schools came in all residences. It seems plausible to us that the number of officers of the PID important increased. The Kenpeitai soon made itself hated by their cruel acts, including the Indonesian PID - the Japanese had made this part of Dutch government apparatus completely subservient to their purposes. Who for instance ventured to listen to foreign radio broadcasts, had to fear that he would be reported by contingent traitors of the PID.

Soon after the evacuation from the Dutch East Indies, a Dutch intelligence service was set up in Australia on the instructions of the Dutch Commander of the forces in the East, Helfrich.

It was called the Netherlands East Indies Forces Intelligence Service (NEFIS), and was based in Melbourne. The service initially consisted of two divisions: NEFIS I, responsible for military reporting, and NEFIS II, responsible for security.

== See also ==
- CIA
- FBI
- Federal Agency of Government Communications and Information
- Federal Security Service (KGB successor)
- Presidential Security Service
- SMERSH
- Department of Homeland Security
