= Helferich =

Helferich is a surname of German origin, being a variant of the name Helfrich. Notable people with the surname include:

- Burckhardt Helferich (1887-1982), German chemist
  - Helferich method
- Heinrich Helferich (1851-1945), German surgeon
- Matthias Helferich (born 1988), German politician

== See also ==
- Helfrich
- Helfferich
