= Louis-Jérôme Gohier =

French politician (1746–1830)

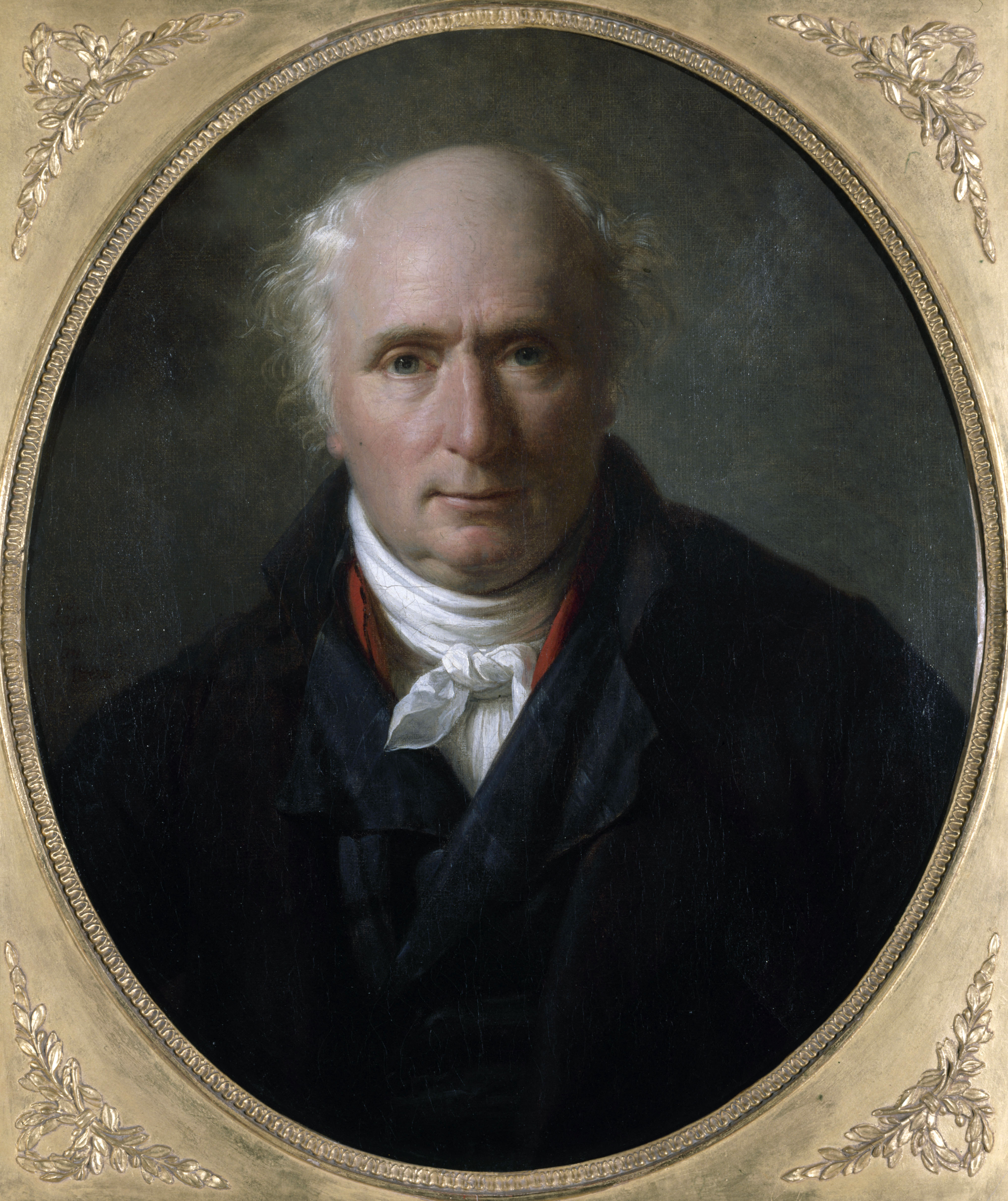
- Portrait by Jacques-Augustin-Catherine Pajou, c. 1802
- Born: 27 February 1746; Semblançay, Indre-et-Loire, France
- Died: 29 May 1830 (aged 84); Eaubonne, Val d'Oise, France

Signature
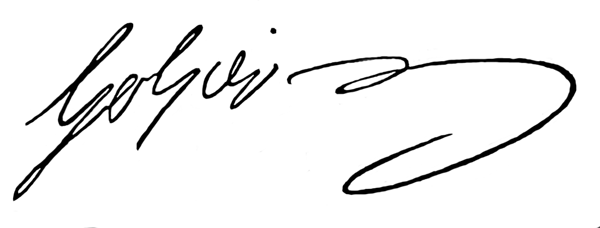

Louis-Jérôme Gohier (27 February 1746 – 29 May 1830) was a French politician of the Revolutionary period.

Gohier was born in Semblançay, in the Indre-et-Loire department of France. The son of a notary, he practiced law in Rennes. In 1789, he was one of the deputies of the tiers état (Third Estate, representing the "Commoners") elected to represent the town in the Estates-general. In the Legislative Assembly, he represented Ille-et-Vilaine, taking a prominent part in the deliberations. He protested against the exaction of a new oath from priests (22 November 1791), and demanded the sequestration of the émigrés' property (7 February 1792).

Gohier was Minister of Justice from March 1793 to April 1794, overseeing the arrest of Girondists, and a member of the Council of Five Hundred. He succeeded Jean Baptiste Treilhard in the French Directory (June 1799), where he represented the republican view in the face of growing royalist opposition.

== Gohier's interaction with Bonaparte ==
When Bonaparte suddenly returned from the Egyptian campaign in October 1799, he repeatedly tried to win the support of Gohier, who was then president of the Directory, for his political projects. After Bonaparte's 18 Brumaire (9 November 1799) coup d'état, Gohier refused to resign his office. He sought an audience with Bonaparte at the Tuileries Palace, in an attempt to save the Republic, but was put under arrest and escorted to the Luxembourg Palace. On his release, two days later, he retired to his estate at Eaubonne.

In 1802, Napoleon Bonaparte made Gohier consul-general at Amsterdam (in the Batavian Republic), and on the union of the Kingdom of Holland with the French Empire, he was offered a similar post in the United States. However, Gohier's health did not permit him to take up this new appointment. He thenceforward suffered from diseases for more than 20 years, before dying at Eaubonne (16 kilometers north of Paris). His wife, who had been a close friend to Joséphine de Beauharnais, had died in 1825, and, upon his death, Gohier left his wealth and surname to Mélanie d'Hervilly Hahnemann.

Gohier is buried next to his wife at the Père Lachaise cemetery.

== Works ==
- Mémoires d'un vétéran irréprochable de la Révolution (published in 1824)
- A report on the papers of the civil list preparatory to the trial of King Louis XVI, printed in Le Procès de Louis XVI (Paris) etc., while other reports are featured in the Le Moniteur Universel.

Political offices
Preceded by Dominique Joseph Garat	Minister of Justice; 1793–1794	Succeeded by Philippe-Antoine Merlin de Douai
