= Michael O'Doherty =

Michael O'Doherty may refer to:

- Michael J. O'Doherty (1874–1949), Archbishop of Manila
- Michael O'Doherty (publisher), Irish publisher

== See also ==
- Michael Doherty (disambiguation)
