= John Piton =

South African cricketer (1865–1942)

Personal information
- Born: 20 April 1865; Groot Drakenstein, South African Republic
- Died: 20 July 1942 (aged 77); Johannesburg, South Africa
- Source: ESPNcricinfo, 6 October 2016

John Piton (20 April 1865 – 20 July 1942) was a South African first-class cricketer. He played for Transvaal in the 1889–90 Currie Cup.
