= Herbert Mosenthal =

South African cricketer (1866–1904)

Personal information
- Born: 8 June 1866; Sydenham, England
- Died: 12 October 1904 (aged 38); Sidmouth, England
- Source: ESPNcricinfo, 6 October 2016

Herbert Mosenthal (8 June 1866 – 12 October 1904) was a South African first-class cricketer. He played for Transvaal in the 1889–90 Currie Cup.
