= William Newby (South African cricketer) =

South African cricketer (1855–1921)

Personal information
- Born: 26 October 1855; Stockton-on-Tees, England
- Died: 2 August 1921 (aged 65); Thornton-le-Dale, England
- Source: Cricinfo, 6 October 2016

William Newby (26 October 1855 – 2 August 1921) was a South African first-class cricketer. He played for Transvaal in the 1889–90 Currie Cup.
