= Kelvin Williams =

Trinidadian cricketer (born 1959)

Personal information
- Full name: Kelvin Claudius Williams
- Born: 29 May 1959 (age 67); Carapichaima, Trinidad
- Batting: Right-handed
- Bowling: Right-arm fast-medium

Domestic team information
- Years: Team
- 1981–1990: Trinidad and Tobago

Career statistics
Competition	First-class	List A
Matches	27	18
Runs scored	834	195
Batting average	24.52	19.50
100s/50s	0/4	0/0
Top score	91	33
Balls bowled	3,107	846
Wickets	59	16
Bowling average	29.62	36.12
5 wickets in innings	2	0
10 wickets in match	0	0
Best bowling	5/29	3/37
Catches/stumpings	12/–	3/–
- Source: CricketArchive, 3 February 2011

Kelvin Claudius Williams (born 29 May 1959 in Carapichaima, Trinidad) is a former cricketer and current head coach of Trinidad and Tobago, a team he represented throughout his playing career.
