= Alfred Edward Cooper =

South African cricketer

Alfred Cooper
Personal information
- Born: 10 August 1869; Cape Town, Cape Colony
- Died: 15 August 1960 (aged 91); Port Shepstone, Natal Province, South Africa
- Relatives: Alfred Cooper (son)

Domestic team information
- Years: Team
- 1890/91: Griqualand West
- 1896/97: Transvaal

Career statistics
Competition	First-class
Matches	5
Runs scored	82
Batting average	11.71
100s/50s	0/0
Top score	41
Balls bowled	950
Wickets	22
Bowling average	16.45
5 wickets in innings	1
10 wickets in match	1
Best bowling	8/80
Catches/stumpings	3/–
- Source: CricketArchive, 27 December 2014

Alfred Edward Cooper (10 August 1869 – 15 August 1960) was a South African cricketer who played at first-class level for Griqualand West and Transvaal.

Cooper was born in Cape Town in 1869. He made his first-class debut for Griqualand West in December 1890, against Eastern Province in the Champion Bat Tournament. (The team was then alternatively known as Kimberley, after the town of the same name). On debut, Cooper took three wickets (3/31) in Eastern Province's first innings, with the game concluding after two days with an Eastern Province victory. His next match came in the same tournament two days later, against Western Province at Newlands in Cape Town. In that match, Cooper opened the bowling with future South African international George Glover in each innings, taking 4/37 and 2/44.

The next first-class match Cooper played was in April 1891, for Griqualand West against a Transvaal side in the second season of the Currie Cup. The match, at the Wanderers ground in Johannesburg, was designated "timeless", and finished with a Griqualand West victory after six days of play spread over a week. Cooper failed to take a wicket, but did record his highest first-class score in Griqualand West's second innings, despite coming in last in the batting order. He scored 41 runs before being dismissed by George Allsop, and featured in a 95-run tenth-wicket partnership with Charlie Finlason, who finished with 154 not out. As of December 2014, this remains a record for the last wicket for Griqualand West.

Over six years later, Cooper again played at first-class level, appearing (for the only time) for Transvaal in the final of the 1896–97 Currie Cup, against Western Province. He bowled 44.3 five-ball overs in Western Province's first innings, finishing with 8/80. He took another three wickets, 3/56, in the second innings, consequently recording his only ten-wicket haul, match figures of 11/136. Despite Cooper's bowling, Transvaal still lost the match by 72 runs. Cooper's 8/80 was the first eight-wicket haul by a Transvaal player, and consequently the best bowling performance recorded for Transvaal at the time. It was surpassed, however, the following season, by Jimmy Sinclair's 8/40 (also against Western Province), and currently ranks thirteenth among bowling performances by Gauteng (Transvaal) players.

Cooper's final first-class appearance came in March 1898, against Natal for a "Transvaal XI" led by Abe (later Sir Abraham) Bailey. He did, however, appear for a XV of Transvaal in October 1902, aged 33, playing against the touring Australians. Cooper died in Port Shepstone, Natal, in August 1960, aged 91. His son, Alfred Henry Cecil Cooper (1893–1963), played first-class cricket for Transvaal and also a single Test match for the South African national side, against England during the 1913–14 season.
