= Alfred Cooper (cricketer) =

South African cricketer

Personal information
- Born: 2 September 1893; Johannesburg, South African Republic
- Died: 18 July 1963 (aged 69); Johannesburg, Transvaal, South Africa
- Batting: Right-handed
- Bowling: Right-arm medium
- Role: Batsman
- Relatives: Alfred Edward Cooper (father)

International information
- National side: South Africa
- Only Test: 13 December 1913 v England

Domestic team information
- Years: Team
- 1912/13–1928/29: Transvaal

Career statistics
Competition	Test	FC
Matches	1	37
Runs scored	6	1,788
Batting average	3.00	31.92
100s/50s	0/0	4/8
Top score	6	171*
Balls bowled	–	1,150
Wickets	–	15
Bowling average	–	37.06
5 wickets in innings	–	0
10 wickets in match	–	0
Best bowling	–	3/9
Catches/stumpings	1/–	27/–
- Source: CricketArchive, 27 December 2014

Alfred Henry Cecil Cooper (2 September 1893 – 18 July 1963) was a South African cricketer who played a single Test match for the South African national side during the 1913–14 season. Domestically, he played for Transvaal from 1912 to 1928.

Cooper was born in Johannesburg in September 1893, in what was then the independent South African Republic. His father, Alfred Edward Cooper (1869–1960), played first-class cricket for Transvaal and Griqualand West. The junior Alfred Cooper made his first-class debut in December 1912, for Transvaal against Orange Free State during the 1912–13 season of the Currie Cup. A right-handed top-order batsman, he scored 244 runs from four matches in his debut season, including two half-centuries. The following season, in November 1913, Cooper appeared for Transvaal in a match against a team led by former national captain Percy Sherwell. In the match, which served as a trial match for the upcoming Test series against England, he scored 109 runs in 90 minutes, his maiden first-class century. Cooper was consequently selected in the South African side for the First Test against England, played at Lord's, Durban. He came in sixth in each innings of what was to be his only Test, and was twice dismissed by Sydney Barnes, recording six runs in the first innings and a duck in the second.

Although Cooper, aged only 20 at the time of his debut, did not feature in the remainder of the Test series, he did play twice against the Englishmen for Transvaal. After the First World War, first-class cricket in South Africa did not resume until the 1919–20 season, when an Australian Imperial Forces side toured, featuring a number of past and future Australian Test players. Cooper played two matches for Transvaal against the AIF, and later represented South Africa against the Australians in what was termed an "unofficial Test", played at the Wanderers ground in Johannesburg in November 1919. The Currie Cup resumed during the 1920–21 season, after a seven-season hiatus. Cooper played regularly for Transvaal during the 1920s, and had a particularly strong 1921–22 season, scoring 352 runs from six matches, including a century. Against Western Province during the 1923–24 season, he scored 171 not out, his highest first-class score, to help Transvaal win by an innings and 54 runs.

Transvaal won the Currie Cup three times while Cooper was a part of the team – the 1923–24 edition, and the consecutive 1925–26 and 1926–27 editions. Cooper's final first-class appearance came in December 1928, against Border (the 1928–29 season being one when the Currie Cup was not contested). In that match, aged 35, he was named Transvaal's captain for the only time in his career, substituting for usual captain Nummy Deane. Cooper opened the bowling alongside Charles Cawse in Border's second innings (after following on), and took 3/9, his best first-class figures. He had previously bowled only irregularly.
