= Matt Harvie =

New Zealand cricketer (born 1984)

Personal information
- Full name: Mathew James Harvie
- Born: 7 June 1984 (age 42); Dunedin, Otago, New Zealand
- Batting: Right-handed
- Bowling: Right-arm fast-medium
- Role: Bowler

Domestic team information
- Years: Team
- 2002/03–2009/10: Otago
- FC debut: 14 February 2004 Otago v Auckland
- Last FC: 29 March 2010 Otago v Wellington
- LA debut: 18 January 2004 Otago v Wellington
- Last LA: 8 December 2009 Otago v Wellington

Career statistics
Competition	FC	LA	T20
Matches	26	14	5
Runs scored	233	60	26
Batting average	11.65	15.00	13.00
100s/50s	0/0	0/0	0/0
Top score	37*	19*	14*
Balls bowled	4,078	599	84
Wickets	60	21	5
Bowling average	40.68	24.57	24.60
5 wickets in innings	0	1	0
10 wickets in match	0	0	0
Best bowling	4/73	5/40	2/15
Catches/stumpings	8/–	0/–	1/–
- Source: ESPNcricinfo, 11 July 2023

Matthew James Harvie (born 7 June 1984) is a New Zealand former cricketer. He played 26 first-class and 14 List A matches for Otago between the 2004–05 and 2009–10 seasons.

Harvie was born at Dunedin in 1984 and educated at Otago Boys' High School in the city. He played age-group cricket for Otago in 2001–02 and 2002–03 before making his senior debut for the representative side the following season whilst still a student at the University of Otago.

A fast bowler who bowled with "good pace", Harvie played four first-class and four List A matches during his debut season. He did not play again for the representative side until 2006–07 when his "lively pace caused plenty of headaches". He took 18 List A wickets for the side and made his Twenty20 debut in the 2006–07 SuperSmash. A back injury which required surgery meant that he did not play at all the following season, although he returned to the side in 2008–09, taking 19 first-class wickets. He took the same number of wickets the following season, and at the end of the season was described by Otago's coach Glenn Turner as "a strapping right-armer who gets good bounce and is quite nippy". He did not, however, declare his availability for Otago ahead of the following season and dropped out of the representative side, retiring due to his persistent back injury.

In total Harvie took 60 first-class, 21 List A and five Twenty20 wickets for Otago. His only professional five-wicket haul came in a List A match against Northern Districts in January 2007, Harvie taking five wickets for the cost of 40 runs from his . He played Second XI cricket in England for Lancashire County Cricket Club in 2007 and in the Kent Cricket League for Beckenham in 2009. Since retiring he has worked in the financial services industry.
