= Dicky Richards =

South African cricketer (1862–1903)

Personal information
- Full name: William Henry Matthews Richards
- Born: 26 March 1862
- Died: 4 January 1903 (aged 40)
- Nickname: Dicky
- Batting: Right-handed

International information
- National side: South Africa
- Only Test (cap 13): 25 March 1889 v England

Career statistics
Competition	Test
Matches	1
Runs scored	4
Batting average	2.00
100s/50s	0/0
Top score	4
Catches/stumpings	0/–
- Source: Cricinfo, 13 November 2022

William Henry Matthews "Dicky" Richards (26 March 1862 – 4 January 1903) was a South African cricketer who played in one Test match in 1889.

The match was the second in the 1888–89 series against the team led by Sir C. Aubrey Smith, and called at the time "C. A. Smith's XI", but retrospectively accorded the status of a full England team. In fact, in the game at Newlands, Cape Town played by Richards, the touring side was led by Monty Bowden. Richards batted at No 7 in each innings and scored 0 and 4 as South Africa were bowled out for 47 and 43 to lose by an innings and 202 runs.

The match was Richards' only first-class game, although he played for Western Province in the years before provincial matches in South Africa were considered first-class.

Richards' two brothers, Joseph and Alfred, played first-class cricket for Western Province and Alfred played once for South Africa in 1895–96.
