= Alfred Richards (sportsman) =

South African cricketer and rugby union player

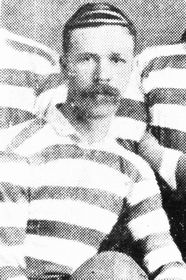

Personal information
- Full name: Alfred Renfrew Richards
- Born: 14 December 1867; Grahamstown, Cape Colony
- Died: 9 January 1904 (aged 36); Salisbury, Rhodesia
- Batting: Right-handed

International information
- National side: South Africa

Career statistics
Competition	Tests	First-class
Matches	1	9
Runs scored	6	346
Batting average	3.00	23.06
100s/50s	0/0	1/1
Top score	6	108
Balls bowled
Wickets
Bowling average
5 wickets in innings
10 wickets in match
Best bowling
Catches/stumpings	0/–	13/2
- Source: Cricinfo

Rugby union career
- Position(s): Inside centre Fly-half
Amateur team(s)
Years	Team	Apps	(Points)
–	Villager Football Club		
Provincial / State sides
Years	Team	Apps	(Points)
1890–1895	Western Province		
International career
Years	Team	Apps	(Points)
1891	South Africa	3	

Alfred Renfrew Richards (14 December 1867 – 9 January 1904) was a South African sportsman who represented his country at Test cricket and rugby union. Born in Grahamstown, Cape Colony, and educated at The Leys School in Cambridge, Richards was capped three times for South Africa in rugby, including captaining them once, and made one Test cricket appearance, also as captain.

== Cricket career ==
Richards, an opening batsman, played for Western Province in some of the earliest provincial matches in South Africa. In 1893–94, his 108 was the highest score as his team beat Natal to win the Currie Cup.

His next first-class match came when he captained Western Province against the touring Lord Hawke's XI in 1895–96, when his 58, scored out of a total of 122, won him selection for the third Test match of the series, which followed a few days later. Richards captained the Test side, but scored only 6 and 0 as South Africa lost by an innings and 33 runs. He never played first-class cricket again.

== Rugby career ==
Richards made his international rugby debut for South Africa in 1891, the year that the British Isles rugby team came to South Africa for the very first time. He made his debut on 30 July in Port Elizabeth. South Africa were outscored three tries to nil, and Great Britain won the match 4 points to nil. He was capped again on 29 August in Kimberley, which Great Britain also won, 3 to nil.

On 5 September, he was chosen as the captain to lead South Africa out against Great Britain once again, in Cape Town at Newlands. The tourists also won the match, four points to nil. Richards did not play for South Africa again after the tour. Richards did however referee one match in 1896, when Britain returned, at Newlands, which South Africa won five points to nil.

=== Test history ===
No.	Opponents	Results(SA 1st)	Position	Tries	Date	Venue
1.	(United Kingdom) British Isles	0–4	Centre		30 Jul 1891	Crusaders Ground, Port Elizabeth
2.	(United Kingdom) British Isles	0–3	Halfback		29 Aug 1891	Eclectic Cricket Ground, Kimberley
3.	(United Kingdom) British Isles	0–4	Centre (c)		5 Sep 1891	Newlands, Cape Town

== Personal ==
Richards' older brothers, Dicky and Joseph, also played cricket for Western Province and Dicky appeared in one Test match in 1888–89.

He died at Salisbury, Rhodesia, of typhoid fever, in January 1904, aged 36.

== See also ==
- List of footballers (rugby union) by country
- South African rugby union captains
- List of South Africa national rugby union players – Springbok no. 6

Sporting positions
Preceded by Bob Snedden	Springbok Captain; 1891	Succeeded by Ferdie Aston
