= Thomas Dixon (South African cricketer) =

South African cricketer (1847–1915)

Personal information
- Born: 6 October 1847; Shoreditch, England
- Died: 23 April 1915 (aged 67); Potchefstroom, South Africa
- Source: ESPNcricinfo, 6 October 2016

Thomas Dixon (6 October 1847 – 23 April 1915) was a South African first-class cricketer. He played for Transvaal in the 1889–90 Currie Cup.
