= Mélanie Hahnemann =

French homeopathic physician

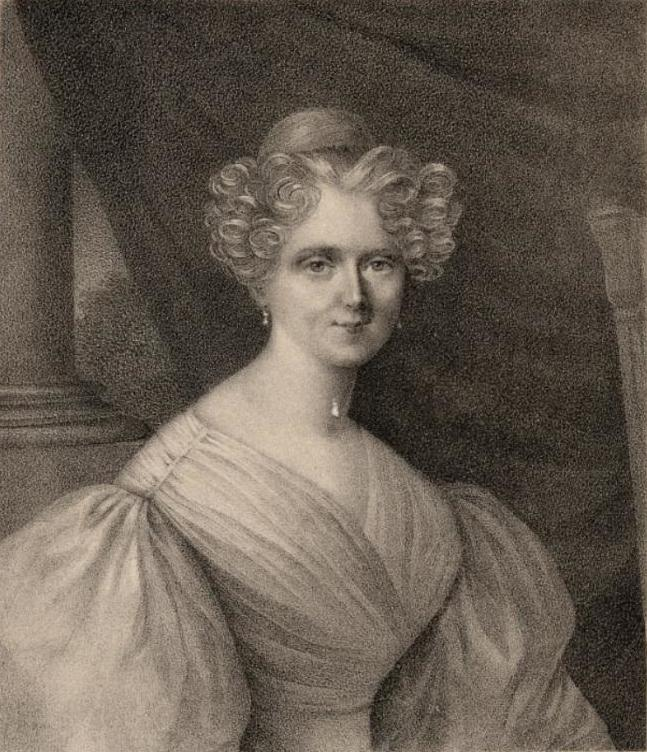
Portrait of Mélanie Hahnemann, née d'Hervilly Gohier

Marie Mélanie d'Hervilly Gohier Hahnemann (Bruxelles, 2 February 1800 – Paris, 27 May 1878) was a French homeopathic physician, married in 1835 to Samuel Hahnemann. She was the first female homeopathic physician.

Mélanie d'Hervilly was reportedly a member of a noble family, but because of domestic violence she lived with the family of her art teacher Guillaume Guillon-Lethière in Paris from 1815 and made a living by selling her paintings. She received the surname Gohier as the posthumously adopted daughter of Louis-Jérôme Gohier, who had been president of the French Directory until 9 November 1799 (18 Brumaire VIII), when it was overthrown by Napoleon in the coup of 18 Brumaire. When he died in 1830 he named the then 30-year-old Mélanie d'Hervilly, 54 years younger, as his heir. She buried Gohier in Montmartre cemetery, and then two years later her foster-father the painter Lethière beside him.

During the cholera epidemic of Paris in 1832, she became interested in homeopathy. In 1834, she visited Samuel Hahnemann, and the year after they married and moved to Paris, where they opened a clinic. She was his student and assistant and soon an independent homeopathist. She was given a diploma from Allentown Academy of The Homeopathic Healing Art, co-founded by John Helfrich (1795–1852) in Allentown, Pennsylvania.

At the death of Samuel Hahnemann, she was entrusted with his clinic and the manuscript of his latest work, Organon. She continued with the practice, but in 1847, she was put on trial and found guilty of illegal practice. She continued to practice and was granted a medical license in 1872. She was a controversial person as both a woman physician and a woman homeopath.

She is buried in the Père Lachaise Cemetery.

== Sources ==
- https://web.archive.org/web/20110708124054/http://www.wholehealthnow.com/homeopathy_pro/melanie_hahnemann.html
- http://www.hahnemanninstituut.nl/1/106/melanie-hahnemann/
- Rima Handley: A Homeopathic Love Story
