= Spranger Harrison =

South African cricketer (1857–1927)

Personal information
- Full name: John Spranger Harrison
- Born: 29 June 1857; Ellel, Lancashire, England
- Died: 18 June 1927 (aged 69); Potchefstroom, South Africa
- Source: ESPNcricinfo, 6 October 2016

Spranger Harrison (29 June 1857 – 18 June 1927) was a South African first-class cricketer. He played for Transvaal in the 1889–90 Currie Cup.
