= Ronald Hewat =

South African cricketer and soldier (1887–1944)

Personal information
- Full name: Ronald Duxbury Hewat
- Born: 22 April 1887; Umtata, Cape Colony
- Died: 15 January 1944 (aged 56); Cape Town, Cape Province, South Africa

Domestic team information
- Years: Team
- 1921/22: Griqualand West

Career statistics
Competition	First-class
Matches	1
Runs scored	30
Batting average	–
100s/50s	–
Top score	24*
Balls bowled	120
Wickets	1
Bowling average	84.00
5 wickets in innings	0
10 wickets in match	0
Best bowling	1/44
Catches/stumpings	0/–
- Source: Cricinfo, 13 June 2022

Ronald Duxbury Hewat MC (22 April 1887 – 15 February 1944) was a South African first-class cricketer and South African Army soldier.

One of eleven children of Andrew Hewat and Elizabeth Usher, he was born at Umtata in April 1887. Hewat served as a corporal in the First World War in the South African Infantry, which formed part of the South African Overseas Expeditionary Force on the Western Front. In July 1918, he gained a temporary officer commission as a second lieutenant. He was awarded the Military Cross in March 1919 for conspicuous gallantry and devotion to duty which took place from 15 to 17 October 1918. The 2nd Battalion were tasked with capturing two bridges over the River Selle on the outskirts of Le Cateau and establishing bridgeheads. Commanding a party of men, he succeeded in these objectives and held the positions for two days while under heavy fire until the Allied attack was launched on the 17th.

Upon his return to South Africa, Hewat made a single appearance in first-class cricket for Griqualand West against Western Province at Cape Town in the 1921–22 Currie Cup. He scored 30 runs in the match and took a single wicket, that of C. H. Thomas. Hewat later served in the South African Army during World War II as a private in the Essential Services Protection Corps. He died on active service in Cape Town in February 1944.
