= Joseph Willoughby =

South African cricketer (1874–1952)

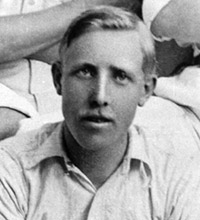

Personal information
- Born: 7 November 1874; Aldershot, Hampshire, England
- Died: 11 March 1952 (aged 77); Plumstead, Cape Town, Western Cape, South Africa
- Batting: Right-handed
- Bowling: Right-arm fast

International information
- National side: South Africa
- Test debut: 13 February 1896 v England
- Last Test: 21 March 1896 v England

Career statistics
Competition	Test
Matches	2
Runs scored	8
Batting average	2.00
100s/50s	0/0
Top score	5
Balls bowled	275
Wickets	6
Bowling average	26.50
5 wickets in innings	0
10 wickets in match	0
Best bowling	2/37
Catches/stumpings	0/–
- Source: Cricinfo, 13 November 2022

Joseph Thomas Willoughby (7 November 1874 – 11 March 1952) was a South African cricketer who played in two Test matches in 1896.

In the first match of the English tour of South Africa in 1895–96, Willoughby took 6 for 15 in the second innings to dismiss Lord Hawke's XI for 92 and give the Western Province XV victory by 74 runs. He later played in the first and third of the three Tests in the series, taking six wickets. In the first Test he dismissed George Lohmann for a pair, and Lohmann did the same to him.
