= Fleringen =

Fleringen Fleringn (Twents)
- Village
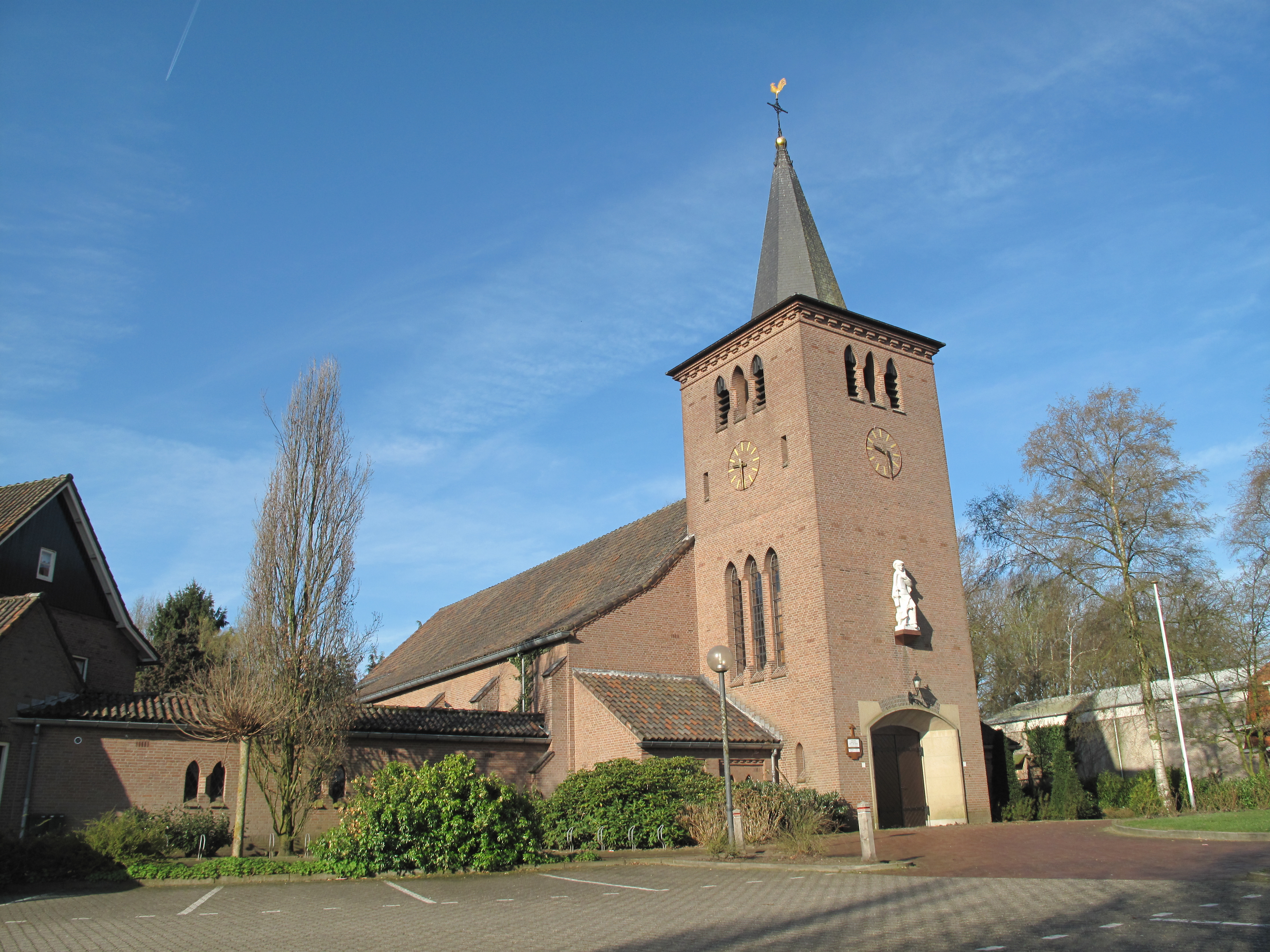
- Church of Fleringen

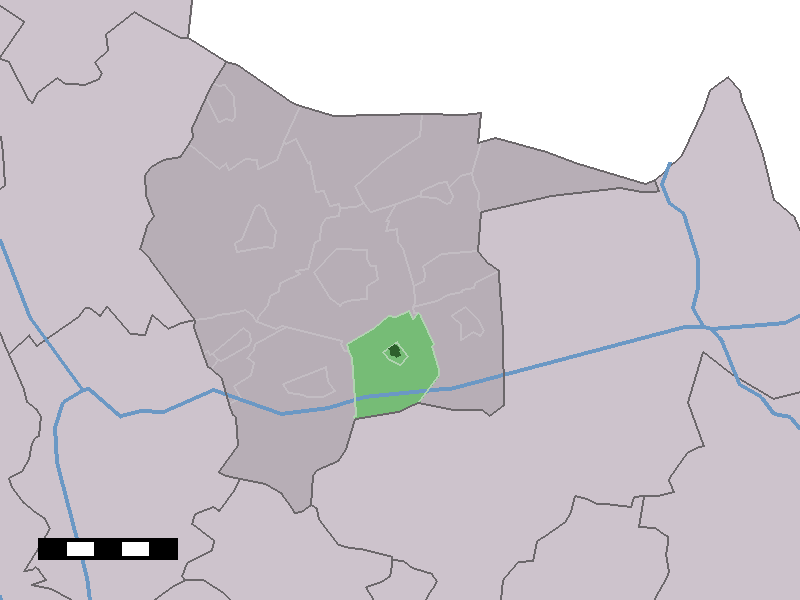
- The village centre (dark green) and the statistical district (light green) of Fleringen in the municipality of Tubbergen.

- Location in province of Overijssel in the Netherlands Fleringen (Netherlands)
- Coordinates: 52°23′N 6°48′E
- Country: Netherlands
- Province: Overijssel
- Municipality: Tubbergen

Area
  - Total: 9.34 km^{2} (3.61 sq mi)
- Elevation: 17 m (56 ft)

Population (2021)
  - Total: 890
  - Density: 95/km^{2} (250/sq mi)
- Time zone: UTC+1 (CET)
  - Summer (DST): UTC+2 (CEST)
- Postal code: 7666
- Dialing code: 0546

Fleringen (Tweants: Fleringn) is a village in the Dutch province of Overijssel. It is a part of the municipality of Tubbergen, and lies about 10 km east of Almelo.

It was first mentioned in 1227 as van Vlederingen. The etymology is unknown. The havezate Herinckhave was first mentioned in the 14th century. The current building dates from the 17th century. A part of the manor house burnt down in 1959 was rebuilt in 1977–78. In 1840, it was home to 334 people. From the 1950s onwards, Fleringen started to grow.

== Gallery ==
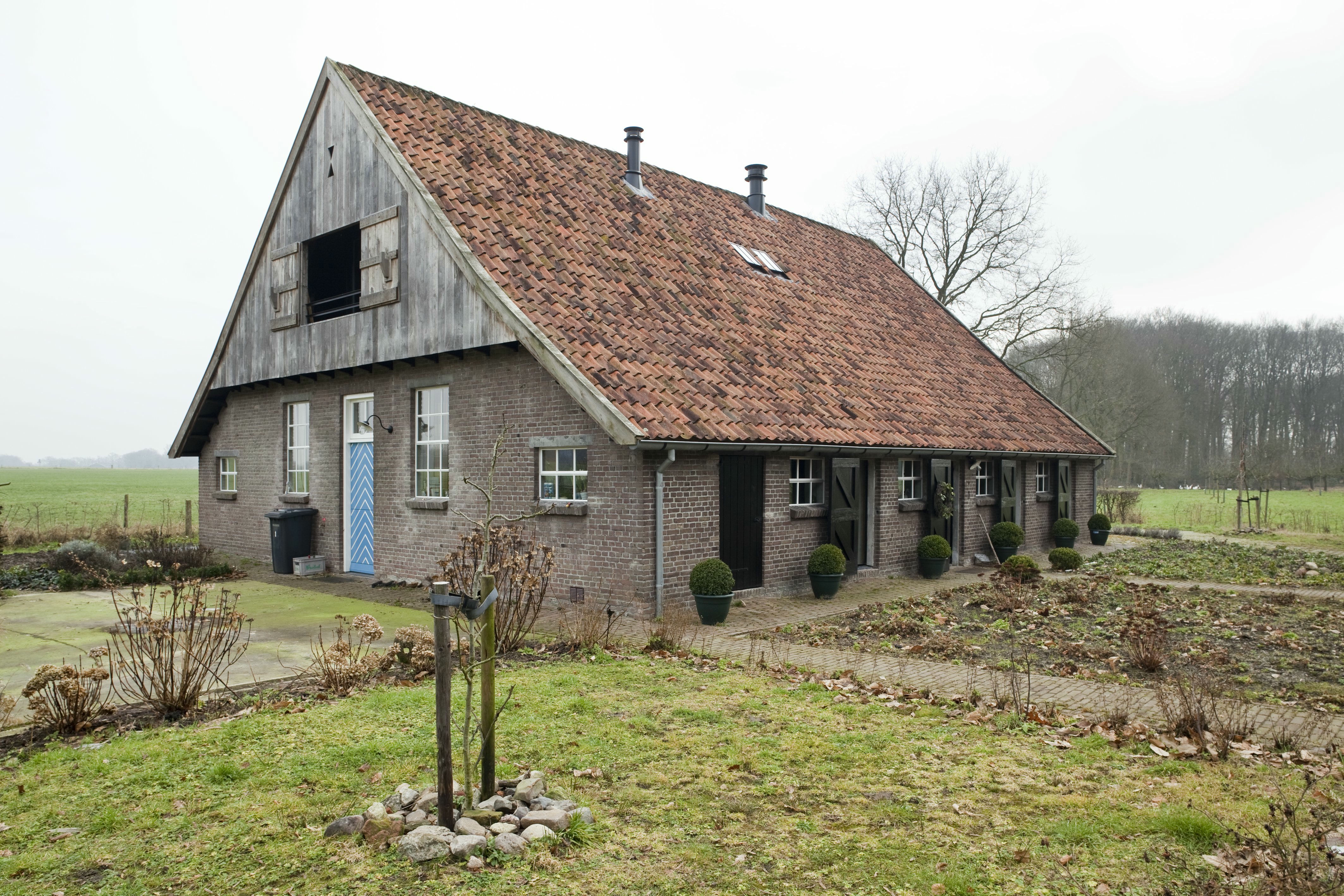
Farm in Fleringen

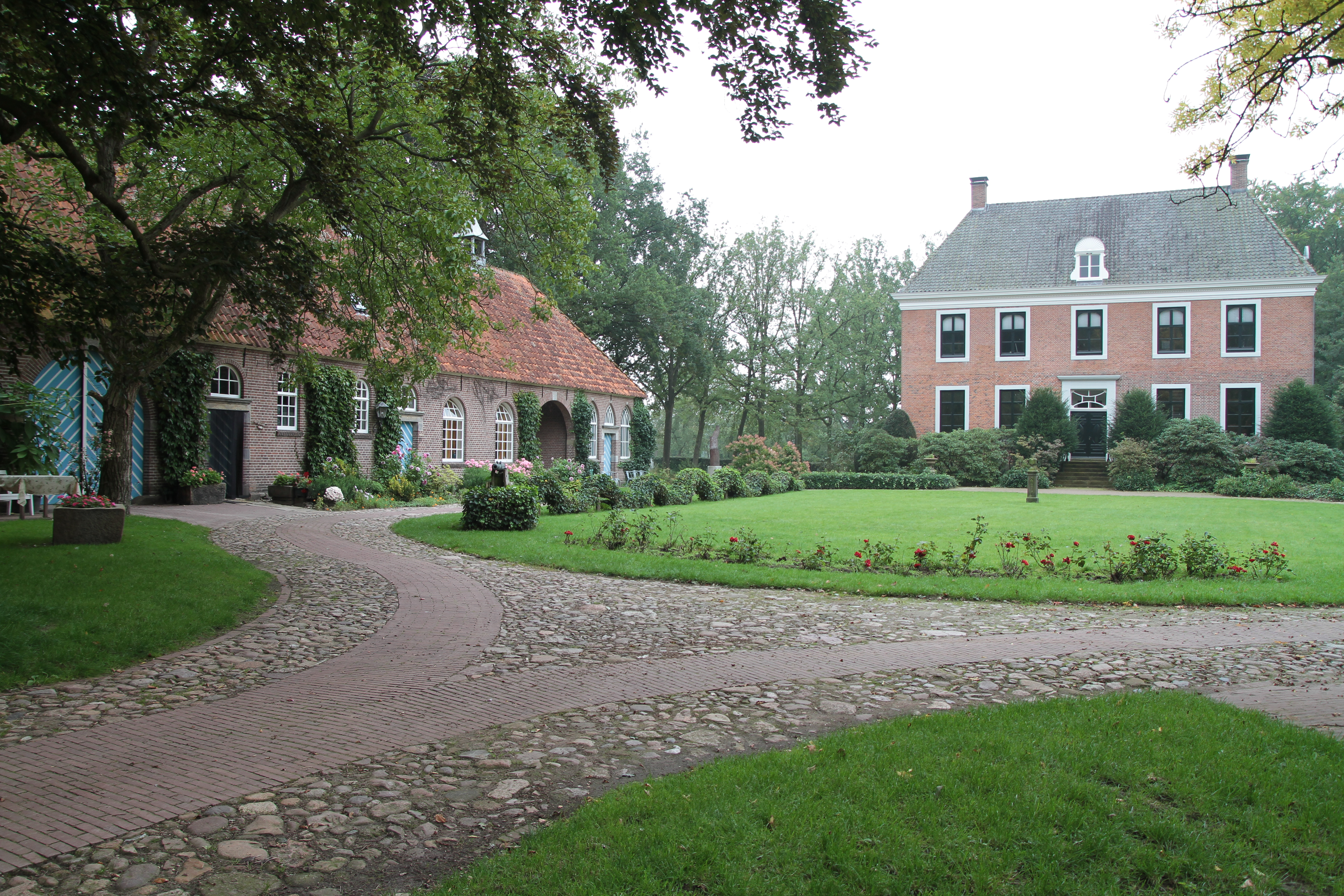
Havezate Herinckhave
