= Essential Services Protection Corps =

- Active: 1939 – 1950
- Disbanded: October 1950
- Country: South Africa
- Allegiance: (Union of South Africa) South Africa
- Size: 8,468

Commanders
- Notable commanders: Brigadier C.H. Blaine

Essential Services Protection Corps was a Union Defence Force (UDF) unit formed in South Africa in October 1939. It was formed to maintain internal security, guarding essential infrastructure in the country during the Second World War.

== Background ==
The unit was formed on 29 October 1939 under the command of Brigadier C.H. Blaine and initially consisted of the Cape Town, Durban, East London, and Port Elizabeth companies. By December of the same year, two further companies were added.

The men enlisted were 45 years or older and consisted of ex-servicemen. They were to guard essential infrastructure such as roads, railways, ports, airports, waterworks, and power stations. It started with a complement of fifty-six officers, 2,400 ranks and three hundred non-white personnel and this rose to 8,468 men of all races. It was merged into the Auxiliary Services in October 1950. The unit recorded 275 war dead.

== Formation ==
It consisted of two regiments. Lt-Col. J. Spence commanded the 1st Regiment. It consisted of an Inland Company, Cape Town Company, Durban Company, East London Company, and Port Elizabeth Company.

The 2nd Regiment was commanded by Colonel P. Imker Hoogenhout and consisted of the Roads Company under Lt-Col. B. Gould.
