= Henry Budgen =

English cricketer

Personal information
- Full name: Henry Richard Budgen
- Born: 4 July 1865; Brighton, Sussex, England
- Died: 13 March 1929 (aged 63); Ilford, Essex, England
- Batting: Right-handed
- Bowling: Unknown

Domestic team information
- Years: Team
- 1886–1892: Sussex

Career statistics
Competition	First-class
Matches	10
Runs scored	120
Batting average	7.50
100s/50s	–/–
Top score	32
Balls bowled	40
Wickets	–
Bowling average	–
5 wickets in innings	–
10 wickets in match	–
Best bowling	–
Catches/stumpings	6/–
- Source: Cricinfo, 1 July 2012

Henry Richard Budgen (4 July 1865 – 13 March 1929) was an English cricketer. Budgen was a right-handed batsman, although his bowling style is unknown. He was born at Brighton, Sussex.

Budgen made his first-class debut for Sussex against the Marylebone Cricket Club at Lord's in 1886. He made nine further first-class appearances for the county, the last of which came against Somerset at the County Ground, Taunton, in the 1892 County Championship. In his ten first-class matches, he scored a total of 120 runs at an average of 7.50, with a high score of 32.

He died at Ilford, Essex, on 13 March 1929.
