= Karl Helfrich =

American physical oceanographer

- Born: Karl R. Helfrich
- Education: Duke University (BS); Massachusetts Institute of Technology (MS)
- Occupation: Physical oceanographer

Karl R. Helfrich is an American physical oceanographer.

Helfrich earned his Bachelor of Science in engineering from Duke University in 1979. He completed a Master of Science degree and doctorate from the Massachusetts Institute of Technology in 1982 and 1985, respectively. He is a senior scientist at Woods Hole Oceanographic Institution, serving as J. S. Johnson Chair as Education Coordinator from 2001 to 2006, and was H. B. Bigelow Chair for Excellence in Oceanography between 2014 and 2017. In 2001, Helfrich was elected a fellow of the American Physical Society "[f]or laboratory, analytical, numerical, and observational contributions to understanding waves, hydraulic control, abyssal ocean circulation, thermals, plumes, viscous fingering and other areas of geophysical fluid dynamics."
