= Alan Kruger =

South African cricketer

Personal information
- Full name: Alan Kevin Kruger
- Born: 16 February 1981 (age 45); Kimberley, Cape Province, South Africa
- Batting: Right-handed
- Bowling: Right-arm medium-fast
- Role: All-rounder

Domestic team information
- Years: Team
- 2000/01–2014/15: Griqualand West
- 2005/06–2009/10: Eagles

Career statistics
Competition	FC	LA	T20
Matches	111	100	25
Runs scored	5153	1570	119
Batting average	30.31	20.38	9.91
100s/50s	6/28	0/5	0/0
Top score	221*	86	30
Balls bowled	11235	2940	264
Wickets	217	87	11
Bowling average	31.10	29.72	28.63
5 wickets in innings	6	0	0
10 wickets in match	1	0	0
Best bowling	6/37	4/20	2/24
Catches/stumpings	44/–	23/–	14/–
- Source: Cricinfo, 8 December 2020

Alan Kevin Kruger (born 16 February 1981) is a South African first-class cricketer and coach.

Kruger played as an all-rounder for Griqualand West and Eagles from 2000 to 2015. His highest score was 221 not out off 265 balls for Griqualand West against North West in 2013–14. His best innings bowling figures were 6 for 37 against Free State in 2005–06. He took his best match bowling figures a week later: 11 for 66 (5 for 20 and 6 for 46) against Easterns.

When his playing career ended, Kruger became a coach. He was the head coach for Knights for two years before being appointed head coach of South Western Districts in August 2020.
