= Gordon Beves =

South African cricket umpire (1862–1927)

Personal information
- Born: 15 March 1862; Brighton, England
- Died: 22 March 1927 (aged 65); Auckland Park, Johannesburg, South Africa

Umpiring information
- Tests umpired: 1 (1896)
- Source: Cricinfo, 1 July 2013

Gordon Beves (15 March 1862 – 22 March 1927) was a South African cricket umpire. He stood in one Test match in 1896. He also played in eighteen first-class matches from 1888 to 1898/99. Beeves was the captain of Transvaal when they won the Currie Cup in 1895, and later became the Chairman of the South African Cricket Association.

== See also ==
- List of Test cricket umpires
