= Rudolph Howe =

South African cricketer (1857–1936)

Personal information
- Born: 15 July 1857; Colchester, Cape Colony
- Died: 2 December 1936 (aged 79); Cape Town, South Africa
- Source: ESPNcricinfo, 6 October 2016

Rudolph Howe (15 July 1857 – 2 December 1936) was a South African first-class cricketer. He played for Kimberley in the 1889–90 Currie Cup.
