= Reece Williams (cricketer) =

South African cricketer (born 1988)

Personal information
- Born: 16 November 1988 (age 37)
- Source: Cricinfo, 3 December 2017

Reece Williams (born 16 November 1988) is a South African cricketer. He made his first-class debut for Northern Cape in the 2007–08 Sunfoil 3-Day Cup on 14 February 2008. He made his List A debut for Northern Cape in the 2007–08 CSA Provincial One-Day Challenge on 17 February 2008.
