= Revelation Plaatjie =

South African cricketer

Personal information
- Full name: Tsherolo Revelation Plaatjie
- Born: 11 June 1982 (age 44); Kimberley, Cape Province, South Africa
- Batting: Right-handed
- Bowling: Right-arm fast
- Role: Bowler

Domestic team information
- Years: Team
- 2004/05–2011/12: Griqualand West
- 2006/07–2007/08: Easterns

Career statistics
Competition	FC	LA	T20
Matches	20	19	1
Runs scored	286	52	—
Batting average	16.82	26.00	—
100s/50s	0/0	0/0	—
Top score	49*	20*	—
Balls bowled	1,682	647	6
Wickets	39	18	0
Bowling average	30.41	32.38	–
5 wickets in innings	1	0	–
10 wickets in match	0	0	–
Best bowling	6/42	3/51	–
Catches/stumpings	2/–	2/–	0/–
- Source: CricketArchive, 1 September 2015

Tsherolo Revelation Plaatjie (born 11 June 1982) is a former South African cricketer who played for Griqualand West and Easterns at provincial level, as a right-arm fast bowler.

Born in Kimberley, Plaatjie made his senior debut for Griqualand West during the 2004–05 season of the UCB Provincial Cup, playing a first-class match against North West in October 2004. The following season, he added another five matches in the same competition, also making his limited-overs debut. However, he switched to Easterns for the 2006–07 season. In his debut three-day match for his team, Plaatjie faced his old side, and went to make a career-best 49 not out in the second innings, from number ten in the batting order. He put on 112 for the ninth wicket with David Wiese, and after Wiese's dismissal hung on for five more runs with the number-eleven batsman, Petros Mofokeng, guiding his team to a one-wicket win.

The 2006–07 season saw Plaatjie finish the provincial three-day season with 25 wickets from eight matches, behind only David Wiese (30 wickets) for Easterns. Against Mpumalanga, he took what was to be his only first-class five-wicket haul, 6/42 from 13.1 overs. However, during the 2007–08 season, Plaatjie struggled for form, playing only five three-day matches and two limited-overs matches in what was to be his last season with Easterns. After a gap of several years without any high-level cricket, he returned to Griqualand West for the 2010–11 season, where he was used predominantly in the one-day format. His final match at provincial level was a one-off limited-overs appearance in February 2012, against Boland.
