= Irvine Grimmer =

South African cricketer (1862–1951)

Personal information
- Born: 7 July 1862; Colesberg, Cape Colony
- Died: 5 April 1951 (aged 88); Muizenberg, South Africa
- Source: ESPNcricinfo, 6 October 2016

Irvine Grimmer (7 July 1862 – 5 April 1951) was a South African first-class cricketer. He played for Kimberley in the 1889–90 Currie Cup.
