= Robert Gleeson =

South African cricketer (1872–1919)

Personal information
- Full name: Robert Anthony Gleeson
- Born: 10 December 1872; Port Elizabeth, Cape Colony
- Died: 27 September 1919 (aged 46); Port Elizabeth, Cape Province, South Africa
- Batting: Right-handed
- Bowling: Right-arm medium

International information
- National side: South Africa
- Only Test: 13 February 1896 v England

Career statistics
Competition	Test	First-class
Matches	1	9
Runs scored	4	312
Batting average	4.00	18.35
100s/50s	0/0	0/2
Top score	3	71
Balls bowled	–	166
Wickets	–	7
Bowling average	–	9.85
5 wickets in innings	–	0
10 wickets in match	–	0
Best bowling	–	4/9
Catches/stumpings	2/–	6/–
- Source: CricketArchive, 13 November 2022

Robert Anthony Gleeson (10 December 1872 – 27 September 1919) was a South African cricketer who played one Test match in 1896.

A useful batsman and a medium-pace bowler, Robert Gleeson's first-class career spanned the years 1894 to 1904, interrupted by a break of six years between 1897 and 1903. Playing for Eastern Province, he was more effective in the first half of his career, hitting up scores of, amongst others, 67 against Transvaal at Cape Town in March 1894 and 71 against Natal at Johannesburg in March 1897. He also recorded his best bowling figures during this period, 4 for 9 against Griqualand West at Cape Town in March 1894.

When Lord Hawke brought an England side to South Africa in 1895–96, Gleeson was selected for the First Test, played at St George's Park, Port Elizabeth. Scoring just 3 in South Africa's first innings and 1 not out in their second, as well as holding two catches, he failed to impress enough to secure a place for the other two matches in the series.

Gleeson, who worked as a wool buyer, married a widow, Florence Hall, in Port Elizabeth in April 1919. He died in September that year, aged 46.
