= Edward Beech =

South African cricketer (1862–1933)

Personal information
- Born: March 1862; London, England
- Died: 30 May 1933; Kimberley, South Africa
- Source: Cricinfo, 6 October 2016

Edward Beech (March 1862 – 30 May 1933) was a South African first-class cricketer. He played for Kimberley in the 1889–90 Currie Cup.
