= John Coghlan (cricketer) =

South African cricketer (1867–1945)

Personal information
- Born: 4 June 1867; Wasbank, Colony of Natal
- Died: 29 June 1945 (aged 78); Bulawayo, Rhodesia
- Source: ESPNcricinfo, 6 October 2016

John Coghlan (4 June 1867 – 29 June 1945) was a South African cricketer. He played for Kimberley in the 1889–90 Currie Cup.
