= Mark Helfrich =

Mark Helfrich may refer to:

- Mark Helfrich (American football) (born 1973), American football coach
- Mark Helfrich (film editor) (born 1957), American film editor
- Mark Helfrich (politician) (born 1978), German politician
