= Errol Draper =

South African cricketer

Personal information
- Full name: Errol John Draper
- Born: 27 September 1934 (age 92); Port Elizabeth, Cape Province, South Africa
- Batting: Right-handed
- Bowling: Slow left-arm orthodox
- Relatives: Ronald Draper (brother)

Domestic team information
- Years: Team
- 1951/52: Eastern Province
- 1953/54–1967/68: Griqualand West

Career statistics
Competition	First-class
Matches	59
Runs scored	2,733
Batting average	26.79
100s/50s	4/13
Top score	118
Balls bowled	1,554
Wickets	22
Bowling average	36.86
5 wickets in innings	1
10 wickets in match	0
Best bowling	6/114
Catches/stumpings	43/–
- Source: Cricinfo, 26 September 2015

Errol John Draper (born 27 September 1934) is a former South African cricketer who played first-class cricket from 1951 to 1968.

At 17 Errol Draper followed his elder brother Ron into the Eastern Province team in the 1951–52 season, taking 6 for 114 in the first innings of his debut Currie Cup match. He played only once more for Eastern Province before following Ron to Griqualand West, where he played as a middle-order batsman and occasional left-arm spinner. His best seasons were 1954–55 (407 runs at an average of 37.00) and 1955–56 (435 at 39.54), but he remained a regular member of the team until 1967–68, when he made his highest score, 118 against Orange Free State, his third century against Orange Free State in his final first-class match. He captained Griqualand West in the Currie Cup in 1959–60 and from 1962–63 to 1967–68.
