= Walter Woodthorpe =

South African cricketer (1860–1943)

Personal information
- Born: 17 October 1860; Brentwood, England
- Died: 6 January 1943 (aged 82); Kimberley, South Africa
- Source: ESPNcricinfo, 6 October 2016

Walter Woodthorpe (17 October 1860 – 6 January 1943) was a South African first-class cricketer. He played for Kimberley in the 1889–90 Currie Cup.
