= Ronald Draper (cricketer) =

South African cricketer (1926–2025)

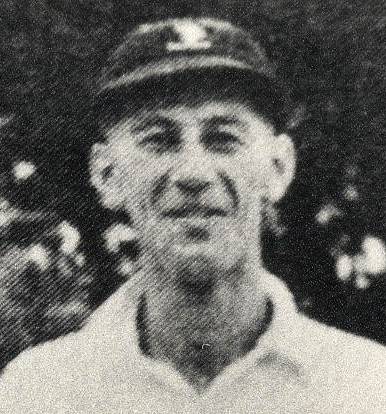
- Draper in 1950

Personal information
- Full name: Ronald George Draper
- Born: 24 December 1926; Oudtshoorn, Cape Province, South Africa
- Died: 25 February 2025 (aged 98); Gqeberha, Eastern Cape, South Africa
- Batting: Right-handed
- Role: Occasional wicket-keeper
- Relatives: Errol Draper (brother)

International information
- National side: South Africa
- Test debut (cap 175): 10 February 1950 v Australia
- Last Test: 3 March 1950 v Australia

Domestic team information
- Years: Team
- 1945/46–1949/50: Eastern Province
- 1950/51–1959/60: Griqualand West

Career statistics
| Competition | Test | First-class |
|---|---|---|
| Matches | 2 | 48 |
| Runs scored | 25 | 3,290 |
| Batting average | 8.33 | 41.64 |
| 100s/50s | 0/0 | 11/11 |
| Top score | 15 | 177 |
| Balls bowled | – | 32 |
| Wickets | – | 1 |
| Bowling average | – | 27.00 |
| 5 wickets in innings | – | 0 |
| 10 wickets in match | – | 0 |
| Best bowling | – | 1/7 |
| Catches/stumpings | 0/– | 32/10 |
- Source: ESPNcricinfo, 31 January 2021

Ronald George Draper (24 December 1926 – 25 February 2025) was a South African cricketer who played in two Tests in 1950. He played first-class cricket from 1945 to 1959. For the last few years of his life, he was the oldest living Test cricketer.

== Playing career ==
Draper was born in Oudtshoorn, Cape Province, and was educated at Grey High School in Port Elizabeth (now Gqeberha). Batting at number three, on his 19th birthday he made a century on his first-class debut for Eastern Province in December 1945, making the top score in the match. He began keeping wickets for Eastern Province in 1946–47, which he did irregularly for the rest of his career.

Draper was selected as wicket-keeper for a South African XI that played the Australian touring team in 1949–50. A few weeks later he made 86 opening the batting for Eastern Province against the Australians. After South Africa lost the first three Tests to Australia, Draper was one of five new players the selectors brought in for the Fourth Test, four of whom, including Draper, were making their Test debuts. Batting at number three, he made only 15, but the match was drawn and he kept his place for the Fifth Test, when he made 7 and 3 in an innings defeat.

He played no further Tests, but remained a batsman in the Currie Cup for some years. In his first two matches in the 1952–53 season, now opening the batting for Griqualand West, he scored 145 and 8 against Rhodesia, and 129 and 177 against Border, the first time anyone had scored a century in each innings in the Currie Cup. In each of these two matches he reached a century before lunch on the first day. They were his last first-class centuries. In his last first-class match, against Transvaal B in 1959–60, he made 39 out of Griqualand West's first-innings total of 77. His younger brother Errol played for Eastern Province in 1951–52 and for Griqualand West from 1953–54 to 1967–68.

With the death of compatriot John Watkins on 3 September 2021, Draper became the oldest living Test cricketer. Draper died at a retirement home in Gqeberha, on 25 February 2025, at the age of 98.

Records
| Preceded by John Watkins | Oldest living Test cricketer 3 September 2021 – 25 February 2025 | Succeeded by Neil Harvey |
