= Nevill Vintcent =

South African aviator (1902–1942)

Nevill Vintcent OBE DFC (1902 – 29 January 1942) was a South African aviator and airline founder. He was the son of Charles Vintcent, a South African cricketer.

== Early life ==
Nevill Vintcent, a South African, born in 1902, entered Osborne in 1916, proceeded to the Royal Naval College, Dartmouth, and served in HMS Temeraire for a few months during the Great War. In 1920 he went to the Royal Air Force College Cranwell with the first course, was commissioned in the RAF in 1922, and served in Kurdistan, Transjordania, Egypt, and Iraq, where he won the DFC in unusual circumstances when he, with a brother officer, had made a forced landing in hostile country. To enable his co-pilot to fire the guns of the aeroplane and beat off the attacks of Arab horsemen, he carried the tail of the aeroplane on his shoulder, and throughout a prolonged engagement swung the aircraft into position for firing until help arrived.

== Pilot ==
For a time he served as a pilot at the RAF Aeroplane & Armament Experimental Establishment (A&AEE) at Martlesham Heath. Convinced of the great future of civil aviation, he left the RAF in 1926 and engaged in air survey work in India, Burma, the Federated Malay States and Borneo, and he flew the first air mail from Borneo to the Straits Settlements.

== India ==
In 1928 he, with a partner, undertook one of the early long-distance pioneer flights, when they flew two de Havilland DH.9 aeroplanes from England to India. For two years he was engaged with spreading the gospel of aviation in India, and his contact with Mr. J.R.D. Tata, of Tata Sons Ltd, gave birth to Tata Airlines.

Nevill Vintcent and J.R.D. Tata together pioneered the air mail service from London to the sub-continent. On 8 October 1932, an Imperial Airways aircraft flew from London to Karachi. J R D Tata, in a de Havilland Puss Moth took the mail on to Bombay, where Nevill Vintcent then took over for the leg to Madras, arriving on 16 October. The first westbound flight left Madras the following day.

On 25 February 1935 Vintcent made an inaugural flight from Bombay to Nagpur to Jamshedpur and on to Calcutta with a de Havilland Fox Moth. They built one of the two air transport companies which, before the 1939-45 war, built the foundation of air transport in India, and during the war rendered invaluable assistance to the RAF in operating scheduled air transport services and in such operations as the carriage of troops to Iraq, the evacuation of women and children from Habbaniyah, and later from Burma.

== Own flight ==
For his work in the organization of air transport in India he was made an O.B.E. in 1938. The approach of war in Europe impressed upon Vintcent and others the strategic need for an aircraft factory in India, and thereafter to that end his mind and activities were more and more concentrated. In 1940, simultaneously with the Government of India's decision to establish the Hindustan aircraft factory at Bangalore with American assistance, Vintcent visited the United States and England and obtained the promise of a contract for the construction of training aircraft in India as an initial programme for the Tata aircraft factory. Shipping and other difficulties, however, delayed the building, equipping, and manning of an aircraft factory in India. But in 1941 Vintcent flew to England at the request of Lord Beaverbrook, then Minister of Aircraft Production and obtained a contract for the construction of troop-carrying gliders, and set about the organization of the company and the building of the factory at Poona.

Vintcent, anxious to lose no time, set out on his return to India on 29 January 1942. With the irony of fate, of all the numerous personnel who were sent to India by air and sea to establish this enterprise, he alone was lost on the way out. The outbreak of war with Japan revealed how invaluable an established aircraft industry in India, even on a small scale, would then have been; but it was too late for India to make any contribution in the production of aircraft. The Tata aircraft factories as well as the Hindustan aircraft factory were switched over to the repair and overhaul of aircraft for the air forces.

In 1942, Vintcent set out on a flight to India to put into effect a plan for which he had fought long and tenaciously - the establishment of an aircraft factory in India. The RAF Hudson in which he had been given a place in the crew to expedite his return disappeared without trace after taking off from a Cornish aerodrome. While officially there was no further information, it is known that other RAF aircraft were attacked by enemy aircraft in the mouth of the English Channel that day, and among his friends it was presumed that Vintcent was shot down in that vicinity.
