= Michael Doherty (legal scholar) =

Michael Doherty SFHEA is professor of law at Lancaster University. He is a former chairman of the Association of Law Teachers, and a Senior Fellow of the Higher Education Academy.

== Selected publications ==
- Public Law. 2nd edition, Routledge, 2018. ISBN 9781138504936
