= Arthur Seccull =

South African cricketer (1868–1945)

Personal information
- Full name: Arthur William Seccull
- Born: 14 September 1868; King William's Town, Cape Colony
- Died: 20 July 1945 (aged 76); Johannesburg, Transvaal, Union of South Africa
- Batting: Right-handed
- Bowling: Right-arm medium

International information
- National side: South Africa

Career statistics
| Competition | Tests | First-class |
|---|---|---|
| Matches | 1 | 7 |
| Runs scored | 23 | 229 |
| Batting average | 23.00 | 22.90 |
| 100s/50s | 0/0 | 0/2 |
| Top score | 17* | 64 |
| Balls bowled | 60 | 685 |
| Wickets | 2 | 15 |
| Bowling average | 18.50 | 16.86 |
| 5 wickets in innings | 0 | 1 |
| 10 wickets in match | 0 | 0 |
| Best bowling | 2/37 | 6/48 |
| Catches/stumpings | 1/- | 4/- |
- Source: Cricinfo

Arthur William Seccull (14 September 1868 – 20 July 1945) was a cricketer who played one Test match for South Africa in 1896.

== Cricket career ==
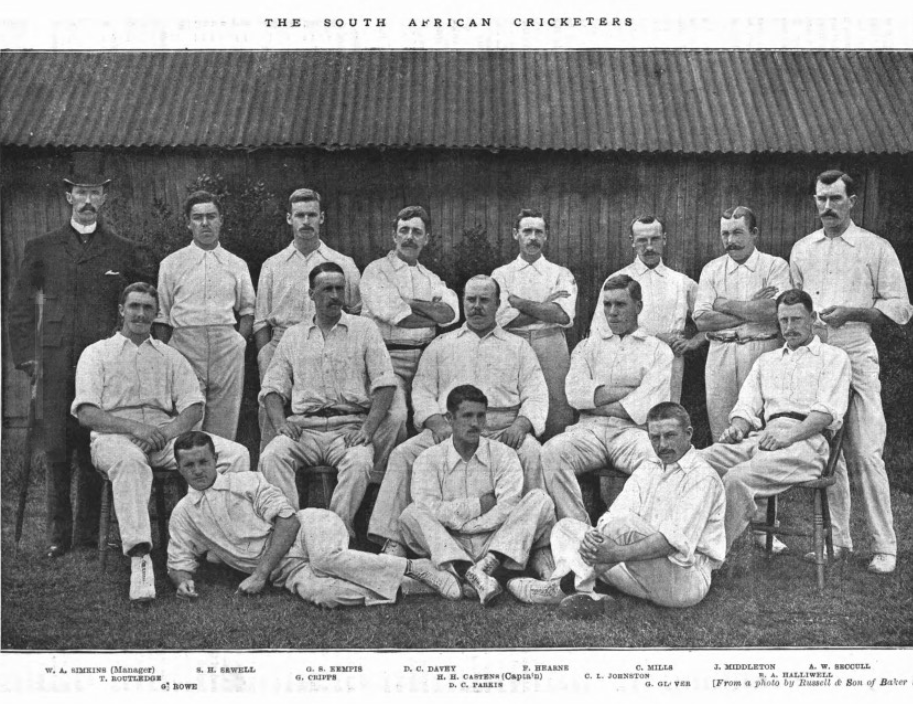
The South African team that toured England in 1894. Arthur Seccull is standing at the far right.

An all-rounder, Seccull was a member of the first South African team to tour England in 1894. No Tests or first-class matches were played on the tour. He scored 355 runs with a top score of 63 against Glamorgan, when he made the highest score in the match, but took only four wickets on the tour.

In South Africa in 1895–96 he played in the Third Test at Cape Town against the England side under Lord Hawke, scoring 6 and 17 not out and taking two wickets for 37 runs.

Seccull's provincial cricket in South Africa was mainly for Transvaal, though he also appeared for Kimberley and Western Province. He played in consecutive Currie Cup-winning finals for different teams. In the first, in 1893–94, he took his best first-class bowling figures of 6 for 48 in the second innings to help Western Province to an innings victory in the final against Natal. A year later he made his highest first-class score of 64, the highest score in the match, to help Transvaal to victory over Western Province.
