= Edward Budgen =

South African cricketer (1884–1962)

Personal information
- Full name: Edward Albert Budgen
- Born: 9 December 1884; Heidelberg, Transvaal Republic
- Died: 6 October 1962 (aged 77); Port Elizabeth, Cape Province, South Africa
- Batting: Right-handed
- Bowling: Right-arm medium-pace

Domestic team information
- Years: Team
- 1908/09–1919/20: Western Province
- 1921/22–1925/26: Orange Free State
- 1922/23: Griqualand West

Career statistics
Competition	First-class
Matches	25
Runs scored	275
Batting average	7.23
100s/50s	0/0
Top score	43
Balls bowled	4,825
Wickets	110
Bowling average	22.31
5 wickets in innings	8
10 wickets in match	2
Best bowling	8/107
Catches/stumpings	12/–
- Source: Cricinfo, 30 April 2023

Edward Albert Budgen (9 December 1884 – 6 October 1962) was a South African cricketer who played first-class cricket between 1909 and 1926. He played for South Africa, but not in Test cricket.

A right-arm medium-pace bowler, Budgen had an outstanding match for Western Province in the 1910–11 Currie Cup, taking 4 for 26 and 7 for 30 (the last seven wickets of the match) in the innings victory over Griqualand West. When the Australian Imperial Force Touring XI played Western Province in October 1919, Budgen took 7 for 70 (all of them bowled) in the first innings of the match, which the Australians won by two wickets. A month later he was selected to play for South Africa in the second of the two matches against the AIF XI, and took two wickets, but the Australians won by an innings.

Budgen took his best first-class figures in the 1921–22 season. Playing for Orange Free State in a Currie Cup match against Natal, he took 4 for 63 and 8 for 107, and Orange Free State won by 42 runs.
