= John Helfrich =

Rev. Johannes Helfrich (Weisenberg, PA, 1 January 1795 – 1852) was an American pastor and co-founder of the first homeopathic medical school in the United States at Allentown, Pennsylvania.

He was the son of Rev. Johann Henrich Helffrich, originally of Mosbach (Baden).
