= Charles Vintcent =

South African cricket player (1866–1943)

Personal information
- Born: 2 September 1866; Mossel Bay, Cape Colony
- Died: 28 September 1943 (aged 77); George, Cape Province
- Batting: Left-handed
- Bowling: Left-arm medium-fast

International information
- National side: South Africa
- Test debut (cap 11): 12 March 1889 v England
- Last Test: 19 March 1892 v England

Career statistics
Competition	Test	First-class
Matches	3	6
Runs scored	26	119
Batting average	4.33	11.90
100s/50s	0/0	0/1
Top score	9	60*
Balls bowled	369	730
Wickets	4	10
Bowling average	48.25	36.39
5 wickets in innings	0	0
10 wickets in match	0	0
Best bowling	3/88	4/70
Catches/stumpings	1/–	2/–
- Source: Cricinfo, 10 September 2022

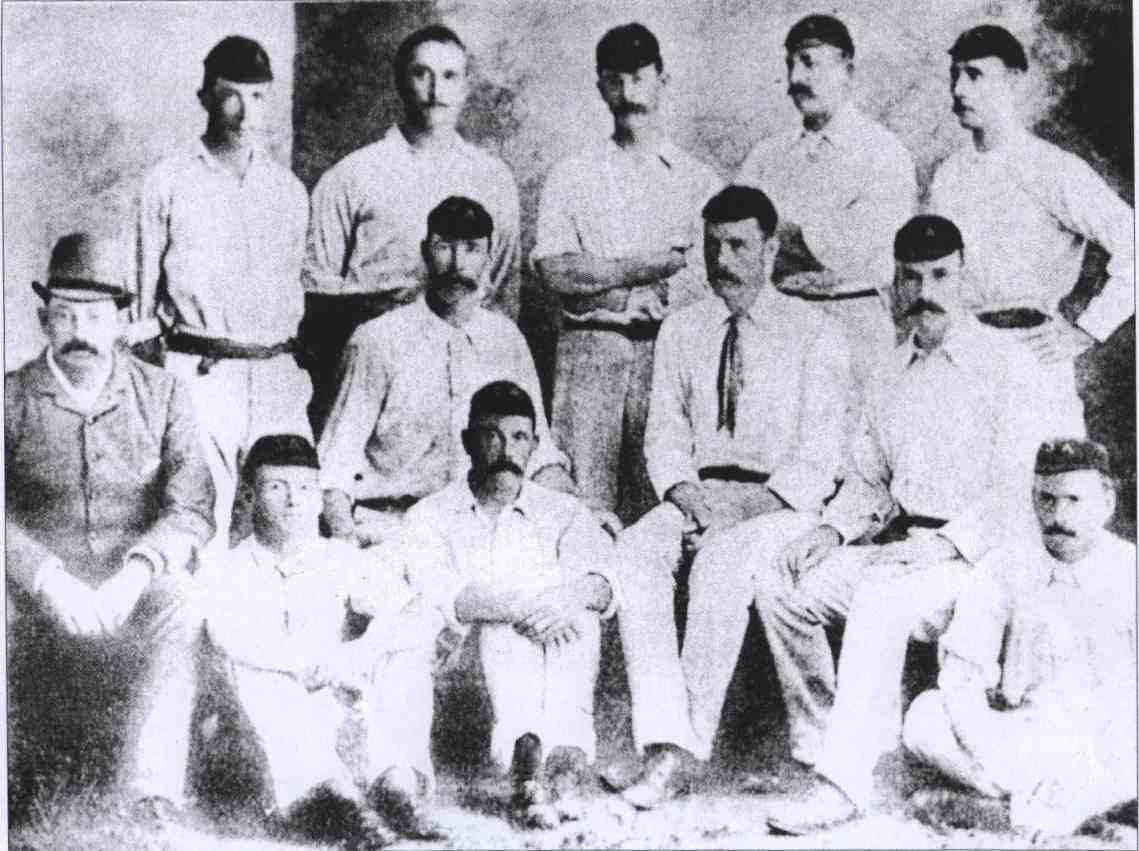
The South African side for its first Test, against England at Port Elizabeth. Vintcent is back row, second from right.

Charles Henry Vintcent (2 September 1866 – 28 September 1943) was a South African cricketer who played in three Test matches from 1889 to 1892.

Born in Mossel Bay and educated in Cape Town and then Charterhouse School, England, Charlie Vintcent played numerous different sports at a high level. He played rugby for both Western Province and Transvaal. He obtained his national colours for football, and he was the Transvaal sprint champion in the events from the 100 yards to 440 yards for three years from 1889 to 1891. He also competed at both the long and high jump events during that time. Charlie was a left-handed all-rounder who played in both Tests in the first Home Series against England as well as the only Test of the 1891–92 series against the second English touring side. He owed his original selection to his performance for Kimberley in the fifth match of the tour. He enjoyed a long career in provincial cricket which lasted some twenty seasons, playing first an important role for Transvaal in the early Currie Cup fixtures, and then when he returned to the Southern Cape, he captained them in their only appearance at provincial level.

== Family ==
He married Lilian Jackson and they had three children, among them Nevill Vintcent, joint founder of the airline that went on to become Air India.

His elder brother, Joseph, won the FA Cup with Old Carthusians in 1881.
