= Mike Doherty (cricketer) =

South African former cricketer

Personal information
- Full name: Michael John Desmond Doherty
- Born: 14 March 1947 (age 79); Vryburg, Cape Province, South Africa
- Batting: Left-handed
- Bowling: Right-arm off break; Right-arm medium

Domestic team information
- Years: Team
- 1964/65–1984/85: Griqualand West
- 1984/85: Impalas

Career statistics
Competition	First-class	List A
Matches	85	18
Runs scored	5,238	507
Batting average	34.92	28.16
100s/50s	12/23	0/3
Top score	130*	92
Balls bowled	4,067	312
Wickets	59	9
Bowling average	28.16	29.11
5 wickets in innings	2	0
10 wickets in match	0	0
Best bowling	5/25	3/61
Catches/stumpings	40/–	12/–
- Source: CricketArchive, 21 February 2025

Michael John Desmond Doherty (born 14 March 1947) is a South African former cricketer. He spent a 21-year career with the Griqualand West cricket team between 1965 and 1985. Named one of the cricketers of the year in 1972 by the South African Cricket Annual, Doherty recorded 12 centuries as a left-handed batter and two five-wicket hauls as a right-handed bowler that could bowl either off break or medium pace. After his retirement, he served as chairman of Griqualand West and also spent time as the manager of the South Africa national cricket team.

== Early career ==
Born in Vryburg on 14 March 1947, Doherty debuted in first-class cricket shortly before turning eighteen, on 29 January 1965, as part of a Griqualand West team that took on the touring England side. Batting third in both innings, Doherty was limited to one run and six runs in his first and second innings, respectively, as the touring side won by ten wickets. He debuted in the Currie Cup the following season, appearing in two matches for Griqualand West and scoring ten runs total. After not being chosen by the province in the 1966/67 campaign, he returned to their side the following season for two more matches.

During the 1968/69 Currie Cup, Doherty recorded his first century, scoring 102 runs in the second innings of a match with North Eastern Transvaal. He added his first five-wicket haul in a Currie Cup match during the 1969/70 season, taking five wickets for 25 runs, ultimately a career best, against a Natal B side. That year also featured South Africa's inaugural one-day competition, the Gillette Cup; in Doherty's first match in the format, he recorded what would be his best bowling in official one-day matches, three wickets (in seven overs) for 61 runs, and scored 39 as a batter in a losing effort.

== Middle career ==
Doherty continued to be successful at the start of the 1970s, recording 352 runs and a batting average of 44.00 in the 1970/71 season. Despite playing in one fewer match and having three fewer innings as a batter in the 1971/72 campaign, he improved on both numbers that year, scoring 388 runs, aided by four half-centuries, with an average of 64.66. In that season's Gillette Cup, he scored a career-best 92 runs in a one-day match against Orange Free State. For his efforts, the South African Cricket Annual named him one of their cricketers of the year for 1972.

Following a performance in the 1972/73 Currie Cup in line with his career average, and an off-year the following season, he returned to form during the 1974/75 campaign, scoring 489 runs in five matches. Among his 489 runs were two centuries, one of which, an unbeaten 130 against Northern Transvaal, (Note: Northern Transvaal is the same team as North Eastern Transvaal, having been renamed in 1971.) was his career-best total in a first-class match. After nearly reaching 400 runs again in the 1975/76 campaign, Doherty struggled over the following season as his average fell to 21.

== Late career ==
In 1977, Doherty's Griqualand West team were moved into a new first-class competition, the Castle Bowl, which his side remained in for the rest of his career. The format of the 1977/78 Bowl meant that only four matches were played by Doherty's side; (Note: During the 1977/78 Castle Bowl, nine teams were split into three, double round-robin groups.) playing in three of them, his average increased by less than a run from his last Currie Cup campaign. While not performing well as a batter, he managed his second five-wicket haul against Northern Transvaal in a match that straddled the end of 1977 and the beginning of 1978. After the Bowl returned to a six-match schedule in the 1978/79 season, Doherty once again found success with his batting, reaching 500 runs in a season for the first time, and also took 11 wickets as a bowler, the most he would take in a single season. He continued having success with the bat over the next two years before he reached his peak numbers during the 1981/82 campaign. His 556 runs were a seasonal best, while his 69.50 average led all South African first-class cricketers, with a minimum of five innings as a batter, that season.

His final three seasons were less successful, as he was limited to a pair of matches in 1982/83 and failed to score a half-century in both 1983/84 and the 1984/85 campaign. In that 1984/85 season, Doherty was a member of the Impalas cricket team for its inaugural campaign in the Benson and Hedges Series. He appeared in four matches for the Impalas with a high score of 28 runs in an innings and 69 runs overall. He ended his first-class career with 5,238 runs and 59 wickets, and his one-day career with 507 runs and nine wickets.

== Post-playing career and personal life ==
Doherty has worked with the United Cricket Board (UCB) in various roles. He had a stint as team manager of the South Africa national cricket team, including during a four-team One Day International series in Kenya in the 1996/97 season that South Africa won. Also a member of the UCB general council, he unsuccessfully ran for vice president of the UCB in 2000.

He was a life member of Griqualand West's board of directors. During the 1990s, he was chairman of their board at the time when they returned to the Currie Cup fold after 19 seasons in second-tier competitions. (Note: While still considered first-class, South Africa's Bowl competitions were of lesser caliber than the Currie Cup.) He also was chairman when they won the Standard Bank Cup in 1999, the first trophy won by the province since winning the Currie Cup over a century prior.

Doherty has a son, Allan, who played provincial cricket for Griqualand West in the mid-2000s. A grandson, Liam, represented Ireland in the 2022 Under-19 Men's Cricket World Cup.
