= Dudley Helfrich =

South African cricketer

Personal information
- Full name: Dudley George Helfrich
- Born: 17 May 1912; Kimberley, Cape Province, South Africa
- Died: 13 June 1980 (aged 68); Witbank, Transvaal, South Africa
- Relatives: Basil Helfrich (brother); Cyril Helfrich (brother); Kenneth Helfrich (brother)

Domestic team information
- Years: Team
- 1929/30–1934/35: Griqualand West
- 1936/37: Transvaal
- 1937/38–1939/40: North-Eastern Transvaal

Career statistics
| Competition | First-class |
|---|---|
| Matches | 28 |
| Runs scored | 1,301 |
| Batting average | 25.01 |
| 100s/50s | 0/10 |
| Top score | 92 |
| Balls bowled | 669 |
| Wickets | 12 |
| Bowling average | 28.58 |
| 5 wickets in innings | 0 |
| 10 wickets in match | 0 |
| Best bowling | 3/87 |
| Catches/stumpings | 11/1 |
- Source: Cricinfo, 7 July 2017

Dudley George Helfrich (17 May 1912 – 13 June 1980) was a South African cricketer who played first-class cricket for Griqualand West, Transvaal and North-Eastern Transvaal between 1929 and 1940. He was the eldest of four brothers who played first-class cricket in South Africa.

He opened the batting in North-Eastern Transvaal's first first-class match in 1937–38. In their second match he hit his highest score, 92, against his former team Transvaal, in North-Eastern Transvaal's first first-class victory.
