= Cyril Helfrich =

South African cricketer (1924–2002)

Personal information
- Full name: Cyril Desmond Helfrich
- Born: 21 May 1924; Kimberley, Cape Province, South Africa
- Died: 23 March 2002 (aged 77); East London, Eastern Cape, South Africa
- Batting: Right-handed
- Bowling: Right-arm medium
- Relatives: Dudley Helfrich (brother); Basil Helfrich (brother); Kenneth Helfrich (brother)

Domestic team information
- Years: Team
- 1945/46–1957/58: Griqualand West

Career statistics
Competition	First-class
Matches	47
Runs scored	2,611
Batting average	31.84
100s/50s	6/13
Top score	165
Balls bowled	2,665
Wickets	29
Bowling average	47.55
5 wickets in innings	0
10 wickets in match	0
Best bowling	3/79
Catches/stumpings	34/–
- Source: Cricinfo, 25 March 2020

Cyril Desmond Helfrich (21 May 1924 – 23 March 2002) was a South African cricketer who played first-class cricket for Griqualand West between 1945 and 1958. He was one of four brothers who played first-class cricket in South Africa.

A middle-order batsman and occasional medium-pace bowler, Cyril Helfrich had his most successful season in 1950–51, when he was one of only five batsmen to score 500 runs in the Currie Cup. He made 524 runs at an average of 52.40, including his highest first-class score of 165 in the match against Eastern Province, when he went to the wicket with the score at 27 for 3. At the end of the season he played in a trial match to help the selectors choose the team to tour England that year, but he was unsuccessful.

Helfrich was particularly successful in Griqualand West's matches against touring teams. He top-scored for them in the match against MCC in 1948–49 with 71 in the first innings, scored 77 against the Australians a year later, and made a quick 55 not out in a run-chase against the New Zealanders in 1953–54. He also took five wickets against the New Zealanders. In his last first-class innings he made 23 when Griqualand West were dismissed for 69 by the Australians in 1957-58.
