= Bob Snedden =

South African international rugby union player and cricketer

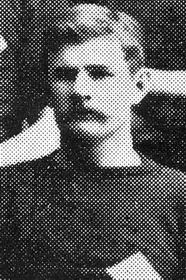
- Born: Robert Campbell Ditchburn Snedden; 20 March 1867 Dunfermline, Fife, Scotland
- Died: 3 April 1931 (aged 64) Liskeard, Cornwall
- Height: 1.78 m (5 ft 10 in)
- Weight: 85 kg (13 st 5 lb)

Rugby union career
- Position: Forward
Provincial / State sides
Years	Team	Apps	(Points)
- Griqualand West
International career
Years	Team	Apps	(Points)
1891	South Africa	1	
- Correct as of 15 October 2007

Robert Campbell Ditchburn Snedden (20 March 1867 – 3 April 1931) was a Scottish-born South African rugby union footballer.

== Biography ==
Snedden played only one Test for South Africa, in which he was captain, in 1891. He played for the Griqualand West province.

The British Isles rugby team embarked on a tour of South Africa in 1891, the season in which South Africa's national side would play its first ever match. Snedden did not play in the first Test, but was promoted into the lineup for the second match, and was named as skipper. He captained South Africa on 29 August 1891 against the British Isles in Kimberley. Only one drop goal from mark was scored in the game, by Great Britain, who won the contest 3 to nil. Snedden did not play in any more Tests for South Africa. He died in Liskeard, England in 1931, aged 64.

He was also a good enough cricketer to play a first-class match for Griqualand West in the 1889/90 season.

=== Test history ===
No.	Opponents	Results(SA 1st)	Position	Tries	Date	Venue
1.	(United Kingdom) British Isles	0–3	Forward (c)		29 Aug 1891	Eclectic Cricket Ground, Kimberley

== See also ==
- List of South Africa national rugby union players – Springbok no. 18
- List of South Africa national rugby union team captains

Sporting positions
Preceded by H.H. Castens	Springbok Captain; 1891	Succeeded by Alf Richards
