= Basil Helfrich =

South African cricketer

Personal information
- Full name: Basil Arthur Helfrich
- Born: 30 March 1919; South Africa
- Died: 6 March 1938 (aged 18); Kimberley, Cape Province, South Africa
- Batting: Right-handed
- Relatives: Dudley Helfrich (brother); Cyril Helfrich (brother); Kenneth Helfrich (brother)

Domestic team information
- Years: Team
- 1934/35–1937/38: Griqualand West

Career statistics
| Competition | First-class |
|---|---|
| Matches | 13 |
| Runs scored | 626 |
| Batting average | 27.21 |
| 100s/50s | 1/4 |
| Top score | 109 |
| Balls bowled | 609 |
| Wickets | 14 |
| Bowling average | 23.57 |
| 5 wickets in innings | 0 |
| 10 wickets in match | 0 |
| Best bowling | 3/31 |
| Catches/stumpings | 9/– |
- Source: Cricinfo, 3 July 2017

Basil Arthur Helfrich (30 March 1919 – 6 March 1938) was a South African cricketer who showed great promise as a teenager but died at the age of 18. He was one of four brothers who played first-class cricket in South Africa.

== Life and career ==
Basil Helfrich lived in Kimberley, where he made his first-class debut in March 1935 a few days before his 16th birthday, playing for Griqualand West in a victory over Western Province. Also in the Griqualand West team were John Waddington, who had made his debut earlier in the season a few days younger than Helfrich and would play for Griqualand West for another 24 years; Tony Harris, 18 years old, who would play Test cricket for South Africa after World War II; and Helfrich's elder brother Dudley, who had made his debut five seasons earlier at the age of 17.

As he was still at school, Helfrich played only home matches in his first two seasons. In 1935–36 he top-scored with 66 in the match against Orange Free State, and then top-scored in both innings of the match against the touring Australians, making 64 and 59 when none of his team-mates were able to reach 25. In the second innings he was so severe on the bowling of Bill O'Reilly that O'Reilly was taken out of the attack. The Australian batsman Jack Fingleton thought Helfrich "was bound to become an international", as did the South African sports journalist Louis Duffus.

Helfrich played the full seasons of 1936–37 and 1937–38. In 1936–37 he made his only century, 109 against Transvaal, and appeared for a strong South African team in a first-class match against City of Johannesburg. His batting form fell away in 1937–38. During the season, just after scoring 120 not out in 80 minutes in a club match in Kimberley, he was struck down with enteric fever, and died a few weeks later, just short of his 19th birthday. Griqualand West's match against North-Eastern Transvaal was abandoned after the second day's play when news came of his death.

Besides his batting, Helfrich was a noted fieldsman and a useful slow bowler. He also excelled at Rugby union and swimming.
