= Charlie Finlason =

English-born South African cricketer

Personal information
- Born: 19 February 1860; Camberwell, Surrey, England
- Died: 31 July 1917 (aged 57); Surbiton, Surrey, England
- Batting: Right-handed
- Bowling: Right-arm off-break

International information
- National side: South Africa
- Only Test (cap 2): 12 March 1889 v England

Domestic team information
- Years: Team
- 1890: Transvaal (now Gauteng)
- 1890–1891: Griqualand West (or Kimberley)

Career statistics
Competition	Test	FC
Matches	1	5
Runs scored	6	213
Batting average	3.00	26.62
100s/50s	0/0	1/0
Top score	6	154*
Balls bowled	12	694
Wickets	0	14
Bowling average	n/a	20.50
5 wickets in innings	0	0
10 wickets in match	0	0
Best bowling	0/7	4/37
Catches/stumpings	0/–	2/–
- Source: CricketArchive, 27 December 2014

Charles Edward Finlason (19 February 1860 – 31 July 1917) played a single match of Test cricket for the South African national side, against England in March 1889.

Finlason was born in Camberwell, London, and died in Surbiton, London. He played first-class cricket in South Africa for Griqualand West (also known as Kimberley at the time) and Transvaal between 1888 and 1891. In 1889, he played a single Test match for South Africa against England, scoring six runs across two innings and failing to take a wicket.

In April 1891, Finlason recorded his single first-class century, for Griqualand West against the Transvaal in the second season of the Currie Cup. The match, at the Wanderers ground in Johannesburg, was designated "timeless", and finished with a Griqualand West victory after six days of play spread over a week. Finlason scored 154 not out in Griqualand West's second innings. He featured in a 95-run tenth-wicket partnership with Alfred Cooper, who finished with 41 runs. As of December 2014, this remains a record for the last wicket for Griqualand West.

Later, Finlason described an expedition as a newspaperman to Salisbury, Rhodesia by ox-drawn cart in his 1893 book A Nobody in Mashonaland.

== Other reading ==
- Finlayson [sic], C. E. (1893). A Nobody in Mashonaland. Unknown publisher. Reprinted in 1970 as Rhodesiana Reprint Library: First (Gold) Series, Volume 9 ISBN 0-86920-016-X (standard) and ISBN 0-86920-017-8 (de luxe).
- Frindall, Bill, ed. (1979). The Wisden Book of Test Cricket, Volume 1 1877–1977. London: MacDonald & Jane's. ISBN 978-0354085359.
- Bailey, Philip; Thorn, Philip; Wynne-Thomas, Peter (1993). Who's Who of Cricketers. London: Hamlyn. ISBN 978-0600577294. 2nd edition.
- Martin-Jenkins, Christopher (1996). World Cricketers: A Biographical Dictionary. Oxford: Oxford University Press. ISBN 978-0192100054.
