= Kenneth Helfrich =

South African cricketer (1927–1982)

Personal information
- Born: 28 March 1927; Kimberley, Cape Province, South Africa
- Died: 15 February 1982 (aged 54); Johannesburg, Transvaal, South Africa
- Batting: Right-handed
- Bowling: Right-arm leg-spin
- Relatives: Dudley Helfrich (brother); Basil Helfrich (brother); Cyril Helfrich (brother)

Domestic team information
- Years: Team
- 1949/50–1952/53: Griqualand West
- 1956/57–1957/58: North-Eastern Transvaal
- 1959/60: Griqualand West

Career statistics
| Competition | First-class |
|---|---|
| Matches | 8 |
| Runs scored | 251 |
| Batting average | 20.91 |
| 100s/50s | 0/2 |
| Top score | 87 |
| Balls bowled | 280 |
| Wickets | 7 |
| Bowling average | 27.00 |
| 5 wickets in innings | 1 |
| 10 wickets in match | 0 |
| Best bowling | 5/46 |
| Catches/stumpings | 4/– |
- Source: Cricinfo, 26 March 2020

Kenneth Helfrich (28 March 1927 – 15 February 1982) was a South African cricketer who played first-class cricket for Griqualand West and North-Eastern Transvaal between 1950 and 1959. He was the youngest of four brothers who all played first-class cricket.

Helfrich played irregularly in first-class cricket: eight matches in 11 seasons. In his second match he made 87 and took 5 for 46 for Griqualand West against Eastern Province. In 1956–57, in his first match for North-Eastern Transvaal, he scored 71 in a team total of 125 against the touring MCC; Wisden noted: "Helfrich, who batted without gloves, made several fine drives in a stay of two and a half hours. Extras was the next best score."
