= George Glover (cricketer) =

South African cricketer

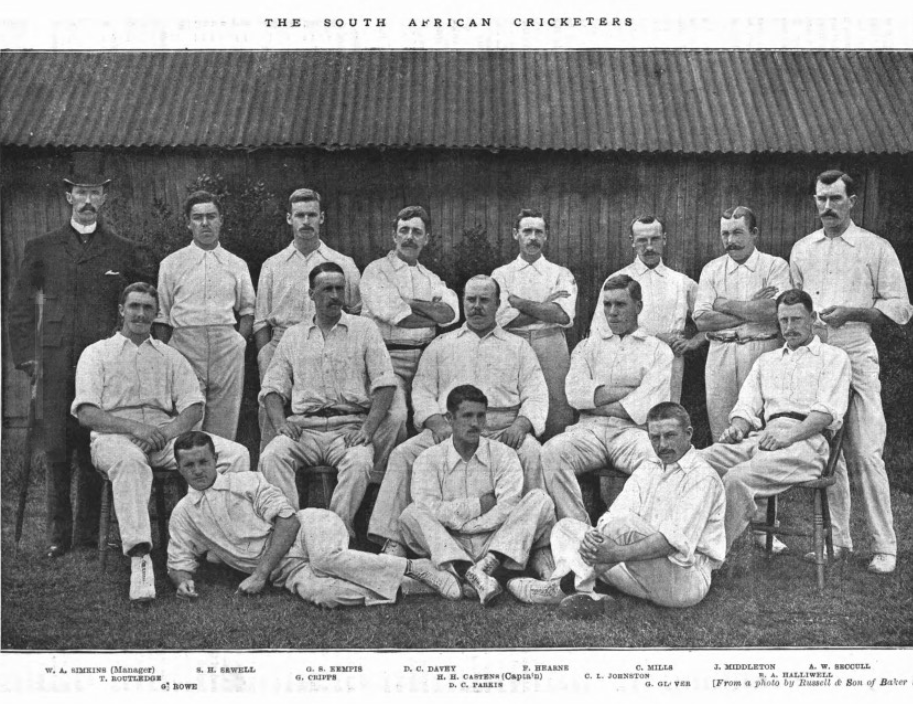
- The South African team in 1894. George Glover is in front on the ground, on the right.

Personal information
- Full name: George Keyworth Glover
- Born: 13 May 1870; Wakefield, Yorkshire, England
- Died: 15 November 1938 (aged 68); Kimberley, Cape Province, South Africa
- Batting: Right-handed
- Bowling: Right-arm offbreak
- Role: All-rounder

International information
- National side: South Africa

Domestic team information
- Years: Team
- 1890/91–1897/98: Griqualand West

Career statistics
Competition	Tests	First-class
Matches	1	16
Runs scored	21	621
Batting average	21.00	23.88
100s/50s	0/0	0/4
Top score	18*	78
Balls bowled	65	2742
Wickets	1	71
Bowling average	28.00	18.15
5 wickets in innings	0	5
10 wickets in match	0	2
Best bowling	1/28	8/35
Catches/stumpings	0/–	10/–
- Source: Cricinfo, 4 February 2021

George Keyworth Glover (13 May 1870 – 15 November 1938) was a South African cricketer who played in one Test in 1896.

Glover was born in Yorkshire, and his family moved to South Africa when he was young. A middle-order batsman and off-spin bowler, he was a prominent player in Currie Cup cricket for Griqualand West in the 1890s. In Griqualand West's victory over Eastern Province in 1893–94 he took 8 for 35 and 7 for 33, bowling unchanged through both innings. He captained Griqualand West in 1896–97 and 1897–98, taking 4 for 50 and 6 for 49 when they beat Border in 1897–98. In the loss to Western Province in 1892-93 he scored 78 (his highest score) and 27 and took 3 for 82 and 5 for 94.

He toured England on South Africa's tour in 1894, when no first-class matches were played, scoring 377 runs at an average of 13.96 and taking 56 wickets at 17.71. When the 1895-96 English touring team played Griqualand West he took 6 for 75 in the second innings despite having a number of catches dropped off his bowling, and Griqualand West lost by only 13 runs. He was selected in the South African team for the Third and final Test of the series which followed shortly afterwards, but he was not successful, and England won by an innings.

A farmer, Glover lived in Kimberley, where he died suddenly in November 1938.
