= List of cricket grounds in South Africa =

This is a list of cricket grounds in South Africa. The list includes all grounds that have been used for Test, One Day International, Twenty20 International, first-class, List A and Twenty20 cricket matches. Grounds that have hosted men's international cricket games are listed in bold.

== List of cricket grounds ==
Ground Name	Location	Team	First Used	Last Used	First-Class Games	List A Games	Twenty20 Games	Notes
Brackenfell Sports Fields	Brackenfell	Boland	1989–90	1994–95	13	2	0	
Bredasdrop Cricket Ground	Bredasdorp	Boland	1992–93		1	0	0	Hosted one first-class game between Boland and Border in 1992.
**Boland Park**	Paarl	Boland	1994–95	2010–11	82	111	4	Hosted eight ODIs
Paarl Cricket Club Ground	Paarl	Boland	1994–95	1994–95	4	0	0	
Callie de Wet Sportsground	Robertson	Boland	1990–91		1	0	0	Hosted one first-class match between Boland and Eastern Province in 1990.
Danie Craven Stadium	Stellenbosch	Boland	1987–88	1993–94	0	10	0	
Stellenbosch Farmers Winery Ground	Stellenbosch	Boland	1975–76	1990–91	36	14	0	
Stellenbosch University Ground No. 1	Stellenbosch	Boland	1978–79	2010–11	13	6	0	
Van der Stel Cricket Club Ground	Stellenbosch	Boland	2009–10		1	0	0	
Vredenburg Park	Vredenburg	Boland	1993–94		0	1	0	
Boland Park	Worcester	Boland	1990–91	1993–94	3	0	0	
Ntselamanzi	Alice	Border	2000–01		0	1	0	Referred to as "Place of Water".
**Buffalo Park**	East London	Border	1988–89	2010–11	122	144	12	Hosted Test, ODI and Twenty20 International matches.
Cambridge Recreation Ground	East London	Border	1947–48	1947–48	3	0	0	Hosted three of Border's Currie Cup matches in the 1947–48 season.
Jan Smuts Ground	East London	Border	1906–07	1987–88	152	18	0	
Schoeman Sports Ground	East London	Border	2004–05	2010–11	6	7	0	
The Feathers	East London	Border	1993–94	1993–94	1	1	0	
Victoria Ground	King William's Town	Border	1903–04	1991–92	13	8	0	
Sandringham Ground	Queenstown	Border	1992–93	1994–95	2	1	0	
Victoria Recreation Ground	Queenstown	Border	1906–07	1962–63	6	0	0	
Standard Cricket Club Ground	Cradock	Eastern Province	1984–85	1990–91	2	1		
Despatch Cricket Ground	Despatch	Eastern Province	2009–10		0	1	0	Hosted one match in 2009 between Eastern Province and KZN Inland.
Botanical Cricket Ground	Graaff-Reinet	Eastern Province	1991–92		0	1	0	
Albany Sports Club	Grahamstown	Eastern Province	1985–86		1	0	0	
City Lords	Grahamstown	Eastern Province	1924–25		1	0	0	Hosted one match in 1925 between Eastern Province and SB Joel's XI.
Prospect Field at Rhodes University	Grahamstown	Eastern Province	1980–81	1993–94	3	1	0	No longer used for cricket.
Great Field at Rhodes University	Grahamstown	Eastern Province	1973–74	1977–78	2	0	0	
Adock Stadium	Korsten, Port Elizabeth	Eastern Province	2000–01		0	1	0	
Adcock Stadium	Port Elizabeth	Eastern Province	1971–72	1990–91	46	0	0	
Gelvandale Stadium	Port Elizabeth	Eastern Province	1975–76	1975–76	3	0	0	
Kemsley Park	Port Elizabeth	Eastern Province	1979–80	2006–07	13	1	0	
Pollock Field	Port Elizabeth	Eastern Province	1994–95	2006–07	3	2	0	Name after the cricketers Peter and Graeme Pollock, notable alumni of Grey High School
**St George's Park**	Port Elizabeth	Eastern Province	1888–89	2010–11	343	215	30	Hosted Test, ODI and Twenty20 International matches.
Union Ground, St George's Park	Port Elizabeth	Eastern Province	1951–52	1986–87	8	0	0	
University of Port Elizabeth No. 1 Ground	Port Elizabeth	Eastern Province	1982–93	2009–10	15	4	0	
Wolfson Stadium	Port Elizabeth	Eastern Province	1987–88		1	0	0	
Uitenhage Cricket Club 'A' Ground	Uitenhage	Eastern Province	1981–82	1988–89	9	0	0	
Dan Qeqe Stadium	Port Elizabeth	Eastern Province	1978–79	1988–89	4	0	0	Named after Dan Qeqe.
Lord's Cricket Ground	Benoni	Easterns	1981–82	1982–83	2	0	0	
**Willowmoore Park**	Benoni	Easterns	1923–24	2010–11	115	107	4	Hosted 18 ODIs.
Barnard Stadium	Kempton Park	Easterns	1989–90		0	1	0	Hosted one List A match in 1989 between Eastern Transvaal and Orange Free State.
Olympia Park	Springs, South Africa	Easterns	1937–38	1994–95	4	0	0	
PAM Brink Stadium	Springs, South Africa	Easterns	1991–92	1995–96	16	20	0	
Landau Recreation Club	Witbank	Mpumalanga	1991–92	2006–07	3	6	0	
Goble Park	Bethlehem	Free State	1929–30	1936–37	2	0	0	No longer used for cricket.
Lanion Hall Cricket Club	Nelspruit	Mpumalanga	2006–07		1	0	0	No longer used for cricket.
Harmony Gold Mine Cricket Club 'A' Ground	Virginia	Free State	1986–87	1996–97	4	19	0	No longer used for cricket.
Virginia Gold Mining Company Ground	Virginia	Free State	1957–58		1	0	0	Hosted one game in 1957 between Orange Free State and Griqualand West.
Rovers Cricket Club	Welkom	Free State	1980–81	1984–85	2	0	0	
Welkom Mines Recreation Ground	Welkom	Free State	1954–55	1963–64	3	0	0	
**Springbok Park**	Bloemfontein	Free State	1989–90	2010–11	133	162	22	Hosted Test, ODI and Twenty20 International matches.
Ramblers Cricket Club Ground	Bloemfontein	Free State	1903–04	1985–86	146	16	0	
Schoeman Park 'A' Ground	Bloemfontein	Free State	1976–77		1	0	0	Hosted one match in 1976 between Orange Free State and a combined South African Universities team.
South African Railways Ground (Bloemfontein)	Bloemfontein	Free State	1937–38	1939–40	5	0	0	
Tokkie Park, Technikon	Bloemfontein	Free State	2004–05	2008–09	2	2	0	
University of Orange Free State Ground	Bloemfontein	Free State	1986–87	2007–08	18	9	0	
Lindique Oval	Alberton	Gauteng	2009–10	2009–10	1	1	0	
East Rand Proprietary Mine Ground	Boksburg	Gauteng	1913–14		1	0	0	Hosted one game in 1914 between a Transvaal XI and the MCC.
Braam Fisherville	Dobsonville	Gauteng	2007–08	2007–08	1	1	0	Named after Braam Fischer.
**Ellis Park**	Johannesburg	Gauteng	1946–47	1955–56	39	0	0	Hosted six Tests between 1948 and 1954. No longer used for cricket.
George Lea Sports Club	Johannesburg	Gauteng	1982–83	1983–84	2	0	0	Hosted two matches between Transvaal 'B' and Orange Free State.
Jeppe Boys Cricket Club Ground	Kensington	Gauteng	1931–32		1	0	0	
Lenasia Stadium	Johannesburg	Gauteng	1972–73	2006–07	43	2	0	
Natalspruit Indian Sports Ground	Alberton	Gauteng	1971–72	1972–73	3	0	0	
New Wanderers No. 1 Oval	Johannesburg	Gauteng	1968–69	1991–92	8	0	0	
New Wanderers No. 2 Oval	Johannesburg	Gauteng	2008–09	2008–09	0	8	0	
New Wanderers No. 3 Oval	Johannesburg	Gauteng	1991–92	1991–92	2	0	0	
**New Wanderers Stadium**	Johannesburg	Gauteng	1956–57	2010–11	344	265	45	Hosted Test, ODI and Twenty20 International matches.
Newclare Cricket Grounds	Johannesburg	Gauteng	1977–78		1	0	0	
Newlands (Johannesburg)	Johannesburg	Gauteng	1977–78	1983–84	12	0	0	Not to be confused with Newlands in Cape Town
Old Edwardians Cricket Club 'A' Ground	Johannesburg	Gauteng	1931–32	2009–10	4	2	0	
Old Wanderers No. 2 Ground	Johannesburg	Gauteng	1896–97	1931–32	12	0	0	
Old Wanderers No. 3 Ground	Johannesburg	Gauteng	1906–07	1931–32	8	0	0	
Old Wanderers No. 4 Ground	Johannesburg	Gauteng	1906–07	1906–07	2	0	0	
**Old Wanderers**	Johannesburg	Gauteng	1890–91	1945–46	113	0	0	Hosted 22 Tests before being replaced by the New Wanderers Stadium.
Orban Park	Johannesburg	Gauteng	2005–06	2010–11	5	5	0	
South African Railways Ground (Johannesburg)	Johannesburg	Gauteng	1923–24	1923–24	2	0	0	
Walter Milton Oval	Johannesburg	Gauteng	2005–06	2008–09	2	9	0	
NF Oppenheimer Ground	Randjesfontein	Gauteng	1994–95	2010–11	0	5	0	Named after De Beers chairman Nicky Oppenheimer.
Soweto Cricket Oval	Soweto	Gauteng	1995–96	2002–03	1	2	0	
Strathvaal Cricket Club 'A' Ground	Stilfontein	Gauteng	1963–64	1975–76	3	0	0	
Isak Steyl Stadium	Vanderbijlpark	Gauteng	2008–09	2008–09	0	5	0	
Dick Fourie Stadium	Vereeniging	Gauteng	1989–90	1990–91	2	2	0	
Roshnee Cricket Ground	Vereeniging	Gauteng	1981–82		1	0	0	
Vereeniging Brick and Tile Recreation Ground	Vereeniging	Gauteng	1965–66		1	0	0	
Athletic Club Ground	Kimberley	Griqualand West	1920–21	1926–27	14	0	0	
Christian Brothers College Ground	Kimberley	Griqualand West	1951–52	1951–52	2	0	0	
**De Beers Diamond Oval**	Kimberley	Griqualand West	1973–74	2010–11	153	124	9	Hosted 10 ODIs and a Twenty20 International.
De Beers Stadium	Kimberley	Griqualand West	1927–28	1972–73	89	2	0	Not to be confused with De Beers Diamond Oval (see above).
Roshnee Cricket Ground	Kimberley	Griqualand West	1981–82		1	0	0	
Eclectics Cricket Club Ground	Kimberley	Griqualand West	1889–90	1913–14	9	0	0	
Badulla Drive Ground	Durban	KwaZulu Natal	1984–85		1	0	0	
Curries Fountain	Durban	KwaZulu Natal	1973–74	1973–74	9	0	0	
Hammondfield	Durban	KwaZulu Natal	1984–85		1	0	0	
**Kingsmead**	Durban	KwaZulu Natal	1922–23	2010–11	354	229	54	Hosted Test, ODI and Twenty20 International matches.
**Lord's**	Durban	KwaZulu Natal	1897–98	1921–22	22	0	0	Hosted four Test matches between 1910 and 1921. Replaced by Kingsmead (see above) as Durban's Test venue.
Lord's No. 3 Ground	Durban	KwaZulu Natal	1910–11	1910–11	7	0	0	
Lord's No. 4 Ground	Durban	KwaZulu Natal	1910–11	1910–11	7	0	0	
Northwood Crusaders Club	Durban	KwaZulu Natal	1997–98		1	0	0	Hosted one match in 1997 between Natal 'B' and North West.
Siripat Road No. 1 Ground	Durban	KwaZulu Natal	1982–83	1989–90	6	0	0	
The Old Fort	Durban	KwaZulu Natal	1928–29	1928–29	2	0	0	
The Track (South Africa)	Durban	KwaZulu Natal	1928–29		1	0	0	Hosted one match in 1928 between Natal and Border.
Tills Crescent	Durban	KwaZulu Natal	1971–72	1990–91	17	0	0	
Chatsworth Stadium	Durban	KwaZulu Natal	1979–80	2010–11	20	13	0	
Albert Park	Durban	KwaZulu Natal	1894–95	1905–06	3	0	0	
Addison Park	Empangeni	KwaZulu Natal	1989–90	2010–11	1	5	0	
Lambert Park	Estcourt	KwaZulu Natal	1988–89		1	0	0	
Settler's Park	Ladysmith	KwaZulu Natal	1970–71	1986–87	6	0	0	
Paradise Oval	Newcastle	KwaZulu Natal	1977–78	1985–86	4	0	0	
**City Oval**	Pietermaritzburg	KZN Inland	1894–95	2010–11	71	33	0	Hosted two matches in the 2003 World Cup.
Jan Smuts Stadium	Pietermaritzburg	KZN Inland	1958–59	1995–96	44	14	0	Not to be confused with the Jan Smuts Ground in East London (see above).
Khan Road Oval	Pietermaritzburg	KZN Inland	1986–87	1988–89	5	0	0	
Tatham Road Cricket Ground	Pietermaritzburg	KZN Inland	1980–81	1981–82	2	0	0	
Lahee Park	Pinetown	KwaZulu Natal	1973–74	1979–80	10	0	0	
Watson Park	Tongaat	KwaZulu Natal	1983–84	1984–85	3	0	0	
Alexandra Memorial Ground	Umzinto	KwaZulu Natal	1973–74	1976–77	2	0	0	
**Moses Mabhida Stadium**	Durban	KwaZulu Natal	2010–11		2	0	0	Hosted one Twenty20 International in 2011 between South Africa and India.
Modjadjiskloof Oval	Modjadjiskloof	Limpopo	2006–07	2006–07	4	4	0	
Gert van Rensburg Stadium	Fochville	North West	1994–95	1998–99	5	21	0	
Absa Puk Oval	Potchefstroom	North West	1982–83	2008–09	7	14	0	
Mohadin Oval	Potchefstroom	North West	1978–79	1998–99	1	0	0	Hosted one match in 1979 between Transvaal and Western Province.
**Senwes Park**	Potchefstroom	North West	1994–95	2010–11	70	92	7	Hosted one Test match between South Africa and Bangladesh in 2002. Also hosted 16 ODIs.
South African Defence Force Ground	Potchefstroom	North West	1972–73		1	0	0	Hosted one match in 1972 between Transvaal and a combined South African Universities team.
Witrand Cricket Field	Potchefstroom	North West	1991–92	2009–10	13	4	0	
Olympia Park	Rustenburg	North West	2010–11	2010–11	1	1	0	
Hosking Park	Brakpan	Northerns	1945–46	1946–47	2	0	0	
**Centurion Park**	Centurion	Northerns	1986–87	2010–11	137	189	41	Hosted Test, ODI and Twenty20 International matches.
Lowveld Country Club	Nelspruit	Northerns	1988–89		0	1	0	Hosted one match between Northern Transvaal Country Districts and Transvaal in 1989.
Pietersburg 'A' Ground	Polokwane (Pietersburg)	Northerns	1982–83	1992–93	4	3	0	
Berea Park	Pretoria	Northerns	1906–07	1993–94	124	20	0	
Caledonian Stadium	Pretoria	Northerns	1951–52	1952–53	4	0	0	
Harlequins	Pretoria	Northerns	1995–96		1	0	0	Hosted one match in 1995 between Northern Transvaal 'B' and Eastern Province 'B'.
Laudium Oval	Pretoria	Northerns	2001–02	2001–02	0	2	0	
LC de Villiers Oval	Pretoria	Northerns	1997–98	2010–11	27	32	0	
Loftus Versfeld	Pretoria	Northerns	1956–57	1959–60	6	0	0	
Sinovich Park	Pretoria	Northerns	2006		1	0	0	Hosted one match in the 2006 Intercontinental Cup between Canada and The Netherlands.
TUT Oval	Pretoria	Northerns	1983–84	2005–06	2	15	0	
Officers Club Ground	Pretoria	Northerns	1905–06		1	0	0	Hosted one match in 1906 between a South African Army team and the MCC
The Point Recreation Ground	Mossel Bay	South Western Districts	1904–05		1	0	0	Hosted one match in 1904 between South-West Districts and Western Province.
Recreation Ground	Oudtshoorn	South Western Districts	1989–90	2010–11	21	23	0	
Newlands Rugby Ground	Cape Town	Border	1893–94	1908–09	8	0	0	
**Newlands**	Cape Town	Western Province	1893–94	1908–09	422	216	38	Hosted Test, ODI and Twenty20 International matches.
Northerns-Goodwood Cricket Club Oval	Goodwood	Western Province	1993–94	2010–11	6	6	0	
PP Smit Stadium	Bellville	Western Province	1997–98	2008–09	4	1	0	
RJE Burt Oval	Constantia	Western Province	1976–77	1991–92	28	0	0	
Avendale Cricket Club	Athlone	Western Province	1993–94		1	0	0	Hosted one match in 1993 between Western Province 'B' and Boland 'B'
Avonwood Park	Cape Town	Western Province	1977–78	1981–82	5	0	0	
Boon Wallace Oval	Cape Town	Western Province	1985–86	1991–92	6	0	0	
Durbanville Cricket Club Ground	Cape Town	Western Province	2009–10	2009–10	2	1	0	
Elfindale	Cape Town	Western Province	1979–80	1984–85	10	0	0	
Florida Park	Cape Town	Western Province	1986–87	1989–90	8	0	0	
Green Point Stadium	Cape Town	Western Province	1910–11	1988–89	20	13	0	Demolished in 2007.
Rosmead Sports Ground	Cape Town	Western Province	1971–72	1973–74	4	0	0	Demolished in 2007.
The Vineyard	Cape Town	Western Province	2006–07	2006–07	1	1	0	
Tigers Cricket Club Ground	Cape Town	Western Province	1994–95		1	0	0	
Turfhall Park	Cape Town	Western Province	1975–76	1978–79	4	0	0	
UCT Bowl	Cape Town	Western Province	2006–07	2008–09	5	6	0	
University Oval	Bellville	Western Province	1990–91	2006–07	3	1	0	
Westridge Sports Complex	Cape Town	Western Province	1977–78	1982–83	2	0	0	
William Herbert Sports Ground	Wynberg	Western Province	1971–72	1974–75	2	0	0	
Rocklands Sports Complex 'A' Ground	Mitchell's Plain	Western Province	1982–83	1983–84	2	0	0	

- First used and last used refer to the season in which the ground hosted its first and last game. If only one game was played at the ground, only the first used date is given.
- Team refers to the

== See also ==
- List of Test cricket grounds – Full international list
- List of stadiums in South Africa
