= Australian cricket team in South Africa in 1902–03 =

International cricket tour

Australia in South Africa in 1902–03
| | South Africa | Australia |
- Dates: 11 October 1902 – 11 November 1902
| Captains | HM Taberer (1st Test); JH Anderson (2nd Test); EA Halliwell (3rd Test) | J Darling |

Test series
- Result: Australia won the 3-match series 2–0
| Most runs | JH Sinclair (286) | C Hill (327) |
| Most wickets | CB Llewellyn (25) | JV Saunders (15) |

The Australia national cricket team toured several British colonies in the area that is present-day South Africa between 1902 and 1903, playing in three test matches against the South Africa national cricket team. The tour was a one-month stop-off for Australia after touring England. The Australian captain was Joe Darling, while South Africa had three different captains throughout the series: Henry Taberer, Biddy Anderson and Ernest Halliwell.

The first test at the Old Wanderers was also the first match ever between the two sides. Six players made their debuts for South Africa as they forced Australia to follow-on; however, the match ended in a draw. Four days later at the same venue, Australia won the second test by 159 runs off the back of a Warwick Armstrong century and a seven-wicket haul in the second innings from Jack Saunders. The final test was played at the Newlands Cricket Ground, where Australia cruised to a ten wicket victory. Australian player Clem Hill was the leading run scorer of the series with 327 runs while South African, Charlie Llewellyn was the leading wicket taker with 25 wickets.

== Test series summary ==
Australia won the Test series 2–0 with one match drawn.

Match length: 3 days (excluding Sundays). Balls per over: 6.

=== First Test ===
11–14 October 1902
Scorecard

| South Africa | v | Australia |
| 454 (95 overs); LJ Tancred 97; AJY Hopkins 3/59 (12 overs) | | 296 (51 overs); RA Duff 82; CB Llewellyn 6/92 (22 overs) |
| 101/4 (32 overs); CMH Hathorn 31; WW Armstrong 2/24 (7 overs) | | 372/7d (f/o) (78 overs); C Hill 142; CB Llewellyn 3/124 (26 overs) |

Match drawn
Old Wanderers, Johannesburg
Umpires: F Hearne and A Soames

- South Africa won the toss and elected to bat.
- 12 October was taken as a rest day
- LJ Tancred, CMH Hathorn, CJE Smith, HM Taberer, AW Nourse and G Thornton (all SA) made their Test debuts.

=== Second Test ===
18–21 October 1902
Scorecard

| Australia | v | South Africa |
| 175 (55.1 overs); WW Armstrong 49; CB Llewellyn 5/43 (18.1 overs) | | 240 (53 overs); JH Sinclair 101; VT Trumper 3/60 (12 overs) |
| 309 (81.4 overs); WW Armstrong 159*; CB Llewellyn 5/73 (31.4 overs) | | 85 (22 overs); LJ Tancred 29; JV Saunders 7/34 (11 overs) |

Australia won by 159 runs
Old Wanderers, Johannesburg
Umpires: F Hearne and FE Smith

- Australia won the toss and elected to bat.
- 19 October was taken as a rest day
- JH Anderson and JJ Kotze (both SA) made their Test debuts.

=== Third Test ===
8–11 November 1902
Scorecard

| Australia | v | South Africa |
| 252 (70.5 overs); C Hill 91*; CB Llewellyn 6/97 (30.5 overs) | | 85 (33.2 overs); CMH Hathorn 19; WP Howell 4/18 (17 overs) |
| 59/0 (9.5 overs); VT Trumper 38* | | 225 (f/o) (63.1 overs); JH Sinclair 104; WP Howell 5/81 (26 overs) |

Australia won by 10 wickets
Newlands, Cape Town
Umpires: WH Creese and F Hearne

- Australia won the toss and elected to bat.
- 9 November was taken as a rest day
- PS Twentyman-Jones (SA) made his Test debut.

== Tour matches ==
| No. | Date | Opponents | Result | Batting first | Batting second | Venue | Ref |
|---|---|---|---|---|---|---|---|
| 1 | 11–14 October 1902 | SOUTH AFRICA (1st Test) | Match drawn | South Africa; 454 (95 overs) & 101/4 (32 overs) | Australia; 296 (51 overs) & 372/7d (f/o) (78 overs) | Old Wanderers, Johannesburg | |
| | 15–17 October 1902 | XV of Transvaal | Match drawn | Transvaal; 462 (91.4 overs) & 201/8d (56 overs) | Australians; 392 (59.2 overs) & 158/3 (26 overs) | Old Wanderers, Johannesburg | |
| 2 | 18–21 October 1902 | SOUTH AFRICA (2nd Test) | Australians won by 159 runs | Australia; 175 (55.1 overs) & 309 (81.4 overs) | South Africa; 240 (53 overs) & 85 (22 overs) | Old Wanderers, Johannesburg | |
| | 25–27 October 1902 | XV of Natal | Match drawn | Australians; 268 (71.2 overs) & 203/6d (37 overs) | Natal; 206 (75 overs) & 69/6 (42 overs) | Lord's, Durban | |
| 3 | 5–6 November 1902 | Western Province | Australians won by 282 runs | Australians; 172 (42.1 overs) & 274 (58 overs) | Western Province; 84 (22.4 overs) & 80 (28.5 overs) | Newlands, Cape Town | |
| 4 | 8–11 November 1902 | SOUTH AFRICA (3rd Test) | Australia won by 10 wickets | Australia; 252 (70.5 overs) & 59/0 (9.5 overs) | South Africa; 85 (33.2 overs) & 225 (f/o) (63.1 overs) | Newlands, Cape Town | |

== Annual reviews ==
- Wisden Cricketers' Almanack 1904
