= Arthur Cook (cricketer) =

South African cricketer

Personal information
- Full name: Arthur Eyre Cook
- Born: 28 July 1889; King William's Town, Cape Colony, South Africa
- Died: 25 September 1970 (aged 81); Benoni, Transvaal, South Africa
- Batting: Left-handed
- Bowling: Left-arm medium
- Relatives: Trevor Cook (son); George Cook (brother)

Domestic team information
- Years: Team
- 1906/07–1909/10: Border
- 1912/13–1913/14: Transvaal

Career statistics
Competition	First-class
Matches	13
Runs scored	506
Batting average	24.09
100s/50s	1/3
Top score	101
Balls bowled	434
Wickets	10
Bowling average	27.80
5 wickets in innings	–
10 wickets in match	–
Best bowling	3/35
Catches/stumpings	6/–
- Source: Cricinfo, 26 July 2019

Arthur Eyre Cook (28 July 1889 – 25 September 1970) was a South African first-class cricketer.

Cook was born at King William's Town in July 1889. He made his debut in first-class cricket for Border against Transvaal at King William's Town in March 1907, with Cook featuring in the return fixture at East London. He next played for Border in the 1908–09 Currie Cup, making three appearances in the competition. He played against the touring Marylebone Cricket Club in January 1910, before playing two matches for H. D. G. Leveson Gower's touring XI against Rhodesia. He played one match for The Rest against Transvaal in December 1911, before making four appearances for Transvaal from March 1913 to April 1914. In thirteen first-class matches, Cook scored 506 runs at an average of 24.09 and a high score of 101. This score, which was his only first-class century, came for H. D. G. Leveson-Gower's XI against Rhodesia. With his left-arm medium pace bowling, he took 10 wickets at a bowling average of 27.80, with best figures of 3 for 35. He died at Benoni in September 1970. His son, Trevor, and brother, George, both played first-class cricket.
