= George Shepstone =

South African cricketer

Personal information
- Full name: George Harold Shepstone
- Born: 9 April 1876; Pietermaritzburg, Colony of Natal
- Died: 3 July 1940 (aged 64); Germiston, Transvaal, South Africa
- Batting: Right-handed
- Bowling: Right-arm fast-medium

International information
- National side: South Africa
- Test debut: 2 March 1896 v England
- Last Test: 14 February 1899 v England

Domestic team information
- Years: Team
- 1897–98 to 1904–05: Transvaal

Career statistics
Competition	Test	First-class
Matches	2	22
Runs scored	38	693
Batting average	9.50	21.00
100s/50s	0/0	1/1
Top score	21	104
Balls bowled	115	1,680
Wickets	0	42
Bowling average	–	16.23
5 wickets in innings	–	3
10 wickets in match	–	1
Best bowling	–	5/17
Catches/stumpings	2/–	11/–
- Source: Cricinfo, 13 November 2022

George Harold Shepstone (9 April 1876 – 3 July 1940) was a South African cricketer who played in two Test matches in 1896 and 1899. He played first-class cricket for Transvaal from 1897–98 to 1904–05.

Shepstone was born in Pietermaritzburg and educated in England at Repton School, where he played in the First XI in 1892 and 1893.

== Cricket career ==
Shepstone was an all-rounder – a right-handed middle-order batsman and right-arm fast-medium bowler – who made his first-class and Test debuts in the same match, for South Africa against England in 1895–96. Playing in only the second of the three-Test series, he scored 21 and 9 batting in the middle order, and took no wickets.

Shepstone was one of only two century-makers in the Currie Cup in 1897–98, with 104 for Transvaal against Griqualand West. Opening the Transvaal bowling with Jimmy Sinclair, he also took 14 wickets in the competition, including 5 for 77 and 4 for 34 against Natal.

When England next toured South Africa in 1898–99, Shepstone played in the First Test, but was unsuccessful and South Africa lost. He was not selected for the Test team again.

Shepstone played in the Transvaal teams that won the Currie Cup in 1902–03 and 1903–04. In the Currie Cup match against Border in April 1903, he took 5 for 22 and, bowling throughout the second innings in partnership with Johannes Kotze, 5 for 17. He toured England in 1904 with the South African team, when no Tests were played, but owing to illness he played in only six of the 22 first-class matches.

== Personal life ==
Shepstone married Ellen Hilda Chambers, a divorcee, in Johannesburg in August 1907. In July 1940, suffering from bowel cancer, he shot himself in the head, and died in hospital in Germiston, aged 64.
