= Graham Charlesworth =

English cricketer and coach

Personal information
- Full name: Graham Michael Charlesworth
- Born: 15 February 1965 (age 61); Ashow, Warwickshire, England
- Batting: Left-handed
- Role: All-rounder

Domestic team information
- Years: Team
- 1989/90–1990/91: Griqualand West
- 1989/90–1990/91: Impalas
- 1993: Cambridge University
- 1993: Combined Universities

Head coaching information
- Years: Team
- 2012–: Oxford University

Career statistics
Competition	First-class	List A
Matches	18	18
Runs scored	803	537
Batting average	29.74	44.75
100s/50s	0/6	1/2
Top score	83	100*
Balls bowled	1,917	390
Wickets	61	4
Bowling average	55.00	71.75
5 wickets in innings	0	0
10 wickets in match	0	0
Best bowling	3/33	2/28
Catches/stumpings	11/–	3/–
- Source: CricketArchive, 16 March 2016

Graham Michael Charlesworth (born 15 February 1965) is an English former first-class cricketer and the coach of Oxford University Cricket Club. Charlesworth has played first-class and List A cricket for Griqualand West, Cambridge University, Impalas, and Combined Universities.

Charlesworth studied for his undergraduate degree at Durham University, where he won a full palatinate for cricket.

== Career ==
Charlesworth made his List A debut in October 1989 in a Nissan Shield match for Griqualand West against Western Transvaal at the Fanie du Toit Sports Complex. Charlesworth bowled 9 overs for 32 runs, and scored 36* in the match. A month later, he made his first-class debut in a 1989/90 Castle Bowl match against Orange Free State B at Harmony Gold Mine Cricket Club A Ground. He took 1/91 in the first innings, and scored 19 and 43. At the same time, Charlesworth represented Impalas, a team that represented South African minor provinces, in the Benson & Hedges Series of 1989/90 and 1990/91. His highest first-class score was 81 for Griqualand West against Boland in a 1990/91 Castle Bowl match, and he made a single List A century in his career, in a 1990/91 Benson & Hedges Series match for Impalas against Eastern Province. In 1993, Charlesworth made first-class appearances for Cambridge University, and a single List A appearance for the Combined Universities in the 1993 Benson & Hedges Cup.

In 1993/94, Charlesworth captained Vredenburg-Saldanha; the team which included Ashley Giles. In the 1999/2000 season, Charlesworth was coach of the Griqualand West B team. From 2002 to 2009, Charlesworth played for Oxford cricket team, before moving to Abingdon Vale in 2010. Charlesworth joined Abingdon as a player, but also undertook some coaching responsibilities, and in 2012, he was appointed the team's captain. At the same time, Charlesworth worked as the coach of the Oxford University cricket team.
