= Howard Francis =

South African cricketer (1868–1936)

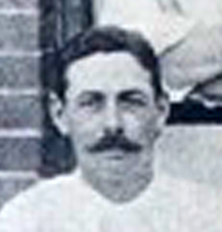
- Francis in 1899

Personal information
- Full name: Howard Henry Francis
- Born: 26 May 1868; Clifton, Bristol, England
- Died: 7 January 1936 (aged 67); Sea Point, Cape Town, Cape Province, South Africa
- Batting: Right-handed

International information
- National side: South Africa
- Test debut (cap 41): 14 February 1899 v England
- Last Test: 1 April 1899 v England

Domestic team information
- Years: Team
- 1890–1894: Gloucestershire
- 1895/96–1902/03: Western Province

Career statistics
Competition	Test	First-class
Matches	2	25
Runs scored	39	529
Batting average	9.75	12.90
100s/50s	0/0	0/1
Top score	29	55
Catches/stumpings	1/–	13/1
- Source: Cricinfo, 16 February 2020

Howard Henry Francis (26 May 1868 – 7 January 1936) was a South African cricketer who played in two Test matches in 1899.

Francis was born in Clifton, Bristol, England. A batsman, he played for Gloucestershire from 1890 to 1894 before moving to South Africa in 1895. There he played for Western Province from 1895–96 to 1902–03. His highest first-class score was 55 for Gloucestershire against Middlesex at Clifton in 1894, when he and Jack Board added 137 for the ninth wicket out of a team total of 225.

Francis was the top-scorer on either side when Lord Hawke's XI played the first match of their tour in 1898–99 against a Western Province XIII, scoring 45 in the first innings batting at number three. Three weeks later he also top-scored, with 33, in the first innings for Cape Colony against Lord Hawke's XI in the first first-class match of the tour. He played for South Africa in the two Test matches that followed, but was unsuccessful. However, he top-scored batting at number three in South Africa's second innings in the First Test, scoring 29 out of a team total of 99.

Francis was also a footballer, playing for Clifton until he moved to South Africa.

Francis worked as a shipping clerk in Cape Town. He married Maria Kate Roskelly there in April 1903.
