= Norman Reid (cricketer) =

South African cricketer (1890–1947)

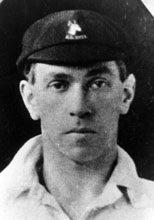

Personal information
- Born: 26 December 1890; Cape Town, Cape Colony
- Died: 5/6 June 1947 (aged 56); Cape Town, South Africa
- Batting: Right-handed
- Bowling: Right-arm
- Relatives: Allan Reid (brother)

International information
- National side: South Africa
- Only Test: 26 November 1921 v Australia

Domestic team information
- Years: Team
- 1920/21–1923/24: Western Province

Career statistics
Competition	Test	First-class
Matches	1	13
Runs scored	17	395
Batting average	8.50	21.94
100s/50s	0/0	0/1
Top score	11	81*
Balls bowled	126	941
Wickets	2	20
Bowling average	31.50	23.14
5 wickets in innings	0	0
10 wickets in match	0	0
Best bowling	2/63	4/52
Catches/stumpings	0/–	6/–
- Source: CricketArchive, 13 November 2022

Norman Reid DSO MC (26 December 1890 – 5/6 June 1947) was a South African cricketer who played one Test match for South Africa in 1921.

Born in Cape Town, Reid was educated at Diocesan College in Rondebosch and at Oriel College, Oxford, where he was awarded a rugby union Blue in 1912 and 1913. In the First World War he served in South-West Africa with the Imperial Light Horse before transferring to the Royal Field Artillery in France. He was wounded twice and received the Distinguished Service Order and the Military Cross. On his return to South Africa he became a solicitor.

Reid was a lower-order batsman, right-arm bowler and brilliant fieldsman who played first-class cricket for Western Province from 1920 to 1923. He took 4 for 52 and 1 for 21 and made 25 runs for once out when Western Province lost to the touring Australians at Newlands in November 1921. He was selected for the Third and final Test that began on the same ground four days later and made 17 runs and took two wickets. It was his only Test. His most successful first-class match came in Western Province's Currie Cup victory over Orange Free State later that season, when he scored 38 not out and 81 not out (the highest score in the match) and took 1 for 29 and 3 for 43.

Reid died in June 1947 in what his Wisden obituary described as "tragic circumstances". Later research by Brian Bassano and David Frith revealed that Reid was murdered by his wife who suffered from mental health problems and later took her own life.
