= Australian cricket team in South Africa in 1921–22 =

International cricket tour

The Australia national cricket team toured South Africa from October to November 1921 and played a three-match Test series against South Africa. Australia won the Test series 1–0. Australia were captained by Herbie Collins; South Africa by Herbie Taylor.

== Australian team ==
- Herbie Collins (captain)
- Tommy Andrews
- Warren Bardsley
- Hanson Carter
- Jack Gregory
- Hunter Hendry
- Charlie Macartney
- Ted McDonald
- Arthur Mailey
- Edgar Mayne
- Bert Oldfield
- Nip Pellew
- Jack Ryder
- Johnny Taylor

The Australians were on their way home from their five-Test tour of England. Their team was unchanged, except that Warwick Armstrong, the captain on the tour of England, did not go on to South Africa.

== Test series summary ==
Australia won the Test series 1–0 with two matches drawn.

Match length: 4 days (excluding Sundays). Balls per over: 6.

=== First Test ===
5–9 November 1921
Scorecard

Australia	v	South Africa
299 (84.4 overs); J Ryder 78*; JM Blanckenberg 5/78 (24.4 overs)		232 (80.1 overs); JW Zulch 80; JM Gregory 6/77 (25.1 overs)
324/7d (87 overs); CG Macartney 116; CP Carter 3/66 (21 overs)		184/7 (96 overs); CN Frank 38; EA McDonald 3/64 (34 overs)

Match drawn
Lord's, Durban
Umpires: FW Grey and AG Laver

- Australia won the toss and elected to bat.
- 6 November was taken as a rest day
- CN Frank, WVS Ling, WFE Marx and EP Nupen (all SA) made their Test debuts.

=== Second Test ===
12–16 November 1921
Scorecard

Australia	v	South Africa
450 (97.5 overs); HL Collins 203; CP Carter 6/91 (29.5 overs)		243 (78.3 overs); AW Nourse 64; JM Gregory 4/71 (19.3 overs)
7/0 (1.4 overs); HL Collins 5*		472/8d (f/o) (195 overs); CN Frank 152; JM Gregory 3/68 (28 overs)

Match drawn
Old Wanderers, Johannesburg
Umpires: SL Harris and AG Laver

- Australia won the toss and elected to bat.
- 13 November was taken as a rest day
- NV Lindsay (SA) made his Test debut.

=== Third Test ===
26–29 November 1921
Scorecard

South Africa	v	Australia
180 (88 overs); JW Zulch 50; AA Mailey 4/40 (14 overs)		396 (120 overs); J Ryder 142; JM Blanckenberg 4/82 (31 overs)
216 (80.3 overs); JW Zulch 40; CG Macartney 5/44 (24.3 overs)		1/0 (0.1 overs); AA Mailey 1*

Australia won by 10 wickets
Newlands, Cape Town
Umpires: HV Adams and AG Laver

- South Africa won the toss and elected to bat.
- 27 November was taken as a rest day
- N Reid (SA) made his Test debut.

== The tour ==
No.	Date	Opponents	Result	Batting first	Batting second	Venue	Ref
1	22–25 October 1921	Transvaal	Australians won by 9 wickets	Transvaal; 173 (74.5 overs) & 162 (52.5 overs)	Australians; 273 (61 overs) & 63/1 (15 overs)	Old Wanderers, Johannesburg	
2	29 October–1 November 1921	Natal	Australians won by 193 runs	Australians; 212 (69.3 overs) & 284/7d (77.5 overs)	Natal; 164 (67.3 overs) & 139 (52 overs)	Lord's, Durban	
3	5–9 November 1921	SOUTH AFRICA (1st Test)	Match drawn	Australia; 299 (84.4 overs) & 324/7d (87 overs)	South Africa; 232 (80.1 overs) & 184/7 (96 overs)	Lord's, Durban	
4	12–16 November 1921	SOUTH AFRICA (2nd Test)	Match drawn	Australia; 450 (97.5 overs) & 7/0 (1.4 overs)	South Africa; 243 (78.3 overs) & 472/8d (f/o) (195 overs)	Old Wanderers, Johannesburg	
5	19–22 November 1921	Western Province	Australians won by 8 wickets	Western Province; 153 (64.1 overs) & 191 (79.5 overs)	Australians; 231 (70.5 overs) & 114/2 (25.3 overs)	Newlands, Cape Town	
6	26–29 November 1921	SOUTH AFRICA (3rd Test)	Australia won by 10 wickets	South Africa; 180 (88 overs) & 216 (80.3 overs)	Australia; 396 (120 overs) & 1/0 (0.1 overs)	Newlands, Cape Town	

All 14 of the Australian team played at least one Test in the series; South Africa also used 14 players.
