= South African cricket team in England in 1904 =

International cricket tour

The South African national cricket team toured England during the 1904 season, playing 22 matches. No Test matches were played.

Most of the matches were against regular first-class sides, including an England XI (with five players who had already played Test cricket), a South of England side with five Test players, and two matches against Marylebone Cricket Club at Lord's.

The tourists won ten of their 22 matches, and lost two, against Worcestershire and Kent. They beat the England XI and the MCC once, and drew the other game against MCC and the one against South of England. They did not manage to beat any of the top four sides in the Championship, though; they drew with Lancashire and Yorkshire (twice), lost to Kent and tied with Middlesex.

== The South African team ==
- Frank Mitchell (captain)
- Ernest Halliwell
- Maitland Hathorn
- Stanley Horwood
- Johannes Kotze
- Charlie Llewellyn
- Bonnor Middleton
- Reggie Schwarz
- Bill Shalders
- George Shepstone
- Jimmy Sinclair
- Tip Snooke
- Louis Tancred
- Benjamin Wallach
- Gordon White

Horwood replaced his Western Province teammate Allan Reid, who had to withdraw just before the team left for England.

Frank Mitchell also played first-class cricket for Yorkshire during the season, which helped him score more than 1,000 first-class runs in the season. 839 of those were made for South Africa; Louis Tancred (1217) and Maitland Hathorn (1167) were the two players to make more than 1,000 runs for the South Africans. On the bowling side, pace bowler Johannes Kotze headed the attack, claiming 104 wickets in his 22 matches for the South Africans.
