= Charles Prince (disambiguation) =

Charles Prince (born 1950) is a former chief executive officer of Citigroup.

Charles Prince may also refer to:

- Charles H. Prince (1837–1912), U.S. Representative from Georgia
- Charles Prince (died 1973), ex Royal Air Force, after whom Charles Prince Airport is named
- Charles Prince (cricketer) (1874–1949), South African wicket-keeper
- Charles A. Prince (1869–1937), American bandleader, pianist and organist known for conducting the Columbia Orchestra
- Charles Prince (actor) (1872–1933), French silent film comedian
- Virginia Prince (1912–2009), American transgender activist who sometimes went by Charles Prince

== See also ==
- Prince Charles (disambiguation)
