= Eric Marx =

South African cricketer

Personal information
- Full name: Waldemar Frederick Eric Marx
- Born: 4 July 1895; Johannesburg, South African Republic
- Died: 2 June 1974 (aged 78); Durban, Natal, South Africa
- Batting: Left-handed
- Bowling: Right-arm medium-pace

International information
- National side: South Africa

Career statistics
Competition	Tests	First-class
Matches	3	9
Runs scored	125	656
Batting average	20.83	41.00
100s/50s	0/0	2/1
Top score	36	240
Balls bowled	228	780
Wickets	4	13
Bowling average	36.00	30.84
5 wickets in innings	0	0
10 wickets in match	0	0
Best bowling	3/85	3/85
Catches/stumpings	0/–	2/–
- Source: Cricinfo, 18 June 2019

Waldemar Frederick Eric Marx (4 July 1895 – 2 June 1974) was a South African cricketer who played in three Tests in 1921.

== Life and career ==
Marx was born in Johannesburg and educated at Malvern College in England. He created a world record that stood for 73 years when he scored 240 on his first-class debut, for Transvaal against Griqualand West at Johannesburg in December 1920. Opening the batting, he hit 39 fours and a six, and took only 225 minutes. By the end of the first day, 16 December, Transvaal had dismissed Griqualand West for 141 after declaring at 457 for 9: 598 runs for 19 wickets off 121.3 six-ball overs in a day's play. In the next three matches he opened both batting and bowling, hitting another century against Orange Free State (on an opening day that yielded 645 runs for 16 wickets) and taking 7 wickets at 25.42.

When the Australians toured in October and November 1921, Marx made 65 (the top score) against them for Transvaal, batting at number six, and was picked for the three Tests. Batting in the middle order and opening the bowling, he was only moderately successful, his best match being the Second Test, in which he made 36 and 34 and took three wickets.

Marx played one more match for Transvaal in December 1921. His first-class cricket career, which lasted just over 12 months, ended when he went to work on the mines of the East Rand and the mine manager refused to give him time off to play first-class cricket.
