= Maitland Hathorn =

South African cricketer

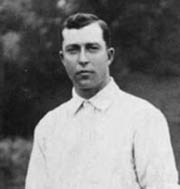

Personal information
- Full name: Christopher Maitland Howard Hathorn
- Born: 7 April 1878; Pietermaritzburg, Natal
- Died: 17 May 1920 (aged 42); Parktown West, Johannesburg, Transvaal, South Africa
- Batting: Right-handed

International information
- National side: South Africa

Domestic team information
- Years: Team
- 1897–98 to 1906–07: Transvaal

Career statistics
Competition	Test	First-class
Matches	12	87
Runs scored	325	3541
Batting average	17.10	26.62
100s/50s	1/0	9/12
Top score	102	239
Balls bowled	0	75
Wickets	–	1
Bowling average	–	52.00
5 wickets in innings	–	0
10 wickets in match	–	0
Best bowling	–	1/16
Catches/stumpings	5/–	27/–
- Source: CricketArchive

Christopher Maitland Howard Hathorn (7 April 1878 – 17 May 1920) was a South African cricketer who played in 12 Tests from 1902 to 1911.

== Cricket career ==
A solid right-handed batsman who usually batted in the middle order, Maitland Hathorn played first-class cricket for Transvaal from 1897–98 to 1906–07, but most of his first-class matches came on his three tours of England with South Africa in 1901, 1904 and 1907.

In the match against Cambridge University in 1901, the South Africans batted first and were 114 for 3 when Hathorn went to the wicket. At the end of the first day he was 203 not out, and the South Africans had scored 519 for 7. Playing "the most attractive cricket imaginable", he went on to make 239 in five hours. Largely thanks to this innings he topped the South African first-class aggregates and averages on the tour (on which no Tests were played), with 827 runs at an average of 35.95.

Hathorn played his first Test in the 1902–03 series against Australia, the first Tests between the two teams. In the drawn First Test he made 45 and 31, but was less effective in the Second and Third, which South Africa lost, although he top-scored in the first innings of the Third Test with 19 of South Africa's total of 85.

He was again successful when South Africa toured England in 1904. He scored 1167 runs at an average of 37.64, just behind Louis Tancred in the aggregates. He made three centuries, and in the important match against an England XI at Lord's he contributed 59 and 69 to the South Africans' victory. It was the last time South Africa toured England without playing Tests.

In the Test series against England in 1905–06, which South Africa won four to one, Hathorn played in all five matches but achieved little except in the Third Test, when he scored the first century of the series on either side, 102 off 170 balls, and South Africa won by 243 runs. It was South Africa's fourth Test century; the first three had been scored by Jimmy Sinclair. He was not successful in 1907, South Africa's first Test tour of England, although he played in all three Tests, scoring only 46 runs.

Notwithstanding his sporting success, Hathorn did not enjoy robust health. Despite having been seriously ill, he was selected for the tour of Australia in 1910–11, but his illness restricted him to three matches in five months. He retired from cricket straight after the tour.

== Personal life ==
Hathorn married Ruth Loesius in about 1912. She died of pneumonia in 1915. He died in 1920 aged just 42.
