= Harold Park, Bradford =

Urban park in West Yorkshire, England

Harold Park
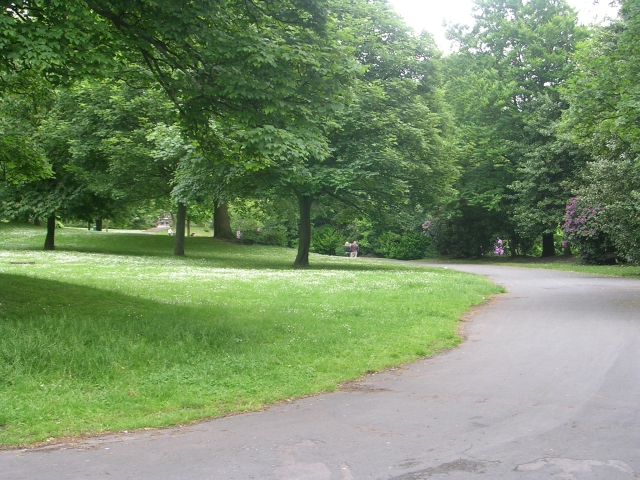
- Interactive map of Harold Park
- Type: Urban Park
- Location: Low Moor, City of Bradford, West Yorkshire
- Coordinates: 53.757°N 1.775°W
- Opened: 19 September 1885
- Etymology: Named in memory of Harold Gathorn Hardy
- Operator: City of Bradford, Parks and Landscape Services
- Open: All day, all year round
- Awards: Green Flag, Yorkshire in Bloom
- Website: BMDC, Friends of Harold Park

Harold Park is a small urban park in Low Moor, Bradford, West Yorkshire, England. The park is open all day all year round. To the immediate north of Harold Park is Horsfall Stadium home to Bradford Park Avenue A.F.C. and Albion Sports A.F.C. Park Dam is a short walking distance to the south.

The park has been given a Green Flag Award and the Platinum award from The Royal Horticultural Society Yorkshire in Bloom for open spaces.

== History ==
The park is named after Harold Gathorne Hardy who died on 11 June 1881. Harold was born in 1850 in Bradford, the fourth and youngest son of the Gathorne Hardy, 1st Earl of Cranbrook, himself a proud son of Bradford and eminent Victorian Statesman. Harold was for several years the Manager of the Low Moor Ironworks and also a partner. He resided at Low Moor House and took an active part in the well-being of his employees and local inhabitants. He was the first Chairman of the Enclosure Commissioners, enclosing the Commons of Wibsey and Low Moor to create a new public park. The new park was named in his honour after his sudden death at the age of 31 of consumption.

The Harold Club near to St. Mark’s Church, an excellent workingmen’s’ institution, was erected at a cost of over £2000 by his father, Lord Cranbrook and family, as a further memorial. Harold is interred at Benenden Church, near Hemsted Park, Kent, the seat of his father.

In 1899 a recreation ground was added to the park, while in the early 20th century Low Moor Gala was held raising money for local hospitals. In 1931 Horsfall playing fields were added to the park, in 2014 these became a Queen Elizabeth II Playing fields and also contains Horsfall Stadium.

== Landmarks ==
The park lodge and a small car park are in the east close to the entrance on Park Road, while the other entrance is in the west on Cemetery Road. Information boards are located around the park.

In the north of the park is a recently built sensory garden funded by Community Spaces and planted by children from local schools, and more recently maintained by Local volunteers and Bradford Park and recreation. Also in the north of the park there is a Bowling greens. To the west of the main lake is a fenced off children's play. Recent additions include an area with a cable rider, trim trail, climbing net and climbing wall.

=== Monuments ===
East of the lodge is a granite obelisk Boer War memorial. North of the lodge is a rose garden with a memorial sundial to the memory of cricketer Lieutenant Frank Milligan who died in 1900 at the age of 30, in an attempt to relieve the siege of Mafeking during the Second Boer War.

=== Lakes ===
In the south of the park is a near rectangular dam lake with an area of about 7 acres (2.8 hectares). The lake has a perimeter footpath and in the north an island wildlife refuge. The lake banks are walled and the lake depth varies from 3 feet (1 m) at the edge to a maximum of 20 feet (6.1 m) and the lake bottom is of stone. The lake is thought to have been a disused quarry, later used as a Victorian boating lake. The main lake is stocked with bream, carp, perch, roach, and tench and fishing permits can be purchased. For the bird watcher, birds found in and around the lakes include coot, great crested grebe, mute swan, tufted duck, moorhen, and mallard, and around the park mistle thrush, blackbird, redwing, blue tit, chaffinch and pigeon. For younger visitors there is pond dipping for invertebrates such as caddisfly, damselfly, leech, flatworm, water boatman, and water skater.

A further small dam lake of over 0.6 acres (0.24 hectares) known as Jug Dam is situated in the north of the park.

== Events ==
Events occurring in the park during the year include an Easter egg hunt, Halloween event, a Remembrance service, annual summer Gala and a Carol service.
