= English cricket team in South Africa in 1898–99 =

International cricket tour

An English cricket team, organised and led by Lord Hawke, toured South Africa from December 1898 to April 1899. The team played two matches against the South Africa national cricket team which were retrospectively awarded Test status. There is uncertainty about the status of South African cricket as a whole in the late nineteenth century and so only two of Hawke's matches against provincial teams, those involving Transvaal and Cape Colony, are rated first-class. Hawke's XI is designated England for the Test series which they won 2–0. The South African teams were captained by Murray Bisset. Hawke's team was generally average in quality and nothing like a full-strength England team, but it did include three of the best players of the time in Schofield Haigh, Johnny Tyldesley and Albert Trott, although Trott's previous Test cricket had been for Australia.

== Test series ==
=== First Test ===
14–16 February 1899
Scorecard

England	v	South Africa
145 (77.2 overs); JH Board 29; R Graham 2/22 (16 overs)		251 (84.1 overs); JH Sinclair 86; AE Trott 4/61 (30.1 overs)
237 (104 overs); PF Warner 132*; J Middleton 5/51 (26 overs)		99 (77.1 overs); HH Francis 29; AE Trott 5/49 (33.1 overs)

England won by 32 runs
Old Wanderers, Johannesburg
Umpires: A Soames (SA) and A White (ENG)

- England won the toss and elected to bat.
- F Mitchell, PF Warner, JT Tyldesley, CEM Wilson, WR Cuttell, FW Milligan, JH Board and S Haigh (all ENG), and VM Tancred, HH Francis, RR Dower, M Bisset, WRT Solomon and R Graham (all SA) made their Test debuts. AE Trott made his debut for ENG, having previously played for AUS.

=== Second Test ===
1–4 April 1899
Scorecard

England	v	South Africa
92 (48 overs); PF Warner 31; JH Sinclair 6/26 (12 overs)		177 (57.2 overs); JH Sinclair 106; AE Trott 4/69 (20.2 overs)
330 (133.2 overs); JT Tyldesley 112; JH Sinclair 3/63 (31.2 overs)		35 (22.4 overs); AW Powell 11; S Haigh 6/11 (11.4 overs)

England won by 210 runs
Newlands, Cape Town
Umpires: F Hearne (SA) and A White (ENG)

- England won the toss and elected to field.
- 2 April was taken as a rest day.
- AG Archer (ENG), and WA Shalders, AW Powell, F Kuys, CFH Prince (all SA) made their Test debuts.
