= Frederick Kuys =

South African cricketer (1870–1953)

Personal information
- Born: 21 March 1870; George, Cape Colony
- Died: 12 September 1953 (aged 83); Oudtshoorn, Cape Province, South Africa
- Batting: Right-handed
- Bowling: Right-arm

International information
- National side: South Africa
- Only Test: 1 April 1899 v England

Domestic team information
- Years: Team
- 1896/97–1898/99: Western Province

Career statistics
| Competition | Test | FC |
|---|---|---|
| Matches | 1 | 8 |
| Runs scored | 26 | 229 |
| Batting average | 13.00 | 16.35 |
| 100s/50s | 0/0 | 0/0 |
| Top score | 26 | 49 |
| Balls bowled | 60 | 502 |
| Wickets | 2 | 11 |
| Bowling average | 15.50 | 18.72 |
| 5 wickets in innings | 0 | 0 |
| 10 wickets in match | 0 | 0 |
| Best bowling | 2/31 | 4/66 |
| Catches/stumpings | 0/– | 2/– |
- Source: Cricinfo, 25 April 2019

Frederick Kuys (21 March 1870 – 12 September 1953) was a South African cricketer who played in one Test in 1899.

Kuys was a right-handed batsman and a right-arm bowler. He played for Western Province when they won the Currie Cup finals in 1896–97 and 1897–98.

Kuys was one of the better-performed local players in the provincial matches against the touring English team in 1898–99. He took five wickets and made the equal-top score of 33 for Cape Colony in mid-January, and top-scored with 49 when the two teams met again in late March. Selected for the Test that followed a few days later, he scored 26 in the first innings. It was the second-highest score in the match for South Africa, after Jimmy Sinclair's 106; the pair added 49 for the sixth wicket. With 121 first-class runs at an average of 20.16, he was the second-highest scorer after Sinclair (232 runs) among South African batsmen for the 1898–99 season. His seven wickets at an average of 18.14 put him on the top of the season's bowling averages among South African players.

Kuys worked as a civil servant. He married Hester Elizabeth van der Byl in Wynberg, Cape Town. They had three daughters and three sons. He died in September 1953, aged 83, and Hester died in April 1956, aged 77.
