= South African cricket team in England in 1901 =

International cricket tour

The South Africa national cricket team toured England between 16 May and 20 August 1901. They played 15 first-class cricket matches, and 10 other matches during their visit. Although a number of matches played by South Africa during the 1880s and 1890s were retrospectively granted Test cricket status, as the 1901 touring side did not play a representative England side, they did not compete in any Test matches. The South Africans were captained by Murray Bisset. The tour went ahead despite the ongoing Boer War, which suspended first-class cricket in South Africa between 1899 and 1902.

During the tour, Maitland Hathorn was the most successful batsman for the South Africans, scoring 827 runs at a batting average of 35.95. George Rowe was the tourists' leading wicket taker, with 70 wickets, but Jimmy Sinclair had the superior bowling average, claiming his 61 wickets at 19.85.

== Touring party ==
Batsmen
Name	Domestic team	Birth date	Batting style	Bowling style	Ref
Arthur Bisset	Western Province	15 January 1879 (aged 22)	Right-handed	Leg break	
Murray Bisset	Western Province	14 April 1876 (aged 25)	Right-handed	Slow left-arm orthodox	
Bertram Cooley	Natal	1874 (aged 26–27)	Right-handed	Unknown	
Maitland Hathorn	Transvaal	7 April 1878 (aged 23)	Right-handed	Unknown	
James Logan	–	24 June 1880 (aged 20)	Unknown	Unknown	
Allan Reid	Western Province	1 October 1877 (aged 23)	Right-handed	–	
William Shalders	Griqualand West	12 February 1880 (aged 21)	Right-handed	Right-arm medium	
Louis Tancred	Transvaal	7 October 1876 (aged 24)	Right-handed	Unknown	

Wicket-keepers
Name	Domestic team	Birth date	Batting style	Bowling style	Ref
Ernest Halliwell †	Transvaal	7 September 1864 (aged 36)	Right-handed	–	
Charles Prince †	Western Province	11 September 1874 (aged 26)	Right-handed	–	

All-rounders
Name	Domestic team	Birth date	Batting style	Bowling style	Ref
Charlie Llewellyn	Hampshire (Note: Llewellyn played for Natal until 1898, and then moved to England, and played for Hampshire for the rest of his career.)	26 September 1876 (aged 24)	Left-handed	Left-arm slow-medium	

Bowlers
Name	Domestic team	Birth date	Batting style	Bowling style	Ref
Robert Graham	Western Province	16 September 1877 (aged 23)	Right-handed	Right-arm medium	
Johannes Kotze	Transvaal	7 August 1879 (aged 21)	Right-handed	Right-arm fast	
George Rowe	Western Province	15 June 1874 (aged 26)	Right-handed	Slow left-arm orthodox	
Jimmy Sinclair	Transvaal	16 October 1876 (aged 24)	Right-handed	Leg break, Right-arm medium	

== Tour itinerary ==
Only matches accorded first-class status are numbered:

No.	Date	Opponents	Venue	Result	Ref
1	16–18 May	Hampshire	County Ground, Southampton	Lost by an innings and 51 runs	
2	20–22 May	London County	Crystal Palace Park, London	Won by 61 runs	
3	23–24 May	Kent	Foxgrove Road, Beckenham	Lost by 7 wickets	
4	27–28 May	Leicestershire	Aylestone Road, Leicester	Lost by 9 wickets	
5	30–31 May	Warwickshire	Edgbaston, Birmingham	Lost by an innings and 69 runs	
6	3–4 June	Marylebone Cricket Club	Lord's, London	Lost by 53 runs	
7	6–8 June	Derbyshire	County Ground, Derby	Won by 9 wickets	
8	10–12 June	Cambridge University	Fenner's, Cambridge	Won by an innings and 215 runs	
9	13–15 June	Somerset	County Ground, Taunton	Lost by 341 runs	
–	18–19 June	Ireland	Phoenix Cricket Club Ground, Dublin	Won by 5 wickets	
–	20–21 June	Dublin University	College Park, Dublin	Won by an innings and 42 runs	
–	24–25 June	Liverpool and District	Aigburth, Liverpool	Won by 5 wickets	
–	27–29 June	Durham	Feethams, Darlington	Won by 446 runs	
10	1–3 July	Lancashire	Old Trafford, Manchester	Lost by 8 wickets	
11	8–10 July	Surrey	The Oval, London	Lost by 59 runs	
12	11–13 July	Nottinghamshire	Trent Bridge, Nottinghamshire	Won by 94 runs	
13	15–17 July	Worcestershire	New Road, Worcester	Tied	
–	18–20 July	Northamptonshire	County Ground, Northampton	Won by 5 wickets	
–	22–24 July	Staffordshire	County Ground, Stoke-on-Trent	Drawn	
–	26–27 July	Wiltshire	County Ground, Swindon	Drawn	
14	1–3 August	Yorkshire	St George's Road, Harrogate	Lost by 151 runs	
–	5–7 August	East of Scotland	Raeburn Place, Edinburgh	Won by an innings and 42 runs	
–	8–9 August	West of Scotland	Hamilton Crescent, Glasgow	Won by 180 runs	
15	15–16 August	Gloucestershire	Clifton College Close Ground, Bristol	Won by an innings and 105 runs	
–	19–20 August	Glamorgan	Cardiff Arms Park, Cardiff	Won by 132 runs	
