= William Ling =

William Ling may refer to:

- William Ling (cricketer) (1891–1960), South African cricketer
- William Ling (referee) (1908–1984), English football referee
