= George Thornton =

George Thornton may refer to:

- George Thornton (politician) (1819–1901), Sydney mayor and New South Wales politician
- George Thornton (cricketer) (1867–1939), English and South African cricketer
- George Thornton (American football) (born 1968), NFL player
- George Thornton (rugby union) (born 1997), Scottish rugby union player
