= Robert Graham (cricketer) =

South African cricketer

Personal information
- Born: 16 September 1877; Grahamstown, Cape Colony
- Died: 21 April 1946 (aged 68); Upperton, Sussex, England
- Batting: Right-handed
- Bowling: Right-arm medium

International information
- National side: South Africa
- Test debut: 14 February 1899 v England
- Last Test: 1 April 1899 v England

Career statistics
Competition	Test	First-class
Matches	2	18
Runs scored	6	260
Batting average	1.50	10.83
100s/50s	0/0	0/1
Top score	4	63*
Balls bowled	240	2,370
Wickets	3	61
Bowling average	42.33	23.04
5 wickets in innings	0	5
10 wickets in match	0	1
Best bowling	2/22	8/90
Catches/stumpings	2/–	22/–
- Source: Cricinfo, 13 November 2022

Robert Graham (16 September 1877 – 21 April 1946) was a South African international cricketer who played two Test matches in the 1898–99 season.

A lower-order batsman, medium-pace bowler and a safe pair of hands in the field, Robert Graham played first-class cricket from 1898 to 1901. He made his debut for Western Province against Transvaal in the Currie Cup final of 1897–98 but did nothing of note in the victory that gave his side their fourth domestic title. However, he took 5 for 54 in his next match playing for Cape Colony against Lord Hawke's touring side of 1898–99 and was subsequently selected for the First Test. He took two wickets for 60 runs in the match and held two catches as England won by 32 runs. He then took 6 wickets for 97 runs, again for a Cape Colony XI against the tourists, which secured his place for the Second Test, in which he took one wicket for 67 and scored only two runs, a victim of Albert Trott in both innings.

After two seasons out of the first-class game Graham was invited to tour England with South Africa in 1901. On the trip he recorded his highest first-class score, 63 not out against Leicestershire, and took five wickets in an innings three times. These came in both innings of the match against Derbyshire – 6 for 84 and 5 for 47, thereby also giving him his only haul of ten wickets in a match – and the match against Worcestershire, 8 for 90. He played no further first-class cricket after the tour.

No obituary appeared in Wisden for Graham after his death in 1946. He was the brother of J.M. Graham (Transvaal), the nephew of D.K. Graham (Western Province) and the uncle of T.L. Graham (Western Province).
