= Stanley Horwood =

South African cricketer (1877–1959)

Personal information
- Full name: Stanley Ebden Horwood
- Born: 22 July 1877; Port Elizabeth, Cape Colony
- Died: 15 August 1959 (aged 82); Plumstead, Cape Town, Cape Province, South Africa
- Batting: Right-handed
- Relatives: Owen Horwood (son)

Domestic team information
- Years: Team
- 1903/04 to 1909/10: Western Province

Career statistics
Competition	First-class
Matches	22
Runs scored	484
Batting average	14.23
100s/50s	0/1
Top score	74
Catches/stumpings	8/–
- Source: Cricinfo, 30 June 2018

Stanley Ebden Horwood (22 July 1877 – 15 August 1959) was a Cape Colony cricketer who played first class cricket from 1899 to 1909.

Born in Port Elizabeth, Horwood was a middle-order batsman for Western Province. Despite a mediocre Currie Cup season in 1903–04, when he scored 65 runs at an average of 13.00, he was selected to tour England in 1904 with the South African team when his Western Province teammate Allan Reid had to withdraw at the last moment. He was not successful there either, scoring 103 runs at 10.30 in nine first-class matches. His best first-class match was for Western Province against the touring MCC in 1905–06, when he scored 23 and 74.

Horwood worked as a civil servant, then as a farmer. He married, first, Beatrice Newman in February 1908. He married his second wife, Anna Faure, in 1914. They had a daughter and two sons. Their son Owen became a professor of economics and a politician.

Horwood died in August 1959 at home in Plumstead, Cape Town, after a short illness, aged 82.
