= Charles Prince (cricketer) =

South African cricketer

Personal information
- Full name: Charles Frederick Henry Prince
- Born: 11 September 1874; Boshof, Orange Free State
- Died: 2 February 1949 (aged 74); Wynberg, Cape Town, South Africa
- Batting: Right-handed
- Role: Batsman-wicketkeeper

International information
- National side: South Africa

Career statistics
Competition	Tests	First-class
Matches	1	24
Runs scored	6	730
Batting average	3.00	17.80
100s/50s	0/0	0/4
Top score	5	61
Balls bowled	–	20
Wickets	–	0
Bowling average	–	–
5 wickets in innings	–	–
10 wickets in match	–	–
Best bowling	–	–
Catches/stumpings	0/–	14/13
- Source: CricketArchive, 3 July 2022

Charles Frederick Henry Prince (11 September 1874 – 2 February 1949) was a South African cricketer who played in one Test in 1899.

== Career ==
Prince was born in Boshof in Orange Free State, and attended Diocesan College in Rondebosch. A right-handed batsman and wicket-keeper, he played his first first-class match for Western Province in April 1895, when he opened the batting and kept wicket in the final of the Currie Cup.

In later years he also played for Border and Eastern Province. His most successful match with the bat was in Border's four-wicket victory over Transvaal in 1897–98, when he opened the batting and made 60 and 61, the two highest scores on either side in the match.

Prince's one Test match was the second match of the 1898–99 series against the English cricket team led by Lord Hawke. South Africa, having led by 85 on the first innings, were dismissed for just 35 in the second innings and lost the match by 210 runs. Prince, playing purely as a lower-order batsman, scored 5 and 1.

In 1901, Prince was a member of the South African side that visited England at the height of the Boer War. No Tests were played on that tour, but several matches were arranged against first-class counties. In England, a few days before the tour began, Prince played a first-class match for W. G. Grace's London County team against Cambridge University. He played his last first-class matches in the 1904–05 season for Western Province.
