= Bertram Cooley =

South African cricketer

Personal information
- Full name: Bertram Clifford Cooley
- Born: 1874; Durban, Natal Colony
- Died: 17 August 1935 (aged 60 or 61); Durban, South Africa

Domestic team information
- Years: Team
- 1893-94 to 1906-07: Natal

Career statistics
| Competition | First-class |
|---|---|
| Matches | 19 |
| Runs scored | 564 |
| Batting average | 20.14 |
| 100s/50s | 2/2 |
| Top score | 126 not out |
| Balls bowled |
| Wickets | 15 |
| Bowling average | 24.06 |
| 5 wickets in innings | 0 |
| 10 wickets in match | 0 |
| Best bowling | 4/34 |
| Catches/stumpings | 11/– |
- Source: Cricinfo, 25 February 2019

Bertram Clifford Cooley (1874 – 17 August 1935) was a South African cricketer who played first-class cricket for Natal from 1894 to 1907.

Cooley was a hard-hitting but inconsistent batsman and a useful bowler. He toured England with the South African team in 1901, scoring 126 not out batting at number nine against Cambridge University, but achieving little in the other matches. Batting at number ten in his final first-class innings, in the 1906-07 Currie Cup against Western Province, he went to the wicket with Natal's score at 100 for 8, then made 113, adding 217 for the ninth wicket with Dave Nourse; Natal won by 165 runs.
