= Impalas (cricket team) =

The Impalas cricket team represented minor provinces in South Africa's domestic Benson and Hedges Night Series Trophy List A cricket competition for ten seasons between 1984-85 and 1993-94.

The Impalas initially represented the Border, Boland, Orange Free State and Griqualand West province teams. These teams played in the Castle Bowl South Africa's secondary first-class competition.

Over the ten seasons the team usually finished in lowly positions in the competition table. However, in the 1987–88, 1988–89 and 1991–92 seasons, the Impalas reached the tournament semi-finals.

Border, Boland and Orange Free State all eventually provided their own teams for the Benson & Hedges Night Series competition and there was no need for the Impalas for the 1994–95 season.

In 2011–12 a new team was added to the MiWay T20 Challenge competition called Impi, to give opportunities to players who miss out on franchise selection. It competed only in the 2011-12 List A competition, going without a victory in 12 matches.

== Notable Impalas players ==
- Faoud Bacchus
- Kim Barnett
- Daryll Cullinan
- Allan Donald
- Claude Henderson
- Omar Henry
- Alvin Kallicharran
- John Morris
- John Stephenson
- Pat Symcox
- Emmerson Trotman
- Corrie van Zyl
- Paul Collingwood (Impi)
- Ryan Ten Doeschate (Impi)
- Luke Wright (Impi)
- Ben Edmondson (Impi)
- Beuran Hendricks (Impi)
- Khaya Zondo (Impi)

== Honours ==
- Benson & Hedges Night Series (0) – Semi-finals 1987–88, 1988–89 and 1991–92
- MiWay T20 Challenge (0) – Last i.e. seventh in 2011–12

== Venues ==
At first Impalas played all their matches away. Their home venues have included:

- St George's Park, Port Elizabeth (1985)
- Harmony Ground, Virginia (1986–87)
- Danie Craven Stadium, Stellenbosch (1987–88, 1989–90)
- Victoria Ground, King William's Town (1988–89)
- PAM Brink Stadium, Springs (1992–93, 1993–94)

== Sources ==
- Benson and Hedges Cricket Year – various editions
- Wisden Cricketers' Almanack – various editions
