= Allan Reid (cricketer) =

South African cricketer (1877–1948)

Personal information
- Born: 1 October 1877; Observatory, Cape Town, Cape Colony
- Died: 31 October 1948 (aged 71); Rosebank, Cape Town, Cape Province, South Africa
- Batting: Right-handed
- Relatives: Norman Reid (brother)

Domestic team information
- Years: Team
- 1896/97–1908/09: Western Province

Career statistics
Competition	First-class
Matches	32
Runs scored	894
Batting average	17.88
100s/50s	1/2
Top score	101*
Catches/stumpings	13/–
- Source: Cricinfo, 2 April 2024

Allan Reid (1 October 1877 – 31 October 1948) was a South African cricketer who played first-class cricket for Western Province from 1897 to 1909.

Reid was born in Cape Town and educated there at Diocesan College. A right-handed batsman, he played in five Currie Cup finals for Western Province, all of them against Transvaal. His only first-class century was 101 not out against Griqualand West in 1906–07, when Western Province scored 509 off 91.4 overs and went on to win by an innings and 359 runs.

Reid toured England with the South African team in 1901, when no Test matches were played, scoring 412 runs in first-class matches at an average of 22.88. He was also selected to tour England in 1904, but was unavailable and was replaced by his Western Province teammate Stanley Horwood.

Reid's younger brother Norman played in one Test for South Africa in 1921.
