= William Creese =

South African cricket umpire (1870–1918)

Personal information
- Full name: William Henry Creese
- Born: 15 January 1870; Usk, Monmouthshire, Wales
- Died: 23 October 1918 (aged 48); Belgium

Umpiring information
- Tests umpired: 1 (1902)
- Source: Cricinfo, 5 July 2013

William Creese (15 January 1870 – 23 October 1918) was a South African cricket umpire. He stood in one Test match, South Africa vs. Australia, in 1902. He was killed in action during World War I. His son was the cricketer Len Creese.

== See also ==
- List of Test cricket umpires
- Australian cricket team in South Africa in 1902–03
