= Turfhall Park =

Cricket and softball venue in South Africa

Ground information
- Location: Cape Town, South Africa
- Coordinates: 33.9871°S 18.5132°E
- Establishment: c. 1967

Team information
Western Province	(1975/76–1978/79)
- As of 28 June 2022; Source: Ground profile

Turfhall Park was a cricket ground in Cape Town, South Africa.

== History ==
The Western Province cricket team first played first-class cricket at the ground against Natal in the 1975–76 Stellenbosch Farmers Winery Trophy. The ground played host to Western Province in a further two first-class matches in 1976, before hosting them in 1978 in the final first-class match to be played at the ground. Cricket is no longer played at Turfhall Park, with a series of softball pitches replacing the cricket ground.

== Records ==
=== First-class ===
- Highest team total: 303 all out by Western Province v Transvaal, 1975–76
- Lowest team total: 67 all out by Western Province v Transvaal, as above
- Highest individual innings: 77 by Brian O'Connell for Western Province v Transvaal, as above
- Best bowling in an innings: 7–35 by Rushdi Magiet for Western Province v Transvaal, 1978–79
- Best bowling in a match: 9–46 by Winston Carelse for Western Province v Transvaal, 1975–76

== See also ==
- List of cricket grounds in South Africa
