= William Ling (cricketer) =

South African cricketer

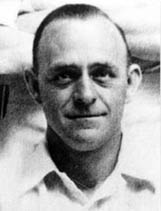

Personal information
- Full name: William Victor Stone Ling
- Born: 3 October 1891; Kimberley, Cape Colony
- Died: 26 September 1960 (aged 68); Brakpan, Transvaal, South Africa
- Batting: Right-handed
- Bowling: Legbreak googly

International information
- National side: South Africa
- Test debut: 5 November 1921 v Australia
- Last Test: 18 January 1923 v England

Domestic team information
- Years: Team
- 1910/11–1926–27: Griqualand West
- 1928/29: Eastern Province
- 1929/30: Griqualand West

Career statistics
Competition	Test	First-class
Matches	6	48
Runs scored	168	2,618
Batting average	16.80	31.16
100s/50s	0/0	3/18
Top score	38	187
Balls bowled	18	3,062
Wickets	0	72
Bowling average	–	31.52
5 wickets in innings	–	3
10 wickets in match	–	0
Best bowling	–	7/60
Catches/stumpings	1/–	20/–
- Source: Cricinfo, 31 January 2017

William Victor Stone Ling (3 October 1891 – 26 September 1960) was a South African cricketer who played in six Test matches from 1921 to 1923.

== Cricket career ==
A middle-order batsman and leg-spin bowler, Ling played first-class cricket for Griqualand West from 1911 to 1930, except for a season with Eastern Province in 1928–29. He was the second-highest scorer in the Currie Cup in 1920–21, with 434 runs at an average of 48.22, and was selected for all three Tests against the touring Australians late in 1921. He scored 33 and 28 in the First Test and finished the series with 115 runs at an average of 19.15.

Ling was the third-highest scorer in the Currie Cup in 1921–22, with 407 runs at an average of 58.14, and was selected for the first three Tests against England in 1922–23. He was less successful this time, and after missing most of the Third Test when he was summoned home to Kimberley to be with his seriously ill mother, he played no further Tests.

Although Ling was a wicket-taking leg-break and googly bowler in domestic cricket, he bowled only three overs in his six Tests. His best bowling performances in first-class cricket were 7 for 60 from 94 balls in Griqualand West's victory over Western Province in January 1926, and 6 for 77 off 90 balls in an innings loss to Orange Free State in March 1911. The highest of his three centuries in first-class cricket was 187 in a drawn match against Orange Free State in December 1923.

== Personal life ==
Ling married Ethel Dearden in Kimberley in November 1920. He died suddenly of a coronary thrombosis at his home in Brakpan, Transvaal, in September 1960, aged 68.
