= Albert Powell (South African sportsman) =

South African sportsman (1873–1948)

Personal information
- Full name: Albert William Powell
- Born: 18 July 1873; Kimberley, Cape Colony
- Died: 11 September 1948 (aged 75); Cape Town, Cape Province, South Africa
- Batting: Right-handed
- Bowling: Right-arm
- Relatives: Jackie Powell (brother)

International information
- National side: South Africa
- Only Test: 1 April 1899 v England

Career statistics
Competition	Test	First-class
Matches	1	16
Runs scored	16	296
Batting average	8.00	9.86
100s/50s	0/0	0/0
Top score	11	31
Balls bowled	20	709
Wickets	1	12
Bowling average	10.00	34.33
5 wickets in innings	0	0
10 wickets in match	0	0
Best bowling	1/10	4/62
Catches/stumpings	2/–	16/–
- Source: Cricinfo, 13 November 2022

Albert "Bertie" William Powell (18 July 1873 – 11 September 1948) was a South African sportsman who played both international cricket and rugby union for South Africa.

Powell was born in Kimberley, Cape Colony, in 1873. An all-rounder with safe hands in the field, he played sporadically for Griqualand West from 1892/93 to 1904/05.

When Lord Hawke brought the English team to South Africa in 1898/99, Powell was the outstanding player on either side in the match with a Griqualand West XV in March, taking 6 for 43 and scoring 72 before rain ended the match. He was selected for the second Test, played at Cape Town three weeks later. England won the match comprehensively by 210 runs, despite a first innings deficit of 85, and Powell's score of 11 was South Africa's highest in their second innings total of 35.

In 1896, Powell played at centre for the South Africa national rugby union team in the third Test of the British Isles tour of South Africa. This was his only international rugby match.

Powell's brother Jackie captained South Africa at rugby and also played first-class cricket for Griqualand West.
