= Cambridge Recreation Ground =

Cricket ground in East London, South Africa

- Location: Border, Eastern Cape, East London, South Africa
- Establishment: 1947
- Tenants: Border
- Last used: 1970
- As of 20 April 2023; Source: ESPNcricinfo

Cambridge Recreation Ground is a cricket ground in Border, a region of Eastern Cape province in East London, South Africa. It was used as the home ground for Border cricket team. The ground hosted three first-class matches in the 1947–48 Currie Cup. The first recorded match on the ground was on 16 December 1947, between Border and KwaZulu-Natal.
