= Alfred Archer =

English cricketer

Personal information
- Full name: Alfred German Archer
- Born: 6 December 1871; Richmond, Surrey, England
- Died: 25 July 1935 (aged 63); Seaford, Sussex, England
- Batting: Right-handed

International information
- National side: England
- Only Test (cap 120): 1 April 1899 v South Africa

Career statistics
Competition	Test	First-class
Matches	1	12
Runs scored	31	231
Batting average	31.00	11.00
100s/50s	0/0	0/0
Top score	24*	43
Catches/stumpings	0/0	10/2
- Source: CricketArchive, 30 December 2021

Alfred German Archer (6 December 1871 in Richmond, Surrey, England – 15 July 1935 in Seaford, Sussex, England) was a cricketer who played for Worcestershire in 1900 and 1901. Archer also played one Test match for Lord Hawke's XI England on their 1898–99 tour to South Africa: this was his first appearance in first-class cricket. He also played for Incogniti (1897–1900), and I Zingari (1903).

Although Archer was a wicket-keeper, he did not keep wicket or bowl in the Test match in which he played, and he batted at number 10. Overall, Archer had an undistinguished career: he did not even get into the first XI at his school at Haileybury. Archer also turned out for the Marylebone Cricket Club and for minor counties Worcestershire, and Shropshire between 1894 and 1903 while playing at club level for Ludlow.
