= Modjadjiskloof Oval =

Cricket ground

Coordinates: 23.69672°S 30.13639°E

The Modjadjiskloof Oval is a cricket ground in Modjadjiskloof, a small town situated at the foot of the escarpment in the Limpopo province of South Africa. Prior to 2004, this town was named Duiwelskloof.

This cricket ground was the home ground of the Limpopo cricket team for provincial cricket matches over the 2006-2007 season. Since then, it has hosted games between various teams, for example between the Polokwane Eagles and the Nkowankowa Cricket Club.

This cricket oval is accompanied by indoor and outdoor practice facilities, along with squash and tennis courts. Alumni of the cricket academy at this site include Dale Steyn and Ethy Mbhalati. Nearby attractions include Modjadji Nature Reserve and the Sunland Baobab.

== See also ==
- List of cricket grounds in South Africa
