= Frederick Klinck =

South African cricketer

Personal information
- Full name: Frederick Gordon Klinck
- Born: 3 June 1865; Port Elizabeth, Cape Colony
- Died: 11 August 1893 (aged 28); Doornfontein, Johannesburg, South African Republic
- Batting: Left-handed
- Bowling: Right-arm

Domestic team information
- Years: Team
- 1890–91 to 1892–93: Transvaal

Career statistics
| Competition | First-class |
|---|---|
| Matches | 3 |
| Runs scored | 41 |
| Batting average | 8.20 |
| 100s/50s | 0/0 |
| Top score | 33 |
| Balls bowled | 105 |
| Wickets | 2 |
| Bowling average | 27.50 |
| 5 wickets in innings | 0 |
| 10 wickets in match | 0 |
| Best bowling | 1/19 |
| Catches/stumpings | 2/– |
- Source: Cricinfo, 23 April 2020

Frederick Gordon Klinck (3 June 1865 – 11 August 1893) was a South African cricketer who played for Transvaal in the 1890s.

Born in Port Elizabeth, Klinck was educated at The King's School, Canterbury, and Diocesan College, Cape Town. He represented Kimberley in inter-provincial cricket in the 1880s in the period before such matches had first-class status.

In the match between a Cape Colony XV and the touring English team in January 1889, Klinck displayed "his well-known hitting powers" and scored 81, easily the highest score on either side, and the Cape Colony team won by 10 wickets. He represented Transvaal in the first seasons of the Currie Cup, but died only months after his last match, aged 28.
