= Charlie Frank =

South African cricketer (1891–1961)

Personal information
- Full name: Charles Newton Frank
- Born: 27 January 1891; Jagersfontein, Orange Free State
- Died: 25 December 1961 (aged 70); Bryanston, Johannesburg, South Africa
- Batting: Right-handed

International information
- National side: South Africa

Domestic team information
- Years: Team
- 1919–20 to 1925–26: Transvaal

Career statistics
| Competition | Tests | First-class |
|---|---|---|
| Matches | 3 | 17 |
| Runs scored | 236 | 683 |
| Batting average | 39.33 | 24.39 |
| 100s/50s | 1/0 | 2/1 |
| Top score | 152 | 152 |
| Balls bowled | 0 | 0 |
| Wickets | – | – |
| Bowling average | – | – |
| 5 wickets in innings | – | – |
| 10 wickets in match | – | – |
| Best bowling | – | – |
| Catches/stumpings | 0/0 | 3/0 |
- Source: Cricinfo

Charles Newton Frank (27 January 1891 – 25 December 1961) was a South African Test cricketer of the 1920s.

Born in Jagersfontein, Orange Free State, on 27 January 1891, Frank served in the First World War, where he was badly gassed, before returning to South Africa. A short and slightly-built man, known as "Charlie", he made his first-class cricket debut for Transvaal against the Australian Imperial Forces cricket team at Johannesburg in October 1919. He scored 108 and came into contention for national selection.

During Australia's tour of South Africa in 1921–22, Frank was selected for all three Test matches. He played a starring role in the Second Test at Johannesburg. South Africa were forced to follow on in their second innings 207 runs behind, and Frank batted for over eight and a half hours, scoring 152 to prevent an Australian victory. His time at the crease, against a strong Australian attack including Jack Gregory, Ted McDonald and Arthur Mailey, included partnerships of 105 with Herbie Taylor and 206 with Dave Nourse. Frank's century is one of the slowest in Test cricket. The Australian wicket-keeper Bert Oldfield later wrote: "He gave one the impression that he did not have the strength to hit the ball to the boundary."

Frank died in Bryanston, Johannesburg, on 25 December 1961, aged 70. No obituary appeared in Wisden.

Frank holds the record for the lowest career aggregate of runs scored in a complete Test match career (236) that includes a score of 150.

== Sources ==
- World Cricketers - A Biographical Dictionary by Christopher Martin-Jenkins, published by Oxford University Press (1996)
- The Wisden Book of Test Cricket, Volume 1 (1877-1977) compiled and edited by Bill Frindall, published by Headline Book Publishing (1995)
- Who's Who of Cricketers by Philip Bailey, Philip Thorn & Peter Wynne-Thomas, published by Hamlyn (1993)
