= Len Creese =

South African-born English cricketer

Personal information
- Full name: William Charles Leonard Creese
- Born: 27 December 1907; Parktown North, Transvaal, South Africa
- Died: 9 March 1974 (aged 66); Buckland, Kent, England
- Batting: Left-handed
- Bowling: Left-arm medium
- Relatives: Bill Creese (father)

Domestic team information
- Years: Team
- 1928–1939: Hampshire
- 1949–1951: Dorset

Career statistics
Competition	First-class
Matches	281
Runs scored	9,938
Batting average	24.06
100s/50s	6/50
Top score	241
Balls bowled	25,359
Wickets	410
Bowling average	27.42
5 wickets in innings	15
10 wickets in match	1
Best bowling	8/37
Catches/stumpings	191/–
- Source: Cricinfo, 21 February 2010

William Charles Leonard Creese (27 December 1907 – 9 March 1974) was a South African-born English cricketer who played first-class cricket in England for Hampshire between 1928 and 1939. Creese was born in South Africa in December 1907. He moved to England following the completion of his education to pursue a career as a professional cricketer, joining the staff at Hampshire in 1926. By 1933, he had established himself in the Hampshire side as an all-rounder. Creese would make 278 first-class appearances for Hampshire, scoring nearly 10,000 runs and taking over 400 wickets. He would also play first-class cricket for the Players, and following the Second World War, for the Combined Services. He was the cricket coach at Sherborne School between 1947 and 1954, during which time he also played minor counties cricket for Dorset. He later spent two periods as head groundsman at the Central Recreation Ground in Hastings, and was head groundsman at the County Ground in Hove.

== Early life ==
Creese was born in the Parktown North suburb of Johannesburg on 27 December 1907. His father, Bill Creese, was a cricketer and Test match umpire who was involved in the administration of cricket in Transvaal. His family were originally of Welsh extraction, hailing from Monmouthshire. Creese was educated at Rondebosch Boys' High School. After completing his education, he was determined to make it as a cricketer in English county cricket and travelled there from Cape Town at his own expense.

== Cricket ==
=== Early career ===
Creese joined the staff at Hampshire at the beginning of the 1926 season. Having spent two years qualifying to play for Hampshire in the County Championship through residency, he later made his debut in first-class cricket for Hampshire against Somerset at Portsmouth in the 1928 County Championship, with Creese featuring in two further matches in the season. What followed would be four seasons characterised by inconsistent performances, which hindered his establishment in the Hampshire team. He featured more extensively for Hampshire in the 1929 season, making 18 appearances in the County Championship. In these he scored 425 runs at an average of 15.17, whilst with his left-arm medium pace bowling he took 12 wickets at an average of 30.83. In 1930, he would score 385 runs at an average of 12.83 from 20 matches, whilst with the ball he took 14 wickets at an average of 43.28. In 1931, he scored 369 runs at an average of 13.17 from 22 matches. He took 10 wickets at an average of 34.50 during the season, claiming his first five wicket haul (5 for 62), which came against Gloucestershire at Bristol in May. In 1932, his 23 appearances yielded him 723 runs at an average of 21.90, with five half centuries. He was seldom used as a bowler during the season, taking 5 wickets.

=== Consistent all-rounder ===
Creese passed a thousand runs in a season for the first time in 1933, scoring 1,275 at an average of 35.41 from 27 appearances; during the course of the season he scored two centuries. His maiden first-class century with an unbeaten 165 runs against Middlesex in June, with Creese helping lead Hampshire's recovery from 126 for 5 by putting on a partnership of 162 runs for the sixth wicket with Alec Kennedy. A second century (101 not out) followed later in the season against Essex. He was used as a bowler more frequently in 1933, taking 21 wickets at an average of 37.52. The following season, Creese scored 909 runs at an average of 23.30 from 27 matches, and although he did not score a century, he did manage to record six half centuries. For the first time with the ball, he took over fifty wickets in a season, with 52 at an average of 31.92; he took five wickets or more in an innings twice. He passed a thousand runs in a season for the second time in 1935, scoring 1,153 runs at an average of 25.62; his lone century that season, a score of 130 runs, came against Essex in the County Championship in August. With the retirement of Kennedy, Creese's bowling workload alongside Stuart Boyes, Gerry Hill, and Lofty Herman increased in 1935. Throughout the season, he took 68 wickets at an average of 24.16; he took five wickets or more in an innings on three occasions, with best figures of 7 for 55 against Glamorgan in July. In August, Creese was chosen to play for the Players in the Gentlemen versus Players match at Folkestone.

Creese again passed a thousand runs in a season in 1936, with 1,331 at an average of 30.95 from 31 matches. He did not score any centuries during the season, but passed fifty on eight occasions. He was to enjoy his best season with the ball, taking 95 wickets at an average of 22.93; he took five or more wickets in an innings on five occasions, with career-best figures of 8 for 37 against Lancashire at Southampton at the end of July. He ended the season as Hampshire's second highest wicket-taker in the County Championship, behind Herman (107 wickets). Creese endured an injury-hit season in 1937, that limited his appearances to just 18. Despite this, he still managed to take 57 wickets at an average of 25.54; against Warwickshire, he took ten-wickets in a match for the only time in his career. In May, he had been invited to tour India with Lord Tennyson's XI following the 1937 season, but was not included in the final touring team. He made 32 first-class appearances in 1938, scoring 1,421 runs at an average of 28.42; alongside ten half centuries, he also made one century. With the ball, he took 39 wickets at an average of 24.02. Creese would pass a thousand runs in a season (1,240) for the last time in 1939. He would make two centuries during the season, including his highest first-class score, a double-century (241 runs) against Northamptonshire; his innings included 37 fours. With the ball, he took 31 wickets at an average of 30.93, taking his final five wicket haul (5 for 31) against Gloucestershire. With the outbreak of the Second World War, his career with Hampshire came to an abrupt end.

In the early part of the war, he went to Argentina where he coached cricket. He would before return to England in 1944, and join the British Army as a non-commissioned officer, holding the rank of lance corporal. In the latter part of the war, he would play inter-regimental cricket. Creese remained in the army following the conclusion of the war in 1945, with him being attached to the 12th Infantry Training Corps in Canterbury. He returned to first-class cricket in 1946, when he played twice for the Combined Services against Oxford University and Surrey.

=== Minor counties cricket ===
After leaving the army, Creese was employed as Sherborne School's cricket coach in 1947, where he also ran the school sports shop. Amongst the pupils he would coach was the future Test cricketer David Sheppard. He remained cricket coach at Sherborne until 1954, with the Old Shirburnian magazine remarking that he had "exerted a considerable influence on the life of the School" during his seven years there. Alongside coaching at Sherborne, he played minor counties cricket for Dorset in 1949 and 1951, making 21 appearances in the Minor Counties Championship. Creese also umpired at minor counties level in 1947 and 1948.

=== Playing style and statistics ===
Creese was a hard-hitting left-handed batsman who played predominantly off the back foot, with his shot selection characterised by its late execution. John Arlott described Creese as "sturdily built, strong, brave and a combative – but inconsistent – cricketer", adding that while Creese was unsure against spin bowling he was outstanding against pace bowling: "it often seemed that the faster the bowling, the better he liked it". Alluding to his strength, Arlott described his straight drive as "a stroke of quite spectacular ferocity". Wisden made note that he scored most of his runs through straight drives and leg-side strokes. For Hampshire, he made 278 first-class appearances, scoring 9,894 runs at an average of 24.01; he scored six centuries and 50 half centuries.

Creese was a left-arm bowler who possessed a low, busy action. On responsive wickets, he could generate sharp turn. There was debate as to the speed at which he bowled, with opinions varying between medium-slow to fast-medium. His bowling speed drew later comparisons to Derek Underwood. For Hampshire, he took 401 wickets at an average of 27.78, claiming five or more wickets in an innings on 15 occasions.

The Portsmouth Evening News described Creese as a "smart field", whilst Arlott opined that he was a "safe catcher" at gully, short leg, or cover-point. For Hampshire, he took 190 catches.

== Later life ==
Creese left Sherborne at the end of 1954 to become head groundsman at the Central Recreation Ground in Hastings. In September 1963, his grandson, two-year-old David Blackman, was crushed to death by a roller at the Central Recreation Ground; Creese himself was injured whilst attempting to save him. He had been attending the match between the touring West Indians and Arthur Gilligan's eleven with his parents, and had run onto the pitch during an interval between innings. The incident was said by Arlott to have filled Creese with inconsolable grief for the remainder of his life. In the late 1950s, Creese was the landlord of the Dripping Well public house in Hastings. In September 1965, he was appointed head groundsman at the County Ground in Hove. There, he immediately oversaw the renovation of the ground and the laying of new turf. Creese left the County Ground in 1970, being reappointed head groundsman back at the Central Recreation Ground. Between his first and second spells at the Central Recreation Ground, the standard of the wicket had declined to such an extent that, by 1970, the standard was insufficient for the ground to host first-class cricket. Creese set about returning the wicket to first-class standard, and by 1972 first-class cricket returned to the ground. In December 1972, he retired as groundsman and was made an honorary life member of the Hastings and St Leonards Priory Cricket Club.

In his final years, Creese lived at Seaford in East Sussex. He died in Buckland Hospital in Dover on 9 March 1974. He was survived by his wife, Emily, and two daughters; he had married Emily in 1931.
