= Harmony Gold Mine Cricket Club A Ground =

Cricket ground in Virginia, South Africa

Ground information
- Location: Virginia, Free State
- Country: South Africa

Team information
Impalas	(1986/87)
Orange Free State (later Free State)	(1986/87–1996/97)

Harmony Gold Mine Cricket Club A Ground is a cricket ground in Virginia, Free State, South Africa, near to the Harmony Gold mines. The ground hosted four first-class matches, 19 List A matches and two other matches between 1966 and 1996; the ground has been the home venue for Orange Free State (later Free State) and Impalas.

== History ==
The first recorded match at the Harmony Gold Mine Cricket Club A Ground was a one day match in December 1966 between Orange Free State Country Districts and Australians. Australians won by 7 wickets, but carried on batting after winning the match, with Grahame Thomas scoring 95 runs. In the 1967/68 season, the ground hosted another one day match, this time between Orange Free State and South Africa Country Districts; the match ended in a draw. In November 1986, the Harmony Gold Mine Cricket Club A Ground hosted its first first-class and List A matches. On 19 November, Impalas played Western Province in a List A fixture as part of the 1986/87 Benson & Hedges Series; Western Province won the match by 134 runs. Eight days later, the ground hosted a 3-day first-class match between South African Board President's XI and an Australian XI; Brian Whitfield scored 129* in the South African Board President's XI first innings, and they the match by 3 wickets. The last recorded first-class match at the ground was between Orange Free State and Transvaal in 1991/92, which Orange Free State won by 101 runs, and the last recorded List A match at the ground was between Free State and Easterns in the 1996/97 Standard Bank League, and was won by Easterns by 89 runs. The ground holds the record for lowest scores for (Orange) Free State in all matches against Transvaal (now Gauteng), Impalas and Sri Lankans, with totals of 121, 187, and 221 respectively.

In 2014, a rockfall in an illegal gold mine behind the cricket ground almost trapped 200 miners.
