= Benjamin Wallach =

South African cricketer

Personal information
- Born: 18 September 1873; Queenstown, Cape Colony
- Died: 25 May 1935 (aged 61); Troyeville, Johannesburg, South Africa
- Batting: Right-handed
- Role: Wicket-keeper

Domestic team information
- Years: Team
- 1897-98 to 1904-05: Transvaal

Career statistics
Competition	First-class
Matches	15
Runs scored	108
Batting average	9.81
100s/50s	0/0
Top score	30
Catches/stumpings	16/11
- Source: CricketArchive, 15 May 2019

Benjamin Wallach (18 September 1873 – 25 May 1935) was a South African cricketer who played in first-class matches in South Africa and England between 1898 and 1905. He was born in Queenstown, Cape Colony, and died in Troyeville, Johannesburg.

Wallach was a lower-order right-handed batsman and a wicketkeeper. He played a couple of matches for Transvaal at the end of the 1897–98 South African cricket season, but then disappeared from first-class cricket for four years. When he reappeared, it was in England where, in the 1902 season, he played twice for W. G. Grace's London County Cricket Club and once for the Marylebone Cricket Club (MCC). Returning to South Africa, he played his only full season of first-class cricket for Transvaal in 1903–04 and was then selected for the South African cricket team in England in 1904, a tour that did not include Test matches. In the event, as reserve wicketkeeper, he played in only three first-class games, also appearing once for London County, and after a final match for Transvaal in 1904–05, his first-class career was over.
