= Welkom Mines Recreation Ground =

Multi purpose stadium in Welkom, Free State, South Africa

- Location: Welkom, Free State

Construction
- Groundbreaking: 1954
- Opened: 1954

Tenant
- Orange Free State cricket team (occasional) (1954-1963)

Website
- Cricinfo

Welkom Mines Recreation Ground is a multi purpose stadium in Welkom, Free State. The ground is mostly used for local cricket matches. It also hosted three first-class matches between 1954 and 1963 as the home ground for the Orange Free State cricket team, the first being a loss to the Transvaal cricket team by nine wickets on November 26, 27 and 29; 1954 as a part of the 1954/55 Currie Cup.
