= Frank Milligan =

English cricketer

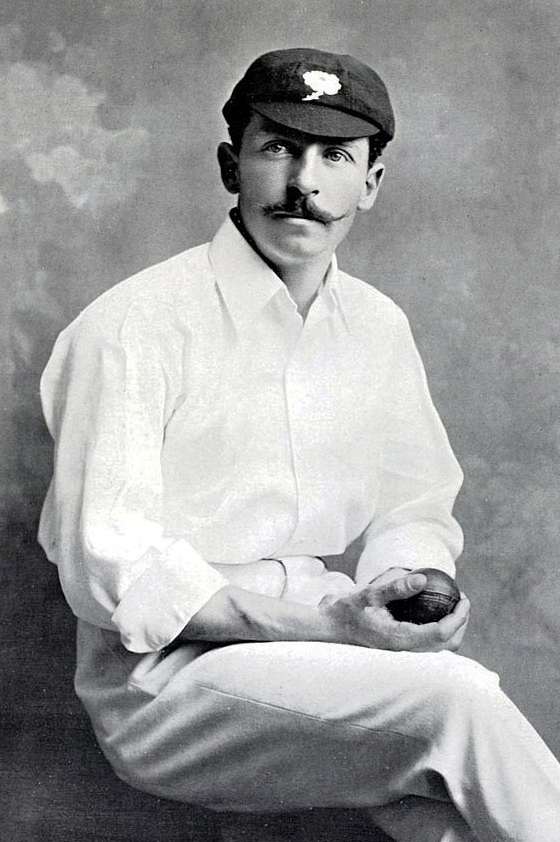

Personal information
- Full name: Frank William Milligan
- Born: 19 March 1870; Farnborough, Hampshire, England
- Died: 31 March 1900 (aged 30); Ramatlabama, South African Republic
- Batting: Right-handed
- Bowling: Right-arm fast

International information
- National side: England

Career statistics
Competition	Tests	First-class
Matches	2	95
Runs scored	58	2,232
Batting average	14.50	17.85
100s/50s	0/0	0/10
Top score	38	74
Balls bowled	45	6646
Wickets	0	144
Bowling average	–	23.54
5 wickets in innings	–	6
10 wickets in match	–	2
Best bowling	–	7/61
Catches/stumpings	1/–	52/–
- Source: Cricinfo, 29 December 2017

Frank William Milligan (19 March 1870 – 31 March 1900) was an English amateur first-class cricketer, who played in two Tests in 1899. He died in the campaign to relieve Mafeking during the Second Boer War.

Born in Farnborough, Hampshire, England, Milligan was a talented all-rounder who bowled at a lively pace, fielded well and went for his strokes with the bat. He excelled for the Gentlemen v Players at The Oval in 1897, scoring 47 in each innings, and snaring two wickets for three runs in the Players' second innings; while at Scarborough a year later he took seven second innings wickets for 61. He played County Championship cricket for Yorkshire County Cricket Club, despite having been born outside the county boundaries, and achieved ten half centuries and 144 wickets in a total of 95 first-class games from 1894 to 1898–99. He played his two Test matches on Lord Hawke's tour of South Africa in 1898–99.

He stayed on in South Africa after the tour, and served under Colonel Plumer in the Second Boer War, holding the rank of lieutenant at the time of his death in action in Ramatlabama, South Africa, at the age of 30. A memorial window, as well as a memorial brass, were dedicated to him in St Mark's church, Low Moor (which is now a private house). There is a memorial sundial to him in the rose garden of Harold Park, Bradford, West Yorkshire.
