= Cole Abrahams =

South African cricket player

Personal information
- Full name: Cole Abrahams
- Born: 19 May 1999 (age 27); Johannesburg, Gauteng, South Africa
- Batting: Right-handed
- Bowling: Right-arm off break
- Role: Batter

Domestic team information
- Years: Team
- 2023–2024: Lions
- 2024–2025: Northern Cape
- 2025–present: Knights

Career statistics
Competition	FC	LA	T20
Matches	10	13	13
Runs scored	368	287	347
Batting average	26.28	28.70	34.70
100s/50s	1/1	0/2	0/3
Top score	129	82	66
Balls bowled
Wickets	-	-	-
Bowling average
5 wickets in innings
10 wickets in match
Best bowling
Catches/stumpings
- Source: , 3 October 2026

Cole Abrahams (born 19 May 1999) is a South African cricket player who plays as a top order batsman and right-arm off spinner. Domestically he plays for the Knights and Delfos at the GCB Premier League.

== Early life ==
Cole Abrahams was born in Johannesburg, Gauteng, South Africa. He attended Cliffview Primary School, where he playing cricket at the age of 8 as an opening batsman. At the age of 9, he was selected for the Gauteng Central School's Development. He attended Parktown Boys High School, where he received full colours for cricket. He captained the 1st XI in his final year.

== Career ==
After finishing high school, Abrahams travelled to the United Kingdom to pursue his cricket career and spent two summers there. In 2018, he played for Monton CC and in 2019 he played for the Waterlooville CC. He scored over 700 runs in both seasons. He played for the Rhinos Colt and his efforts secured him a contract with the Gauteng Lions Senior provincial squad ahead of the 2023–24 season.

In 2025, Abrahams joined Kendal CC in the ECB Northern Premier League, where he scored 730 runs and won the league with Kendal CC. In 2026, he scored 711 across all formats for the team. In May 2025, he was signed to Knights from Kendal CC.

Abrahams is a Cricket South Africa accredited coach.
