= Cape Province cricket team =

South African cricket team

The Cape Province cricket team and its predecessor the Cape Colony cricket team were South African cricket teams that played 11 matches against English touring teams between 1888 and 1948. The last five of these matches had first-class status.

The team brought together players from the four first-class teams in Cape Province – Western Province, Eastern Province, Border and Griqualand West. The team did not take part in the South African domestic competition, the Currie Cup; its four constituent teams competed separately. The Cape Colony team won one of its early matches, but all five of the Cape Colony/Province's first-class matches resulted in victories to the English team by wide margins.

== Matches ==
=== Cape Colony ===
==== Not first-class ====
- 26, 27, 28 December 1888, at Newlands, Cape Town. R. G. Warton's XI won by 11 runs. R. G. Warton's XI 122 and 162; Cape Colony XV 159 and 114.
- 17, 18, 19 January 1889, at Pirates Cricket Club, Ground, Kimberley. Cape Colony won by 10 wickets. R. G. Warton's XI 91 and 212; Cape Colony XV 267 and 37 for 4. Frederick Klinck scored 81 for Cape Colony, easily the highest score on either side.
- 23, 24, 26 December 1891, at Newlands, Cape Town. Drawn. W. W. Read's XI 180 and 218 for 2 dec.; Cape Colony XV 197 and 142 for 10.
- 6, 7 January 1892, at St George's Park, Port Elizabeth. W. W. Read's XI won by an innings and 39 runs. W. W. Read's XI 246; Cape Colony XV 97 and 110.
- 14, 15, 16 January 1892, at Eclectics Cricket Club Ground, Kimberley. W. W. Read's XI won by an innings and 17 runs. Cape Colony XV 142 and 77; W. W. Read's XI 236.
- 1, 2, 3 January 1896, at Newlands, Cape Town. Lord Hawke's XI won by an innings and 125 runs. Cape Colony XIII 118 and 162; Lord Hawke's XI 405.

==== First-class ====
On the 1895-96 tour the English team met a provincial team on level terms, 11-a-side, for the first time, when Lord Hawke's XI played Western Province towards the end of the tour. It was thus the first first-class match in these tours outside the Tests. On the next tour in 1898-99 there were three first-class provincial matches, one against Transvaal and two against Cape Colony.

- 14, 16, 17 January 1899, at St George's Park, Port Elizabeth. Lord Hawke's XI won by 101 runs. Lord Hawke's XI 134 and 228; Cape Colony 112 and 149.
- 25, 27, 28 March 1899, at Newlands, Cape Town. Lord Hawke's XI won by an innings and 29 runs. Cape Colony 110 and 138; Lord Hawke's XI 277.

=== Cape Province ===
By the time of England's 1913-14 tour, South African domestic cricket was considered strong enough for all seven of the Currie Cup teams to meet touring teams on level terms in first-class matches. The Cape Province team played its first match.

- 21, 22 November 1913, at St George's Park, Port Elizabeth. MCC won by an innings and 167 runs. MCC 385; Cape Province 158 and 60. The scheduled three-day match was completed in two.
- 24, 26 January 1931, at Jan Smuts Ground, East London. MCC won by an innings and 49 runs. Cape Province 156 and 131; MCC 336 for 8 dec. The scheduled three-day match was completed in two.
- 6, 8, 9 November 1948, at Newlands, Cape Town. MCC won by 10 wickets. Cape Province 225 and 323; MCC 456 and 93 for no wicket. Owen Wynne scored 105 and 48; he was the only Cape Colony/Province player to score a century. He played in the first three Tests of the series that began a month later.
