= Claude Carter =

South African cricketer (1881–1952)

- Carter in 1912

Personal information
- Full name: Claude Pagdett Carter
- Born: 23 April 1881; Durban, Colony of Natal
- Died: 8 November 1952 (aged 71); Durban, South Africa
- Height: 5 ft 6 in (1.68 m)
- Batting: Right-handed
- Bowling: Slow left-arm orthodox

International information
- National side: South Africa

Domestic team information
- Years: Team
- 1897–98 to 1907–08, 1912–13 to 1923–24: Natal
- 1910–11: Transvaal

Career statistics
Competition	Tests	First-class
Matches	10	107
Runs scored	181	1333
Batting average	18.10	11.69
100s/50s	0/0	0/3
Top score	45	80*
Balls bowled	1475	15735
Wickets	28	366
Bowling average	24.78	18.56
5 wickets in innings	2	23
10 wickets in match	0	2
Best bowling	6/50	7/37
Catches/stumpings	2/-	64/-
- Source: CricketArchive, 4 February 2017

Claude Pagdett Carter, sometimes known as Claude Paget Carter (23 April 1881 in Durban, Colony of Natal – 8 November 1952 in Durban, Natal) was a South African cricketer who played in 10 Tests from 1912 to 1924.

Shortly after leaving the Durban Boys' Model School at the age of 16, Carter began playing first-class cricket for Natal, and eventually played for them from 1898 to 1923, except for a season with Transvaal in 1910–11. He toured England with the South African teams of 1912 and 1924. He was South Africa's leading bowler in the series against Australia in South Africa in 1921–22, when he took 15 wickets at an average of 21.93.

He played a season of club cricket in Yorkshire in 1905, and later played Lancashire League cricket for Lowerhouse in 1925 and 1926, and represented Cornwall in the Minor Counties Championship in 1930 and 1935.
