= Johannes Kotze =

South African cricketer (1879–1931)

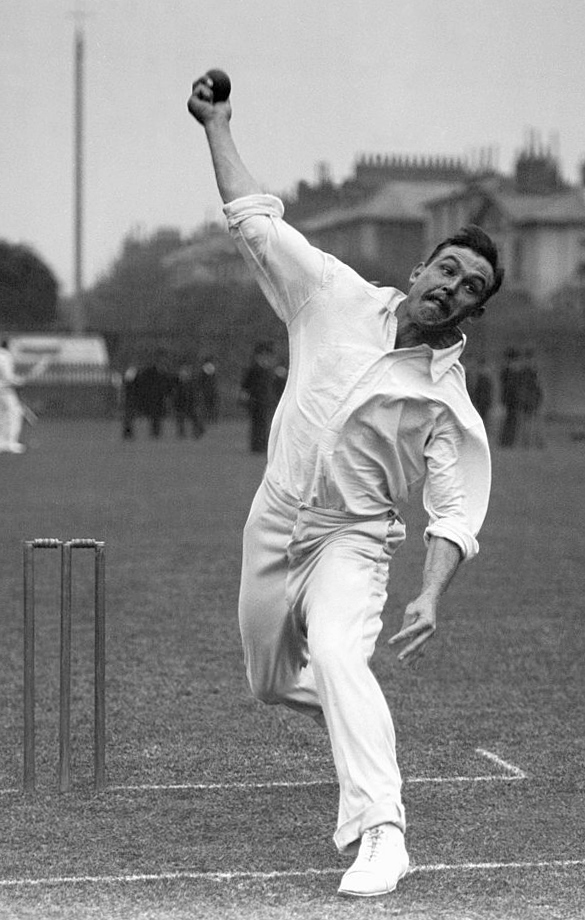
- Kotze pictured in about 1905

Personal information
- Full name: Johannes Jacobus Kotze
- Born: 7 August 1879; Hopefield, Cape Colony
- Died: 7 July 1931 (aged 51); Rondebosch, South Africa
- Nickname: Kodgee
- Batting: Right-handed
- Bowling: Right-arm fast

International information
- National side: South Africa
- Test debut: 18 October 1902 v Australia
- Last Test: 1 July 1907 v England

Domestic team information
- Years: Team
- 1902-03: Transvaal
- 1903/04–1910/11: Western Province

Career statistics
Competition	Test	First-class
Matches	3	72
Runs scored	2	688
Batting average	0.40	8.59
100s/50s	0/0	0/1
Top score	2	60
Balls bowled	413	12,480
Wickets	6	348
Bowling average	40.50	17.86
5 wickets in innings	0	30
10 wickets in match	0	9
Best bowling	3/64	8/18
Catches/stumpings	3/–	31/–
- Source: Cricinfo, 11 May 2025

Johannes Jacobus "Kodgee" Kotze, or Kotzé (7 August 1879 – 7 July 1931) was a cricketer from Cape Colony who played in three Test matches for South Africa from 1902 to 1907. He was considered one of the fastest bowlers of his time. He toured England with the South African teams in 1901, 1904 and 1907.

== Cricket career ==
At his death in 1931, Wisden ranked Kotze as one of the half-dozen fastest bowlers there had ever been. He was able to maintain his speed for long spells, and could bowl as fast late in the day as at the start. He was a poor batsman and clumsy fielder, though, which may have told against him when the South African Test teams were selected. He was one of very few prominent Afrikaner cricketers of the period; he was the only Afrikaner in South Africa's 1901 tour of England, which took place during the Second Boer War.

Kotze had played no first-class cricket and was virtually unknown when he was a surprise selection to tour England with the South African team in 1901. In the event, he was one of the four principal bowlers on the tour, taking 49 first-class wickets at an average of 24.79, including 7 for 31 and 3 for 51 in the victory over Nottinghamshire. No Test matches were played during the tour.

When the Australian team made a short tour of South Africa in 1902–03, Kotze played in two of the three Tests, taking six wickets. His first two wickets were those of Victor Trumper and Clem Hill. Later that season, playing for Transvaal against Griqualand West in the Currie Cup, he took 8 for 18 and 3 for 19; all but one of his victims were bowled. In this match he took the first hat-trick in South African first-class cricket. Transvaal won the Currie Cup that season, and Kotze was the leading bowler in the competition, with 34 wickets at an average of 7.29.

In 1903–04, Kotze played for Western Province in the Currie Cup. He took 11 wickets in the final, but Transvaal won, taking the title again. On the tour of England in 1904, Kotze was the leading wicket-taker, and one of the leading bowlers of the English season, with 121 wickets at an average of 19.85. Again no Tests were played during the tour, but in two matches against MCC at Lord's, Kotze took 10 wickets at low cost, eight of them bowled.

== Personal life ==
Kotze married Cecilia Hendrina Van Schoor in the Cape Colony village of Philadelphia in March 1905. They lived in Rondebosch, and had four children.

Kotze died suddenly in July 1931, aged 51. He and his wife were at the seaside at Cape Town when he told her he was feeling unwell and returned to their home in Sunnybrae Road, Rondebosch, where he died of a heart attack. He had had heart trouble for the previous 18 months. On his death certificate his occupation was given as "retired farmer".
