= Victoria Ground (Qonce) =

Cricket ground

Coordinates: 32°52′49″S 27°23′9″E

- Location: Qonce
- Country: South Africa

Victoria Ground is a sports ground in Qonce (formerly King William's Town), Eastern Cape, South Africa. It is located near the centre of the town, at the southern corner of the intersection of Buffalo Road and Cathcart Street, about 250 metres east of the Buffalo River.

The ground's first recorded cricket match took place in February 1889, when the touring English team played two matches there against the team of the Cape Mounted Riflemen. It served as an occasional first-class cricket ground for Border for seven matches between 1903 and 1958, and later staged six List A cricket matches for Border and the Impalas between 1988 and 1991.

Border won three, lost one, and drew three of the first-class matches. There were three centuries, all by Border's opponents, the highest of them 144 by Tony Harris of Transvaal when Transvaal won in 1947–48. The best bowling figures were 7 for 48 by Jimmy Sinclair of Transvaal, who bowled unchanged throughout the Border first innings in 1906–07.

Border's highest individual scores at the ground were made by the openers in the match against the touring English team in 1913-14: Sidney Fuller made 72 and Ronnie Randell made 71, and they put on 114 for the first wicket. Border's best bowling figures were 6 for 16 (22–16–16–6) by Dudley Phillips in the victory over Rhodesia in 1929–30.

The highest score in a List A match at the ground was 151 (retired hurt) by Kevin Robinson for Natal against Border Country Districts in 1990–91.
