= George Thornton (cricketer) =

English cricketer (1867–1939)

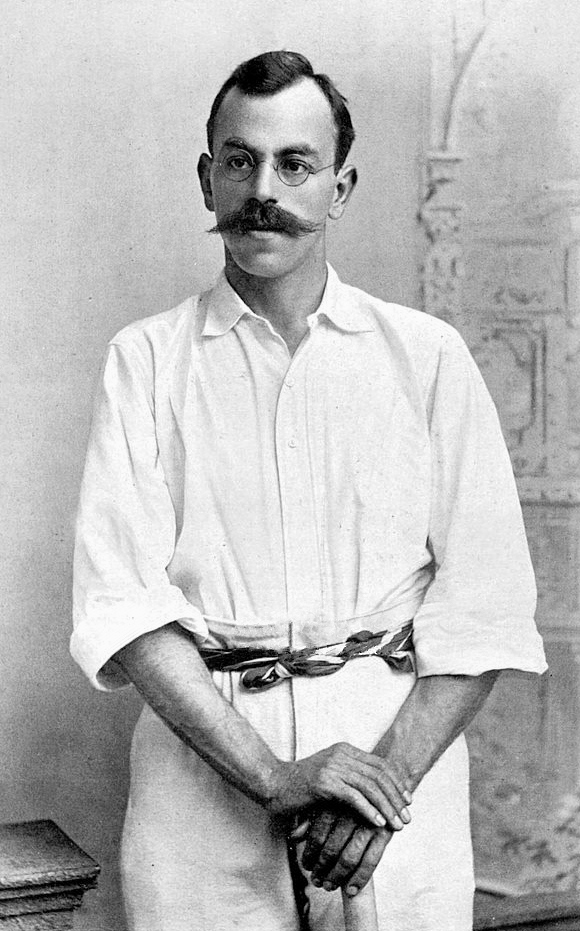
- Thornton in about 1895

Personal information
- Born: 24 December 1867; Skipton, Yorkshire, England
- Died: 31 January 1939 (aged 71); Kensington, London, England
- Batting: Left-handed
- Bowling: Slow left-arm orthodox

International information
- National side: South Africa
- Only Test: 11 October 1902 v Australia

Career statistics
Competition	Test	First-class
Matches	1	41
Runs scored	1	1,263
Batting average	–	22.55
100s/50s	0/0	1/4
Top score	1*	161
Balls bowled	24	1,968
Wickets	1	32
Bowling average	20.00	31.46
5 wickets in innings	0	1
10 wickets in match	0	0
Best bowling	1/20	5/20
Catches/stumpings	1/–	13/–
- Source: CricketArchive, 10 September 2022

George Thornton (24 December 1867 – 31 January 1939) was an English amateur first-class cricketer, who played County Championship cricket for Yorkshire County Cricket Club in three matches in 1891, and later that decade for Middlesex, and later appeared in a Test match representing South Africa in 1902.

== Life and career ==
Thornton was born in Skipton, Yorkshire, England. He was educated at Skipton Grammar School, and the University of Edinburgh, where he studied medicine.

Thornton occasionally played for Yorkshire and Middlesex before going to South Africa when the South African Wars broke out. Thornton was one of the first to volunteer, and was appointed head of the Government Hospital in Pretoria. Thornton spent nine years in South Africa and, during his stay, he played cricket for Transvaal, and for South Africa at the Old Wanderers, Johannesburg. This was in the first Test match that Australia played in South Africa in October 1902, when the Australian side, led by Joe Darling, were on their way home from their tour of England.

A left-handed batsman and bowler, Thornton peaked in 1895 when for Middlesex he averaged 31.00 with the bat, and took 23 wickets. He triumphed with the ball against Gloucestershire at Lord's. The fifth bowler used, he bowled W. G. Grace, who had scored 169, and in the last innings of the match took all five wickets that fell, finishing with a match return of nine wickets for 72. In the corresponding fixture the next season, Thornton recorded his highest first-class score of 161, as Middlesex won by an innings and 77 runs. However, in that match, he was not used as a bowler.

Thornton died in January 1939, in Kensington, London, England, aged 71.
