= Lord's No. 1 Ground =

Cricket ground in Durban, South Africa

Lord's
- Lord's No. 1 Ground

Ground information
- Location: Durban, South Africa
- Country: South Africa
- Establishment: 1888
- Demolished: 1922
- Capacity: n/a
- Owner: n/a
- Operator: Natal cricket team
- Tenants: Natal cricket team
- End names
- n/a

International information
- First Test: 21 January 1910: South Africa v England
- Last Test: 5 November 1921: South Africa v Australia
- As of 19 April 2023; Source: Cricinfo

Lord's No. 1 Ground also known as Lord's was a cricket ground in Durban, South Africa. The ground is believed to have been located on the current site of railway tracks leading to Durban railway station. It hosted 4 matches of Test cricket between 1910 and 1921 with the 2nd Test in 1909/10 and the 1st and 4th Tests in 1913/14, all between South Africa and England, and the 1st Test in 1921/22 between South Africa and Australia. The ground was demolished in 1922.

There were at least four cricket grounds in the Lord's parklands. The entire 1910–11 Currie Cup tournament was played on the Lord's No. 1, Lord's No. 3 and Lord's No. 4 grounds: 21 two-day first-class matches between 13 and 28 March 1911.

== International centuries ==
Four Test centuries were scored on the ground.

No.	Player	Score	Date	Team	Opposing team	Result
1	Gordon White	118	21 January 1910	South Africa (Note: The British colonies in South Africa did not use a common flag until 1910 when the Union of South Africa was created and the South Africa Red Ensign was used as the de facto flag for the colony.)	England	South Africa won
2	Herbie Taylor	109	13 December 1913	South Africa	England	England won
3	Johnny Douglas	119	13 December 1913	England	South Africa	England won
4	Charles Macartney	116	5 November 1921	Australia	South Africa	Drawn

== Five-wicket hauls ==
Nine five-wicket hauls were taken in the four Test matches played on the ground. The ground no longer exists.

Five-wicket hauls in Men's Test matches at Lord's Number 1 Ground
No.	Bowler	Date	Team	Opposing Team	Inn	O	R	W	Result
1	Bert Vogler	21 January 1910	South Africa	England	2	30	83	5	South Africa won
2	Aubrey Faulkner	21 January 1910	South Africa	England	4	33.4	87	6	South Africa won
3	Sydney Barnes (Note: Barnes took two five-wicket hauls in both of the matches on the ground in 1913 and 1914.)	13 December 1913	England	South Africa	1	19.4	57	5	England won
4	Sydney Barnes	13 December 1913	England	South Africa	3	25	48	5	England won
5	Sydney Barnes	14 February 1914	England	South Africa	1	29.5	56	7	Drawn
6	Claude Carter	14 February 1914	South Africa	England	2	28	50	6	Drawn
7	Sydney Barnes	14 February 1914	England	South Africa	3	32	88	7	Drawn
8	Jimmy Blanckenberg	5 November 1921	South Africa	Australia	1	24.4	78	5	Drawn
9	Jack Gregory	5 November 1921	Australia	South Africa	2	25.1	77	6	Drawn

== See also ==
- List of Test cricket grounds
- Sahara Stadium Kingsmead
