= Jack Board =

English cricketer

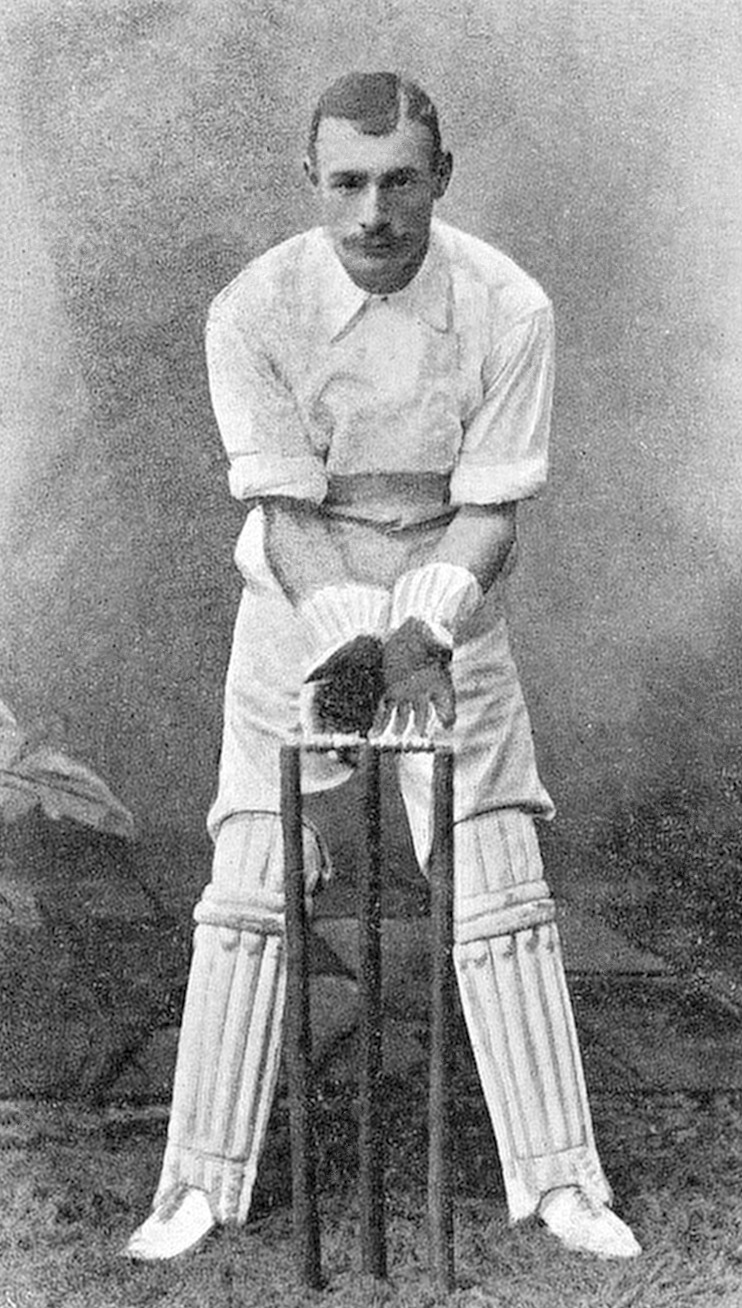
- Jack Board

Personal information
- Full name: John Henry Board
- Born: 23 February 1867; Clifton, Bristol
- Died: 15 April 1924 (aged 57); At sea
- Batting: Right-handed
- Role: Wicketkeeper-batsman

International information
- National side: England
- Test debut: 14 February 1899 v South Africa
- Last Test: 30 March 1906 v South Africa

Domestic team information
- Years: Team
- 1891–1914: Gloucestershire
- 1900–1904: London County
- 1910/11–1913/14: Hawke's Bay

Career statistics
Competition	Test	First-class
Matches	6	525
Runs scored	108	15,674
Batting average	10.80	19.37
100s/50s	0/0	9/64
Top score	29	214
Catches/stumpings	8/3	851/355
- Source: Cricinfo, 6 November 2022

John Henry Board (23 February 1867 – 15 April 1924) was an English cricketer who played in six Tests from 1899 to 1906.

Jack Board was a wicketkeeper and a right-handed batsman who started out as a tail-ender but developed into a useful player who often opened the innings for his county, Gloucestershire. Picked by W. G. Grace out of Bristol club cricket for the South v North match at Lord's in 1891, Board went straight into the Gloucestershire side afterwards and stayed there for 20 years. In 1895, he set the county record for dismissals in a season, with 75. He had few equals as a catcher, his takes from Fred Roberts were recalled many years later. As a batsman, he scored 214 in 210 minutes against Somerset in 1900, the highest by a Gloucestershire wicketkeeper, and in 1903 he shared in a sixth wicket partnership of 320 with Gilbert Jessop against Sussex at Hove, though his share was just 71, while Jessop scored 286. The stand remains the county record for the sixth wicket. Gilbert Jessop said he transformed himself by sheer hard practice from a batsman of uncouth methods into one of much reliability, although "the majority of his runs were made on the on-side, and the manner in which he 'huddled' in front of his wicket made one tremble for his fate every ball." He was also renowned as a poor judge of a run: "the number of friends run out by him must have exceeded by far the number of foes."

Board toured Australia in 1897-98 under A.E. Stoddart without playing in the Tests, and twice toured South Africa, where he played his only Tests. He went with Lord Hawke in 1898–99, and won his first two Test caps; he top-scored in his first Test innings, but then never exceeded the 29 he scored in that match. In 1905–06, he played in four Test matches in the tour led by Plum Warner.

Board was born in Clifton, Bristol. A gardener by trade before he took to professional cricket, he became a well-known cricket coach at the end of his career. His first wife died in 1907 and in 1921 he married a Mrs Young, daughter of Mr Matthews, a retired water bailiff of Oxford.

From 1910, he went each winter to New Zealand, where he coached and played for Hawke's Bay, returning each English summer for a few games for Gloucestershire. After the First World War, he became an umpire in English cricket and combined that with winters in South Africa coaching. It was on the return trip from South Africa to England in 1924 aboard the Kenilworth Castle that he had a heart attack and died. He was buried at sea.
