= Alfred Soames =

South African cricket umpire

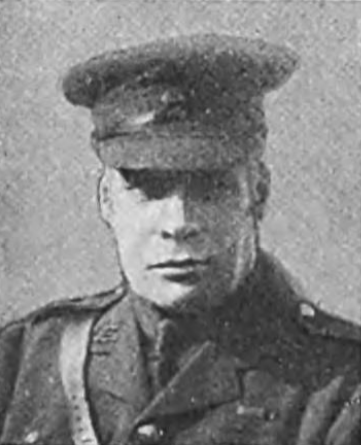

Personal information
- Born: 16 September 1862; Mildenhall, Wiltshire, England
- Died: 13 October 1915 (aged 53); Hulluch, France

Umpiring information
- Tests umpired: 2 (1899–1902)
- Source: Cricinfo, 7 June 2019

Alfred Soames DSO (16 September 1862 – 13 October 1915) was an English-born South African cricket umpire and soldier.

Soames was born in Mildenhall, Wiltshire, where his father was rector. He was educated at Haileybury School in England. He served as a lieutenant with the Buffs in the Second Boer War, and was awarded the Distinguished Service Order in 1902 for his service.

Soames umpired 15 first-class matches in South Africa between 1891 and 1902, including two Test matches in 1899 and 1902 and three Currie Cup finals. He gave the English batsman Pelham Warner not out in response to a stumping appeal in the 1899 Test, and later admitted it was a mistake that had probably cost South Africa victory.

Soames served as a major with the Buffs in World War I, and was mentioned in dispatches. He died in action in October 1915 at Hulluch in northern France and is buried at the Loos memorial.

== See also ==
- List of Test cricket umpires
