= Jan Smuts Ground =

Cricket ground in East London, South Africa

Ground information
- Location: East London, Eastern Cape
- Country: South Africa
- Establishment: c1905

Team information
Border	(1906 – 1988)
- As of 13 November 2009; Source: CricketArchive

Jan Smuts Ground (formerly known as Recreation Ground and The Oval) is a cricket ground in East London, Eastern Cape, South Africa. The first recorded match on the ground was in 1906, when the East London cricket team hosted the touring Marylebone Cricket Club (MCC). Border used the ground as their principal home ground from the 1906–07 season until 1987–88.
