= Louis Tancred =

South African cricketer

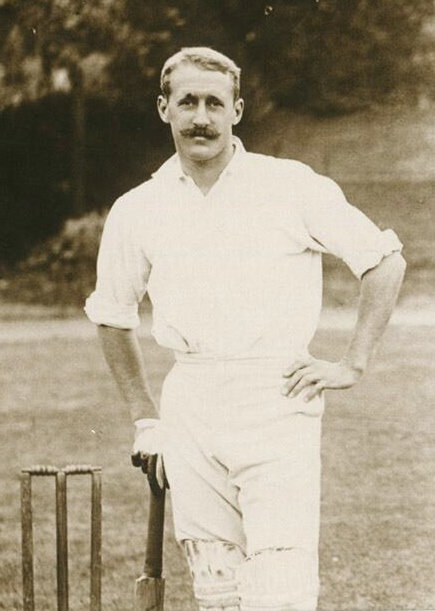

Personal information
- Born: 7 October 1876; Port Elizabeth, South Africa
- Died: 28 July 1934 (aged 57); Parktown, Johannesburg, South Africa
- Batting: Right-handed

International information
- National side: South Africa
- Test debut: 11 October 1902 v Australia
- Last Test: 26 December 1913 v England

Career statistics
Competition	Test	First-class
Matches	14	130
Runs scored	530	5,695
Batting average	21.19	27.51
100s/50s	0/2	11/27
Top score	97	160
Balls bowled	–	300
Wickets	–	8
Bowling average	–	23.75
5 wickets in innings	–	0
10 wickets in match	–	0
Best bowling	–	4/43
Catches/stumpings	3/–	73/–
- Source: Cricinfo, 19 November 2022

Louis Joseph Tancred (7 October 1876 – 28 July 1934) was a South African cricketer who played in 14 Test matches from 1902 to 1913, including three as captain.

Born into a cricketing family in Port Elizabeth, Cape Colony, Tancred attended St Aidan's College, Grahamstown where, along with his brothers Bernard and Vincent, he began to show cricketing prowess. He made his first-class debut for Transvaal against Western Province on 24 March 1897, scoring 40 and 15. The next season, Tancred starred in the Currie Cup, scoring 120 against Natal and averaging 36.12 for the season, placing him second in the batting averages.

His flourishing cricketing career was waylaid by the outbreak of the Anglo-Boer War. Tancred served as a trooper with the Western Province Mounted Rifles and awarded the Queen's Medal for bravery. While still serving in the war, Tancred was named in South Africa's touring team to England in 1901 and, after being excused from active service, Tancred joined his teammates on the boat to England. In England he played 16 first-class matches, scoring 591 runs at 21 but failed to play a Test.

Tancred eventually made his Test debut against Australia on 11 October 1902 at Johannesburg, scoring 97 and 24. His 97 was the highest score by a South African on Test debut until Andrew Hudson’s 163 against the West Indies in 1992.

Following the series against Australia, Tancred was chosen in the 1904 South African touring side to England. While there he heard of the suicide of his brother Vincent, who had reportedly been depressed over his non-selection in the team. Tancred went into seclusion for a few days before returning to the South African side to post some large scores late in the tour, including 250 against Scotland.

During the 1904/05 South African season, Tancred became the first player to score 1000 runs in Currie Cup cricket and cemented himself as one of the leading players in the country. The next season, in the First Test at Old Wanderers at Johannesburg, he was a member of the first South African team to defeat England in a Test.

In 1907 he was ill, missed the Currie Cup and initially ruled himself out of that year's tour of England but, as one of South Africa's top batsmen, he was selected anyway. He made a pair in his only Test of the tour.

In 1912 Tancred played in the Triangular Tournament between England, Australia and South Africa, including three matches as captain in the absence of the injured Frank Mitchell. Tancred averaged only 20.29 during the tour and South Africa lost all three matches he captained. He played his final Test the next season, against England at Johannesburg, making 13 and 20 and finishing with 530 Test runs at an average of 21.20.

A dour opening batsman throughout most of his career, Wisden wrote “a feature of his batting is a peculiar crouch … (which is) … anything but graceful” and that Tancred was not a good bowler and “only an average field.”

While playing cricket, Tancred worked as the secretary for a range of sporting and social clubs, while anticipating a lucrative post-cricket job as promised by the wealthy businessmen who financed South African cricket in the early years of the twentieth century. This job did not eventuate and Tancred became despondent, more so in 1913 when he was forced to petition for insolvency after endorsing the promissory notes of a fellow cricketer, Frank Dickenson, who promptly disappeared.

Upon the outbreak of World War I, Tancred enlisted in the Natal Light Horse but was discharged as being unfit for active service in 1915. His marriage to Mary Chawick later that year produced two children and following a few post War matches Tancred retired from first-class cricket in 1920. It is believed that Tancred became depressed as he struggled to live life out of the limelight that surrounded his cricketing career. His disillusionment was such that Tancred strongly advised his son Louis Jnr not to embark on a career in sport. Louis Jnr instead joined the Royal Air Force and, while working as a flight instructor, was killed aged 34 in a plane crash at the Isle of Axholme, Lincolnshire.

Tancred died in Parktown, Transvaal.
