= Free State cricket team =

South African cricket team

Free State (formerly Orange Free State) is the first-class cricket team representing the province of Free State (known as Orange Free State until 1995) in South Africa. The team was called Orange Free State from January 1904 to April 1995. Along with Griqualand West, it was a part of the Eagles franchise from October 2004.. This was one of six franchise teams created to play at a level above South Africa's provincial system. The Free State and Griqualand West teams continued as feeder teams, however. The Eagles became the Knights from the 2010/11 season onwards. In 2020, the six franchises were dissolved, but the Knights name was adopted by the Free State team for reasons of brand continuity.

== Current squad ==
Squad for 2026/27 Season. Players in bold have played international cricket.

Name	Nationality	Birth date	Batting style	Bowling style	Notes
Batters
Cole Abrahams	South Africa	19 May 1999 (age 27)	Right-handed	Right-arm orthodox spin	
Jonathan Bird	South Africa	11 April 2001 (age 25)	Left-handed	Left-arm wrist spin	
Isaac Dikgale	South Africa	14 May 1995 (age 31)	Right-handed	Right-arm seam	
Seth Fledermaus	South Africa	23 April 1999 (age 27)	Right-handed	Right-arm orthodox spin	
Ruben Maree	South Africa	17 May 2006 (age 20)	Left-handed		
**Lesego Senokwane**	South Africa	24 May 1997 (age 29)	Right-handed	Right-arm orthodox spin	Player of National Interest
Wian Ruthven	South Africa		Right-handed		
George van Heerden	South Africa	11 September 2003 (age 22)	Right-handed	Right-arm orthodox spin	
Keepers
**Gihahn Cloete**	South Africa	4 October 1992 (age 33)	Left-handed	Right-arm orthodox spin	
Ruan Haasbroek	South Africa	18 April 1997 (age 29)	Right-handed	Right-arm orthodox spin	
All-Rounders
Ross Boast	South Africa	23 February 2005 (age 21)	Right-handed	Right-arm seam	
Emmanuel Motswiri	South Africa	4 September 2000 (age 25)	Right-handed	Right-arm seam	
**Jacques Snyman**	South Africa	10 May 1994 (age 32)	Right-handed	Right-arm orthodox spin	
Tiaan van Vuuren	South Africa	18 April 1997 (age 29)	Right-handed	Left-arm seam	Player of National Interest
Bowlers
Junaid Dawood	South Africa	2 October 1996 (age 29)	Right-handed	Right-arm wrist spin	
Mbongi Mhlanga	South Africa	12 September 2003 (age 22)	Left-handed	Left-arm seam	
**Dane Piedt**	South Africa	6 March 1990 (age 36)	Right-handed	Right-arm orthodox spin	
Malusi Siboto	South Africa	20 August 1987 (age 38)	Left-handed	Right-arm seam	
Ntando Soni	South Africa	19 September 2006 (age 19)	Right-handed	Right-arm seam	
Nico van Zyl	South Africa	5 February 1999 (age 27)	Right-handed	Right-arm seam	

== Honours ==
- Currie Cup (3) – 1992–93, 1993–94, 1997–98; shared (0) –
- Standard Bank Cup (4) – 1988–89, 1993–94, 1994–95, 1995–96
- South African Airways Provincial One-Day Challenge (1) – 2004–05
- Gillette/Nissan Cup (2) – 1991–92, 1992–93

== Venues ==
Venues have included:

- Ramblers Cricket Club Ground, Bloemfontein (Jan 1904 – Feb 1986)
- South African Railways Club Old Ground, Bloemfontein (Jan 1938 – Dec 1939)
- Welkom Mines Recreation Ground (occasional venue Nov 1954 – Nov 1963)
- University of Orange Free State Ground, Bloemfontein (Oct 1986 – Dec 1993)
- Harmony Gold Mine Cricket Club A Ground, Virginia (four matches Nov 1986 – Sept 1991)
- Goodyear Park, Bloemfontein (Oct 1989–present)
- Rovers Cricket Club, Welkom (two games 1981 – 1985)

== Sources ==
- South African Cricket Annual – various editions
- Wisden Cricketers' Almanack – various editions
