= Border cricket team =

Cricket team

Border Cricket
Personnel
- Captain: Jason Niemand
- Coach: Rowan Richards
- Chief executive: Omphile Ramela

Team information
- Founded: 1898
- Home ground: Buffalo Park, East London
- Official website: Official website

Border is the team representing the Border region in domestic first-class cricket in South Africa. The team began playing in March 1898. When Cricket South Africa introduced the franchise system in 2004, Border merged with Eastern Province to form the Warriors, but both teams continued in the second eleven competitions. In 2020, the franchises were dissolved. The Warriors name was adopted by Eastern Province and Border's team was rebranded as the Eastern Cape iiNyathi (isiXhosa for "buffaloes").

== Club history ==
Border have usually been one of the weaker teams in South Africa. From their initial first-class match in 1897-98 until the end of the 2017-18 season they had played 584 matches, resulting in 173 wins, 241 losses, one tie, and 169 draws. Border hold the record for the lowest aggregate score by a first class side in a match. During a Currie Cup match against Natal at Jan Smuts Ground in 1959-60, Border scored only 34 runs in the match - 16 in the first innings and 18 in the second innings.

In November 2017, Marco Marais scored 300 not out from 191 deliveries, batting for Border against Eastern Province in the 2017–18 Sunfoil 3-Day Cup. This was the fastest triple century in first-class cricket, the ninth triple century in first-class cricket in South Africa and the first in the country since 2010.

In March 2021, Border were dismissed for just sixteen runs in their second innings in the 2020–21 CSA 3-Day Provincial Cup, equalling the lowest team total in first-class cricket in South Africa.

== Current squad ==
Squad for 2026/27 Season. Players in bold have played international cricket.

Name	Nationality	Birth date	Batting style	Bowling style	Notes
Batters
Jerome Bossr	South Africa	22 September 1998 (age 27)	Left-handed	Left-arm seam	
Christiaan du Toit	South Africa	15 September 2003 (age 22)	Right-handed	Right-arm wrist spin	
Jason Niemand	South Africa	30 November 1998 (age 27)	Right-handed	Right-arm orthodox spin	
Riley Miller	South Africa		Right-handed		High-performance Contract
Wicket-keepers
Mncedisi Malika	South Africa	12 June 1997 (age 29)	Left-handed		
Nathan Roux	South Africa	9 April 1998 (age 28)	Right-handed		
All-Rounders
Hardus Coetzer	South Africa	15 September 2002 (age 23)	Right-handed	Right-arm seam	
Michael Copeland	South Africa	4 October 2002 (age 23)	Right-handed	Right-arm orthodox spin	
Alindile Mhletywa	South Africa	2 July 1996 (age 30)	Right-handed	Right-arm seam	High-performance Contract
Thando Ntini	South Africa	7 July 2000 (age 26)	Left-handed	Right-arm seam	
Lihle Sizani	South Africa	24 May 2002 (age 24)	Right-handed	Right-arm orthodox spin	
Bowlers
Matthew Fourie	South Africa	16 October 2002 (age 23)	Right-handed	Right-arm seam	High-performance Contract
Sithembile Langa	South Africa	9 October 1995 (age 30)	Right-handed	Right-arm seam	
Kgaudise Molefe	South Africa	31 March 2004 (age 22)	Right-handed	Right-arm seam	High-performance Contract
Thozama Totana	South Africa	2 September 2002 (age 23)	Right-handed	Left-arm orthodox spin	

== Venues ==
Venues have included:

- Victoria Ground, King William's Town (occasional venue November 1903 – March 1958)
- Jan Smuts Ground, East London (main home ground March 1907 – January 1988)
- Victoria Recreation Ground, Queenstown (alternative venue March 1907 – November 1962)
- Cambridge Recreation Ground, East London (short-term venue December 1947 – January 1948)
- Buffalo Park, East London (main home ground October 1988 – present)
