= List of Eastern Province representative cricketers =

List of cricketers

This is a list of all cricketers who have played first-class, List A or Twenty20 cricket for Eastern Province cricket team in South Africa. Seasons given are first and last seasons; the player did not necessarily play in all the intervening seasons.

== A ==
- Faghme Abrahams, 1973/74-1986/87
- Shafiek Abrahams, 1992/93–2000/01
- Shukri Abrahams, 1986/87–1987/88
- Umar Abrahams, 1997/98–2009/10
- Walter Ackerman, 1970/71
- Colin Ackermann, 2005/06–2016/17
- Sean Adair, 2004/05–2011/12
- Luvuyo Adam, 2009/10–2018/19
- Charles Ahlfeldt, 1975/76–1977/78
- David Alers, 1978/79–1979/80
- Charles Allison, 1908/09–1910/11
- Peter Amm, 1987/88–1990/91
- Philip Amm, 1978/79–1996/97
- Ian Anderson, 1955/56–1958/59
- Sean Andrews, 1999/00
- Francois Anker, 1987/88
- Colin Archibald, 1963/64
- Sergio Arends, 2017/18
- Robert Armitage, 1971/72–1987/88
- Laurence Ashburnham, 1896/97
- Barry Assheton-Smith, 1939/40
- Hedley Austin, 1983/84–1984/85

== B ==
- Alan Badenhorst, 1995/96–1998/99
- Threlfall Baines, 1925/26–1926/27
- Eldine Baptiste, 1991/92–1998/99
- Peter Barclay, 1987/88–1995/96
- Eddie Barlow, 1964/65–1965/66
- C Barnes, 1910/11 (Note: Barnes played in five first–class matches for Eastern Province in the 1910/11 season. No biographical details are known.)
- Michael Barnwell, 1969/70–1970/71
- Charles Basson, 1921/22–1922/23
- Michael Basson, 1980/81
- Karl Bauermeister, 1983/84–1992/93
- Chad Baxter, 1996/97–2009/10
- Frank Bayes, 1906/07–1908/09
- Michael Beamish, 1992/93–1998/99
- Edgar Beck, 1908/09
- Mansel Bell, 1906/07
- Warren Bell, 2000/01–2013/14
- Anthony Bendel, 1962/63–1963/64
- Mark Benfield, 1999/00–2004/05
- Douglas Bennett, 1912/13
- Douglas Bennett, 1934/35–1936/37
- Hart Bennett, 1924/25–1926/27
- C Bernstein, 1939/40 (Note: Bernstein played in one first–class match for Eastern Province in the 1939/40 season. No biographical details are known.)
- Darryl Bestall, 1975/76
- Paul Bester, 1993/94
- David Bevan, 1973/74
- Simon Bezuidenhout, 1968/69–1982/83
- Dassie Biggs, 1964/65–1980/81
- Christopher Biggs, 1994/95–1998/99
- James Bilbrough, 1928/29
- Mark Billson, 1982/83–1989/90
- Andrew Birch, 2002/03–2019/20
- Adrian Birrell, 1984/85–1997/98
- Harry Birrell, 1945/46–1956/57
- Colin Bland, 1969/70–1970/71
- Alan Blenkinsop, 1951/52–1955/56
- Brian Blenkinsop, 1954/55
- Tladi Bokako, 2010/11–2017/18
- William Boltman, 1921/22–1931/32
- Maxwell Bolus, 1924/25–1925/26
- Kenneth Bond, 1966/67–1972/73
- Godfrey Borman, 1960/61–1963/64
- Hendrik Boshoff, 1981/82
- Robert Bossenger, 1964/65
- André Botha, 1993/94
- Johan Botha, 1995/96–2003/04
- Wikus Botha, 1995/96–1996/97
- Pierre Botha, 1996/97
- Basil Bradfield, 1952/53–1956/57
- Carl Bradfield, 1993/94–2003/04
- John Brann, 1910/11–1921/22
- William Brann, 1920/21–1933/34
- Matthew Breetzke, 2010/11–2018/19
- David Brickett, 1971/72–1984/85
- Harry Bridger, 1893/94 (Note: Bridger played in one first–class match for Eastern Province in the 1893/94 season. No biographical details are known.)
- Alfred Britton, 1888/89–1896/97
- Charles Britton, 1888/89–1890/91
- Dennis Broad, 1981/82
- Charles Brockway, 1951/52
- James Brodie, 1961/62–1963/64
- Stephen Brookes, 1981/82–1982/83
- Eric Brotherton, 1959/60–1960/61
- Nigel Brouwers, 1998/99–2005/06
- Duncan Brown, 1991/92
- Daniel Brown, 1929/30
- Lloyd Brown, 2010/11–2017/18
- Trevor Brown, 1957/58
- Philip Bruce, 1996/97
- James Bryant, 1993/94–2003/04
- Rudi Bryson, 1988/89–1992/93
- James Buchanan, 1936/37–1939/40
- Jaco Burger, 1989/90
- E Burgess, 1922/23 (Note: Burgess played in one first–class match for Eastern Province in the 1922/33 season. No biographical details are known.)
- WL Burgess, 1929/30 (Note: Burgess played in three first–class matches for Eastern Province in the 1929/30 season. No biographical details are known.)
- Michael Burkett, 1979/80–1980/81
- Mike Burton, 1964/65–1967/68
- David Butlion, 1973/74
- Andrew Butters, 1984/85–1985/86
- Duncan Buyskes, 1933/34

== C ==
- Andrew Cadle, 1888/89–1890/91
- Henry Calder, 1896/97
- Dave Callaghan, 1983/84–2002/03
- Jock Cameron, 1929/30
- CA Campbell, 1920/21 (Note: Campbell played in one first–class match for Eastern Province in the 1920/21 season. No biographical details are known.)
- Hamish Campbell-Rodger, 1926/27
- David Capel, 1985/86–1986/87
- Robin Capell, 1955/56–1957/58
- Deon Carolus, 2003/04–2006/07
- Gerald Carpenter, 1888/89–1890/91
- Phil Carrick, 1976/77
- Brydon Carse, 2007/08–2014/15
- James Carse, 1981/82–1986/87
- William Catton, 1890/91
- Carey Cawood, 1947/48–1949/50
- William Cawood, 1931/32
- Thomas Chambers, 1956/57
- Vernal Charles, 2004/05–2011/12
- Mathew Christensen, 2015/16–2019/20
- Omar Christie, 1903/04 (Note: Christie played in one first–class match for Eastern Province in the 1903/04 season. No biographical details are known.)
- Kirwin Christoffels, 2012/13–2017/18
- Malcolm Clark, 1950/51–1956/57
- Brian Clayton, 1977/78
- Gihahn Cloete, 2015/16–2017/18
- Cecil Closenberg, 1936/37–1937/38
- Maurice Cole, 1921/22–1925/26
- E Collier, 1920/21 (Note: Collier played in one first–class match for Eastern Province in the 1920/21 season. No biographical details are known.)
- Norman Colling, 1993/94
- Ronald Colling, 1966/67–1973/74
- Michael Collins, 1979/80
- Cecil Colman, 1912/13
- Benjamin Connell, 1934/35 (Note: Collier played in one first–class match for Eastern Province in the 1934/35 season. No biographical details are known.)
- Raymond Connell, 1945/46–1952/53
- James Connerty, 1920/21
- Frederick Cook, 1893/94–1904/05
- Geoff Cook, 1978/79–1980/81
- Peter Copeland, 1956/57–1962/63
- Walter Copeland, 1890/91–1891/92
- Patrick Cornell, 1957/58–1960/61
- Michael Court, 1964/65–1966/67
- Shelsley Court, 1893/94
- Gavin Cowley, 1970/71–1984/85
- Arthur Coy, 1934/35–1947/48
- Ernest Crage, 1891/92–1893/94
- Thomas Crage, 1903/04–1921/22
- Edmund Crankshaw, 1979/80
- Murray Creed, 1992/93–2001/02
- Vernon Cresswell, 1980/81–1983/84
- Basil Crews, 1958/59
- Douglas Crooks, 1902/03
- Heath Crouch, 1912/13–1920/21
- Clive Cruickshanks, 1931/32–1934/35
- Grahame Cruickshanks, 1931/32
- Alwyn Curnick, 1949/50–1950/51

== D ==
- Grant Dakin, 1985/86
- Geoff Dakin, 1952/53–1962/63
- David Daly, 1896/97–1902/03
- Dennis Daly, 1933/34–1935/36
- Ian Daniell, 1977/78–1986/87
- Donald Davidson, 1933/34
- Eric Davies, 1929/30–1935/36
- Marchant Davies, 1921/22–1926/27
- Laurence Davis, 1950/51
- Hubert Davison, 1925/26–1929/30
- Junaid Dawood, 2016/17
- Thomas Dean, 1956/57
- Quinton de Bruin, 1994/95–1995/96
- Jade de Klerk, 2011/12–2019/20
- Charles Delbridge, 1910/11–1912/13
- Gordon Den, 1964/65–1969/70
- Jason de Reuck, 1998/99
- Brian Desfountain, 1977/78–1978/79
- JS de Villiers, 1890/91 (Note: de Villiers played in one first–class match for Eastern Province in the 1934/35 season. No biographical details are known.)
- Desmond Dimbleby, 1936/37–1949/50
- Kenneth Dimbleby, 1933/34–1952/53
- Lazola Dipha, 1998/99–2005/06
- Douglas Dold, 1922/23–1924/25
- Brian Dold, 1956/57–1958/59
- John Dold, 1925/26–1926/27
- Brad Dolley, 2005/06–2017/18
- Corbyn Dolley, 2005/06–2011/12
- Gary Dolley, 1988/89 (Note: Dolley, whose brother Richard also played for the team, played in one first-class match in 1988/89.)
- Josh Dolley, 2004/05–2011/12
- Richard Dolley, 1982/83–1990/91
- Harold Donachie, 1989/90–1990/91
- Herbert Dorrington, 1908/09–1912/13
- Adriano dos Santos, 2007/08–2008/09
- Robert Dower, 1896/97–1906/07
- Errol Draper, 1950/51–1951/52
- Ronald Draper, 1945/46–1949/50
- Irvine Drimmie, 1939/40
- Kevin Duckworth, 1999/00–2001/02
- Herbert Dugmore, 1929/30
- John Dugmore, 1974/75
- Jon Dumbrill, 1962/63–1965/66
- Henry Dunell, 1909/10
- Clint du Plessis, 1994/95–2001/02
- Petrus du Plessis, 1988/89–1992/93
- Sydney du Toit, 1948/49–1955/56
- Nigel Dutton, 1967/68–1973/74
- John Dye, 1972/73
- Athenkosi Dyili, 2006/07–2013/14

== E ==
- Phil Edmonds, 1975/76
- J Edwards, 1902/03 (Note: Edwards played in two first–class matches for Eastern Province in the 1902/03 season. No biographical details are known.)
- Errol Eichstadt, 1968/69
- Dickey Elliott, 1976/77–1979/80
- Willie Els, 1978/79
- David Emslie, 1979/80–1987/88
- Howard Emslie, 1946/47–1956/57

== F ==
- Herbert Feltham, 1945/46–1951/52
- Peter Fenix, 1965/66–1971/72
- Russell Fensham, 1979/80–1983/84
- Stephen Fensham, 1998/99–2005/06
- Wayne Fensham, 1981/82
- David Fernley, 1954/55
- David Ferrant, 1983/84–1990/91
- John Ferrant, 1956/57–1970/71
- Aubrey Ferreira, 2014/15–2017/18
- Neville Ferreira, 1933/34–1938/39
- Quentin Ferreira, 1996/97–1997/98
- Alan Finlayson, 1921/22
- Charles Finlayson, 1925/26–1931/32
- Robert Flack, 1945/46
- Shaun Flegg, 1993/94
- Kenneth Fleming, 1935/36
- Oswald Flemmer, 1929/30
- Burton Forbes, 1991/92–1994/95
- Mark Ford, 1985/86
- Clyde Fortuin, 2015/16–2018/19
- Ramsey Forword, 1952/53–1956/57
- Edward Fouche, 1960/61
- Ivor Foulkes, 1979/80–1981/82
- John Fox, 1961/62
- Thomas Francis, 1927/28
- Jeffrey Frans, 1976/77
- Gavin Fraser, 1977/78–1980/81
- John Fraser, 1920/21 (Note: Fraser played in one first–class match for Eastern Province in the 1920/21 season. No biographical details are known.)
- Hubert Freakes, 1931/32–1933/34
- Bruce Friderichs, 2000/01–2004/05
- Vivian Furmidge, 1926/27–1929/30
- James Furstenburg, 1979/80–1987/88
- Peter Furstenburg, 2000/01–2012/13
- Warrick Fynn, 2006/07–2009/10

== G ==
- Ashton Galpin, 1971/72–1978/79
- John Galpin, 1935/36
- Murray Gardner, 1931/32–1934/35
- Hilary Gardner, 1939/40
- Roy Gathorne, 1952/53
- I Gedye, 1992/93–1993/94 (Note: Gedye played in one List A match for Eastern Province in the 1993/94 season. No biographical details are known.)
- Jack Gentry, 1927/28
- Siviwe Gidana, 2008/09–2019/20
- Lennox Giddy, 1888/89–1903/04
- Lionel Gill, 1896/97 (Note: Gill played in one first–class match for Eastern Province in the 1896/97 season. No biographical details are known.)
- Charles Gingell, 1920/21–1926/27
- Joseph Giri, 1910/11 (Note: Giri played in six first–class matches for Eastern Province in the 1910/11 season. No biographical details are known.)
- John Gleeson, 1974/75
- Martin Gleeson, 1893/94–1896/97
- Robert Gleeson, 1891/92–1904/05
- William Glisson, 1906/07–1922/23
- Christiaan Goetz, 1906/07
- Stephen Goldsmith, 1893/94
- John Gorton, 1938/39
- Robert Gouldie, 1939/40
- Dev Govindjee, 1977/78
- Graham Grace, 1993/94–2000/01
- Dudley Gradwell, 1964/65–1966/67
- Keith Gradwell, 1977/78–1981/82
- Glen Granger, 1951/52
- Ernest Greathead, 1925/26–1926/27
- Rowan Grebe, 1953/54–1957/58
- Claude Green, 1929/30
- Tony Greig, 1970/71–1971/72
- Albert Gubb, 1902/03 (Note: Gubb played in one first–class match for Eastern Province in the 1902/03 season. No biographical details are known.)
- Thomas Gubb, 1898/99–1902/03
- John Gush, 1956/57–1957/58

== H ==
- Glen Hall, 1961/62–1963/64
- Mark Handman, 1994/95
- Rupert Hanley, 1970/71–1974/75
- Reginald Hannam, 1905/06–1912/13
- Thomas Harding, 1909/10–1910/11
- William Hards, 1926/27–1927/28
- Simon Harmer, 2009/10–2011/12
- Michael Harris, 1971/72
- G Hartman, 1939/40 (Note: Hartman played in five first–class matches for Eastern Province in the 1939/40 season. No biographical details are known.)
- John Harty, 1956/57–1965/66
- Ronald Harvey, 1952/53–1953/54
- William Harvey, 1912/13 (Note: Harvey played in two first–class matches for Eastern Province in the 1912/13 season. No biographical details are known.)
- Jan Havenga, 1984/85
- Graham Hayward, 1998/99–2001/02
- Nantie Hayward, 1994/95–2003/04
- Eric Haywood, 1920/21–1921/22
- Arthur Hazell, 1902/03–1908/09
- John Heath, 1990/91–1994/95
- Alan Hector, 1965/66–1967/68
- Robert Henderson, 1933/34–1937/38
- Rani Hendricks, 1977/78
- Peter Heugh, 1890/91 (Note: Heugh played in three first–class matches for Eastern Province in the 1890/91 season. No biographical details are known.)
- Augustus Hewitt-Fox, 1905/06–1929/30
- Dudley Hibbert, 1937/38
- Harold Hibbert, 1902/03–1906/07
- Desmond Hicken, 1950/51
- Alfred Hicks, 1946/47–1956/57
- Frederick Hippert, 1902/03–1910/11
- Sid Hird, 1945/46-1948/49
- Wally Hitzeroth, 1952/53
- Anthony Hobson, 1983/84–1997/98
- Lloyd Hobson, 2009/10
- Denys Hobson, 1969/70–1970/71
- Mackie Hobson, 1989/90
- Norman Hobson, 1905/06
- Peter Holmes, 1937/38–1939/40
- Bob Homani, 1996/97–2004/05
- John Hopkins, 1981/82
- Nigel Hopley, 1981/82–1983/84
- John Hops, 1922/23
- William Hoskin, 1934/35–1939/40
- Nathaniel Howard, 2011/12
- David Howell, 1978/79–1984/85
- Grant Howell, 2004/05–2007/08
- Ian Howell, 1981/82–1983/84
- Adam Huckle, 1992/93–1995/96
- Herbert Hudson, 1893/94
- Charles Hutchings, 1985/86–1987/88

== I ==
- Laurence Impey, 1951/52–1955/56
- Colin Ingram, 2000/01–2008/09

== J ==
- Arno Jacobs, 2003/04–2012/13
- Davy Jacobs, 2014/15
- Peter Jamieson, 1955/56–1961/62
- Warren Jamieson, 1994/95–1995/96
- Riaan Jeggels, 1999/00–2010/11
- Kenneth Johnson, 1950/51–1953/54
- Neil Johnson, 1988/89–1991/92
- Peter Johnson, 1939/40
- D Jones, 1983/84 (Note: Jones played in one first–class match for Eastern Province in the 1983/84 season. No biographical details are known.)
- Gordon Jordaan, 1948/49
- Sidney Jordan, 1954/55
- DF Joubert, 1903/04 (Note: Joubert played in one first–class match for Eastern Province in the 1903/04 season. No biographical details are known.)
- Harold Joubert, 1925/26

== K ==
- Thomas Kaber, 2018/19–2019/20
- Trevor Karg, 1977/78–1979/80
- Graeme Katz, 1987/88
- Solly Katz, 1961/62
- Stuart Keevy, 1985/86–1986/87
- Collin Kelbrick, 1977/78–1980/81
- Henry Kelly, 1920/21
- Patrick Kelly, 1928/29
- Justin Kemp, 1996/97–2002/03
- Frederick Kendle, 1903/04–1904/05
- Matthew Kennedy, 2006/07–2010/11
- Deon Kilian, 1978/79
- Alwyn King, 1975/76–1977/78
- Keith Kirton, 1960/61–1963/64
- Basil Knight, 1939/40
- Hylton Knowles, 1958/59
- Tian Koekemoer, 2015/16–2019/20
- Louis Koen, 1991/92–1998/99
- Brent Kops, 1999/00–2010/11
- Garnett Kruger, 1997/98–2002/03
- Willem Kruger, 1963/64
- Akhona Kula, 2007/08–2019/20

== L ==
- Therald Lane, 1957/58–1958/59
- Sithembile Langa, 2019/20
- Herbert Langenberg, 1989/90
- Wayne Larkins, 1982/83–1983/84
- Albert Lawrance, 1908/09–1912/13
- Andrew Lawson, 1995/96
- Terence Lazard, 1990/91
- Allan Lee, 1977/78
- John Leibbrandt, 1939/40–1946/47
- Fred le Roux, 1910/11
- Jeffrey Levey, 1973/74
- James Liddle, 1945/46–1949/50
- William Ling, 1928/29
- Henry Londt, 1908/09–1910/11
- Bryan Lones, 1985/86–1989/90
- Grant Long, 1979/80–1988/89
- Harold Long, 1952/53–1960/61
- Sean Long, 1983/84
- Vernon Longworth, 1910/11–1912/13
- Gavin Loon, 1992/93
- J Loots, 1902/03–1906/07 (Note: Loots played in six first–class matches for Eastern Province from 1902/03 to 1906/07. No biographical details are known.)
- Alan Louw, 1955/56
- Johann Louw, 2003/04
- Geoff Love, 1996/97–2003/04
- Harry Lovemore, 1904/05
- Cecil Lowell, 1949/50–1950/51
- David Lumsden, 1903/04–1909/10
- Bill Lundie, 1908/09–1909/10
- Murray Luscombe, 2007/08
- Rowan Lyle, 1993/94
- Bernard Lynch, 1936/37–1947/48
- Aidan Lyons, 1902/03–1908/09

== M ==
- Sibley McAdam, 1965/66–1971/72
- William McAdam, 1970/71–1971/72
- Brian McAllister, 1953/54–1954/55
- Dennis McAllister, 1939/40
- Mike Macaulay, 1977/78–1978/79
- Frederick McCabe, 1929/30
- Rodney McCleland, 1978/79
- Rod McCurdy, 1986/87–1990/91
- Forbes McDonald, 1938/39
- Robin MacDonald, 1952/53
- Ken McEwan, 1972/73–1989/90
- Vivian Mackay, 1904/05
- Frank McKeating, 1888/89–1891/92 (Note: McKeating played in two first–class matches for Eastern Province in the 1890/91 season. No biographical details are known.)
- Atholl McKinnon, 1952/53–1962/63
- Gary McKinnon, 1983/84–1989/90
- Archibald McNaughton, 1934/35–1948/49
- Kenneth McRobert, 1925/26–1926/27
- Athi Mafazwe, 2018/19
- Dumisani Magala, 2006/07–2016/17
- Sisanda Magala, 2004/05–2017/18
- Sihle Magongoma, 2013/14-2019/20
- John Maguire, 1989/90–1990/91
- James Maguire, 1925/26–1928/29
- Mzwandile Mahuwa, 1991/92–1993/94
- Dumisa Makalima, 2002/03–2003/04
- Lizo Makhosi, 2012/13–2019/20
- Sithembile Makongolo, 2005/06
- David Mallett, 1992/93
- Neville Mallett, 1956/57–1969/70
- George Mandy, 1926/27
- Neal Mandy, 1980/81–1983/84
- Charles Mangold, 1896/97
- Tufty Mann, 1946/47–1950/51
- Marco Marais, 2019/20
- Peter Marais, 1973/74–1975/76
- Richard Marais, 1929/30
- Wilhelm Marais, 1931/32–1939/40
- Raymond Mardon, 1929/30–1931/32
- Colin Maritz, 1930/31–1933/34
- Lulama Masikazana, 1993/94–1998/99
- Sizwe Masondo, 2011/12
- David Masterson, 2011/12–2018/19
- Michael Matika, 2007/08–2008/09
- Brett Matthews, 1988/89–1989/90
- Arthur Melvill, 1891/92–1906/07 (Note: Melvill played in seven first–class matches for Eastern Province from 1891/92 to 1906/07. No biographical details are known.)
- Mark-Anthony Mey, 1984/85
- Vincent Mey, 1991/92
- A Meyer, 1893/94 (Note: Meyer played in two first–class matches for Eastern Province in the 1893/94. No biographical details are known.)
- Syd Meyer, 1990/91
- Lyall Meyer, 2001/02–2012/13
- Wollaston Meyer, 1891/92
- Johannes Michau, 1997/98
- Marcelle Michau, 1984/85–1993/94
- Ronald Michell, 1933/34
- David Millard, 1952/53–1953/54
- Gregory Miller, 1992/93–1995/96
- Wayne Miller, 1982/83-1983/84 (Note: Miller played in seven first–class matches for Eastern Province from 1982/83 to 1983/84. No biographical details are known.)
- Noel Mills, 1933/34
- Harold Minkley, 1935/36
- David Mitchell, 1957/58
- Ian Mitchell, 2003/04
- Sinethemba Mjekula, 2004/05–2007/08
- Darren Moffat, 1997/98–1998/99
- William Moolman, 1997/98–1998/99
- Edward Moore, 2006/07–2019/20
- Grant Morgan, 1991/92–1996/97
- Ezra Moseley, 1983/84–1984/85
- William Mundell, 1963/64
- Campbell Munro, 1921/22–1926/27
- Anton Murray, 1947/48–1955/56
- Wayne Murray, 1997/98–2001/02
- G Murray, 1906/07 (Note: Murray played in a single first–class match for Eastern Province in the 1906/07 season. No biographical details are known.)
- Andy Murtagh, 1973/74
- Robbie Muzzell, 1974/75

== N ==
- Henry Nash, 1951/52
- Sithembiso Ndwandwa, 2009/10–2015/16
- James Neave, 1962/63–1968/69
- Aldre Nel, 2007/08–2011/12
- Louis Nel, 1962/63–1965/66
- Ruan Nel, 2002/03–2005/06
- Aubrey Nell, 1983/84–1986/87
- Mfuneko Ngam, 1997/98–2007/08
- Lesiba Ngoepe, 2016/17–2019/20
- David Nicholas, 1925/26
- Michael Nienaber, 2001/02–2002/03
- Desmond Niland, 1934/35
- Mpilo Njoloza, 2007/08–2011/12
- Arthur Noble, 1946/47
- Anrich Nortje, 2008/09–2018/19
- Eric Norton, 1936/37–1955/56
- Mtabozuko Nqam, 2011/12–2020/21
- Solo Nqweni, 2008/09–2018/19
- Siyamtanda Ntshona, 2006/07–2009/10
- Onke Nyaku, 2012/13–2019/20

== O ==
- Ernest Oakley, 1903/04
- Arthur Ochse, 1921/22–1937/38
- John Ogilvie, 1979/80–1985/86
- Lionel Oram, 1929/30
- Ethan O'Reilly, 2004/05–2015/16
- Henry O'Reilly, 1925/26–1927/28

== P ==
- Hubert Pagden, 1924/25–1930/31
- Steve Palframan, 1990/91
- Gary Parker-Nance, 1985/86
- Dante Parkin, 1890/91–1896/97
- Leonard Parkin, 1891/92–1893/94
- Wayne Parnell, 2002/03–2010/11
- John Paterson, 1909/10
- Arthur Pattison, 1925/26–1928/29
- Errol Pearce, 1960/61
- Walter Pearce, 1937/38
- Michael Perrott, 1950/51–1955/56
- Thokozani Peter, 2017/18
- Andre Peters, 1991/92–1998/99
- Lyle Petersen, 2019/20
- Robin Peterson, 1994/95–2008/09
- Alfred Petty, 1910/11 (Note: Petty played in three first–class matches for Eastern Province in the 1910/11 season. No biographical details are known.)
- Bertie Philpot, 1926/27–1929/30
- Marcello Piedt, 2020/21
- Johnny Pieterse, 1984/85
- Horace Pittaway, 1968/69–1972/73
- Peter Pollock, 1957/58–1971/72
- Graeme Pollock, 1960/61–1977/78
- John Ponsonby, 1955/56
- Brett Pope, 1988/89
- Steven Pope, 1991/92–1994/95
- Arthur Porter, 1929/30
- Frank Porter, 1912/13–1926/27
- Ian Postman, 2003/04
- Etienne Potgieter, 2000/01–2005/06
- Ian Preston, 1947/48–1948/49
- John Preston, 1933/34
- James Price, 2004/05–2015/16
- Harry Price, 1936/37
- Michael Price, 1996/97–2016/17
- Ashwell Prince, 1995/96–1997/98
- Charles Prince, 1898/99–1903/04
- George Pringle, 1946/47–1953/54
- Meyrick Pringle, 1986/87–2001/02
- Woodrow Procter, 1938/39–1939/40
- Douglas Proudfoot, 1890/91

== R ==
- Lennox Randall, 1937/38–1938/39
- Paul Rayment, 1985/86–1993/94
- Keith Reid, 1969/70–1980/81
- Terance Reid, 1977/78–1989/90
- Lindsay Reid-Ross, 1981/82–1983/84
- Wilhelm Rein, 1933/34–1934/35
- Alastair Rennie, 1960/61–1962/63
- Oliver Reynolds, 1945/46–1947/48
- Clinton Rhodes, 1990/91–1992/93
- Harold Rhodes, 1909/10
- Dave Richardson, 1977/78–1997/98
- Reginald Richter, 1936/37
- Douglas Riemer, 1934/35–1947/48
- Roderic Ripley, 1928/29
- Dudley Rippon, 1949/50
- Frank Rippon, 1933/34
- Douglas Ritchie, 1903/04
- Neville Ritchie, 1976/77
- Anthony Roberts, 1985/86–1986/87
- HC Roberts, 1906/07 (Note: Roberts played in two first–class matches for Eastern Province in the 1906/07 season. No biographical details are known.)
- Luke Roberts, 1996/97–2004/05
- Brent Robey, 1979/80–1993/94
- Ronald Robson, 1933/34–1939/40
- Desmond Roe, 1945/46
- Garth Roe, 1993/94–1995/96
- Christiaan Roelofse, 1988/89–1990/91
- Malcolm Ronaldson, 1937/38
- Daniel Rossouw, 1993/94–1995/96
- R Rouse, 1939/40 (Note: Rouse played in three first–class matches for Eastern Province in the 1939/40 season. No biographical details are known.)
- Eric Rowan, 1945/46
- Arthur Rudman, 1968/69–1970/71
- Colin Rushmere, 1956/57–1965/66
- Mark Rushmere, 1982/83–1999/00
- Robert Russell, 1978/79

== S ==
- Curtis Samboer, 2009/10–2014/15
- Unathi Sandi, 2005/06
- Keith Sansom, 1983/84
- John Sapsford, 1952/53–1953/54
- Etienne Schmidt, 1970/71–1976/77
- Samuel Schmidt, 1967/68–1971/72
- Brett Schultz, 1989/90–1995/96
- Timothy Seaman, 1978/79–1981/82
- Malcolm Searle, 1978/79–1979/80
- Russell Searle, 1950/51
- Rudi Second, 2010/11–2019/20
- Dewald Senekal, 1998/99–2000/01
- Junaid September, 1993/94–1997/98
- Nelson Setimani, 2018/19–2020/21
- Richard Seymour, 1978/79
- Oswald Shapter, 1929/30–1936/37
- James Sharp, 1939/40
- Gareth Shaw, 1992/93–1995/96
- Neville Shaw, 1955/56
- Tim Shaw, 1980/81–1996/97
- Arthur Short, 1965/66–1974/75
- Jonathan Shutte, 1996/97–1998/99
- Ngazibini Sigwili, 2014/15–2016/17
- PW Simpson, 1904/05 (Note: Simpson played in a single first–class match for Eastern Province in the 1904/05 season. No biographical details are known.)
- Lutho Sipamla, 2011/12–2018/19
- Mpumelelo Slwana, 2001/02–2005/06
- Johann Smit, 2013/14
- Martinus Smit, 1978/79
- Albert Smith, 1908/09–1925/26
- Clarence Smith, 1934/35–1939/40
- Gus Smith, 1964/65
- H Smith, 1896/97 (Note: Smith played in a single first–class match for Eastern Province in the 1896/97 season. No biographical details are known.)
- Justin Smith, 1997/98–1998/99
- Kenan Smith, 2014/15–2019/20
- Michael Smith, 2006/07–2012/13
- JJ Smuts, 2001/02–2016/17
- Kelly Smuts, 2002/03–2019/20
- Eric Smythe, 1963/64
- Andre Snyman, 1985/86–1988/89
- Abongile Sodumo, 2006/07
- William Solomon, 1905/06
- Mtimkulu Sontundu, 1993/94–1996/97
- Ralph Southey, 1938/39–1939/40
- Reginald Stanton, 1921/22
- Frank Steers, 1927/28
- A Stein, 1931/32 (Note: Stein played in five first–class matches for Eastern Province in the 1931/32 season. No biographical details are known.)
- John Stephenson, 1972/73–1982/83
- Bruce Stigant, 1993/94–1996/97
- Athol Stirk, 1925/26
- Michael Stonier, 1991/92
- Peter Stopforth, 1936/37
- Pieter Strydom, 1987/88–1991/92
- Kyle Stuart, 2010/11
- Tristan Stubbs, 2015/16–2020/21
- Glenton Stuurman, 2018/19–2019/20
- John Summerton, 1973/74–1974/75
- Roy Sutcliffe, 1947/48

== T ==
- Alfred Taylor, 1912/13 (Note: Taylor played in four first–class matches for Eastern Province in the 1912/13 season. No biographical details are known.)
- Roy Taylor, 1969/70
- Werner Terblanche, 1994/95
- Kevin Tessendorf, 1980/81
- Murray Thalrose, 1974/75
- Dennis Thane, 1982/83
- Dudley Theophilus, 1926/27–1933/34
- Juan Theron, 1998/99–2014/15
- Derek Thomas, 1973/74
- Greg Thomas, 1987/88–1988/89
- Brett Thompson, 2003/04–2006/07
- Edwin Thorogood, 1910/11
- Steytler Thwaits, 1939/40–1948/49
- Daniel Thysse, 1946/47–1947/48
- Craig Thyssen, 1998/99–2003/04
- John Timm, 1977/78–1978/79
- Ernest Tonks, 1896/97
- Lonwabo Tsotsobe, 2004/05–2006/07
- Brett Tucker, 2003/04
- Pierre Tullis, 1984/85–1993/94
- Clive Tuohy, 1956/57
- Frank Turberville, 1890/91–1891/92
- Frederick Turner, 1931/32
- Charles Twigg, 1926/27–1930/31

== U ==
- Clive Ulyate, 1964/65–1965/66
- Geoffrey Upton, 1929/30–1945/46

== V ==
- Lionel Vaaltyn, 2009/10–2014/15
- Jaysukh Vaghmaria, 1972/73–1975/76
- Pite van Biljon, 2008/09–2010/11
- Johann van den Berg, 1925/26–1933/34
- JP van der Merwe, 1950/51 (Note: Born at Naauwpoort in Cape Province in 1922, van der Merwe played one match for the team, scoring 66 runs and failing to take a wicket. No other biographical details are known.)
- Peter van der Merwe, 1966/67–1968/69
- Barry van der Vyver, 1987/88–1991/92
- Mickey van der Westhuizen, 1936/37
- Melcan van Eck, 1983/84–1989/90
- Elgin van Heerden, 1990/91
- George van Heerden, 2023/24
- Joshua van Heerden, 2018/19–2020/21
- Nealan van Heerden, 2023/24
- John van Rensburg, 1961/62–1965/66
- Darryl van Vuuren, 1984/85
- Michael van Vuuren, 1978/79–1988/89
- Peter van Vuuren, 1986/87–1987/88
- Tiaan van Vuuren, 2018/19–2022/23
- George Varnals, 1955/56–1957/58
- Ross Veenstra, 1990/91–1993/94
- Martin Venter, 1988/89–1995/96
- Gavin Victor, 1990/91–1997/98
- Keenan Vieira, 2018/19–2019/20
- Vincent Viret, 2009/10–2010/11
- Ernie Vogler, 1905/06–1906/07
- Garreth von Hoesslin, 2007/08
- Henco Vorstman, 2016/17–2018/19

== W ==
- Clayton Wait, 1993/94–1995/96
- John Waite, 1948/49–1951/52
- Richard Waldek, 1945/46
- Richard Walker, 1957/58
- Wayne Walker, 1997/98
- Basheeru-Deen Walters
- Lee-Roy Walters, 2012/13–2014/15
- W Walters, 1913/14–1929/30 (Note: Walters played five matches for the team either team of World War I. He scored a total of 67 runs and took six wickets. No other biographical details are known.)
- Kenny Watson, 1976/77–1986/87
- Wilfred Wells, 1945/46–1946/47
- Kepler Wessels, 1986/87–1997/98
- Sidney Wewege, 1936/37–1937/38
- Andrew White, 1994/95
- Albert White, 1902/03–1905/06
- Egerton White, 1933/34
- David White, 2010/11–2017/18
- Stanley White, 1928/29–1933/34
- Sean Whitehead, 2023/24
- Tebbutt Whitehead, 1921/22–1924/25
- Thomas Whitlock, 1928/29–1931/32
- Robert Whyte, 1975/76–1983/84
- Malik Wicks, 1977/78
- Oscar Wigg, 1908/09–1909/10
- Andrew Wilkins, 1966/67
- Chris Wilkins, 1972/73–1977/78
- Darryl Willemse, 2004/05–2005/06
- Peter Willey, 1982/83–1984/85
- Peter Williams, 1982/83
- Reece Williams, 2009/10–2011/12
- Thoba Williams, 1973/74–1975/76
- Lorrie Wilmot, 1960/61–1979/80
- Norman Wilmot, 1957/58–1968/69
- Maurice Wilson, 1971/72–1975/76
- Wally Wilson, 1945/46–1960/61
- Bentley Wimble, 1890/91
- Wade Wingfield, 2002/03–2003/04
- John Winstanley, 1976/77–1980/81
- John Wise, 1925/26
- Ronald Wise, 1951/52–1964/65
- Barry Wood, 1971/72–1973/74
- Michael Woodin, 1963/64–1966/67
- Bobby Woods, 1924/25
- Clive Wulfsohn, 1978/79–1987/88

== Y ==
- Phumzile Yiba, 2012/13–2014/15
- James Young, 1935/36–1952/53

== Z ==
- Monde Zondeki, 2011/12
