= List of North West representative cricketers =

This is a partial list of cricketers who have played first-class, List A cricket, or Twenty20 cricket for Western Transvaal and North West in South Africa. The team was renamed ahead of the 1996–97 season following the creation of North West province in 1994. (Note: The area covered by North West province was previously in Transvaal and Cape Provinces.)

Western Transvaal made its senior debut in the List A Nissan Cup competition during the 1989–90 season. After two seasons it began competing in the first-class UCB Bowl competition, the second division of the Currie Cup. After being renamed, the team continued to compete at first-class and List A level. North West first played domestic Twenty20 cricket in 2011–12, the first season in which provincial Twenty20 competitions were played in South Africa.

This list includes the players who played first-class and List A cricket for Western Transvaal between 1989–90 and 1995–96, and those who played first-class, List A, and Twenty20 cricket for North West from 1996–97 to the present day. It does not include players who appeared only for franchise team Lions which was operated by the North West and Gauteng Cricket Unions between 2003–04 and 2020–21. (Note: These players who played for the franchise team are listed at List of Lions (South Africa) cricketers.)

== A ==
- Warwick Abrahim
- Marques Ackerman
- Glen Adams
- Andrea Agathangelou
- Jesse Albanie
- Craig Alexander

== B ==
- Ryan Bailey
- Brady Barends
- Eben Botha
- Niel Bredenkamp
- Christopher Britz

== C ==
- Grant Celliers
- Yassar Cook
- Khanya Cotani
- Kevin Crowie

== D ==
- Shane Dadswell
- Bantu Dandala
- Colin Dettmer
- Burton de Wett
- Isaac Dikgale
- Johannes Diseko
- Jan Dreyer
- Clint du Plessis

== E ==
- Armand Erasmus

== F ==
- Bjorn Fortuin
- Richardt Frenz
- Peter Furstenburg

== G ==
- Graham Grace

== H ==
- Francois Haasbroek
- Ruan Haasbroek
- James Henderson
- Rubin Hermann
- Jon Hinrichsen

== J ==
- Arno Jacobs
- Davy Jacobs
- Duan Jansen
- Marco Jansen
- Henro Janse van Rensburg

== K ==
- Imraan Khan
- Dieter Klein

== L ==
- Mark Lavine
- Andrew Lawson
- Katleho Leokaoke
- Darryl le Roux
- Jean-Pierre le Roux
- Eden Links
- Edrich Lubbe
- Wihan Lubbe
- Bradley Lynch

== M ==
- Andre Malan
- Janneman Malan
- Grant Martin
- Dyllan Matthews
- Vusumuzi Mazibuko
- Hlompo Modimokwane
- Chris Morris
- Jordan Morris
- Senuran Muthusamy
- Ayavuya Myoli

== N ==
- Ian Nicolson

== O ==
- Hanco Olivier
- Gary Outram

== P ==
- Aaron Phangiso
- Heinrigh Pieterse
- Nono Pongolo
- Delano Potgieter
- Dwaine Pretorius
- Migael Pretorius
- Meeka-eel Prince
- David Pryke

== R ==
- Glen Radford
- Kagiso Rapulana
- Rayyaan Rhode
- Garth Roe
- Marc Rosenberg
- Daniel Rossouw

== S ==
- Caleb Seleka
- Phillimon Selowa
- Lesego Senokwane
- Mafinki Serame
- Tshepo Seroalo
- Malusi Siboto
- Ronald Siwani
- Nicholas Smit
- Haydn Smith
- Julian Soutter
- Hendy Springer
- Louren Steenkamp

== T ==
- Alfonso Thomas

== V ==
- Nicky van den Bergh
- Rassie van der Dussen
- Jovuan van Wyngaardt
- Louis Vorster
