= Netherlands cricket team in South Africa in 1996–97 =

Netherlands national cricket team tour

The Netherlands national cricket team toured South Africa from January to February 1997 and played seven limited overs matches against teams representing various areas of South Africa. The touring Dutch team was captained by Tim de Leede.

== Matches ==
23 January 1997
Scorecard

Combined Services; 149 (47 overs)	v	Netherlands; 150 (47.5 overs)
Pieter Koen 45; Asim Khan 4/20 (10 overs)		Bastiaan Zuiderent 52; Wessie Westraadt 3/21 (10 overs)

Netherlands won by 3 wickets
Langa Cricket Club Ground, Cape Town
Umpires: Muhammad Bagus and R. Pilowsky

- Combined Services won the toss and decided to bat

24 January 1997
Scorecard

Western Province; 244/8 (50 overs)	v	Netherlands; 71 (25.4 overs)
Dave Rundle 77; Godfrey Edwards 3/34 (9 overs)		Andre van Troost 17*; Dean Payne 5/23 (7 overs)

Western Province won by 173 runs
Newlands, Cape Town

- Toss not known

27 January 1997
Scorecard

Eastern Province; 204 (46 overs)	v	Netherlands; 129 (41.5 overs)
Grant Morgan 33; Andre van Troost 3/40 (9 overs)		Robert van Oosterom 71*; Kepler Wessels 2/18 (6 overs)

Eastern Province won by 75 runs
St George's Park, Port Elizabeth
Umpires: David Boyd and Ramesh Shah

- Eastern Province won the toss and decided to bat

29 January 1997
Scorecard

Netherlands; 223/8 (50 overs)	v	Border A 226/1 (43.5 overs)
Robert van Oosterom 87; Ian Howell 2/23 (8 overs)		Petrus Bouwer du Plessis 116*; Asim Khan 1/44 (10 overs)

Border A won by 9 wickets
Buffalo Park, East London
Umpires: Clive Cardinal, Peter Haxton and Robert Noble

- Netherlands won the toss and decided to bat

31 January 1997
[ Scorecard]

North West; 246/9 (50 overs)	v	Netherlands; 216 (50 overs)
Martin Venter 129; Marc Nota 3/33 (8 overs)		Tim de Leede 60; Jan Dreyer 4/39 (10 overs)

North West won by 30 runs
Gert Van Rensburg Stadium, Fochville

- Toss not known

2 February 1997
Scorecard

Netherlands; 231/9 (50 overs)	v	Transvaal Invitation XI; 232/5 (43.2 overs)
Bastiaan Zuiderent 63; Rowan Lyle 5/27 (10 overs)		Ken Rutherford 101; Zulfiqar Ahmed 3/37 (6 overs)

Transvaal Invitation XI won by 5 wickets
New Wanderers Stadium, Johannesburg
Umpires: Kevin Lavery and Shaid Wadvalla

- Netherlands won the toss and decided to bat

4 February 1997
Scorecard

Easterns; 239/9 (50 overs)	v	Netherlands; 208 (48.5 overs)
Craig Norris 42; Peter Cantrell 2/32 (10 overs)		Bastiaan Zuiderent 68; Syd Meyer 3/28 (9 overs)

Easterns won by 31 runs
Willowmoore Park, Benoni
Umpires: Kevin Lavery and Robert Lee

- Easterns won the toss and decided to bat
