= Grey High School =

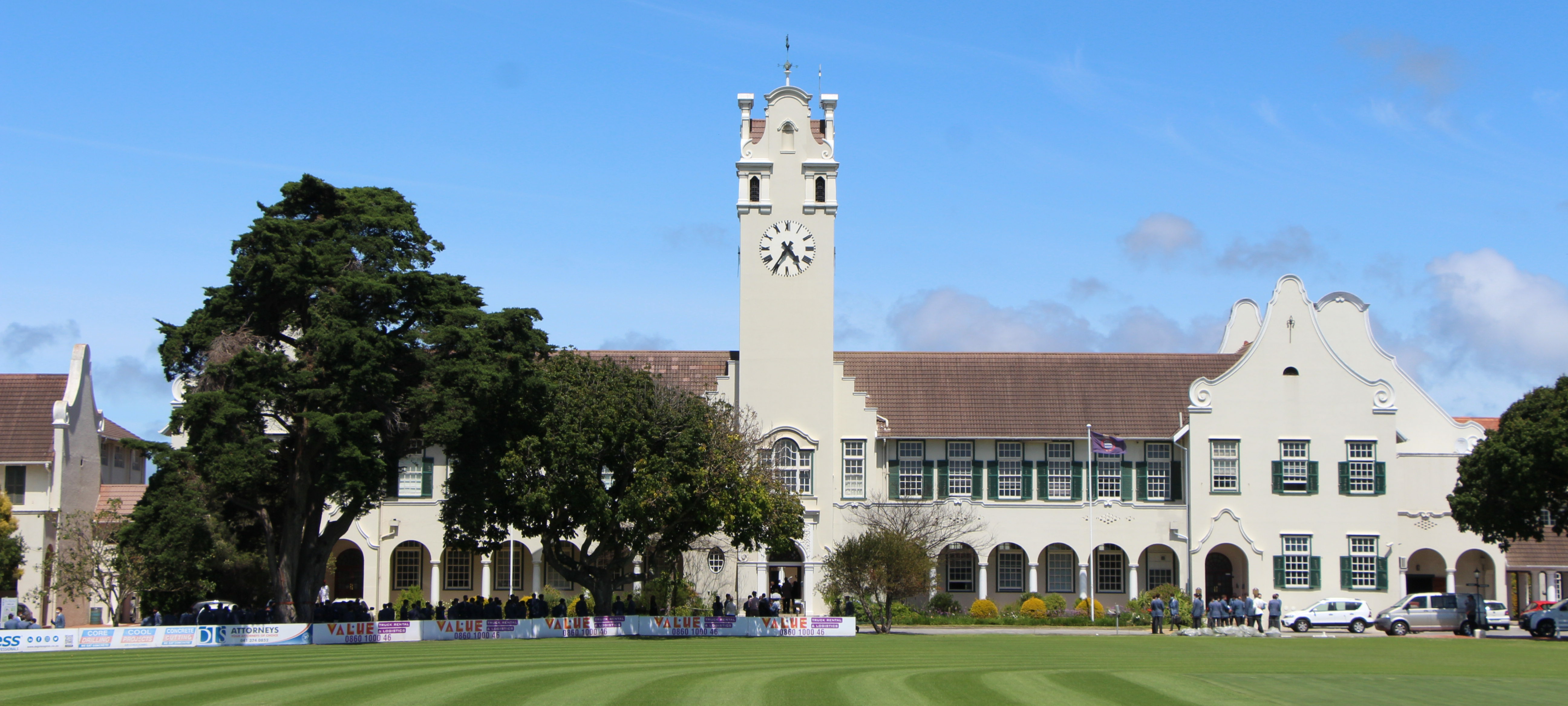
- Grey High School facade from College Drive

Location
- College Drive, Mill Park; Gqeberha, Eastern Cape; South Africa; 33°57′40″S 25°35′45″E

Information
- School type: All-boys public school
- Motto: Tria Juncta in Uno; "Three joined in one"; (Body, Mind, Spirit)
- Established: 4 June 1856; 170 years ago
- Founders: John Paterson; George Grey
- Sister school: Collegiate Girls High School
- Rector: Chris Erasmus (2018-present)
- Grades: 8 to 12
- Gender: Male
- Age: 14 to 18
- Enrollment: 870
- Language: English
- Schedule: Monday - Friday; 07:40 - 14:15
- Campus type: Suburban
- Colours: Blue; White
- Nickname: The Grey
- Rivals: Dale College; Graeme College; Grey College; Paul Roos Gymnasium; Queen's College; Selborne College; St. Andrew's College; Wynberg Boys' High School
- Publication: The Grey
- Newspaper: Grey Matter
- Tuition: R85,000 (boarding); R70,000 (tuition)
- Affiliation: Grey Junior School; The Grey Foundation; Old Greys' Union; Old Grey Club
- Alumni: Old Greys'
- Website: www.greyhighschool.com

Grey High School is a public English-medium high school (grades 8 to 12) for boys situated in the suburb of Mill Park in Gqeberha in the Eastern Cape province of South Africa. It is one of the top sporting schools in the country, with consistently strong academics and an extensive culture of musical performance, and is one of the oldest schools in South Africa.

== History ==
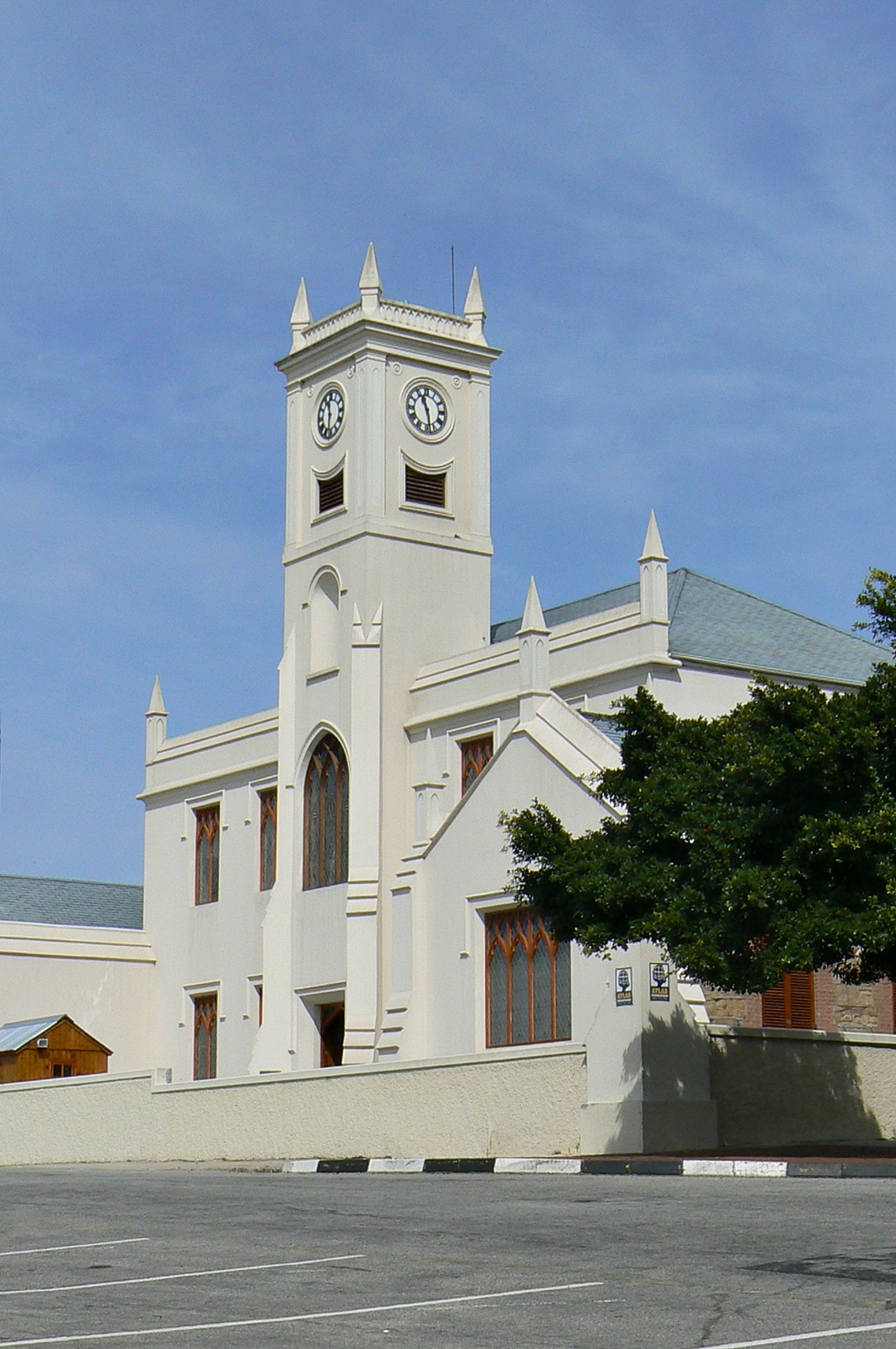
A recent photo of the original Grey Institute building opposite the Donkin Reserve on Belmont Terrace, Port Elizabeth

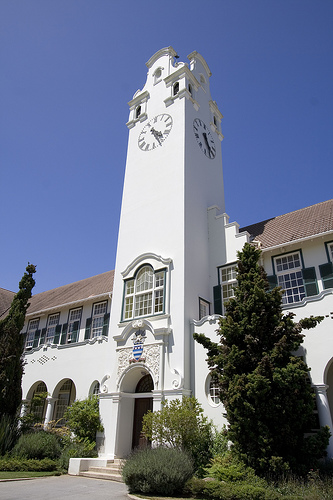
Grey High School main entrance on the current College Drive, Mill Park campus.

The school was founded as The Grey Institute by John Paterson, who also founded Standard Bank and The Herald newspaper, and named after Sir George Grey, Governor of the Cape Colony for the period 5 December 1854 – 15 August 1861, who was the benefactor for the original school to be constructed adjacent to the Donkin Reserve in Central, Port Elizabeth. The foundation stone was laid on 4 June 1856 and The Grey Institute officially opened for classes in 1859 with 40 students.

Sir George Grey, during his times as governor in South Africa, Australia and New Zealand is also affiliated with the establishment of other educational institutions such as Grey College in Bloemfontein, Auckland Grammar School in Auckland, New Zealand, and Whanganui Collegiate School, in Whanganui, New Zealand.

"The Grey" school song was written as the poem "The School on the Hill" by William Chubb Meredith, rector from 1892 to 1910. Due to significant growth from the "twice one hundred boys" referenced therein, the school relocated to College Drive, Mill Park in 1915 with the junior school taking over the former premises at the Donkin Reserve.

In the late 1920s, additional buildings were constructed to the south-east of the high school on the same campus and they were officially opened for use by the Grey Junior on 26 July 1930.

In 1931, references to "The Grey Institute" were dropped in favour of the schools being "Grey High School" headed by a rector, and "Grey Primary School" by a principal. The primary school would later adopt the reference "Grey Junior". Alumni still affectionately refer to the schools as "The Grey".

At approximately 870 students currently, the school is considered medium-sized in South African school terms, as is the norm for Eastern Cape boys schools. Competition outside of the Eastern Cape is typically against large-sized schools having between 1000 and 1500 students.

The school motto of "Tria Juncta in Uno", Latin for "Three Joined in One" is derived from the Most Honourable Order of the Bath of which Sir George Grey was made Knight Commander in 1848. (Three past South African presidents have been made Honorary Knights of Order of the Bath.) While the motto likely originally referred to the Holy Trinity, it has been reinterpreted to refer to the body, mind and spirit that make up a scholar at Grey.

=== Traditions ===
Quad Races: Inspired by the film Chariots of Fire, which deals with the rivalry between two famous Olympic athletes, Grey High School had both the cloisters and the necessary clock tower to perform this, and thus created its own version of a "Quad Race", held annually.

Matric students (final-year students) participate in time trials and the two most athletic qualifiers are chosen to compete in the race. The two participants begin the race directly in front of the war memorial and race against each other as well as against the ten chimes which take approximately 20 seconds to ring. The record, achieved in 1991, stands to the name of past scholar and staff member, Greg Miller, with a time of 19.8 seconds. He is one of less than a handful who have beaten the clock.

Robert Selley Memorial Concert: Selley Concert was inaugurated in 1986 in conjunction with the Founder's Day celebrations. The Selley Concert recognises the contributions Robert Selley made to the school's music department. The event is hosted annually on the Wednesday coinciding with the Reunion Week in May.

The concert typically comprises The Grey Junior School Concert Band and String Orchestra, and from the high school, The Grey Voices (choir) The Grey String Orchestra and The Grey Orchestra. A Jazz Band of senior high school musicians also regularly performs. The Old Grey Band is included in the program every second year, and consists of Old Greys of any age with musical experience who wish to be part of the show.

At the 2025 reunion week, the Bergman Auditorium was officially opened with a concert to a full auditorium of 450 attendees including alumni and their families, and with the benefactors and alumni, Stanley and Leslie Bergman in attendance. The Selley Concert was held, for the first time at this venue, later in May 2025.

Trooping the Colour: This parade is performed by senior members of the Cadet Detachment. First performed in 1938, this includes cadets from grade 10 to 12 parading to a marching band with local South African military officials in attendance. The trooping is a significant part of Grey High School.

Reunion Week: The Old Greys' Union arranges a series of events and functions annually at the beginning of May. This is particularly well attended by Old Greys and the events include a golf day, reunion dinner, Selley memorial concert, Trooping the Colour, Old Grey Club nights, and a weekend sports derby against a traditional rival school.

Remembrance Day: Attended by local senior military personnel on the 11th of November annually and open to war veterans and members of the public who lost family in the First or Second World Wars. The Last Post is played by the lead trumpeter and there is an opportunity to lay wreaths at the war memorial in the Memorial Quad with a fly past of vintage military aircraft (typically including a Harvard T-6) courtesy of the Davidson family.

== Sports ==
Grey High School has long-standing annual derby days for both summer and winter sports with traditional rivals such as Dale College, Queens College, Grey College, Muir College, St Andrews College, Graeme College and Selborne College that stretch back to at least the 1960s, and have more recently established annual derbies with Paul Roos Gymnasium and Wynberg Boys' High.

The school offers a number of major sports including rugby, hockey, athletics, cricket, rowing, swimming, water polo, tennis, squash, air-rifle shooting, golf, basketball, mountain biking and cross-country with several provincial and national representatives at age-group level over the years, and many provincial and national representatives at senior levels of international competition.

Grey High School has a long history of producing cricketers of international standard and rivals King Edward School in Johannesburg and Bishops College for second place, after Durban High School, for the most South African representatives at senior level. It has also outright produced the most South African Schools cricketers of any school.

The Pollock Oval is the main cricket oval in front of the school, named in 1987 for alumnus Graeme Pollock, voted South Africa's Cricketer of the 20th Century.

The Kolisi Field is the main rugby field at the back of the school, renamed during the annual reunion week in May 2022, for alumnus Siya Kolisi, Captain of the Springboks during their victorious 2019 Rugby World Cup campaign.

The Grey Rugby Festival is hosted annually by the school and includes under-19 and age-group teams from various schools from around South Africa.

The Hibbert Shield hockey tournament was inaugurated in 2019 and hosts schools from all areas of South Africa. This shield is named for a family of alumni of the school who have been extensively involved in hockey for several decades as staff and coaches at the school, and as national representatives in the sport. The Hibbert Shield is awarded to U19 teams and the Hibbert Cup is awarded to U16 teams at the tournament.

The Hirsch Shield is an athletics meeting at which Grey High School competes annually with other Eastern Cape schools including Kingswood College, Queens College, Dale College, Graeme College, Muir College, St Andrews College, and Selborne College. Inaugurated in 1917, the competition for this prestigious shield is the oldest schools athletics event in South Africa.

Grey is the only school in Gqeberha to offer sweep-oar rowing as a sport. This sees the rowing crews travel to East London, Knysna, Port Alfred and Pretoria to compete in regattas with other rowing schools from around the country, with the culmination of the season being the South African Schools Championships in Pretoria. In 2014, two U16 boys were selected to represent South African Schools Rowing in Belgium and returned with gold and silver medals.

In 2020, SA School Sports magazine named Grey High School as the "Top Boys Sports School of the Decade" taking into account performances from across the sport codes of rugby, cricket, water polo and hockey.

== Notable alumni ==
=== Sports ===
==== Cricket ====
- Colin Ackermann, Dutch-South African cricketer
- Neil Adcock, South African cricketer
- Johan Botha, South African cricketer, T20 and ODI captain
- William Brann, South African cricketer
- Matthew Breetzke, South African cricketer
- David Callaghan, South African cricketer
- Geoff Chubb, South African cricketer
- Robert Dower, South African cricketer
- Ron Draper, South African cricketer
- Aubrey Faulkner, South African cricketer inducted into the ICC Cricket Hall of Fame
- Robert Gleeson, South African cricketer
- Rupert Hanley, South African cricketer
- Ian Howell, International cricket umpire
- Atholl Henry McKinnon, South African cricketer
- David Nosworthy, South African cricketer and coach of the Titans, Highveld Lions and Canterbury Wizards
- Dante Parkin, South African cricketer
- Wayne Parnell, South African cricketer, Warriors cricket player and South African U19 Cricket Captain
- Graeme Pollock, South African cricketer inducted into the ICC Cricket Hall of Fame
- Peter Pollock, South African cricketer
- Lutho Sipamla, South African cricketer
- Pieter Strydom, South African cricketer
- Tristan Stubbs, South African cricketer
- Rusty Theron, South African and USA international cricketer

==== Rugby ====
- Curwin Bosch, Springbok, South Africa Under-20 and Sharks rugby player
- Mike Catt, England and British Lions rugby player, former assistant coach for England, Italy, and Ireland. Currently attack coach for NSW Waratahs.
- Gavin Cowley, Junior Springbok, Eastern Province rugby player and captain, rugby commentator for SuperSport television
- Roy Dryburgh, Springbok rugby player and captain
- Rory Duncan, Free State Cheetahs rugby player and captain, former Currie Cup head coach, and former coach of DoCoMo Red Hurricanes Osaka in Japan, current CEO of Freestate Cheetahs rugby union.
- JJ Engelbrecht, Blue Bulls and Springbok rugby player
- Steven Hunt, South African Rugby 7s player
- Ian Kirkpatrick, Springbok rugby player, Griquas coach and director of coaching for South African rugby
- Siya Kolisi, Sharks and double World-Cup-winning Springbok rugby captain
- Mpho Mbiyozo, South African Rugby 7s player
- Sergeal Petersen, South Africa Under-20 and Free State Cheetahs rugby player
- Junior Pokomela, South Africa Under-20, Free State Cheetahs and Stormers rugby player
- Bunny Reid, Springbok rugby player
- Jan Serfontein, Bulls and Springbok rugby player
- Fred Smollan, Springbok rugby player
- Alan Solomons, Springbok assistant coach to Nick Mallett, head coach at various teams in South Africa and the UK most notably, The Stormers, Ulster, The Barbarians, Edinburgh, and Director of Rugby at Worcester Warriors
- Freddy Turner, Springbok rugby player
- Michael van Vuuren, Bath Rugby, Leicester Tigers and former South Africa Under-20 rugby player
- Keanu Vers, South African schools national rugby team, South Africa under-20 and Eastern Province Kings player
- Jeremy Ward, South Africa Under-20, Sharks and Stade Français rugby player
- Luke Watson, Springbok rugby player, former Western Province, Stormers and Eastern Province Kings captain
- Tim Whitehead, Natal Sharks, Western Province, and Eastern Province Kings rugby player

==== Hockey ====
- Clyde Abrahams, South Africa hockey player, 2008 Summer Olympics
- Paul Blake, South Africa hockey player, 2008 Summer Olympics
- Kevin Chree, South Africa hockey player, 1996 Olympic games
- Russell Fensham, South Africa hockey player
- Wayne Fensham, South Africa hockey player
- Wayne Graham, South Africa hockey player, 1996 Olympic games
- Chris Hibbert, South Africa hockey player, 2004 Summer Olympics and the 2008 Summer Olympics
- Lindsay Reid-Ross, South Africa hockey player
- Dr Ian Symons, South Africa hockey player, 2004 Summer Olympics and the 2008 Summer Olympics

==== Athletics ====
- Jamie Riddle, South Africa tri-athlete, 2022 Commonwealth Games, 2024 Summer Olympics

==== Tennis ====
- Cliff Drysdale, 1972 US Open Tennis doubles champion as well as a number of other singles and doubles championships; represented South Africa in the Davis Cup

==== Swimming ====
- Kevin Paul gold medalist at the 2008 Summer Paralympics for men's 100m breaststroke SB9, breaking the world record at 17 years of age
- Christopher Reid, South African swimmer, 2016 Summer Olympics
- Peter Williams South African Olympic and Commonwealth Games swimmer who set a world record in the 50-metre freestyle

==== Water Polo ====
- Jason Evezard, South Africa Water Polo, 2020 Summer Olympics

==== Surfing ====
- Matthew McGillivray, South Africa Surfing, 2024 Summer Olympics

=== Arts and culture ===
- David Fanning, executive producer of the multiple award-winning Frontline, the longest running documentary investigative show in the United States
- Barry Smith, Organist Emeritus, St George's Cathedral, Cape Town; former associate professor, Faculty of Music, UCT
- Eric Lloyd Williams, journalist and war correspondent

=== Military ===
- Derek Christian, Commandant of the South African Military Academy, Chief of Joint Operations, South African Navy
- Robert Higgs, Flag Officer Fleet, Chief of Naval Staff, South African Navy

=== Politics ===
- David Maynier, South African parliamentarian for Democratic Alliance; Western Cape Provincial Minister of Education

=== Philanthropy ===
- Vincent Mai, South African-American businessman, financier, and philanthropist. Benefactor of the Grey Outreach Programme, the Grey Junior & Grey High bursary scheme.

=== Science ===
- Vivian Frederick Maynard FitzSimons, leading herpetologist and Director of the Transvaal Museum

== In the media ==
- The school was featured in the second episode of the Australian Seven Network's version of the TV show The World's Strictest Parents.
