= William McAdam =

William McAdam may refer to:

- William McAdam (British politician), member of parliament for Salford North
- William McAdam (Australian politician), member of the Victorian Legislative Assembly
- William McAdam (cricketer), South African cricketer
- William McAdam (merchant), Scottish-American merchant and businessman
