= Daniel Brown =

Daniel, Dan, or Danny Brown may refer to:

== Arts and entertainment ==
- Danny Joe Brown (1951–2005), American musician
- Dan Brown (born 1964), American author of thriller fiction, including The Da Vinci Code
- Danny Brown (born 1981), American hip hop recording artist
- Dan Brown (blogger) (born 1990), American internet blogger and YouTube celebrity
- Danny "GC" Brown, American contestant of Survivor: Gabon

== Law and politics ==
- Daniel Russell Brown (1848–1919), American politician, governor of Rhode Island
- Daniel Brown (politician) (born 1945), American politician in Tennessee
- Dan W. Brown (1950–2021), American politician in Missouri

== Sports ==
- Daniel Brown (cricketer) (1908–1972), South African cricketer
- Danny Brown (American football) (1925–1995), American football defensive end
- Danny Brown (footballer) (born 1980), English footballer
- Daniel Brown (rower) (born 1982), British pararower
- Dee Brown (basketball, born 1984) (Daniel Brown), American basketball player
- Daniel Brown (racing driver) (born 1991), British racing driver
- Daniel Brown (American football) (born 1992), American football player
- Dan Brown (golfer) (born 1994), English golfer

== Others ==
- Daniel McGillivray Brown (1923–2012), Scottish chemist
- Daniel James Brown (born 1951), American nonfiction writer
- Daniel K. Brown, New Zealand-based American architect
- Daniel W. Brown, Pakistani author of books on Islam

== See also ==
- Daniel Browne (born 1979), rugby union player from New Zealand
- Daniel Browne (Irish politician) (died 2010), Lord Mayor of Dublin 1982–1983
- Dan Browne (born 1974), American distance runner
- Dan Braun (born c. 1962), American musician
