= Andre Botha =

Andre Botha is the name of:

- Andre Botha (bodyboarder) (born 1980), South African bodyboarder
- Andre Botha (cricketer) (born 1975), Irish cricketer
- André Botha (born 1972), South African cricketer
