= John Dugmore =

John Dugmore may refer to:

- John Dugmore (cricketer), South African cricketer
- John Dugmore of Swaffham, British draughtsman and grand-tourist
