= Solly Katz =

South African cricketer and inventor

Personal information
- Born: 13 October 1942 (age 84); Port Elizabeth, South Africa
- Batting: Right-hand bat
- Role: Wicketkeeper

Domestic team information
- Years: Team
- Eastern Province
- Transvaal
- Source: Cricinfo, 16 March 2021

Solly Katz is a former South African cricketer and inventor. He played as a right-handed batter and wicketkeeper in first-class cricket, representing Eastern Province and Transvaal during the 1960s. He later emigrated to Israel, where he pursued a career as an inventor and contributed to various technological developments, including patents in solar energy and other fields.

== Early life and education ==
Solly Katz attended Grey High School in Port Elizabeth, South Africa, where he was a member of the school’s Old Greys’ Union as an alumnus.

== Cricket Career ==
Solly Katz was a right-handed batter and wicketkeeper who appeared in nine first-class matches during his career, representing Eastern Province and Transvaal between the 1961/62 and 1967/68 seasons. He is listed as a representative cricketer for Eastern Province for the 1961/62 season in the official list of Eastern Province representative players.

Katz appeared for Transvaal in a first-class match against the touring Australians at New Wanderers Stadium in Johannesburg in November 1966 during the 1966–67 Australia tour of South Africa. Transvaal won the four-day match by 76 runs.

Katz was also Transvaal’s wicketkeeper in the 1966–67 Currie Cup match against Rhodesia, taking the field in what was described as his first game for Transvaal in that competition.

During his first-class career, Katz’s contemporaries in South African representative cricket included players such as Graeme Pollock, Peter Pollock, Atholl McKinnon, Tiger Lance, Eddie Barlow, and Ali Bacher, as well as cricketers from international association cricket such as Jerrold Kessel.

According to the late Tom Dean, who coached cricket at Grey High School, Katz was "the best wicketkeeper that he had ever coached from here."

== Later Life and Inventions ==
In addition to his cricket career, Solly Katz is an inventor with multiple patents to his name. He is listed as an inventor on a patent for improvements to solar energy heating devices under French patent application FR2321097A1. Katz is also the inventor of a United States patent for a solar heater (US4128096A), which describes improvements in solar heating systems that adjust collector orientation and insulation to optimize performance.

Katz is additionally listed as the inventor on patents for beverage and fluid dispensers, including a beverage dispenser with an agitator, a fluid dispenser patented in the European Patent Office, and an Australian liquid dispenser patent.

== See also ==
- List of Eastern Province representative cricketers
