= William Catton =

William Catton may refer to:

- William Catton (cricketer) (1865–1939), South African cricketer
- William Catton (MP) for Winchelsea (UK Parliament constituency)
- William R. Catton Jr. (1926–2015), American environmental sociologist and human ecologist
- William H. Catton (fl. 1890–1920), American professional carom billiards player
