= John Harty =

John Harty can refer to:

- John Harty (American football)
- John Harty (cricketer)
- John Harty (equestrian)
- John Harty (bishop)
- John P. Harty Sr., creator of The Cross (Barre, Massachusetts)
