= Ashton Galpin =

South African cricketer (born 1950)

Personal information
- Full name: Ashton Carter Galpin
- Born: 13 May 1950; Port Elizabeth, South Africa
- Died: 2 April 2022 (aged 71); Gqeberha, Eastern Cape, South Africa
- Batting: Right-handed
- Role: Wicket-keeper
- Relatives: John Galpin (father)

Domestic team information
- Years: Team
- 1971/72–1978/79: Eastern Province
- Source: Cricinfo, 17 December 2020

Ashton Carter Galpin (13 May 1950 – 2 April 2022) was a South African cricketer. He played in nineteen first-class and seven List A matches for Eastern Province from 1971/72 to 1978/79.

== See also ==
- List of Eastern Province representative cricketers
