= Martin Gleeson =

Martin Gleeson may refer to:

- Martin Gleeson (rugby league) (born 1980), English rugby league player
- Martin Gleeson (Australian footballer) (born 1994), Australian rules footballer
- Martin Gleeson (cricketer) (1875–1918), South African cricketer
