= Trevor Karg =

South African cricketer (born 1951)

Personal information
- Born: 10 October 1951 (age 75); Cradock, South Africa
- Source: Cricinfo, 16 March 2021

Trevor Karg (born 10 October 1951) is a South African former cricketer. He played in seven first-class matches for Eastern Province between 1977/78 and 1979/80.

== See also ==
- List of Eastern Province representative cricketers
