= Sithembiso Ndwandwa =

South African cricketer (born 1989)

Personal information
- Born: 10 November 1989 (age 37); Port Elizabeth, South Africa
- Source: Cricinfo, 24 March 2021

Sithembiso Ndwandwa (born 10 November 1989) is a South African cricketer. He played in eighteen first-class, twelve List A, and six Twenty20 matches between 2013 and 2016.

== See also ==
- List of Eastern Province representative cricketers
