= Matthew Kennedy (cricketer) =

South African cricketer (born 1991)

Personal information
- Born: 6 March 1991 (age 35); Port Elizabeth, South Africa
- Source: Cricinfo, 16 March 2021

Matthew Kennedy (born 6 March 1991) is a South African cricketer. He played in five first-class and six List A matches for Eastern Province between 2009 and 2011.

== See also ==
- List of Eastern Province representative cricketers
