= Lazola Dipha =

South African cricketer (born 1982)

Personal information
- Born: 17 October 1982 (age 44); Port Elizabeth, South Africa
- Batting: Right handed
- Bowling: Right-arm Fast Medium
- Source: , 17 December 2020

Lazola Dipha (born 17 October 1982) is a South African cricketer. He played in five first-class and five List A matches for Eastern Province from 2001 to 2006.

== See also ==
- List of Eastern Province representative cricketers
