= Shaun Flegg =

South African cricketer (born 1968)

Personal information
- Born: 14 November 1968 (age 57); Uitenhage, South Africa
- Source: Cricinfo, 17 December 2020

Shaun Flegg (born 14 November 1968) is a South African former cricketer. He played in one first-class match for Eastern Province in 1993/94.

== See also ==
- List of Eastern Province representative cricketers
