= David Ferrant =

South African cricketer (born 1963)

Personal information
- Born: 24 March 1963 (age 63); Port Elizabeth, South Africa
- Source: Cricinfo, 17 December 2020

David Ferrant (born 24 March 1963) is a South African cricketer. He played in 31 first-class matches for Eastern Province from 1983/84 to 1990/91.

== See also ==
- List of Eastern Province representative cricketers
