= John Gush =

South African cricketer (1935–2014)

Personal information
- Born: 2 July 1935; Grahamstown, South Africa
- Died: 8 March 2014 (aged 78); Grahamstown, South Africa
- Source: Cricinfo, 17 December 2020

John Gush (2 July 1935 – 8 March 2014) was a South African cricketer. He played in four first-class matches for Eastern Province in 1956/57 and 1957/58.

== See also ==
- List of Eastern Province representative cricketers
