= Thomas Crage =

South African cricketer (1879–1945)

Personal information
- Born: 19 November 1879; Port Elizabeth, Cape Colony
- Died: 13 October 1945 (aged 65); Port Elizabeth, South Africa
- Source: Cricinfo, 17 December 2020

Thomas Crage (19 November 1879 – 13 October 1945) was a South African cricketer. He played in four first-class matches for Eastern Province from 1903/04 to 1921/22.

== See also ==
- List of Eastern Province representative cricketers
