= Riaan Jeggels =

South African cricketer (born 1981)

Personal information
- Born: 10 September 1981 (age 45); Port Elizabeth, South Africa
- Source: Cricinfo, 16 March 2021

Riaan Jeggels (born 10 September 1981) is a South African cricketer. He played in 40 first-class and 55 List A matches for Eastern Province between 2004 and 2011.

== See also ==
- List of Eastern Province representative cricketers
