= Frederick Hippert =

South African cricketer (1878–1940)

Personal information
- Born: 4 October 1878; Port Elizabeth, Cape Colony
- Died: 29 June 1940 (aged 61); Port Elizabeth, South Africa
- Source: Cricinfo, 16 March 2021

Frederick Hippert (4 October 1878 – 29 June 1940) was a South African cricketer. He played in seventeen first-class matches for Eastern Province between 1902/03 and 1910/11.

== See also ==
- List of Eastern Province representative cricketers
