= Pierre Tullis =

South African cricketer (born 1964)

Personal information
- Born: 8 November 1964 (age 62); Johannesburg, South Africa
- Source: Cricinfo, 30 March 2021

Pierre Tullis (born 8 November 1964) is a South African cricketer. He played in 44 first-class and 7 List A matches between 1984/85 and 1993/94.

== See also ==
- List of Eastern Province representative cricketers
