= Louis Nel =

South African cricketer (born 1941)

Personal information
- Full name: Louis Jacobus Nel
- Born: 2 February 1941; Somerset East, South Africa
- Died: 8 September 2016 (aged 75)
- Batting: Right-handed
- Bowling: Right-arm off-break

Domestic team information
- Years: Team
- 1963/64–1965/66: Eastern Province
- Source: Cricinfo, 16 March 2021

Louis Jacobus Nel (2 February 1941 – 8 September 2016) was a South African cricketer. He played in twelve first-class matches for Eastern Province between 1963/64 and 1965/66.

== See also ==
- List of Eastern Province representative cricketers
