= Grant Howell =

South African cricketer (born 1984)

Personal information
- Born: 10 April 1984 (age 42); Port Elizabeth, South Africa
- Source: Cricinfo, 16 March 2021

Grant Howell (born 10 February 1984) is a South African cricketer. He played in ten first-class and fifteen List A matches for Eastern Province between 2004 and 2008.

== See also ==
- List of Eastern Province representative cricketers
