= Michael Collins (cricketer) =

South African cricketer (born 1958)

Personal information
- Born: 6 December 1958 (age 67); Pretoria, South Africa
- Source: Cricinfo, 17 December 2020

Michael Collins (born 6 December 1958) is a South African cricketer. He played in five first-class matches for Eastern Province in 1979/80.

== See also ==
- List of Eastern Province representative cricketers
