= Herbert Dugmore =

South African cricketer

Personal information
- Born: 4 August 1909; Bulawayo, Rhodesia
- Died: 27 October 1974 (aged 65); Bulawayo, Rhodesia
- Source: Cricinfo, 17 December 2020

Herbert Balfour John Dugmore, CBE (4 August 1909 – 27 October 1974) was a Rhodesian and South African cricketer, civil servant, and businessman.

He played in one first-class match for Eastern Province in 1929/30.

== See also ==
- List of Eastern Province representative cricketers
