= Ian Anderson (South African cricketer) =

South African cricketer (born 1935)

Personal information
- Born: 7 August 1935 (age 91); Port Elizabeth, South Africa
- Source: Cricinfo, 17 December 2020

Ian Anderson (born 7 August 1935) is a South African cricketer. He played in twenty-one first-class matches for Eastern Province from 1955/56 to 1958/59.

== See also ==
- List of Eastern Province representative cricketers
