= Wayne Murray =

South African cricketer (born 1977)

Personal information
- Born: 29 July 1977 (age 49); Graaff-Reinet, South Africa
- Source: Cricinfo, 16 March 2021

Wayne Murray (born 29 July 1977) is a South African former cricketer. He played in 32 first-class and 34 List A matches for Eastern Province between 1997/98 and 2001/02.

== See also ==
- List of Eastern Province representative cricketers
