= Kenneth Fleming (cricketer) =

South African cricketer

Personal information
- Born: 26 August 1909; Gwelo, Rhodesia
- Died: 14 April 1996 (aged 86); Grahamstown, South Africa
- Source: Cricinfo, 17 December 2020

Kenneth Mackenzie 'Coney' Fleming (26 August 1909 – 14 April 1996) was a South African cricketer and Rhodesian and Zimbabwean politician. He played in one first-class match for Eastern Province in 1935/36.

He was later a member of the Senate of Zimbabwe.

== See also ==
- List of Eastern Province representative cricketers
