= Andrew Butters =

South African cricketer (born 1965)

Personal information
- Born: 15 April 1965 (age 61); Port Elizabeth, South Africa
- Source: Cricinfo, 17 December 2020

Andrew Butters (born 15 April 1965) is a South African cricketer. He played in six first-class matches for Eastern Province in 1984/85 and 1985/86.

== See also ==
- List of Eastern Province representative cricketers
