= Gregory Miller (cricketer) =

South African cricketer (born 1973)

Personal information
- Born: 7 May 1973 (age 53); Port Elizabeth, South Africa
- Source: Cricinfo, 16 March 2021

Gregory Miller (born 7 May 1973) is a South African cricketer. He played in fourteen first-class and eight List A matches for Eastern Province between 1993/94 and 1995/96.

== See also ==
- List of Eastern Province representative cricketers
