= Dennis Broad =

South African cricketer (born 1956)

Personal information
- Born: 19 October 1956 (age 70); Johannesburg, South Africa
- Source: Cricinfo, 17 December 2020

Dennis Broad (born 19 October 1956) is a South African cricketer. He played in three first-class matches for Eastern Province in 1981/82.

== See also ==
- List of Eastern Province representative cricketers
