= Hilary Gardner (cricketer) =

South African cricketer (1922–2012)

Personal information
- Born: 19 April 1922; Grahamstown, South Africa
- Died: 11 August 2012 (aged 90); Sandton, South Africa
- Source: Cricinfo, 17 December 2020

Hilary Gardner (19 April 1922 – 11 August 2012) was a South African cricketer. He played in two first-class matches for Eastern Province in 1939/40.

== See also ==
- List of Eastern Province representative cricketers
