= Maxwell Bolus =

South African cricketer (1890–1956)

Personal information
- Born: 26 June 1890; Cape Town, Cape Colony
- Died: 19 January 1956 (aged 65); Cape Town, South Africa
- Source: Cricinfo, 17 December 2020

Maxwell Bolus (26 June 1890 – 19 January 1956) was a South African cricketer. He played in three first-class matches for Eastern Province in 1924/25 and 1925/26.

== See also ==
- List of Eastern Province representative cricketers
