= Mark Handman =

South African cricketer (born 1971)

Personal information
- Born: 26 May 1971 (age 55); Greytown, South Africa
- Source: Cricinfo, 16 March 2021

Mark Handman (born 26 May 1971) is a South African cricketer. He played in sixteen first-class and nine List A matches between 1991 and 1995.

== See also ==
- List of Eastern Province representative cricketers
