= Nigel Dutton =

South African cricketer (born 1951)

Personal information
- Born: 27 July 1951 (age 75)
- Source: Cricinfo, 17 December 2020

Nigel Dutton (born 27 July 1951) is a South African cricketer. He played in one List A match for Eastern Province in 1973/74.

== See also ==
- List of Eastern Province representative cricketers
