= Brian Blenkinsop =

South African cricketer (1931–2017)

Personal information
- Born: 7 September 1931; Port Elizabeth, South Africa
- Died: 21 April 2017 (aged 85)
- Source: Cricinfo, 17 December 2020

Brian Blenkinsop (7 September 1931 – 21 April 2017) was a South African cricketer. He played in two first-class matches for Eastern Province in 1954/55.

== See also ==
- List of Eastern Province representative cricketers
