= David Butlion =

South African cricketer (1944–2005)

Personal information
- Born: 16 December 1944
- Died: 8 March 2005 (aged 60); Durbanville, South Africa
- Source: Cricinfo, 17 December 2020

David Butlion (16 December 1944 – 8 March 2005) was a South African cricketer. He played in three List A matches for Eastern Province from 1969/70 to 1973/74.

== See also ==
- List of Eastern Province representative cricketers
