= Peter Amm =

South African cricketer (born 1962)

Personal information
- Born: 5 July 1962 (age 64); Salem, South Africa
- Source: Cricinfo, 17 December 2020

Peter Amm (born 5 July 1962) is a South African cricketer. He played in one List A and nineteen first-class matches for Eastern Province from 1987/88 to 1990/91.

== See also ==
- List of Eastern Province representative cricketers
