= Quinton de Bruin =

South African cricketer (born 1975)

Quinton de Bruind
Personal information
- Born: 12 August 1975 (age 51); Durban, South Africa
- Source: Cricinfo, 17 December 2020

Quinton de Bruin (not to be confused with Quinton de Kock) (born 12 August 1975) is a South African cricketer. He played in seven first-class matches for Eastern Province in 1994/95 and 1995/96.

== See also ==
- List of Eastern Province representative cricketers
