= Duncan Buyskes =

South African cricketer (1912–1994)

Personal information
- Born: 17 September 1912; Calvinia, South Africa
- Died: 31 October 1994 (aged 82)
- Source: Cricinfo, 17 December 2020

Duncan Buyskes (17 September 1912 – 31 October 1994) was a South African cricketer. He played in one first-class match for Eastern Province in 1933/34.

== See also ==
- List of Eastern Province representative cricketers
