= Herbert Feltham =

South African cricketer (1920–1994)

Personal information
- Born: 18 April 1920; Port Elizabeth, South Africa
- Died: 26 June 1994 (aged 74); East London, South Africa
- Source: Cricinfo, 17 December 2020

Herbert Feltham (18 April 1920 – 26 June 1994) was a South African cricketer. He played in seventeen first-class matches for Eastern Province from 1945/46 to 1951/52.

== See also ==
- List of Eastern Province representative cricketers
