= John Ferrant =

South African cricketer (1934–2017)

Personal information
- Born: 2 August 1934; Port Elizabeth, South Africa
- Died: 3 December 2017 (aged 83); Port Elizabeth, South Africa
- Source: Cricinfo, 17 December 2020

John Ferrant (2 August 1934 – 3 December 2017) was a South African cricketer. He played in 43 first-class matches for Eastern Province from 1956/57 to 1970/71.

== See also ==
- List of Eastern Province representative cricketers
