= John Brann =

South African cricketer (1892–1945)

Personal information
- Born: 20 January 1892; Port Elizabeth, Cape Colony
- Died: 28 June 1945 (aged 53); Port Elizabeth, South Africa
- Source: Cricinfo, 17 December 2020

John Brann (20 January 1892 – 28 June 1945) was a South African cricketer. He played in twelve first-class matches for Eastern Province from 1910/11 to 1921/22.

== See also ==
- List of Eastern Province representative cricketers
