= Bernard Lynch =

South African cricketer (1917–2011)

Personal information
- Born: 20 February 1917; Port Elizabeth, South Africa
- Died: 3 November 2011 (aged 94); Port Elizabeth, South Africa
- Source: Cricinfo, 16 March 2021

Bernard Lynch (20 February 1917 – 3 November 2011) was a South African cricketer. He played in seventeen first-class matches for Eastern Province between 1936/37 and 1947/48.

== See also ==
- List of Eastern Province representative cricketers
