= Richard Seymour (cricketer) =

South African cricketer (born 1946)

Personal information
- Born: 29 October 1946 (age 80); Cape Town, South Africa
- Source: Cricinfo, 30 March 2021

Richard Seymour (born 29 October 1946) is a South African cricketer. He played in ten first-class matches between 1975/76 and 1978/79.

== See also ==
- List of Eastern Province representative cricketers
