= Laurence Impey =

South African cricketer (1923–1988)

Personal information
- Born: 7 January 1923; Cape Town, South Africa
- Died: 19 July 1988 (aged 65); Cape Town, South Africa
- Source: Cricinfo, 17 March 2021

Laurence Impey (7 January 1923 – 19 July 1988) was a South African cricketer. He played in twelve first-class matches between 1946/47 and 1955/56.

== See also ==
- List of Eastern Province representative cricketers
