= Edgar Beck (cricketer) =

South African cricketer (1889–1961)

Personal information
- Born: 21 April 1889; Port Elizabeth, South Africa
- Died: 28 August 1961 (aged 72); Port Elizabeth, South Africa
- Source: Cricinfo, 17 December 2020

Edgar Beck (12 April 1889 – 28 August 1961) was a South African cricketer. He played in three first-class matches for Eastern Province in 1908/09.

== See also ==
- List of Eastern Province representative cricketers
