= Ernest Crage =

South African cricketer (1873–1951)

Personal information
- Born: 4 May 1873; Port Elizabeth, South Africa
- Died: 29 December 1951 (aged 78); Stutterheim, South Africa
- Source: Cricinfo, 17 December 2020

Ernest Crage (4 May 1873 – 29 December 1951) was a South African cricketer. He played in two first-class matches for Eastern Province in 1893/94.

== See also ==
- List of Eastern Province representative cricketers
