= Hart Bennett =

South African cricketer

Personal information
- Born: 1 April 1906; Wakkerstroom, South Africa
- Died: 8 December 1969 (aged 63); Eshowe, South Africa
- Source: Cricinfo, 17 December 2020

Hart Bennett (1 April 1906 – 8 December 1969) was a South African cricketer. He played in three first-class matches for Eastern Province from 1924/25 to 1926/27.

== See also ==
- List of Eastern Province representative cricketers
