= Colin Archibald (South African cricketer) =

South African cricketer (born 1942)

Personal information
- Born: 26 May 1942 (age 84); Durban, South Africa
- Source: Cricinfo, 17 December 2020

Colin Archibald (born 26 May 1942) is a South African cricketer. He played in six first-class matches for Eastern Province in 1963/64.

== See also ==
- List of Eastern Province representative cricketers
