= Kevin Duckworth (cricketer) =

South African cricketer (born 1974)

Personal information
- Born: 27 March 1974 (age 52); Salisbury, Rhodesia
- Source: Cricinfo, 17 December 2020

Kevin Duckworth (born 27 March 1974) is a South African cricketer. He played in two first-class and seventeen List A matches for Eastern Province from 1999/00 to 2001/02.

== See also ==
- List of Eastern Province representative cricketers
