= Howard Emslie =

South African cricketer (1922–1985)

Personal information
- Born: 22 August 1922; Grahamstown, South Africa
- Died: 1 May 1985 (aged 62); Grahamstown, South Africa
- Source: Cricinfo, 17 December 2020

Howard Emslie (22 August 1922 – 1 May 1985) was a South African cricketer. He played in twenty-eight first-class matches for Eastern Province from 1946/47 to 1956/57.

== See also ==
- List of Eastern Province representative cricketers
