= Frank Bayes =

South African cricketer (1886–1950)

Personal information
- Born: 21 July 1886; Grahamstown, Cape Colony
- Died: 24 March 1950 (aged 63); Port Elizabeth, South Africa
- Source: Cricinfo, 17 December 2020

Frank Bayes (21 July 1886 – 24 March 1950) was a South African cricketer. He played in five first-class matches for Eastern Province from 1906/07 to 1908/09.

== See also ==
- List of Eastern Province representative cricketers
