= Russell Searle =

South African cricketer (1912–1964)

Personal information
- Born: 13 January 1912; Port Elizabeth, South Africa
- Died: 31 December 1964 (aged 52); King William's Town, South Africa
- Source: Cricinfo, 30 March 2021

Russell Searle (13 January 1912 – 31 December 1964) was a South African cricketer. He played in twenty-five first-class matches between 1930/31 and 1950/51.

== See also ==
- List of Eastern Province representative cricketers
