= David Brickett =

South African cricketer (born 1950)

Personal information
- Born: 9 December 1950 (age 75); Port Elizabeth, South Africa
- Source: Cricinfo, 17 December 2020

David Brickett (born 9 December 1950) is a South African cricketer. He played in 106 first-class and 48 List A matches for Eastern Province from 1971/72 to 1984/85.

== See also ==
- List of Eastern Province representative cricketers
