= Pierre Botha =

South African cricketer (born 1975)

Personal information
- Born: 14 July 1975 (age 51); Roodepoort, South Africa
- Source: Cricinfo, 17 December 2020

Pierre Botha (born 14 July 1975) is a South African cricketer. He played in one first-class match for Eastern Province in 1996/97.

== See also ==
- List of Eastern Province representative cricketers
