= William Glisson =

South African cricketer (1882–1964)

Personal information
- Born: 8 July 1882; Port Elizabeth, Cape Colony
- Died: 10 August 1964 (aged 82); Uitenhage, South Africa
- Source: Cricinfo, 17 December 2020

William Glisson (8 July 1882 – 10 August 1964) was a South African cricketer. He played in seventeen first-class matches for Eastern Province from 1906/07 to 1922/23.

== See also ==
- List of Eastern Province representative cricketers
