= Laurence Davis =

South African cricketer (1930–1974)

Personal information
- Born: 13 September 1930; Lobito Bay, Angola
- Died: 29 March 1974 (aged 43)
- Source: Cricinfo, 17 December 2020

Laurence Davis (13 September 1930 – 29 March 1974) was a South African cricketer. He played in two first-class matches for Eastern Province in 1950/51.

== See also ==
- List of Eastern Province representative cricketers
