= Raymond Mardon =

South African cricketer (1912–1984)

Personal information
- Born: 5 March 1912; Grahamstown, South Africa
- Died: 24 June 1984 (aged 72); Kempton Park, South Africa
- Source: Cricinfo, 16 March 2021

Raymond Mardon (5 March 1912 – 24 June 1984) was a South African cricketer. He played in fifteen first-class matches for Eastern Province between 1929/30 and 1932/33.

== See also ==
- List of Eastern Province representative cricketers
