= Mark Billson =

South African cricketer (born 1961)

Personal information
- Born: 1 March 1961 (age 65); Port Elizabeth, South Africa

Domestic team information
- Years: Team
- 1982/83–1989/90: Eastern Province
- Source: Cricinfo, 17 December 2020

Mark Billson (born 1 March 1961) is a South African cricketer. He played in 27 first-class and 6 List A matches for Eastern Province from 1982/83 to 1989/90.

== See also ==
- List of Eastern Province representative cricketers
