= Grant Dakin =

South African cricketer (born 1961)

Personal information
- Born: 4 June 1961 (age 65); Port Elizabeth, South Africa
- Source: Cricinfo, 17 December 2020

Grant Dakin (born 4 June 1961) is a South African cricketer. He played in four first-class matches for Eastern Province in 1985/86.

== See also ==
- List of Eastern Province representative cricketers
