= Nigel Brouwers =

South African cricketer (1976–2021)

Personal information
- Full name: Nigel Grant Brouwers
- Born: 4 September 1976; Port Elizabeth, South Africa
- Died: 3 July 2021 (aged 44); Port Elizabeth, South Africa
- Batting: Left-handed
- Bowling: Slow left-arm orthodox
- Role: Bowler

Domestic team information
- Years: Team
- 1998/99: Eastern Province B
- 2000/01: Northerns
- 2004/05–2005/06: Eastern Province
- 2006/07–2009/10: South Western Districts

Career statistics
Competition	First-class	List A
Matches	31	30
Runs scored	955	574
Batting average	18.72	27.33
100s/50s	0/4	0/4
Top score	63	94
Balls bowled	1,957	947
Wickets	75	28
Bowling average	26.09	33.82
5 wickets in innings	3	0
10 wickets in match	0	0
Best bowling	6/57	3/16
Catches/stumpings	22/–	10/–
- Source: Cricinfo, 2 May 2022

Nigel Grant Brouwers (4 September 1976 – 3 July 2021) was a South African cricketer. He played in 31 first-class and 30 List A matches from 1998 to 2009.

Brouwers attended Gelvandale Secondary School and played for Eastern Province Schools in 1991. He made his first-class cricket debut in the 1998/99 season for Eastern Province, before going on to play for Northerns in 2000/01. In the 2006/07 season, Brouwers made his debut for South Western Districts. On his debut for South Western Districts, he made his highest score in first-class cricket, with 63 runs against Kei. In his maiden List A match for the team, he also scored his highest score in the format, with 94 runs. In his first-class career, he took 75 wickets, with his best figures of 6/57 coming against Griqualand West in the 1998/99 season. His best figures in List A cricket came in his final match, against Gauteng, where he took three wickets for sixteen runs.

In February 1999, Brouwers was found guilty of stealing the wallet of fellow cricketer Alan Badenhorst. The incident occurred during Eastern Province's match against Griqualand in the 1998/99 season, with Brouwers taking the wallet from the changing rooms. Brouwers was given twenty hours of community service.

In the 2006/07 season, Brouwers and Sammy-Joe Avontuur set a new opening partnership record for South Western Districts in a List A cricket match. The pair made 109 together against Kei.

Brouwers died in July 2021 from COVID-19, with his mother dying on the same day and his father a week later. South Africa former international cricketer Alviro Petersen said that Brouwers was "one of the most talented cricketers I have known".
