= Hendrik Boshoff =

South African cricketer (born 1958)

Personal information
- Born: 2 August 1958 (age 68); Kroonstad, South Africa
- Source: Cricinfo, 17 December 2020

Hendrik Boshoff (born 2 August 1958) is a South African cricketer. He played in one first-class match for Eastern Province in 1981/82.

== See also ==
- List of Eastern Province representative cricketers
