= Ian Daniell =

South African cricketer (born 1956)

Personal information
- Born: 7 October 1956 (age 70); Port Elizabeth, South Africa
- Source: Cricinfo, 17 December 2020

Ian Daniell (born 7 October 1956) is a South African cricketer. He played in 43 first-class and 29 List A matches for Eastern Province from 1977/78 to 1986/87.

== See also ==
- List of Eastern Province representative cricketers
