= Walter Ackerman =

South African cricketer (born 1938)

Personal information
- Born: 29 July 1938 (age 88); King William's Town, South Africa
- Source: Cricinfo, 17 December 2020

Walter Ackerman (born 29 July 1938) is a South African former cricketer. He played in three first-class matches for Eastern Province in 1970/71.

== See also ==
- List of Eastern Province representative cricketers
