= Darren Moffat =

South African cricketer (born 1977)

Personal information
- Born: 9 August 1977 (age 49); Johannesburg, South Africa
- Source: Cricinfo, 16 March 2021

Darren Moffat (born 9 August 1977) is a South African cricketer. He played in eleven first-class matches for Eastern Province in 1997/98 and 1998/99.

== See also ==
- List of Eastern Province representative cricketers
