= Sibley McAdam =

South African cricketer (born 1948)

Personal information
- Born: 9 March 1948 (age 78); Broken Hill, Northern Rhodesia
- Source: Cricinfo, 16 March 2021

Sibley McAdam (born 9 March 1948) is a South African cricketer. He played in 31 first-class and 5 List A matches between 1967/68 and 1973/74.

== See also ==
- List of Eastern Province representative cricketers
