= Hylton Knowles =

South African cricketer (1928–2009)

Personal information
- Born: 17 November 1928; Durban, South Africa
- Died: 16 February 2009 (aged 80); Pietermaritzburg, South Africa
- Source: Cricinfo, 16 March 2021

Hylton Knowles (17 November 1928 – 16 February 2009) was a South African cricketer. He played in nine first-class matches for Eastern Province between 1952/53 and 1958/59.

== See also ==
- List of Eastern Province representative cricketers
