= Etienne Schmidt =

South African cricketer (born 1950)

Personal information
- Born: 21 September 1950 (age 76); Bloemfontein, South Africa
- Source: Cricinfo, 30 March 2021

Etienne Schmidt (born 21 September 1950) is a South African cricketer. He played in 55 first-class and 19 List A matches between 1970/71 and 1984/85.

== See also ==
- List of Eastern Province representative cricketers
