= William Cawood =

South African cricketer

Personal information
- Born: 29 January 1907; Mount Stewart, South Africa
- Died: 4 July 1976 (aged 69); Storms River Bridge, South Africa
- Source: Cricinfo, 17 December 2020

William Cawood (29 January 1907 – 4 July 1976) was a South African cricketer. He played in four first-class matches for Eastern Province in 1931/32.

== See also ==
- List of Eastern Province representative cricketers
