= Godfrey Borman =

South African cricketer (1939–2019)

Personal information
- Full name: Godfrey Franklin Borman
- Born: 7 May 1939; Grahamstown, South Africa
- Died: 26 April 2019 (aged 79)
- Batting: Right-handed

Domestic team information
- Years: Team
- 1960/61–1963/64: Eastern Province
- Source: Cricinfo, 17 December 2020

Godfrey Franklin Borman (7 May 1939 – 26 April 2019) was a South African cricketer. He played in seven first-class matches for Eastern Province from 1960/61 to 1963/64.

== See also ==
- List of Eastern Province representative cricketers
