= Clinton Rhodes =

South African cricketer (born 1971)

Personal information
- Born: 23 September 1971 (age 55); Pietermaritzburg, South Africa
- Source: Cricinfo, 26 March 2021

Clinton Rhodes (born 23 September 1971) is a South African cricketer. He played in twelve first-class matches between 1990/91 and 1993/94.

== See also ==
- List of Eastern Province representative cricketers
