= Douglas Riemer =

South African cricketer (1917–1996)

Personal information
- Born: 6 August 1917; Port Elizabeth, South Africa
- Died: 26 July 1996 (aged 78); Sandton, South Africa
- Source: Cricinfo, 26 March 2021

Douglas Riemer (6 August 1917 – 26 July 1996) was a South African cricketer. He played in 37 first-class matches between 1934/35 and 1954/55.

== See also ==
- List of Eastern Province representative cricketers
