= Keith Gradwell =

South African cricketer (born 1952)

Personal information
- Born: 23 March 1952 (age 74); Grahamstown, South Africa
- Source: Cricinfo, 17 December 2020

Keith Gradwell (born 23 March 1952) is a South African former cricketer. He played in thirty first-class and four List A matches for Eastern Province from 1977/78 to 1991/92.

== See also ==
- List of Eastern Province representative cricketers
