= Hubert Davison =

South African cricketer

Personal information
- Born: 21 March 1905; Port Elizabeth, South Africa
- Died: 24 April 1987 (aged 82); Cape Town, South Africa
- Source: Cricinfo, 17 December 2020

Hubert Davison (21 March 1905 – 24 April 1987) was a South African cricketer. He played in four first-class matches for Eastern Province from 1925/26 to 1929/30.

== See also ==
- List of Eastern Province representative cricketers
