= Terance Reid =

South African cricketer (born 1957)

Personal information
- Born: 8 May 1957 (age 69); Port Elizabeth, South Africa
- Source: Cricinfo, 26 March 2021

Terance Reid (born 8 May 1957) is a South African cricketer. He played in 43 first-class and 11 List A matches for Eastern Province between 1977/78 and 1989/90.

== See also ==
- List of Eastern Province representative cricketers
