= Duncan Brown (cricketer) =

South African cricketer (born 1972)

Personal information
- Born: 18 February 1972 (age 54); Grahamstown, South Africa
- Source: Cricinfo, 17 December 2020

Duncan Brown (born 18 February 1972) is a South African former cricketer. He played in one first-class match for Eastern Province in 1991/92.

== See also ==
- List of Eastern Province representative cricketers
