= Douglas Crooks =

South African cricketer

Personal information
- Born: 7 April 1872; Port Elizabeth, Cape Colony
- Died: 6 January 1930 (aged 57); East London, South Africa
- Source: Cricinfo, 17 December 2020

Douglas Crooks (7 April 1872 – 6 January 1930) was a Cape Colony cricketer. He played in three first-class matches for Eastern Province in 1902/03.

== See also ==
- List of Eastern Province representative cricketers
