= Michael Beamish =

South African cricketer (born 1969)

Personal information
- Full name: Michael Gwynne Beamish
- Born: 30 July 1969 (age 57); King William's Town, South Africa
- Source: Cricinfo, 17 December 2020

Michael Gwynne Beamish (born 30 July 1969) is a South African former cricketer. He played in 32 first-class matches for Eastern Province from 1993/94 to 1998/99.

== See also ==
- List of Eastern Province representative cricketers
