= Douglas Bennett (cricketer, born 1912) =

South African cricketer (1912–1984)

Personal information
- Born: 28 February 1912; Port Elizabeth, South Africa
- Died: 23 October 1984 (aged 72); Port Elizabeth, South Africa
- Source: Cricinfo, 17 December 2020

Douglas Bennett (28 February 1912 – 23 October 1984) was a South African cricketer. He played in ten first-class matches for Eastern Province from 1934/35 to 1936/37.

== See also ==
- List of Eastern Province representative cricketers
