= Jeffrey Frans =

South African cricketer (born 1952)

Personal information
- Born: 11 February 1952 (age 74); Mossel Bay, South Africa
- Source: Cricinfo, 17 December 2020

Jeffrey Frans (born 11 February 1952) is a South African former cricketer. He played in 55 first-class matches for Eastern Province from 1973/74 to 1987/88.

== See also ==
- List of Eastern Province representative cricketers
