= Jason de Reuck =

South African cricketer (born 1979)

Personal information
- Born: 6 June 1979 (age 47); Port Elizabeth, South Africa
- Source: Cricinfo, 17 December 2020

Jason de Reuck (born 6 June 1979) is a South African cricketer. He played in one first-class match for Eastern Province in 1998/99.

== See also ==
- List of Eastern Province representative cricketers
