= Malcolm Clark (cricketer) =

South African cricketer

Personal information
- Full name: Malcolm Edward Clark
- Born: 24 July 1929; Port Elizabeth, South Africa
- Died: 24 January 1974 (aged 44)
- Batting: Right-handed
- Bowling: Right-arm fast-medium

Domestic team information
- Years: Team
- 1950/51–1956/57: Eastern Province
- Source: Cricinfo, 17 December 2020

Malcolm Edward Clark (24 July 1929 – 24 January 1974) was a South African cricketer. He played in six first-class matches for Eastern Province from 1950/51 to 1956/57.

== See also ==
- List of Eastern Province representative cricketers
