= Francois Anker =

South African cricketer (born 1961)

Personal information
- Born: 12 July 1961 (age 65); Humansdorp, South Africa
- Source: Cricinfo, 17 December 2020

Francois Anker (born 12 July 1961) is a South African cricketer. He played in one first-class match for Eastern Province in 1987/88.

== See also ==
- List of Eastern Province representative cricketers
