= Ernest Greathead =

South African cricketer (1891–1951)

Personal information
- Born: 21 March 1891; Grahamstown, Cape Colony
- Died: 20 December 1951 (aged 60); Port Elizabeth, South Africa
- Source: Cricinfo, 17 December 2020

Ernest Greathead (21 March 1891 – 20 December 1951) was a South African cricketer. He played in seven first-class matches for Eastern Province in 1925/26 and 1926/27.

== See also ==
- List of Eastern Province representative cricketers
