= Neville Mallett =

South African cricketer (born 1938)

Personal information
- Born: 9 September 1938 (age 88); Alexandria, South Africa
- Source: Cricinfo, 21 March 2021

Neville Mallett (born 9 September 1938) is a South African cricketer. He played in 32 first-class matches for Eastern Province between 1956/57 and 1969/70.

== See also ==
- List of Eastern Province representative cricketers
