= Douglas Dold =

South African cricketer (1895–1980)

Personal information
- Born: 13 December 1895; Grahamstown, Cape Colony
- Died: 2 October 1980 (aged 84); Clumber, South Africa
- Source: Cricket Archive, 17 December 2020

Douglas Dold (13 December 1895 – 2 October 1980) was a South African cricketer. He played in two first-class matches for Eastern Province in 1922/23 and 1924/25.

== See also ==
- List of Eastern Province representative cricketers
