= Michael Basson =

South African cricketer (born 1958)

Personal information
- Born: 26 May 1958 (age 68); Uitenhage, South Africa
- Source: Cricinfo, 17 December 2020

Michael Basson (born 26 May 1958) is a South African former cricketer. He played in one first-class match for Eastern Province in 1980/81.

== See also ==
- List of Eastern Province representative cricketers
