= Dickey Elliott =

South African cricketer (born 1955)

Personal information
- Born: 1 January 1955 (age 71); Grahamstown, South Africa
- Source: Cricinfo, 17 December 2020

Dickey Elliott (born 1 January 1955) is a South African former cricketer. He played in fourteen first-class and two List A matches for Eastern Province from 1976/77 and 1979/80.

== See also ==
- List of Eastern Province representative cricketers
