= Brian Desfountain =

South African cricketer (born 1948)

Personal information
- Born: 19 June 1948 (age 78); Port Elizabeth, South Africa
- Source: Cricinfo, 17 December 2020

Brian Desfountain (born 19 June 1948) is a South African cricketer. He played in three first-class matches for Eastern Province in 1977/78.

== See also ==
- List of Eastern Province representative cricketers
