= Clarence Smith (cricketer) =

South African cricketer

Personal information
- Born: 11 March 1902; Lady Grey, South Africa
- Died: 9 January 1982 (aged 79); Port Elizabeth, South Africa
- Source: Cricinfo, 30 March 2021

Clarence Smith (11 March 1902 – 9 January 1982) was a South African cricketer. He played in sixteen first-class matches for Eastern Province between 1934/35 and 1939/40.

== See also ==
- List of Eastern Province representative cricketers
