= Neal Mandy =

South African cricketer (born 1962)

Personal information
- Born: 5 November 1962 (age 64); Port Elizabeth, South Africa
- Source: Cricinfo, 21 March 2021

Neal Mandy (born 5 November 1962) is a South African cricketer. He played in ten first-class matches for Eastern Province between 1980/81 and 1983/84.

== See also ==
- List of Eastern Province representative cricketers
