= Herbert Dorrington =

South African cricketer (1889–1941)

Personal information
- Born: 21 June 1889; Port Elizabeth, Cape Colony
- Died: 2 January 1941 (aged 51); Port Elizabeth, South Africa
- Source: Cricinfo, 17 December 2020

Herbert Dorrington (21 June 1889 – 2 January 1941) was a South African cricketer. He played in four first-class matches for Eastern Province from 1908/09 to 1912/13.

== See also ==
- List of Eastern Province representative cricketers
