= Charles Ahlfeldt =

South African cricketer (1952–1978)

Personal information
- Full name: Charles Frederick Ahlfeldt
- Born: 7 December 1952; Port Elizabeth, South Africa
- Died: 20 August 1978 (aged 25); Port Elizabeth, South Africa
- Batting: Right-handed
- Bowling: Right-arm fast-medium
- Role: Bowler

Domestic team information
- Years: Team
- 1975/76 to 1977/78: Eastern Province

Career statistics
Competition	First-class
Matches	5
Runs scored	13
Batting average	3.25
100s/50s	0/0
Top score	11
Balls bowled	872
Wickets	23
Bowling average	16.47
5 wickets in innings	1
10 wickets in match	0
Best bowling	5/68
Catches/stumpings	2/–
- Source: Cricinfo, 15 July 2021

Charles Ahlfeldt (7 December 1952 – 20 August 1978) was a South African cricketer. He played in five first-class matches for Eastern Province from 1975/76 to 1977/78.

Ahlfeldt was a fast-medium bowler. He suffered injury problems throughout his short career and was grossly overweight and a poor fieldsman and batsman, but he was an effective opening bowler, generating surprising pace from a short run-up. His best figures were 5 for 68 for Eastern Province B against Orange Free State in 1977/78. He died suddenly in his home town of Port Elizabeth at the age of 25.

== See also ==
- List of Eastern Province representative cricketers
