= Ramsey Forword =

South African cricketer (1925–2006)

Personal information
- Born: 25 September 1925; Grahamstown, South Africa
- Died: 21 March 2006 (aged 80); Port Alfred, South Africa
- Source: Cricinfo, 17 December 2020

Ramsey Forword (25 September 1925 – 21 March 2006) was a South African cricketer. He played in eight first-class matches for Eastern Province from 1952/53 and 1956/57.

== See also ==
- List of Eastern Province representative cricketers
