= Peter Copeland (cricketer) =

South African cricketer (1933–2020)

Personal information
- Born: 27 December 1933; Grahamstown, South Africa
- Died: 6 October 2020 (aged 86)
- Source: Cricinfo, 17 December 2020

Peter Harrison Copeland (27 December 1933 – 6 October 2020) was a South African cricketer. He played in 29 first-class matches for Eastern Province from 1956/57 to 1962/63. Copeland died on 6 October 2020, at the age of 86.

== See also ==
- List of Eastern Province representative cricketers
