= Vernon Longworth =

South African cricketer (1877–1963)

Personal information
- Born: 30 August 1877; Port Elizabeth, Cape Colony
- Died: 14 February 1963 (aged 85); Port Elizabeth, South Africa
- Source: Cricinfo, 16 March 2021

Vernon Longworth (30 August 1877 – 14 February 1963) was a South African cricketer. He played in ten first-class matches for Eastern Province between 1910/11 and 1912/13.

== See also ==
- List of Eastern Province representative cricketers
