= Alan Hector =

South African cricketer (1939–1986)

Personal information
- Full name: Alan Roy Hector
- Born: 26 October 1939; Springs, Transvaal, South Africa
- Died: 13 March 1986 (aged 46); Durban, Natal, South Africa
- Batting: Right-handed
- Bowling: Right-arm medium pace
- Relatives: Benjamin Hector (son)

Career statistics
Competition	FC	LA
Matches	34	2
Runs scored	595	2
Batting average	13.52	2.00
100s/50s	0/0	0/0
Top score	49	2
Balls bowled	6661	126
Wickets	117	3
Bowling average	25.21	28.33
5 wickets in innings	4	0
10 wickets in match	0	–
Best bowling	5/22	2/52
Catches/stumpings	29/–	2/–
- Source: Cricinfo, 19 February 2023

Alan Roy Hector (26 October 1939 – 13 March 1986) was a South African cricketer. He played in 34 first-class and 2 List A matches between 1962/63 and 1970/71.

== See also ==
- List of Eastern Province representative cricketers
