= Stephen Fensham =

South African cricketer (born 1985)

Personal information
- Born: 17 September 1985 (age 41); Port Elizabeth, South Africa
- Source: Cricinfo, 17 December 2020

Stephen Fensham (born 17 September 1985) is a South African cricketer. He played in four first-class and six List A matches for Eastern Province in 2005 and 2006.

== See also ==
- List of Eastern Province representative cricketers
