= William Boltman =

South African cricketer

Personal information
- Born: 16 May 1893; Graaff-Reinet, Cape Colony
- Source: Cricinfo, 17 December 2020

William Boltman (born 16 May 1893, date of death unknown) was a South African cricketer. He played in thirteen first-class matches for Eastern Province from 1921/22 to 1931/32.

== See also ==
- List of Eastern Province representative cricketers
