= Ronald Robson =

South African cricketer (1912–1986)

Personal information
- Born: 1 December 1912; Mossel Bay, South Africa
- Died: 16 May 1986 (aged 73); Port Elizabeth, South Africa
- Source: Cricinfo, 30 March 2021

Ronald Robson (1 December 1912 – 16 May 1986) was a South African cricketer. He played in fifteen first-class matches for Eastern Province between 1933/34 and 1939/40.

== See also ==
- List of Eastern Province representative cricketers
