= Peter Barclay =

South African cricketer (born 1965)

Personal information
- Born: 22 July 1965 (age 61); Port Elizabeth, South Africa
- Source: Cricinfo, 17 December 2020

Peter Barclay (born 22 July 1965) is a South African cricketer. He played in sixteen first-class matches for Eastern Province from 1985/86 to 1995/96.

== See also ==
- List of Eastern Province representative cricketers
