= Christopher Biggs =

South African cricketer (born 1979)

Personal information
- Born: 25 March 1979 (age 47); Port Elizabeth, South Africa
- Source: Cricinfo, 17 December 2020

Christopher Biggs (born 25 March 1979) is a South African cricketer. He played in four first-class matches for Eastern Province in 1998/99.

== See also ==
- List of Eastern Province representative cricketers
