= John Leibbrandt =

South African cricketer (1920–1996)

Personal information
- Born: 14 March 1920; Johannesburg, South Africa
- Died: 15 May 1996 (aged 76); Johannesburg, South Africa
- Source: Cricinfo, 16 March 2021

John Leibbrandt (14 March 1920 – 15 May 1996) was a South African cricketer. He played in 31 first-class matches between 1939/40 and 1951/52.

== See also ==
- List of Eastern Province representative cricketers
