= Marcelle Michau =

South African cricketer (born 1963)

Personal information
- Born: 14 August 1963 (age 63); Cradock, South Africa
- Source: Cricinfo, 16 March 2021

Marcelle Michau (born 14 August 1963) is a South African former cricketer. He played in 76 first-class and 74 List A matches between 1981/82 and 1994/95.

== See also ==
- List of Eastern Province representative cricketers
