= Philip Bruce =

South African cricketer (born 1971)

Personal information
- Born: 17 August 1971 (age 55); Durban, South Africa
- Source: Cricinfo, 17 December 2020

Philip Bruce (born 17 August 1971) is a South African cricketer. He played in one first-class match for Eastern Province in 1996/97.

== See also ==
- List of Eastern Province representative cricketers
