= Shukri Abrahams =

South African cricketer (1968–2019)

Personal information
- Born: 22 October 1968; Port Elizabeth, South Africa
- Died: 3 February 2019 (aged 50); Eastern Cape, South Africa
- Source: Cricket Archive, 24 April 2021

Shukri Abrahams (22 October 1968 – 3 February 2019) was a South African cricketer. He played in four first-class matches in 1986/87 to 1987/88 for Eastern Province. Following his playing career, he became a cricket coach at the Western Cape Sports School. Abrahams was killed in a car crash on the N2 road between Storms River and Humansdorp.

== See also ==
- List of Eastern Province representative cricketers
