= Paul Rayment =

South African cricketer (born 1965)

Personal information
- Born: 24 July 1965 (age 61); Cape Town, South Africa
- Source: Cricinfo, 26 March 2021

Paul Rayment (born 24 July 1965) is a South African cricketer. He played in 49 first-class and 58 List A matches between 1984/85 and 1993/94.

== See also ==
- List of Eastern Province representative cricketers
