= Errol Eichstadt =

South African cricketer (born 1938)

Personal information
- Born: 5 October 1938 (age 88); Worcester, South Africa
- Source: Cricinfo, 17 December 2020

Errol Eichstadt (born 5 October 1938) is a South African former cricketer. He played in one first-class match for Eastern Province in 1968/69.

== See also ==
- List of Eastern Province representative cricketers
