= Andre Peters =

South African cricketer (born 1965)

Personal information
- Born: 29 April 1965 (age 61); Port Elizabeth, South Africa
- Source: Cricinfo, 26 March 2021

Andre Peters (born 29 April 1965) is a South African cricketer. He played in 51 first-class matches for Eastern Province between 1982/83 and 1998/99. After his cricketing career, he moved to Australia.

== See also ==
- List of Eastern Province representative cricketers
