= Edward Fouche =

South African cricketer (born 1934)

Personal information
- Born: 14 October 1934 (age 92); Port Elizabeth, South Africa
- Source: Cricinfo, 17 December 2020

Edward Fouche (born 14 October 1934) is a South African cricketer. He played in one first-class match for Eastern Province in 1960/61.

== See also ==
- List of Eastern Province representative cricketers
