= James Bilbrough =

South African cricketer (1911–1944)

Personal information
- Born: 3 May 1911; Springs, South Africa
- Died: 5 November 1944 (aged 33); Brakpan, South Africa
- Source: Cricinfo, 17 December 2020

James Bilbrough (3 May 1911, Springs – 5 November 1944, Brakpan) was a South African cricketer. He played in three first-class matches for Eastern Province in 1928/29.

== See also ==
- List of Eastern Province representative cricketers
