= Shelsley Court =

South African cricketer (1869–1934)

Personal information
- Born: September 1869; Port Elizabeth, Cape Colony
- Died: 20 May 1934 (aged 64); Durban, South Africa
- Source: Cricinfo, 17 December 2020

Shelsley Court (September 1869 – 20 May 1934) was a South African cricketer. He played in two first-class matches for Eastern Province in 1893/94.

== See also ==
- List of Eastern Province representative cricketers
