= Raymond Connell =

South African cricketer (1917–1968)

Personal information
- Full name: Gordon Raymond Connell
- Born: 16 October 1917; Port Elizabeth, South Africa
- Died: 3 July 1968 (aged 50); Johannesburg, South Africa
- Source: Cricinfo, 17 December 2020

Raymond Connell (16 October 1917 – 3 July 1968) was a South African cricketer. He played in seventeen first-class matches for Eastern Province from 1945/46 to 1952/53.

== See also ==
- List of Eastern Province representative cricketers
