= Claude Green =

South African cricketer

Personal information
- Born: 24 November 1906; Port Elizabeth, South Africa
- Died: 3 February 1986 (aged 79); Uitenhage, South Africa
- Source: Cricinfo, 17 December 2020

Claude Green (24 November 1906 – 3 February 1986) was a South African cricketer. He played in four first-class matches for Eastern Province in 1929/30.

== See also ==
- List of Eastern Province representative cricketers
