= Thokozani Peter =

South African cricketer (born 1991)

Personal information
- Born: 20 January 1991 (age 35)
- Source: Cricinfo, 26 March 2021

Thokozani Peter (born 20 January 1991) is a South African cricketer. He played in 28 first-class, 20 List A and 10 Twenty20 matches between 2014 and 2018.

== See also ==
- List of Eastern Province representative cricketers
