= Brett Tucker (cricketer) =

South African cricketer (born 1979)

Personal information
- Born: 4 April 1979 (age 47); Johannesburg, South Africa
- Source: Cricinfo, 30 March 2021

Brett Tucker (born 4 April 1979) is a South African cricketer. He played in 24 first-class and 23 List A matches between 1998 and 2003. In September 2002, Tucker set a new record for the highest score whilst carrying his bat in a first-class cricket match in South Africa, with 182 not out.

== See also ==
- List of Eastern Province representative cricketers
