= Bunny Reid =

South African rugby union player (1910–1976)

- Born: Bernard Charlton Reid; 12 July 1910 East London, Cape Province
- Died: 11 September 1976 (aged 66) East London

Rugby union career
- Position: Fullback
International career
Years	Team	Apps	(Points)
1933	South Africa	1	(0)

Bernard Charlton "Bunny" Reid (12 July 1910 – 11 September 1976) was a South African international rugby union player.

Reid grew up in Port Elizabeth, where he attended Grey High School, but was from East London originally. He played his early rugby at East London club Cambridge and competed for Border provincially. He was capped for the first and only time in a Test match against Australia at Port Elizabeth in 1933, as a full-back.

During the 1930s, Reid was also a competent cricketer and played two first-class matches for the Border cricket team. The first was against Natal in the 1934/35 Currie Cup and the second against Western Province in the same competition, two seasons later. Reid, who played as a right handed lower order batsman, also had a younger brother named Seymour who later played cricket for Border.
