= Hedley Austin =

South African cricketer (born 1960)

Personal information
- Born: 19 December 1960 (age 65); Gwelo, Rhodesia
- Source: Cricinfo, 17 December 2020

Hedley Austin (born 19 December 1960) is a South African cricketer. He played in two first-class matches for Eastern Province in 1983/84 and 1984/85.

== See also ==
- List of Eastern Province representative cricketers
