= Cecil Lowell =

South African cricketer (1913–1989)

Personal information
- Born: 19 November 1913; Johannesburg, South Africa
- Died: 23 April 1989 (aged 75); Durban, South Africa
- Source: Cricinfo, 16 March 2021

Cecil Lowell (19 November 1913 – 23 April 1989) was a South African cricketer. He played in seven first-class matches for Eastern Province between 1939/40 and 1950/51.

== See also ==
- List of Eastern Province representative cricketers
