= Barry Assheton-Smith =

South African cricketer

Personal information
- Born: 17 April 1905; Durban, South Africa
- Died: 22 April 1978 (aged 73); Port Elizabeth, South Africa
- Source: Cricinfo, 17 December 2020

Barry Assheton-Smith (17 April 1905 – 22 April 1978) was a South African cricketer. He played in four first-class matches for Eastern Province in 1939/40.

== See also ==
- List of Eastern Province representative cricketers
