= Horace Pittaway =

South African cricketer (born 1941)

Personal information
- Full name: Horace Claude Pittaway
- Born: 20 March 1941 (age 85); Grahamstown, South Africa
- Source: Cricinfo, 26 March 2021

Horace Pittaway (born 20 March 1941) is a South African former cricketer. He played in fifteen first-class and four List A matches for Eastern Province between 1968/69 and 1972/73.

== See also ==
- List of Eastern Province representative cricketers
