= Ronald Colling =

South African cricketer (1947–2022)

Personal information
- Full name: Ronald Kolo Colling
- Born: 25 April 1947; Roodepoort, South Africa
- Died: 19 July 2022 (aged 75)
- Batting: Right-handed
- Role: Wicket-keeper

Domestic team information
- Years: Team
- 1966/67–1973/74: Eastern Province
- Source: Cricinfo, 17 December 2020

Ronald Kolo Colling (25 April 1947 – 19 July 2022) was a South African cricketer. He played in fifteen first-class and two List A matches for Eastern Province from 1966/67 to 1973/74.

== See also ==
- List of Eastern Province representative cricketers
