= Kenneth Johnson (cricketer) =

South African cricketer (born 1923)

Personal information
- Full name: Kenneth Harold Johnson
- Born: 9 November 1923; Cape Town, South Africa
- Source: Cricinfo, 16 March 2021

Kenneth Harold Johnson (born 9 November 1923) was a South African cricketer. He played in thirteen first-class matches for Eastern Province between 1950/51 and 1953/54.

== See also ==
- List of Eastern Province representative cricketers
