= Peter Stopforth =

South African cricketer (1908–1987)

Personal information
- Born: 22 October 1908; Kimberley, South Africa
- Died: 29 October 1987 (aged 79); Port Elizabeth, South Africa
- Source: Cricinfo, 30 March 2021

Peter Stopforth (22 October 1908 – 29 October 1987) was a South African cricketer. He played in fourteen first-class matches between 1925/26 and 1936/37.

== See also ==
- List of Eastern Province representative cricketers
