= John Stephenson (South African cricketer) =

South African cricketer (born 1955)

Personal information
- Born: 26 March 1955 (age 71); Grahamstown, South Africa
- Source: Cricinfo, 30 March 2021

John Stephenson (born 26 March 1955) is a South African former cricketer. He played in 31 first-class and 10 List A matches between 1974/75 and 1984/84.

== See also ==
- List of Eastern Province representative cricketers
