= Anthony Hobson (South African cricketer) =

South African cricketer (born 1963)

Personal information
- Born: 25 January 1963 (age 63); Jansenville, South Africa
- Source: Cricinfo, 16 March 2021

Anthony Hobson (born 25 January 1963) is a South African cricketer. He played in 61 first-class matches between 1982/83 and 1997/98.

== See also ==
- List of Eastern Province representative cricketers
