= Irvine Drimmie =

South African cricketer (1913–1974)

Personal information
- Born: 28 September 1913; Port Elizabeth, South Africa
- Died: 1 August 1974 (aged 60); Port Elizabeth, South Africa
- Source: Cricinfo, 17 December 2020

Irvine Drimmie (28 September 1913 – 1 August 1974) was a South African cricketer. He played in six first-class matches for Eastern Province in 1939/40.

== See also ==
- List of Eastern Province representative cricketers
