= Neville Ferreira =

South African cricketer (1910–1990)

Personal information
- Born: 8 December 1910
- Died: 22 April 1990 (aged 79)
- Source: Cricinfo, 17 December 2020

Neville Ferreira (8 December 1910 – 22 April 1990) was a South African cricketer. He played in four first-class matches for Eastern Province from 1933/34 to 1938/39.

== See also ==
- List of Eastern Province representative cricketers
