= Sean Adair =

South African cricketer (born 1986)

Personal information
- Born: 26 December 1986 (age 39); Johannesburg, South Africa
- Source: Cricinfo, 17 December 2020

Sean Adair (born 26 December 1986) is a South African cricketer. He played in 53 first-class, 47 List A, and 4 Twenty20 matches for Eastern Province from 2006 to 2012.

== See also ==
- List of Eastern Province representative cricketers
