= Kenneth Bond =

South African cricketer (born 1941)

Personal information
- Born: 16 October 1941 (age 85); Johannesburg, South Africa
- Source: Cricinfo, 17 December 2020

Kenneth Bond (born 16 October 1941) is a South African cricketer. He played in 26 first-class and 3 List A matches from 1965/66 to 1972/73.
