= Rani Hendricks =

South African cricketer (1953–2020)

Personal information
- Full name: Emraan Hendricks
- Born: 4 January 1953; Port Elizabeth, South Africa
- Died: 24 March 2020 (aged 67); Port Elizabeth, South Africa
- Source: Cricket Archive, 16 April 2021

Rani Hendricks (4 January 1953 – 24 March 2020) was a South African cricketer. He played in 28 first-class matches from 1972/73 to 1981/82. He was one of the leading all-rounders in South Africa's non-white cricket competitions in the 1970s and 1980.
