= William McAdam (cricketer) =

South African cricketer (born 1944)

Personal information
- Born: 3 October 1944 (age 82); Springs, Transvaal, South Africa
- Source: Cricinfo, 16 March 2021

William McAdam (born 3 October 1944) is a South African cricketer. He played in nineteen first-class and two List A matches between 1966/67 and 1971/72.

== See also ==
- List of Eastern Province representative cricketers
