= William Catton (cricketer) =

South African cricketer (1865–1939)

Personal information
- Born: 1865; London, England
- Died: 14 April 1939 (aged 73–74); Uitenhage, South Africa
- Source: Cricinfo, 17 December 2020

William Catton (1865 – 14 April 1939) was a South African cricketer. He played in two first-class matches for Eastern Province in 1889/90 and 1890/91.

== See also ==
- List of Eastern Province representative cricketers
