= Wikus Botha =

South African cricketer (born 1968)

Personal information
- Full name: Lodewikus Daniel Botha
- Born: 11 April 1968 (age 58); Elsburg, South Africa
- Source: Cricinfo, 17 December 2020

Wikus Botha (born 11 April 1968) is a South African cricketer. He played in 36 first-class and 60 List A matches from 1991/92 to 1998/99.
