= Desmond Dimbleby =

South African cricketer (1919–2008)

Personal information
- Born: 11 September 1919; Cape Town, South Africa
- Died: 21 March 2008 (aged 88); Warkworth, New Zealand
- Source: Cricinfo, 17 December 2020

Desmond Dimbleby (11 September 1919 – 21 March 2008) was a South African cricketer. He played in twenty-one first-class matches from 1936/37 to 1949/50.
