= Maurice Cole (cricketer) =

South African cricketer

Personal information
- Born: 30 April 1901; Uitenhage, Cape Colony
- Died: 23 January 1971 (aged 69); Durban, South Africa
- Source: Cricinfo, 17 December 2020

Maurice Cole (30 April 1901 – 23 January 1971) was a South African cricketer. He played in eighteen first-class matches from 1921/22 to 1934/35.
