= Freddy Turner =

South African rugby union player (1914-2003)

- Born: Frederick George Turner; 18 March 1914 Port Elizabeth, Cape Province, South Africa
- Died: 12 September 2003 (aged 89) Bryanston, Johannesburg, South Africa
- School: Grey High School, Port Elizabeth

Rugby union career
- Position(s): Wing, Centre, Fullback
Amateur team(s)
Years	Team	Apps	(Points)
- Crusader RFC
- Pirates Club
- Hamiltons
- Military College
- Union
- Wanderers Club
Provincial / State sides
Years	Team	Apps	(Points)
1932–34	Eastern Province		
1935–38	Transvaal		
1939–41	Western Province		
- Northern Transvaal
International career
Years	Team	Apps	(Points)
1933–38	South Africa	11	(29)

Frederick George Turner (18 March 1914 – 12 September 2003) was a South African rugby union international who represented his country in 11 Tests. Sometimes his name is given as "Freddie" Turner.

== Cricket career ==
Turner, a graduate of Grey High School, played three first-class cricket matches for Eastern Province in the 1931/32 Currie Cup season. After exactly ten years out of cricket, while he concentrated on rugby, he returned to the field in January 1942 and made his fourth and last first-class appearance, this time with Transvaal. His only wicket in these matches was Rhodesian Victor Robinson while he failed to impress with the bat.

== Rugby union career ==
He played his early rugby at the Crusader RFC and represented four provinces, Eastern Province, Western Province, Transvaal and Northern Transvaal at provincial rugby. On 8 July 1933, Turner became the 232nd Springbok when he made his international debut, against Australia in Cape Town. Aged just 19 at the time, he was also the first South African rugby player to fly to a Test Match after being called up late. He later told friends and family that the biggest challenge that day was finding the airport in Port Elizabeth.

He went on to be capped a further ten times at Test level, including a tour of Australia and New Zealand in 1937. He made his last appearance against the British Isles in 1938 where he scored his fourth and final try. Used mainly on the wing but also at centre and fullback, Turner was handy at kicking goals and managed four conversions and three penalties in his career.

=== Test history ===
No.	Opponents	Results (SA 1st)	Position	Points	Dates	Venue
1.	Australia	17–3	Wing		8 Jul 1933	Newlands, Cape Town
2.	Australia	6–21	Centre		22 Jul 1933	Kingsmead, Durban
3.	Australia	12–3	Wing	3 (1 try)	12 Aug 1933	Ellis Park, Johannesburg
4.	Australia	9–5	Wing		26 Jun 1937	Sydney Cricket Ground, Sydney
5.	Australia	26–17	Wing		17 Jul 1937	Sydney Cricket Ground, Sydney
6.	New Zealand	7–13	Fullback		14 Aug 1937	Athletic Park, Wellington
7.	New Zealand	13–6	Wing	3 (1 try)	4 Sep 1937	Lancaster Park, Christchurch
8.	New Zealand	17–6	Wing	3 (1 try)	25 Sep 1937	Eden Park, Auckland
9.	(United Kingdom) British Isles	26–12	Wing		6 Aug 1938	Ellis Park, Johannesburg
10.	(United Kingdom) British Isles	19–3	Fullback	10 (2 conv, 2 pen)	3 Sep 1938	Crusaders Ground, Port Elizabeth
11.	(United Kingdom) British Isles	16–21	Centre	10 (1 try, 2 conv, 1 pen)	10 Sep 1938	Newlands, Cape Town

Legend: try (3 pts); pen = penalty (3 pts.); conv = conversion (2 pts.), drop = drop kick (4 pts.).

== See also ==
- List of South Africa national rugby union players – Springbok no. 232
