= Russell Fensham =

South African cricketer (born 1957)

Personal information
- Born: 14 November 1957 (age 68); Port Elizabeth, South Africa
- Source: Cricinfo, 17 December 2020

Russell Fensham (born 14 November 1957) is a South African cricketer and field hockey player. He played in 33 first-class and 14 List A matches for Eastern Province from 1979/80 to 1983/84.

== See also ==
- List of Eastern Province representative cricketers
