= Daniel Rossouw =

South African cricketer (born 1970)

Personal information
- Born: 30 April 1970 (age 56); Port Elizabeth, South Africa
- Source: Cricinfo, 30 March 2021

Daniel Rossouw (born 30 April 1970) is a South African cricketer. He played in 20 first-class and 28 List A matches between 1994/95 and 1999/00.

== See also ==
- List of Eastern Province representative cricketers
