= Martin Gleeson (cricketer) =

South African cricketer (1875–1918)

Personal information
- Born: 14 August 1875; Kildare, Ireland
- Died: 17 October 1918 (aged 43); Port Elizabeth, South Africa
- Source: Cricinfo, 17 December 2020

Martin Gleeson (14 August 1875 – 17 October 1918) was a South African cricketer. He played in two first-class matches for Eastern Province in 1893/94 and 1896/97.

== See also ==
- List of Eastern Province representative cricketers
