= Lindsay Reid-Ross =

South African cricketer (born 1953)

Personal information
- Born: 12 October 1953 (age 73); Port Elizabeth, South Africa
- Source: Cricinfo, 26 March 2021

Lindsay Reid-Ross (born 12 October 1953) is a South African cricketer and field hockey player. He played in ten first-class matches between 1975/76 and 1983/84.

== See also ==
- List of Eastern Province representative cricketers
