= Mark Benfield =

South African cricketer (born 1976)

Personal information
- Born: 3 December 1976 (age 49); Potgietersrus, South Africa
- Source: Cricinfo, 17 December 2020

Mark Benfield (born 3 December 1976) is a South African cricketer. He played in 42 first-class and 38 List A matches from 1995/96 to 2001/02.
