= Faghme Abrahams =

South African cricketer

Personal information
- Full name: Faghme Abrahams
- Batting: Left-handed
- Role: Wicket-keeper

Domestic team information
- Years: Team
- 1973/74–1986/87: Eastern Province
- FC debut: 15 February 1974 Eastern Province v Natal
- Last FC: 14 March 1987 Eastern Province v Natal

Career statistics
Competition	First-class (Note: Cricinfo statistics include 63 first-class matches for Abrahams, compared to the 60 listed by CricketArchive. Another player with a similar name, Fareed Abrahams, is credited by CricketArchive with playing three matches for Eastern province in 1971/72.)
Matches	60
Runs scored	1,497
Batting average	18.25
100s/50s	0/4
Top score	86
Catches/stumpings	154/28
- Source: CricketArchive (subscription required), 25 June 2016

Faghme Abrahams is a former South African cricketer, who played cricket during the apartheid-era. As a non-white player, he was restricted to playing in the Howa Bowl, which was not classified as first-class cricket at the time. The games were retrospectively given first-class status during the early 1990s.

Abrahams played for Eastern Province between 1974 and 1987, appearing in at least 60 first-class matches. In the 1978–79 season, when Eastern Province won the Howa Cup, Abrahams was their leading run-scorer, accumulating 227 runs at an average of 25.22. His highest score in first-class cricket was made in March 1978 against Transvaal, when he scored 86 runs in the second innings to help his side to victory.
