= Mansel Bell =

South African cricketer (1888–1930)

Personal information
- Born: 25 October 1888; Idutywa, Cape Colony
- Died: 10 June 1930 (aged 41); Ndola, Rhodesia
- Source: Cricinfo, 17 December 2020

Mansel Bell (25 October 1888 – 10 June 1930) was a South African cricketer. He played in six first-class matches from 1906/07 to 1908/09.
