= Sean Andrews (cricketer, born 1978) =

South African cricketer (born 1978)

Personal information
- Born: 20 January 1978 (age 48); Cape Town, South Africa
- Source: Cricinfo, 17 December 2020

Sean Andrews (born 20 January 1978) is a South African cricketer. He played in three first-class and three List A matches from 1999/00 to 2002/03.
