= Grant Morgan (cricketer) =

South African cricketer and coach (born 1971)

Personal information
- Born: 19 June 1971 (age 53); Port Elizabeth, Cape Province
- Batting: Right-handed
- Role: Wicket-keeper

Domestic team information
- Years: Team
- 1993/94–1996/97: Eastern Province
- 1997/98–1998/99: Northern Transvaal
- Source: ESPNcricinfo, 15 May 2016

Grant Morgan (born 19 May 1971) is a South African cricket coach and former cricketer who plays for Eastern Province and Northern Transvaal. He is right-hand wicket-keeper batsman who was born at Port Elizabeth and educated at Grey High School in Port Elizabeth.

He coached various team like South Africa national under-19 cricket team and Royal Challengers Bangalore as assistant coach and he was also KwaZulu Natal Inland cricket team as coach. He was appointed to take over coaching duties from Lance Klusener at Dolphin in May 2016.
