= Kenneth Dimbleby =

South African cricketer (1914–2006)

Personal information
- Born: 23 October 1914; Cape Town, South Africa
- Died: 2 September 2006 (aged 91); Port Elizabeth, South Africa
- Source: Cricinfo, 17 December 2020

Kenneth Dimbleby (23 October 1914 – 2 September 2006) was a South African cricketer. He played in twenty-eight first-class matches from 1933/34 to 1952/53.
