= Roderic Ripley =

English cricketer

Roderic George Ripley was an English cricketer active from 1922 to 1929 who played for Northamptonshire (Northants) in 1922 and later for Eastern Province in South Africa. He was born in Kettering on 16 May 1900 and died in Kimberley, South Africa, on 29 January 1932. He appeared in six first-class matches as a righthanded batsman who scored 94 runs with a highest score of 23.
