= Stephen Goldsmith (South African cricketer) =

South African cricketer (1868–1951)

Personal information
- Full name: Stephen John Goldsmith
- Born: 14 June 1868; Port Elizabeth, Cape Colony
- Died: 17 May 1951 (aged 82); Port Elizabeth, Union of South Africa

Domestic team information
- Years: Team
- 1893/94: Eastern Province

Career statistics
Competition	First-class
Matches	2
Runs scored	42
Batting average	10.50
100s/50s	0/0
Top score	25
Balls bowled	173
Wickets	3
Bowling average	28.00
5 wickets in innings	0
10 wickets in match	0
Best bowling	2/30
Catches/stumpings	1/–
- Source: CricketArchive, 25 December 2022

Stephen John Goldsmith (14 June 1868 – 17 May 1951) was a South African cricketer. He played in two first-class matches for Eastern Province in 1893/94.
