= Vivian Furmidge =

South African cricketer (1893–1974)

Personal information
- Born: 7 December 1893; Grahamstown, Cape Colony
- Died: 24 May 1974 (aged 80); Bloemfontein, South Africa
- Source: Cricinfo, 17 December 2020

Vivian Furmidge (7 December 1893 – 24 May 1974) was a South African cricketer. He played in twelve first-class matches from 1920/21 to 1929/30.
