= Sydney du Toit =

South African cricketer (1919–1999)

Personal information
- Born: 4 July 1919; Parys, South Africa
- Died: 1 August 1999 (aged 80); Port Elizabeth, South Africa
- Source: Cricinfo, 17 December 2020

Sydney du Toit (4 July 1919 – 1 August 1999) was a South African cricketer. He played in twenty-six first-class matches for from 1946/47 to 1955/56.
