= Trevor Brown (cricketer, born 1940) =

South African cricketer (born 1940)

Personal information
- Born: 25 March 1940 (age 86); Cape Town, South Africa
- Source: Cricinfo, 17 December 2020

Trevor Brown (born 25 March 1940) is a South African cricketer. He played in seven first-class matches from 1957/58 to 1963/64.
