= John Galpin (South African cricketer) =

South African cricketer (1918–1983)

Personal information
- Born: 25 May 1918; Port Elizabeth, South Africa
- Died: 23 December 1983 (aged 65); Port Elizabeth, South Africa
- Source: Cricinfo, 17 December 2020

John Galpin (25 May 1918 – 23 December 1983) was a South African cricketer. He played in one first-class match for Eastern Province in 1935/36.

== See also ==
- List of Eastern Province representative cricketers
