= Rowan Lyle =

South African cricketer (born 1968)

Personal information
- Born: 1 December 1968 (age 57); Kokstad, South Africa
- Source: Cricinfo, 16 March 2021

Rowan Lyle (born 1 December 1968) is a South African cricketer. He played in 40 first-class and 40 List A matches between 1988/89 and 1996/97.

== See also ==
- List of Eastern Province representative cricketers
