= Keith Reid (cricketer) =

South African cricketer (born 1951)

Keith Patrick Reid is a South African former cricketer active from 1970 to 1981 who played for Eastern Province. He made a single appearance for Northamptonshire (Northants) in 1973. He was born in Newton Park, Port Elizabeth, Cape Province on 24 July 1951. He appeared in 57 first-class matches as a righthanded batsman who bowled right arm medium pace. He scored 1,518 runs with a highest score of 109 and took 78 wickets with a best performance of seven for 50.
