= Sergio Arends =

South African cricketer (born 1993)

Personal information
- Born: 8 December 1993 (age 32); Kimberley, South Africa
- Source: Cricinfo, 17 December 2020

Sergio Arends (born 8 December 1993) is a South African cricketer. He played in one List A and three first-class matches in 2015 and 2017.
