= Campbell Munro =

South African cricketer

Personal information
- Born: 22 July 1899; Alicedale, Cape Colony
- Died: 5 October 1943 (aged 44); Johannesburg, South Africa
- Batting: Right-handed
- Bowling: Right-arm fast-medium

Domestic team information
- Years: Team
- 1921–22 to 1926–27: Eastern Province
- 1927–28 to 1928–29: Orange Free State

Career statistics
Competition	First-class
Matches	23
Runs scored	685
Batting average	16.70
100s/50s	0/2
Top score	57
Balls bowled	4689
Wickets	100
Bowling average	23.43
5 wickets in innings	7
10 wickets in match	0
Best bowling	7/81
Catches/stumpings	13/–
- Source: Cricinfo, 29 October 2017

Campbell Munro (22 July 1899 – 5 October 1943) was a South African cricketer who played first-class cricket from 1922 to 1929.

== Life and career ==
Munro went to school in Port Elizabeth and attended Rhodes University in Grahamstown before becoming an accountant. A right-arm pace bowler and useful batsman, in his first season in 1921–22 Munro led the Eastern Province attack, taking 20 wickets in four Currie Cup matches at an average of 24.15. He played only one first-class match in 1922–23, when Eastern Province played the touring MCC. He took 5 for 67, dismissing the top five batsmen, but Eastern Province lost by an innings.

In his first match in 1924–25, Munro made 41 and 53 in the middle order and took 5 for 68 and 3 for 44 against Orange Free State. His next match was for Eastern Province against S. B. Joel's English team when he took 7 for 81 in S. B. Joel's XI's first innings. He was later selected for South Africa in the last of the five unofficial Tests against the English team, taking two wickets in South Africa's victory.

Munro was outstanding for Eastern Province in the Currie Cup in 1926–27, taking 30 wickets at an average of 21.16. Nobody else in the team took more than nine wickets.

Munro played for Orange Free State in his last two seasons, 1927–28 and 1928–29, with moderate success.
