= Harold Donachie =

South African cricketer (1964–2021)

Personal information
- Full name: Harold Hendrik Donachie
- Born: 16 April 1964; Cape Town, South Africa
- Died: 14 November 2021 (aged 57)
- Batting: Right-handed
- Bowling: Right-arm medium

Domestic team information
- Years: Team
- 1990/91: Eastern Province
- 1994/95: Western Province
- Source: Cricinfo, 17 December 2020

Harold Hendrik Donachie (16 April 1964 – 14 November 2021) was a South African cricketer. He played in fourteen first-class and seven List A matches from 1988/89 to 1994/95.
