= John Dugmore (cricketer) =

South African cricketer (born 1950)

Personal information
- Born: 6 December 1950 (age 75); Fort Beaufort, South Africa
- Source: Cricinfo, 17 December 2020

John Dugmore (born 6 December 1950) is a South African cricketer. He played in one first-class match for Eastern Province in 1974/75.

== See also ==
- List of Eastern Province representative cricketers
