= John Harty (cricketer) =

South African cricketer (1936–2004)

Personal information
- Born: 8 August 1936; Grahamstown, South Africa
- Died: 27 April 2004 (aged 67); Port Elizabeth, South Africa
- Source: Cricinfo, 16 March 2021

John Harty (8 August 1936 – 27 April 2004) was a South African cricketer. He played in 49 first-class matches for Eastern Province between 1956/57 and 1965/66.

== See also ==
- List of Eastern Province representative cricketers
