= André Botha =

South African cricketer (born 1972)

Personal information
- Born: 2 July 1972 (age 54); Port Elizabeth, South Africa
- Source: Cricinfo, 17 December 2020

André Botha (born 2 July 1972) is a South African cricketer. He played in six first-class matches for Eastern Province in 1993/94.

== See also ==
- List of Eastern Province representative cricketers
