= Garth Roe =

South African cricketer (born 1973)

Personal information
- Born: 9 July 1973 (age 53); Port Elizabeth, South Africa
- Source: Cricinfo, 30 March 2021

Garth Anthony Roe (born 9 July 1973) is a South African cricketer. He played in 79 first-class and 100 List A matches between 1993 and 2005.

== See also ==
- List of Eastern Province representative cricketers
