= Laurence Ashburnham =

South African cricketer (1875–1951)

Personal information
- Born: 15 July 1875; Grahamstown, Cape Colony
- Died: 21 May 1951 (aged 75); Cape Town, South Africa
- Source: Cricinfo, 17 December 2020

Laurence Ashburnham (15 July 1875 – 21 May 1951) was a South African cricketer. He played in three first-class matches in 1896/97 and 1909/10.
