= Daniel Brown (cricketer) =

South African cricketer

Personal information
- Born: 24 February 1908; Port Elizabeth, South Africa
- Died: 20 March 1972 (aged 64); Port Elizabeth, South Africa
- Source: Cricinfo, 17 December 2020

Daniel Brown (24 February 1908 – 20 March 1972) was a South African cricketer. He played in two first-class matches for Eastern Province in 1929/30.

== See also ==
- List of Eastern Province representative cricketers
