= Wayne Fensham =

South African cricketer (born 1958)

Personal information
- Born: 3 December 1958 (age 67); Port Elizabeth, South Africa
- Source: Cricinfo, 17 December 2020

Wayne Fensham (born 3 December 1958) is a South African cricketer and field hockey player. He played in one first-class match for Eastern Province in 1981/82.

== See also ==
- List of Eastern Province representative cricketers
