= James Furstenburg =

South African cricketer (born 1959)

Personal information
- Born: 23 June 1959 (age 67); Klerksdorp, South Africa
- Source: Cricinfo, 17 December 2020

James Furstenburg (born 23 June 1959) is a South African cricketer. He played in 38 first-class and 5 List A matches from 1979/80 to 1993/94.
