= Jan Dreyer =

South African cricketer (born 1976)

Personal information
- Full name: Jan Nicolaas Dreyer
- Born: 9 September 1976 (age 50); Amanzimtoti, Natal Province, South Africa
- Batting: Right-handed
- Bowling: Right-arm medium

Domestic team information
- Years: Team
- 1995/96: Western Transvaal
- 1996/97-2001/02: North West
- 1998/99: KwaZulu-Natal
- 2000: Warwickshire Cricket Board

Career statistics
Competition	First-class	List A
Matches	26	30
Runs scored	248	175
Batting average	10.33	12.50
100s/50s	0/0	0/0
Top score	40	45*
Balls bowled	4,450	1,138
Wickets	69	28
Bowling average	39.98	37.35
5 wickets in innings	2	0
10 wickets in match	0	0
Best bowling	5/81	3/38
Catches/stumpings	6/–	3/–
- Source: Cricinfo, 27 October 2010

Jan Nicolaas Dreyer (born 9 September 1976) is a South African former cricketer. Dreyer was a right-handed batsman who bowled right-arm medium pace. He was born at Amanzimtoti, Natal Province.

Dreyer made his debut in South African domestic cricket for Western Transvaal in a List A match against Natal in the 1995/96 season. His debut in first-class cricket came for North West against Transvaal B in the 1996/97 season. From 1996/97 to 2001/02, he represented North West in 18 first-class matches. He also played first-class cricket for KwaZulu-Natal and KwaZulu-Natal B in the 1998/99 season. In total, Dreyer played a total of 26 first-class matches, the last of which came for North West against Gauteng. In his 26 first-class matches, he scored 248 runs at a batting average of 10.33, with a high score of 40. In the field he took 6 catches. With the ball he took 69 wickets at a bowling average of 39.98, with two five wicket hauls and best figures of 5/81.

As well as representing Western Transvaal in List A cricket, he also represented North West and KwaZulu-Natal in that format of the game. He played 29 List A matches in South Africa, the last of which came for North West against Griqualand West in the 1999/00 season. He played a single List A match in English County Cricket for the Warwickshire Cricket Board against the Kent Cricket Board in the 2000 NatWest Trophy. In his 30 career List A matches, he scored 175 runs at an average of 12.50, with a high score of 45*. In the field he took 3 catches, while with the ball he took 28 wickets an average of 37.35, with best figures of 3/38.
