= Gavin Cowley =

South African cricketer (born 1953)

Personal information
- Born: 1 March 1953 (age 73); Port Elizabeth, South Africa
- Source: Cricinfo, 17 December 2020

Gavin Cowley (born 1 March 1953) is a South African cricketer. He played in 69 first-class and 48 List A matches from 1970/71 to 1985/86.
