= Peter Furstenburg =

South African cricketer (born 1987)

Personal information
- Born: 16 February 1987 (age 39); Port Elizabeth, South Africa
- Source: Cricinfo, 17 December 2020

Peter Furstenburg (born 16 February 1987) is a South African cricketer. He played in eight first-class, eight List A, and seven Twenty20 matches from 2006 to 2013.
