= Alan Badenhorst =

South African cricketer (born 1970)

Personal information
- Born: 10 July 1970 (age 56); Cape Town, South Africa
- Source: Cricinfo, 6 December 2020

Alan Badenhorst (born 10 July 1970) is a South African cricketer. He played in 35 first-class and 12 List A matches from 1993/94 to 1998/99.

In 1999, Badenhorst was at the centre of a racial vilification scandal while captaining Eastern Province B in a UCB Bowl game against Griqualand West B. He was accused of referring to Griquas player Mario Arthur as a "half-bred kaffir". A United Cricket Board of South Africa disciplinary committee banned Badenhorst from provincial and club cricket for two years, but he denied the claims and the decision was overturned on appeal.

Badenhorst later moved to England where he played club cricket in the Lancashire League.

Badenhorst also rescued windwalkers following their plane crash at Bournemouth Air Festival in 2021 news|url=https://www.bournemouthecho.co.uk/news/19559553.hero-pilot-deserves-medal-says-family-rescued-wingwalkers/
