= Petrus Bouwer du Plessis =

South African cricketer (born 1969)

Personal information
- Born: 13 October 1969 (age 57); Somerset East, South Africa
- Source: Cricinfo, 6 December 2020

Petrus Bouwer du Plessis (born 13 October 1969) is a South African former cricketer. He played in eight first-class and nine List A matches from 1988/89 to 1997/98.
