= Robert Dower =

South African cricketer (1876–1964)

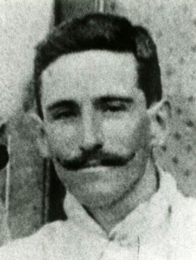

Personal information
- Full name: Robert Reid Dower
- Born: 4 June 1876; Kokstad, Cape Colony
- Died: 15 September 1964 (aged 88); Cape Town, Cape Province, South Africa
- Batting: Right-handed

International information
- National side: South Africa
- Only Test: 14 February 1899 v England

Domestic team information
- Years: Team
- 1896/97–1906/07: Eastern Province

Career statistics
Competition	Test	First-class
Matches	1	6
Runs scored	9	82
Batting average	4.50	6.83
100s/50s	0/0	0/0
Top score	9	17
Catches/stumpings	2/–	5/–
- Source: Cricinfo, 13 November 2022

Robert Reid Dower (4 June 1876 – 15 September 1964) was a Cape Colony cricketer who played in one Test match in 1899. He was also a lawyer.

Dower top-scored in each innings for Eastern Province XV against the touring English team in January 1899, with 30 and 37 as an opening batsman. He was selected to play in the first of two Tests three weeks later, but was not successful batting at number four, and never played another Test. He played only six first-class matches over 10 years, with a highest score of 17.

Dower and his wife Gertrude had four sons and a daughter. At the time of his death in September 1964, aged 88, he was South Africa's oldest living Test cricketer.
