= Graham Grace =

South African cricketer (born 1975)

Personal information
- Born: 16 August 1975 (age 51); Salisbury, Rhodesia
- Source: Cricinfo, 17 December 2020

Graham Grace (born 16 August 1975) is a South African cricketer. He played in 39 first-class and 24 List A matches from 1996 to 2004. Grace also played for Marylebone Cricket Club in 2015 during their tour to South Africa.
