= Clint du Plessis =

South African cricketer (born 1975)

Personal information
- Born: 12 December 1975 (age 50); Cape Town, South Africa
- Source: Cricinfo, 17 December 2020

Clint du Plessis (born 12 December 1975) is a South African cricketer. He played in seven first-class and five List A matches from 1995/96 to 2000/01.
