= List of Border representative cricketers =

List of cricketers

This is a list of all cricketers who have played first-class, List A or Twenty20 cricket for Border cricket team in South Africa.

== A ==
- Gerhardt Abrahams, 2017/18–2018/19
- Hylton Ackerman, 1963/64–1965/66
- Maurice Adey, 1946/47–1947/48
- David Alers, 1981/82
- Philip Amm, 1997/98
- Carl André, 1903/04–1906/07
- William Ayres, 1939/40

== B ==
- Faoud Bacchus, 1985/86
- Alan Badenhorst, 1991/92–1994/95
- Ryan Bailey, 2014/15
- Thomas Baillie, 1897/98
- Richard Baines, 1951/52–1952/53
- Capel Baines, 1929/30
- Edward Baker, 1960/61–1965/66
- Xen Balaskas, 1933/34
- Thomas Ball, 1977/78–1985/86
- Craig Ballantyne, 1994/95–1997/98
- Michael Ballantyne, 1974/75–1985/86
- GH Barnes, 1906/07 (Note: Barnes played in one first–class match for Boland in the 1906/07 season. No biographical details are known.)
- R Barnes, 1902/03–1903/04 (Note: Barnes played in two first–class matches for Boland in the 1902/03 and 1903/04 seasons. No biographical details are known.)
- A Barrington, 1926/27 (Note: Barrington played in one first–class match for Boland in the 1926/27 season. No biographical details are known.)
- Simon Base, 1989/90–1993/94
- Arthur Bauer, 1939/40–1946/47
- Karl Bauermeister, 1987/88–1994/95
- Stanley Bayly, 1891/92–1898/99
- Walter Beauchamp, 1913/14–1923/24
- Alec Bedser, 1971/72
- Raymond Beesly, 1938/39–1953/54
- Bevan Bennett, 1997/98–2013/14
- Douglas Bennett, 1923/24
- Kevin Bennett, 2005/06–2015/16
- Allan Berry, 1925/26–1926/27
- William Bertram, 1902/03
- John Beveridge, 1929/30
- Frans Bezuidenhout, 1974/75–1979/80
- Ernest Birch, 1947/48–1948/49
- Gerald Blake, 1972/73
- Siyabonga Booi, 2007/08–2012/13
- Neil Boonzaaier, 1988/89–1989/90
- Clayton Bosch, 2011/12–2019/20
- Jerome Bossr, 2010/11–2019/20
- Johan Botha, 2004/05
- Piet Botha, 1992/93–2001/02
- Gary Boucher, 1976/77–1980/81
- Mark Boucher, 1994/95–2003/04
- Dudley Bowen, 1925/26
- Raymond Bowen, 1925/26–1934/35
- Harold Bowley, 1929/30–1939/40
- Carl Bradfield, 2004/05–2006/07
- Leo Bradshaw, 1906/07
- William Bremner, 1906/07
- Chris Brent, 1995/96
- Lofty Brits, 1950/51
- Tom Broster, 1902/03
- Darryl Brown, 2001/02–2016/17
- H Brown, 1908/09 (Note: Brown played in two first–class match for Boland in the 1908/09 season. No biographical details are known.)
- Kenneth Brown, 1991/92–1992/93
- Trevor Brown, 1950/51–1952/53
- Mark Bruyns, 2001/02–2003/04
- Clement Bryce, 1906/07
- John Buckley, 1979/80–1980/81
- Mbulelo Budaza, 2012/13–2014/15
- A Burnard, 1891/92–1898/99 (Note: Burnard played in two first–class match for Boland in the 1897/98 season. No biographical details are known.)
- Owen Burns, 1936/37
- Ivan Busse, 1931/32–1946/47
- Robert Byron, 1928/29–1936/37

== C ==
- Mkhululi Calana, 2006/07–2019/20
- James Carse, 1985/86–1993/94
- Wally Chalmers, 1950/51–1959/60
- Richard Chapman, 1938/39
- Frederick Cheshire, 1923/24–1929/30
- Ralph Cheshire, 1913/14–1929/30
- Anthony Chubb, 1947/48
- Geoff Chubb, 1931/32
- Thomas Clack, 1906/07–1909/10
- Alec Clarke, 1924/25–1929/30
- Gihahn Cloete, 2018/19–2019/20
- Cecil Closenberg, 1926/27–1934/35
- Shunter Coen, 1937/38
- Michael Coetzee, 1967/68–1972/73
- Trevor Collins, 1945/46–1949/50
- Kevin Commins, 1958/59–1960/61
- Arthur Cook, 1906/07–1909/10
- George Cook, 1902/03–1910/11 (Note: Cook played in ten first–class match for Boland from 1902/03 to 1910/11. No biographical details are known.)
- Walter Cooper, 1922/23 (Note: Cooper played in one first–class match for Boland in the 1922/23 season. No biographical details are known.)
- Mark Cornell, 1957/58–1960/61
- Patrick Cornell, 1951/52–1954/55
- Peter Cowan, 1981/82
- Jonathan Craniey, 2006/07–2019/20
- Vernon Cresswell, 1985/86
- Basil Crews, 1956/57–1957/58
- Frans Cronje, 1993/94–1996/97
- Gordon Cross, 1903/04–1922/23
- Daryll Cullinan, 1983/84–1995/96
- Ralph Cullinan, 1984/85–1988/89
- Alwyn Curnick, 1945/46–1948/49
- Norman Curry, 1973/74

== D ==
- Gustav Dam, 1931/32
- Donald Davidson, 1936/37
- Frank Davidson, 1939/40
- Thomas Davidson, 1926/27
- Christopher Davies, 1969/70–1981/82
- Douglas Davies, 1902/03
- Marchant Davies, 1913/14
- Ossie Dawson, 1951/52–1961/62
- Anthony de Kock, 1963/64
- Shaun de Kock, 2000/01–2013/14
- Trevor Dennison, 1977/78
- Kevin Deutschmann, 1972/73–1973/74
- Andrew Dewar, 1991/92–1994/95
- Burton de Wett, 1999/00–2014/15
- Charles Dick, 1927/28
- Thomas Dickerson, 1920/21
- Michael Dilley, 1991/92–1992/93
- Tshepang Dithole, 2013/14
- Joshua Dodd, 2018/19–2019/20
- Dereck Dowling, 1937/38–1938/39
- Jeremey Drake, 1991/92
- Vasbert Drakes, 1996/97–2002/03
- Petrus Bouwer du Plessis, 1995/96–1997/98
- W du Plessis, 1982/83 (Note: du Plessis played in two first–class matches for Boland in the 1982/83 season. No biographical details are known.)
- Daniel During, 1952/53–1959/60
- Athenkosi Dyili, 2000/01–2008/09

== E ==
- Charles Eager, 1906/07
- Neville Edwards, 1965/66
- Justin Ehrke, 1992/93–1995/96
- Ronald Elliot-Wilson, 1928/29–1934/35
- Stephen Els, 1957/58–1959/60
- Stuart Els, 2019/20
- Willie Els, 1977/78
- Erik Emslie, 1991/92–1994/95
- Peter Emslie, 1992/93–1998/99
- Beverley Esterhuizen, 1995/96–1999/00
- Richard Evans, 1934/35–1939/40

== F ==
- Kevin Farr, 1975/76–1976/77
- Philip Farrer, 1970/71
- Stephen Farrer, 1929/30–1947/48
- Buster Farrer, 1954/55–1969/70
- Sonwabile Fassi, 2008/09–2011/12
- Peter Fenix, 1958/59–1964/65
- Desmond Fenner, 1946/47–1966/67
- Trevor Fenner, 1962/63
- Evert Ferreira, 2000/01
- Jeftha Fetting, 1960/61–1971/72
- Nolan Flemmer, 1962/63
- Oswald Flemmer, 1925/26–1934/35
- Phaphama Fojela, 2002/03–2019/20
- Burton Forbes, 1997/98–1998/99
- John Forbes, 1952/53
- Mark Ford, 1986/87–1987/88
- Clyde Fortuin, 2015/16
- Brian Foulkes, 1983/84
- Ivor Foulkes, 1971/72–1987/88
- Brenden Fourie, 1987/88–1999/00
- Mathew Fourie, 2015/16–2019/20
- Shaun Fourie, 1992/93–1997/98
- Hugh Francois, 1923/24–1927/28
- Stanley Francois, 1923/24
- Gavin Fraser, 1981/82–1986/87
- Colin Fraser-Grant, 1929/30
- Robert Frisch, 1979/80–1980/81
- Leslie Fuhri, 1991/92–1995/96
- Graham Fuller, 1949/50–1951/52
- Harry Fuller, 1922/23–1926/27
- Sidney Fuller, 1906/07–1934/35

== G ==
- Laden Gamiet, 1993/94–2008/09
- Ivor Gardiner, 1927/28–1937/38
- Murray Gardner, 1936/37
- C Garner, 1933/34–1934/35 (Note: Garner played in three first–class matches for Boland in the 1933/34 and 1934/35 seasons. No biographical details are known.)
- Redmund Geach, 1953/54–1958/59
- Trevor Geach, 1954/55–1956/57
- Graham Geldenhuys, 1984/85–1986/87
- Ottis Gibson, 1992/93–1994/95
- Norman Giddy, 1897/98–1903/04
- Frank Goldschmidt, 1920/21–1929/30
- Bruce Gordon, 1897/98–1903/04
- Kenneth Gordon, 1913/14
- Rodney Gordon, 1939/40–1940/41
- Gary Gower, 1973/74–1986/87
- Ayabulela Gqamane, 2004/05–2019/20
- Liam Graham, 1999/00–2003/04
- Tony Greig, 1964/65–1969/70
- Ian Greig, 1973/74–1979/80
- Kenneth Griffith, 1962/63–1964/65
- Michael Griffith, 1957/58–1964/65
- William Griffith, 1902/03
- Bruce Groves, 1965/66
- Terence Groves, 1965/66–1969/70

== H ==
- Athol Hagemann, 1981/82
- N Hallows, 1983/84 (Note: Hallows played in one List A match for Boland in the 1984/84 season. No biographical details are known.)
- George Hammond, 1997/98–1999/00
- Anthony Hanley, 1939/40
- Martin Hanley, 1939/40
- Thomas Hardiman, 1985/86–1986/87
- William Hards, 1928/29
- Simon Harmer, 2016/17
- Rowan Harmuth, 1971/72–1972/73
- Michael Harper, 1967/68–1976/77
- Robert Harper, 1968/69–1976/77
- Edward Hartigan, 1902/03–1926/27
- Gerald Hartigan, 1903/04–1926/27
- Brian Hartley, 1962/63–1963/64
- Mansfield Hartley, 1981/82–1983/84
- Ian Harty, 1964/65–1981/82
- Chris Harvey, 1928/29 (Note: Harvey played in two first–class matches for Boland in the 1928/29 season. No biographical details are known.)
- Miles Harvey, 1971/72–1972/73
- William Harvey, 1906/07 (Note: Harvey played in two first–class matches for Boland in the 1906/07 season. No biographical details are known.)
- Bill Harvey, 1920/21
- Neville Hawkes, 1960/61–1962/63
- Alfred Haxton, 1963/64–1974/75
- Kenneth Hay, 1951/52–1955/56
- Arthur Hayes, 1950/51–1954/55
- Gregory Hayes, 1972/73–1987/88
- Demitri Hayidakis, 1936/37–1947/48
- Jack Hayward, 1928/29
- Peter Heger, 1963/64–1971/72
- Tyron Henderson, 1998/99–2003/04
- A Henwood, 1971/72 (Note: Henwood played in one List A match for Boland in the 1971/72 season. No biographical details are known.)
- Bob Herman, 1972/73
- Alfred Hicks, 1949/50–1952/53
- Warwick Hinkel, 1997/98–2006/07
- Allan Hinton, 1959/60
- Sid Hird, 1950/51
- Mackie Hobson, 1990/91–1992/93
- Gavin Hogg, 1977/78
- Dennis Hollard, 1947/48
- Ernest Holmes, 1939/40
- Geoff Holmes, 1989/90
- Brendan Horan, 1995/96–1997/98
- Jeffrey Hosking, 1980/81–1984/85
- Bennett Howe, 1955/56
- David Howell, 1989/90–1991/92
- Ian Howell, 1984/85–1997/98
- Percival Hubbard, 1929/30–1946/47
- Neil Hunter, 1961/62–1968/69
- Julian Hykes, 2001/02–2009/10

== J ==
- Kyle Jacobs, 2018/19
- Newton Jarman, 1910/11
- Christopher Jarvis, 1975/76–1976/77
- Winston Jenkins, 1929/30
- Trevor Jesty, 1973/74
- ABE Johnson, 1902/03–1903/04 (Note: Johnson played in three first–class matches for Boland in the 1902/03 and 1903/04 seasons. No biographical details are known.)
- Charles Johnson, 1906/07–1920/21
- Keith Johnson, 1955/56–1958/59
- Mark Joko, 2007/08–2009/10
- Adrian Jones, 1981/82
- Christiaan Jonker, 2015/16–2018/19

== K ==
- Nathaniel Kaschula, 1965/66–1976/77
- Henry Kelly, 1923/24–1926/27
- Donald Kemp, 1951/52–1955/56
- John Kemp, 1946/47–1949/50
- John Kemp, 1975/76–1976/77
- Raymond Kemp, 1967/68–1977/78
- Richard Kent, 1974/75–1982/83
- Stephen Ker-Fox, 1967/68–1993/94
- Ian Key, 1976/77
- Wilfrid Kidson, 1931/32
- Jongile Kilani, 2014/15–2015/16
- CW King, 1897/98–1898/99 (Note: King played in three first–class matches for Boland in the 1897/98 season. No biographical details are known.)
- Greg King, 1995/96
- Noel Kirsten, 1946/47–1960/61
- Paul Kirsten, 1990/91–1991/92
- Peter Kirsten, 1990/91–1996/97
- Cecil Kirton, 1950/51–1952/53
- Keith Kirton, 1945/46–1959/60
- Johan Klopper, 1997/98–2000/01
- HE Knight, 1923/24–1924/25 (Note: Knight played in two first–class matches for Boland in the 1923/24 and 1924/25 seasons. No biographical details are known.)
- Norman Knight, 1966/67–1974/75
- Donald Knott, 1986/87–1991/92
- Sidney Knott, 1951/52–1964/65
- Gionne Koopman, 2004/05–2017/18
- Athule Kotta, 2019/20
- Colin Kretzmann, 1968/69–1970/71
- Justin Kreusch, 1997/98–2012/13
- Murray Krug, 1991/92–1992/93
- Siphamandla Krweqe, 2012/13–2018/19
- Clifford Kuhn, 1951/52

== L ==
- Henry Lacey, 1949/50–1956/57
- Walter Lamplough, 1897/98
- Sithembile Langa, 2010/11–2018/19
- Charl Langeveldt, 2003/04
- Errol Laughlin, 1976/77–1983/84
- John Laurie, 1963/64
- John Lawrence, 1980/81–1984/85
- Andrew Lawson, 1991/92–1994/95
- Michael Lax, 1993/94–1994/95
- Marvin Lazarus, 2012/13
- Donovan Lentz, 1995/96–2005/06
- Raymond le Roux, 1988/89
- Thapelo Letsholo, 2014/15–2015/16
- Philip Levy, 1969/70–1970/71
- Hugo Lindenberg, 1986/87–1991/92
- Adolph Lipke, 1939/40–1947/48
- Ian Lloyd, 1956/57
- Henry Londt, 1903/04
- Bryan Lones, 1986/87–1993/94
- Bruce Long, 1971/72–1974/75
- Grant Long, 1985/86–1990/91
- Geoff Love, 1994/95–2002/03
- Charles Lownds, 1947/48–1948/49
- Lucky Lwana, 2001/02–2013/14
- Anthony Lyons, 1981/82

== M ==
- Charles McAlister, 1920/21–1926/27
- Charles McCalgan, 1978/79
- Colin McCallum, 1920/21
- Cecil McCallum, 1920/21
- Ian McClenaghan, 1968/69–1978/79
- Rod McCurdy, 1992/93
- John McDonagh, 1913/14
- Ken McEwan, 1967/68–1991/92
- Michael McGill, 1975/76–1979/80
- Donald McKenna, 1973/74–1979/80
- Gary McKinnon, 1990/91–1991/92
- Sisanda Magala, 2019/20
- Sihle Magongoma, 2018/19
- Phumzile Majaja, 2016/17–2017/18
- Dumisa Makalima, 1997/98–2004/05
- Bongolwethu Makeleni, 2012/13–2019/20
- Malibongwe Maketa, 1996/97–2002/03
- Viyusa Makhaphela, 2003/04–2014/15
- Lizo Makhosi, 2018/19
- Sithembile Makongolo, 2000/01–2009/10
- Mncedisi Malika, 2013/14–2019/20
- Brian Mallinson, 1971/72
- Lwando Manase, 2003/04–2004/05
- Claude Mandy, 1931/32
- George Mandy, 1933/34–1947/48
- Marco Marais, 2009/10–2018/19
- CW Marsh, 1920/21 (Note: Marsh played in two first–class matches for Boland in the 1920/21 season. No biographical details are known.)
- Barry Marshall, 1974/75–1975/76
- Kenneth Marshall, 1963/64–1967/68
- Lazola Masingatha, 2006/07–2009/10
- Michael Matika, 2001/02–2005/06
- Mzuvukile Matomela, 1998/99–2001/02
- Bradley Mauer, 2017/18–2019/20
- Lundi Mbane, 2001/02–2015/16
- Loyiso Mdashe, 2006/07–2016/17
- Philip Melville, 1926/27
- Aviwe Mgijima, 2003/04–2007/08
- Alindile Mhletywa, 2019/20
- Eric Miles, 1920/21–1929/30
- Lawrence Miles, 1913/14–1933/34
- R Miller, 1936/37 (Note: Miller played in one first–class match for Boland in the 1936/37 season. No biographical details are known.)
- Ian Milne, 1957/58
- Gordon Minkley, 1962/63–1970/71
- Harold Minkley, 1950/51
- Norman Minnaar, 1982/83–1986/87
- Ian Mitchell, 1994/95–2002/03
- Neil Mitchell, 1954/55
- Sinethemba Mjekula, 2010/11
- Avumile Mnci, 2008/09–2017/18
- Akhona Mnyaka, 2012/13–2017/18
- Thandolwethu Mnyaka, 2010/11–2016/17
- Luthando Mnyanda, 2004/05–2011/12
- Leslie Mobbs, 1958/59
- Raymond Morkel, 1935/36–1939/40
- Roger Moult, 1988/89–1989/90
- James Muir, 1926/27 (Note: Muir played in two first–class matches for Boland in the 1926/27 season. No biographical details are known.)
- John Mullen, 1910/11 (Note: Mullen played in three first–class matches for Boland in the 1910/11 season. No biographical details are known.)
- John Muller, 1959/60
- Leslie Muller, 1963/64
- IB Murray, 1920/21 (Note: Murray played in two first–class matches for Boland in the 1920/21 season. No biographical details are known.)
- Arthur Murrell, 1910/11–1913/14
- Jack Muzzell, 1928/29–1934/35
- Peter Muzzell, 1957/58–1969/70
- Ayavuya Myoli, 2008/09–2012/13

== N ==
- Tsepo Ndwandwa, 2015/16–2017/18
- Brian Ndzundzu, 1993/94–1995/96
- Frederick Nel, 1955/56
- Siyabulela Nelani, 1997/98–2002/03
- Craig Nelson, 1993/94
- Gerald Nelson, 1961/62–1981/82
- Ira Neuper, 1950/51
- Lewis Newnham, 1903/04
- Sekela Ngadlela, 2014/15–2016/17
- Mfuneko Ngam, 2005/06
- Mlungisi Ngece, 1997/98–2004/05
- Collan Nicholas, 1954/55
- Jason Niemand, 2013/14–2019/20
- Desmond Niland, 1936/37–1947/48
- Arthur Norton, 1909/10
- Norman Norton, 1906/07–1910/11
- David Nosworthy, 1991/92–1995/96
- Jerry Nqolo, 2006/07–2018/19
- Makhaya Ntini, 1994/95–2003/04
- Sinovuyo Ntuntwana, 2010/11–2019/20

== O ==
- John Ogilvie, 1976/77
- Yamkela Oliphant, 2009/10–2017/18
- Mario Olivier, 2005/06–2008/09
- Rodney Ontong, 1972/73–1984/85
- Roelof Oosthuizen, 1913/14
- Graeme Ortlieb, 1995/96
- Bradley Osborne, 1979/80–1994/95
- Timothy Overton, 1966/67

== P ==
- Steve Palframan, 1991/92–1996/97
- Lucky Pangabantu, 2004/05–2015/16
- Lindsay Pearson, 1982/83–1983/84
- Keith Peinke, 2001/02–2004/05
- N Perry, 1931/32 (Note: Perry played in four first–class matches for Boland in the 1931/32 season. No biographical details are known.)
- Arthur Peters, 1936/37
- Moses Pethu, 1996/97–2005/06
- Graham Pfuhl, 1981/82–1983/84
- CW Phillips, 1920/21 (Note: Phillips played in one first–class match for Boland in the 1920/21 season. No biographical details are known.)
- Dudley Phillips, 1924/25–1929/30
- Howard Phillips, 1906/07–1913/14
- Ivor Phillips, 1957/58–1958/59
- John Phillips, 1931/32–1935/36
- James Phillips, 1987/88
- Leroy Phillips, 1986/87–1989/90
- Ricey Phillips, 1939/40–1956/57
- Charles Pope, 1966/67–1979/80
- Steven Pope, 1990/91–2005/06
- Frank Porter, 1908/09
- Jacques Porter, 2019/20
- Kenneth Postman, 1979/80
- Guy Preston, 1909/10–1910/11
- Donnie Preston, 1946/47–1947/48
- Denham Price, 1964/65
- Justin Price, 1994/95
- Murray Price, 1955/56–1965/66
- Charles Prince, 1897/98–1898/99
- Andrew Pringle, 2002/03–2003/04
- William Pringle, 1902/03
- Henry Prior, 1928/29
- Henry Promnitz, 1924/25–1927/28

== Q ==
- Sinethemba Qeshile, 2014/15–2019/20

== R ==
- Victor Radloff, 1992/93
- William Radloff, 1988/89–1992/93
- Romano Ramoo, 2000/01–2013/14
- Darryn Randall, 2009/10
- Ronnie Randell, 1906/07–1925/26
- RN Randell, 1902/03 (Note: Randell played in three first–class matches for Boland in the 1902/03 season. No biographical details are known.)
- Murray Ranger, 1998/99–2009/10
- Raymond Ranger, 1975/76–1985/86
- Lilitha Reed, 2019/20
- Bernard Reid, 1934/35–1936/37
- Seymour Reid, 1946/47–1947/48
- Wilhelm Rein, 1947/48
- Paul Reynolds, 1957/58
- Rowan Richards, 2005/06
- Matthew Richardson, 2005/06–2009/10
- Reginald Richter, 1933/34–1939/40
- Theophilus Riemer, 1897/98
- Warne Rippon, 1987/88
- Anthony Roberts, 1989/90–1990/91
- Bruce Roberts, 1991/92
- P Roberts, 1922/23 (Note: Roberts played in one first–class match for Boland in the 1922/23 season. No biographical details are known.)
- V Roberts, 1933/34 (Note: Roberts played in two first–class matches for Boland in the 1933/34 season. No biographical details are known.)
- WE Roberts, 1910/11–1923/24 (Note: Roberts played in eight first–class matches for Boland from 1910/11 to 1923/24. No biographical details are known.)
- Lonwabo Rodolo, 2010/11–2016/17
- Nathan Roux, 2022-

== S ==
- John Sansom, 1962/63–1965/66
- Keith Sansom, 1977/78–1980/81
- Russell Sansom, 1977/78–1979/80
- Victor Schaefer, 1929/30
- Samuel Schmidt, 1973/74–1980/81
- Arrie Schoeman, 1988/89–1995/96
- Edwin Schreiber, 1954/55–1966/67
- Dirk Scott, 1978/79–1984/85
- Malcolm Scott, 1964/65–1968/69
- Walter Scott, 1923/24
- Kabelo Sekhukhune, 2016/17–2017/18
- Bennett Sekonyela, 2002/03–2004/05
- Somila Seyibokwe, 2005/06–2018/19
- R Shaw, 1920/21 (Note: Shaw played in two first–class matches for Boland in the 1920/21 season. No biographical details are known.)
- Cecil Shearman, 1920/21–1937/38
- Arthur Shingler, 1902/03–1903/04
- Peter Shuman, 1954/55
- Phil Simmons, 1992/93
- Kenneth Skelding, 1970/71
- Angus Small, 1991/92
- Charles Smith, 1929/30
- Gary Smith, 1979/80
- Michael Smith, 2001/02–2005/06
- Robert Smith, 1946/47–1950/51
- Tip Snooke, 1897/98–1908/09
- Charles Snyman, 1950/51–1953/54
- Abongile Sodumo, 2000/01–2014/15
- Kenneth Solomon, 1958/59
- Basil Southwood, 1926/27–1928/29
- Frederick Spence, 1934/35–1937/38
- Murray Spence, 2012/13 (Note: Spence played in one Twenty20 match for Boland in the 2012/13 season.)
- Carl Spilhaus, 1993/94–1995/96
- Arthur Sprenger, 1908/09–1913/14
- Alec Stander, 1997/98–2010/11
- William Steele, 1966/67–1970/71
- Daniel Stephen, 1993/94–1997/98
- David Stephen, 1972/73–1977/78
- Quentin Still, 1991/92–1996/97
- Craig Stirk, 1989/90–1990/91
- Frederick Stirton, 1906/07
- Michael Stonier, 1992/93–1995/96
- Richard Stretch, 1979/80–1981/82
- Pieter Strydom, 1992/93–2003/04
- Glenton Stuurman, 2019/20
- Elliot Style, 1910/11–1913/14
- Craig Sugden, 1998/99–2003/04
- Francis Sutton, 1902/03
- James Swallow, 1906/07–1908/09
- Malcolm Sylvester, 1971/72
- E Symons, 1906/07 (Note: Symons played in one first–class match for Boland in the 1906/07 season. No biographical details are known.)

== T ==
- Coventry Tainton, 1929/30
- Warwick Tainton, 1949/50–1961/62
- Dion Taljard, 1992/93–1999/00
- Alan Tarr, 1922/23–1923/24
- Trevor Tarr, 1951/52
- Dummy Taylor, 1947/48–1949/50
- Peter Taylor, 1959/60–1964/65
- Roy Taylor, 1969/70–1975/76
- Bryn Thomas, 1997/98–2009/10
- Greg Thomas, 1983/84–1986/87
- Gregory Thompson, 1987/88–1994/95
- N Thompson, 1980/81 (Note: Thompson played in one first–class match for Boland in the 1980/81 season. No biographical details are known.)
- Robin Thorne, 1948/49–1964/65
- Patrick Thornton, 1933/34
- Craig Thyssen, 2007/08–2012/13
- Steve Tikolo, 1995/96
- Denis Tomlinson, 1928/29
- Dexter Toppin, 1988/89–1989/90
- Michael Tramontino, 1983/84
- Wallace Treadaway, 1947/48–1949/50
- Dudley Tricker, 1963/64–1970/71
- Emmerson Trotman, 1984/85–1991/92
- Cebo Tshiki, 2003/04–2012/13

== V ==
- Yaseen Vallie, 2016/17–2019/20
- Cassie van der Merwe, 1997/98–1999/00
- Daniel van Heerden, 1974/75
- Grant van Heerden, 1992/93
- Michael van Vuuren, 1991/92–1992/93
- Gavin Victor, 1992/93–1993/94
- Bryan Voke, 2006/07–2008/09
- Gareth von Hoesslin, 2004/05–2006/07

== W ==
- Alfred Wainwright, 1906/07–1926/27
- Iain Wainwright, 1972/73–1976/77
- Charles Wakefield, 1897/98 (Note: Wakefield played in one first–class match for Boland in the 1897/98 season. No biographical details are known.)
- Charles Wakefield, 1920/21
- Bryan Wakeford, 1945/46–1949/50
- Basheeru-Deen Walters, 2018/19
- Martin Walters, 1998/99–2018/19
- Alan Ward, 1971/72
- Cecil Warner, 1929/30
- Thomas Warner, 1922/23–1929/30
- John Warren, 1897/98–1898/99
- Kenny Watson, 1972/73–1991/92
- Ray Watson-Smith, 1969/70
- Arthur Weakley, 1965/66–1980/81
- Gary Weber, 1975/76
- Charles Weir, 1897/98–1903/04
- Alan Wells, 1981/82
- Colin Wells, 1980/81
- Sidney Wewege, 1936/37–1937/38
- Brad White, 1996/97–1999/00
- Cyril White, 1929/30–1951/52
- Clive White, 1936/37
- Stanley White, 1934/35–1939/40
- JK Whitehead, 1903/04–1906/07 (Note: Whitehead played in two first–class matches for Boland in 1903/04 and 1906/07. No biographical details are known.)
- Murray Whitehead, 1929/30–1931/32 (Note: Whitehead played in five first–class matches for Boland from 1929/30 to 1931/32. No biographical details are known.)
- Denzil Whitfield, 1962/63
- Harold Whitfield, 1936/37–1953/54
- Wayne Wiblin, 1995/96–2001/02
- George Wienand, 1934/35–1953/54
- Michael Wild, 1954/55 (Note: Wild played in three first–class matches for Boland in the 1954/55 season. No biographical details are known.)
- Vernon Wild, 1962/63–1967/68
- Andrew Wilkins, 1962/63–1964/65
- Albert Wilkins, 1931/32–1934/35
- Chris Wilkins, 1962/63–1970/71
- Brandon Williams, 2006/07–2016/17
- Bradley Williams, 2016/17–2019/20
- Keith Willows, 1970/71–1972/73
- Lorrie Wilmot, 1985/86–1988/89
- Aiden Wilson, 1903/04–1906/07 (Note: Wilson played in three first–class matches for Boland from 1903/04 to 1906/07. No biographical details are known.)
- Craig Wilson, 1994/95–1997/98
- James Wilson, 1996/97–2000/01
- Kyle Wilson, 2004/05–2010/11
- William Wilson, 1956/57
- Errol Witherden, 1954/55–1958/59
- Graham Witney, 1954/55
- Rex Witte, 1933/34
- Hubert Wood, 1920/21–1924/25
- JF Wood, 1908/09–1909/10 (Note: Wood played in three first–class matches for Boland from 1908/09 to 1909/10. No biographical details are known.)
- T Wood, 1906/07 (Note: Wood played in one first–class match for Boland in the 1906/07 season. No biographical details are known.)
- Denys Woods, 1946/47–1953/54
- Neil Wrede, 1964/65–1968/69

== X ==
- Bamanye Xenxe, 2010/11–2019/20

== Y ==
- Nonelela Yikha, 2019/20
- Chase Young, 2006/07–2011/12

== Z ==
- Malwande Zamo, 2010/11–2019/20
- Trevor Ziemann, 1967/68
- Monde Zondeki, 2000/01–2004/05
