= Muzzell =

Muzzell is a surname of English origin, likely a variant of the surname Mussell. Notable people with the surname include:

- Jack Muzzell (1905-1996), South African cricketer
- Peter Muzzell (born 1939), South African former cricketer
- Robbie Muzzell (born 1945), South African former cricketer
