= Ian Lloyd =

Ian Lloyd may refer to:

- Ian Lloyd (rugby league), English rugby league footballer of the 1930s
- Sir Ian Lloyd (politician) (1921–2006), British Conservative politician
- Ian Lloyd (cricketer) (1938–2009), South African cricketer
- Ian Lloyd (musician) (born 1947), American singer
- Ian Lloyd (photographer) (born 1953), Australian photographer
