= Billy Bremner (disambiguation) =

Billy Bremner (1942–1997) was a Scottish footballer, who played for Leeds United and Scotland in the 1960s and 1970s.

Billy Bremner may also refer to:

- Billy Bremner (musician) (born 1946), Scottish guitarist
- Billy Bremner (Australian footballer) (1872–1957), Australian rules footballer

== See also ==
- Bill Bremner (1879–1961), New Zealand lawn bowls player
- William Bremner (cricketer) (1884–1961), South African cricketer
