= Siyabulela =

Siyabulela is a South African given name. Notable people with the name include:

- Siyabulela Xuza (born 1989), South African scientist, energy-engineering expert, and entrepreneur
- Siyabulela Shai (born 1993), South African soccer player
- Siyabulela Nelani (born 1979), South African cricketer
