= Ernest Holmes (disambiguation) =

Ernest Holmes may refer to:

- Ernest Holmes (priest) (1854-1931), eminent Anglican priest and author
- Ernest Holmes Sr. (1883-1945), inventor of the tow truck
- Ernest Holmes (1887-1960), American New Thought writer, teacher, and leader
- Ernest Holmes (footballer) (fl. 1919-1921), see List of Bury F.C. players (1–24 appearances)
- Ernest Holmes (cricketer) (1918-1987), South African cricketer

== See also ==
- Ernie Holmes (Earnest Lee Holmes 1948-2008), American football player
