= Neil Mitchell =

Neil Mitchell may refer to:

- Neil Mitchell (cricketer) (born 1936), South African cricketer
- Neil Mitchell (musician) (born 1965), Scottish musician
- Neil Mitchell (footballer) (born 1974), English former professional footballer
- Neil Mitchell (radio presenter) (born 1951), Australian radio presenter
