= William Ayres =

William Ayres may refer to:

- William Ayres (cricketer) (1906–1978), South African cricketer
- William Augustus Ayres (1867–1952), Democratic member of the U.S. House of Representatives from Kansas
- William Hanes Ayres (1916–2000), Republican member of the U.S. House of Representatives from Ohio
- William Orville Ayres (1817–1887), American physician and ichthyologist
- Bill Ayers (born 1944), American professor and former radical
