= Gordon Cross =

Gordon Cross may refer to:

- Gordon Cross (cricketer), South African cricketer
- Gordon B. Cross, American professor and academic administrator

== See also ==
- Gordon Crosse, English composer
