= John Beveridge =

John Beveridge may refer to:

- John Lourie Beveridge (1824–1910), governor of Illinois
- John Beveridge (cricketer) (1909–1971), South African cricketer
- John Beveridge (mayor) (1848–1916), New South Wales businessman and mayor
- John Beveridge (rower) (1936–2016), English rower
- Jack Beveridge (1907–1986), Australian rules footballer
