= Bedser =

Bedser is an English surname. Notable people with the surname include:

- Sir Alec Bedser (1918–2010), Surrey and England cricketer, twin brother of Eric
- Alec Bedser (South African cricketer) (1948–1981), South African cricketer
- Eric Bedser (1918–2006), Surrey cricketer
