= Londt =

Londt is a surname. Notable people with the surname include:

- Henry Londt (1879–1947), South African cricketer
- Ismael Londt (born 1985), Surinamese-Dutch kickboxer
- Jaco Londt (born 1984), South African politician
