= Michael Dilley =

Michael Dilley can refer to:

- Michael Dilley (English cricketer) (1939–2023), English cricketer
- Michael Dilley (South African cricketer) (born 1970), South African cricketer
