= Donald McKenna (cricketer) =

Australian cricketer

Personal information
- Full name: Donald Charles McKenna
- Born: 7 July 1944; Jarrahdale, Western Australia
- Died: 4 September 1995 (aged 51); Port Augusta, South Australia
- Batting: Left-handed
- Role: Wicket-keeper

Domestic team information
- Years: Team
- 1973/74–1979/80: Border

Career statistics
Competition	First-class	List A
Matches	35	5
Runs scored	1,754	55
Batting average	29.72	13.75
100s/50s	1/9	0/0
Top score	129*	25
Catches/stumpings	80/3	3/0
- Source: CricketArchive, 18 January 2013

Donald Charles McKenna (7 July 1944 – 4 September 1995) was an Australian cricketer who played South African domestic matches for Border from the mid-1970s to the early 1980s.

Born in Perth, Western Australia, McKenna moved to South Africa in 1971, and made his first-class debut for Border in the 1973–74 season of the Currie Cup. Usually playing as a wicket-keeper, he instead began for Border as a middle-order batsman, with the wicket-keeping position held by Charles Pope. However, for the 1974–75 season McKenna took over the keeping role for the full season. During the season, he also scored his first (and only) first-class century, against Orange Free State. In the match, Border had been dismissed for 104 in its first innings, and were 27/4 in the second innings when McKenna entered. He proceeded to score 129 not out from his team's total of 237 runs, putting on partnerships of 70 runs with Christopher Davies for the eighth wicket and 108 runs with Gregory Haynes for the ninth wicket. However, Border still lost the match by eight wickets.

McKenna remained Border's first-choice wicket-keeper for the following few seasons, including in matches in the limited-overs competition. From the 1977–78 season onwards, Border played in the newly created Castle Bowl, effectively the second division of the main Currie Cup. The following season, McKenna only played two matches, with the position of wicket-keeper again occupied by Charles Pope. He did go on to play as keeper in each of Border's matches in the 1979–80 season, which were to be his last at first-class level. Having been a steady middle-order batsman for most of his career, McKenna finished his 35-match first-class career with 1,754 runs at an average of 29.72, also taking 80 catches and three stumpings. McKenna returned to Australia in August 1980, dying in Port Augusta, South Australia, in September 1995, aged 51.
