= Ernest Birch =

Ernest Birch may refer to:

- Ernest Birch (cricketer) (1930–2006), South African cricketer
- Sir Ernest Woodford Birch (1857–1929), British colonial administrator
