= Witherden =

Witherden is a surname. Notable people with the surname include:

- Alex Witherden (born 1998), Australian rules footballer
- Errol Witherden (1922–2009), South African cricketer
- Steve Witherden (fl. 2009), British politician
- Ted Witherden (1922–2019), English cricketer
