= Norman Knight =

Norman Knight may refer to:

- G. Norman Knight (1891–1978), British barrister
- Norman L. Knight (1895–1972), American chemist and writer
- Norman Knight (English cricketer) (1914–2009), English cricketer and colonial administrator
- Norman Knight (South African cricketer) (1946–2010), South African cricketer
