= Kenneth Marshall (disambiguation) =

Kenneth Marshall (born 1950), is an American actor

Kenneth Marshall may also refer to:

- Kenneth Marshall (cricketer) (1935–2024), South African cricketer
- Kenneth Marshall (politician) (born 1968), American politician
- Kenneth Walker Marshall (1911–1992), Scottish international rugby and cricket player
- Ken "Hiwatt" Marshall, Canadian producer who collaborated with cEvin Key on the album The Dragon Experience
- Kenneth Marshall, a fictional politician in the 2025 film Mickey 17

== See also ==
- Ken Marschall (born 1950), American painter
