= Dudley Bowen =

Dudley Bowen may refer to:

- Dudley Bowen (cricketer) (1903–1972), South African cricketer
- Dudley Hollingsworth Bowen Jr. (born 1941), United States district judge
