= Justin Price =

Justin Price may refer to:

- Justin Price (cricketer) (born 1972), South African cricketer
- Justin Jesse Price (1930–2011), American mathematician
- Justin K. Price (born 1964), member of the Rhode Island House of Representatives
