= Ken Griffiths =

Ken or Kenneth Griffiths may refer to:

- Kenneth Griffith (Kenneth Griffiths, 1921–2006), British actor
- Ken Griffiths (footballer) (1930–2008), English footballer
- Ken Griffiths (photographer) (1945–2014), New Zealand-born British photographer

== See also ==
- Ken Griffith (1918–2005), American basketball player
- Kenneth Griffith (cricketer) (1935–2026), South African cricketer
