= John Lawrence (cricketer) =

South African cricketer (born 1957)

Personal information
- Born: 23 November 1957 (age 68); East London, South Africa
- Source: Cricinfo, 6 December 2020

John Lawrence (born 23 November 1957) is a South African cricketer. He played in one List A and eight first-class matches for Border in 1981/82 and 1982/83.

== See also ==
- List of Border representative cricketers
