= Gary Weber =

South African cricketer (1952–2012)

Personal information
- Born: 24 April 1952; East London, South Africa
- Died: 7 April 2012 (aged 59); East London, South Africa
- Source: Cricinfo, 12 December 2020

Gary Weber (24 April 1952 – 7 April 2012) was a South African cricketer. He played in one first-class and one List A match for Border during the 1975/76 season.

== See also ==
- List of Border representative cricketers
