= Philip Levy (cricketer) =

South African cricketer (born 1943)

Personal information
- Born: 27 April 1943 (age 83); King William's Town, South Africa
- Source: Cricinfo, 6 December 2020

Philip Levy (born 27 April 1943) is a South African former cricketer. He played in two first-class matches for Border in 1969/70 and 1970/71.

== See also ==
- List of Border representative cricketers
