= Dudley Phillips =

South African cricketer

Personal information
- Born: 7 April 1905; Cofimvaba, Cape Colony
- Died: 7 February 1953 (aged 47); Burgersdorp, South Africa
- Source: Cricinfo, 12 December 2020

Dudley Phillips (7 April 1905 – 7 February 1953) was a South African cricketer. He played in five first-class matches for Border from 1924/25 to 1930/31.

== See also ==
- List of Border representative cricketers
