= Bryan Voke =

South African cricketer (born 1984)

Personal information
- Born: 7 June 1984 (age 42); Cape Town, South Africa
- Source: Cricinfo, 12 December 2020

Bryan Voke (born 7 June 1984) is a South African cricketer. He played in eight first-class and four List A matches for Border from 2007 to 2009.

== See also ==
- List of Border representative cricketers
