= Kenneth Solomon =

South African cricketer (born 1934)

Personal information
- Born: 13 June 1934 (age 92); Johannesburg, South Africa
- Source: Cricinfo, 12 December 2020

Kenneth Solomon (born 13 June 1934) is a South African cricketer. He played in three first-class matches for Border in 1958/59.

== See also ==
- List of Border representative cricketers
