= Michael Lax (cricketer) =

South African cricketer (born 1974)

Personal information
- Born: 10 August 1974 (age 52); East London, South Africa
- Source: Cricinfo, 6 December 2020

Michael Lax (born 10 August 1974) is a South African cricketer. He played in two first-class matches for Border in 1993/94 and 1994/95.

== See also ==
- List of Border representative cricketers
