= Graham Geldenhuys =

South African cricketer (born 1959)

Personal information
- Born: 6 November 1959 (age 67); East London, South Africa
- Source: Cricinfo, 6 December 2020

Graham Geldenhuys (born 6 November 1959) is a South African cricketer. He played in one first-class match for Border in 1984/85.

== See also ==
- List of Border representative cricketers
