= Liam Graham (cricketer) =

South African cricketer (born 1976)

Personal information
- Born: 16 March 1976 (age 50); Johannesburg, South Africa
- Source: Cricinfo, 6 December 2020

Liam Graham (born 16 March 1976) is a South African cricketer. He played in 4 first-class and 27 List A matches for Border from 2000 to 2004.

== See also ==
- List of Border representative cricketers
