= Charles Johnson (cricketer) =

South African cricketer

Personal information
- Died: 11 July 1967; Brakpan, South Africa
- Source: Cricinfo, 6 December 2020

Charles Johnson (died 11 July 1967) was a South African cricketer. He played in seventeen first-class matches for Border from 1906/07 to 1920/21.

== See also ==
- List of Border representative cricketers
