= Vernon Wild =

South African cricketer (born 1939)

Personal information
- Born: 9 August 1939 (age 87); East London, South Africa
- Source: Cricinfo, 12 December 2020

Vernon Wild (born 9 August 1939) is a South African cricketer. He played in nineteen first-class matches for Border from 1962/63 to 1967/68.

== See also ==
- List of Border representative cricketers
