= William Steele (cricketer) =

South African cricketer (born 1946)

Personal information
- Born: 7 March 1946 (age 80); Queenstown, South Africa
- Source: Cricinfo, 12 December 2020

William Steele (born 7 March 1946) is a South African former cricketer. He played in sixteen first-class matches for Border from 1966/67 to 1970/71.

== See also ==
- List of Border representative cricketers
