= Michael Griffith (cricketer) =

South African cricketer (1933–2018)

Personal information
- Full name: Michael Henry Griffith
- Born: 6 September 1933; Johannesburg, South Africa
- Died: 9 November 2018 (aged 85)
- Batting: Right-handed
- Bowling: Right-arm off-break

Domestic team information
- Years: Team
- 1957/58–1964/65: Border
- Source: Cricinfo, 6 December 2020

Michael Henry Griffith (6 September 1933 – 9 November 2018) was a South African cricketer. He played in 26 first-class matches for Border from 1957/58 to 1964/65.

== See also ==
- List of Border representative cricketers
