= Bryn Thomas (cricketer) =

South African cricketer (born 1979)

Personal information
- Born: 19 August 1979 (age 47); Durban, South Africa
- Source: Cricinfo, 12 December 2020

Bryn Thomas (born 19 August 1979) is a South African cricketer. He played in thirteen first-class and twelve List A matches for Border in 2009 and 2010.

== See also ==
- List of Border representative cricketers
