= James Swallow (cricketer) =

South African cricketer

Personal information
- Born: 1878; Uitenhage, Cape Colony
- Died: 17 November 1916 (aged 37–38); Cape Town, South Africa
- Source: Cricinfo, 12 December 2020

James Swallow (1878 – 17 November 1916) was a Cape Colony cricketer. He played in three first-class matches for Border from 1906/07 to 1908/09. He was killed in action during World War I.

== See also ==
- List of Border representative cricketers
