= Allan Berry =

South African cricketer

Personal information
- Born: 6 November 1902; Palmietfontein, South Africa
- Died: 17 September 1974 (aged 71); East London, South Africa
- Source: Cricinfo, 6 December 2020

Allan Berry (6 November 1902 – 17 September 1974) was a South African cricketer. He played in four first-class matches for Border in 1925/26 and 1926/27.

== See also ==
- List of Border representative cricketers
