= William Radloff =

South African cricketer (born 1963)

Personal information
- Born: 20 May 1963 (age 63); East London, South Africa
- Source: Cricinfo, 12 December 2020

William Radloff (born 20 May 1963) is a South African cricketer. He played in three first-class and two List A matches for Border from 1988/89 to 1992/93.

== See also ==
- List of Border representative cricketers
