= Trevor Dennison =

South African cricketer (born 1956)

Personal information
- Born: 31 December 1956 (age 69); Cape Town, South Africa
- Source: Cricinfo, 6 December 2020

Trevor Dennison (born 31 December 1956) is a South African cricketer.

== Career ==
He played in one List A match for Border in 1977/78.

== See also ==
- List of Border representative cricketers
