= Thomas Hardiman (cricketer) =

South African cricketer (born 1964)

Personal information
- Born: 2 July 1964 (age 62); Bethlehem, South Africa
- Source: Cricinfo, 6 December 2020

Thomas Hardiman (born 2 July 1964) is a South African cricketer. He played in seven first-class matches for Border in 1985/86 and 1986/87.

== See also ==
- List of Border representative cricketers
