= William Griffith (cricketer) =

South African cricketer

Personal information
- Born: 22 January 1871; King William's Town, Cape Colony
- Died: 14 May 1948 (aged 77); Cape Town, South Africa
- Source: Cricinfo, 6 December 2020

William Griffith (22 January 1871 – 14 May 1948) was a Cape Colony-South African cricketer. He played in two first-class matches for Border in 1902/03.

== See also ==
- List of Border representative cricketers
