= Hugh Francois =

South African cricketer

Personal information
- Born: 14 November 1904; Tsolo, Cape Colony
- Died: 17 July 1982 (aged 77); Johannesburg, South Africa
- Source: Cricinfo, 6 December 2020

Hugh Francois (14 November 1904 – 17 July 1982) was a South African cricketer. He played in sixteen first-class matches for Border from 1923/24 to 1927/28.

== See also ==
- List of Border representative cricketers
