= Keith Johnson (cricketer) =

South African cricketer (born 1935)

Personal information
- Born: 10 August 1935 (age 91); East London, South Africa
- Source: Cricinfo, 6 December 2020

Keith Johnson (born 10 August 1935) is a South African cricketer. He played in ten first-class matches for Border from 1955/56 to 1958/59.

== See also ==
- List of Border representative cricketers
