= Rowan Harmuth =

South African cricketer (born 1948)

Personal information
- Born: 4 November 1948 (age 78); East London, South Africa
- Source: Cricinfo, 6 December 2020

Rowan Harmuth (born 4 November 1948) is a South African cricketer. He played in one List A and three first-class matches for Border in 1971/72 and 1972/73.

== See also ==
- List of Border representative cricketers
