= Guy Preston =

South African cricketer (1884–1947)

Personal information
- Born: June 1884; Uitenhage, Cape Colony
- Died: 17 January 1947; Bathurst, South Africa
- Source: Cricinfo, 12 December 2020

Guy Preston (June 1884 – 17 January 1947) was a South African cricketer. He played in five first-class matches for Border in 1909/10 and 1910/11.

== See also ==
- List of Border representative cricketers
