= Moses Pethu =

South African cricketer (born 1984)

Personal information
- Born: 23 January 1984 (age 42); East London, South Africa
- Source: Cricinfo, 12 December 2020

Moses Pethu (born 23 January 1984) is a South African cricketer. He played in two first-class and two List A matches for Border in 2006.

== See also ==
- List of Border representative cricketers
