= Timothy Overton =

South African cricketer (born 1944)

Personal information
- Born: 6 May 1944 (age 82); Stellenbosch, South Africa
- Source: Cricinfo, 12 December 2020

Timothy Overton (born 6 May 1944) is a South African former cricketer. He played in four first-class matches for Border in 1966/67.

== See also ==
- List of Border representative cricketers
