= Bryan Wakeford =

South African cricketer (1929–2006)

Personal information
- Born: 12 February 1929; Lady Grey, South Africa
- Died: 13 November 2006 (aged 77); Queenstown, South Africa
- Source: Cricinfo, 12 December 2020

Bryan Wakeford (12 February 1929 – 13 November 2006) was a South African cricketer. He played in five first-class matches for Border from 1947/48 to 1949/50.

== See also ==
- List of Border representative cricketers
