= Russell Sansom =

South African cricketer (1956–2021)

Personal information
- Full name: Russell Albert Sansom
- Born: 27 September 1956; East London, South Africa
- Died: 25 February 2021 (aged 64)
- Batting: Right-handed

Domestic team information
- Years: Team
- 1977/78–1978/79: Border
- Source: Cricinfo, 12 December 2020

Russell Albert Sansom (27 September 1956 – 25 February 2021) was a South African cricketer. He played in one List A and three first-class matches for Border in 1977/78 and 1978/79.

== See also ==
- List of Border representative cricketers
