= Gary Boucher =

South African cricketer (born 1953)

Personal information
- Born: 3 November 1953 (age 73); King William's Town, South Africa
- Source: Cricinfo, 6 December 2020

Gary Boucher (born 3 November 1953) is a South African former cricketer. He played in twenty-five first-class and six List A matches for Border from 1976/77 to 1981/82.

== See also ==
- List of Border representative cricketers
