= Edward Hartigan =

South African cricketer (1877–1962)

Personal information
- Born: 1877; East London, Cape Colony
- Died: 1962 (aged 84–85); East London, South Africa
- Source: Cricinfo, 6 December 2020

Edward Hartigan (1877–1962) was a professional South African cricketer. He played in nine first-class matches for Border from 1902/1903 to 1926/1927.

== See also ==
- List of Border representative cricketers
