= Sonwabile Fassi =

South African cricketer (born 1991)

Personal information
- Born: 14 March 1991 (age 35); Mdantsane, South Africa
- Source: Cricinfo, 6 December 2020

Sonwabile Fassi (born 14 March 1991) is a South African former cricketer. He played in one Twenty20 match for Border in 2011.

== See also ==
- List of Border representative cricketers
