= Murray Price =

South African cricketer (1935–2016)

Personal information
- Full name: James Murray Grant Price
- Born: 31 August 1935; Queenstown, South Africa
- Died: 6 June 2016 (aged 80); East London, South Africa
- Source: Cricinfo, 12 December 2020

Murray Price (31 August 1935 – 6 June 2016) was a South African cricketer. He played in 28 first-class matches for Border from 1955/56 to 1965/66. Aside from cricket, he also ran a stud farm.

== See also ==
- List of Border representative cricketers
