= Keith Willows =

South African cricketer (born 1951)

Personal information
- Born: 29 April 1951 (age 75); East London, South Africa
- Source: Cricinfo, 12 December 2020

Keith Willows (born 29 April 1951) is a South African cricketer. He played in three first-class matches for Border from 1970/71 to 1972/73.

== See also ==
- List of Border representative cricketers
