= Donald Kemp =

South African cricketer (1929–1981)

Personal information
- Born: 17 June 1929; Cathcart, South Africa
- Died: 17 July 1981 (aged 52); Middelburg, South Africa
- Source: Cricinfo, 6 December 2020

Donald Kemp (17 June 1929 – 17 July 1981) was a South African cricketer. He played in nine first-class matches for Border from 1951/52 to 1955/56.

== See also ==
- List of Border representative cricketers
