= Peter Heger =

South African cricketer (born 1942)

Personal information
- Born: 3 June 1942 (age 84); East London, South Africa
- Source: Cricinfo, 6 December 2020

Peter Heger (born 3 June 1942) is a South African cricketer. He played in 21 first-class and 2 List A matches for Border from 1963/64 to 1971/72.

== See also ==
- List of Border representative cricketers
