= Richard Kent (cricketer) =

South African cricketer (born 1950)

Personal information
- Born: 12 September 1950 (age 76); Kokstad, South Africa
- Source: Cricinfo, 6 December 2020

Richard Kent (born 12 September 1950) is a South African cricketer. He played in 33 first-class and 9 List A matches for Border from 1974/75 to 1982/83.

== See also ==
- List of Border representative cricketers
