= George Hammond (cricketer) =

South African cricketer (born 1976)

Personal information
- Born: 27 March 1976 (age 50); Vryburg, South Africa
- Source: Cricinfo, 6 December 2020

George Hammond (born 27 March 1976) is a South African cricketer. He played in three first-class and six List A matches for Border in 1997/98 and 1998/99.

== See also ==
- List of Border representative cricketers
