= Keith Peinke =

South African cricketer (born 1983)

Personal information
- Born: 30 May 1983 (age 43); East London, South Africa
- Source: Cricinfo, 12 December 2020

Keith Peinke (born 30 May 1983) is a South African cricketer. He played in one first-class and four List A matches for Border in 2004 and 2005.

== See also ==
- List of Border representative cricketers
