= Tom Broster =

South African cricketer (1878–1942)

Personal information
- Born: 6 October 1878; Wrexham, Wales
- Died: 19 May 1942 (aged 63)
- Source: Cricinfo, 6 December 2020

Tom Broster (6 October 1878 – 19 May 1942) was a Cape Colony cricketer. He played in two first-class matches for Border in 1902/03.

== See also ==
- List of Border representative cricketers
