= Lucky Pangabantu =

South African cricketer (born 1981)

Personal information
- Full name: Yanda Pangabantu
- Born: 8 April 1981 (age 45); King William's Town, South Africa
- Source: Cricinfo, 12 December 2020

Lucky Pangabantu (born 8 April 1981) is a South African former cricketer. He played in 81 first-class, 57 List A, and 14 Twenty20 matches for Border from 2004 to 2016.

== See also ==
- List of Border representative cricketers
