= Seymour Reid (cricketer) =

South African cricketer (1914–2004)

Personal information
- Born: 12 July 1914; Cambridge, South Africa
- Died: 13 January 2004 (aged 89); Rondebosch, South Africa
- Source: Cricinfo, 12 December 2020

Seymour Reid (12 July 1914 – 13 January 2004) was a South African cricketer. He played in five first-class matches for Border in 1946/47 and 1947/48.

== See also ==
- List of Border representative cricketers
