= Maurice Adey =

South African cricketer (1917–1998)

Personal information
- Born: 26 August 1917; Tsomo, South Africa
- Died: 28 June 1998 (aged 80); Scottburgh, South Africa
- Source: Cricinfo, 6 December 2020

Maurice Adey (26 August 1917 – 28 June 1998) was a South African cricketer. He played in seven first-class matches for Border in 1946/47 and 1947/48.

== See also ==
- List of Border representative cricketers
