= Kyle Wilson (cricketer) =

South African cricketer (born 1989)

Personal information
- Full name: Kyle Wilson
- Born: 9 June 1989 (age 37); Worcester, South Africa
- Source: Cricinfo, 12 December 2020

Kyle Wilson (born 9 June 1989) is a South African former cricketer. He played in five first-class and four List A matches for Border in 2010.

== See also ==
- List of Border representative cricketers
