= Thomas Baillie (cricketer) =

South African cricketer (1868–1934)

Personal information
- Born: 10 March 1868; Sunderland, England
- Died: 20 November 1934 (aged 66); Queenstown, South Africa
- Source: Cricinfo, 6 December 2020

Thomas Baillie (10 March 1868 – 20 November 1934) was a South African cricketer. He played in one first-class match for Border in 1897/98.

== See also ==
- List of Border representative cricketers
