= Lazola Masingatha =

South African cricketer (1984–2016)

Personal information
- Born: 26 February 1984; King William's Town, South Africa
- Died: 29 April 2016 (aged 32)
- Batting: Right-handed

Domestic team information
- Years: Team
- 2006/07–2009/10: Border
- Source: Cricinfo, 12 December 2020

Lazola Masingatha (26 February 1984 – 29 April 2016) was a South African cricketer. He played in thirteen first-class and twelve List A matches for Border from 2007 to 2009.

Masingatha died following a road accident in Breidbach, aged 32.

== See also ==
- List of Border representative cricketers
