= Nathaniel Kaschula =

South African cricketer (born 1947)

Personal information
- Born: 22 March 1947 (age 79); Komga, South Africa
- Source: Cricinfo, 6 December 2020

Nathaniel Kaschula (born 22 March 1947) is a South African cricketer. He played in one first-class match for Border in 1976/77.

== See also ==
- List of Border representative cricketers
