= Stanley Francois =

South African cricketer (1899–1955)

Personal information
- Born: 8 April 1899; Lusikisiki, Cape Colony
- Died: 20 July 1955 (aged 56); Warner Beach, South Africa
- Source: Cricinfo, 6 December 2020

Stanley Francois (8 April 1899 – 20 July 1955) was a South African cricketer. He played in five first-class matches for Border in 1923/24.

== See also ==
- List of Border representative cricketers
