= Erik Emslie =

South African cricketer (born 1965)

Personal information
- Born: 17 June 1965 (age 61); Grahamstown, South Africa
- Source: Cricinfo, 6 December 2020

Erik Emslie (born 17 June 1965) is a South African former cricketer. He played in two first-class and four List A matches for Border from 1989–90 to 1991–92.

== See also ==
- List of Border representative cricketers
