= Jeftha Fetting =

South African cricketer (born 1943)

Personal information
- Born: 13 February 1943 (age 83); Middledrift, South Africa
- Source: Cricinfo, 6 December 2020

Jeftha Fetting (born 13 February 1943) is a South African cricketer. He played in three List A and eighteen first-class matches for Border from 1962/63 to 1977/78.

== See also ==
- List of Border representative cricketers
