= Newton Jarman =

South African cricketer (1886–1947)

Personal information
- Born: 10 September 1886; King William's Town, Cape Colony
- Died: 23 January 1947 (aged 60); East London, South Africa
- Source: Cricinfo, 6 December 2020

Newton Jarman (10 September 1886 – 23 January 1947) was a South African cricketer. He played in six first-class matches for Border in 1910/11.

== See also ==
- List of Border representative cricketers
