= Stanley Bayly =

South African cricketer (1868–1937)

Personal information
- Born: 7 February 1868; King William's Town, Cape Colony
- Died: 16 June 1937 (aged 69); East London, South Africa
- Source: Cricinfo, 6 December 2020

Stanley Bayly (7 February 1868 – 16 June 1937) was a South African cricketer. He played in three first-class match for Border in 1897/98.

== See also ==
- List of Border representative cricketers
