= Ian Harty (cricketer) =

South African cricketer (born 1941)

Personal information
- Born: 7 May 1941 (age 85); East London, South Africa
- Source: Cricinfo, 6 December 2020

Ian Harty (born 7 May 1941) is a South African cricketer. He played in 52 first-class and 9 List A matches for Border from 1964/65 to 1981/82.

== See also ==
- List of Border representative cricketers
