= Robert Smith (South African cricketer) =

South African cricketer (1923–2001)

Personal information
- Born: 5 January 1923; Keiskammahoek, South Africa
- Died: 26 February 2001 (aged 78); Johannesburg, South Africa
- Source: Cricinfo, 12 December 2020

Robert Smith (5 January 1923 – 26 February 2001) was a South African cricketer. He played in four first-class matches for Border from 1946/47 to 1950/51.

== See also ==
- List of Border representative cricketers
