= Ivan Busse =

South African cricketer (1914–2011)

Personal information
- Born: 18 July 1914; King William's Town, South Africa
- Died: 16 January 2011 (aged 96); King William's Town, South Africa
- Source: Cricinfo, 6 December 2020

Ivan Busse (18 July 1914 – 16 January 2011), was a South African cricketer. He played in three first-class matches for Border from 1931/32 to 1946/47.

== See also ==
- List of Border representative cricketers
