= Graeme Ortlieb =

South African cricketer (born 1970)

Personal information
- Born: 23 March 1970 (age 56); Windhoek, Namibia
- Source: Cricinfo, 12 December 2020

Graeme Ortlieb (born 23 March 1970) is a South African cricketer. He played in one first-class match for Border in 1995/96.

== See also ==
- List of Border representative cricketers
