= Leslie Mobbs =

South African cricketer (1926–2005)

Personal information
- Born: 8 May 1926; East London, South Africa
- Died: 20 August 2005 (aged 79); East London, South Africa
- Source: Cricinfo, 12 December 2020

Leslie Mobbs (8 May 1926 – 20 August 2005) was a South African cricketer. He played in one first-class match for Border in 1958/59.

== See also ==
- List of Border representative cricketers
