= Percival Hubbard =

South African cricketer

Personal information
- Full name: Percival Sinclair Hubbard
- Born: 1 April 1905; Grahamstown, Cape Colony
- Died: 1981 (aged 75–76); East London, South Africa
- Source: Cricinfo, 6 December 2020

Percival Hubbard (1 April 1905 – 1981) was a South African cricketer. He played in 28 first-class matches for Border from 1929/30 to 1946/47.

== See also ==
- List of Border representative cricketers
