= Raymond Beesly =

South African cricketer (1916–1997)

Personal information
- Born: 10 July 1916; Leicester, England
- Died: 7 December 1997 (aged 81); East London, South Africa
- Source: Cricinfo, 6 December 2020

Raymond Beesly (10 July 1916 – 7 December 1997) was a South African cricketer. He played in 27 first-class matches for Border from 1938/39 to 1953/54.

== See also ==
- List of Border representative cricketers
