= Kevin Farr =

South African cricketer (1951–2011)

Personal information
- Born: 19 March 1951; East London, South Africa
- Died: 21 May 2011 (aged 60); East London, South Africa
- Source: Cricinfo, 6 December 2020

Kevin Farr (19 March 1951 – 21 May 2011) was a South African cricketer. He played in one List A and two first-class matches for Border in 1975/76 and 1976/77.

== See also ==
- List of Border representative cricketers
