= Frederick Stirton =

South African cricketer

Personal information
- Born: 20 July 1883; Queenstown, Cape Colony
- Died: 30 July 1935 (aged 52); Johannesburg, South Africa
- Source: Cricinfo, 12 December 2020

Frederick Stirton (20 July 1883 – 30 July 1935) was a Cape Colony cricketer. He played in one first-class match for Border in 1906/07.

== See also ==
- List of Border representative cricketers
