= Raymond Bowen =

South African cricketer (1906–68)

Personal information
- Born: 16 June 1906; East London, South Africa
- Died: 29 May 1968 (aged 61); East London, South Africa
- Source: Cricinfo, 6 December 2020

Raymond Bowen (16 June 1906 – 29 May 1968) was a South African cricketer. He played in twenty-one first-class matches for Border from 1925/26 to 1934/35.

== See also ==
- List of Border representative cricketers
