= Ronald Elliot-Wilson =

South African cricketer

Personal information
- Born: 17 April 1907; Katbosfontein, South Africa
- Died: 5 July 1954 (aged 47); King William's Town, South Africa
- Source: Cricinfo, 6 December 2020

Ronald Elliot-Wilson (17 April 1907 – 5 July 1954) was a South African cricketer. He played in four first-class matches for Border from 1928/29 to 1934/35.

== See also ==
- List of Border representative cricketers
