= Gerald Nelson =

South African cricketer (born 1941)

Personal information
- Born: 14 November 1941 (age 84); Umtata, South Africa
- Source: Cricinfo, 12 December 2020

Gerald Nelson (born 14 November 1941) is a South African former cricketer. He played in 59 first-class and 7 List A matches for Border from 1961/62 to 1981/82.

== See also ==
- List of Border representative cricketers
