= Ian Milne (cricketer) =

South African cricketer (born 1935)

Personal information
- Born: 26 November 1935 (age 90); Blaney, South Africa
- Source: Cricinfo, 12 December 2020

Ian Milne (born 26 November 1935) is a South African cricketer. He played in one first-class match for Border in 1957/58.

== See also ==
- List of Border representative cricketers
