= Warwick Hinkel =

South African cricketer (born 1981)

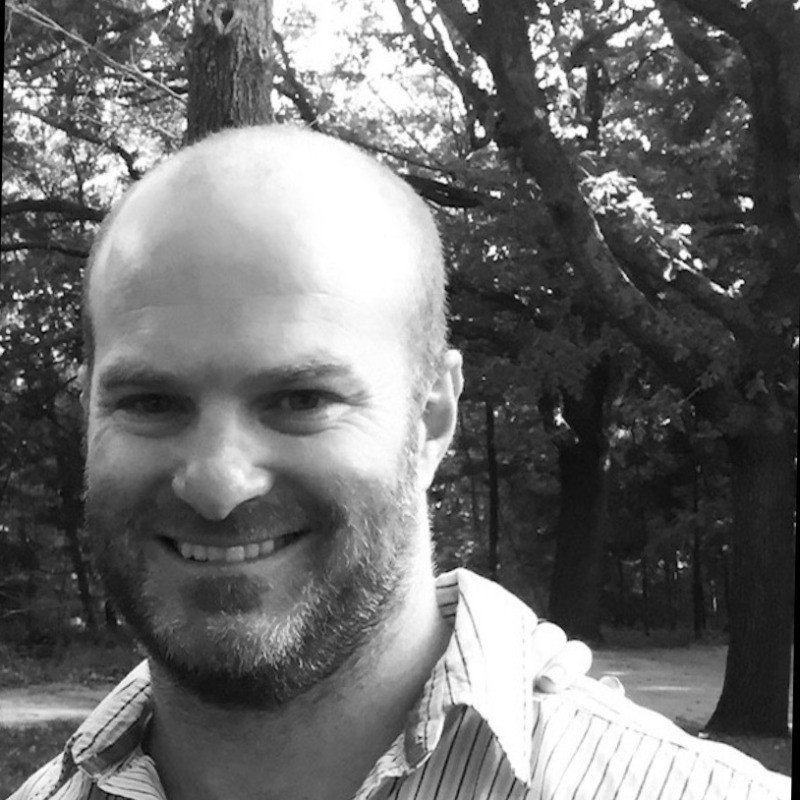

Personal information
- Full name: Warwick Robert Hinkel
- Born: 18 June 1981 (age 45); East London, South Africa
- Batting: Right-handed
- Bowling: Leg break
- Role: All-rounder

Domestic team information
- Years: Team
- 2001–2007: Border

Career statistics
Competition	First-class
Matches	17
Runs scored	564
Batting average	24.52
100s/50s	1/2
Top score	100
Balls bowled	2373
Wickets	48
Bowling average	26.54
5 wickets in innings	1
10 wickets in match	1
Best bowling	6/85
Catches/stumpings	9/0
- Source: Cricinfo, 6 December 2020

Warwick Robert Hinkel (born 18 June 1981) is a South African cricketer who played for Border from 2001 to 2007. A right-handed batsman and leg break bowler, he was a genuine all-rounder who contributed with both bat and ball in domestic cricket.

== Career ==
Hinkel played seventeen first-class and six List A matches for Border. In first-class cricket, he scored 564 runs at an average of 24.52, including one century and two half-centuries. His highest score of 100 demonstrated his capability as a batsman in the middle order.

With his leg spin bowling, Hinkel took 48 first-class wickets at an average of 26.54, with best figures of 6/85. He claimed one five-wicket haul and one ten-wicket match haul during his career, underlining his effectiveness as a spin bowler.

In List A cricket, Hinkel scored 103 runs at an average of 20.60 and took 6 wickets at an impressive average of 17.00, with best bowling figures of 4/31.

== See also ==
- List of Border representative cricketers
