= Michael Harper (cricketer) =

South African cricketer (born 1945)

Personal information
- Born: 16 February 1945 (age 81); East London, South Africa
- Source: Cricinfo, 6 December 2020

Michael Harper (born 16 February 1945) is a South African cricketer. He played in twenty first-class and two List A matches for Border from 1967/68 to 1976/77.

== See also ==
- List of Border representative cricketers
