= Walter Scott (South African cricketer) =

South African cricketer (1892–1963)

Personal information
- Born: 2 May 1892; Queenstown, Cape Colony
- Died: 4 September 1963 (aged 71); Eastern Cape, South Africa
- Source: Cricinfo, 12 December 2020

Walter Scott (2 May 1892 – 4 September 1963) was a South African cricketer. He played in three first-class matches for Border in 1923/24.

== See also ==
- List of Border representative cricketers
