= Dexter Toppin =

South African cricketer (born 1957)

Personal information
- Born: 10 July 1957 (age 69); Saint Philip, Barbados
- Source: Cricinfo, 12 December 2020

Dexter Toppin (born 10 July 1957) is a South African cricketer. He played in eleven first-class and four List A matches for Border in 1988/89 and 1989/90.

== See also ==
- List of Border representative cricketers
