= Shaun de Kock =

South African cricketer (born 1985)

Personal information
- Born: 7 May 1985 (age 41); East London, South Africa
- Source: Cricinfo, 6 December 2020

Shaun de Kock (born 7 May 1985) is a South African cricketer. He played in 74 first-class, 64 List A, and 14 Twenty20 matches for Border from 2004 to 2014.

== See also ==
- List of Border representative cricketers
