= Graham Fuller (cricketer) =

South African cricketer (born 1931)

Personal information
- Born: 8 September 1931 (age 95); Queenstown, South Africa
- Source: Cricinfo, 6 December 2020

Graham Fuller (born 8 September 1931) is a South African former cricketer. He played in ten first-class matches for Border in 1950/51 and 1951/52.

== See also ==
- List of Border representative cricketers
