= Paul Reynolds (cricketer) =

South African cricketer (born 1936)

Personal information
- Born: 16 May 1936 (age 90); East London, South Africa
- Source: Cricinfo, 12 December 2020

Paul Reynolds (born 16 May 1936) is a South African cricketer. He played in two first-class matches for Border in 1957/58.

== See also ==
- List of Border representative cricketers
