= Iain Wainwright =

South African cricketer (born 1949)

Personal information
- Born: 27 January 1949 (age 77); Noupoort, South Africa
- Source: Cricinfo, 12 December 2020

Iain Wainwright (born 27 January 1949) is a South African cricketer. He played in three first-class matches for Border from 1972/73 to 1976/77.

== See also ==
- List of Border representative cricketers
