= Justin Ehrke =

South African cricketer (born 1972)

Personal information
- Born: 26 March 1972 (age 54); Johannesburg, South Africa
- Source: Cricinfo, 6 December 2020

Justin Ehrke (born 26 March 1972) is a South African cricketer. He played in one List A and ten first-class matches for Border from 1993/94 to 1995/96.

== See also ==
- List of Border representative cricketers
