= Gary Gower =

South African cricketer (born 1952)

Personal information
- Born: 10 July 1952 (age 74); East London, South Africa
- Source: Cricinfo, 6 December 2020

Gary Gower (born 10 July 1952) is a South African cricketer. He played in 52 first-class and 18 List A matches for Border from 1973/74 to 1989/90.

== See also ==
- List of Border representative cricketers
