= Frederick Cheshire =

South African cricketer

Personal information
- Born: 24 September 1901; Queenstown, Cape Colony
- Died: 12 October 1956 (aged 55); East London, Eastern Cape, South Africa
- Source: Cricinfo, 6 December 2020

Frederick Cheshire (24 September 1901 – 12 October 1956) was a South African cricketer. He played in seven first-class matches for Border from 1923/24 to 1929/30.

== See also ==
- List of Border representative cricketers
