= Mzuvukile Matomela =

South African cricketer (born 1980)

Personal information
- Born: 28 April 1980 (age 46); Mdantsane, South Africa
- Source: Cricinfo, 12 December 2020

Mzuvukile Matomela (born 28 April 1980) is a South African former cricketer. He played in one first-class and one List A match for Border in 2000/01.

== See also ==
- List of Border representative cricketers
