= Eric Miles (cricketer) =

South African cricketer (1899–1982)

Personal information
- Born: 12 February 1899; Whittlesea, South Africa
- Died: 8 August 1982 (aged 83); Queenstown, South Africa
- Source: Cricinfo, 12 December 2020

Eric Miles (12 February 1899 – 8 August 1982) was a South African cricketer. He played in eleven first-class matches for Border from 1920/21 to 1929/30.

== See also ==
- List of Border representative cricketers
