= Matthew Richardson (cricketer) =

South African cricketer (born 1985)

Personal information
- Born: 6 September 1985 (age 41); Port Elizabeth, South Africa
- Source: Cricinfo, 12 December 2020

Matthew Richardson (born 6 September 1985) is a South African cricketer. He played in 13 first-class and 16 List A matches for Border from 2006 to 2009.

== See also ==
- List of Border representative cricketers
