= Michael Coetzee (cricketer) =

South African cricketer (born 1949)

Personal information
- Born: 9 September 1949 (age 77); Luanshya, Northern Rhodesia
- Source: Cricinfo, 6 December 2020

Michael Coetzee (born 9 September 1949) is a South African cricketer. He played in seven first-class matches for Border from 1968/69 to 1972/73.

== See also ==
- List of Border representative cricketers
