= Richard Chapman (cricketer) =

South African cricketer (1918–2004)

Personal information
- Born: 8 March 1918; East London, South Africa
- Died: 21 July 2004 (aged 86); Pretoria, South Africa
- Source: Cricinfo, 6 December 2020

Richard Chapman (8 March 1918 – 21 July 2004) was a South African cricketer. He played in one first-class match for Border in 1938/39.

== See also ==
- List of Border representative cricketers
