= Neil Wrede =

South African cricketer (1942–2004)

Personal information
- Born: 29 July 1942; King William's Town, South Africa
- Died: 8 May 2004 (aged 61); Bronkhorstpruit, South Africa
- Source: Cricinfo, 12 December 2020

Neil Wrede (29 July 1942 – 8 May 2004) was a South African cricketer. He played in thirteen first-class matches for Border from 1964/65 to 1968/69.

== See also ==
- List of Border representative cricketers
