= Donovan Lentz =

South African cricketer (born 1982)

Personal information
- Born: 20 July 1982 (age 44); Port Elizabeth, South Africa
- Source: Cricinfo, 6 December 2020

Donovan Lentz (born 20 July 1982) is a South African cricketer. He played in two first-class and two List A matches for Border in 2005.

== See also ==
- List of Border representative cricketers
