= Ian Key =

South African cricketer (born 1954)

Personal information
- Full name: Ian James Key
- Born: 30 July 1954 (age 72); East London, South Africa
- Source: Cricinfo, 27 June 2023

Ian James Key (born 30 July 1954) is a South African cricketer. He played in two first-class matches for Border in 1976 and 1977.

== See also ==
- List of Border representative cricketers
