= Kenneth Gordon (cricketer) =

South African cricketer (1887–1951)

Personal information
- Born: December 1887; King William's Town, Cape Colony
- Died: 27 July 1951 (aged 63); Vereeniging, South Africa
- Source: Cricinfo, 6 December 2020

Kenneth Gordon (December 1887 – 27 July 1951) was a South African cricketer. He played in one first-class match for Border in 1913/14.

== See also ==
- List of Border representative cricketers
