= Trevor Fenner =

South African cricketer (1933–2023)

Personal information
- Born: 30 November 1933; King William's Town, South Africa
- Died: 25 February 2023 (aged 89)
- Batting: Right-handed
- Bowling: Right-arm off-break

Domestic team information
- Years: Team
- 1962/63: Border
- Source: Cricinfo, 6 December 2020

Trevor Fenner (30 November 1933 – 25 February 2023) was a South African cricketer. He played in one first-class match for Border in 1962/63.

== See also ==
- List of Border representative cricketers
