= Stephen Els =

South African cricketer (born 1934)

Personal information
- Born: 26 February 1934 (age 92); Stutterheim, South Africa
- Source: Cricinfo, 6 December 2020

Stephen Els (born 26 February 1934) is a South African former cricketer. He played in two first-class matches for Border in 1957/58 and 1959/60.

== See also ==
- List of Border representative cricketers
