= Leslie Muller =

South African cricketer (born 1938)

Personal information
- Born: 30 November 1938 (age 87); East London, South Africa
- Source: Cricinfo, 12 December 2020

Leslie Muller (born 30 November 1938) is a South African cricketer. He played in one first-class match for Border in 1963/64.

== See also ==
- List of Border representative cricketers
