= Stephen Ker-Fox =

South African cricketer (born 1950)

Personal information
- Born: 28 May 1950 (age 76); East London, South Africa
- Source: Cricinfo, 6 December 2020

Stephen Ker-Fox (born 28 May 1950) is a South African cricketer. He played in two first-class matches for Border in 1980/81.

== See also ==
- List of Border representative cricketers
