= Elliot Style =

South African cricketer (1892–1926)

Personal information
- Full name: Sydney Wallis Elliot Style
- Born: April 1892; Cala, Cape Colony
- Died: 20 March 1926; King William's Town, South Africa
- Source: Cricinfo, 12 December 2020

Elliot Style (April 1892 – 20 March 1926) was a South African cricketer. He played in four first-class matches for Border from 1910/11 to 1913/14.

== See also ==
- List of Border representative cricketers
