= Dummy Taylor (cricketer) =

South African cricketer (1913–2002)

Personal information
- Full name: Daniel Vaughan Taylor
- Born: 26 August 1913; Worcester, South Africa
- Died: 27 May 2002 (aged 88); East London, South Africa
- Source: Cricinfo, 12 December 2020

Dummy Taylor (26 August 1913 – 27 May 2002) was a South African cricketer. He played in three first-class matches for Border in 1947–48.

== See also ==
- List of Border representative cricketers
