= Warwick Tainton =

South African cricketer (1930–1982)

Personal information
- Born: 19 June 1930; Kei Road, South Africa
- Died: 11 November 1982 (aged 52); Whitianga, New Zealand
- Source: Cricinfo, 12 December 2020

Warwick Tainton (19 June 1930 – 11 November 1982) was a South African cricketer. He played in twenty-three first-class matches for Border from 1949/50 to 1961/62.

== See also ==
- List of Border representative cricketers
