= Frans Bezuidenhout =

South African cricketer (born 1953)

Personal information
- Born: 5 January 1953 (age 73); East London, South Africa
- Source: Cricinfo, 6 December 2020

Frans Bezuidenhout (born 5 January 1953) is a South African cricketer. He played in one List A and six first-class matches for Border from 1974/75 to 1979/80.

== See also ==
- List of Border representative cricketers
