= Neville Hawkes =

South African cricketer (1940–1989)

Personal information
- Born: 22 April 1940; Cala, South Africa
- Died: 17 December 1989 (aged 49); East London, South Africa
- Source: Cricinfo, 6 December 2020

Neville Hawkes (22 April 1940 – 17 December 1989) was a South African cricketer. He played in six first-class matches for Border from 1960/61 to 1962/63.

== See also ==
- List of Border representative cricketers
