= Gavin Hogg =

South African cricketer (born 1955)

Personal information
- Born: 30 October 1955 (age 71); Northern Rhodesia
- Source: Cricinfo, 6 December 2020

Gavin Hogg (born 30 October 1955) is a South African cricketer. He played in one List A match for Border in 1977/78.

== See also ==
- List of Border representative cricketers
