= Peter Emslie =

South African cricketer (born 1968)

Personal information
- Born: 21 October 1968 (age 58); Grahamstown, South Africa
- Source: Cricinfo, 6 December 2020

Peter Emslie (born 21 October 1968) is a South African former cricketer. He played in 36 first-class and 34 List A matches for Border from 1993/94 to 1998/99.

== See also ==
- List of Border representative cricketers
