= Raymond Ranger =

South African cricketer (born 1957)

Personal information
- Born: 16 July 1957 (age 69); Stutterheim, South Africa
- Source: Cricinfo, 12 December 2020

Raymond Ranger (born 16 July 1957) is a South African former cricketer. He played in 29 first-class and 12 List A matches for Border from 1976/77 to 1992/93.

== See also ==
- List of Border representative cricketers
