= Kevin Deutschmann =

South African cricketer (born 1944)

Personal information
- Born: 14 May 1944 (age 82); King William's Town, South Africa
- Source: Cricinfo, 6 December 2020

Kevin Deutschmann (born 14 May 1944) is a South African former cricketer. He played in six first-class and two List A matches for Border in 1972/73 and 1973/74.

== See also ==
- List of Border representative cricketers
