= Grant van Heerden =

South African cricketer (born 1969)

Personal information
- Born: 17 October 1969 (age 57); Queenstown, South Africa
- Source: Cricinfo, 12 December 2020

Grant van Heerden (born 17 October 1969) is a South African former cricketer. He played in one List A match for Border in 1992/93.

== See also ==
- List of Border representative cricketers
