= Thomas Warner (cricketer) =

South African cricketer

Personal information
- Born: 31 August 1902; Idutywa, Cape Colony
- Died: 25 August 1987 (aged 84); Germiston, South Africa
- Source: Cricinfo, 12 December 2020

Thomas Warner (31 August 1902 – 25 August 1987) was a South African cricketer. He played in three first-class matches for Border from 1922/23 to 1929/30.

== See also ==
- List of Border representative cricketers
