= William Bertram (cricketer) =

South African cricketer

Personal information
- Born: 28 March 1883; Queenstown, Cape Colony
- Died: 31 May 1959 (aged 76); Durban, South Africa
- Source: Cricinfo, 6 December 2020

William Bertram (28 March 1883 – 31 May 1959) was a Cape Colony cricketer. He played in two first-class games for Border in 1902/03.

== See also ==
- List of Border representative cricketers
