= Miles Harvey (cricketer) =

South African cricketer (born 1946)

Personal information
- Born: 28 May 1946 (age 80); Durban, South Africa
- Source: Cricinfo, 6 December 2020

Miles Harvey (born 28 May 1946) is a South African cricketer. He played in fifteen first-class and two List A matches for Border from 1968/69 to 1972/73.

== See also ==
- List of Border representative cricketers
