= Kevin Bennett (cricketer) =

South African cricketer (born 1981)

Personal information
- Born: 9 September 1981 (age 45); East London, South Africa
- Source: Cricinfo, 6 December 2020

Kevin Bennett (born 9 September 1981) is a South African cricketer. He played in 65 first-class, 43 List A, and four Twenty20 matches for Border from 2005 to 2016. His twin brother, Bevan, also played first-class cricket.

== See also ==
- List of Border representative cricketers
