= Jeremey Drake =

South African cricketer (born 1968)

Personal information
- Born: 6 August 1968 (age 58); East London, South Africa
- Source: Cricinfo, 6 December 2020

Jeremey Drake (born 6 August 1968) is a South African cricketer. He played in one first-class match for Border in 1991/92.

== See also ==
- List of Border representative cricketers
