= Basil Southwood =

South African cricketer

Personal information
- Born: 18 May 1907; Durban, South Africa
- Died: 6 June 1953 (aged 46); Durban, South Africa
- Source: Cricinfo, 12 December 2020

Basil Southwood (18 May 1907 – 6 June 1953) was a South African cricketer. He played in five first-class matches for Border from 1926/27 to 1928/29.

== See also ==
- List of Border representative cricketers
