= Denys Woods =

South African cricketer (1920–1972)

Personal information
- Born: 12 March 1920; Ermelo, South Africa
- Died: 10 October 1972 (aged 52)
- Source: Cricinfo, 12 December 2020

Denys Woods (12 March 1920 – 10 October 1972) was a South African cricketer. He played in twenty-one first-class matches for Border from 1946/47 to 1953/54.

== See also ==
- List of Border representative cricketers
