= Robert Harper (cricketer) =

South African cricketer (born 1948)

Personal information
- Born: 2 May 1948 (age 78); East London, South Africa
- Source: Cricinfo, 6 December 2020

Robert Harper (born 2 May 1948) is a South African cricketer. He played in one List A and eight first-class matches for Border from 1968/69 to 1976/77.

== See also ==
- List of Border representative cricketers
