= William Pringle (cricketer) =

South African cricketer (1881–1966)

Personal information
- Born: 21 January 1881; Bedford, Cape Colony
- Died: 27 October 1966 (aged 85); Gonubie, South Africa
- Source: Cricinfo, 12 December 2020

William Pringle (21 January 1881 – 27 October 1966) was a South African cricketer. He played in two first-class matches for Border in 1902–03.

== See also ==
- List of Border representative cricketers
