= Alfred Wainwright (cricketer) =

South African cricketer (1883–1971)

Personal information
- Born: 6 February 1883
- Died: 4 June 1971 (aged 88); East London, South Africa
- Source: Cricinfo, 12 December 2020

Alfred Wainwright (6 February 1883 – 4 June 1971) was a South African cricketer. He played in seven first-class matches for Border from 1906/07 to 1926/27.

== See also ==
- List of Border representative cricketers
