= Henry Prior =

South African cricketer (1898–1989)

Personal information
- Born: 20 December 1898; East London, South Africa
- Died: 24 May 1989 (aged 90); East London, South Africa
- Source: Cricinfo, 12 December 2020

Henry Prior (20 December 1898 – 24 May 1989) was a South African cricketer. He played in two first-class matches for Border in 1928/29.

== See also ==
- List of Border representative cricketers
