= Noel Kirsten =

South African cricketer (1925–1986)

Personal information
- Born: 27 December 1925; King William's Town, South Africa
- Died: 30 September 1986 (aged 60); Cape Town, South Africa
- Source: Cricinfo, 6 December 2020

Noel Kirsten (27 December 1925 – 30 September 1986) was a South African cricketer. He played in eighteen first-class matches for Border from 1946/47 to 1960/61.

Four of Kirsten's sons played first-class cricket in South Africa, Peter, Andy, Gary and Paul, with Peter and Gary representing South Africa in Test cricket.

== See also ==
- List of Border representative cricketers
