= John McDonagh (cricketer) =

South African cricketer (1892–1964)

Personal information
- Born: 14 August 1892; Bedford, Cape Colony
- Died: 14 June 1964 (aged 71); Queenstown, South Africa
- Source: Cricinfo, 12 December 2020

John McDonagh (14 August 1892 – 14 June 1964) was a South African cricketer. He played in one first-class match for Border in 1913/14.

== See also ==
- List of Border representative cricketers
