= Gregory Thompson (South African cricketer) =

South African cricketer (born 1971)

Personal information
- Born: 2 January 1971 (age 55); Bloemfontein, South Africa
- Source: Cricinfo, 12 December 2020

Gregory Thompson (born 2 January 1971) is a South African cricketer. He played in eleven first-class and five List A matches for Border from 1989/90 to 1994/95.

== See also ==
- List of Border representative cricketers
