= Lucky Lwana =

South African cricketer (born 1983)

Personal information
- Full name: Lwando Lennox Lwana
- Born: 26 December 1983 (age 42); King William's Town, South Africa
- Source: Cricinfo, 6 December 2020

Lucky Lwana (born 26 December 1983) is a South African former cricketer. He played in 37 first-class and 27 List A matches for Border from 2004 to 2014.

== See also ==
- List of Border representative cricketers
