= Barry Marshall (cricketer) =

South African cricketer (born 1948)

Personal information
- Born: 7 March 1948 (age 78); Bedford, South Africa
- Source: Cricinfo, 12 December 2020

Barry Marshall (born 7 March 1948) is a South African cricketer. He played in two first-class matches for Border in 1974/75 and 1975/76.

== See also ==
- List of Border representative cricketers
