= Frederick Spence =

South African cricketer

Personal information
- Born: 10 March 1902; Queenstown, Cape Colony
- Died: 18 June 1986 (aged 84); Queenstown, South Africa
- Source: Cricinfo, 12 December 2020

Frederick Spence (10 March 1902 – 18 June 1986) was a South African cricketer. He played in nine first-class matches for Border from 1934/35 to 1937/38.

== See also ==
- List of Border representative cricketers
