= Thomas Dickerson =

South African cricketer (1889–1970)

Personal information
- Born: 22 May 1889; East London, South Africa
- Died: 2 July 1970 (aged 81); East London, South Africa
- Source: Cricinfo, 6 December 2020

Thomas Dickerson (22 May 1889 – 2 July 1970) was a South African cricketer. He played in one first-class match for Border in 1920/21.

== See also ==
- List of Border representative cricketers
