= Gareth von Hoesslin =

South African cricketer (born 1985)

Personal information
- Born: 19 April 1985 (age 41); East London, South Africa
- Source: Cricinfo, 12 December 2020

Gareth von Hoesslin (born 19 April 1985) is a South African cricketer. He played in 22 first-class and 19 List A matches for Border from 2005 to 2008.

== See also ==
- List of Border representative cricketers
