= Graham Witney =

South African cricketer (1934–2008)

Personal information
- Born: 21 April 1934; Cape Town, South Africa
- Died: 8 February 2008 (aged 73); Cape Town, South Africa
- Source: Cricinfo, 12 December 2020

Graham Witney (21 April 1934 – 8 February 2008) was a South African cricketer. He played in two first-class matches for Border in 1954/55.

== See also ==
- List of Border representative cricketers
