= Gerald Blake (cricketer) =

South African cricketer (born 1944)

Personal information
- Born: 3 March 1944 (age 82); East London, South Africa
- Source: Cricinfo, 6 December 2020

Gerald Blake (born 3 March 1944) is a South African cricketer. He played in one List A and one first-class match for Border in 1972/73.

== See also ==
- List of Border representative cricketers
