= Winston Jenkins =

South African cricketer (1912–1982)

Personal information
- Born: 1912; Pembroke, Wales
- Died: 10 May 1982 (aged 69–70); East London, South Africa
- Source: Cricinfo, 6 December 2020

Winston Jenkins (1912 – 10 May 1982) was a South African cricketer. He played in two first-class matches for Border in 1929/30.

== See also ==
- List of Border representative cricketers
