= Allan Hinton =

South African cricketer (1930–1987)

Personal information
- Born: 20 July 1930; Johannesburg, South Africa
- Died: 28 July 1987 (aged 57); Johannesburg, South Africa
- Source: Cricinfo, 6 December 2020

Allan Hinton (20 July 1930 – 28 July 1987) was a South African cricketer. He played in one first-class match for Border in 1959/60.

== See also ==
- List of Border representative cricketers
