= Ralph Cheshire =

South African cricketer (1893–1975)

Personal information
- Born: 11 September 1893; Queenstown, Cape Colony
- Died: 13 June 1975 (aged 81); East London, South Africa
- Source: Cricinfo, 6 December 2020

Ralph Cheshire (11 September 1893 – 13 June 1975) was a South African cricketer. He played in twenty-eight first-class matches for Border from 1913/14 to 1930/31.

== See also ==
- List of Border representative cricketers
