= Desmond Fenner =

South African cricketer (1929–2009)

Personal information
- Born: 27 March 1929; Peddie, South Africa
- Died: 31 August 2009 (aged 80); East London, South Africa
- Source: Cricinfo, 6 December 2020

Desmond Fenner (27 March 1929 – 31 August 2009) was a South African cricketer. He played in 52 first-class matches for Border from 1948/49 to 1966/67.

== See also ==
- List of Border representative cricketers
