= Patrick Thornton =

South African cricketer (1904–1961)

Personal information
- Born: 4 May 1904; Cape Town, Cape Colony
- Died: 1 February 1961 (aged 56); East London, South Africa
- Source: Cricinfo, 12 December 2020

Patrick Thornton (4 May 1904 – 1 February 1961) was a South African cricketer. He played in six first-class matches for Border in 1933/34.

== See also ==
- List of Border representative cricketers
