= John Laurie (cricketer) =

South African cricketer (1938–2006)

Personal information
- Born: 7 April 1938; King William's Town, South Africa
- Died: 13 May 2006 (aged 68); Cape Town, South Africa
- Source: Cricinfo, 6 December 2020

John Laurie (7 April 1938 – 13 May 2006) was a South African cricketer. He played in three first-class matches for Border in 1963/64.

== See also ==
- List of Border representative cricketers
