= Graham Pfuhl =

South African cricketer (born 1950)

Personal information
- Born: 23 August 1950 (age 76); Cape Town, South Africa
- Source: Cricinfo, 12 December 2020

Graham Pfuhl (born 23 August 1950) is a South African cricketer. He played in twelve first-class and four List A matches for Border from 1981/82 to 1983/84.

== See also ==
- List of Border representative cricketers
