= Wilfrid Kidson =

South African cricketer

Personal information
- Born: 13 March 1907; King William's Town, South Africa
- Died: 2 May 1986 (aged 79); Roodepoort, South Africa
- Source: Cricinfo, 6 December 2020

Wilfrid Kidson (13 March 1907 – 2 May 1986) was a South African cricketer. He played in five first-class matches for Border in 1931/32.

== See also ==
- List of Border representative cricketers
