= Donald Knott =

South African cricketer (born 1963)

Personal information
- Born: 11 April 1963 (age 63); East London, South Africa
- Source: Cricinfo, 6 December 2020

Donald Knott (born 11 April 1963) is a South African cricketer. He played in four List A matches for Border in 1988/89 and 1992/93.

== See also ==
- List of Border representative cricketers
