= Roy Taylor (cricketer) =

South African cricketer (born 1944)

Personal information
- Born: 13 July 1944 (age 82); Queenstown, South Africa
- Source: Cricinfo, 12 December 2020

Roy Taylor (born 13 July 1944) is a South African former cricketer. He played in 33 first-class and 5 List A matches from 1969/70 to 1975/76.

== See also ==
- List of Border representative cricketers
