= Hugo Lindenberg =

South African cricketer (born 1951)

Personal information
- Born: 25 May 1951 (age 75); Amsterdam, South Africa
- Source: Cricinfo, 6 December 2020

Hugo Lindenberg (born 25 May 1951) is a South African cricketer. He played in 31 first-class and 16 List A matches for Border from 1986/87 to 1992/93.

== See also ==
- List of Border representative cricketers
