= Dudley Tricker =

South African cricketer (1944–1998)

Personal information
- Born: 26 May 1944; Port Elizabeth, South Africa
- Died: 10 May 1998 (aged 53); Port Alfred, South Africa
- Source: Cricinfo, 12 December 2020

Dudley Tricker (26 May 1944 – 10 May 1998) was a South African cricketer. He played in nineteen first-class and two List A matches for Border from 1963/64 to 1970/71.

== See also ==
- List of Border representative cricketers
