= Leo Bradshaw =

South African cricketer (1880–1945)

Personal information
- Born: April 1880; Orange Free State, South Africa
- Died: 29 June 1945 (aged 65); Queenstown, South Africa
- Source: Cricinfo, 6 December 2020

Leo Bradshaw (April 1880 – 29 June 1945) was a South African cricketer. He played in one first-class match for Border in 1906/07.

== See also ==
- List of Border representative cricketers
