= Owen Burns (cricketer) =

South African cricketer (1911–1964)

Personal information
- Born: 28 June 1911; East London, South Africa
- Died: 16 June 1964 (aged 52); East London, South Africa
- Source: Cricinfo, 6 December 2020

Owen Burns (28 June 1911 – 16 June 1964) was a South African cricketer. He played in one first-class match for Border in 1936/37.

== See also ==
- List of Border representative cricketers
