= Kenneth Skelding =

South African cricketer (1947–2012)

Personal information
- Born: 25 March 1947; Loughton, England
- Died: 13 May 2012 (aged 65); Bellville, South Africa
- Source: Cricinfo, 12 December 2020

Kenneth Skelding (25 March 1947 – 13 May 2012) was a South African cricketer. He played in three first-class matches for Border in 1970/71.

== See also ==
- List of Border representative cricketers
