= Michael McGill =

South African cricketer (born 1945)

Personal information
- Born: 12 July 1945 (age 81); Cala, South Africa
- Source: Cricinfo, 12 December 2020

Michael McGill (born 12 July 1945) is a South African cricketer. He played in seven first-class matches for Border from 1975/76 to 1979/80.

== See also ==
- List of Border representative cricketers
