= Trevor Ziemann =

South African cricketer (born 1945)

Personal information
- Born: 15 August 1945 (age 81); East London, South Africa
- Source: Cricinfo, 12 December 2020

Trevor Ziemann (born 15 August 1945) is a South African cricketer. He played in six first-class matches for Border in 1967/68.

== See also ==
- List of Border representative cricketers
