= Trevor Geach =

South African cricketer (1928–1996)

Personal information
- Born: 14 August 1928; Kei Road, South Africa
- Died: 18 June 1996 (aged 67)
- Source: Cricinfo, 6 December 2020

Trevor Geach (14 August 1928 – 18 June 1996) was a South African cricketer. He played in eleven first-class matches for Border from 1954/55 to 1956/57.

== See also ==
- List of Border representative cricketers
