= Gustav Dam =

South African cricketer

Personal information
- Born: 16 April 1908; Port Elizabeth, South Africa
- Died: 23 April 1946 (aged 38); East London, South Africa
- Source: Cricinfo, 6 December 2020

Gustav Dam (16 April 1908 – 23 April 1946) was a South African cricketer. He played in two first-class matches for Border in 1931/32.

== See also ==
- List of Border representative cricketers
