= Charles Smith (South African cricketer) =

South African cricketer (1905–1967)

Personal information
- Born: 2 July 1905; Rouxville, South Africa
- Died: 17 September 1967 (aged 62); East London, South Africa
- Source: Cricinfo, 12 December 2020

Charles Smith (2 July 1905 – 17 September 1967) was a South African cricketer. He played in one first-class match for Border in 1929/30.

== See also ==
- List of Border representative cricketers
