= Wallace Treadaway =

South African cricketer (1918–2003)

Personal information
- Born: 15 May 1918; Cape Town, South Africa
- Died: 18 August 2003 (aged 85); Cape Town, South Africa
- Source: Cricinfo, 12 December 2020

Wallace Treadaway (15 May 1918 – 18 August 2003) was a South African cricketer. He played in nine first-class matches for Border from 1947/48 to 1949/50.

== See also ==
- List of Border representative cricketers
