= David Stephen =

South African cricketer (born 1951)

Personal information
- Born: 26 September 1951; Cathcart, South Africa
- Died: 21 March 2020 (aged 68) March 2020
- Source: Cricinfo, 12 December 2020

David Leslie Stephen (26 September 1951 – 21 March 2020) was a South African cricketer. He played in one first-class and one List A match for Border in 1972/73 and 1977/78.

== See also ==
- List of Border representative cricketers
