= Mansfield Hartley =

South African cricketer (born 1955)

Personal information
- Born: 7 January 1955 (age 71); Komga, South Africa
- Source: Cricinfo, 6 December 2020

Mansfield Hartley (born 7 January 1955) is a South African cricketer. He played in one List A and six first-class matches for Border in 1981/82 and 1983/84.

== See also ==
- List of Border representative cricketers
