= Raymond Kemp (South African cricketer) =

South African cricketer (born 1946)

Personal information
- Born: 13 September 1946 (age 80); Queenstown, South Africa
- Source: Cricinfo, 6 December 2020

Raymond Kemp (born 13 September 1946) is a South African former cricketer. He played in one List A and seven first-class matches for Border from 1967/68 to 1977/78.

== See also ==
- List of Border representative cricketers
