= Daniel van Heerden =

South African cricketer (born 1944)

Personal information
- Born: 4 January 1944
- Died: 29 February 2024 (aged 80)
- Batting: Right-handed
- Bowling: Right-arm medium

Domestic team information
- Years: Team
- 1974/75: Border
- Source: Cricinfo, 12 December 2020

Daniel van Heerden (4 January 1944 – 29 February 2024) was a South African cricketer. He played in one first-class match for Border in 1974/75.

== Cricket career ==
Van Heerden’s professional cricket career was brief, marked by a single first-class appearance. Playing for Border in the 1974–75 season, he contributed to the team’s roster at a time when South Africa’s domestic leagues were the primary competitive platforms for players, due to the country's exclusion from international cricket during apartheid.

== See also ==
- List of Border representative cricketers
