= Rodney Gordon (cricketer) =

South African cricketer (1923–1990)

Personal information
- Born: 18 December 1923; King William's Town, South Africa
- Died: 7 August 1990 (aged 66); Harare, Zimbabwe
- Source: Cricinfo, 6 December 2020

Rodney Gordon (18 December 1923 – 7 March 1990) is a South African cricketer. He played in one first-class match for Border in 1939/40.

== See also ==
- List of Border representative cricketers
