= Peter Taylor (South African cricketer) =

South African cricketer (born 1934)

Personal information
- Born: 2 November 1934 (age 92); East London, South Africa
- Source: Cricinfo, 12 December 2020

Peter Taylor (born 2 November 1934) is a South African cricketer. He played in six first-class matches for Border from 1959/60 to 1964/65.

== See also ==
- List of Border representative cricketers
