= Victor Schaefer =

South African cricketer (1907–1991)

Personal information
- Born: 2 February 1907; King William's Town, South Africa
- Died: 16 February 1991 (aged 84); Harare, Zimbabwe
- Source: Cricinfo, 12 December 2020

Victor Schaefer (2 February 1907 – 16 February 1991) was a South African cricketer. He played in three first-class matches for Border in 1929/30.

== See also ==
- List of Border representative cricketers
