= Nolan Flemmer =

South African cricketer (1938–2018)

Personal information
- Born: 28 February 1938; East London, South Africa
- Died: 22 January 2018 (aged 79); East London, South Africa
- Source: Cricinfo, 6 December 2020

Nolan Flemmer (28 February 1938 – 22 January 2018) was a South African cricketer. He played in four first-class matches for Border in 1962/63.

== See also ==
- List of Border representative cricketers
