= Philip Farrer =

South African cricketer (1945–1993)

Personal information
- Born: 26 May 1945; King William's Town, South Africa
- Died: 18 May 1993 (aged 47); King William's Town, South Africa
- Source: Cricinfo, 6 December 2020

Philip Farrer (26 May 1945 – 18 May 1993) was a South African cricketer. He played in one List A and two first-class matches for Border in 1970/71.

== See also ==
- List of Border representative cricketers
