= James Wilson (cricketer) =

South African cricketer (born 1978)

Personal information
- Born: 3 November 1978 (age 48); Queenstown, South Africa
- Source: Cricinfo, 12 December 2020

James Wilson (born 3 November 1978) is a South African former cricketer. He played in one first-class and one List A match for Border in 1999/00 and 2000/01.

== See also ==
- List of Border representative cricketers
