= Ira Neuper =

South African cricketer (1922–1994)

Personal information
- Born: 15 August 1922; East London, South Africa
- Died: 11 November 1994 (aged 72); East London, South Africa
- Source: Cricinfo, 12 December 2020

Ira Neuper (15 August 1922 – 11 November 1994) was a South African cricketer. He played in three first-class matches for Border in 1950/51.

== See also ==
- List of Border representative cricketers
