= Jeffrey Hosking =

South African cricketer (born 1953)

Personal information
- Born: 21 June 1953 (age 73); Johannesburg, South Africa
- Source: Cricinfo, 6 December 2020

Jeffrey Hosking (born 21 June 1953) is a South African cricketer. He played in one List A and eleven first-class matches for Border from 1980/81 to 1984/85.

== See also ==
- List of Border representative cricketers
