= Charles Eager =

South African cricketer (1883–1948)

Personal information
- Born: July 1883; Steynsburg, South Africa
- Died: 17 November 1948; Johannesburg, South Africa
- Source: Cricinfo, 6 December 2020

Charles Eager (July 1883 – 17 November 1948) was a South African cricketer. He played in one first-class match for Border in 1906/07.

== See also ==
- List of Border representative cricketers
