= Walter Lamplough =

South African cricketer (1866–1918)

Personal information
- Born: 31 August 1866; Middledrift, Cape Colony
- Died: 6 September 1918 (aged 52); Bloemhof District, South Africa
- Source: Cricinfo, 6 December 2020

Walter Lamplough (31 August 1866 – 6 September 1918) was a South African cricketer. He played in two first-class matches for Border in 1897/98.

== See also ==
- List of Border representative cricketers
