= Harold Bowley =

South African cricketer

Personal information
- Born: 15 March 1909; Estcourt, South Africa
- Died: 1978 (aged 68–69)
- Batting: Right-handed

Domestic team information
- Years: Team
- 1929/30–1939/40: Border
- Source: Cricinfo, 6 December 2020

Harold Bowley (15 March 1909 – 1978) was a South African cricketer. He played in fourteen first-class matches for Border from 1929/30 to 1939/40.

== See also ==
- List of Border representative cricketers
