= Philip Melville =

South African cricketer

Personal information
- Born: 11 August 1904; Edinburgh, Scotland
- Died: 1 February 1974 (aged 69); Scottburgh, South Africa
- Source: Cricinfo, 12 December 2020

Philip Melville (11 August 1904 – 1 February 1974) was a South African cricketer. He played in one first-class match for Border in 1926/27.

== See also ==
- List of Border representative cricketers
