= Frank Goldschmidt =

South African cricketer

Personal information
- Born: 11 June 1900; East London, Cape Colony
- Source: Cricinfo, 6 December 2020

Frank Goldschmidt (born 11 June 1900, date of death unknown) was a South African cricketer. He played in ten first-class matches for Border from 1920/21 to 1929/30.

== See also ==
- List of Border representative cricketers
