= Desmond Niland =

South African cricketer (1912–1978)

Personal information
- Born: 8 November 1912; Fort Beaufort, South Africa
- Died: 15 January 1978 (aged 65); Fort Beaufort, South Africa
- Source: Cricinfo, 12 December 2020

Desmond Niland (8 November 1912 – 15 January 1978) was a South African cricketer. He played in fourteen first-class matches for Border and Eastern Province from 1934/35 to 1947/48.

== See also ==
- List of Border representative cricketers
