= Ian McClenaghan =

South African cricketer (born 1946)

Personal information
- Born: 30 May 1946 (age 80); East London, South Africa
- Source: Cricinfo, 12 December 2020

Ian McClenaghan (born 30 May 1946) is a South African cricketer. He played in forty first-class and eight List A matches for Border from 1968/69 to 1978/79.

== See also ==
- List of Border representative cricketers
