= Walter Beauchamp (cricketer) =

South African cricketer (1887–1976)

Personal information
- Born: 20 December 1887; King William's Town, South Africa
- Died: 8 July 1976 (aged 88); King William's Town, South Africa
- Source: Cricinfo, 6 December 2020

Walter Beauchamp (20 December 1887 – 8 July 1976) was a South African cricketer. He played in four first-class match for Border from 1913/14 to 1923/24.

== See also ==
- List of Border representative cricketers
