= Mlungisi Ngece =

South African cricketer (born 1966)

Personal information
- Born: 18 September 1966 (age 60); King William's Town, South Africa
- Source: Cricinfo, 12 December 2020

Mlungisi Ngece (born 18 September 1966) is a South African former cricketer. He played in one first-class and one List A match for Border in 1997 and 2005 respectively.

== See also ==
- List of Border representative cricketers
