= John Buckley (cricketer) =

South African cricketer (born 1956)

Personal information
- Born: 14 July 1956 (age 70); East London, South Africa
- Source: Cricinfo, 6 December 2020

John Buckley (born 14 July 1956) is a South African cricketer. He played in two List A and seven first-class matches for Border in 1979/80 and 1980/81.

== See also ==
- List of Border representative cricketers
