= Mark Cornell (cricketer) =

South African cricketer (born 1939)

Personal information
- Born: 5 May 1939 (age 87); Stutterheim, South Africa
- Source: Cricinfo, 6 December 2020

Mark Cornell (born 5 May 1939) is a South African cricketer. He played in seven first-class matches for Border in 1959/60 and 1960/61.

== See also ==
- List of Border representative cricketers
