= Kenneth Hay =

South African cricketer (1927–2002)

Personal information
- Born: 19 April 1927; Queenstown, South Africa
- Died: 9 July 2002 (aged 75); Cape Town, South Africa
- Source: Cricinfo, 6 December 2020

Kenneth Hay (19 April 1927 – 9 July 2002) was a South African cricketer. He played in eleven first-class matches for Border from 1952/53 to 1955/56.

== See also ==
- List of Border representative cricketers
