= Richard Baines (cricketer) =

South African cricketer (born 1932)

Personal information
- Full name: Capel John Richard Baines
- Born: 3 August 1932; King William's Town, South Africa
- Died: 2 November 2021 (aged 89)
- Batting: Right-handed

Domestic team information
- Years: Team
- 1952/53: Border
- Source: Cricinfo, 6 December 2020

Capel John Richard Baines (3 August 1932 – 2 November 2021) was a South African cricketer. He played in three first-class matches for Border in 1952/53.

== See also ==
- List of Border representative cricketers
