= Lofty Brits =

South African cricketer (1926–2000)

Personal information
- Full name: Gerhardus Barend Brits
- Born: 10 July 1926; East London, South Africa
- Died: 6 April 2000 (aged 73); Southernwood, South Africa
- Source: Cricinfo, 6 December 2020

Lofty Brits (10 July 1926 – 6 April 2000) was a South African cricketer. He played in two first-class matches for Border in 1950/51.

== See also ==
- List of Border representative cricketers
