= Theophilus Riemer =

South African cricketer (1876–1958)

Personal information
- Born: 6 February 1876; King William's Town, Cape Colony
- Died: 30 August 1958 (aged 82); Durban, South Africa
- Source: Cricinfo, 12 December 2020

Theophilus Riemer (6 February 1876 – 30 August 1958) was a South African cricketer. He played in three first-class matches for Border in 1897/98.

== See also ==
- List of Border representative cricketers
