= Trevor Tarr =

South African cricketer (1923–1998)

Personal information
- Born: 30 March 1923; Peddie, South Africa
- Died: 6 September 1998 (aged 75); Gonubie, South Africa
- Source: Cricinfo, 12 December 2020

Trevor Tarr (30 March 1923 – 6 September 1998) was a South African cricketer. He played in one first-class match for Border in 1951/52.

== See also ==
- List of Border representative cricketers
