= Dirk Scott =

South African cricketer (born 1955)

Personal information
- Born: 14 September 1955 (age 71); Johannesburg, South Africa
- Source: Cricinfo, 12 December 2020

Dirk Scott (born 14 September 1955) is a South African cricketer. He played in seventeen first-class and four List A matches for Border from 1978/79 to 1984/85.

== See also ==
- List of Border representative cricketers
