= Neville Edwards =

South African cricketer (1941–2021)

Personal information
- Full name: Neville Harry Edwards
- Born: 5 November 1941; East London, South Africa
- Died: 28 June 2021 (aged 79)
- Batting: Right-handed
- Bowling: Right-arm fast

Domestic team information
- Years: Team
- 1965/66: Border
- Source: Cricinfo, 6 December 2020

Neville Harry Edwards (5 November 1941 – 28 June 2021) was a South African cricketer. He played in three first-class matches for Border in 1965/66.

== See also ==
- List of Border representative cricketers
