= John Sansom =

South African cricketer (born 1936)

Personal information
- Born: 20 December 1936 (age 89); East London, South Africa
- Source: Cricinfo, 12 December 2020

John Sansom (born 20 December 1936) is a South African cricketer. He played in six first-class matches for Border from 1962/63 to 1965/66.

== See also ==
- List of Border representative cricketers
