= Gary McKinnon (cricketer) =

South African cricketer (born 1963)

Personal information
- Born: 3 June 1963 (age 63); Port Elizabeth, South Africa
- Source: Cricinfo, 12 December 2020

Gary McKinnon (born 3 June 1963) is a South African cricketer. He played in one first-class and seven List A matches for Border from 1989/90 to 1991/92.

== See also ==
- List of Border representative cricketers
