= Michael Ballantyne (cricketer) =

South African cricketer (born 1948)

Personal information
- Born: 17 March 1948 (age 78); East London, South Africa
- Source: Cricinfo, 6 December 2020

Michael Ballantyne (born 17 March 1948) is a South African cricketer. He played in 29 first-class and 3 List A matches for Border from 1974/75 to 1985/86.

== See also ==
- List of Border representative cricketers
