= Hubert Wood =

South African cricketer (1893–1957)

Personal information
- Born: 14 May 1893; Grahamstown, South Africa
- Died: 23 February 1957 (aged 63)
- Source: Cricinfo, 12 December 2020

Hubert Wood (14 May 1893 – 23 February 1957) was a South African cricketer. He played in six first-class matches for Border from 1920/21 to 1924/25.

== See also ==
- List of Border representative cricketers
