= Kenneth Postman =

South African cricketer (born 1955)

Personal information
- Born: 5 November 1955 (age 71); East London, South Africa
- Source: Cricinfo, 12 December 2020

Kenneth Postman (born 5 November 1955) is a South African cricketer. He played in one first-class match for Border in 1979/80.

== See also ==
- List of Border representative cricketers
