= John Forbes (cricketer) =

South African cricketer (1931–2017)

Personal information
- Born: 12 July 1931; East London, South Africa
- Died: 24 February 2017 (aged 85)
- Source: Cricinfo, 6 December 2020

John Forbes (12 July 1931 – 24 February 2017) was a South African cricketer. He played in two first-class matches for Border in 1952/53.

== See also ==
- List of Border representative cricketers
