= Justin Price (cricketer) =

South African cricketer (born 1972)

Personal information
- Born: 26 September 1972 (age 54); Grahamstown, South Africa
- Source: Cricinfo, 12 December 2020

Justin Price (born 26 September 1972) is a South African former cricketer. He played in two first-class matches for Border in 1994/95.

== See also ==
- List of Border representative cricketers
