= Malcolm Scott (South African cricketer) =

South African cricketer (born 1947)

Personal information
- Born: 17 May 1947 (age 79); Pretoria, South Africa
- Source: Cricinfo, 12 December 2020

Malcolm Scott (born 17 May 1947) is a South African cricketer. He played in fifteen first-class matches from 1965/66 to 1971/72.
