= William Bremner (cricketer) =

South African cricketer

Personal information
- Born: 1884; Queenstown, Cape Colony
- Died: 30 March 1961 (aged 76–77); Balfour, Eastern Cape, South Africa
- Source: Cricinfo, 6 December 2020

William Bremner (1884 – 30 March 1961) was a Cape Colony cricketer. He played in one first-class match for Border in 1906/07.

== See also ==
- List of Border representative cricketers
