= Ian Lloyd (photographer) =

Australian photographer

Richard Ian Lloyd
- Born: 2 March 1953 (age 73); Midland, Ontario, Canada
- Education: Rochester Institute of Technology, Brooks Institute of Photography

R. Ian Lloyd (born 2 March 1953) is an Australian photographer who was born in Canada in 1953 and studied photography at Rochester Institute of Technology and Brooks Institute of Photography in the United States before coming to Australia in 1975. He worked in television and as a photographer for guide books before establishing his own photography and publishing company in Singapore in 1983. Ian has undertaken commissions for magazines such as National Geographic, Fortune and Time, and has won numerous awards for his work. He has photographed 36 books on countries and regions around Asia including large format books on Kathmandu, Bali and Singapore and a four volume series on Australian wine regions. His photographs have been widely exhibited around the world. In 2000 a retrospective book and exhibition of his work, Spirit of Asia, toured six Asian cities under the sponsorship of the National Geographic Channel. In 2007 he produced a book, DVD and travelling exhibition entitled STUDIO: Australian Painters on the Nature of Creativity.

== Biography ==
Born and raised in Canada, Ian studied at Rochester Institute of Technology and Brooks Institute of Photography before striking out for the South Pacific, where he worked a year in New Zealand and three in Australia before finally settling in Singapore (1980) as managing director of the APA Photo Library and chief photographer for several Insight Guide books.

He formed his own company, R. Ian Lloyd Productions, in 1983 and has since photographed 36 books on Asia and Australia. His photography has appeared in international magazines including National Geographic, Newsweek, Fortune, Condé Nast Traveler, Gourmet and Business Week. Multinational companies as diverse as ExxonMobil, Pepsi, Motorola, Singapore Airlines and Canon have commissioned his commercial photography.

Ian has won awards for his work, and in 2000 a retrospective book and exhibition of his photography, Spirit of Asia, toured six Asian cities under the sponsorship of the National Geographic Channel. In 2007 he published and produced a book, DVD and travelling exhibition entitled STUDIO: Australian Painters on the Nature of Creativity with the writer John McDonald.

== Works ==
=== Solo exhibitions ===
- 2007 STUDIO: Australian Painters by R. Ian Lloyd, National Portrait Gallery, Canberra travelling in 2008 and 2009 to the Festival of Perth, Perth WA, State Library of Queensland, Brisbane QLD, State Library of New South Wales, Sydney NSW and State Library of Victoria Melbourne VIC.
- 2007 India; The Photography of R. Ian Lloyd, Berlin Germany and Delhi India sponsored by the National Geographic Channel
- 2004 The Travel Photography of R. Ian Lloyd Kuala Lumpur, Malaysia sponsored by the National Geographic Channel
- 2000 Spirit of Asia: Twenty Years of Photography by R. Ian Lloyd, Singapore, Kuala Lumpur Malaysia, Hong Kong, Manila Philippines, Taipei Taiwan.
- 1977 R. Ian Lloyd Colour Photography Fremantle Arts Centre, Fremantle Western Australia.
- 1973 The Nixon Inauguration Rochester Institute of Technology, Rochester New York

=== Group exhibitions ===
- 2007 Sydney Life Photography Exhibition, Hyde Park, Sydney Australia
- 2006 Head-On Portrait Prize Exhibition The Photographers Gallery, Balmain, Sydney Australia
- 2005 Head-On Portrait Prize Exhibition, Michael Nagy Fine Art Gallery, Sydney Australia

== Awards ==
- Communication Arts Photography Annual (1994)
- Singapore Tourist Promotion Board Award (1993)
- Communication Arts Photography Annual (1991)
- Photo of the Year Awards – Missouri School of Journalism (1991)
- Pacific Area Travel Association Photography Gold Award (1991)
- Pacific Area Travel Association Photography Grand Award (1989)
- Pacific Area Travel Association Photography Grand Award (1985)
- Chicago International Communication Festival Silver Award (1983)
- New York International Film and Television Festival Bronze Award (1982)
