= Wilhelm Rein (cricketer) =

South African cricketer (1911–1994)

Personal information
- Born: 31 March 1911; Fort Beaufort, South Africa
- Died: 1 December 1994 (aged 83); Durban, South Africa
- Source: Cricinfo, 12 December 2020

Wilhelm Rein (31 March 1911 – 1 December 1994) was a South African cricketer. He played in five first-class matches from 1933/34 to 1947/48.
