= Quentin Still =

South African cricketer (born 1974)

Personal information
- Born: 8 August 1974 (age 52); Pietermaritzburg, South Africa
- Source: Cricinfo, 12 December 2020

Quentin Still (born 8 August 1974) is a South African cricketer. He played in 39 first-class and 2 List A matches from 1992/93 to 2000/01.
