= Cassie van der Merwe =

South African cricketer (born 1973)

Personal information
- Full name: Casparus Cornelius van der Merwe
- Born: 11 July 1973 (age 53); Johannesburg, South Africa
- Source: Cricinfo, 12 December 2020

Cassie van der Merwe (born 11 July 1973) is a South African cricketer. He played in eighteen first-class and thirteen List A matches from 1994/95 to 1998/99.
