= Warne Rippon =

South African cricketer (born 1966)

Personal information
- Born: 31 August 1966 (age 60)
- Source: Cricinfo, 18 March 2020

Warne Rippon (born 31 August 1966) is a South African cricketer. He played in thirteen first-class and six List A matches between 1985 and 1995. In February 2020, he was named in South Africa's squad for the Over-50s Cricket World Cup in South Africa. However, the tournament was cancelled during the third round of matches due to the COVID-19 pandemic.
