= Murray Ranger =

South African cricketer (born 1984)

Personal information
- Born: 18 April 1984 (age 42); Stutterheim, South Africa
- Source: Cricinfo, 12 December 2020

Murray Ranger (born 18 April 1984) is a South African former cricketer. He played in 26 first-class, 24 List A, and 2 Twenty20 matches from 2004 to 2010.
