= Siyabulela Nelani =

South African cricketer (born 1979)

Personal information
- Born: 24 January 1979 (age 47); East London, South Africa
- Source: Cricinfo, 12 December 2020

Siyabulela Nelani (born 24 January 1979) is a South African cricketer. He played in five first-class matches for Border in 2001/02 and 2002/03.

== See also ==
- List of Border representative cricketers
