= Peter Shuman =

South African cricketer (1933–1993)

Personal information
- Born: 19 January 1933; Indwe, South Africa
- Died: 29 January 1993 (aged 60); East London, South Africa
- Source: Cricinfo, 12 December 2020

Peter Shuman (19 January 1933 – 29 January 1993) was a South African cricketer. He played in thirteen first-class matches from 1954/55 to 1963/64.
