= Ernest Birch (cricketer) =

South African cricketer (1930–2006)

Personal information
- Born: 3 April 1930; Dordrecht, South Africa
- Died: 3 March 2006 (aged 75); Dordrecht, South Africa
- Source: Cricinfo, 6 December 2020

Ernest Birch (3 April 1930 – 3 March 2006) was a South African cricketer. He played in two first-class matches for Border in 1947/48 and 1948/49.

== See also ==
- List of Border representative cricketers
