= Kenneth Marshall (cricketer) =

South African cricketer (born 1935)

Personal information
- Born: 27 February 1935; Kei Road, South Africa
- Died: 3 February 2024 (aged 88)
- Source: Cricinfo, 12 December 2020

Kenneth Marshall (27 February 1935 – 3 February 2024) was a South African cricketer. He played in five first-class matches for Border from 1963/64 to 1967/68.

== See also ==
- List of Border representative cricketers
