= Edwin Schreiber =

South African cricketer

Personal information
- Full name: Edwin Frederick Schreiber
- Born: 31 May 1936; East London, Cape Province, South Africa
- Died: 7 October 2010 (aged 74); Durban, KwaZulu-Natal, South Africa
- Batting: Right-handed
- Bowling: Right-arm off-spin

Domestic team information
- Years: Team
- 1954–55 to 1966–67: Border

Career statistics
Competition	First-class
Matches	40
Runs scored	527
Batting average	8.93
100s/50s	0/0
Top score	38
Balls bowled	12023
Wickets	155
Bowling average	24.34
5 wickets in innings	11
10 wickets in match	3
Best bowling	8/67
Catches/stumpings	35/–
- Source: Cricinfo, 30 October 2018

Edwin Frederick Schreiber (31 May 1936 – 7 October 2010) was a South African cricketer who played first-class cricket for Border from 1954 to 1967.

Edwin Schreiber, an off-spin bowler, was the mainstay of the Border spin attack from 1954–55, when he made his debut as an 18-year-old, until 1961–62. He bowled well for Border against the touring MCC in 1956–57 and Australians in 1957–58. In the 1957–58 season he was the second-most successful South African bowler (behind Hugh Tayfield), with 38 wickets at an average of 21.92.

He was widely expected to take Tayfield's place as South Africa's principal Test spinner when Tayfield retired after the 1957–58 series, but Tayfield returned after taking only the 1958–59 season off while Schreiber's form fell away from its peak.

Schreiber was a very economical bowler, conceding only 1.88 runs per over in his first-class career. In 1958–59 he took 11 for 103 off 72.4 overs in the match against North-Eastern Transvaal. His best innings figures were 8 for 67 against Eastern Province in 1957–58. He was a magnificent fielder, especially at cover. In a club match for Buffaloes against Queenstown he ran out four batsmen in one innings with direct hits.
