= Errol Witherden =

South African cricketer

Personal information
- Born: 27 August 1922; Middelburg, South Africa
- Died: 7 July 2009 (aged 86); Durban, South Africa
- Source: Cricinfo, 12 December 2020

Errol Witherden (27 August 1922 – 7 July 2009) was a South African cricketer. He played in seven first-class matches for Border from 1954/55 to 1958/59.

== See also ==
- List of Border representative cricketers
