= William Ayres (cricketer) =

South African cricketer

Personal information
- Born: 6 April 1906; Port Elizabeth, South Africa
- Died: 13 December 1978 (aged 72); Krugersdorp, South Africa
- Source: Cricinfo, 6 December 2020

William Ayres (6 April 1906 – 13 December 1978) was a South African cricketer. He played in two first-class matches for Border in 1939/40.

== See also ==
- List of Border representative cricketers
