= Bennett Sekonyela =

South African cricketer (born 1982)

Personal information
- Born: 11 October 1982 (age 44); Kimberley, South Africa
- Source: Cricinfo, 12 December 2020

Bennett Sekonyela (born 11 October 1982) is a South African cricketer. He played in seventeen first-class and seventeen List A matches from 2002 to 2007.
