= Ivor Gardiner =

South African cricketer

Personal information
- Born: 3 December 1903; Queenstown, South Africa
- Died: 17 July 1951 (aged 47); Queenstown, South Africa
- Source: Cricinfo, 6 December 2020

Ivor Gardiner (3 December 1903 – 17 July 1951) was a South African cricketer. He played in 25 first-class matches from 1926/27 to 1937/38.
