= Billy Bremner (Australian footballer) =

Australian rules footballer

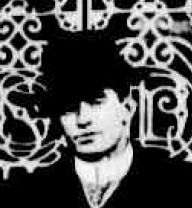

Personal information
- Full name: William Bremner
- Born: 23 June 1872; North Melbourne, Victoria
- Died: 2 April 1957 (aged 84); Camberwell, Victoria
- Original team: Williamstown

Playing career^{1}
Years	Club	Games (Goals)
1903–1904	Melbourne	23 (1)
- ^{1} Playing statistics correct to the end of 1904.

William Bremner (23 June 1872 – 2 April 1957) was an Australian rules footballer who played with Melbourne in the Victorian Football League (VFL).

Bremner came to Melbourne from Williamstown after playing 22 games without kicking a goal in 1898, 1900, 1901 & 1902, and was already aged 30 when he played his first league game. He appeared in 16 of Melbourne's 17 games in the 1903 VFL season, followed by seven games in 1904.

From 1910 to 1912, Bremner officiated in 15 VFL games as a boundary umpire and six games as a field umpire.
