= Gordon Minkley =

South African cricketer (born 1936)

Personal information
- Full name: Gordon Andrew Minkley
- Born: 2 October 1936 (age 90); King William's Town, Cape Province, South Africa
- Batting: Right-handed

Domestic team information
- Years: Team
- 1962–63 to 1970–71: Border

Career statistics
Competition	First-class	List A
Matches	23	2
Runs scored	697	50
Batting average	19.91	25.00
100s/50s	1/0	0/0
Top score	135	26
Balls bowled	12	0
Wickets	0	–
Bowling average	–	–
5 wickets in innings	–	–
10 wickets in match	–	–
Best bowling	–	–
Catches/stumpings	17/–	0/–
- Source: Cricinfo, 1 April 2017

Gordon Andrew Minkley (born 2 October 1936) is a former cricketer who played first-class cricket for Border from 1962 to 1971.

Minkley was an opening and middle-order batsman who achieved little in his first season, 1962–63. He did not play again for Border until 1967–68, when he was appointed captain, a position he held for the remainder of his career. His only fifty was also his only century: 135 in an innings victory over Griqualand West in 1969–70.

He is one of the three honorary life vice-presidents of Border Cricket.
