= William Wilson (South African cricketer) =

South African cricketer (1925–2005)

Personal information
- Born: 8 April 1925; Port Elizabeth, South Africa
- Died: 19 April 2005 (aged 80); Darling, South Africa
- Source: Cricinfo, 12 December 2020

William Wilson (8 April 1925 – 19 April 2005) was a South African cricketer. He played in twenty-five first-class matches from 1945/46 to 1960/61.
