= Wally Chalmers (cricketer) =

South African cricketer (1934–2011)

Personal information
- Full name: Walter Rochfort Chalmers
- Born: 27 July 1934; East London, South Africa
- Died: 18 July 2011 (aged 76); Cape Town, South Africa
- Batting: Left-handed
- Bowling: Slow left-arm orthodox
- Role: Bowler

Domestic team information
- Years: Team
- 1951/52–1959/60: Border
- 1960/61–1962/63: Orange Free State
- 1963/64: Western Province

Career statistics
Competition	FC
Matches	48
Runs scored	181
Batting average	4.89
100s/50s	0/0
Top score	12
Balls bowled	11,912
Wickets	167
Bowling average	24.41
5 wickets in innings	8
10 wickets in match	0
Best bowling	6/55
Catches/stumpings	19/–
- Source: Cricinfo, 21 April 2024

Walter Rochfort Chalmers (27 July 1934 – 18 July 2011) was a South African cricketer. He played in 48 first-class matches from 1951/52 to 1963/64.

Chalmers was born in East London and educated at Dale College in King William's Town. He was a slow left-arm orthodox spin bowler who was considered one of the best spin bowlers in South Africa during the 1950s, but his chances of playing Test cricket were hampered by his lack of ability as a batsman and fielder.

Chalmers' best first-class bowling figures were 6 for 55 (match figures of 59.3–26–96–8, eight-ball overs) when Border defeated North Eastern Transvaal in the Currie Cup in 1954–55. He took 5 for 133 for Border against the touring English team in 1956–57.
