= Murray Krug =

South African cricketer (born 1972)

Personal information
- Born: 30 April 1972 (age 54); East London, South Africa
- Source: Cricinfo, 6 December 2020

Murray Krug (born 30 April 1972) is a South African cricketer. He played in twelve first-class matches from 1992/93 to 1995/96.
