= Raymond Morkel =

South African cricketer

Personal information
- Born: 23 August 1908; Bellville, Western Cape, South Africa
- Died: 8 November 1953 (aged 45); Worcester, Western Cape, South Africa
- Source: Cricinfo, 12 December 2020

Raymond Morkel (23 August 1908 – 8 November 1953) was a South African cricketer. He played in sixteen first-class matches from 1926/27 to 1939/40.
