= Gavin Victor =

South African cricketer (born 1966)

Personal information
- Born: 11 August 1966 (age 60); Port Elizabeth, South Africa
- Source: Cricinfo, 12 December 2020

Gavin Victor (born 11 August 1966) is a South African cricketer. He played in 57 first-class and 78 List A matches from 1987/88 to 1997/98.
