= Keith Sansom =

South African cricketer (born 1956)

Personal information
- Born: 6 May 1956 (age 70); East London, South Africa
- Source: Cricinfo, 12 December 2020

Keith Sansom (born 6 May 1956) is a South African cricketer. He played in one List A and eight first-class matches from 1976/77 to 1983/84.
