= Raymond le Roux =

South African cricketer (born 1950)

Personal information
- Born: 27 May 1950 (age 76); Bloemfontein, South Africa
- Source: Cricinfo, 6 December 2020

Raymond le Roux (born 27 May 1950) is a South African cricketer. He played in 94 first-class and 18 List A matches from 1968/69 to 1988/89.
