= Donnie Preston =

South African cricketer (1914–2006)

Personal information
- Full name: John Beal Preston
- Born: 16 January 1914; East London, South Africa
- Died: 12 December 2006 (aged 92); Cathcart, South Africa
- Source: Cricinfo, 12 December 2020

Donnie Preston (16 January 1914 – 12 December 2006) was a South African cricketer. He played in twelve first-class matches from 1933/34 to 1947/48.
