= Richard Evans (South African cricketer) =

South African cricketer

Personal information
- Full name: Richard James Evans
- Born: 11 October 1914; East London, Cape Province, Union of South Africa
- Died: 29 May 1943 (aged 28); South Atlantic Ocean, near Danger Point Lighthouse, Cape Town, Cape Province, Union of South Africa
- Batting: Right-handed
- Bowling: Right-arm leg-spin

Domestic team information
- Years: Team
- 1934–35 to 1939–40: Border

Career statistics
Competition	First-class
Matches	10
Runs scored	234
Batting average	13.00
100s/50s	0/1
Top score	88
Balls bowled	1543
Wickets	49
Bowling average	18.48
5 wickets in innings	4
10 wickets in match	2
Best bowling	8/64
Catches/stumpings	7/–
- Source: Cricinfo, 20 January 2018

Richard James Evans (11 October 1914 – 29 May 1943) was a South African cricketer who played first-class cricket for Border from 1934 to 1940.

Richard Evans was a leg-spin and googly bowler who had an exceptional career strike-rate: a wicket every 31.48 deliveries. He had an outstanding season for Border in 1937–38 when he was 23. In the first match, against Western Province, he took 5 for 72 and 4 for 92, and Border won by seven wickets. Then, in Border's innings victory over Eastern Province he took 4 for 50 and 6 for 40. Later, in the victory over Orange Free State, he took 5 for 27 and 2 for 28, and a week after that, in the loss to Transvaal, he took 2 for 29 and 8 for 64. He finished the season with 36 wickets in five matches off 867 balls at a bowling average of 13.11 and a strike-rate of a wicket every 24.08 balls. Only Norman Gordon of Transvaal, with 39 wickets off 1798 balls, took more wickets in the season.

However, Evans's considerable promise was unfulfilled. He played only two more first-class matches before the Second World War. He died in May 1943 while serving in the South African Air Force, when his Avro Anson stalled and crashed into the sea off Danger Point. In civilian life he worked as a refrigeration engineer and lived with his wife in East London.
