= Gavin Fraser (cricketer) =

South African cricketer (born 1952)

Personal information
- Born: 4 August 1952 (age 74); Port Elizabeth, South Africa
- Source: Cricinfo, 6 December 2020

Gavin Fraser (born 4 August 1952) is a South African cricketer. He played in 35 first-class and 6 List A matches from 1977/78 to 1989/90.
