= Samuel Schmidt =

South African cricketer (born 1945)

Personal information
- Born: 9 August 1945 (age 81); Port Elizabeth, South Africa
- Source: Cricinfo, 12 December 2020

Samuel Schmidt (born 9 August 1945) is a South African cricketer. He played in 29 first-class and 9 List A matches from 1968/69 to 1980/81.
