= Neil Mitchell (cricketer) =

South African cricketer (born 1936)

Personal information
- Born: 10 May 1936 (age 90)
- Source: Cricinfo, 12 December 2020

Neil Mitchell (born 10 May 1936) is a South African cricketer. He played in one first-class match for Border in 1954/55.

== See also ==
- List of Border representative cricketers
