= Vernon Cresswell =

South African cricketer (born 1958)

Personal information
- Born: 15 September 1958 (age 68); Pretoria, South Africa
- Source: Cricinfo, 6 December 2020

Vernon Cresswell (born 15 September 1958) is a South African cricketer. He played in 46 first-class and 5 List A matches from 1980/81 to 1990/91.
