= Alfred Hicks (cricketer) =

South African cricketer (1916–1999)

Personal information
- Born: 10 August 1916; Cape Town, South Africa
- Died: 20 June 1999 (aged 82); Summerstrand, South Africa
- Source: Cricinfo, 6 December 2020

Alfred Hicks (10 August 1916 – 20 June 1999) was a South African cricketer. He played in thirty first-class matches from 1946/47 to 1956/57.
