= Geoff Love (cricketer) =

South African cricketer (born 1976)

Personal information
- Born: 19 September 1976 (age 50); Port Elizabeth, South Africa
- Source: Cricinfo, 6 December 2020

Geoff Love (born 19 September 1976) is a South African cricketer. He played in 60 first-class and 24 List A matches from 1995 to 2004.
