= Ernest Holmes (cricketer) =

South African cricketer (1918–1987)

Personal information
- Born: 14 February 1918; Elliotdale, South Africa
- Died: 2 March 1987 (aged 69); Empangeni, South Africa
- Source: Cricinfo, 6 December 2020

Ernest Holmes (14 February 1918 – 2 March 1987) was a South African cricketer. He played in two first-class matches for Border in 1939/40.

== See also ==
- List of Border representative cricketers
