= Marchant Davies =

South African cricketer (1896–1973)

Personal information
- Full name: Marchant Starr Davies
- Born: 31 May 1896; Balfour, Cape Colony
- Died: 22 February 1973 (aged 76); Port Elizabeth, South Africa

Domestic team information
- Years: Team
- 1921/22–1926/27: Eastern Province

Career statistics
| Competition | First-class |
|---|---|
| Matches | 11 |
| Runs scored | 165 |
| Batting average | 9.16 |
| 100s/50s | 0/0 |
| Top score | 38 |
| Balls bowled | 805 |
| Wickets | 11 |
| Bowling average | 46.09 |
| 5 wickets in innings | 0 |
| 10 wickets in match | 0 |
| Best bowling | 2/12 |
| Catches/stumpings | 6/– |
- Source: Cricinfo, 6 January 2025

Marchant Starr Davies (31 May 1896 – 22 February 1973) was a South African cricketer. He played in 11 first-class matches from 1913/14 to 1926/27. Batting at number eight and opening the bowling, he played for South Africa in their two matches against the Australian Imperial Force Touring XI in 1919–20, taking three wickets.
