= Michael Stonier =

South African cricketer (born 1969)

Personal information
- Born: 9 January 1969 (age 57); East London, South Africa
- Source: Cricinfo, 12 December 2020

Michael Stonier (born 9 January 1969) is a South African cricketer. He played in 30 first-class and 26 List A matches from 1988/89 to 1994/95.
