= Sidney Fuller =

South African cricketer (1888–1966)

Personal information
- Born: 16 April 1888; East London, Cape Colony
- Died: 3 August 1966 (aged 78); East London, South Africa
- Source: Cricinfo, 6 December 2020

Sidney Fuller (16 April 1888 – 3 August 1966) was a South African cricketer. He played in eight first-class matches from 1906/07 to 1934/35.
