= John Beveridge (cricketer) =

South African cricketer

Personal information
- Born: 30 September 1909; Durban, South Africa
- Died: 3 May 1971 (aged 61); Renishaw, South Africa
- Source: Cricinfo, 6 December 2020

John Beveridge (30 September 1909 – 3 May 1971) was a South African cricketer. He played in two first-class matches for Border in 1929/30.

== See also ==
- List of Border representative cricketers
