= Mark Ford (cricketer) =

South African cricketer (born 1961)

Personal information
- Born: 1 October 1961 (age 65); Grahamstown, South Africa
- Source: Cricinfo, 6 December 2020

Mark Ford (born 1 October 1961) is a South African former cricketer. He played in nine List A and twenty-two first-class matches from 1984/85 and 1990/91.
