= Ronnie Randell =

South African cricketer and lawyer

Personal information
- Full name: Rolland Henry Randell
- Born: 15 March 1886; King William's Town, Cape Colony
- Died: 22 October 1978 (aged 92); King William's Town, Cape Province, South Africa
- Role: Batsman, occasional wicket-keeper

Domestic team information
- Years: Team
- 1906–07 to 1925–26: Border

Career statistics
Competition	First-class
Matches	14
Runs scored	225
Batting average	10.22
100s/50s	0/1
Top score	71
Balls bowled	–
Wickets	–
Bowling average	–
5 wickets in innings	–
10 wickets in match	–
Best bowling	–
Catches/stumpings	10/2
- Source: Cricinfo, 22 April 2018

Rolland Henry "Ronnie" Randell (15 March 1886 – 22 October 1978) was a South African first-class cricketer and lawyer.

Ronnie Randell played first-class cricket for Border from 1907 to 1925, usually as a batsman, but sometimes also as a wicket-keeper. His highest score was 71 for Border against the touring MCC in 1913–14, when he shared in an opening partnership of 114 before he was first out.

He spent his whole life in King William's Town. Born there, he was educated there at Dale College, and later practised there as a lawyer for more than 60 years.
