= Ivor Foulkes =

South African cricketer (born 1955)

Personal information
- Born: 22 February 1955 (age 71); Luanshya, Northern Rhodesia
- Source: Cricinfo, 6 December 2020

Ivor Foulkes (born 22 February 1955) is a South African cricketer. He played in 81 first-class and 21 List A matches from 1973/74 to 1987/88.
