= Reginald Richter =

South African cricketer (1914–1965)

Personal information
- Born: 17 October 1914; Engcobo, South Africa
- Died: 10 July 1965 (aged 50); Cape Town, South Africa
- Source: Cricinfo, 12 December 2020

Reginald Richter (17 October 1914 – 10 July 1965) was a South African cricketer. He played in twelve first-class matches from 1933/34 to 1948/49.
