= Craig Stirk =

South African cricketer (born 1957)

Personal information
- Born: 3 August 1957 (age 69); Durban, South Africa
- Source: Cricinfo, 12 December 2020

Craig Stirk (born 3 August 1957) is a South African cricketer. He played in 43 first-class and 34 List A matches from 1979/80 to 1990/91.
