= Angus Small =

South African cricketer (born 1968)

Personal information
- Born: 12 August 1968 (age 58); Durban, South Africa
- Source: Cricinfo, 12 December 2020

Angus Small (born 12 August 1968) is a South African cricketer. He played in twelve first-class and three List A matches from 1989/90 to 1995/96.
