= Malcolm Sylvester =

South African cricketer (born 1939)

Personal information
- Born: 13 December 1939 (age 86); Johannesburg, South Africa
- Source: Cricinfo, 12 December 2020

Malcolm Sylvester (born 13 December 1939) is a South African cricketer. He played in three first-class matches from 1967/68 to 1971/72.
