= Michael Tramontino =

South African cricketer (born 1959)

Personal information
- Born: 4 January 1959 (age 67); Durban, South Africa
- Source: Cricinfo, 12 December 2020

Michael Tramontino (born 4 January 1959) is a South African cricketer. He played in 31 first-class and three List A matches from 1977/78 to 1987/88.
