= Michael Matika =

South African cricketer (born 1983)

Personal information
- Born: 26 April 1983 (age 43); King William's Town, South Africa
- Source: Cricinfo, 12 December 2020

Michael Matika (born 26 April 1983) is a South African former cricketer. He played in 22 first-class and 16 List A matches from 2003 to 2009.
