= Thomas Ball (South African cricketer) =

South African cricketer (born 1951)

Personal information
- Born: 13 February 1951 (age 75); East London, Eastern Cape, South Africa
- Source: ESPNcricinfo, 2 June 2016

Thomas Ball (born 13 February 1951) is a South African former cricketer. He played sixteen first-class matches for Border between 1977 and 1986.
