= Norman Knight (South African cricketer) =

South African cricketer (1946–2010)

Personal information
- Born: 10 December 1946; Port Elizabeth, South Africa
- Died: 22 April 2010 (aged 63); Mauritius
- Source: Cricinfo, 6 December 2020

Norman Knight (10 December 1946 – 22 April 2010) was a South African cricketer. He played in 36 first-class and 5 List A matches for Border from 1966/67 to 1974/75.

== See also ==
- List of Border representative cricketers
