= Christopher Jarvis =

South African cricketer (born 1944)

Personal information
- Born: 22 September 1944 (age 82); Johannesburg, South Africa
- Source: Cricinfo, 6 December 2020

Christopher Jarvis (born 22 September 1944) is a South African cricketer. He played in eight first-class matches from 1974/75 to 1976/77.
