= Peter Muzzell =

South African cricketer (born 1939)

Personal information
- Born: 29 September 1939 (age 87); Stutterheim, South Africa
- Source: Cricinfo, 12 December 2020

Peter Muzzell (born 29 September 1939) is a South African former cricketer. He played in 42 first-class matches for Border from 1957/58 to 1969/70.

== See also ==
- List of Border representative cricketers
