= Gregory Hayes (cricketer) =

South African cricketer (born 1955)

Personal information
- Born: 6 November 1955 (age 71); Queenstown, South Africa
- Source: Cricinfo, 6 December 2020

Gregory Hayes (born 6 November 1955) is a South African former cricketer. He played in 55 first-class and 20 List A matches for Border from 1974/75 to 1987/88.

Hayes is from Queenstown, South Africa. He was awarded the President’s award by former President Thabo Mbeki for his contribution to cricket development. He was also a part of the Dr Krish Mackerdhuj Cricket Academy at the University of Fort Hare.

== See also ==
- List of Border representative cricketers
