= Kenneth Griffith (cricketer) =

South African cricketer (born 1935)

Personal information
- Full name: Kenneth John Griffith
- Born: 14 June 1935; East London, South Africa
- Died: 9 January 2026 (aged 90)
- Batting: Left-handed
- Bowling: Right-arm medium

Domestic team information
- Years: Team
- 1962/63–1964/65: Border
- Source: Cricinfo, 6 December 2020

Kenneth John Griffith (14 June 1935 – 9 January 2026) was a South African cricketer. He played in twelve first-class matches for Border from 1962/63 to 1964/65.

== See also ==
- List of Border representative cricketers
