= Oswald Flemmer =

South African cricketer

Personal information
- Born: 7 January 1907; East London, South Africa
- Died: 14 January 1962 (aged 55); East London, South Africa
- Source: Cricinfo, 6 December 2020

Oswald Flemmer (7 January 1907 – 14 January 1962) was a South African cricketer. He played in twenty-four first-class matches from 1925/26 to 1934/35.
