= Leslie Fuhri =

South African cricketer (born 1965)

Personal information
- Born: 22 October 1965 (age 61); Pietermaritzburg, South Africa
- Source: Cricinfo, 6 December 2020

Leslie Fuhri (born 22 October 1965) is a South African cricketer. He played in seventeen first-class matches from 1986/87 to 1995/96.
