= Terence Groves =

South African cricketer (born 1950)

Personal information
- Born: 27 September 1950 (age 76); Stutterheim, South Africa
- Source: Cricinfo, 6 December 2020

Terence Groves (born 27 September 1950) is a South African former cricketer. He played in one List A and eight first-class matches from 1968/69 to 1976/77.
