= Karl Bauermeister =

South African cricketer (born 1963)

Karl Bauermeister (born 28 January 1963) from Port Elizabeth, South Africa, was a right-handed batsman and a decent allrounder during the 1980s. He played provincial one-matches representing the Eastern Cape. He played with several Springbok players, both as a junior and at provincial cricket.

A multi talented sportsman, Karl also represented South African Schools in soccer in 1979.
