= Gordon Cross (cricketer) =

South African cricketer (1886–1961)

Personal information
- Born: 4 December 1886; King William's Town, Cape Province, South Africa
- Died: 1 June 1961 (aged 74); East London, Cape Province, South Africa
- Source: Cricinfo, 6 December 2020

Gordon Cross (4 December 1886 – 1 June 1961) was a South African cricketer. He played in thirteen first-class matches for Border from 1903/04 and 1922/23.

== See also ==
- List of Border representative cricketers
