= Lwando Manase =

South African cricketer (born 1984)

Personal information
- Born: 27 December 1984 (age 41); King William's Town, South Africa
- Batting: Right-handed
- Bowling: Right-arm Fast
- Role: All-rounder
- Source: Cricinfo, 12 December 2020

Lwando Manase (born 27 December 1984) is a South African former cricketer. He played in one first-class and one List A match for Border in 2005. His batting style is Right-Hand bat and his bowling style is Right-Arm Fast.
