= Ralph Cullinan =

South African cricketer (born 1965)

Personal information
- Born: 14 November 1965 (age 60); Kimberley, South Africa
- Source: Cricinfo, 6 December 2020

Ralph Cullinan (born 14 November 1965) is a South African cricketer. He played in sixteen first-class and five List A matches from 1984/85 to 1992/93.
