= Michael Dilley (South African cricketer) =

South African cricketer (born 1970)

Personal information
- Born: 12 April 1970 (age 56); Queenstown, South Africa
- Source: Cricinfo, 6 December 2020

Michael Dilley (born 12 April 1970) is a South African former cricketer. He played in two List A matches for Border in 1991/92 and 1992/93.

== See also ==
- List of Border representative cricketers
