= Peter Haxton =

South African cricketer (1941–2022)

Personal information
- Full name: Alfred Peter Haxton
- Born: 25 July 1941; Springfontein, South Africa
- Died: 21 October 2022 (aged 81); Queenstown, South Africa
- Batting: Right-handed

Domestic team information
- Years: Team
- 1963/64–1974/75: Border
- Source: Cricinfo, 6 December 2020

Alfred Peter Haxton (25 July 1941 – 21 October 2022) was a South African cricketer. He played in 33 first-class and 3 List A matches for Border from 1963/64 to 1974/75.
