= Roger Moult =

South African cricketer (born 1963)

Personal information
- Born: 1 May 1963 (age 63); Kimberley, South Africa
- Source: Cricinfo, 12 December 2020

Roger Moult (born 1 May 1963) is a South African cricketer. He played in nine first-class matches from 1980/81 to 1989/90.
