= Brendan Horan (cricketer) =

South African cricketer (born 1974)

Personal information
- Born: 17 September 1974 (age 52); Cape Town, South Africa
- Source: Cricinfo, 6 December 2020

Brendan Horan (born 17 September 1974) is a South African cricketer. He played in eleven first-class and twelve List A matches from 1995/96 to 2000/01.
