= Dudley Bowen (cricketer) =

South African cricketer

Personal information
- Born: 26 September 1903; East London, Cape Colony
- Died: 9 March 1972 (aged 68); East London, South Africa
- Source: Cricinfo, 6 December 2020

Dudley Bowen (26 September 1903 – 9 March 1972) was a South African cricketer. He played in one first-class match for Border in 1925/26.

== See also ==
- List of Border representative cricketers
