= William Hards =

South African cricketer

Personal information
- Born: 25 March 1907; Keiskammahoek, South Africa
- Died: 6 July 1971 (aged 64); Salisbury, Rhodesia
- Source: Cricinfo, 6 December 2020

William Hards (25 March 1907 – 6 July 1971) was a South African cricketer. He played in nine first-class matches from 1926/27 to 1928/29.
