= Viyusa Makhaphela =

South African cricketer (born 1986)

Personal information
- Born: 20 December 1986 (age 39); Alice, South Africa
- Source: Cricinfo, 12 December 2020

Viyusa Makhaphela (born 20 December 1986) is a South African cricketer. He played in 43 first-class, 12 List A, and 6 Twenty20 matches from 2006 to 2015.
