= Michael Smith (South African cricketer) =

South African cricketer (born 1980)

Personal information
- Full name: Michael Bruce Argo Smith
- Born: 5 May 1980 (age 46); King William's Town, South Africa
- Batting: Right-handed
- Bowling: Right-arm Medium, Right-arm Offbreak

Domestic team information
- Years: Team
- Border (squad no. 3168)
- Eastern Province (squad no. 3208)
- Warriors (squad no. 3353)
- Source: Cricinfo, 12 December 2020

Michael Bruce Argo Smith (born 5 May 1980) is a South African cricketer. He played in 89 first-class, 72 List A, and 16 Twenty20 matches from 2003 to 2013.
