= Alec Bedser (South African cricketer) =

South African cricketer (1948–1981)

Personal information
- Born: 20 May 1948; East London, South Africa
- Died: 5 June 1981 (aged 33); Randburg, South Africa
- Source: Cricinfo, 6 December 2020

Alec Bedser (20 May 1948 – 5 June 1981) was a South African cricketer. He played in one List A and three first-class matches for Border in 1971/72. He was killed in a road accident, aged 33.

== See also ==
- List of Border representative cricketers
