= Neil Boonzaaier =

South African cricketer (born 1956)

Personal information
- Born: 30 April 1956 (age 70); Cape Town, South Africa
- Source: Cricinfo, 6 December 2020

Neil Boonzaaier (born 30 April 1956) is a South African cricketer. He played in twenty-two first-class and eight List A matches from 1983/84 to 1990/91.
