= Sithembile Makongolo =

South African cricketer (born 1985)

Personal information
- Born: 21 April 1985 (age 41); Middledrift, South Africa
- Source: Cricinfo, 12 December 2020

Sithembile Makongolo (born 21 April 1985) is a South African cricketer. He played in eight first-class and four List A matches from 2004 to 2010.
