= Willie Els =

South African cricketer (born 1958)

Personal information
- Born: 23 June 1958 (age 68); East London, South Africa
- Source: Cricinfo, 6 December 2020

Willie Els (born 23 June 1958) is a South African cricketer. He played in nine first-class matches in 1977/78 and 1978/79.
