= Wayne Wiblin =

South African cricketer (born 1969)

Personal information
- Born: 13 February 1969 (age 57); Grahamstown, South Africa
- Source: Cricinfo, 12 December 2020

Wayne Wiblin (born 13 February 1969) is a South African former cricketer. He played in 44 first-class and 43 List A matches from 1991/92 to 2001/02.
