= Ian Lloyd (cricketer) =

South African cricketer (1938–2009)

Personal information
- Born: 3 February 1938; Alice, South Africa
- Died: 5 February 2009 (aged 71); Port Alfred, South Africa
- Source: Cricinfo, 6 December 2020

Ian Lloyd (3 February 1938 – 5 February 2009) was a South African cricketer. He played in one first-class match for Border in 1956/57.

== See also ==
- List of Border representative cricketers
