= Harold Minkley =

South African cricketer

Personal information
- Born: 6 February 1907; King William's Town, South Africa
- Died: 29 June 2005 (aged 98); Paarl, South Africa
- Source: Cricinfo, 12 December 2020

Harold Minkley (6 February 1907 – 29 June 2005) was a South African cricketer. He played in three first-class matches from 1935/36 to 1950/51.
