= Jack Muzzell =

South African cricketer

Personal information
- Born: 29 August 1905; Stutterheim, South Africa
- Died: 11 August 1996 (aged 90); Stutterheim, South Africa
- Source: Cricinfo, 12 December 2020

Jack Muzzell (29 August 1905 – 11 August 1996) was a South African cricketer. He played in nineteen first-class matches for Border from 1928/29 to 1934/35.

== See also ==
- List of Border representative cricketers
