= Henry Londt =

South African cricketer (1879–1947)

Personal information
- Born: 5 December 1879; Cape Town, Cape Colony
- Died: 25 August 1947 (aged 67); Cape Town, South Africa
- Source: Cricinfo, 6 December 2020

Henry Londt (5 December 1879 – 25 August 1947) was a South African cricketer. He played in ten first-class matches between 1903/04 and 1910/11.
