= List of Northerns representative cricketers =

This is a partial list of cricketers who have played first-class, List A cricket, or Twenty20 cricket for North Eastern Transvaal, Northern Transvaal and Northerns in South Africa. The team was renamed Northerns ahead of the 1996–97 season following the renaming of Transvaal province to Gauteng in 1994.

North Eastern Transvaal made its senior debut in the Currie Cup in 1937–38 and from 1946 to 1947 played regularly in the competition. The team first played List A cricket in 1970–71, the first season of provincial List A cricket in South Africa. (Note: The 1969–70 Gillette Cup competition had taken place the previous season, but teams did not use their provincial names. The team that represented North Eastern Transvaal was organised by Jackie Botten and known as JT Botten's XI. It played one match. All 11 players who appeared for this team also played matches for North Eastern Transvaal so, by default, appear on this list.)

The team was renamed as Northern Transvaal ahead of the 1971–72 season and then as Northerns ahead of the 1996–97 season, continuing to play first-class and List A cricket throughout this period. Northern Transvaal B played in the first-class Currie Cup Bowl competition from 1981 to 1982, with Northerns B playing in the same competition in 1997–98 and 1998–99, the final seasons of the Bowl competition. Northerns played its first domestic Twenty20 cricket in the first season of the CSA Provincial T20 in 2011–12.

This list includes the players who played first-class and List A cricket for North Eastern Transvaal between 1937–38 and 1970–71, for Northern Transvaal and Northern Transvaal B between 1971–72 and 1995–96, and those who played first-class, List A, and Twenty20 cricket for Northerns and Northerns B from 1996–97 to the present day. It does not include players who appeared only for franchise team Titans which was operated by the Northerns and Easterns Cricket Unions between 2003–04 and 2020–21. (Note: The players who played for the franchise team are listed at List of Titans cricketers.)

== A ==
- Glen Abbott
- Shafiek Abrahams
- Clifford Abrams
- Qaasim Adams
- Andrea Agathangelou
- Roger Arendse
- Robert Armitage
- Maurice Aronstam

== B ==
- Rupert Bailey
- Kulani Baloyi
- Pieter Barnard
- Peter Barrable
- Danzel Becker
- Farhaan Behardien
- Darryl Bestall
- Joseph Blewett
- Ernest Bock
- Corbin Bosch
- Tertius Bosch
- Jackie Botten
- Geoffrey Boycott
- Neil Brand
- Merrick Brett
- Dewald Brevis
- Eric Brotherton
- Nigel Brouwers
- Lennox Brown
- Thomas Bryant
- Rudi Bryson
- David Bunn
- Sydney Burke

== C ==
- Phil Carrick
- Ryan Cartwright
- Okuhle Cele
- Robert Chalmers
- Neetan Chouhan
- Ruben Claassen
- Sylvester Clarke
- Russell Cobb
- Howard Cooper
- Peter Corbett
- Gerald Cresswell
- Vernon Cresswell
- Thomas Cullinan

== D ==
- Eric Davies
- Mark Davis
- Pierre de Bruyn
- Theunis de Bruyn
- Quinton de Kock
- Aubrey Dennis
- Ruan de Swardt
- Peter de Vaal
- AB de Villiers
- Fanie de Villiers
- Juan de Villiers
- Friedel de Wet
- Tony de Zorzi
- Sean Dickson
- Dereck Dowling
- Gerald Dros
- Faf du Plessis
- Leus du Plooy
- Jacobus du Toit

== E ==
- Ronald Edwards
- Allan Elgar
- Steve Elworthy
- Sybrand Engelbrecht

== F ==
- Rodney Falkson
- Norman Featherstone
- Anton Ferreira
- Donovan Ferreira
- Quentin Ferreira
- Ken Funston
- James Furstenburg

== G ==
- Laden Gamiet
- Stuart Gardiner
- Redmund Geach
- Trevor Goddard
- Jarred Goncalves-Jardine
- Ayabulela Gqamane
- Chad Grainger

== H ==
- Glen Hall
- Simon Harmer
- Paul Harris
- Eldred Hawken
- Mike Haysman
- Albert Heffer
- Peter Heine
- Dudley Helfrich
- Kenneth Helfrich
- William Henderson
- Rubin Hermann
- Mackie Hobson
- Murray Hofmeyr
- Simon Hughes

== I ==
- Imran Tahir
- John Inchmore

== J ==
- Rushdi Jappie
- Christopher Jarvis
- Kenneth Jennings
- Alan Jones
- Allan Jones
- Evan Jones
- Pierre Joubert

== K ==
- Thomas Kaber
- Justin Kemp
- Lerato Kgoatle
- Reon King
- Cecil Kirton
- Heinrich Klaasen
- Stefan Klopper
- Tumi Koto
- Murray Krug
- Heino Kuhn

== L ==
- Clayton Lambert
- Tiger Lance
- Brian Lara
- Nigel Leathern
- Denis Lindsay
- Johnny Lindsay
- Eden Links

== M ==
- Mike Macaulay
- Neil McKenzie
- Victor Mahlangu
- Gregory Mahlokwana
- Sibonelo Makhanya
- Wandile Makwetu
- Andre Malan
- Heinrich Malan
- Pieter Malan
- Aiden Markram
- Thomas Mashiane
- Mandla Mashimbyi
- Gordon Middlewick
- Dalen Mmako
- Sammy Mofokeng
- Rivaldo Moonsamy
- Grant Morgan
- Albie Morkel
- Willie Morris
- Itumaleng Moseki
- Ezra Moseley
- Alfred Mothoa
- Johann Myburgh
- Stephan Myburgh

== N ==
- Lepono Ndhlovu
- Phil Newport
- Lungi Ngidi
- Luvuyo Nkese
- David Nosworthy
- Sean Nowak

== O ==
- Chris Old
- Rodney Ontong

== P ==
- Allahudien Paleker
- Gideon Peters
- Alviro Petersen
- Aaron Phangiso
- Cobus Pienaar
- Jiveshan Pillay
- Anthony Pollock
- Jim Pressdee
- Lhuan-dre Pretorius
- Migael Pretorius

== Q ==
- Trevor Quirk

== R ==
- Andrew Rasemene
- Lindsay Reid-Ross
- Rowan Richards
- Dave Richardson
- John Richardson
- Richie Richardson
- Ronald Richardson
- Norman Riley
- Michael Rindel
- Paul Robinson
- Diego Rosier
- Anton Roux
- Jacques Rudolph

== S ==
- Ruan Sadler
- Kenneth Saggers
- Phillimon Selowa
- Dewald Senekal
- Andre Seymore
- Archibald Sim
- Eric Simons
- Dennis Smith
- Greg Smith
- Raymond Smith
- Dylan Stanley
- Sidney Stanley
- Barry Stead
- Dale Steyn
- Godfrey Steyn
- Rudi Steyn
- Bill Steytler
- Quentin Still
- Craig Stirk
- Pat Symcox

== T ==
- Arthur Tayfield
- Alfonso Thomas
- David Thomas
- Grant Thomson
- Ruben Trumpelmann
- Pierre Tullis
- Graeme Turner

== U ==
- Phillip Uren

== V ==
- Pite van Biljon
- Mitchell Van Buuren
- Rassie van der Dussen
- Roelof van der Merwe
- Martin van Jaarsveld
- Kiel van Vollenhoven
- Kruger van Wyk
- Dan van Zyl
- Kevin Verdoorn
- Leon Vlok
- Shaun von Berg
- Louis Vorster

== W ==
- Neil Wagner
- Kenny Watson
- Howard Watt
- Francois Weideman
- Leslie Wenzler
- Kepler Wessels
- Brian Whitfield
- Lizaad Williams
- Bob Willis
- Hugh Wilson

== Y ==
- Mandy Yachad
