= Johannesburg Reformed Church (GKSA) =

Church congregation in Johannesburg, South Africa

The Johannesburg Reformed Church (GKSA) was the second congregation of the Reformed Churches in Southern Africa (GKSA) on the Witwatersrand after the Krugersdorp Reformed Church (GKSA), founded only a month earlier.

On April 1, 1943, the congregation merged with the Johannesburg West Reformed Church (GKSA) (founded on December 13, 1930) and took on the latter's name. On October 22, 1950, Johannesburg West re-seceded and the main Johannesburg congregation was restored, and in 1952 it was renamed to Johannesburg-Mayfair. In 1986, Johannesburg-Mayfair, the Johannesburg East Reformed Church (GKSA) (founded February 29, 1924), and the Johannesburg Central Reformed Church all merged under the Johannesburg Reformed Church (restored) banner, but most of the suburbs that had been part of Johannesburg-Melville stayed in Johannesburg West. In 1997, Johannesburg-Melville was reformed from a merger of Johannesburg (restored) and the Johannesburg North Reformed Church (GKSA) (founded on March 1, 1924). In 1998, Johannesburg West and the Delarey Reformed Church merged as the Bergbron Reformed Church. Finally, Johannesburg-Melville was absorbed by the Randburg Reformed Church (GKSA) in 2002, joined by the Randburg East Reformed Church the following year.

== Background ==
The many GKSA members in the Johannesburg area had no congregation of their own for 10 years after the city's foundation in 1886. A pastor from Pretoria served the area, where a number of members purchased a few farms on Mint Road in Fordsburg to build a church for £719. This church was destroyed by a dynamite explosion on February 19, 1896, but the Relief Committee paid the congregation £750 in compensation.

The General Conference of the Transvaal GKSA on March 16–17, 1896 in Heidelberg authorized the secession of Krugersdorp and Johannesburg congregations from the Rustenburg Reformed Church (GKSA). On April 25, Krugersdorp's formal foundation ceremony was attended by the Rev. Johannes de Ridder, elders H.P. Steyn and Ammi Venter (Rustenburg); and the Rev. J.L. Murray and elders J.A. Bezuidenhout and G.A. van der Walt (Potchefstroom).

The Rev. P.S. Snyman of Heidelberg was chosen as the consulent. Elder S. Potgieter, assigned by the church council to buy farms from the government for a church building, acquired two plots: Vrye Gunst near what is now Piet Retief and Nooitgedacht in the Rustenburg area. Plots 15-17 and 136 were thus bought from the South African Republic (ZAR) government in October 1899. In May 1904, the eight-year-old congregation finally had a functioning church and parsonage, but financial troubles still dogged it, and the Krugersdorp council meeting of October 20, 1896, already fielded requests to remerge with the Johannesburg congregation.

== Johannesburg congregation founding ==
The Johannesburg congregation was established with 200 confirmed charter members on May 23, 1896. The general conference authorizing its foundation was attended, other than the aforementioned, by the Rev. Petrus Postma and elders R. Turkstra and P.P. Jordaan (absent upon notice) of the Pretoria Reformed Church (GKSA) and the Rev. Snyman (consulent of Krugersdorp) and elders S.J.S. du Preez and W.H. Ackermann.

Its size is shown by the founding charter's article 4: “The Johannesburg congregation includes members living in the following farms and towns: Boksburg, Elandsfontein, Germiston, Rietfontein, Jeppestown, Doornfontein, Braamfontein, Johannesburg, Ophirton, Turffontein, Booysens, Langlaagte, Maraisburg, Florida, [and] Auckland Park.” The congregation was divided into four districts led by the following brothers: Tjaart van der Walt, Jacob Petrus Kruger, Petrus Carolus Duvenhage, and Johannes Coetsee (elders); and Johannes Lodewikus Venter, Pieter Stoker, Andries Gerhardus Nienaber, and Louis Stephanus Steyn (deacons).

The first pastor candidate interviewed, Rev. Snyman, declined, but the Rev. Marthinus Postma accepted and was invested on August 28, 1897. Church and parsonage construction were the main struggles during the local land rush, and the land of the former first church on Mint Road was no exception, ultimately sold with the sites in Fordsburg for £1,050.

The rebuilt second church near the old site was built during the lifetime of the Rev. Willem Johannes de Klerk (1875-1943) and would be sold after the Rev. Postma's death in 1926. It served the congregation until the 1930 merger with Johannesburg West. By 1897, the Johannesburg congregation had 350 confirmed and 700 baptized members.

At the outbreak of the Second Boer War in 1899, members from Benoni, Brakpan, and Springs also attended the Johannesburg services, giving the Rev. Postma an area stretching around 70 mi (more than 110 km) from Randfontein to Springs. The need for a second pastor had to await the end of the war, though the third GKSA congregation on the Rand was founded in 1905 in Germiston.

== War years ==
At the September 9, 1899 church council meeting in Krugersdorp, Rev. Postma and Eld. S. Potgieter agreed to consider the “extraordinary local conditions in light of the war between England and these Republics” while planning communion services for the second Sunday in October. According to the notes, “the pastor also proposed home visits for October, but the Church Council rendered this impractical.” At the December 2, 1899 meeting, half the council was absent as were “many of the brethren” in the congregation on the battlefield. The notes started in article 2 that “the pastor expounded on the war that had broken out in the month of October between England and the two Republics – the South African Republic and the Orange Free State.”

The council decided to have congregation members appointed to serve in the stead of enlisted councilors. However, these could rarely be secured, and there would be no meetings between March 30, 1900 and November 8, 1901, while the Rev. Postma would not return until June 2, 1903. Some congregation members became POWs in Ceylon and Portugal. Among those was the Rev. Postma, who was released on parole after more than two years of captivity, but he stayed in East London to support his family teaching.

“By the grace of God’s benevolence,” as the council notes put it, the Rev. Dirk Postma, Jr. of Rustenburg was on hand in Krugersdorp to minister to the locals as well as prisoners at the concentration camp in town, who hailed from Pretoria, Griqualand West, Heidelberg, and Rustenburg. The Krugersdorp council lent money to internees, beginning to donate it outright as conditions deteriorated. Rev. Marthinus Postma, however, was sent abroad for refusing a loyalty oath.

The December 27, 1902 council notes report:

The pastor asked the brother elders as the year neared an end if spiritual life in the church made progress, stagnated, or declined. A wide-ranging, quiet, serious discussion ensued. The elders concluded that the rod of war had made some more humble and receptive to the word of the Lord and salvation in Jesus Christ. However, the elders also generally concluded that the spiritual state of the congregation left much to be desired. Spiritual life could not possibly withstand such heavy divine wrath as the recent war; worldly and frivolous pursuits tempt many in this seductive world, and there is not enough love and unity among the worshipers themselves or that fire and zeal and interest in the affairs of God's eternal kingdom that should be there.

In dire financial straits, the church sold valuable possessions. Only the taxes could be paid on the new church building of the Johannesburg congregation when it opened in 1903. Banks ran low, and while farms burned and livestock grew lean, city-dwellers made meager wages save for a few of the miners crawling deep underground in dry, unventilated mines.

The Transvaal Colony Repatriation department offered a £1,200 loan to the congregation, which was rejected at the January 26, 1904 meeting as shifting government obligations onto the church. After the war, people moved in greater numbers to cities, particularly Johannesburg, once more. This grew the congregation to the point where the building on Mint Road (south of Main Street) had become too small and was sold for £3,000, to be replaced in 1903 by the edifice north of Main (now Albertina Sisulu Road) costing £3,750.

== Growth years ==
At the beginning of 1904, the Krugersdorp-Johannesburg merger came to an end. On January 14, 1905, Dirk Postma of the Burgersdorp Theological Seminary, the eldest son of Rev. M. Postma, was invested by his father as pastor of Krugersdorp. 16 months later, however, the younger Rev. Postma left to head the Burgersdorp Reformed Church (GKSA). His cousin Dirk du Plessis (likewise a grandson of the elder Dirk Postma) became consulent for several years and later pastor in Krugersdorp. In 1904, the Rev. M. Postma left the Rand for Pretoria, replaced by the Rev. De Klerk (Heidelberg Seminary, 1903-1904), who also served as consulent in Krugersdorp along with Totius after the latter left Potchefstroom.

In 1907, Rev. De Klerk left for the Aliwal North Reformed Church (GKSA), and in 1908 the Krugersdorp congregation was folded into the Johannesburg one once more. After many interviews, the Rev. M. Postma (who had since moved from Pretoria to the Waterberg Reformed Church (GKSA)) returned for a second stint to end an 18-month vacancy, serving this time until his death. He served Krugersdorp until the final and permanent separation in 1910.

Further expansion forced the Transvaal General Conference to found a third congregation, Germiston, in March 1905. The first consulent, the Rev. H.J.R. du Plessis, had spent 11 years serving Germiston and Bethal after the Rev. J.C. van der Walt was hired.

Afrikaners made up an increasing share of the local mining workforce from 1909 onward, thus swelling the ranks of the GKSA on the Rand. At the outbreak of World War I in 1914, tensions ran high and many members ended up in prisons and camps or paying fines for participating in armed uprisings.

== The arrival of the Rev. J.V. Coetzee ==
In June 1915, proponent J.V. Coetzee became the curate of Johannesburg. He described his acclimation there as follows:

I had accepted the position of curate of Johannesburg and came to start work in June 1915, just after a frenzied mob there had looted and burned German stores and businesses, intercepted subsequently by a pickaxe- and club-wielding assembly of Boer commandoes by the subway station. Many of the congregation members were in that militia protecting the Fordsburg-Vrededorp line, and continued to keep a close eye on things.

In December 1918, after several interviews with other applicants, Rev. Coetzee was invested as co-pastor of Johannesburg, a rarity in the GKSA necessitated by the unique conditions in town. There was precedent in the Netherlands, however. The Rev. Coetzee stated: “as far as I know, it was the first time in the history of our church that a congregation had two pastors, except for the early years of the Seminary in Burgersdorp when one of them was a school docent reimbursed by the congregation for part of his salary.”

There were thus now four pastors on the Rand, including the two in Johannesburg and the ones in Krugersdorp and Germiston. From 1919–1923, the Rev. J.H. Boneschans served as pastor of Germiston, succeeding J.C. van der Walt after the latter left for the Piet Retief Reformed Church (GKSA). The Germiston congregation now covered the entire East Rand from Germiston to near Springs. The peaceful cooperation of the four pastors (the Revs. M. Postma, D.P. du Plessis, Coetzee, and Boneschans), their council colleagues, and the congregations at large belied tensions that arose once more at the end of 1921.

== The Rand Rebellion ==
The Rand Rebellion of 1922 had a major impact on the congregations of the Rand. The Rev. Coetzee, an eyewitness to the Rebellion, wrote the following:

The widespread labor unrest in 1921 that culminated in 1922 in armed conflict on the streets of Johannesburg greatly disrupted church life on the Witwatersrand. Many members spent months out of work, and church finances were severely strained. Collections fell sharply and pastors’ estates fell into arrears. When the dust settled, a large share of the congregation was in prison or interned in Wanderers Stadium. Nearly all males in Fordsburg, Vrededorp, and Newlands were held on that cricket ground. Authorities spent days apprehending people.

Heavily tried by the crisis, the Germiston congregation took on the Rev. D. Rumpff of the Heidelberg Reformed Church (GKSA) as co-pastor. From 1924–1927, the Rev. Philippus de Klerk worked in Germiston, since the Rev. Boneschans had left for the Venterstad Reformed Church.

== Founding of new congregations ==
The western suburbs of Johannesburg were showing significant growth, including the founding of new districts, just as much as the East Rand. The Johannesburg East and North congregations seceded at the beginning of 1924 under the joint pastorate of Rev. Coetzee while Rev. M. Postma continued to lead the mother church until his death in 1926, when he was replaced by Rev. W.J. de Klerk for the second time.

At the beginning of 1925, Johannesburg East and North got their own pastors, East sharing Rev. T.T. Spoelstra with Bethal and North hiring F.P.J. Snyman away from the Molteno Reformed Church (GKSA). The Rev. Snyman would work at Johannesburg North until his death on August 15, 1945.

Two more congregations arose on the Rand in 1926, namely the Brakpan Reformed Church (GKSA) on the East Rand and the Vereeniging Reformed Church (GKSA) westward, the latter of which would eventually be considered part of the Rand Ring. Four years later, in 1930, arose the Johannesburg South Reformed Church (GKSA) and Johannesburg West; in 1935, so did the Benoni Reformed Church (GKSA) and the Springs Reformed Church (GKSA); in 1936 came the Boksburg Reformed Church (GKSA); in 1938 followed Delmas Reformed Church (GKSA), another Rand Ring congregation; and 1939's foundation of the Alberton Reformed Church (GKSA) and 1942's establishment of the Florida Reformed Church (GKSA) rounded out the pre-war set. From 1950 to 1954, the following joined them: the Buffeldoorns Reformed Church (1949); the Linden Reformed Church (GKSA) (1950); the Randfontein Reformed Church (GKSA) (1950); the Vanderbijlpark Reformed Church (GKSA) (1951); the Carleton Reformed Church and Johannesburg Central Reformed Church (1953); the Delarey Reformed Church (1954); and the Krugersdorp West Reformed Church (GKSA) (1954).

== Church operations ==
Concerned with reports of declining attendance in the GKSA area, Rev. Spoelstra began emphasizing missionary work, first enlisting the local Dorcas society to distribute more literature in hospitals. At a meeting of the General Conference of Rand Missionaries in 1929, concerns were raised that non-GKSA literature was being distributed while the Church itself remained “silent on our Reformed principles.” Unchurched Afrikaners thus remained a major concern.

Therefore, the Johannesburg Central congregation was founded in 1952 in the city center to, in its founders’ words, “actively evangelize among the stray children of the covenant who have lost all contact with the church in the impersonal city spirit.” Poor attendance of members there remained a major concern, however, at around 27% for morning services and 15% for evening ones.

The GKSA actively pursued missionary work elsewhere on the Rand. Starting in 1950, Rev. Hugo du Plessis, missionary pastor of Johannesburg North, ministered to the black townships west of the city. Other area congregations supported the work, as did the Rev. J.A. Schutte of Johannesburg North. In 1955, the Moroka missionary congregation already boasted 515 members. The Rev. Du Plessis, who would be succeeded by Rev. P.G. Geertsema, began training black pastors and assistants in January 1956, leading to the foundation of the independent Dube congregation in November 1957.

== Congregations past and present ==
The following 11 GKSA congregations have existed in the Johannesburg area:

1. Johannesburg (-Mayfair, -Melville, 1896, 1986)
2. Johannesburg North (1924)
3. Johannesburg East (1924)
4. Johannesburg West (1930, 1986)
5. Johannesburg South (1931)
6. Linden (1950)
7. Johannesburg Central (1952)
8. Delarey (1954)
9. Randburg Reformed Church (GKSA) (1960)
10. Randburg East Reformed Church (1976)
11. Midrand Reformed Church (1999)

The following 5 remain:

1. Johannesburg South
2. Linden
3. Bergbron Reformed Church (1998, including the former Johannesburg West, Delarey, and the Melville portion of Johannesburg-Melville)
4. Midrand
5. Randburg (April 14, 2003, including the rest of Johannesburg-Melville and all of the former Johannesburg North, Johannesburg East, Johannesburg Central, Randburg, and Randburg East)

== See also ==
- Johannesburg Reformed Church (NGK)

== Sources ==
- Harris, C.T.; Noëth, J.G.; Sarkady, N.G.; Schutte, F.M.; and Van Tonder, J.M. (2010). Van seringboom tot kerkgebou: die argitektoniese erfenis van die Gereformeerde Kerke. Potchefstroom: Administratiewe Buro.
- Kruger, Dr. B.R. (1956). Die ontstaan, ontwikkeling en betekenis van die Gereformeerde Kerk op die Witwatersrand. Pretoria: Craft Drukpers.
- Stals, Prof. Dr. E.L.P. (ed.) (1986). Afrikaners in die Goudstad, vol. 2: 1924–1961. Pretoria: HAUM Opvoedkundige Uitgewery.
