= Keaton Jennings =

English cricketer (born 1992)

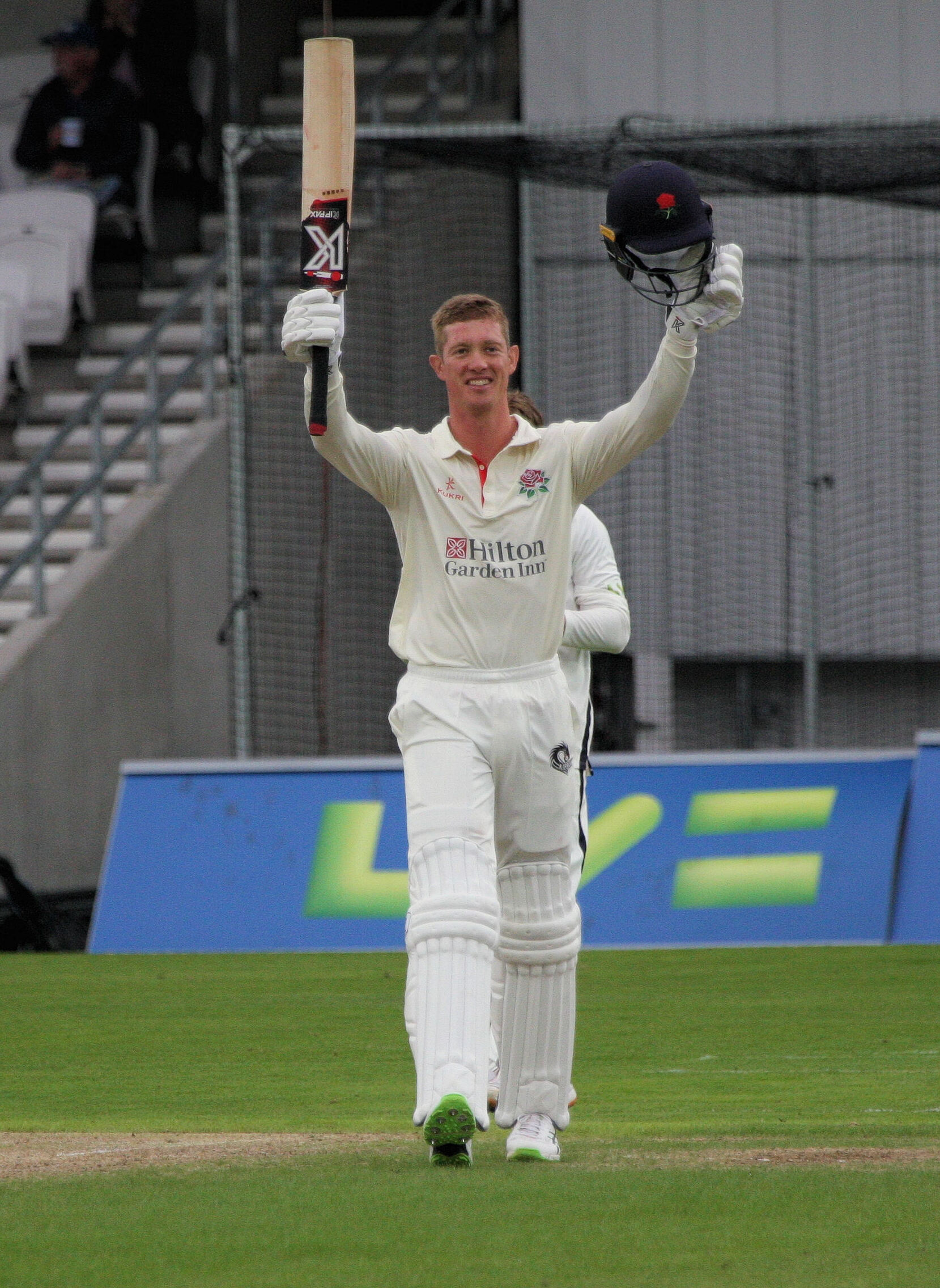
- Jennings celebrates after reaching a century for Lancashire in 2021

Personal information
- Full name: Keaton Kent Jennings
- Born: 19 June 1992 (age 34); Johannesburg, Transvaal Province, South Africa
- Height: 6 ft 2 in (1.88 m)
- Batting: Left-handed
- Bowling: Right-arm medium-fast
- Role: Opening batsman Club captain
- Relatives: Ray Jennings (father); Kenneth Jennings (uncle); Dylan Jennings (brother)

International information
- National side: England (2016–2019)
- Test debut (cap 675): 8 December 2016 v India
- Last Test: 9 February 2019 v West Indies

Domestic team information
- Years: Team
- 2011/12: Gauteng
- 2012–2017: Durham (squad no. 1)
- 2018–present: Lancashire (squad no. 1)
- 2024–2025: London Spirit (squad no. 1)
- 2024/25: Perth Scorchers

Career statistics
Competition	Test	FC	LA	T20
Matches	17	213	101	132
Runs scored	781	13,106	3,894	2,727
Batting average	25.19	38.32	47.48	29.96
100s/50s	2/1	33/53	10/22	1/12
Top score	146*	318	156	108
Balls bowled	73	1,761	690	510
Wickets	0	30	11	22
Bowling average	–	32.93	60.90	28.54
5 wickets in innings	–	0	0	0
10 wickets in match	–	0	0	0
Best bowling	–	3/37	2/19	4/37
Catches/stumpings	17/–	208/–	45/–	43/–
- Source: Cricinfo, 27 September 2026

Keaton Kent Jennings (born 19 June 1992) is a South African-born English cricketer who captains Lancashire County Cricket Club and has represented England.

He is a left-handed opening batsman who also bowls right-arm medium-fast. He made his international debut for England in December 2016.

== Early life ==
Jennings was born in Johannesburg, but also holds British citizenship through his mother, who was born in Sunderland. His father, Ray Jennings, played first-class cricket in South Africa from 1973/4 to 1992/3, with most of his playing career during the anti-apartheid sporting boycott of South Africa. Other first-class cricketers in the family include Jennings's uncle Kenneth Jennings and his older brother Dylan Jennings, who both played in South Africa.

== Domestic career ==
Jennings spent the 2011 season in Durham, playing for Academy and Second XI teams. He made his first-class debut for Gauteng in December 2011 against Free State. He also played for the South Africa Under-19 cricket team, and was captain of the Under-19 team on its tour to England in 2011.

Although eligible to play for South Africa, Jennings chose to play international cricket for England, and played his last game for Gauteng in March 2012. He arrived in England on 2 April 2012, meaning that he became eligible for England selection in April 2016 after a four-year residency period (the necessary period was raised to seven years just a few weeks after he arrived in England). He played Second XI cricket for Durham in 2012, and made his first team debut against Surrey in August 2012. Playing against Derbyshire in July 2013, he scored his maiden first-class century (123) in the second innings after reaching 93 in the first innings. He reached a second first-class century in the final match of the 2013 season, against Sussex, when Durham had already won the 2013 County Championship (Durham's third title in six years) but he made less impact in the following two seasons.

Jennings had a successful season for Durham in 2016, scoring heavily with the bat, becoming the leading run-scorer, with 1,548 runs at a batting average of 64.5, including six centuries plus a double century against Yorkshire, and scoring 88 in the final of the 2016 NatWest T20 Blast competition. Jennings was selected as the County Championship player of the year by the Cricket Writers' Club, and joined the England Lions tour to the United Arab Emirates. Jennings was linked with a move away from Durham due to the club's financial problems, but eventually agreed a new deal to stay at the club. Following his impressive form for Durham, and scoring a century on tour for the Lions, Jennings was called up to the senior England squad for the first time.

On 27 August 2020, on the opening day of the 2020 t20 Blast, Jennings scored his first century in a T20 match against his former side, Durham, scoring 108 runs from 63 balls. The innings is the highest score in a T20 match at Chester-le-Street.

On 28 May 2021, Jennings completed his maiden Roses Hundred for Lancashire in the match against Yorkshire at Old Trafford. In July 2022, Jennings scored his maiden triple century in first-class cricket, with 318 runs against Somerset. He had the highest run total of any batsman in the 2022 County Championship Division One and won the Fans Player of the Season award. In the absence of then club captain Dane Vilas, who was recovering from an injured finger, Jennings would captain Lancashire in the 2022 Royal London One-Day Cup. Under his captaincy, Lancashire would reach the final but fall just short of victory in the final against Kent.

Ahead of the 2023 season, Jennings was announced as the new captain of Lancashire in all three formats. His first game as permanent captain of Lancashire came against Surrey on 6 April 2023. On 22 April 2023, Jennings would suffer a hamstring injury while batting in a County Championship match against Somerset at Taunton and was forced to retire hurt on 189*. In May 2023, Lancashire announced that Jennings would be out of action for a sizeable portion of the season due to the injury.

Jennings signed a new five-year contract with Lancashire in December 2024. He stood down as captain of the County Championship team on 13 May 2025 after the side failed to win any of their first five matches.

== International career ==
In November 2016, Jennings was named in England's Test squad for the final two matches of their series against India to replace the injured Haseeb Hameed. He was the 101st person to score a century on his Test debut, against India on 8 December 2016, and also became the third English cricketer to score a century on debut against India. His innings of 112 was the highest by any opener on Test debut against India. His second England innings was a contrast to his first as he was dismissed on the first ball he faced. In his second Test, he was out for just one in the first innings as England posted a total of 477. He made 54 in the second innings to get England off to a good start.

Jennings was selected for two England Lions matches against the South African touring team in June 2017. Despite relatively limited returns, he retained his place in the England Test team in the first four Tests of the summer against South Africa. However, after averaging 15.88 in this series, he was dropped for the first test against West Indies in August 2017, with his place being taken by his former opening partner at Durham, Mark Stoneman.

After the Lord's Test against Pakistan in May 2018, Jennings was recalled in place of Stoneman due to his good form for Lancashire in the County Championship. Though he had a struggled against India in the previously concluded home series, Jennings was included as part of the team touring Sri Lanka in October 2018. He scored a century against the home side in the second innings of the first test to set a winning target for his team. Jennings also played a crucial role in the field as part of England's victory in the third and final Test, taking four catches at short leg in Sri Lanka's first innings to restrict them to a total of 240. In so doing, Jennings equalled the England record for number of catches taken in a single Test innings.

On 29 May 2020, Jennings was named in a 55-man group of players to begin training ahead of international fixtures starting in England following the COVID-19 pandemic. On 17 June 2020, Jennings was included in England's 30-man squad to start training behind closed doors for the Test series against the West Indies. On 12 October 2022, Jennings was recalled to the Test team for the 3-match Test series against Pakistan.

== Franchise career ==
In July 2024 Jennings was called up by the London Spirit in The Hundred, making his first appearance for the team in August. This was his first franchise contract.

== Big Bash League ==
He was drafted by the Perth Scorchers for the 2024–25 BBL.
