= Jan Meyer =

Johannes Petrus Meyer (nickname Jan; 26 June 1842, in Prince Albert, Cape Colony – 2 December 1919, in Johannesburg) was a politician, member of the Volksraad of the South African Republic, mining entrepreneur, and farmer; he is the man for whom Meyerton and Meyersdal (a neighborhood of Alberton) are named.

Meyer played a major role in the discovery of the main vein of gold on the Witwatersrand. As a field cornet, he inspected and surveyed land, giving him the opportunity to study the geological structure of the area and to search for subcrops. G.J. du Plessis found the main vein on Turffontein Farm on Meyer's suggestion. He also founded Meyerskamp, later named Natalkamp, and co-owned the Meyer & Charlton Mine, becoming one of the first Afrikaner mining magnates.

He was the first Volksraad member to represent Johannesburg, from 1887 to 1892. His main focus was the successful effort to grant Johannesburg municipality status. Second, he championed the building of the Delagoa Bay-Pretoria railway to supply the Rand's markets for local and imported agricultural and industrial products. He realized that Delagoa Bay, closer than Durban or Cape Town, would be a better trade destination for miners, merchants, industrialists, and farmers around Johannesburg. Third, he played a role in establishing a Second Volksraad to represent Uitlander (foreigner) interests.

== Background and youth ==
Meyer was the son of Johan George (Org) Meyer and Hester Christiana Elizabeth Mulder. Johan Meyer made the Great Trek as a young bachelor, originally a member of Hendrik Potgieter’s party, and went with them to Ohrigstad. Members of this group are held by tradition to have traveled to the site of the present Alberton South Reformed Church and buried a Voortrekker woman and child who died there where the parsonage is now. Org was probably one of the 11 men who traveled northward to find Louis Tregardt and explore the area. On his return in August 1836, he was just in time to defend the Trekkers from the Matabele at the Battle of Vegkop that October. Apparently, he then returned to Prince Albert, where he married Hester Mulder in 1840, who gave birth to Johannes Petrus (Jan) on 26 June 1842, five months before the foundation of the Prince Albert Reformed Church.

In 1844, two-year-old Jan moved with his parents to Transvaal, where his father had purchased three farms: Elandsfontein (where they lived), Klipriviersberg, and Alwynspoort. The family traveled to the Karoo, and upon their return, Org built a house for a Smit who had settled in Klipriviersberg, pleased to have a neighbor in the sparsely populated area. In 1860, Smit died, after which Org sold Klipriviersberg. Jan, eighteen by then, wanted to buy it but competed with merchants who wanted a shop there since it was on the road from Vereeniging to Pretoria. The young man won with a bid of £500, contributing £200 of his own money but borrowing the rest from an Erasmus who went on to farm in Irene. Jan started a store there and began working as a carter.

In 1855, the whole Meyer family traveled to Prince Albert, but Org died on the way back near Colesberg. The 13-year-old Jan therefore became the family breadwinner, helping them cross rivers and protecting the cattle from wild animals at night, while heavy rains robbed them of firewood. His brother had died in 1851 while crossing the Jukskei River during a storm in an ox-wagon to gather wood. The cattle and servants fled and Jan hid under the wagon.

Jan Meyer married Christina Salmina Meyer (no relation), and, in 1860, they built his first house where the Alberton city hall now stands, on land purchased from his stepfather Abraham Viljoen for £13. His cornfield and fruit trees were irrigated by a ditch from the Natalspruit River. Christina died giving birth to their fourth daughter on 31 July 1870. He remained there until the death of that daughter on 29 August 1871. In 1872, he remarried to the widow Stephina Petronella Botha (née Strydom), with whom he moved to Klipriviersberg. They had a son and four daughters.

His only formal education was at home from his widowed mother, but he showed an aptitude for public life early despite his rough upbringing.

== Discovery of gold ==
After the discovery of gold in Barberton, Meyer came to visit and learned to identify gold-bearing ores. In the 1880s, according to tradition, Meyer found such ores on the Rand and informed the government of them.

In 1884, he was assigned to survey the area to see if there were any unclaimed plots of land which could thus be claimed by the government. It took 18 months to complete, during which he found a piece of land he is said to have called Randjeslaagte. The state at the time—given how indebted it was—paid field cornets very little, and the State Secretary of the South African Republic offered him the land as payment in kind when he asked for a raise. However, Volksraad was not in session, and the Secretary of State therefore said a decision would have to await its return.

Meanwhile, once gold was discovered on the Rand, the South African Republic (ZAR) government decided to found a city there. There is no evidence that the State Secretary told Meyer this; Johannesburg is not named after him but after Christiaan Johannes Joubert and Johann Rissik.

== Public life ==
The influx of immigrants to the Rand caused practical problems for landowners, many of whom fielded requests to mine on their farms. In at least one case, on F.J. Bezuidenhout's Doornfontein Farm, one proceeded to dig without permission. Investors from Kimberley invested in farms or even bought them outright. Pretoria first assumed the rush would be short-lived, like those in Pilgrim's Rest, Barberton, and Lydenburg. The main civil servant on the scene was Field Cornet Meyer, tasked with settling and granting mining claims, keeping the peace between owners and diggers, and generally enforcing the ZAR Constitution.

With his growing responsibilities came great financial opportunities. Since the government believed the gold rush would wane, Meyer had to play the role of mining commissioner as well. On 5 July 1885 (according to some sources but more likely in 1886), he borrowed a prospector's license and staked a claim of his own in Doornfontein as a friend of Bezuidenhout, thus co-founding the successful Meyer & Charlton Mine.

Before long, the bonanza was so difficult to regulate that Meyer petitioned the government to declare open prospecting, which Pretoria agreed to in an 4 August 1886, declaration. C.J. Joubert and Rissik were sent to the area to determine which farms would be affected. They worked closely with Meyer in his various capacities.

His store in Klipriviersberg was supplied by bullock cart from Kimberley and Pietermaritzburg, introducing him in the process to many from the Natal Colony. A miners’ camp near his holdings was mainly populated by miners from that area as well, lending their name to that Natalkamp as well as the nearby-flowing Natalspruit.

== Staking claims ==
The geological structure of the Rand required expensive heavy machinery to mine a claim. A lease letter from the government was needed to officially seal the owner-digger relationship and obtain the funds. The owner rented the land from the government, usually for up to £5/acre/yr, receiving in return £1/mo from the miners for prospecting rights in what was very much a seller's market.

On 20 August 1886, the government officially started issuing lease letters to owners and tenants. Areas between 50 and 500 acres could be granted in 50-acre lots. The 1885 Gold Law that allowed this also gave the owner the ability to reserve a tenth of their farm as their own claim before open prospecting was allowed. The government, however, reserved the right to collect 2.12% of the gold proceeds as a tax. Owners could stake another 10 claims as long as they paid the standard £5/mo or less for each claim; they also specified which areas, such as gardens, fields, and the farmhouse, were off limits for mining. Mining licenses were up to £20/mo. By not selling their farm, Boers gained financial windfalls.

== Mining magnate ==
During the gold rush, people often came to Meyer as acting commissioner asking for licenses, but he refused to grant them if he visited and determined that the area did not contain gold. The miners had usually already purchased or optioned the land. Those who had bought one piece of land often opened other claims to ensure they still turned a profit amid the high demand, and fraud was common. Meyer's partner, Charlton, thus fell into £40,000 in debt, which Meyer paid off after borrowing money from the Bank of Natal. In this manner, Meyer became the sole owner of their mine west of today's Johannesburg abattoir and north of the City Deep mine near what is now Kaserne.

By 1889, there were signs that the mining industry was experiencing a slump. In several areas, the main vein was exhausted, requiring shafts to be built to reach deeper. Meyer then sold 100,000 £1 shares of his mine on the Johannesburg Stock Exchange. Since his mine was known to be rich in gold, share prices soon climbed to £10 a share. Afterwards, he sold it all and left the mining business a millionaire, using the proceeds to buy land between Hammanskraal, Warmbaths, Standerton, and the confluence of the Klip and Vaal Rivers. By the time he died in 1919, he owned 56,000 acres (around 48,000 ha). His children inherited 7,000 acres each. After the Second Boer War, he donated a parcel near Standerton to found a town for impoverished Afrikaners.

The foundation of the Johannesburg Reformed Church (NGK) also owes a debt to Meyer. The decision to found a congregation there was reached during a service held by Rev. Van Warmelo at Meyer's house.

== Second Boer War ==
Like most Boers, Meyer was hit hard by the 1890s African rinderpest epizootic, losing many animals to it. During the Boer War, according to his grandson P.L. Meyer, he would smear the manure of known sick animals in the mouths of those who appeared to be sick as makeshift inoculation.

Over 60 years old by the outbreak of war in 1899, Jan Meyer stayed home. His son Org, later a colonel, enlisted toward the end. Having lost his leg in a hunting accident, Jan had to walk with a crutch and therefore could not serve as a Boer Commando. His mansion, visible today along the highway from Germiston to Vereeniging and built in 1891, was not burned by the British Army. During the war, a series of blockhouses, visible today along that same highway, were built around Johannesburg to protect the local gold mines, among other things. Most of the farms where these were built were left untouched as well. Part of the reason for this was the British military government's sympathies for Meyer as a city-founding mining magnate who represented Uitlander interests in Johannesburg and the Transvaal Volksraad alike.

He did not support the Maritz Rebellion of 1914. However, he brought food every morning to its instigator, Gen. Christiaan de Wet, when the latter was imprisoned in Johannesburg.

== Volksraad member ==
The election laws of the ZAR left the Afrikaners with the political power in Johannesburg despite their being in the minority. All citizens over 21 who were members of a Protestant church could vote for the Volksraad. In 1890, under pressure to serve the growing immigrant population, the government lifted the religious proscriptions and established a Second Volksraad in which immigrants could, two years after they completed their two-year naturalization process, vote after paying a £5 fee. Twelve years after naturalization, they could vote for the First Volksraad.

For the first year after the discovery of gold, Johannesburg was represented in the Volksraad by the member for the Heidelberg district. On 23 November 1887, the Executive Council declared the mining areas of Barberton, Komatipoort, and Steynsdorp as one district representing the Rand. With the foundation of the Second Volksraad, Johannesburg was represented by one member in each chamber. At the beginning of 1888, Meyer became the first such representative in the Volksraad, bringing his civil service and mining experience thereby to bear. He advocated primarily for granting Johannesburg municipality status, building a railway from Delagoa Bay to Pretoria, and establishing the Second Volksraad. The latter initiative was in part meant to assuage his and others’ concerns that Uitlanders would dominate the First Volksraad by sheer numbers otherwise. Important priorities of foreign affairs and defense would remain the role of the First, along with the care of the aging more likely to vote there, a key priority for the son of Voortrekkers who treasured their sense of independence. His affinity for Uitlander aspirations came in part from working with so many of them, English-speaking and otherwise, and he would go on to be a founding member in 1894 of the Witwatersrand Agricultural Society (later the hosts of the annual Rand Show), where he served until his death as esteemed Deputy President.

Election campaigns began as soon as the Second Volksraad was founded. H.J. Morkel, the first candidate in the field, was a fluently bilingual veteran of six years in the Kroonstad in the Orange Free State Volksraad, but had to withdraw as a non-citizen of the ZAR. This decision drew criticism from Carl Jeppe and Johannes de Meillon. The inquiry committee, including special magistrate Carl von Brandis and mining commissioner Jan Eloff, found that the vote-counters were not sworn in properly and that Jeppe had supplied voters with liquor, leading the Government to annul the results of the election. Thus, the Rand had only Meyer representing them in the First Volksraad and nobody in the Second. Four candidates stood for the by-election redo on 29 July 1891. C. L. Neethling had represented Heidelberg in 1881 in the Volksraad, but could not obtain the necessary signatures to get his name on the ballot and therefore withdrew, in part due to bad blood between him and Meyer. The Star wrote that "Oom Jan deserves so well of this community, he has done such yeoman's service in our cause", going on to recommend rejecting Neethling in the name of supporting Johannesburg and not opposing Meyer.

Jeppe's withdrawal left J. F. Celliers and De Meillon as the only candidates. Celliers won the turbulent election, though De Meillon complained to the government that his supporters were prevented from voting. The complaint was dismissed by a committee of inquiry, and Celliers became the first Johannesburg member of the Second Volksraad.

By 4 April 1892, Meyer's popularity had declined the point where only nine attended his town hall that day. In August 1892, he suffered another setback when he confused two Volksraad petitions, one from the Health Committee and one from the inhabitants of Doornfontein, causing the former to be rejected. This was seen as a betrayal, "and it is Jan Meyer who is the turncoat, who goes back on his promises, snubs the Board and Johannesburg generally, and stands in the way of its progress and prosperity".

Meyer earned plaudits for the Delagoa Bay Railway, his efforts to best implement the Gold Law, and his fiery opposition to the concession system in foreign affairs. He was, however, unenthusiastic about granting the franchise to Uitlanders, seeing no chance of passing something so contrary to the opinions of the Volksraad. These views made him increasingly unpopular with the Uitlanders and with the English-language press.

Although his biggest critics could not vote, Afrikaners mostly followed the Anglophone press until the late 1890s and therefore favored its choices at the ballot box. When he attracted only five to an 24 October 1892, campaign stop, he saw the writing on the wall and stood down for the January 1893 election, ending his career in the Volksraad.

== Foundation of Alberton ==
Meyer was only partially involved with the foundation of Alberton. He owned part of Elandsfontein, while his mother owned the rest. At the height of the gold fever, an American company offered the widow £75,000 for the 120 acres her husband had left her. Meyer and Bezuidenhout were the executors of her estate, and turned for advice to Bezuidenhout, who countered with an offer of £85,000. To Meyer's dismay, Bezuidenhout reacted to a telegram from De Aar in which the company agreed by raising the price to £90,000. The matter was dropped, and in 1903, Gen. Hennie Alberts bought the land for £22,000 and founded Alberton there.

== Foundation of the Rand Easter Show ==
The discovery of diamonds in Kimberley and gold in Johannesburg created a great demand for food and thus a major opportunity for farmers. Before the mineral rushes, most Free State and Transvaal Boers were subsistence farmers. Each farm kept a pair of horses for transport, a few teams of oxen to pull wagons for hunting, attending communion, and trips to town to buy supplies. There were poultry, wheat and maize fields, a small kitchen garden, and a peach orchard. The mining bonanzas provided an impetus for developing cash crop agriculture and required an organized body to promote, expand, improve, and modernize agricultural production.

Many agricultural societies had failed to build a nationwide profile, while the Transvaal Volksraad had been very hostile to the idea of establishing a department of agriculture. On 18 March 1894, a group of men in Johannesburg gathered to consider founding an organization to promote farming and organize fairs. They agreed to form a recruitment committee and to hold a general members’ meeting in May. Meyer was present at the inaugural meeting of the Witwatersrand Agricultural Society on 15 May, where an Executive Council was elected. This society would annually hold what came to be known as the Rand Easter Show or simply the Rand Show, aided in this effort by Meyer's role as a liaison between the Society and the ZAR Executive Council. As a Volksraad member for Johannesburg and later Heidelberg, his support was crucial to obtain seed money and fair grounds for the first Rand Show, which was opened with pomp and circumstance by State President of the South African Republic Paul Kruger and a guard of honor including 50 armed citizens including Field Cornet Meyer.

At the foundation meeting, Meyer was named Deputy President of the Society, a role he held off and on until his death in 1919. To Meyer, the Society played another key role: a force for improving relations between Boers and English-speakers. At some time before the Second Boer War, he resigned as Deputy President, only rejoining in March 1907. On the eve of the 1908 exhibition, he sternly advocated for continued government involvement and better advocacy for Transvaal cattle breeding.

Meyer opposed the state itself competing for prizes and cups before ordinary farmers had a chance to do so. Therefore, government entries could only get certificates for the highest awards. Care was also taken to price locally bred livestock fairly. In 1910, Meyer was reelected Deputy President.

The provision of refreshments proved another major problem. Meyer donated an already built teahouse for the purpose ahead of the 1915 Show. He resigned in protest in 1918, a year when no Afrikaners were elected to the Executive Council of the Society. Nevertheless, he believed that agriculture was one area where the "two white groups" could find common ground.

== Death ==
Meyer died at the age of 77. Walking on his farm with a gun, he stumbled and accidentally shot himself in the head. He was buried on 4 December 1919, on his Klipriviersberg farm.

== Sources ==
- Raper, Peter Edmund (2004). New Dictionary of South African Place Names. Johannesburg & Cape Town: Jonathan Ball Publishers.
- Potgieter, D.J. (editor-in-chief) (1972). Standard Encyclopaedia of Southern Africa. Cape Town: Nasionale Opvoedkundige Uitgewery.
- Sandler, E.A. in Beyers, C.J. (editor-in-chief) (1981). Suid-Afrikaanse Biografiese Woordeboek, vol. IV. Durban: Butterworth & Kie (Edms) Bpk.
- Stals, prof. dr. E.L.P (ed.) (1978). Afrikaners in die Goudstad, vol. 1: 1886 – 1924. Cape Town/Pretoria: HAUM.
- Van der Waal, Gerhard-Mark (1986). Van mynkamp tot metropolis: Die boukuns van Johannesburg, 1886–1940. Johannesburg: Chris van Rensburg Publikasies (Edms.) Beperk.
