= Zelotes capensis =

Burgersdorp Dark Ground Spider

Conservation status
- Least Concern (SANBI Red List)

Scientific classification
- Kingdom: Animalia
- Phylum: Arthropoda
- Subphylum: Chelicerata
- Class: Arachnida
- Order: Araneae
- Infraorder: Araneomorphae
- Family: Gnaphosidae
- Genus: Zelotes
- Species: Z. capensis

Binomial name
- Zelotes capensis FitzPatrick, 2007

Species of spider

Zelotes capensis is a species of spider in the family Gnaphosidae. It is commonly known as the Burgersdorp dark ground spider.

== Distribution ==
Zelotes capensis is endemic to South Africa. It has been recorded from three provinces, Eastern Cape, Free State, and Western Cape, at altitudes ranging from 912 to 1,417 m above sea level.

The species is known from the type locality of Burgersdorp in the Eastern Cape, as well as locations in the Free State and Western Cape, with each province represented by single collections.

== Habitat and ecology ==
The species inhabits the Grassland and Nama Karoo biomes. These are free-running spiders that are found under stones during the day.

== Conservation ==
Zelotes capensis is listed as Least Concern by the South African National Biodiversity Institute due to its wide geographic range. There are no significant threats to the species, but more sampling is needed to determine the species' range.

== Taxonomy ==
The species was described by Moira Jane FitzPatrick in 2007 from the type locality Burgersdorp in the Eastern Cape. It is known from both sexes.
