= Steytler =

Steytler is a surname found most commonly in South Africa. People with the name include:

- Abraham Isaac Steytler (1840–1922), South African clergyman
- Anne Steytler (1921–2010), American activist and feminist
- Bill Steytler (born 1947), South African cricketer
- Christopher Steytler (born ?), South African-born Australian judge
- Jan Steytler (1910–?), South African politician
