= Ray Jennings =

South African cricketer (born 1954)

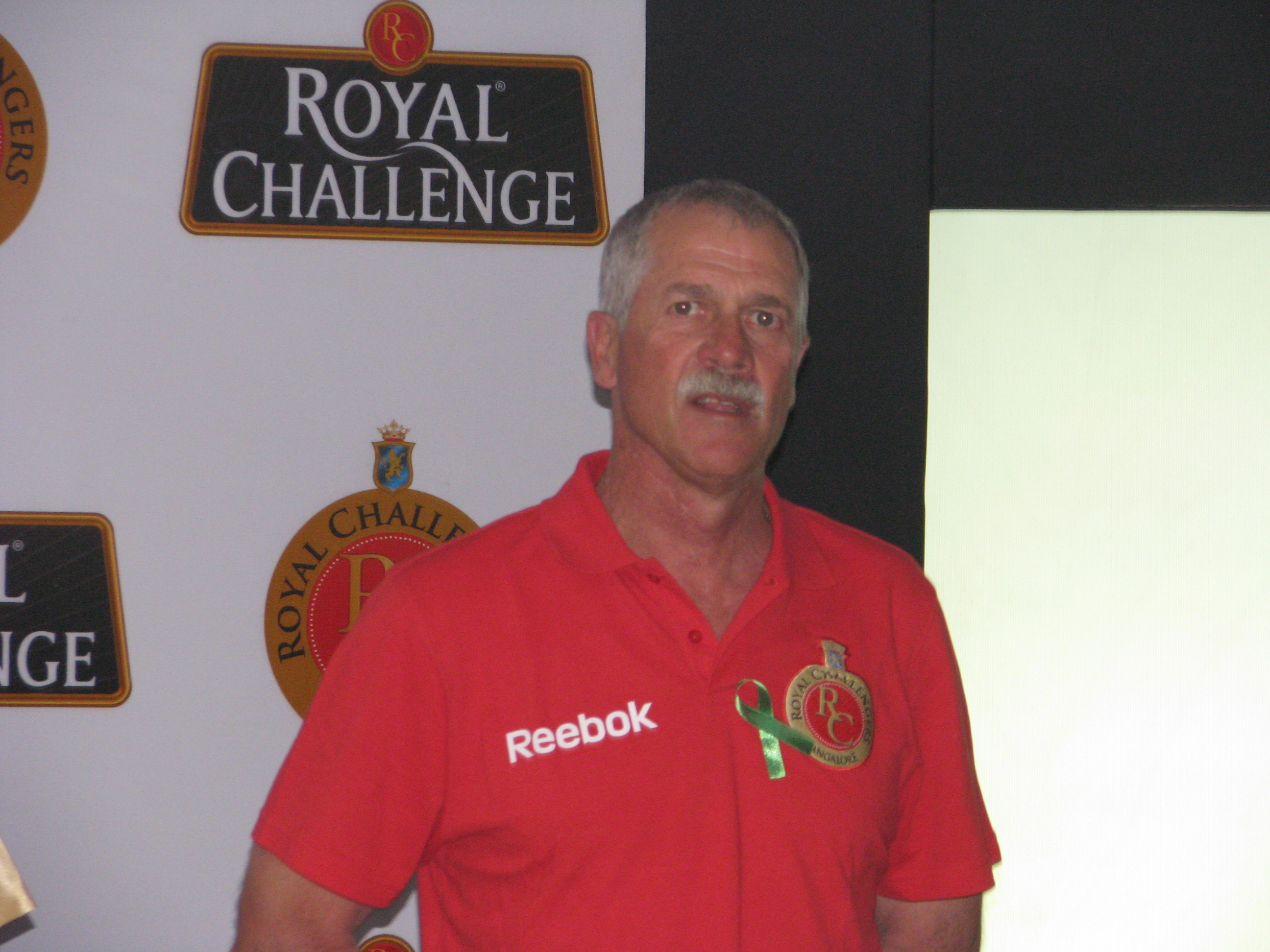

Personal information
- Full name: Raymond Vernon Jennings
- Born: 9 August 1954 (age 72); Vanderbijlpark, Transvaal Province, South Africa
- Batting: Right-handed
- Role: Wicket-keeper
- Relatives: Keaton Jennings (son); Dylan Jennings (son); Kenneth Jennings (brother)

Domestic team information
- Years: Team
- 1975/76–1989/90: Transvaal
- 1990/91–1992/93: Northern Transvaal

Head coaching information
- Years: Team
- 2004–2005: South Africa

Career statistics
Competition	FC	LA
Matches	159	148
Runs scored	4,160	1,152
Batting average	23.59	20.21
100s/50s	3/15	0/2
Top score	168	81
Balls bowled	6	–
Wickets	0	–
Bowling average	–	–
5 wickets in innings	–	–
10 wickets in match	–	–
Best bowling	–	–
Catches/stumpings	567/54	187/19
- Source: CricketArchive, 8 December 2016

Raymond Vernon Jennings (born 9 August 1954) is a former South African cricketer. He was one of South Africa's leading wicket-keepers during the suspension of the South African national team from international cricket during the apartheid era.

In October 2004 Jennings was appointed coach of South Africa on a short-term contract, he had previously coached South Africa A. Under Jennings, South Africa played four Test series, losing to India and England before beating Zimbabwe and the West Indies. At the end of the West Indies tour he was replaced by Mickey Arthur.

He coached the Under-19 team in the 2008 World Cup in Malaysia before taking over as coach of the Royal Challengers Bangalore for the second season of the IPL.

== Coaching Royal Challengers Bangalore ==
Late in 2008 Jennings took over as head coach of Royal Challengers Bangalore, a team in the Indian Premier League owned by the business tycoon Vijay Mallya. He was now heading a unit that experienced a forgettable IPL 2008 after finishing 7th on the log among the 8 competing teams. Jennings brought the team together by making Anil Kumble the captain of the side for the second edition of the IPL that was to start in South Africa. Under Jennings, Royal Challengers Bangalore had success and made it to the finals of the league facing Deccan Chargers in 2009. This was a big turn around for the franchise and the team who had a bad run the previous season. The same year, Royal Challengers Bangalore also qualified for the inaugural Champions League Twenty20. In 2010, the team made it to the semi-finals losing to Mumbai Indians and later finishing 3rd on the table.

== Personal life ==
Jennings has a son named Keaton, who has represented Durham, Lancashire County Cricket Club, and the England Test side, scoring 112 on debut against India in Mumbai on 8 December 2016.
