= Jan Eloff =

South African commissioner

- Born: 19 July 1859; Rustenburg Local Municipality, South African Republic
- Died: 10 July 1939 (aged 79); Union of South Africa
- Occupation(s): Commissioner, mining commissioner

Jan Eloff (19 July 1859 – 10 July 1939) was the first civilian commissioner and the second mining commissioner in Johannesburg, South Africa, and the man for whom Eloff Street was named after, the first street to be surveyed. In time, twelve streets in the Greater Johannesburg area were named after him.

== Early life ==
Born in Rustenburg District, South African Republic, Eloff was the seventh of the ten children of Sarel Johannes Eloff, commander of Rustenburg from 1864 to 1889, and his wife, Susanna Cornelia Jacobsz, and a younger brother of FC (Ryk Freek) Eloff, son-in-law of President Kruger through his marriage to Paul and Gezina Kruger's daughter Elsie. Eloff was first educated at home by a private teacher and later visited the school of the Hermannsburg Missionary Society on the Morgenzon farm near Rustenburg. At Graaff-Reinet he bought wagons and returned to the Transvaal, where he disposed of them at a reasonable profit. As a young man, he served under his father in the First War of Independence (1880–81).

== Career ==
He became clerk in the office of the State Attorney in Pretoria. He accompanied the third deputation (according to Professor PJ Nienaber the Second Freedom Deputation) to Europe (1883–84) as private secretary of President Kruger and got the opportunity to visit Britain and many other Western European states. The other members of this mission were Reverend Stephanus Jacobus du Toit (Totius's father) and General Nicolaas Smit. In 1884 he was named the first civilian commissioner of the republic in Pretoria and in this capacity gained direct knowledge of the events of the gold discovery and of the deployment of the Witwatersrand gold field. In September 1886 he became public prosecutor and clerk of Captain Carl von Brandis in Johannesburg and succeeded Von Brandis on 4 November 1886 as mining commissioner of the gold field.

In 1886 Eloff was already chairman of the seven-member Delvers Committee, and when the Delvers Committee was replaced by a Health Council in 1887, he was one of seven members. The Health Council remained in charge of local affairs until the establishment of the first city council in 1897. On 2 November 1889 he laid the cornerstone of the second building housing the Johannesburg Stock Exchange. Eloff remained mining commissioner until the end of December 1892 and became intimately involved with the origin and growth of Johannesburg and the early development of the Witwatersrand gold field. With the survey of Johannesburg by surveyor Jos de Villiers, the first street was named after Eloff.

== Later years and family life ==
After leaving Johannesburg, Eloff started farming near Standerton. In 1897, he traveled to Switzerland and Germany with his family, but he returned to the republic little more than a year later at the outbreak of the Second Boer War in 1899, when he became a member of the Rustenburg Boer Commandos. After the end of the war, on 31 May 1902, he returned to his birthplace, Waterkloof farm Rustenburg, to farm on his land and had a castle built there. In 1912, he left with his family for Switzerland, where he was trapped during World War I. In 1919, he returned to Pretoria for good, where he spent the rest of his life.

Eloff married Catharina Cornelia de Ridder, daughter of Reverend Johannes de Ridder of the Rustenburg Reformed Church (GKSA), whose grandson Johan de Ridder went on to become the architect of GKSA churches. The couple had three sons and two daughters.
