= Rustenburg Reformed Church (GKSA) =

Oldest congregation of the Reformed Churches in South Africa

The Rustenburg Reformed Church is the oldest congregation of the Reformed Churches in South Africa (GKSA), founded in February 1859 by the denomination’s pioneer, Rev. Dirk Postma.

== Background to foundation ==
The congregation was founded in a climate of grave dissatisfaction by Rustenburg voortrekkers with the state of the church in the South African Republic (ZAR). The Dutch Reformed Church in South Africa (NHK) was the only congregation in the town that was founded in 1850 and named for its inhabitants’ relative safety from Bantu raids (it literally means “city of rest” in Afrikaans). The NHK Pastor was Rev. Dirk van der Hoff.

The schismatics had tried several times to find a suitable preacher from the ranks of the Christian Reformed Churches in the Netherlands, ultimately succeeded with Rev. Postma’s dispatch. Arriving on July 9, 1858, in Simon’s Town and staying in Cape Town for a while, he arrived in Rustenburg at the end of the year. He was prepared to take the NHK mantle upon arrival, but on January 10, 1859, his 41st birthday, a general assembly of the NHK resolved themselves “to adopt the Evangelical Hymnal in addition to the Psalms. An ecclesiastical organization, but also nothing more, we call for all to adopt our stance.”

The Rev. Postma and many of his cohorts disagreed with the decision. Therefore, 15 male members of the congregation resolved on January 11, 1859, to separate from the NHK as the Reformed Church worshipping “according to the doctrine, discipline, and service of forefathers such as those who revealed themselves at the Synod of Dort in 1618-1619.”

== Foundation ==
On February 10, 1859, a general meeting was held by those dissatisfied with the NHK. Since Rev. Van der Hoff began refusing use of the Rustenburg NHK church, they had no place of worship and had to gather under a large chinaberry tree cut down in around 1970 after storm damage. The stump where the 300 charter members of the new congregation met has been declared a national heritage site. At the 11th service, Rev. Postma openly declared “the ministry of the Shepherd and Teacher incorporated in the Name and Power of the Lord.” Elders and deacons were elected and ordained thus, and the foundation of Rustenburg soon gave rise to other congregations in Pretoria and Potchefstroom.

== More congregations established ==
Shortly afterward, Rev. Postma received petitions from around the Orange Free State and Cape Colony to join the GKSA. His visits in return helped spur the foundations of the Reddersburg Reformed Church (GKSA), the Burgersdorp Reformed Church (GKSA), the Colesberg Reformed Church (GKSA), and the Middelburg Reformed Church (Cape, GKSA), among others.

== Rev. Postma’s tenure ==
The Rev. Postma served the congregation until 1866, though he served as spiritual leader of the entire denomination throughout Transvaal, the Orange Free State, and Cape Colony. Despite the schism, Rev. Postma and Rev. Van der Hoff retained a “courteous and fraternal” relationship. The animosity between the two churches therefore declined, though were in tension with the Dutch Reformed Church (NGK).

In Transvaal, Rev. Postma guided the NHK through the end of state supervision, a move he initially opposed. As the “state church,” the GKSA had to offset government tax funding, marriages could only be proclaimed therein and the license fees paid thereto, and only members had the right to vote.

Even before the foundation of the Burgersdorp Theological School, Rev. Postma informally taught several pastors, including Jan Lion Cachet and future State Secretary of the South African Republic Nicolaas Swart. In 1866, Rev. Postma left for a post in the Burgersdorp congregation in the northeast of what is now Eastern Cape Province. He founded that congregation on January 21, 1860, in a store’s warehouse, given the lack of suitable meeting halls in a community hostile to Doppers (GKSA members); another source holds that it was founded on Roosterkoek farm near Albert, the nucleus of today’s town of Burgersdorp. This was the first GKSA congregation in Cape Colony.

The Rev. Postma went there with the explicit aim of training ministers. The calmer political environment and wealthy surrounding congregations for funding assistance were among the factors influencing his choice.

== Rev. Jan Lion Cachet ==
The Rev. Cachet was hired as catechism teacher in Ladysmith in Natal Colony on October 3, 1863 for £25 a year and was considering a missionary career. This was against the backdrop of his 1862-1863 power struggle at the Cape Synods against liberal pastors J.J. Kotzé and Thomas François Burgers, and his Transvaal-based brother’s conflict with Rev. Van der Hoff within the NHK. Ultimately, Rev. Cachet arrived in 1865 to join Rev. Postma and teach Hebrew and preparatory subjects to theological students.

He moved with Rev. Postma to Burgersdorp in 1866. On May 13, 1868, one and a half years before the founding of the Theological School there, he wrote the proponent exam.

The Rev. Cachet served Rustenburg from 1868 until 1869, when he was appointed co-pastor of Burgersdorp and preparatory lecturer at the school. He became acting Professor of Theology at the school in 1892 and official Professor as of the 1894 Synod, overseeing pastor training and serving as preparatory school rector.

== Revs. Du Plessis, De Ridder, and Postma, Jr. ==
A three-year vacancy in the congregation came to an end when Rev. Louw du Plessis was ordained in 1872. The congregation lost population on April 15, 1875, when a large group of Doppers left for Portuguese Angola across the Kalahari Desert in what was known as the Dorsland Trek. In 1880, he left to serve the Colesberg congregation, founded by his father Izak David du Plessis and his mother Hester Venter on their Hamelfontein farm on December 8, 1860.

His successor, Rev. Johannes de Ridder (1833-1896), who served as Rustenburg’s fourth pastor from 1880 to 1896, had arrived from the Netherlands in 1857-1858 as a young teacher. After taking the frock under the tutelage of Rev. Postma, he served in Rustenburg and Standerton, though he died in October 1896 shortly after his ordainment by the latter.

Rustenburg’s fifth pastor was Rev. Dirk Postma, Jr., son of the founder. After serving since 1884 as pastor of the Fauresmith Reformed Church (GKSA), he was called as the first pastor of the Dorsland Trekkers, mostly Doppers, upon their arrival at Sâo Januário, Humpata, Angola. Ordained on October 21, 1888 as such in Burgersdorp, he arrived in Angola in 1889. Besides serving as a pastor there, he founded a school where he taught underprivileged youth. He also began ministering like other Transvaal pioneers to the “tame folk,” native servants of the Boers. Ill health forced him to return, handing over the congregation to his brother Marthinus Postma in Moçâmedes.

At the beginning of 1891, he accepted a post as joint pastor of Fauresmith and Petrusburg, then succeeded Rev. Cachet in October 1894 as pastor of the Steynsburg Reformed Church (GKSA) in the Northeastern Cape. On May 6, 1897, he returned to his birthplace in Rustenburg. Financial issues tied to his wife’s spending lost him his pastorate on June 30, 1905. Trying in vain to win back the frock, he made a living as a traveling peddler of books and other goods in the local countryside.

== Pastors ==
- Postma, Dirk, 1859 - 1866
- Lion-Cachet, Jan, 1868 - 1869
- Du Plessis, Lodewicus Johannes, 1872 - 1880
- De Ridder, Johannes, 1880 - 1896
- Postma, Dirk (D-Sn), 1897 - 1905
- Vorster, Louis Petrus, 1905 - 1920
- Kotzé, David Nicolaas Gerhardus, 1921 - 1946
- Van der Walt, Dirk Jacobus, 1947 - 1951
- De Wet, Johannes Marthinus, 1952 - 1957
- Venter, Petrus Johannes, 1957 - 1979
- Smit, Cornelis Johannes, 1979 - 1986
- Van Wyk, Gert Jacobus, 1987 - 2016
- De Beer, Pieter Gert Wessel, 1989 - 2004
- Venter, Jacobus Johannes, 1997 - present
- Smit, Johannes, 2007 - 2010
- Robinson, Cobus-Brahm, 2011 - 2014
- Van Wyk, Griffel, 2017 – present

== Sources ==
- De Kock, W.J. (chief ed.) (1968). Suid-Afrikaanse Biografiese Woordeboek, vol. I. Cape Town: Nasionale Boekhandel Beperk.
- Du Toit, Prof. Dr. S. du Toit (1955). Handleiding vir die studie van die kerkgeskiedenis. Potchefstroom: Pro Rege-Pers Beperk.
- Gerdener, Dr. G.B.A. (1934). Ons kerk in die Transgariep: Geskiedenis van die Ned. Geref. Kerk in Natal, Vrystaat en Transvaal. Cape Town: Nasionale Pers.
- Maeder, Rev. G.A. and Zinn, Christian (1917). Ons Kerk Album. Cape Town: Ons Kerk Album Maatschappij Bpkt.
- Nienaber, P.J. (1949). Hier Is Ons Skrywers! Biografiese Sketse van Afrikaanse Skrywers. Johannesburg: Afrikaanse Pers-Boekhandel.
- Nienaber, P.J. (1963). Suid-Afrikaanse pleknaamwoordeboek, vol. 1. Kaapstad, Johannesburg: Suid-Afrikaanse Boeksentrum.
- Potgieter, D.J. (chief ed.) (1973). Standard Encyclopaedia of Southern Africa. Cape Town: Nasionale Opvoedkundige Uitgewery Ltd.
- Spoelstra, Dr. B. (1973). Beknopte Kerkgeskiedenis vir Katkisasie. Potchefstroom: Pro Rege.
- Van der Vyver, Dr. G.C.P. (1969). My erfenis is vir my mooi. Potchefstroom: Kalvyn Jubileum Boekefonds.
- Van der Vyver, Dr. G.C.P. )1958). Professor Dirk Postma 1818–1890. Potchefstroom: Pro Rege-Pers Beperk.
- Vogel, Rev. Willem (2011). Die Almanak van die Gereformeerde Kerke in Suid-Afrika vir die jaar 2012. Potchefstroom: Administratiewe Buro.
