= Chris Morris (cricketer) =

South African cricketer

Personal information
- Full name: Christopher Henry Morris
- Born: 30 April 1987 (age 39); Pretoria, Gauteng Province, South Africa
- Batting: Right-handed
- Bowling: Right arm fast-medium
- Role: Bowling allrounder
- Relatives: Willie Morris (father)

International information
- National side: South Africa (2012–2019)
- Test debut (cap 324): 2 January 2016 v England
- Last Test: 27 July 2017 v England
- ODI debut (cap 110): 10 June 2013 v Pakistan
- Last ODI: 6 July 2019 v Australia
- ODI shirt no.: 2
- T20I debut (cap 55): 21 December 2012 v New Zealand
- Last T20I: 24 March 2019 v Sri Lanka
- T20I shirt no.: 2

Domestic team information
- Years: Team
- 2009–2012: North West
- 2010–2015: Highveld Lions
- 2013: Chennai Super Kings
- 2015, 2021: Rajasthan Royals
- 2015–2021: Titans
- 2016–2019: Delhi Capitals (squad no. 2)
- 2016: Surrey
- 2018/19–2019/20: Nelson Mandela Bay Giants
- 2019: Hampshire (squad no. 2)
- 2019/20: Sydney Thunder (squad no. 24)
- 2020: Royal Challengers Bangalore

Career statistics
Competition	Test	ODI	T20I	FC
Matches	4	42	23	60
Runs scored	173	467	133	2571
Batting average	24.71	20.30	14.77	32.96
100s/50s	0/1	0/1	0/1	4/11
Top score	69	62	55*	154
Balls bowled	623	1894	498	9058
Wickets	12	48	34	196
Bowling average	38.25	36.58	20.50	24.48
5 wickets in innings	0	0	0	4
10 wickets in match	0	0	0	1
Best bowling	3/38	4/31	4/27	8/44
Catches/stumpings	5/–	9/–	6/–	53/–
- Source: ESPNcricinfo, 11 January 2022

Christopher Henry Morris (born 30 April 1987) is a former South African professional cricketer who played first-class and List A cricket for Titans and played for South Africa national cricket team. On 11 January 2022, Chris Morris announced retirement from all forms of cricket.

== Domestic career ==
In September 2018, Morris was named in the Titans' squad for the 2018 Abu Dhabi T20 Trophy. The following month, he was named in Nelson Mandela Bay Giants' squad for the first edition of the Mzansi Super League T20 tournament. He was the leading wicket-taker for the team in the tournament, with nine dismissals in seven matches.

In September 2019, Morris was named in the squad for the Nelson Mandela Bay Giants team for the 2019 Mzansi Super League tournament. In April 2021, he was named in Northerns' squad, ahead of the 2021–22 cricket season in South Africa.

=== Indian Premier League ===
After several years of success in the Indian Premier League, he was sold for over US$1 million at the 2016 auction. Morris achieved his highest T20 score during that season's competition, scoring 82 not out from only 32 balls, an innings which included four fours and eight sixes. He was released by the Delhi Capitals ahead of the 2020 IPL auction and was bought by Royal Challengers Bangalore. In 2021, he was bought by Rajasthan Royals for Rs. 16.25 crores (~US$2.3 million), becoming the most expensive player in IPL history.

== International career ==
Morris made his Twenty20 International debut for South Africa in December 2012 against New Zealand. He took two wickets during the match but suffered an injury and was unable to complete his final over. He made his One Day International debut in June 2013 against Pakistan in the 2013 ICC Champions Trophy and his Test debut against England on 2 January 2016.

Morris was selected as part of South Africa's Test, ODI and T20I squads for their tour of England in 2017 and for the 2017 ICC Champions Trophy. In May 2019, he was added to South Africa's squad for the 2019 Cricket World Cup, replacing Anrich Nortje who was ruled out with a hand injury. He finished the tournament as the leading wicket-taker for South Africa, with 13 dismissals in eight matches.
