= Clifford Abrams =

South African cricketer (1935–2002)

Personal information
- Full name: Clifford Dold Abrams
- Born: 26 April 1935; Johannesburg, South Africa
- Died: 13 April 2002 (aged 66); Pretoria, South Africa
- Batting: Right-handed
- Bowling: Right-arm off-break

Domestic team information
- Years: Team
- 1955/56–1956/57: North Eastern Transvaal
- FC debut: 31 December 1955 NE Transvaal v Orange Free State
- Last FC: 20 December 1956 NE Transvall v England

Career statistics
Competition	First class
Matches	5
Runs scored	129
Batting average	18.42
100s/50s	0/1
Top score	54
Balls bowled	568
Wickets	10
Bowling average	31
5 wickets in innings	0
10 wickets in match	0
Best bowling	3/9
Catches/stumpings	3/–
- Source: CricketArchive, 2 March 2017

Clifford Dold Abrams (26 April 1935 – 13 April 2002) was a South African cricketer, who played for North Eastern Transvaal in first-class cricket during the 1950s,
