= Aubrey Dennis =

South African cricketer

Personal information
- Born: 27 May 1929; Benoni, Transvaal, South Africa
- Died: 18 May 2010 (aged 80); Johannesburg, Gauteng, South Africa
- Batting: Left-handed

Domestic team information
- Years: Team
- 1949–50 to 1954–55: North-Eastern Transvaal

Career statistics
Competition	First-class
Matches	17
Runs scored	780
Batting average	26.89
100s/50s	2/3
Top score	138
Balls bowled	32
Wickets	0
Bowling average	–
5 wickets in innings	–
10 wickets in match	0
Best bowling	–
Catches/stumpings	4/–
- Source: Cricinfo, 8 June 2018

Aubrey Dennis (27 May 1929 – 18 May 2010) was a South African cricketer who played first-class cricket for North-Eastern Transvaal from 1950 to 1955.

A solid left-handed batsman who usually batted at number three, Dennis hit the first of his two first-class centuries in North-Eastern Transvaal's match against the touring New Zealanders in 1953–54. North-Eastern Transvaal trailed by 166 runs, but Dennis, concentrating determinedly and limiting his strokeplay, scored 100 not out in 310 minutes, enabling his captain to declare and set the New Zealanders a final-innings target. In his final match, against Griqualand West in the last match of the 1954–55 season, he scored 138, the only century of the match, which North-Eastern Transvaal won.

In 1957–58 he played for Northern Rhodesia in a two-day match against the touring Australians.
