= Gordon Middlewick =

South African cricketer (1932–2021)

Personal information
- Full name: Gordon Vernon Middlewick
- Born: 14 August 1932; Benoni, Transvaal, South Africa
- Died: 19 July 2021 (aged 88)
- Batting: Right-handed
- Bowling: Right-arm fast-medium

Domestic team information
- Years: Team
- 1953-54 to 1960-61: North-Eastern Transvaal

Career statistics
Competition	First-class
Matches	21
Runs scored	116
Batting average	8.28
100s/50s	0/0
Top score	16*
Balls bowled	3139
Wickets	67
Bowling average	19.04
5 wickets in innings	3
10 wickets in match	1
Best bowling	6/22
Catches/stumpings	10/–
- Source: Cricinfo, 17 February 2019

Gordon Vernon Middlewick (14 August 1932 – 19 July 2021) was a South African cricketer who played first-class cricket for North-Eastern Transvaal from 1953 to 1961.

A fast-medium bowler, Gordon Middlewick made his first-class debut against the touring New Zealanders in 1953-54, opening the bowling and taking 6 for 83 and 4 for 74. In the first innings he twice took wickets with consecutive balls; in the second, when the New Zealanders were chasing runs quickly, he took wickets that at one stage looked likely to give North-Eastern Transvaal victory, though in the end New Zealand won by three wickets with four minutes to spare.

Middlewick's best figures were 6 for 22 when North-Eastern Transvaal dismissed Border for 58 in 1954–55. His most successful season was 1958–59, when he took 21 wickets at an average of 13.04 and formed a strong opening attack with Jackie Botten, who set a Currie Cup record with 55 wickets. However, such was North-Eastern Transvaal's weakness in other areas that they lost five of their six matches and finished last in the "B" section of the Currie Cup.

Middlewick was also a soccer player, good enough to travel to England in 1951 to try out for Manchester City. He became a referee.

Middlewick and his wife Monica moved from Transvaal to Margate in Natal in 1988.
