= Willie Morris (cricketer) =

South African cricketer (born 1955)

Personal information
- Full name: William Francis Morris
- Born: 30 March 1955 (age 71); Pretoria, Transvaal Province, Union of South Africa
- Batting: Left-handed
- Bowling: Slow left-arm orthodox
- Relatives: Chris Morris (son)

Domestic team information
- Years: Team
- 1973/74–1991/92: Northern Transvaal

Career statistics
Competition	FC	LA
Matches	74	70
Runs scored	1,653	370
Batting average	16.86	12.33
100s/50s	0/4	0/1
Top score	99	63
Balls bowled	11,848	3,575
Wickets	208	70
Bowling average	26.83	28.15
5 wickets in innings	9	0
10 wickets in match	2	0
Best bowling	7/110	3/17
Catches/stumpings	73/0	40/0
- Source: Cricinfo, 21 December 2017

William Francis Morris (born 30 March 1955) is a South African former first-class cricketer.

Morris was a slow left-arm orthodox bowler and lower-order batsman. He represented Northern Transvaal Schools in the 1972/3 Nuffield Week and made his senior debut for Northern Transvaal in October 1973 in the Gillette Cup. He played for Northern Transvaal from 1973 until 1991.

He is the father of South African international cricketer Chris Morris.
