= Sean Nowak =

South African cricketer (born 1987)

Personal information
- Full name: Sean Andrew Nowak
- Born: 6 January 1987 (age 39); Pretoria, Transvaal, South Africa
- Batting: Right-handed
- Bowling: Right-arm fast
- Role: Bowler

Domestic team information
- Years: Team
- 2008–2015: Northerns
- 2009: Titans
- First-class debut: 2 October 2008 Northerns v Free State
- Last First-class: 24 February 2014 Northerns v Free State
- List A debut: 19 October 2008 Northerns v Borders
- Last List A: 18 January 2015 Northerns v Griqualand West

Career statistics
Competition	FC	LA	T20
Matches	25	24	3
Runs scored	185	23	20
Batting average	11.56	7.66	-
100s/50s	0/0	0/0	0/0
Top score	20	12*	14*
Balls bowled	3691	895	60
Wickets	75	29	1
Bowling average	29.26	26.65	81.00
5 wickets in innings	1	0	0
10 wickets in match	0	0	0
Best bowling	5/32	4/35	1/33
Catches/stumpings	5/0	2/0	0/0
- Source: ESPNcricinfo, 13 November 2017

Sean Andrew Nowak (born 6 January 1987) is a South African cricketer. He is a right-handed batsman and a right-arm fast bowler who played for Northerns between 2008 and 2015. He was born in Pretoria.

Nowak made his first-class debut for Northerns against Free State in October 2008. Other teams he has played for include the Titans, Gloucestershire 2nd XI, Hampshire 2nd XI and Sussex 2nd XI (UK), along with representing the South African Universities cricket team. His local club was University of Pretoria (Tuks).

Nowak was the Physiotherapist for the Oman National Cricket Team and is currently working with the Namibian National Cricket Team.
