= Burgersdorp Reformed Church (GKSA) =

Church in Burgersdorp, South Africa

Coordinates: 30°59′37″S 26°19′48″E

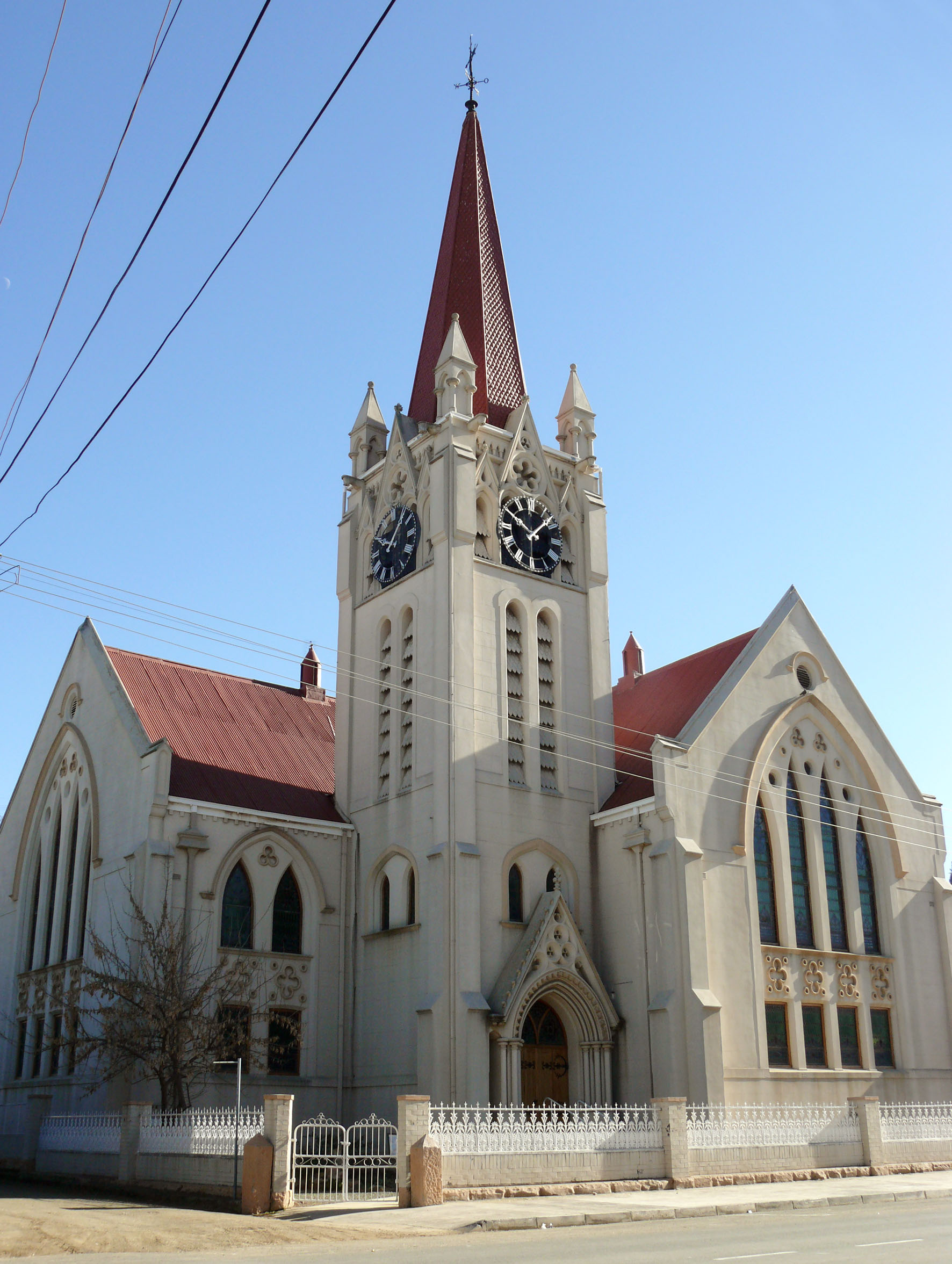

The Burgersdorp Reformed Church is the oldest congregation of the Reformed Churches in South Africa, formerly the Cape Province. It was founded on 21 January 1860, about 11 months after the Church's foundation in Rustenburg on 11 February 1859.

Burgersdorp was for decades the largest Reformed church in the Cape Colony and because the town housed the Church's Theological School from 1869 to the end of 1904, also the most important. In 1872, when there were only 10 congregations in the Boer Republic and seven in the Colony, Burgersdorp had a membership of 989, compared to Reddersburg in the Orange Free State's 714. For that year no Transvaal church has statistics to the Almanac not sent in. Of the nine congregations that did provide statistics, Middelburg, Cape was the third largest with 537 members and Colesberg fourth with 225 members. In the course of 1872, the other congregation in the Colony which was destined to play a major role thanks to its involvement in Reformed and Christian national education, Steynsburg, was separated from Burgersdorp.

Twenty years later, in the Almanac of 1892, Burgersdorp had 1,769 people and 777 members (first in the Colony) and Steynsburg 840 and 417 (third after Middelburg). The largest Transvaal church in that year was Rustenburg with 2,245 souls and 988 members and the largest in the Free State Reddersburg with 1,284 and 575 respectively. The move of the Theological School to Potchefstroom at the beginning of 1905 had only a minor effect on the Burgersdorp congregation, because in the Almanac of 1907 this church's number of souls is still given as 1,221 and its membership as 671, compared to Potchefstroom's 1,175 and 570 respectively. In the course of the 20th century, the urbanization of members reduced Burgersdorp's soul count to 729 in 1931 and its membership to 460, and in 1960 to 686 and 481 respectively. In 1998 it was 290 and 210 and in 2002 229 and 170. In the meantime, a university, the PU for CHO, developed from the Theological School in Potchefstroom and over time this town became one of the largest Reformed centres. The congregations on the town's population increased from 1,811 in 1960 to 3,322 in 1998, decreased to 3,049 in 2002 and further to 2,945 in 2015.

== Ministers ==
- Dirk Postma, 1866–1879
- Jan Lion Cachet, 1869–1875
- Petrus Postma, 1880–1882
- Maarten Petrus Albertus Coetsee jr., 1883–1892
- Louis Petrus Vorster, 1893–1905
- Dirk Postma, 1906 – 29 December 1940 (died in office)
- Dr. Stephanus Johannes van der Walt, 1941–1946
- Abraham Liebrecht Aucamp, 1948–1961
- Jacobus Andries Jooste, 1962–1967
- Philippus Cornelius Kruger, 1967–1975
- Jan Jacobus van der Walt, 1975–1976
- Dr. Jan Louis Venter, 1976–1980
- Andries Hendrik Klopper, 1981–1986
- Theunis Johannes Potgieter, 1987–1998
- Dirk Pansegrouw, 1998–2001
- Jan Louis van der Schyff, 2001–2006
- Jasper Dreyer Potgieter, 2006–2008
- Jan Malan, 2009 – 2020
- Van Schaik, Hanno, 23 August 2020 – present

== Sources ==
- (in Afrikaans) Jooste, prof. dr. J.P. 1960. "Oorsig van die geskiedenis van die Gereformeerde Kerk Burgersdorp". In: Die Gereformeerde Kerk, Burgersdorp. Gedenkalbum by geleentheid van die Eeufees 22–24 Januarie 1960. Burgersdorp: Kerkraad van die Gereformeerde kerk.
- (in Dutch) Maeder, ds. G.A. en Zinn, Christian. 1917. Ons Kerk Album. Kaapstad: Ons Kerk Album Maatschappij Bpkt.
- (in Afrikaans) Spoelstra, dr. B. 1973. Beknopte kerkgeskiedenis vir katkisasie. Potchefstroom: Pro Rege.
- (in Afrikaans) Venter, ds. A.A. 1958. Almanak van die Gereformeerde Kerk in Suid-Afrika vir die jaar 1959. Potchefstroom: Administratiewe Buro.
- (in Afrikaans) Van der Vyver, dr. G.C.P. (voorsitter: gedenkboekredaksie). 1959. Die Gereformeerde Kerk in Suid-Afrika 1859–1959. Potchefstroom: Deputaatskap vir die Eeufees.
- (in Afrikaans) Visagie, J.D. 1988. Nederduits Gereformeerde Kerk Wolmaransstad 1888–1988. Wolmaransstad: NG Kerkraad.
