= Dutch Reformed Church, Burgersdorp =

Church in Burgersdorp, South Africa

Coordinates: 30°59′44″S 26°19′50″E

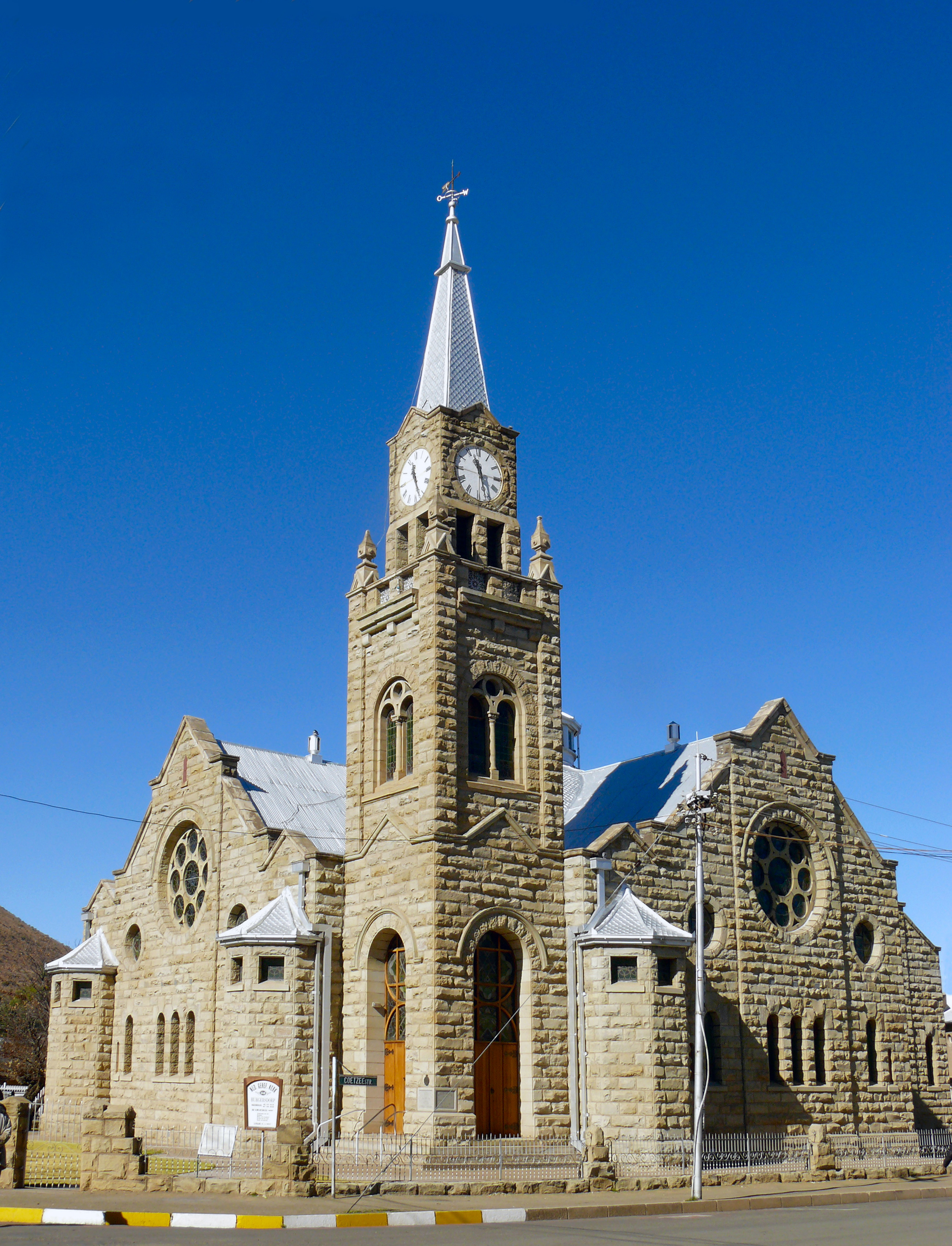

The Dutch Reformed Church in Burgersdorp is a congregation of the Dutch Reformed Church in the Synod of Eastern Cape in South Africa. It is the eighth oldest congregation in this Synod and was founded in 1846, 54 years after Graaff-Reinet. In the entire NG Church it was the 34th foundation, all of which except Pietermaritzburg (1839) and Potchefstroom (1842) were located in the single Cape Colony. In 2016, the congregation had 510 professing and 135 baptized members. Of the professing members, only 200 were under 50, while 140 of the 510 lived locally. On August 17, 2020, the church was damaged by a fire.

== Background ==
By the end of 1844 about 300 families between the Stormbergspruit and the Kraai River were granted permission by the Presbytery of Graaff-Reinet to establish their own congregation here. On December 27, 1847 they bought the farm Klipfontein, which at the time belonged to Gert Buytendach, to build a church and found a town. The farm of 3,607 acres was purchased for 15,000 riksdaalders. It was on this farm that the congregation was founded on October 13, 1846. On January 20, 1847, an auction of plots was held and 75 plots were sold at an average price of £50. A selection plot was already given to Gert Buytendach in 1846 when the farm was purchased. The parish's original boundaries included the later parishes of Aliwal North and Venterstad as well as parts of Dordrecht and Barkly East.

== Ministers ==
- John Murray, 1849–1858, after which a first professor at the seminary
- William Cormack, 1862–1896 (emeritus, died on September 6, 1924)
- Hendrik Wilhelm Geyer, 1898–1930 (emeritus)
- Christian Jacobus Liebenberg, 1921–1926
- Antonie Christoffel Stegmann, 1931–1941
- Hendrik Vrede van Huyssteen, 1941–1942
- Pieter Nicolaas Viljoen de Lange, 1941–1944, 1951 – June 5, 1958 (deceased with his wife in a car accident at Vanwyksrus)
- Wessel Charles Oswald du Toit, 1945–1951
- Andries Groenewald, 1956–1959
- Jacobus Francois Myburgh, 1959–1961
- Andries Daniël Schutte, 1961–1975
- Andries Pretorius Kilian, 18 February 1972–1976
- Dr. Barend Jacobus (Ben) du Toit, 1978–1981
- Louw, Paul Louis, 1980–1989
- Johannes Arnoldus Jansen van Vuuren, 1982–1987
- Kobus Kloppers, September 3, 2016 – present
