= Bill Steytler =

Brazilian-born South African cricketer (born 1947)

Personal information
- Full name: William Brent Steytler
- Born: 29 April 1947 (age 79); São Paulo, Brazil
- Batting: Left-handed
- Bowling: Left-arm orthodox

Domestic team information
- Years: Team
- 1968–1978: Northern Transvaal (Note: Northern Transvaal was known as North Eastern Transvaal until the 1971–72 season.)
- Source: CricketArchive, 5 August 2016

William Brent Steytler (born 29 April 1947) is a former South African cricketer who played for Northern Transvaal in South African domestic cricket. He was a left-arm orthodox bowler. His father is South African and his mother is Brazilian.

Steytler was born in São Paulo, Brazil, but was raised in Pretoria, South Africa, attending Pretoria Boys High School. He made his first-class debut for North Eastern Transvaal in December 1968, in a Currie Cup game against Western Province. He played another three Currie Cup matches the following season, but none at all over the two subsequent seasons. Returning to the Northern Transvaal line-up for the 1972–73 season, Steytler took a maiden first-class five-wicket haul, 5/79 against Griqualand West. He also made his first limited-overs appearances, although with little success. After the 1974–75 season, where Steytler made only two appearances for Northern Transvaal, he did not reappear until the 1977–78 season. Against Transvaal B in what was to be his final first-class appearance, he took a career-best 5/71, including the wicket of future South African international Ray Jennings. Steytler's final match for Northern Transvaal was a limited-overs game against Transvaal in October 1978.
