= Jos de Villiers =

Cape Colony and South African surveyor

Josias Eduard de Villiers (nicknamed Jos, Koelenhof; 27 December 1843 – 16 August 1898) was a Cape Colony and South African Republic surveyor, politician, and amateur astronomer. He surveyed the first neighborhood in Johannesburg, Randjeslaagte. He predicted that Johannesburg would become a city rather than disappearing like other ghost towns (as most South African civil servants of the era did), and De Villiers Street there is named after him.

== Early life ==
From Stellenbosch, De Villiers was the second son of Jacob Isaac de Villiers by his first wife, Ester Elisabeth Johanna Hoffman. De Villiers grew up on Koelenhof farm and later in Stellenbosch, studying at the South African College and becoming a surveyor. In 1863, he was still in Cape Colony working as a surveyor, but shortly afterward left for the Orange Free State. In 1865, he was tasked with surveying the farms in Ladybrand, part of the so-called "Conquered Area" from the Free State-Basotho Wars. He settled in Boshof and represented the area from 1875 to 1882 in the Volksraad (Parliament) of the Free State. After the resolution of the long-running diamond fields dispute of the 1870s stemming from Sir Henry Barkly declaring the entire area British territory, the Free State appointed De Villiers to define its boundary with Griqualand West.

== On the rand ==
By the time gold was discovered in the Witwatersrand, De Villiers had settled in the area. Sir Joseph Robinson, 1st Baronet surveyed mining claims on Langlaagte Farm where gold would first be found, and he also inspected the 600 plots that made up the spoil tip Randjeslaagte, the seed of Johannesburg, with the help of W.H.A. Pritchard between 19 October and 3 November 1886. The streets ran north to south and east to west artificially, with no regard to terrain, and were quite broad, countering the Transvaal government's expectation of a mere mining hamlet similar to Barberton or Pilgrim's Rest. His goal was to offer as many housing plots as possible to save money, while selling the corners as valuable business offices.

The massive influx of prospective miners as well as the first merchants led the city to contract with De Villiers for expansion from 600 to 986 plots. To this end, in April 1887, the two parts of Randjeslaagte were thus connected. At the time, the claims were not proving lucrative, and the Ford and Jeppe syndicate paying for the surveys was under pressure from residents to reduce mining activity. De Villier's street plan continued from southern Marshalltown, but at the end of Bree Street some streets remained unjoined in the "nod," but the plan was never to connect Randjeslaagte together. His plots continued west to Ferreirasdorp, but to the east the owners of plots in Randjeslaagte began auctioning off land on 8 June 1887 that would become the city's first upscale suburb, Doornfontein.

== Last years ==
In 1895, De Villiers sold his property in Johannesburg to move to Cape Town and devote himself full-time to his hobby of astronomy. In August 1896, he joined an expedition to the island of Vadsøya in Norway to view an eclipse, using his surveying skills to set up their equipment. Two years later, he was one of 16 killed in a train crash in Mostert's Hoek coming back home from Vryburg, where he had been campaigning for the Parliament of the Cape of Good Hope as a candidate for the Afrikaner Bond. At the time of his death, he was working on building an elaborate observatory at his house, Ambleside, in Sea Point.

== Personal life ==
De Villiers and his wife Christina Maria Elizabeth de Vos had three sons.

== Sources ==
- (en) Potgieter, D.J. (chief ed.) 1972. Standard Encyclopaedia of Southern Africa. Cape Town: Nasionale Opvoedkundige Uitgewery.
- (af) Sandler, E.A. in Beyers, C.J. (chief ed.) (1981). Suid-Afrikaanse Biografiese Woordeboek, vol. IV. Durban: Butterworth & Kie (Edms) Bpk.
- (af) Van der Waal, Gerhard-Mark (1986). Van mynkamp tot metropolis. Die boukuns van Johannesburg, 1886–1940. Johannesburg: Chris van Rensburg Publikasies (Edms.) Beperk.
