= David Bunn =

South African cricketer

Personal information
- Full name: David Keith Clarence Bunn
- Born: 9 April 1992 (age 34); Pretoria, Transvaal, South Africa
- Batting: Left-handed
- Role: Batsman

Career statistics
Competition	FC	LA	T20
Matches	12	6	3
Runs scored	340	257	48
Batting average	16.19	51.40	24.00
100s/50s	0/1	1/2	0/0
Top score	61	106*	30*
Balls bowled	174	–	29
Wickets	2	–	3
Bowling average	59.50	–	5.33
5 wickets in innings	0	–	0
10 wickets in match	0	–	0
Best bowling	2/39	–	2/14
Catches/stumpings	6/–	2/–	0/–
- Source: Cricinfo, 2 February 2022

David Keith Clarence Bunn (born 9 April 1992) is a South African cricketer. He made his first-class debut on 2 February 2011, for Northerns against Western Province in the 2011-12 CSA Provincial 3-Day Challenge. Prior to his first-class debut, he was selected for South Africa's U19 squad to tour Zimbabwe. Bunn signed with Major League Cricket after moving to the United States and currently plays for the Bay Blazers in Minor League Cricket.
