= Dylan Jennings =

South African cricketer (born 1979)

Personal information
- Born: 14 September 1979 (age 47); Johannesburg, Transvaal Province, South Africa
- Source: ESPNcricinfo, 10 December 2016

Dylan Jennings (born 14 September 1979) is a South African former cricketer who played 34 first-class and 36 List A matches between 1999 and 2004.
