= Louis Vorster =

South African-Namibian cricketer

Personal information
- Full name: Louis Phillippus Vorster
- Born: 2 November 1966; Potchefstroom, Transvaal Province, South Africa
- Died: 17 April 2012 (aged 45); Pretoria, Gauteng Province, South Africa
- Batting: Left-handed
- Bowling: Right-arm off break

Domestic team information
- Years: Team
- 2008/09–2009/10: Namibia
- 1996/97–1997/98: North West
- 1993/94–1995/96: Northern Transvaal B
- 1990/91–1995/96: Northern Transvaal
- 1988: Worcestershire
- 1986/87–1989/90: Transvaal
- 1985/86–1989/90: Transvaal B

Career statistics
Competition	First-class	List A
Matches	95	96
Runs scored	4,786	2,186
Batting average	33.23	30.36
100s/50s	7/26	–/15
Top score	188	93*
Balls bowled	69	–
Wickets	1	–
Bowling average	41.00	–
5 wickets in innings	–	–
10 wickets in match	–	–
Best bowling	1/10	–
Catches/stumpings	59/–	25/–
- Source: CricketArchive, 16 October 2011

Louis Vorster (2 November 1966 – 17 April 2012) was a South African-Namibian cricketer. He was a left-handed batsman and a right-arm off-break bowler. He was born in Potchefstroom.

Vorster made his cricketing debut for Albatross cricket club on 1 July 1983, in a victory against the Sussex Second XI at Glynde. Vorster scored a duck in this first innings though the team were to create a victory with just one over to spare.

Vorster's first-class debut came in the 1985/86 Castle Bowl tournament, playing for Transvaal B against Eastern Province, and played in the Castle Currie Cup in the 1986/87 season. He became part of a South African invitation XI who played against an Australian XI in a South African tour of 1986/87, and, during the 1987 and 1988 English cricket seasons, played occasional games for the Warwickshire Second XI.

Playing for Transvaal until 1990, Vorster played for Northern Transvaal from this season onwards, in the B&H Series and the Castle Currie Cup, in its various guises.

Vorster continued to play for Northern Transvaal until the 1995/96 B&H Series, following which he moved to North West. Vorster played in the competition for North West until the 1998/99 season.

Nine years later, Vorster made a return to the first-class game, playing for the Namibian cricket team, for whom he made his debut in October 2007 against North West at the age of nearly 41.

Vorster was shot and killed during an armed robbery outside Pretoria on 17 April 2012. He was 45.
