= Turffontein =

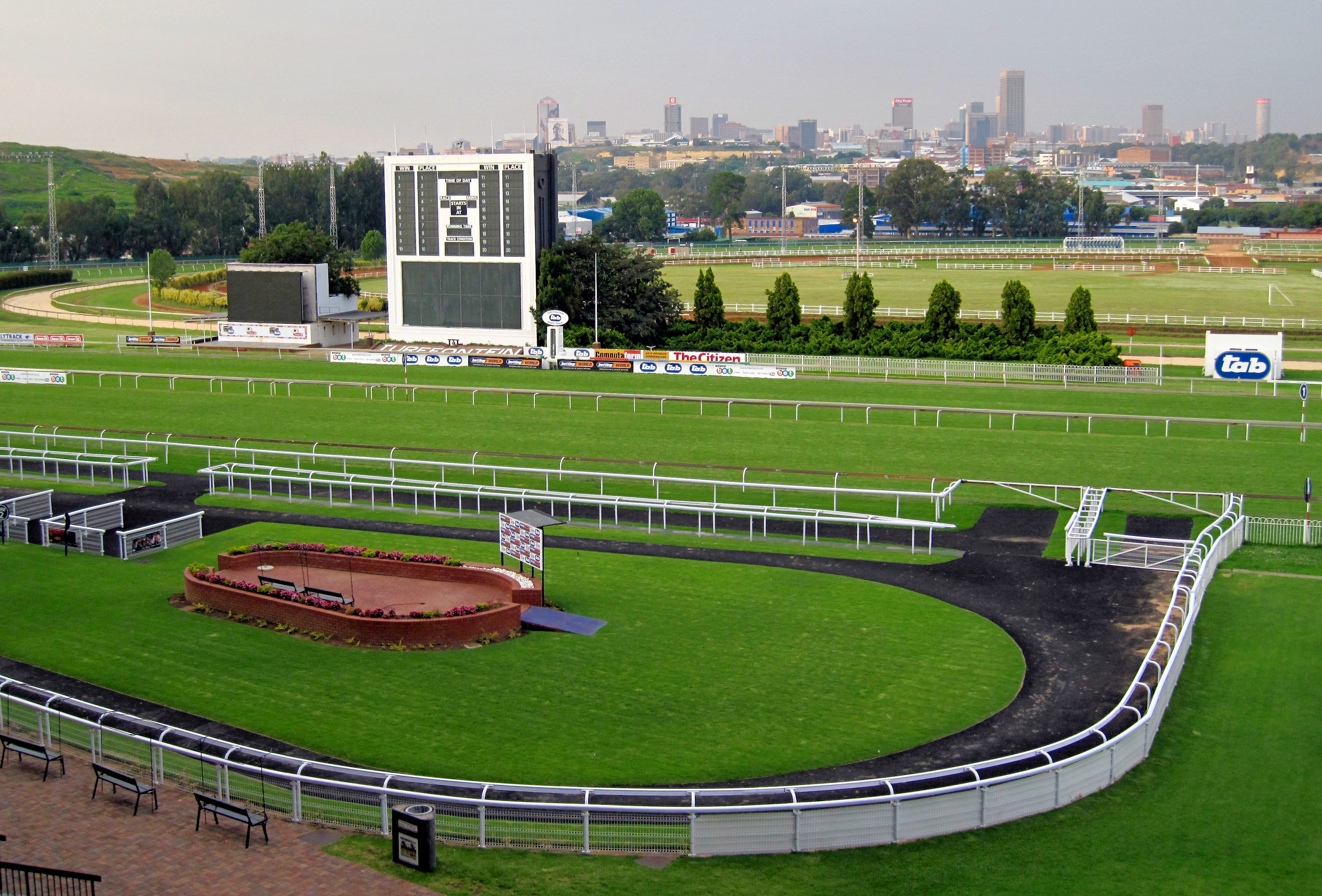
- Turffontein Racecourse

- Location within Gauteng Location within South Africa
- Coordinates: 26.2446°S 28.0397°E
- Country: South Africa
- Province: Gauteng
- Municipality: City of Johannesburg
- Main Place: Johannesburg
- Established: 1886

Area
  - Total: 2.63 km^{2} (1.02 sq mi)

Population (2011)
  - Total: 15,887
  - Density: 6,040/km^{2} (15,600/sq mi)

Racial makeup (2011)
  - Black African: 82.4%
  - Coloured: 5.7%
  - Indian/Asian: 2.0%
  - White: 8.7%
  - Other: 1.1%

First languages (2011)
  - Zulu: 22.1%
  - English: 17.5%
  - Xhosa: 15.0%
  - Southern Ndebele: 7.3%
  - Other: 38.1%
- Time zone: UTC+2 (SAST)
- Postal code (street): 2190
- PO box: 2140

Turffontein is a suburb of Johannesburg, South Africa. It is located in Region F of the City of Johannesburg Metropolitan Municipality.

== History ==
Prior to the discovery of gold on the Witwatersrand in 1886, the suburb lay on land on one of the original farms called Turffontein. It became a suburb on 27 September 1886.

== Sports ==
It is home to Turffontein Racecourse, established in 1887 by the Johannesburg Turf Club.
