= Burgersdorp =

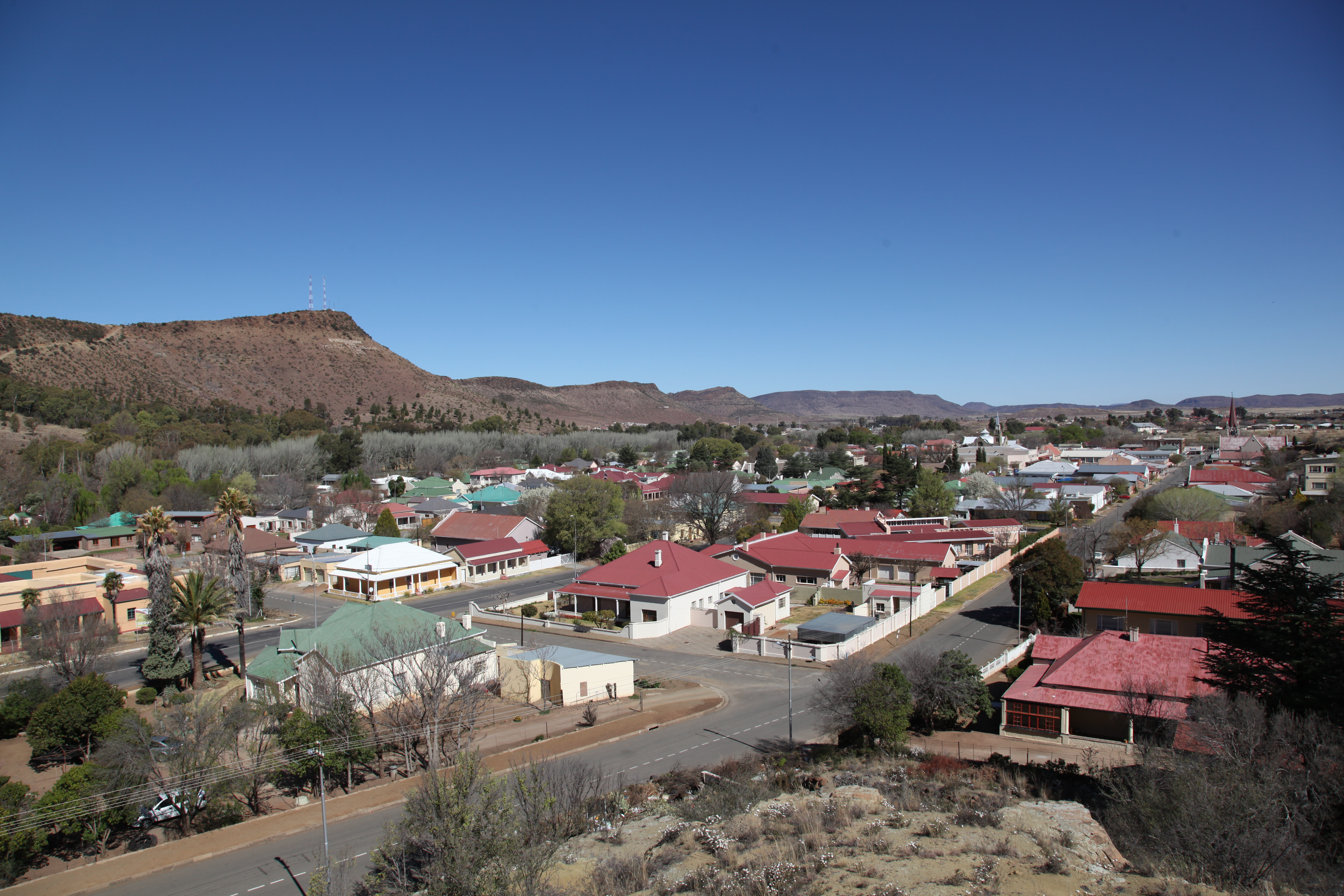
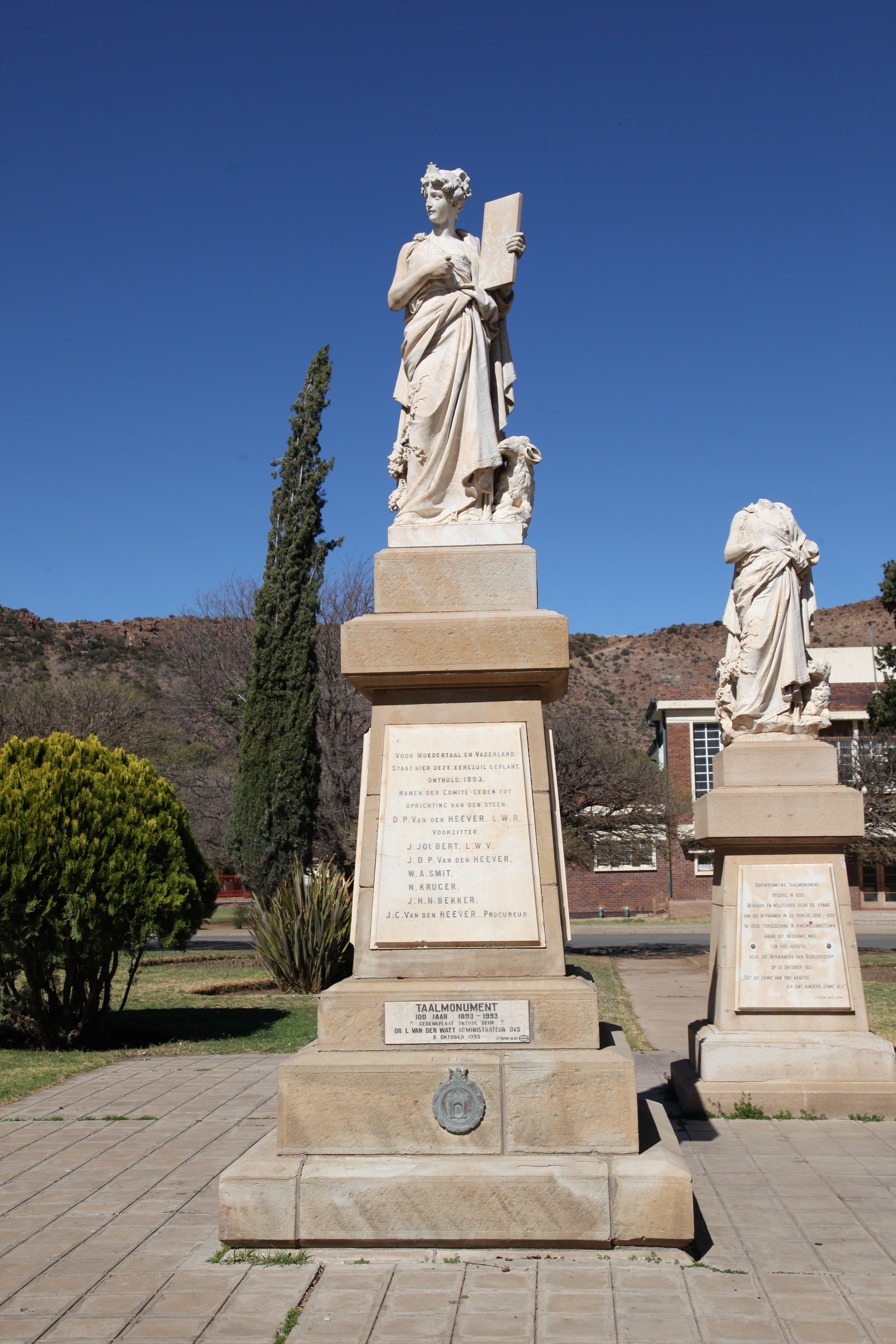
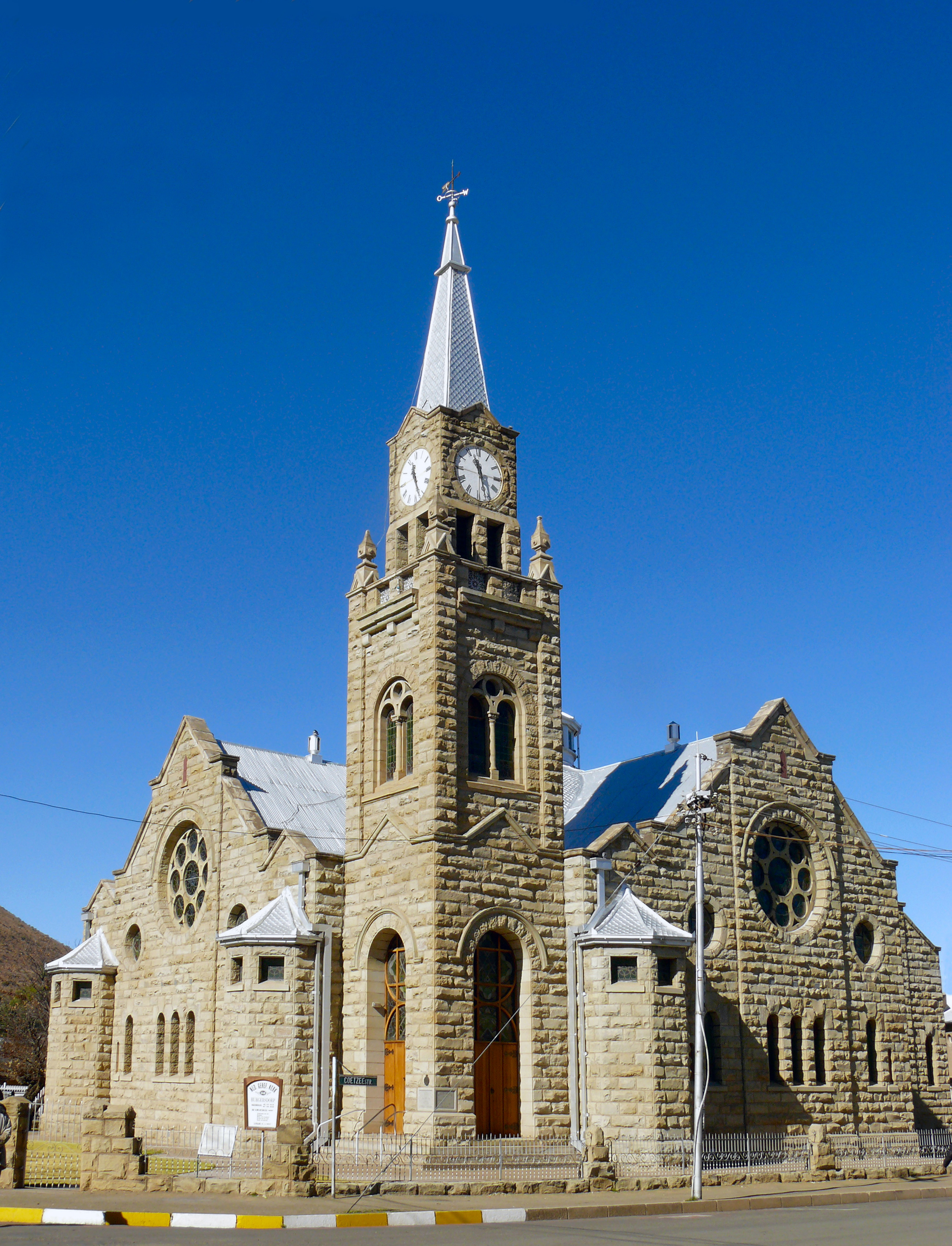
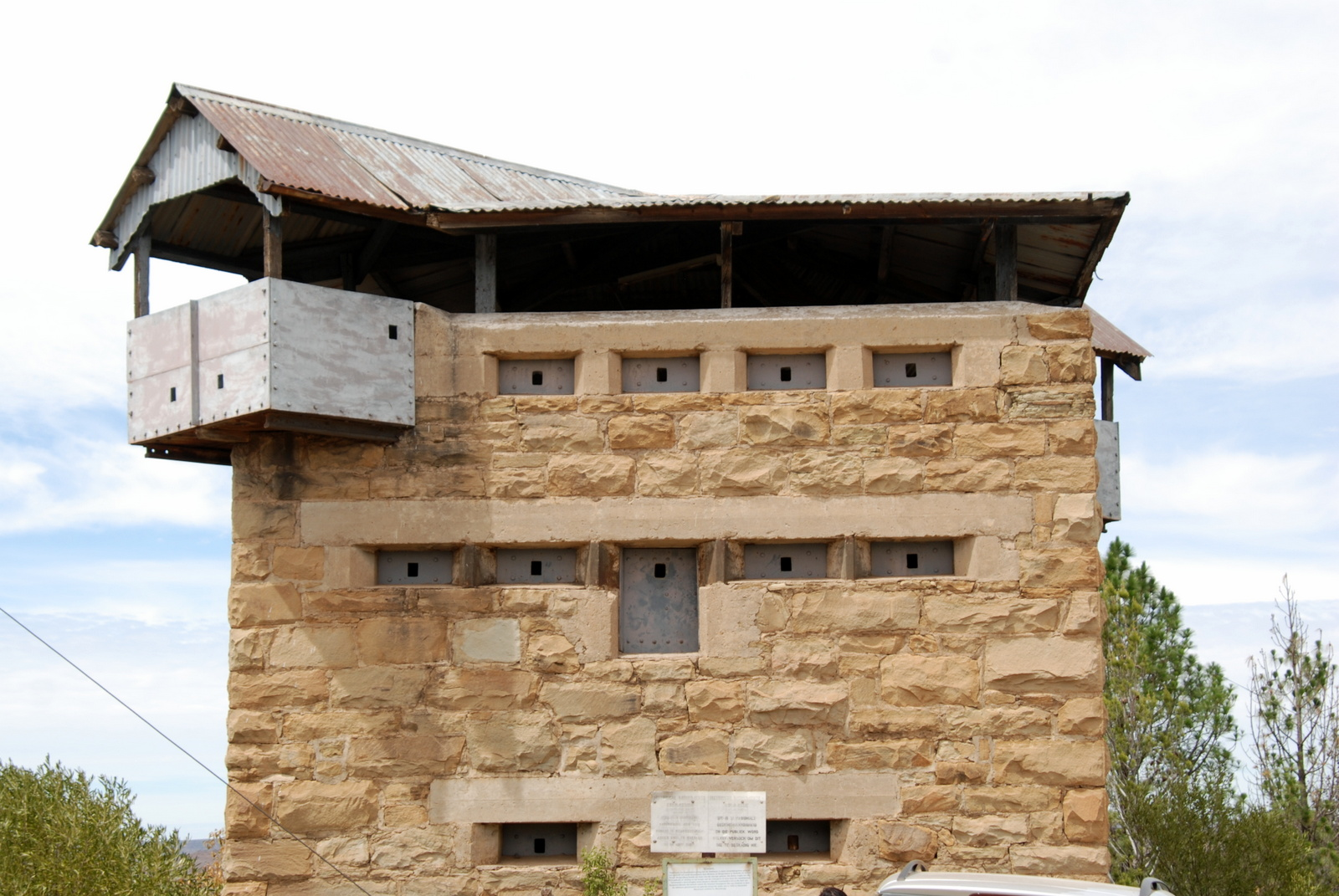
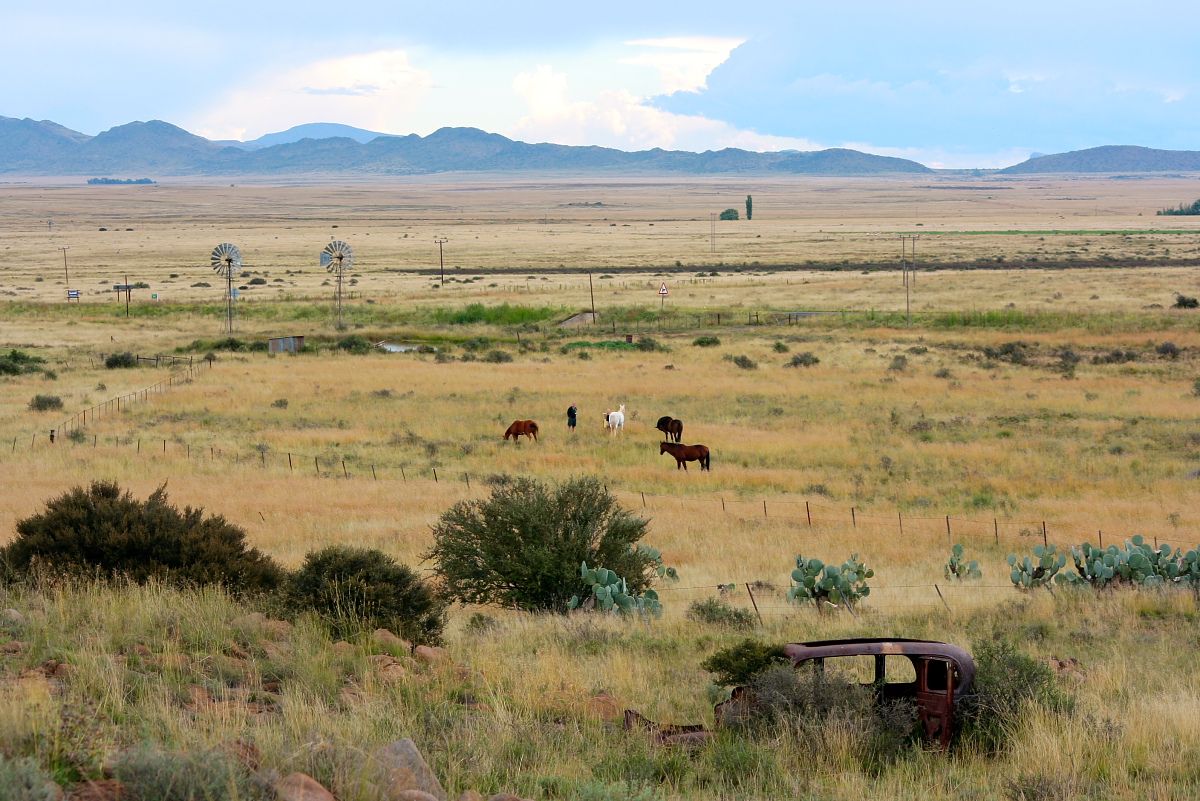
- Top: Burgersdorp viewed from The Sentinel blockhouse, Middle left: Dutch Language Monument, Middle Right: NG Church, Bottom left: The Sentinel Blockhouse, Bottom right: A farm near Burgersdorp

- Location within Eastern Cape Location within South Africa Location within Africa
- Coordinates: 30°59′32″S 26°19′29″E
- Country: South Africa
- Province: Eastern Cape
- District: Joe Gqabi
- Municipality: Walter Sisulu
- Established: 1846

Government
  - Type: Local Municipality
  - Mayor: Vania Davids (ANC)

Area
  - Total: 27.9 km^{2} (10.8 sq mi)
- Elevation: 1,405 m (4,610 ft)

Population (2011)
  - Total: 5,241
  - Density: 188/km^{2} (487/sq mi)

Racial makeup (2011)
  - Black African: 39.6%
  - Coloured: 31.0%
  - Indian/Asian: 0.7%
  - White: 28.7%
  - Other: 0.0%

First languages (2011)
  - Afrikaans: 62.9%
  - Xhosa: 30.0%
  - English: 2.9%
  - Sotho: 1.7%
  - Other: 2.5%
- Time zone: UTC+2 (SAST)
- Postal code (street): 9744
- PO box: 9744
- Area code: 051

Burgersdorp is a medium-sized town in Walter Sisulu Local Municipality in the Joe Gqabi District Municipality of the Eastern Cape province of South Africa.

In 1869 a Theological Seminary was established here by the Gereformeerde Kerk, but in 1905 it was moved to Potchefstroom, acting as an instrument in the formation of the PUK in 1919, then becoming the Potchefstroom University for Christian Higher Education in 1951.

The Afrikaner Bond political party was founded in Burgersdorp in 1881.

== Demographics ==
According to the 2011 census, the town of Burgersdorp proper has a population of 5,240, while the adjacent townships of Mzamomhle and Tembisa have populations of 4,656 and 6,094 respectively, giving the urban area a population of 15,990. Of this population 78.1% described themselves as Black African, 11.98% as Coloured and 9.4% as White. 69.2% spoke Xhosa as their home language, 20.1% spoke Afrikaans, 3.3% spoke Sotho, 1.4% spoke English as their home language and 6.0% spoke some other language.

== Transport ==
=== Rail ===
The first rail connection to Burgersdorp was opened on 19 March 1885. Today Shosholoza Meyl provides passenger rail service to Burgersdorp on its Johannesburg-Bloemfontein-East London route.

=== Road ===
Burgersdorp is located on the junction of the R58 between Aliwal North and Venterstad; and the R391 leading to Hofmeyr, Molteno and Steynsburg.

== Society ==
=== Sport ===
Match 18 of the 1910 British Lions tour to South Africa was played in Burgersdorp.

=== Museums, monuments and memorials ===
Ten of the Eastern Cape's provincial heritage sites can be found in Burgersdorp. They include the Christ Church, the Coetzee House, the De Bruin House, the Jubilee Fountain, the Old Goal, the Old Reformed Church Parsonage, the Old Reformed Church Theological Seminary as well as the three listed below in more detail.

==== Dutch Reformed Church ====
This church was declared a provincial heritage site in 1996.

==== Blockhouse ====
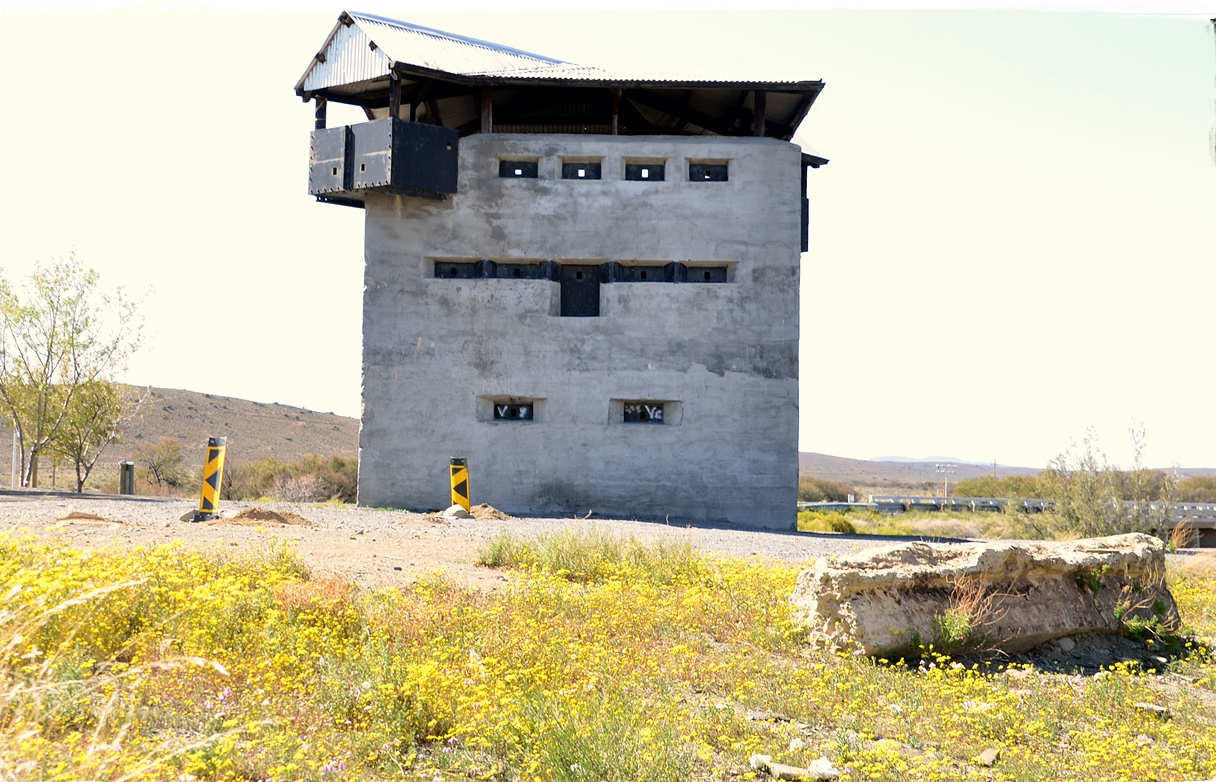
Anglo-Boer War blockhouse in spring

A Second Boer War blockhouse overlooking the town, commonly known as the Sentinel was declared a provincial heritage site in 1939.

==== Dutch Language Monument ====
A monument to Dutch, built in 1893 is located in the town. The monument depicts a woman pointing her finger at a book in her hands. This monument was declared a provincial heritage site in 1937.

Although the main inscription on that monument refers to the Hollandse taal (Dutch language), it can be understood to mean Afrikaans, because the Hollandse taal in South Africa was only split since 1925. But the monument is officially recognised as a monument to Dutch.

The monument was damaged during the Anglo-Boer War, and Lord Milner had it removed. It was replaced with a replica in 1907. The original was later discovered in King William's Town in 1939, and moved back to stand next to the replica in Burgersdorp.

Some sources claim Lord Milner had removed the original monument not because it was damaged, but because he was opposed to Dutch (and Afrikaans), and that the replica was built not by government but by a group of Afrikaners.

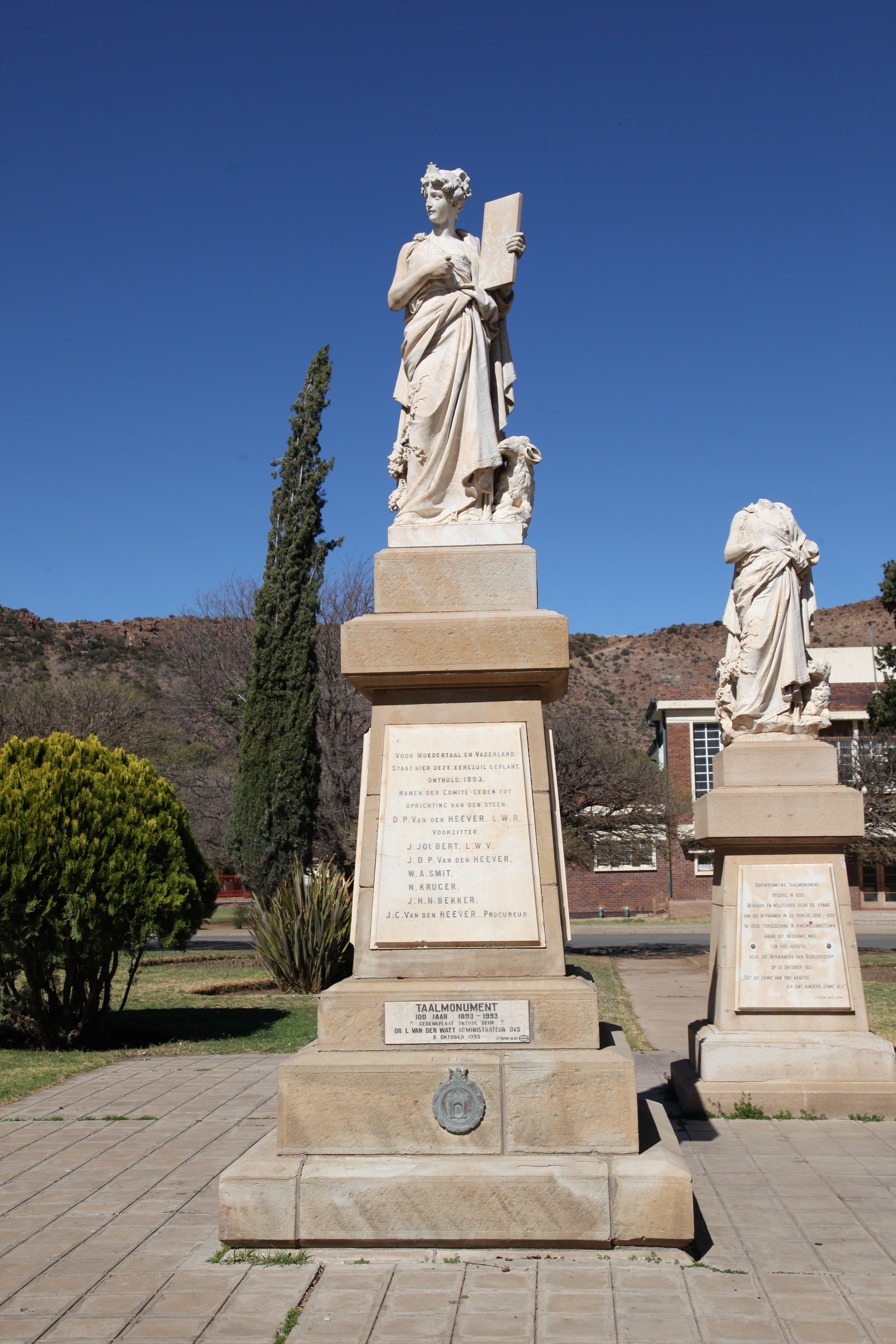
The replica (left) and original (right) Dutch Language Monuments

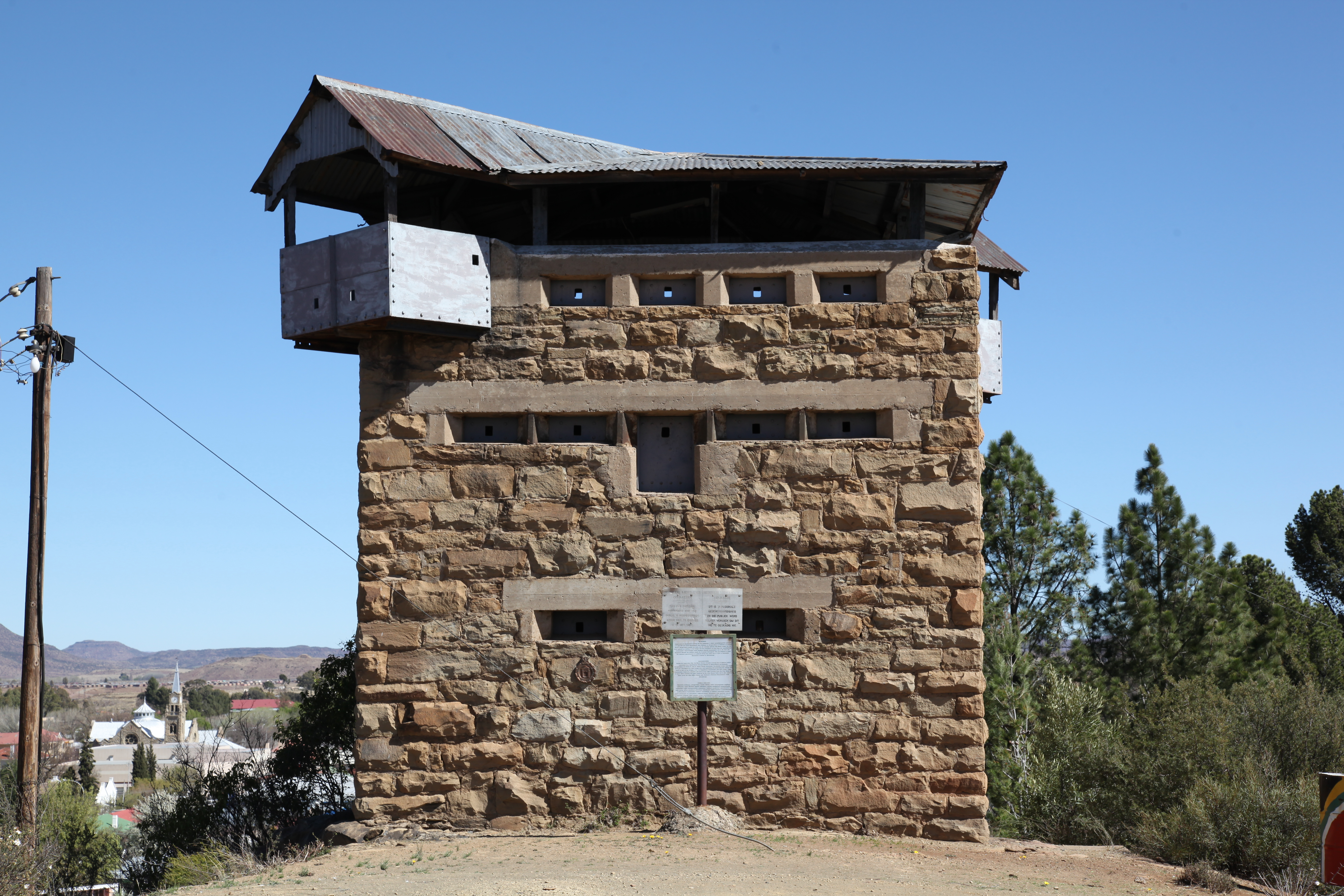
The Sentinel Blockhouse

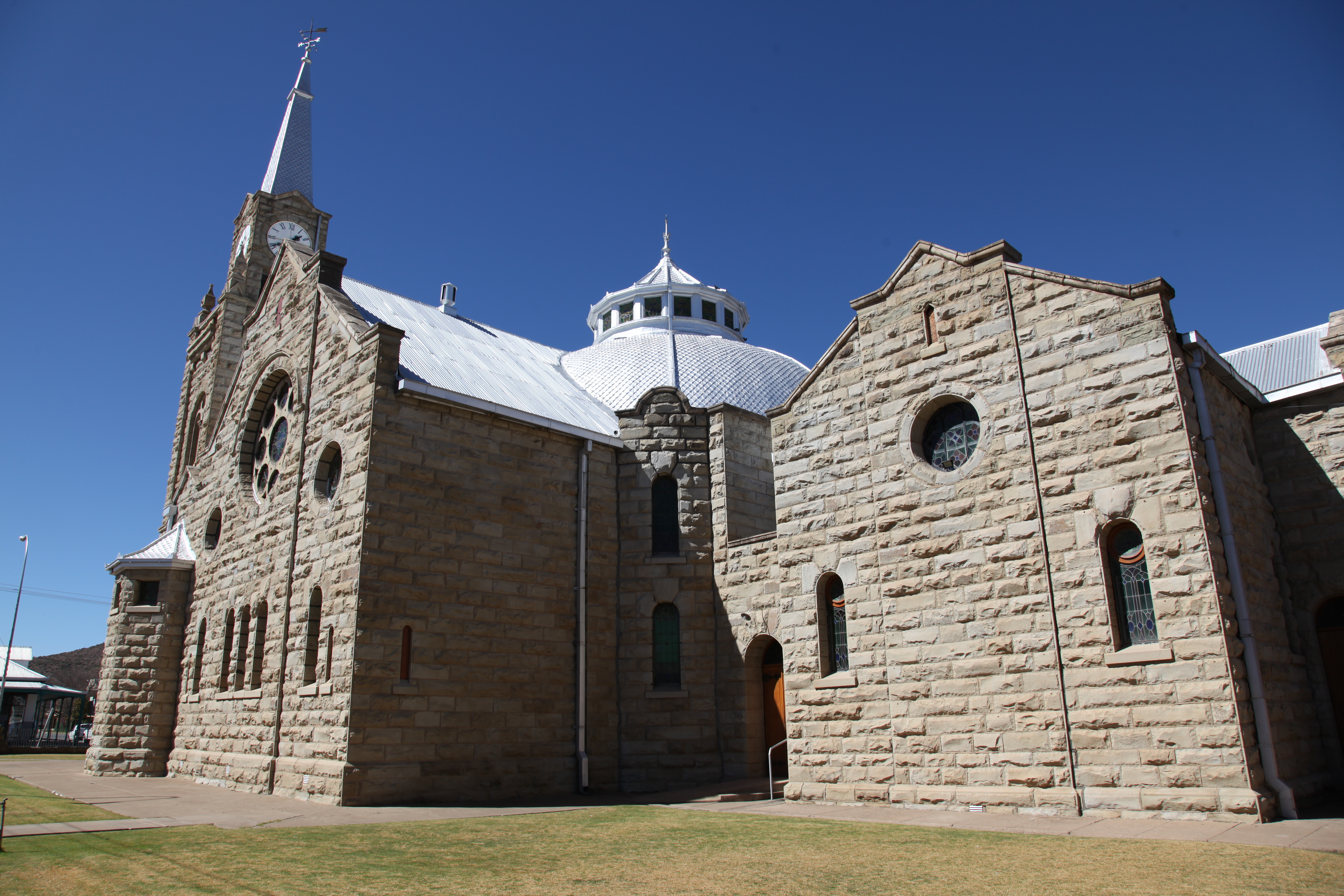
The Dutch Reformed Church

== Education ==
Burgersdorp has 5 primary schools and 2 high schools

- PRIMARY SCHOOLS*

Mzimkhulu Primary School

Mpumelelo Mfundisi Public Primary School

Maruping Primary School

Eureka Primary School

Burgersdorp Laerskool

- HIGH SCHOOLS*

Ethembeni Senior Secondary School

Burgersdorp Hoerskool
