= Kenneth Jennings (cricketer) =

South African cricketer (born 1953)

Personal information
- Born: 25 August 1953 (age 73); Vanderbijlpark, Union of South Africa
- Source: ESPNcricinfo, 10 December 2016

Kenneth Jennings (born 25 August 1953) is a South African former cricketer who played five first-class matches for Northerns between 1981 and 1983.
