= List of Gauteng representative cricketers =

This is a partial list of cricketers who have played first-class, List A cricket, or Twenty20 cricket for Transvaal and Gauteng in South Africa. The team was renamed ahead of the 1997–98 season following the renaming of Transvaal province as Gauteng in 1994.

Transvaal made its first-class debut during the 1889–90 season, playing against Kimberley in the first Currie Cup match. (Note: The first domestic first-class matches in South Africa were played during the same season on Natal's tour of Cape Colony. The 1889–90 Currie Cup match was played after the five matches which have first-class status on the tour. The competition was a single match in its first season. Two Test matches played the previous season between South Africa and a touring English team are considered the first matches played in South Africa to have first-class status.) From that date the matches it played in the competition are considered first-class. The Transvaal B team joined the Currie Cup B section in 1959–60, and matches involving the B team are considered first-class in the competition. Following the renaming of the team as Gauteng, the B section competition continued, although the Gauteng B team did not take part. In 2019–20 and 2020–21 the Gauteng team was sometimes listed as Central Gauteng.

Transvaal first played List A cricket in 1970–71, the first season of provincial List A cricket in South Africa. (Note: The 1969–70 Gillette Cup competition had taken place the previous season, but teams did not use their provincial names. The team that represented Transvaal was organised by Ali Bacher and known as A Bacher's XI. It played two matches. All 13 of the cricketers who played for the team also played matches for Transvaal or Transvaal B so, by default, appear on this list.) Gauteng first played domestic Twenty20 cricket in the first season of the CSA Provincial T20 in 2011–12.

This list includes the players who played first-class and List A cricket for Transvaal and Transvaal B between 1889–90 and 1997–98, and those who played first-class, List A, and Twenty20 cricket for Gauteng and Central Gauteng from 1997–98 to the present day. (Note: Transvaal XIs played two additional first-class matches, one in 1913–14 against the touring England team, and one in 1970–71 against The Rest, and a Gauteng XI played a first-class match in 1998–99 against the England A team. Several of the players who appeared for Transvaal in these matches did not otherwise play for the provincial team. They are listed separately at the bottom of this list.) It does not include players who appeared only for franchise team Lions which was operated by the Gauteng and North West Cricket Unions between 2003–04 and 2020–21. (Note: These players who played for the franchise team are listed at List of Lions (South Africa) cricketers.) Nor does it include the cricketers who played for the Transvaal team in 108 first-class Howa Bowl matches organised by the South African Cricket Board between 1971–72 and 1990–91. (Note: These matches were organised by a different board of control under the apartheid system in South Africa. They were intended to be played by non-white players and were not seen as first-class until a retrospective ruling by the United Cricket Board.)

As of 14 July 2025

== A ==
- HD Ackerman
- Brendon Adams
- Neil Adcock
- George Allsop
- Sean Andrews
- Matthew Arnold
- Alfred Atfield

== B ==
- Adam Bacher
- Ali Bacher
- Abe Bailey
- Threlfall Baines
- Xen Balaskas
- Clifford Barker
- Eddie Barlow
- Brian Barnard
- Abdullatief Barnes
- Alan Barrow
- Brian Bath
- Harold Baumgartner
- Temba Bavuma
- Rolland Beaumont
- Danzel Becker
- Denis Begbie
- Mark Benfield
- Kenny Benjamin
- Izak Cornelis Bergh
- Gordon Beves
- George Bissett
- Joseph Blewett
- Ernest Bock
- Gulam Bodi
- Tladi Bokako
- Kenneth Bond
- Neil Boonzaaier
- Piet Botha
- Monty Bowden
- Dooley Briscoe
- Lennox Brown
- Graham Bunyard
- Nandre Burger
- Shane Burger

== C ==
- Jock Cameron
- Tom Campbell
- Peter Carlstein
- Ronald Carr
- Claude Carter
- Bob Catterall
- Carey Cawood
- Jim Christy
- Geoff Chubb
- Thomas Clack
- Sylvester Clarke
- Chad Classen
- John Cochran
- Shunter Coen
- James Connerty
- Myles Conte
- Devon Conway
- Dalton Conyngham
- Arthur Cook
- Jimmy Cook
- Stephen Cook
- Yassar Cook
- Alfred E Cooper
- Alfred HC Cooper
- Davey Cope
- Peter Corbett
- William Creese
- Vernon Cresswell
- Basil Crews
- Derek Crookes
- Daryll Cullinan
- Syd Curnow

== D ==
- Junior Dala
- Douglas Davies
- Eric Davies
- Noel Day
- Zander de Bruyn
- Quinton de Kock
- Sebastian de Oliveira
- Peter de Vaal
- Nummy Deane
- Dale Deeb
- Bradley Dial
- Archibald Difford
- Nazier Dindar
- Stephen Dinsdale
- Tshepang Dithole
- Cec Dixon
- Thomas Dixon
- Peter Dodds
- Francois Drummer
- Keith Dudgeon
- William Duff
- Louis Duffus
- Richard Dumbrill
- Jacobus Duminy
- Jacobus du Toit
- Sydney du Toit
- David Dyer

== E ==
- David Eaton
- Clive Eksteen
- Grant Elliott
- Frank Elworthy
- Steve Elworthy
- Russell Endean
- Justin Engelke
- Roddy Estwick

== F ==
- Neil Fairbrother
- Aubrey Faulkner
- Norman Featherstone
- Jonathan Fellows-Smith
- David Fernley
- Charlie Finlason
- Claude Floquet
- William Foley
- James Forrest
- Bjorn Fortuin
- Neil Foster
- Henry Fotheringham
- Charlie Frank
- James Fuller
- George Fullerton
- Ian Fullerton
- Ken Funston
- Neil Fusedale

== G ==
- Douglas Gain
- John Gartly
- Keith Gibbs
- Ottis Gibson
- Frederick Goldstein
- Norman Gordon
- Chad Grainger
- Vivian Greve
- Ronnie Grieveson
- Stephanus Grobler

== H ==
- Alf Hall
- Andrew Hall
- Ernest Halliwell
- Eric Hamilton
- Charles Handfield
- Rupert Hanley
- Tony Harris
- Spranger Harrison
- Maitland Hathorn
- Mike Haysman
- Tim Heaney
- Philip Hearle
- Percy Heather
- Alan Hector
- Peter Heine
- Dudley Helfrich
- James Henderson
- Beuran Hendricks
- Dominic Hendricks
- Reeza Hendricks
- John Hickson
- Mackie Hobson
- Brendan Horan
- David Howell
- Graham Hume
- Richard Hutton

== I ==
- Gerald Innes
- David Ironside
- Lee Irvine

== J ==
- Steven Jack
- Dirk Jackson
- Sean Jamison
- Dylan Jennings
- Keaton Jennings
- Clement Johnson
- Graham Johnson

== K ==
- Alvin Kallicharran
- Ari Karvelas
- George Kempis
- Kevin Kerr
- Frederick Klinck
- Johannes Kotze
- Alan Kourie
- Garnett Kruger
- Ian Kuiler

== L ==
- Henry Lacey
- Dean Laing
- Tiger Lance
- Juan Landsberg
- Arthur Langton
- Eddie Leie
- Carmi le Roux
- Fred le Roux
- Denis Lindsay
- Johnny Lindsay
- Neville Lindsay
- Edrich Lubbe
- Bill Lundie
- Rowan Lyle

== M ==
- Sibley McAdam
- Mike Macaulay
- George McCubbin
- Matt McGillivray
- James Mackay
- Donald Mackay-Coghill
- Graham McKenzie
- Kevin McKenzie
- Neil McKenzie
- Atholl McKinnon
- Brian McMillan
- Quintin McMillan
- Sisanda Magala
- Rashaad Magiet
- John Maile
- William Malraison
- Jack Manack (Note: Manack also played for the Transvaal SACB team.)
- Levert Manje
- Colin Maritz
- Hugh Martin
- Edward Marvin
- Eric Marx
- Sizwe Masondo
- Brett Matthews
- Muhammed Mayet
- Doug Meintjes
- Basil Melle
- Michael Melle
- Alan Melville
- Jacob Miltz
- Bruce Mitchell
- Frank Mitchell
- Karabo Mogotsi
- Grant Mokoena
- Lazarus Mokoena
- Kgaudisa Molefe
- Jacky Morkel
- Mangaliso Mosehle
- Herbert Mosenthal
- John Moulder
- Eric Murray
- Robbie Muzzell
- Ndumiso Mvelase

== N ==
- Peter Needham
- Douglas Neilson
- Vivian Neser
- Claude Newberry
- William Newby
- Lewis Newnham
- Bob Newson
- Enoch Nkwe
- Malcolm Nofal
- Richard Norden
- Dave Nourse
- Buster Nupen

== O ==
- Arthur Ochse
- Sid O'Linn
- Duanne Olivier
- Rodney Ontong
- Ethan O'Reilly

== P ==
- Hugh Page
- Dante Parkin
- Bryce Parsons
- Sid Pegler
- Nqaba Peter
- Aaron Phangiso
- John Phillips
- Roy Pienaar
- Shaylen Pillay
- David Pithey
- John Piton
- Andrew Pollock
- Anthony Pollock
- Graeme Pollock
- Nono Pongolo
- Frank Porter
- Delano Potgieter
- Nic Pothas

== Q ==
- Neville Quinn

== R ==
- Kagiso Rabada
- Neal Radford
- Omphile Ramela
- Masilo Ramothata
- Thamsanqa Rapelego
- Kagiso Rapulana
- Richard Reid
- Clive Rice
- Joshua Richards
- Ryan Rickelton
- Warne Rippon
- Bruce Roberts
- Grant Roelofsen
- Alby Rose
- Franklyn Rose
- Albert Rose-Innes
- Thomas Routledge
- Athol Rowan
- Eric Rowan
- Mark Rushmere
- Ken Rutherford

== S ==
- Zaid Saloojee
- Farhaan Sayanvala
- Brett Schultz
- Reggie Schwarz
- Malcolm Scott
- Arthur Seccull
- Lawrence Seeff
- Louis Serrurier
- Andre Seymore
- William Shalders
- Tabraiz Shamsi
- Warren Shankland
- Cameron Shekleton
- George Shepstone
- Percy Sherwell
- Malusi Siboto
- Jimmy Sinclair
- C. Aubrey Smith
- Charlie Smith
- Frank Smith (umpire)
- Fred Smith
- Graeme Smith
- Harry Smith
- Steve Smith
- Richard Snell
- Stanley Snooke
- Tip Snooke
- William Solomon
- Sidney Stanley
- Chris Stephens
- Godfrey Steyn
- Stephen Steyn
- Matthew Street
- Henry Stricker
- Louis Stricker
- Fred Susskind
- Warren Swan
- Malcolm Sylvester
- Jean Symes

== T ==
- Bernard Tancred
- Louis Tancred
- Vincent Tancred
- Arthur Tayfield
- Hugh Tayfield
- Herbie Taylor
- Scotch Taylor
- David Terbrugge
- Lefa Thaba
- George Thornton
- Tony Tillim
- Tumelo Tlhokwe
- Frank Townsend
- Geoffrey Toyana
- Nicholas Trainor
- Freddy Turner
- Graeme Turner

== U ==
- Clive Ulyate

== V ==
- Mitchell Van Buuren
- Aldo van den Berg
- Vintcent van der Bijl
- Rassie van der Dussen
- David van der Knaap
- Edward van der Merwe
- Jonathan Vandiar
- Matthew Vandrau
- Vaughn van Jaarsveld
- Diaan van Wyk
- Derek Varnals
- Kosie Venter
- Dane Vilas
- Ken Viljoen
- Cyril Vincent
- Charles Vintcent
- Bert Vogler
- Louis Vorster

== W ==
- John Waite
- Peter Walker
- Benjamin Wallach
- Kenneth Walter
- Tommy Ward
- Frank Warne
- Gary Watson
- Francois Weideman
- Brad White
- Gordon White
- Ray White
- George Wienand
- Joseph Wilson
- Bentley Wimble
- Clarence Wimble
- Paul Winslow
- Rex Witte
- Owen Wynne

== Y ==
- Mandy Yachad
- Codi Yusuf

== Z ==
- Billy Zulch

== Transvaal XI players ==
The following players appeared in first-class matches for Transvaal XIs, but did not appear for the Transvaal representative team in provincial matches.

- Charles Lambe
- J Lawrence
- John Milton
- Barry Richards
- Sydney Tross
