= List of Lions (South Africa) cricketers =

This is a list of cricketers who played for the South African franchise Lions cricket team between the 2003–04 season and 2020–21. It includes the players who appeared for the team in first-class, List A and Twenty20 competitions during the period in which the team was a franchise.

During 2003, Cricket South Africa changed the way in which top-class domestic cricket in the country was organised. This created six franchise teams at the top level of domestic competition, combining the existing provincial teams to create an elite competition. The Lions franchise was formed by combining the Gauteng cricket team from Gauteng province and North West cricket team from North West province. (Note: Gauteng was previously named Transvaal. The area covered by North West province had largely been within the area of Transvaal prior to North West becoming a province in 1994.) Initially the team competed in the 2003–04 CSA T20 Challenge, before the CSA 4-Day Domestic Series and CSA One-Day Cup also became franchise-only competitions the following season.

During the period of franchise competitions, Gauteng and North West continued to compete as separate cricket unions in the CSA 3-Day and One-Day Cups and CSA T20 competitions. The period of franchise competition lasted until the end of the 2020–21 season when Cricket South Africa reverted to a division based provincial competition, with both teams competing separately from the start of the 2021–22 season. Many of the senior provincial unions which had been involved in franchise competitions retained the names of their franchises as marketing tools. Gauteng, the senior team in the Lions franchise, chose to do so and compete using the name Lions.

== A ==
- HD Ackerman
- Marques Ackerman
- Brendon Adams
- Qaasim Adams
- Andrea Agathangelou
- Muhammad Akoojee
- Craig Alexander
- Matthew Arnold
- Azhar Mahmood

== B ==
- Adam Bacher
- Temba Bavuma
- Goolam Bhayat
- Andy Blignaut
- Gulam Bodi
- Tladi Bokako
- Thando Bula
- Nandre Burger
- Shane Burger

== C ==
- Richard Cameron
- Jaco Campher
- Saurab Chatterjee
- Werner Coetsee
- Devon Conway
- Stephen Cook
- Yassar Cook
- Derek Crookes

== D ==
- Junior Dala
- Richard Das Neves
- Cliff Deacon
- Gerry de Bruin
- Zander de Bruyn
- Dale Deeb
- Quinton de Kock
- Cameron Delport
- Friedel de Wet
- Johannes Diseko
- Keith Dudgeon
- Warren Dugmore

== F ==
- Bjorn Fortuin
- Robert Frylinck

== G ==
- Chris Gayle
- Etienne Gerber
- Ugasen Govender
- Ryan Groeneveld

== H ==
- Ruan Haasbroek
- Andrew Hall
- Steve Harmison
- Matthew Harris
- Paul Harris
- Eldred Hawken
- Claude Henderson
- Tyron Henderson
- Beuran Hendricks
- Dominic Hendricks
- Reeza Hendricks

== I ==
- Imran Tahir

== J ==
- Sean Jamison

== K ==
- Yunus Keiller
- Jimmy Kgamadi
- Dieter Klein
- Garnett Kruger

== L ==
- Charl Langeveldt
- Eddie Leie
- Carmi le Roux
- Heinrich le Roux
- Juan le Roux
- Wihan Lubbe

== M ==
- Matt McGillivray
- Neil McKenzie
- Johnson Mafa
- Sisanda Magala
- Dumisa Makalima
- Wandile Makwetu
- Andre Malan
- Janneman Malan
- Ashraf Mall
- Levert Manje
- Wesley Marshall
- Sizwe Masondo
- Brian Mathebula
- Pumelela Matshikwe
- Dyllan Matthews
- Vusumuzi Mazibuko
- Grant Mokoena
- Eugene Moleon
- Chris Morris (cricketer)
- Mangaliso Mosehle
- William Motaung
- Wiaan Mulder
- Ayavuya Myoli

== N ==
- Dirk Nannes
- André Nel
- Enoch Nkwe

== O ==
- Ahmed Omar
- Justin Ontong
- Ethan O'Reilly
- Marthinus Otto

== P ==
- Monty Panesar
- Bryce Parsons
- Brett Pelser
- Alviro Petersen
- Aaron Phangiso
- Shaylen Pillay
- Nono Pongolo
- Delano Potgieter
- Dwaine Pretorius
- Migael Pretorius

== R ==
- Kagiso Rabada
- Omphile Ramela
- Kagiso Rapulana
- Joshua Richards
- Ryan Rickelton
- Garth Roe
- Grant Rowley

== S ==
- Mpho Sekhoto
- Lesego Senokwane
- Tabraiz Shamsi
- Malusi Siboto
- Yadene Singh
- Lutho Sipamla
- Blake Snijman
- Sohail Tanvir
- Driaan Steyn
- Warren Swan
- Jean Symes

== T ==
- David Terbrugge
- Alfonso Thomas
- Thami Tsolekile
- Lonwabo Tsotsobe

== V ==
- Yaseen Valli
- Mitchell van Buuren
- Nicky van den Bergh
- Rassie van der Dussen
- Jonathan Vandiar
- Vaughn van Jaarsveld
- Diaan van Wyk
- Dane Vilas
- Hardus Viljoen

== W ==
- Lizaad Williams
