= James Fuller =

James or Jim Fuller may refer to:

== Athletes ==
- James Fuller (American football) (born 1969), American football player and coach
- James Fuller (cricketer, born 1990), New Zealand cricketer, played for Otago, Gloucestershire, Auckland and Middlesex
- James Fuller (Rhodesian cricketer) (1916–1976), Rhodesian cricketer, played for Rhodesia and Transvaal 1935–48
- Jim Fuller (American football) (1945–2021), American college football player and coach, college athletics administrator
- Jim Fuller (outfielder) (born 1950), former Major League Baseball outfielder for the Houston Astros
- Jim Fuller (footballer) (born 1943), Australian rules footballer
- Jimmy Fuller (1892–1987), American baseball player

== Others ==
- James Fuller (automobile executive) (1938–1988), U.S. automobile executive
- James B. Fuller (born 1949), American politician from Florida
- James Franklin Fuller (1835–1924), Irish actor, architect and novelist
- James W. Fuller Jr. (1843–1910), American industrialist
- Jim Fuller (musician) (1947–2017), American musician and member of The Surfaris
- James A. Fuller, British army officer and architect
