= George Miley =

George Miley may refer to:

- George H. Miley (born 1933), physicist, professor emeritus at University of Illinois
- George K. Miley (born 1942), physicist, professor of astronomy at Leiden University

== See also ==
- Miley (surname)
- Miley (disambiguation)
