= English cricket team in South Africa in 1909–10 =

International cricket tour

England in South Africa in 1909–10
	England	South Africa
- Dates: 1 December 1909 – 14 March 1910
Captains	H. D. G. Leveson Gower (1st–3rd Test); F. L. Fane (4th–5th Test)	S. J. Snooke

Test series
- Result: South Africa won the 5-match series 3–2
Most runs	J. B. Hobbs (539)	G. A. Faulkner (545)
Most wickets	G. H. T. Simpson-Hayward (23)	A. E. E. Vogler (36)

The tour by the English cricket team in South Africa in 1909–10 was organised by Marylebone Cricket Club (MCC). The team played as MCC in the non-Test fixtures and as England in the five Test matches. They played 14 first-class matches including the Tests, winning 7 times with 3 draws and 4 defeats.

England was captained by H. D. G. Leveson Gower. South Africa's captain in the Test series was Tip Snooke.

== Test series summary ==
South Africa won the Test series 3–2.

Match length: 5 days (excluding Sundays). Balls per over: 6.

=== First Test ===
1–5 January 1910
Scorecard

South Africa	v	England
208 (63 overs); G. A. Faulkner 78; G. H. T. Simpson-Hayward 6/43 (16 overs)		310 (90.1 overs); J. B. Hobbs 89; A. E. E. Vogler 5/87 (30.1 overs)
345 (114 overs); G. A. Faulkner 123; C. P. Buckenham 4/110 (39 overs)		224 (53.2 overs); G. J. Thompson 63; A. E. E. Vogler 7/94 (22 overs)

South Africa won by 19 runs
Old Wanderers, Johannesburg
Umpires: A. J. Atfield and F. W. Grey

- South Africa won the toss and elected to bat.
- 2 January was taken as a rest day
- Billy Zulch, Louis Stricker, Mick Commaille, and Tom Campbell (all SA), and Morice Bird, Claude Buckenham, H. D. G. Leveson-Gower, George Simpson-Hayward, and Bert Strudwick (all ENG) made their Test debuts.
- Simpson-Hayward, the last of the great lob bowlers, and playing in his only Test series, dismissed Zulch with his fifth ball, and returned his best Test analysis at the first attempt.

=== Second Test ===
21–26 January 1910
Scorecard

South Africa	v	England
199 (106.5 overs); T. Campbell 48; G. H. T. Simpson-Hayward 4/42 (23.5 overs)		199 (75.1 overs); J. B. Hobbs 53; A. E. E. Vogler 5/83 (30 overs)
347 (130.2 overs); G. C. White 118; G. H. T. Simpson-Hayward 3/66 (23 overs)		252 (82.4 overs); J. B. Hobbs 70; G. A. Faulkner 6/87 (33.4 overs)

South Africa won by 95 runs
Lord's, Durban
Umpires: F. W. Grey and F. E. Smith

- South Africa won the toss and elected to bat.
- 23 January was taken as a rest day
- The first Test ever to have a tie in first innings scores.

=== Third Test ===
26 February–3 March 1910
Scorecard

South Africa	v	England
305 (84 overs); G. A. Faulkner 76; C. P. Buckenham 5/115 (31 overs)		322 (82.4 overs); D. Denton 104; G. A. Faulkner 4/89 (30 overs)
237 (90.1 overs); S. J. Snooke 52; G. H. T. Simpson-Hayward 5/69 (22 overs)		221/7 (58.4 overs); J. B. Hobbs 93*; A. E. E. Vogler 4/109 (25 overs)

England won by 3 wickets
Old Wanderers, Johannesburg
Umpires: A. J. Atfield and F. W. Grey

- South Africa won the toss and elected to bat.
- 27 February was taken as a rest day
- Claude Floquet and Sid Pegler (both SA) made their Test debuts.

=== Fourth Test ===
7–9 March 1910
Scorecard

England	v	South Africa
203 (53 overs); F. E. Woolley 69; G. C. White 2/5 (1 over)		207 (67 overs); J. M. M. Commaille 42; G. J. Thompson 4/50 (16 overs)
178 (51.3 overs); F. E. Woolley 64; A. E. E. Vogler 5/72 (21.3 overs)		175/6 (59.3 overs); G. A. Faulkner 49*; G. J. Thompson 3/62 (20.3 overs)

South Africa won by 4 wickets
Newlands, Cape Town
Umpires: A. J. Atfield and S. L. Harris

- England won the toss and elected to bat.

=== Fifth Test ===
11–14 March 1910
Scorecard

England	v	South Africa
417 (108.2 overs); J. B. Hobbs 187; N. O. Norton 4/47 (15 overs)		103 (38.5 overs); J. W. Zulch 43*; C. Blythe 7/46 (18 overs)
16/1 (4.1 overs); D. Denton 16*; A. E. E. Vogler 1/16 (2.1 overs)		327 (f/o) (99 overs); G. A. Faulkner 99; F. E. Woolley 3/47 (13 overs)

England won by 9 wickets
Newlands, Cape Town
Umpires: A. J. Atfield and S. L. Harris

- England won the toss and elected to bat.
- 13 March was taken as a rest day
- Norman Norton and Sivert Samuelson (both SA), and Neville Tufnell (ENG) all made their Test debuts.

== The Reef v MCC ==
The tour included The Reef v MCC at Boksburg. It was scheduled as a four-day match but play only took place on two because of bad weather. Although the two teams consisted of recognised players, the South African Board of Control decided as late as 1930 that it had not been a first-class match. Wisden 1931 reproduced a letter from the SABC which outlined its case. Wisden has ignored the ruling and includes the match in the career figures of all the players who took part, including record-breaking players such as Wilfred Rhodes, Jack Hobbs and Frank Woolley.

It is possible that the SABC thought it was a two-day match, but Wisden 1911 clearly states that "not a ball could be bowled on the first and fourth days" so it was actually planned as a four-day match.

For more information about this curious affair, see: Variations in First-Class Cricket Statistics.

== Annual reviews ==
- Wisden Cricketers' Almanack 1911
