= Mailey =

Mailey is a surname. Notable people with the surname include:

- Arthur Mailey (1886–1967), Australian cricketer
- Laci J. Mailey (born 1990), Canadian actress
- Madison Mailey (born 1996), Canadian rower
- Willie Mailey (1943–1992), Scottish footballer

== See also ==
- Maile (disambiguation)
