= William Duff =

William Duff may refer to:

- William Duff, 1st Earl Fife (1696–1763), Scottish peer
- William Duff (cricketer) (1890–1953), South African soldier and cricketer
- William Duff (writer) (1732–1815), historically influential Scottish writer on genius and creativity
- William E. Duff, author
- William J. Duff (1856–1922), American football player
- William Duff (Canadian politician) (1872–1953), merchant and politician in Nova Scotia, Canada
- William Duff (Newfoundland politician) (1842–1913), Newfoundland merchant and politician
- William Duff (dentist) (born 1962), Scottish dentist
- Willie Duff (1935–2004), Scottish footballer
- William Duff (Arabist) (1922–2014) Scottish Arabist and banker, known to be one of the architects of modern Dubai
- Bill Duff (born 1974), NFL footballer
