= Louis Stricker =

South African cricketer (1884–1960)

- Stricker in 1912

Personal information
- Full name: Louis Anthony Stricker
- Born: 26 May 1884; Kimberley, Cape Colony
- Died: 5 February 1960 (aged 75); Rondebosch, Cape Town, South Africa
- Batting: Right-handed
- Bowling: Right-arm
- Relatives: Henry Stricker (brother)

International information
- National side: South Africa

Domestic team information
- Years: Team
- 1906-07 to 1911-12: Transvaal

Career statistics
Competition	Tests	First-class
Matches	13	60
Runs scored	342	2105
Batting average	14.25	22.88
100s/50s	0/0	2/9
Top score	48	146
Balls bowled	174	510
Wickets	1	8
Bowling average	105.00	37.87
5 wickets in innings	0	0
10 wickets in match	0	0
Best bowling	1/36	3/13
Catches/stumpings	3/-	29/2
- Source: Cricinfo, 4 February 2020

Louis Anthony Stricker (26 May 1884 – 5 February 1960) was a South African cricketer who played in 13 Tests from 1910 to 1912.

Of German parentage, Stricker was born in Beaconsfield, Kimberley. A few years later his family moved to Johannesburg, where he attended the Marist Brothers school.

A batsman, Stricker scored two centuries in first-class cricket: 103 for Transvaal against the touring English team in 1909–10 (when he shared an opening partnership of 215 with Billy Zulch), and 146 against South Australia when he toured Australia with the South Africans in 1910-11. He was less successful in Test cricket, with a top score of 48 in his 13 matches, scored twice: against Australia in Adelaide in 1910–11, when South Africa beat Australia for the first time, and against Australia at Lord's in the 1912 Triangular Tournament. His brother Henry was also a first-class cricketer.
