= Miley (disambiguation) =

Miley Cyrus (born 1992) is an American singer-songwriter and actress.

Miley may also refer to:

- Miley (given name)
- Miley (surname)

== See also ==
- Fort Miley Military Reservation
- Miley Memorial Field
- Maile (disambiguation)
