= William Brann =

William Brann may refer to:

- William Brann (cricketer) (1899–1953), South African cricketer
- William Cowper Brann (1855–1898), American journalist
- William L. Brann (c. 1877–1951), American businessman and Thoroughbred racehorse owner
