= Noël Constable =

South African politician

Member of the Western Cape Provincial Parliament
- In office 13 June 2024 – 5 March 2026

Personal details
- Party: Patriotic Alliance
- Other political affiliations: Karoo Democratic Force
- Profession: Politician

Noël Constable is a South African politician who served as a Member of the Western Cape Provincial Parliament from 2024 to 2026, representing the Patriotic Alliance. Constable was previously involved in the local politics of Beaufort West as the leader of the Karoo Democratic Force, a minor party in the Central Karoo.

== Political career ==
Constable was elected to the municipal council of the Beaufort West Local Municipality in the 2016 local government elections as the leader of the newly established Karoo Democratic Force. The party was considered the kingmaker in the 13-seat council, as the Democratic Alliance and ANC both won six seats, while it won one seat, which Constable filled. The party opted to form a coalition with the DA to govern Beaufort West, however, the coalition did not last as the KDF left it and opted to form a coalition with the ANC in 2018, which saw Constable elected as mayor of the municipality.

On 31 May 2021, Constable resigned as mayor of the municipality. He was voted in as speaker of the municipality's council during a council meeting on that same day which saw ANC councillor Quinton Louw succeed Constable as mayor.

On 17 September 2021, Constable along with Louw and two other suspects appeared in the Beaufort West magistrate's court on charges relating to tender fraud. Days after he was re-elected as council speaker in the aftermath of the November 2021 local government elections, he appeared in court again.

In the run-up to the 2024 national and provincial elections, Constable was one of five leaders of small parties in the Western Cape, who opted not to contest the elections and instead campaign for the Patriotic Alliance in a bid to push the DA below 50% in the Western Cape Provincial Parliament. The DA retained their majority in the provincial parliament during the elections and Constable was elected to the provincial parliament for the PA.

Constable resigned from the Provincial Parliament on 5 March 2026. The PA appointed Brendon Adams to fill his seat.
