= Peter Dodds =

Peter Dodds may refer to:

- Peter Dodds (cricketer) (1933–2022), South African cricketer
- Peter Dodds (mathematician), Australian-American mathematician
