= English cricket team in South Africa in 1922–23 =

International cricket tour

An England national cricket team, organised by Marylebone Cricket Club (MCC), toured South Africa from November 1922 to March 1923 and played a five-match Test series against the South Africa national cricket team. England won the Test series 2–1. South Africa were captained by Herbie Taylor and England by Frank Mann. The England team was well below full strength.

== Test series summary ==
=== First Test ===
23–28 December 1922
(4-day match)
Scorecard

| South Africa | v | England |
| 148 (55.4 overs); RH Catterall 39; AS Kennedy 4/37 (20.4 overs) | | 182 (56.5 overs); AS Kennedy 41*; JM Blanckenberg 6/76 (22.5 overs) |
| 420 (124.3 overs); HW Taylor 176; AS Kennedy 4/132 (41.3 overs) | | 218 (100 overs); CP Mead 49; EP Nupen 5/53 (30 overs) |

South Africa won by 168 runs
Old Wanderers, Johannesburg
Umpires: FW Grey (SA) and AG Laver (SA)

- South Africa won the toss and elected to bat.
- 24 and 25 December were taken as rest days.
- RH Catterall, GAL Hearne, WH Brann, CM Francois and ID Buys (all SA), and FT Mann, AW Carr, GTS Stevens, AS Kennedy and AER Gilligan (all ENG) made their Test debuts.

=== Second Test ===
1 – 4 January 1923
(4-day match)
Scorecard

| South Africa | v | England |
| 113 (56 overs); CM Francois 28; PGH Fender 4/29 (14 overs) | | 183 (68.1 overs); AW Carr 42; JM Blanckenberg 5/61 (24.1 overs) |
| 242 (114.2 overs); RH Catterall 76; GG Macaulay 5/64 (37 overs) | | 173/9 (88.3 overs); FT Mann 45; AE Hall 7/63 (37.3 overs) |

England won by 1 wicket
Newlands, Cape Town
Umpires: AG Laver (SA) and GJ Thompson (ENG)

- South Africa won the toss and elected to bat.
- AE Hall (SA), and GG Macaulay (ENG) made their Test debuts.

=== Third Test ===
18–22 January 1923
(4-day match)
Scorecard

| England | v | South Africa |
| 428 (185.5 overs); CP Mead 181; AE Hall 4/105 (53.5 overs) | | 368 (134.4 overs); HW Taylor 91; AS Kennedy 5/88 (39 overs) |
| 11/1 (4 overs); GB Street 7* AE Hall 1/2 (2 overs) |

Match drawn
Kingsmead, Durban
Umpires: GJ Thompson (ENG) and W Wainwright (ENG)

- England won the toss and elected to bat.
- 21 January was taken as a rest day.
- There was no play on the third day.
- GB Street (ENG) made his Test debut.
- WV Ling was summoned home to Kimberley where his mother was seriously ill. He was recorded as 'absent' in the South African innings - this was his final Test.

=== Fourth Test ===
9 – 13 February 1923
(4-day match)
Scorecard

| England | v | South Africa |
| 244 (103.4 overs); AW Carr 63; AE Hall 6/82 (36.4 overs) | | 295 (92 overs); TA Ward 65; VWC Jupp 3/36 (15 overs) |
| 376/6d (134 overs); FE Woolley 115*; DJ Meintjes 3/38 (11 overs) | | 247/4 (79.5 overs); HW Taylor 101; AS Kennedy 3/70 (27.5 overs) |

Match drawn
Old Wanderers, Johannesburg
Umpires: SL Harris (SA) and AG Laver (SA)

- England won the toss and elected to field.
- 11 February was taken as a rest day.
- DJ Meintjes and LE Tapscott (both SA) made their Test debuts.

=== Fifth Test ===
16 – 22 February 1923
(Timeless Test)
Scorecard

| England | v | South Africa |
| 281 (126.5 overs); CAG Russell 140; SJ Snooke 3/17 (12 overs) | | 179 (85 overs); AW Nourse 44; AER Gilligan 3/42 (23 overs) |
| 241 (130.4 overs); CAG Russell 111; JM Blanckenberg 3/50 (25.4 overs) | | 234 (117.1 overs); HW Taylor 102; AS Kennedy 5/76 (49.1 overs) |

England won by 109 runs
Kingsmead, Durban
Umpires: AG Laver (SA) and J Reid (SA)

- England won the toss and elected to bat.
- 18 February was taken as a rest day.
- DP Conyngham (SA) made his Test debut.
