= Sivert Samuelson =

South African cricketer (1883–1958)

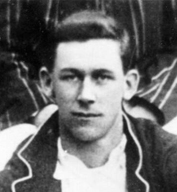

Personal information
- Full name: Sivert Vause Samuelson
- Born: 21 November 1883; York, near New Hanover, Colony of Natal
- Died: 18 November 1958 (aged 74); Durban, Natal, South Africa
- Batting: Right-handed
- Bowling: Right-arm off-spin

International information
- National side: South Africa
- Only Test (cap 72): 11 March 1910 v England

Career statistics
Competition	Tests	First-class
Matches	1	13
Runs scored	22	193
Batting average	11.00	12.06
100s/50s	0/0	0/0
Top score	15	39
Balls bowled	108	2128
Wickets	0	57
Bowling average	–	21.05
5 wickets in innings	–	7
10 wickets in match	–	2
Best bowling	–	8/40
Catches/stumpings	1/–	11/–
- Source: Cricinfo, 24 December 2017

Sivert Vause Samuelson (21 November 1883 – 18 November 1958) was a South African cricketer who played in one Test match in 1910.

Samuelson was an off-spin bowler and tail-end right-handed batsman for Natal who took five MCC wickets in an innings in his third first-class game and found himself in the Test team for the final match in the 1909–10 series, played at Newlands, Cape Town. He failed to take a wicket as England scored 417, with Jack Hobbs making 187. He batted at No 11 in both innings.

Samuelson played only one season of Currie Cup cricket for Natal, in 1910–11, taking 13 wickets in each of two matches and finishing with 41 wickets in the season at an average of less than 14 runs per wicket. But he then played only a couple more games the following season, and his only other first-class game was against MCC more than a decade later in 1922–23. His best bowling figures were 8 for 40 (followed by 5 for 107 in the second innings) in Natal's victory over Orange Free State in March 1911.

In the First World War, Samuelson served as a lieutenant with the 1st Cape Corps in German East Africa. He was awarded the Military Cross for his bravery in action at Mkungu in November 1917.
