= Izak Buys =

South African cricketer (1895–1946)

Personal information
- Full name: Isaac Daniel Buys
- Born: 4 February 1895; Somerset East, Cape Colony
- Died: October 9, 1946 (aged 51); Cape Town, Cape Province, South Africa
- Batting: Right-handed
- Bowling: Left-arm fast-medium

International information
- National side: South Africa
- Test debut: 23 December 1922 v England

Domestic team information
- Years: Team
- 1921/22–1923/24: Western Province

Career statistics
Competition	Test	FC
Matches	1	12
Runs scored	4	37
Batting average	4.00	3.70
100s/50s	0/0	0/0
Top score	4*	8
Balls bowled	144	2,340
Wickets	0	48
Bowling average	–	22.97
5 wickets in innings	–	3
10 wickets in match	–	0
Best bowling	–	6/49
Catches/stumpings	0/–	5/–
- Source: Cricinfo, 24 August 2017

Isaac Daniel "Izak" Buys (4 February 1895 – 9 October 1946) was a South African cricketer. A left-arm fast-medium bowler, Buys was born in Somerset East, Cape Colony.

Buys played first-class cricket for Western Province from 1921–22 to 1923–24, and also played one Test for South Africa, the First Test against England in 1922-23 at Johannesburg. He scored 0 and 4 not out and failed to take a wicket. A few weeks earlier he had taken 5 for 121 and 2 for 22 for Western Province against the tourists; all seven wickets were of noted batsmen. He also played for South Africa in the third match of the five-match series against S. B. Joel's XI in 1924-25, taking the first three wickets in the first innings. It was his last first-class match.

Buys' batting was poor – in 19 visits to the crease in his 12 first-class matches he never reached double figures – but he was an effective opening bowler. Three times he took five wickets in an innings, once per season from 1921–22 to 1923–24. His best figures were 6 for 49 at Johannesburg in a Currie Cup match against Border in December 1923, when he also took two catches in the first innings and 3 for 87 in the second innings.

Buys married Susanna Autef in Cape Town in January 1926; his occupation at the time was auctioneer's clerk. He died in the Groote Schuur Hospital, Cape Town, on 9 October 1946. He was a widower at the time, and the cause of his death is given as "haemorrhage duodenal ulcer" and chronic alcoholism. His body was donated to the medical school of the University of Cape Town, and was later interred at the Maitland Road Cemetery.

== Sources ==
- World Cricketers - A Biographical Dictionary by Christopher Martin-Jenkins, Oxford University Press (1996)
- The Wisden Book of Test Cricket, Volume 1 (1877-1977) compiled and edited by Bill Frindall, Headline Book Publishing (1995)

° https://familysearch.org/ark:/61903/3:1:33SQ-G5N4-9R3Z?i=3765&cc=1779109
