= Cyril Francois =

South African cricketer (1897–1944)

Personal information
- Full name: Cyril Matthew Francois
- Born: 20 June 1897; Lewisham, Kent, England
- Died: 26 May 1944 (aged 46); Pretoria, Transvaal, South Africa
- Batting: Right-handed
- Bowling: Right-arm fast-medium

International information
- National side: South Africa

Domestic team information
- Years: Team
- 1920–21 to 1927–28: Griqualand West

Career statistics
Competition	Test	FC
Matches	5	33
Runs scored	252	1232
Batting average	31.50	22.81
100s/50s	0/1	0/6
Top score	72	97
Balls bowled	684	5888
Wickets	6	101
Bowling average	37.50	28.44
5 wickets in innings	0	3
10 wickets in match	0	0
Best bowling	3/23	7/114
Catches/stumpings	5/–	24/–
- Source: Cricinfo, 24 March 2026

Cyril Matthew Francois (20 June 1897 – 26 May 1944) was a South African cricketer who played in five Tests in 1922–23. Francois represented Griqualand West in domestic cricket. He began his first-class cricket career as a right-arm fast-medium bowler and lower-order batsman but later became a middle-order batsman and support bowler.

== Cricket career ==
Francois made his first-class debut for Griqualand West in the 1920–21 Currie Cup. In his third match, he took 6 for 63 in the first innings against Orange Free State; at this stage of his career he was batting at no. 10. In the Currie Cup match against Orange Free State in 1921-22 he took 6 for 59 in the first innings; he was still batting at no. 10. In 1922–23, when England toured, he took 7 for 114 when Griqualand West played the MCC early in the tour, and was selected to play in the Test matches.

Francois took four wickets and made 19 and 9 batting low in the order in the First Test, which South Africa won. His bowling yielded only two more wickets in the next four Tests, but he was one of South Africa's more successful batsmen, finishing the series with 252 runs at an average of 31.50, with a top score of 72 in the Third Test, when he batted at no. 6.

Francois played less often after 1922–23, although he played for South Africa in one of the unofficial Tests against S. B. Joel's team in 1924–25. He made his highest first-class score in his last match, against Orange Free State in 1927–28, scoring 97 and 54.

== Personal life ==
Francois was born in England in 1897. His family moved shortly afterwards to South Africa, where his younger brothers Stanley and Hugh, who both played first-class cricket in South Africa, were born in 1899 and 1904 respectively.

Francois married Constance Minnie Perkins in Kimberley in November 1928. At the time he was working as a clerk for South African Railways. He died in a motor accident near Pretoria in 1944 while serving in the South African Air Force as an air sergeant.
