= Lewis Newnham =

South African cricketer (1881–1932)

Personal information
- Full name: Lewis Cyril Ashby Newnham
- Born: 13 September 1881; Jansenville, Cape Colony
- Died: 20 November 1932 (aged 51); Pretoria, South Africa

Domestic team information
- Years: Team
- 1903/04: Border
- 1920/21: Transvaal

Career statistics
Competition	First-class
Matches	2
Runs scored	12
Batting average	4.00
100s/50s	0/0
Top score	9
Balls bowled	270
Wickets	5
Bowling average	12.80
5 wickets in innings	0
10 wickets in match	0
Best bowling	3/14
Catches/stumpings	0/0
- Source: Cricinfo, 12 December 2020

Lewis Cyril Ashby Newnham (13 September 1881 – 20 November 1932) was a South African cricketer. He played in two first-class matches in 1903/04 and 1920/21.

Newnham was a left-handed batsman and left-arm bowler. In his second first-class match, 17 years after his first, he took 3 for 14 off 9 overs in the second innings to help Transvaal to an innings victory over Orange Free State in the 1920–21 Currie Cup. At the age of 43 he scored 58, the highest score on either side in the two-day match, for a Pretoria side against S. B. Joel's XI, a team consisting largely of English Test cricketers, in November 1924.

Newnham was educated at Cranleigh School in England. He served as an officer in the Cape Corps in World War I. He married Constance Vera Lofthouse in Pretoria in March 1910; they had several children.
