= Du Toit's Pan =

Mine in Northern Cape, South Africa

Coordinates: 28°45′32″S 24°46′52″E

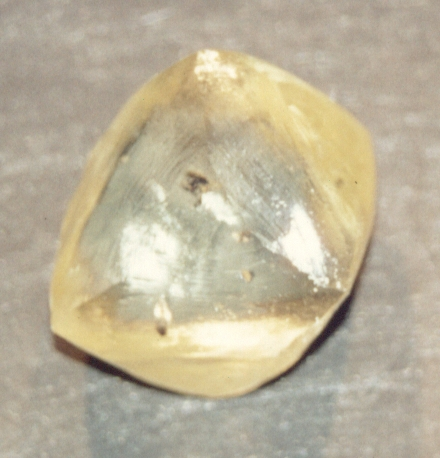
The Oppenheimer Diamond, discovered in 1964 at the Dutoitspan Mine

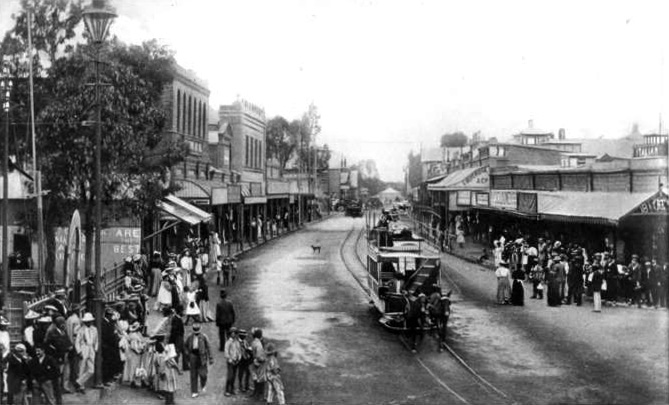
Dutoitspan Road in 1905

Du Toit's Pan, now usually Dutoitspan, is one of the earliest diamond mining camps at what is now Kimberley, South Africa. It was renamed Beaconsfield, which existed as a separate borough from Kimberley itself until Kimberley and Beaconsfield were amalgamated as the City of Kimberley in 1912.

An early map drawn by George Paton on the eve of the discovery of diamonds mentions 'Teuzpan' which, when pronounced in the German way, sounds the way local Dutch/Afrikaans-speaking farmers would have pronounced (Du) Toit's Pan.

The name refers also to one of the major mines in Kimberley, the Dutoitspan mine. It also applies to the main road extending southwards from the central business district of Kimberley, i.e. towards Beaconsfield.
