= Edward Bartley (cricketer) =

English cricketer

Personal information
- Full name: Edward Leslie Dayrell Bartley
- Born: 2 March 1896; Stockport, Cheshire, England
- Died: 7 October 1969 (aged 73); Stonehouse, Devon, England
- Batting: Left-handed
- Role: Wicket-keeper

Domestic team information
- Years: Team
- 1931: Hampshire

Career statistics
Competition	First-class
Matches	27
Runs scored	649
Batting average	20.28
100s/50s	0/4
Top score	84
Catches/stumpings	43/19
- Source: Cricinfo, 10 January 2010

Edward Leslie Dayrell Bartley (2 March 1896 – 7 October 1969) was an English first-class cricketer and Royal Navy officer.

The son of a soldier, Edward Beckles Bartley, he was born at Stockport in March 1896. Bartley was commissioned into the Royal Navy as a sub-lieutenant in 1913. The following year, he made his debut in first-class cricket for the Royal Navy against the British Army cricket team at Lord's. He served in the initial stages of the First World War aboard HMS Hibernia, doing so until 1915. He then served aboard HMS TB 9 and HMS Jackal, before being transferred to the nascent Royal Air Force (RAF) in March 1917; with this transfer, his rank changed to flight sub-lieutenant. He was promoted to lieutenant in November 1917, and later relinquished his commission in the RAF shortly after Armistice Day and returned to the Royal Navy.

Following the war, Bartley returned to first-class cricket for the Royal Navy, making four appearances in the Royal Navy v British Army fixture from 1919 to 1924. In 1924, he played for the Combined Services cricket team against the touring South Africans at Portsmouth. In the winter of 1924, he toured South Africa with Solomon Joel's personal team, making twelve first-class appearances against various South African teams. During the tour, he scored 117 runs at an average of 10.63; as wicket-keeper, he took 24 catches and made eight catches. Following a further appearance in the Royal Navy v British Army fixture in 1925, Bartley was promoted to lieutenant commander in November 1925. He continued to play first-class cricket for the Royal Navy until 1927, including playing against the touring New Zealanders. In ten first-class matches for the Royal Navy, Bartley scored 459 runs at an average of exactly 27, with a highest score of 84; this was one of four half centuries he made. As wicket-keeper, he took nine catches and made eight stumpings.

Bartley made three first-class appearances for Hampshire in 1931, playing against the touring New Zealanders, in addition to playing in the County Championship against Gloucestershire and Glamorgan. His appearances for Hampshire coincided with the unexpected retirement of wicket-keeper Walter Livsey and came just prior to the emergence of Neil McCorkell; he shared the Hampshire wicket-keeping duties in 1931 with George Brown and Stephen Fry. He made a final first-class appearance later in 1931, for the Combined Services against the New Zealanders. In 27 first-class matches, Bartley took 43 catches and made 19 stumpings. He continued to serve in the Royal Navy up to the Second World War, retiring during the conflict in March 1941, at which point he was granted the rank of commander. Bartley died at the Royal Naval Hospital at Stonehouse in Plymouth on 7 October 1969.
