= Henry Stricker =

South African cricketer and South African Army soldier

Personal information
- Full name: Henry Bernard Stricker
- Born: 1888; Beaconsfield, Cape Colony
- Died: 15 February 1917 (aged 29); Dodoma, German East Africa
- Batting: Right-handed
- Bowling: Unknown
- Relatives: Louis Stricker (brother)

Domestic team information
- Years: Team
- 1912/13–1913/14: Transvaal

Career statistics
Competition	First-class
Matches	3
Runs scored	70
Batting average	23.33
100s/50s	0/1
Top score	66*
Balls bowled	198
Wickets	2
Bowling average	80.50
5 wickets in innings	0
10 wickets in match	0
Best bowling	1/23
Catches/stumpings	3/–
- Source: Cricinfo, 9 June 2022

Henry Bernard Stricker (1888 – 15 February 1917) was a South African first-class cricketer and South African Army soldier.

Stricker was born at Beaconsfield, Kimberley, in 1888 to Louis Stricker senior and his wife, Maude. He was educated at Sacred Heart College, Johannesburg.

Stricker was selected to play for Transvaal in March 1913, making his first-class debut against Griqualand West, scoring an unbeaten 66. He made two further first-class appearances in January 1914 for Transvaal against the touring Marylebone Cricket Club. In his three first-class matches, he scored 70 runs at an average of 23.33. With the ball he took two wickets, with best figures of 1 for 23.

Stricker served in the South African Army during the First World War, where he was a conductor in the South African Service Corps (Animal Transport). He died from blackwater fever in February 1917 at Dodoma in German East Africa, aged 29. His brother was the Test cricketer Louis Stricker.
