= Oppenheimer Diamond =

Large diamond

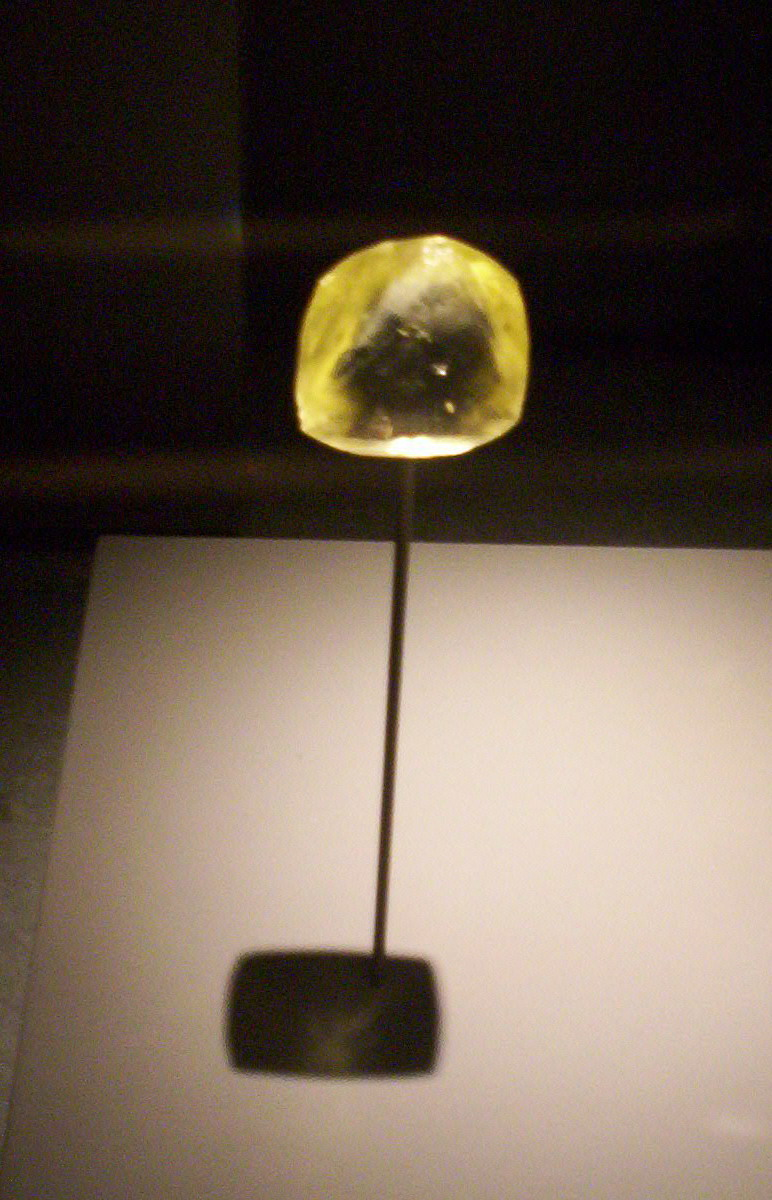
- Oppenheimer Diamond displayed in the Smithsonian Institution
- Type of stone: diamond
- Weight: 253.7 carats (50.74 g)
- Dimensions: 20 mm × 20 mm (0.79 in × 0.79 in)
- Color: yellow
- Cut: (uncut)
- Country of origin: South Africa
- Mine of origin: Dutoitspan Mine
- Discovered: 1964

The Oppenheimer Diamond, a nearly perfectly formed 253.7 carats (50.74 g) yellow diamond crystal, is one of the largest uncut diamonds in the world, and measures approximately 20 mm × 20 mm (0.79 in × 0.79 in). It was discovered in the Dutoitspan Mine, Kimberley, South Africa (1948–1994), in 1964. Harry Winston acquired the stone and presented it to the Smithsonian Institution in memory of Sir Ernest Oppenheimer.

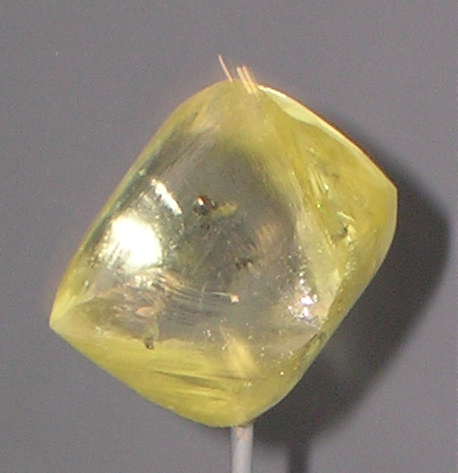
Oppenheimer Diamond

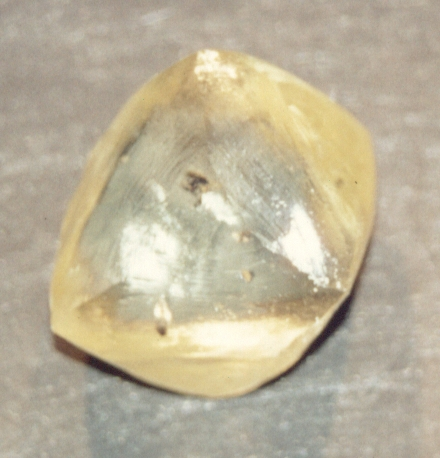

== See also ==
- List of diamonds
