= Alfred Atfield =

Personal information
- Full name: Alfred John Atfield
- Born: 3 March 1868; Ightham, Kent, England
- Died: 1 January 1949 (aged 80); Caterham, Surrey, England
- Batting: Right-handed
- Bowling: Right-arm medium
- Role: Batsman

Domestic team information
- Years: Team
- 1893: Gloucestershire
- 1897–1899: Wiltshire
- 1897/98: Natal
- 1900: London County
- 1901: MCC
- 1906/07: Transvaal
- FC debut: 29 May 1893 Gloucestershire v Middlesex
- Last FC: 28 March 1907 Transvaal v Border

Umpiring information
- Tests umpired: 8 (1909/10–1913/14)

Career statistics
Competition	First-class
Matches	8
Runs scored	137
Batting average	12.45
100s/50s	0/0
Top score	45
Balls bowled	168
Wickets	3
Bowling average	34.00
5 wickets in innings	0
10 wickets in match	0
Best bowling	3/102
Catches/stumpings	5/–
- Source: CricketArchive, 23 August 2012

Alfred John Atfield (3 March 1868 – 1 January 1949) played first-class cricket in England and South Africa and was also a Test match umpire and an influential cricket coach. He was born at Ightham, Kent, England and died at Caterham, Surrey.

A right-handed lower-order batsman and a right-arm medium-pace bowler, Atfield played for Kent County Cricket Club's second eleven before qualifying for Gloucestershire, for whom he played three first-class matches in 1893. Those were the only competitive first-class games of his career and in the third of them, batting tenth in the order against Kent, Atfield scored 45, which was his highest first-class score. He was then recruited to play as a professional by the mill-owning cricket patron W. H. Laverton, who ran his own country-house cricket team at Leighton House, Westbury in Wiltshire. Over the next few years, Atfield played in many non-first-class games alongside some of the leading amateur players of the time: Laverton himself was the father-in-law of Lionel Palairet, for example, who was often included in Laverton's teams. While employed by Laverton, he also played regularly in Minor Counties cricket for Wiltshire in the early seasons of the Minor Counties Championship.

From 1897 onwards, Atfield divided his time between playing, coaching and umpiring commitments in England and South Africa. In the 1897–98 South African cricket season, he was a professional in Durban club cricket and played a single first-class match for Natal in that season. By 1900, he was back in England playing for W. G. Grace's London County team and the following year he became a professional for the Marylebone Cricket Club at Lord's, appearing in a couple of first-class matches in the 1901 season. In the second of these games, for MCC against London County, Atfield took his only first-class wickets; his first victim as a bowler was Grace.

Atfield began umpiring first-class matches with MCC from 1902 and by 1905 he had graduated to umpiring in County Championship matches in the English first-class season, remaining on the first-class umpires list in England until 1924 and thereafter standing in occasional matches through to 1932. He continued to spend his winters in South Africa, and in 1906–07, in a series of three matches between Transvaal and Border he umpired two games and played for Transvaal in the third: his final first-class appearance as a player.

Most of Atfield's time in South Africa was spent as a coach and he was credited as an influence in the development of Bob Catterall at Jeppe High School for Boys in Johannesburg. He umpired only occasional first-class matches in South Africa, but was called on as an umpire for four Tests on each of two successive tours of South Africa by England teams – the 1909–10 tour and the 1913–14 tour. He acted as umpire in England in Gentlemen v Players matches and in a Test trial match in 1927, but was not picked to umpire any Tests in England.
