= Charles Handfield =

Australian-born South African cricketer

Personal information
- Full name: Charles Reginald Handfield
- Born: 26 August 1878; South Yarra, Victoria, Australia
- Died: 6 May 1915 (aged 36); Gibeon, German West Africa

Domestic team information
- Years: Team
- 1909: Transvaal

Career statistics
Competition	First-class
Matches	1
Runs scored	5
Batting average	5.00
100s/50s	–/–
Top score	5
Balls bowled	–
Wickets	–
Bowling average	–
5 wickets in innings	–
10 wickets in match	–
Best bowling	–
Catches/stumpings	2/0
- Source: Cricinfo, 1 August 2020

Charles Reginald Handfield (26 August 1878 – 6 May 1915) was an Australian-born South African first-class cricketer and soldier.

Handfield was born in South Yarra in August 1878 and was educated at Malvern Grammar School, where he was the captain of the cricket and football teams. After graduating in 1901, he and his brother George emigrated to South Africa, where he joined the 1st Imperial Light Horse on the outbreak of the Second Boer War. He served in the Orange Free State and Transvaal and was promoted to corporal in 1902.

Handfield appeared in one first-class Currie Cup cricket match for Transvaal against Border on 23 March 1909. During the match, which took place at the Newlands Rugby Ground, Handfield caught Charles Johnson and Norman Norton and scored 5 runs before being bowled by Arthur Sprenger.

At the outbreak of the First World War in August 1914, Handfield enlisted in the Natal Light Horse, once again with the rank of corporal. The regiment was engaged in the South West Africa campaign, in which they were pushing German forces into German West Africa. Handfield was wounded in action during a battle at Gibeon on 27 April 1915 and died of his wounds on 7 May. He is buried at the Gibeon Station Cemetery.
