= Dalton Conyngham =

South African cricketer (1897–1979)

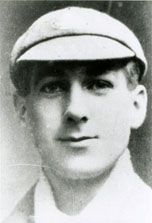

Personal information
- Full name: Dalton Parry Conyngham
- Born: 10 May 1897; Durban, Natal Colony
- Died: 7 July 1979 (aged 82); Durban, South Africa
- Nickname: Conky
- Batting: Right-handed
- Bowling: Right-arm medium

International information
- National side: South Africa

Domestic team information
- Years: Team
- 1921–22 to 1924–25: Natal
- 1926–27 to 1927–28: Transvaal
- 1930–31: Western Province

Career statistics
Competition	Tests	First-class
Matches	1	22
Runs scored	6	348
Batting average	–	15.13
100s/50s	0/0	0/2
Top score	3*	63
Balls bowled	366	4677
Wickets	2	86
Bowling average	51.50	20.67
5 wickets in innings	0	6
10 wickets in match	0	1
Best bowling	1/40	5/20
Catches/stumpings	1/–	18/–
- Source: Cricinfo, 2 January 2018

Dalton Parry "Conky" Conyngham (10 May 1897 – 7 July 1979) was a South African cricketer who played in one Test match in the 1922–23 season. He played first-class cricket in South Africa from 1921–22 to 1930–31.

== Early life ==
Conyngham was born in Durban, Natal, where he attended Durban High School. He sailed to England and joined the Royal Flying Corps in World War I, but was still in training when the war ended.

== Cricket career ==
A right-arm medium-pace bowler, Conyngham took 40 wickets in six matches for the successful Natal side in 1921–22, including his best figures of 5 for 20 against Griqualand West. However, he then played only spasmodically over the next few seasons, dropping out of the side after 1924–25. He played a few matches from 1926 for Transvaal, one of them in Rhodesia where he made his highest first-class score, and had two further games for Western Province in 1930–31.

In his one Test in the final match of the 1922–23 series against the England team under Frank Mann, Conyngham scored an unbeaten 3 in each innings and took one wicket in each England innings.

Conyngham also played for South Africa in two of the matches against S. B. Joel's XI in 1924–25 but without success. In the two matches Natal played against S. B. Joel's XI earlier in the tour he had taken five wickets in an innings three times, with match figures of 10 for 150 in the second match.

== Later life and death ==
Conyngham worked as a civil servant. He married Constance Jennings in George in August 1930. He died in Durban in July 1979, aged 82.
