= Miley (surname) =

Miley is an English, Irish, and American family name. In America, it is a family name of predominantly Irish origin, although some claim German origin that was originally spelled Meiley.

Notable people with the surname include:

- Arthur Miley (born 1993), American football player
- Dave Miley (born 1962), American baseball player and manager
- George H. Miley (born 1933), American physicist
- George K. Miley (born 1942), Irish-Dutch astronomer
- Hannah Miley (born 1989), Scottish swimmer
- Henry A. Miley, Jr. (1915–2010), US Army four-star general
- James "Bubber" Miley (1903–1932), American jazz musician
- Jamie Miley (born 2004), English footballer and brother of Lewis Miley
- Jessi Miley-Dyer (born 1986), Australian surfer
- John Miley (1813–1895), American Methodist theologian
- Lewis Miley (born 2006), English footballer and brother of Jamie Miley
- Mark Miley, Irish Gaelic football and hurling player
- Michael Miley (born 1974), American drummer for the Rival Sons
- Mike Miley (1953–1973), American baseball player
- Peggy Miley (born 1941), American actress
- Tim Miley (born 1966), American politician, attorney, and author from West Virginia
- Wade Miley (born 1986), American baseball player
- William M. Miley (1897–1997), US Army officer

== See also ==
- Milley
- Miley (given name)
