= Vivian Neser =

South African cricketer, lawyer, and judge

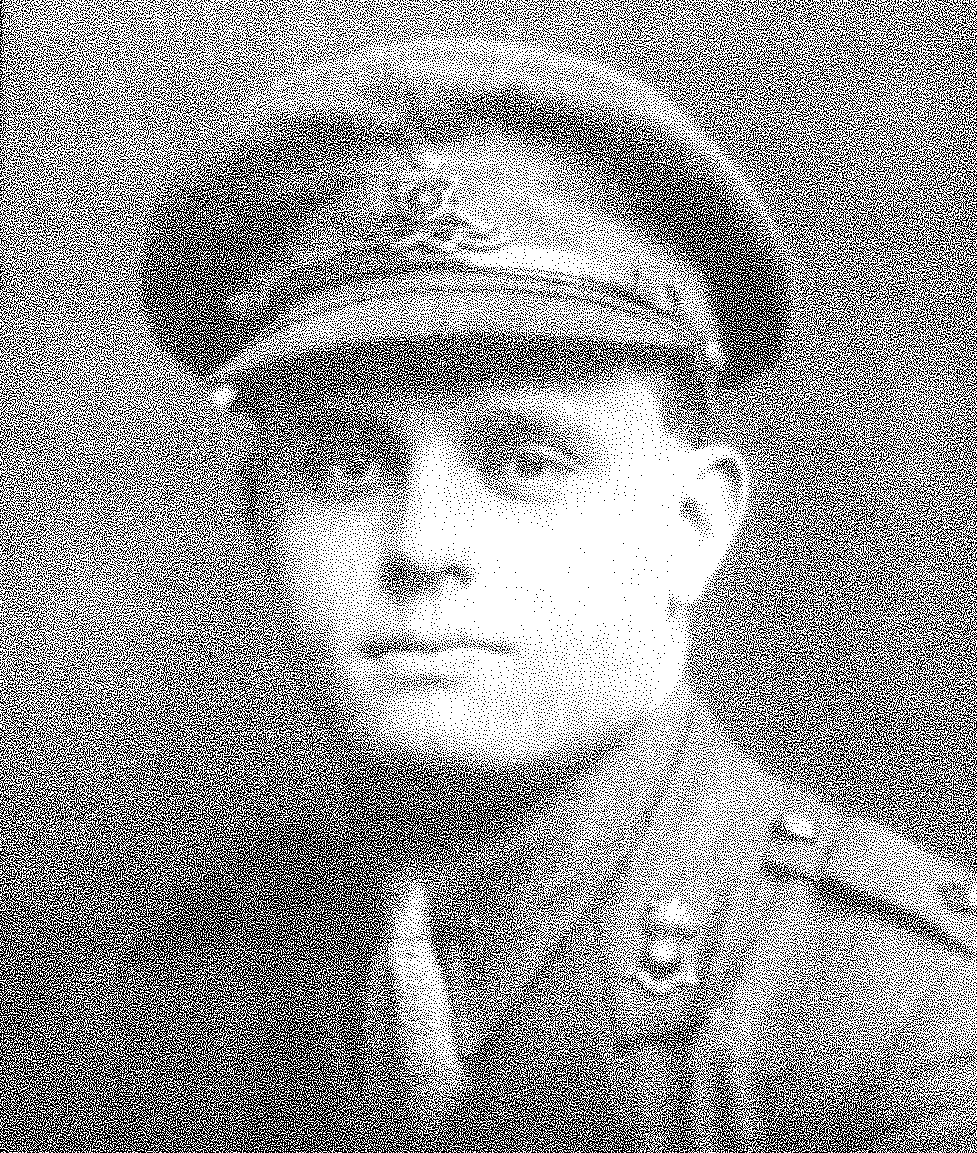
- Neser in World War I

Personal information
- Full name: Vivian Herbert Neser
- Born: 16 June 1894; Klerksdorp, South African Republic
- Died: 22 December 1956 (aged 62); Pretoria, Transvaal, South Africa
- Nickname: Boet, Knoppie
- Batting: Right-handed
- Role: Wicketkeeper-batsman

Domestic team information
- Years: Team
- 1919 to 1921: Oxford University
- 1921–22 to 1924–25: Transvaal

Career statistics
Competition	First-class
Matches	18
Runs scored	743
Batting average	27.51
100s/50s	0/7
Top score	90
Catches/stumpings	28/15
- Source: Cricinfo, 7 July 2017

Vivian Herbert "Boet" Neser MC (16 June 1894 – 22 December 1956) was a South African cricketer and lawyer who became a judge.

== Life and career ==
Neser was educated at Potchefstroom High School for Boys and South African College, Cape Town. He served as an officer with the Royal Field Artillery in World War I and was awarded the Military Cross. After the war he went to Brasenose College, Oxford, as a Rhodes Scholar. He was awarded a Blue in cricket and Rugby. His highest score for Oxford University was 72 when the university beat Sussex in 1921. He graduated with a BA (Hons.) and BCL.

Neser returned to South Africa in 1921 to practise law in Pretoria. He also played cricket as a wicketkeeper-batsman for Transvaal, scoring 90 in his first match, a victory over Natal in the Currie Cup in 1921–22. He captained the South African team in all five matches against S. B. Joel's XI in 1924–25, then retired from first-class cricket. The series was tied 2–2, with one match drawn. In the first match, Neser made 80, the highest score of the match, in South Africa's first innings, and led his team to victory. South Africa were also successful in the final match, which was Neser's last first-class match.

Neser refereed nine Rugby internationals in South Africa in the 1920s and 1930s, including all four matches between the Springboks and the All Blacks in 1928. He wrote a book on refereeing, Refereeing and Comments on the Laws of Rugby, in 1933. He served as president of the Harlequins Rugby Club in Pretoria.

Neser became an acting judge of the Transvaal Provincial Division of the South African Supreme Court, and was raised permanently to the Bench in 1944.
