= Sacred Heart College, Johannesburg =

Sacred Heart College, Marist Observatory
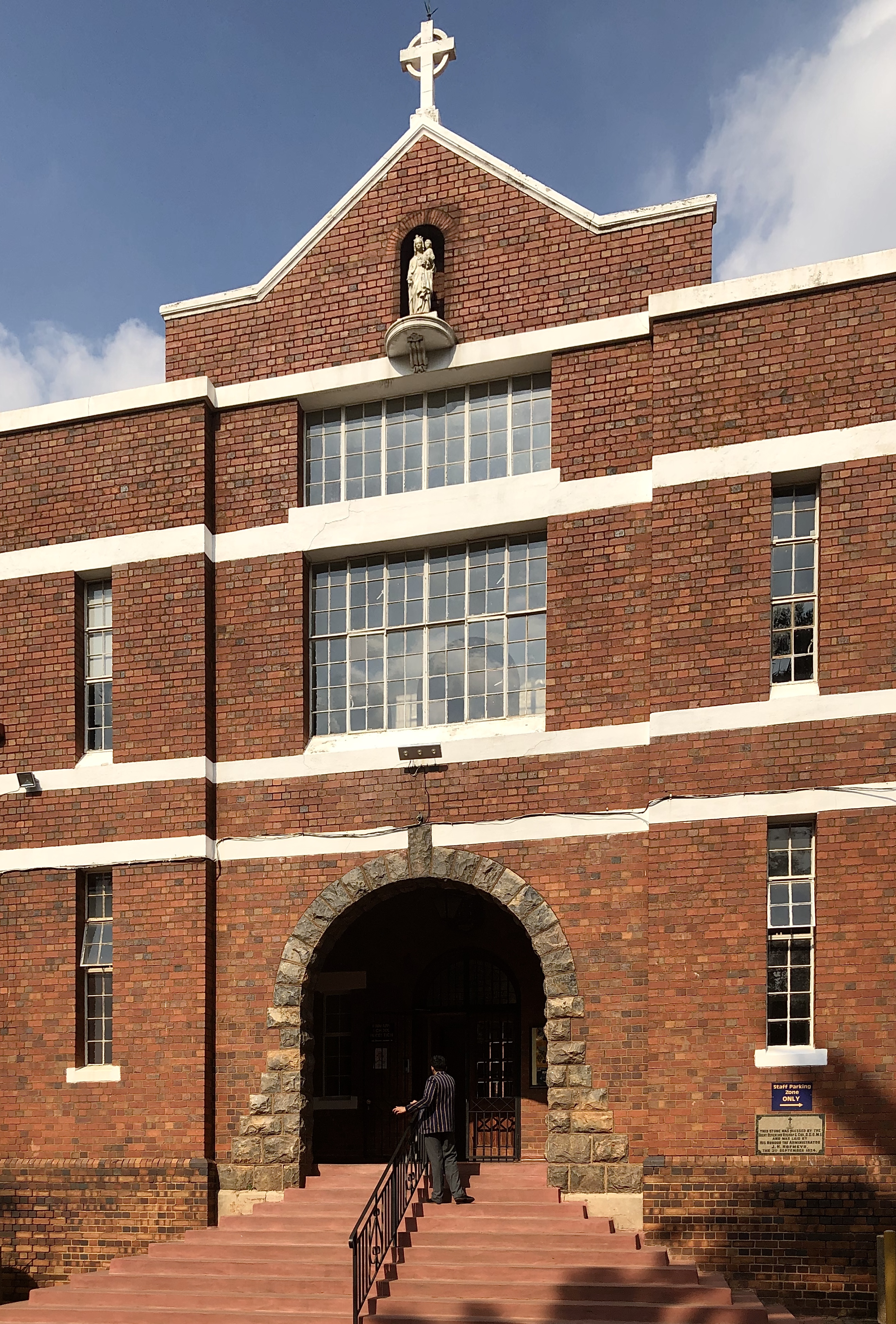
- Above: Sacred Heart College Main Entrance
- Observatory; Johannesburg, Gauteng; South Africa

Information
- Type: Independent, Private, Co-Ed
- Motto: In Meliora Contende (Strive for Better Things)
- Established: 1889; 137 years ago
- Head of College & High School: Mr Dhiraj Bharuth
- Grades: Creche - 12
- Enrollment: 550 pupils
- Houses: Benedict, Geddes, O'Leary, Valerian
- Colours: Navy; Gold; Blue; White
- Mascot: Dolphin
- Affiliation: IEB, ISASA, Catholic Board of Education, Catholic Institute of Education
- Website: https://sacredheart.co.za/

Sacred Heart College, Marist Observatory is a private Catholic school in Observatory, Johannesburg founded in 1889 by the Marist Brothers. The college was originally established as the first Catholic school for boys in Johannesburg. It now accepts girls and boys through creche, pre-primary school, primary school and high school. It is distinguished among independent schools for its contribution to fostering an inclusive society in Apartheid-Era South Africa. The college runs an IEB examination course and is affiliated with the Independent Schools Association of Southern Africa.

== History ==
The Marist Brothers movement started in France. In 1817, a priest, Marcellin Champagnat, started and ran a primary school in the village of La Valla, France. Supported by seven brothers, Champagnat educated children in the fundamentals of reading, writing, and Christian teaching.

In 1889, Sacred Heart College was founded by three Marist brothers, who arrived in Johannesburg upon the Gold Rush in the neighbouring Witwatersrand. The first school for boys was established in Koch Street, where in 2 years enrollment had increased to 300 students.

In 1924, additional grounds were later constructed in Observatory as a result of the school's rapid expansion.

The Marist Brothers College high-school (as it was then called) opened in 1926. Eventually, the school grew, requiring a second primary school building in the Orchards of the Observatory location.

As many Jewish children attended the school in the 1950s, the college organised for a Rabbi to give lessons every Friday. By this time many Chinese students were also being admitted to the school, despite the growing racial tensions in the country at the time.

The Koch street premises had become overgrown with commercial properties during the 60s. As a result, it was closed down. During this transitionary period the school was headed by Br. Neil McGurk. His vision for education in South Africa ultimately led the college to ignore government order and open its doors to boys of all races.

In the 1980s, the school name reverted to Sacred Heart College. Along with this change came the introduction of girls in 1979 as a result of the amalgamation between Yeoville Holy Family Convent and St Angela's Ursuline School. In two years, the college transformed from an all-boys, all-white school to a multi-racial, co-educational institution.

== Academics ==
The college has maintained a 100% pass rate in the national IEB examinations for the past 20 years and a 98% Bachelor's degree pass. Students continue to study and complete degrees of choice.

== Houses ==
Students at the college compete with one another in their respective houses. The four main houses are:

- Benedict (green), named after the school's founder St. Marcellin Benedict Champagnat
- Geddes (blue), named after Br. Joe Geddes
- O'Leary (yellow), named after Bishop David O'Leary
- Valerian (red), named after Br. Valerian (a former principal of the school and beloved teacher)

== Uniform ==
=== School blazer ===
The Sacred Heart blazer is an important element of the school's history, culture and image. Its design is the standard for Marist schools in South Africa.

=== Colours blazer ===
The highest honour of distinction the college can offer to a student is a full-colour blazer. Its current design is that of a navy-blue college blazer with optional white braiding. This is awarded to students who have met specific criteria in several disciplines e.g. academics, sports, the performing arts, music, cultural activities (chess) etc.

== Student leadership ==
Sacred Heart College has maintained an active student representative council since 1989 – when the previous prefect system was replaced by a less authoritative and more representative leadership structure. Today the college's Learner Leadership Council (LLC) consists of matric students who are active members of the school and the greater community at large. In addition, the High School has confirmed with the SRC structure, which works with the LLC to give students an active role in school life. The Primary School also has leadership opportunities for grade 6s.

== Sporting ==
As of 2025, the following sporting codes are offered at Sacred Heart College:

=== Term 1 ===
- Basketball
- Swimming
- Cricket

=== Term 2 ===
- Soccer
- Netball
- Athletics

=== Term 3 ===
- Basketball
- Athletics
- Cricket
- Swimming

== Cultural programs ==
The school's extensive cultural program as of 2020 is as follows: Dance, Art, Chess, Choir, Coding, Gaming, Game Design, Mad Youth, Debating, Enviro-Club, Photography, First Aid, Marimbas, Marketing Club, Mosaic, Mandarin, Yoga, and Tai Chi.

== Three-2-six project ==
Founded in 2008 by former Head of College Colin Northmore, the Three-2-six project is an educational initiative that provides refugee and asylum-seeking children with a hot meal and 3 hours of education daily.

The project has grown to include support from other schools in the surrounding Johannesburg East area.

It currently caters for more than 300 children.

== Facilities ==
The college is equipped with the following facilities:

- Chapel
- Prayer room
- Hall
- 2 libraries
- 2 AV rooms
- 3 computer labs
- Design and technology centre
- Music centre
- 2 tuck-shops
- 5 soccer fields
- 4 netball courts
- 6 tennis courts
- Heated swimming pool
- 3 cricket ovals
- 2 outside basketball courts
- 6 cricket nets
- Indoor sports centre
- Fully equipped gymnasium

== Notable alumni ==
- John Charles Daly, radio and television personality
- Hlomla Dandala, actor
- Lord Joffe OBE, lawyer, Labour Peer of the House of Lords
- Samuel Kinkead DSO DSC, WW1 fighter ace
- Phindiwe Sangweni, Attorney & businesswoman. First black & first female director of the Constitutional Court of South Africa
- Henry Stricker, cricketer
