= Miley (given name) =

Unisex given name

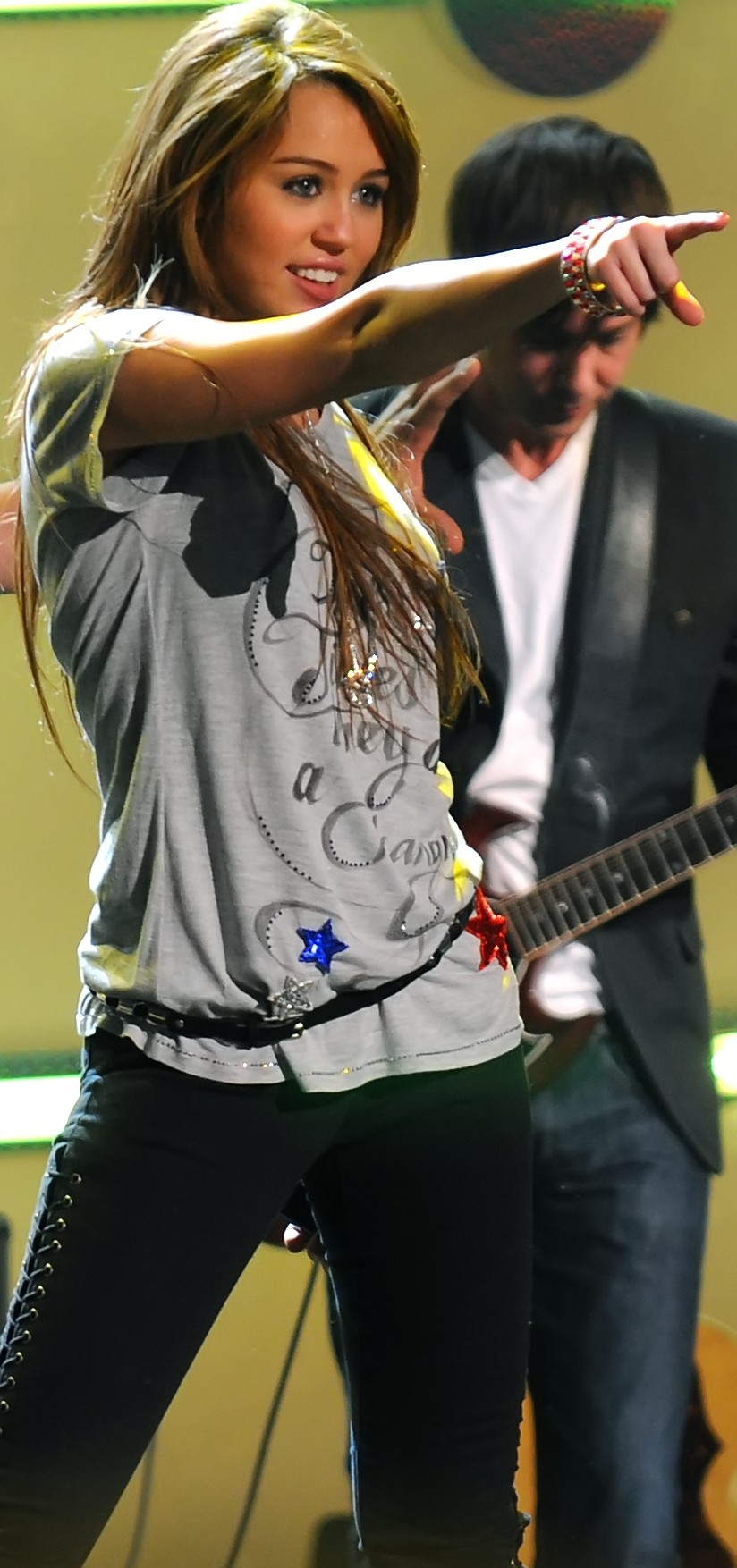
- The name Miley first appeared on popularity charts following the rise to fame of singer-songwriter and actress Miley Cyrus
- Pronunciation: /maɪli/ MY-lee
- Gender: Unisex

Other names
- Related names: Maile, Milee, Mileigh, Mylee, Myleigh, Mylie

Miley is a unisex English given name. It first entered the top 1,000 names used for newborn girls in the United States in 2007 and has continued to be well used. Spelling variants of the name in use include, among others, Milee, Mileigh, Mylee, Myleigh, and Mylie. Its popularity is attributed to the fame of singer-songwriter and actress Miley Cyrus (born Destiny Hope Cyrus), whose name originated as a childhood nickname given to her by her father because she was so "smiley". Cyrus starred as Miley Stewart on the Disney Channel sitcom Hannah Montana.

The popularity of the name also coincided with similar sounding names that also became fashionable for girls in the English-speaking world in the late 20th and early 21st centuries such as Kylie and Riley. The name continues to rank among the top 1,000 names given to newborn American girls and usage has continued to increase.

Miley was also used as a masculine given name for a character named Miley Byrne played by Mick Lally in the Irish drama series Glenroe.

== Women ==
- Miley Cyrus (born 1992), American singer-songwriter and actress

== Men ==
- Miley Miers (1927–2010), American politician

== See also ==
- Maile (disambiguation)
