= Harry Smith (cricketer, born 1884) =

South African cricketer

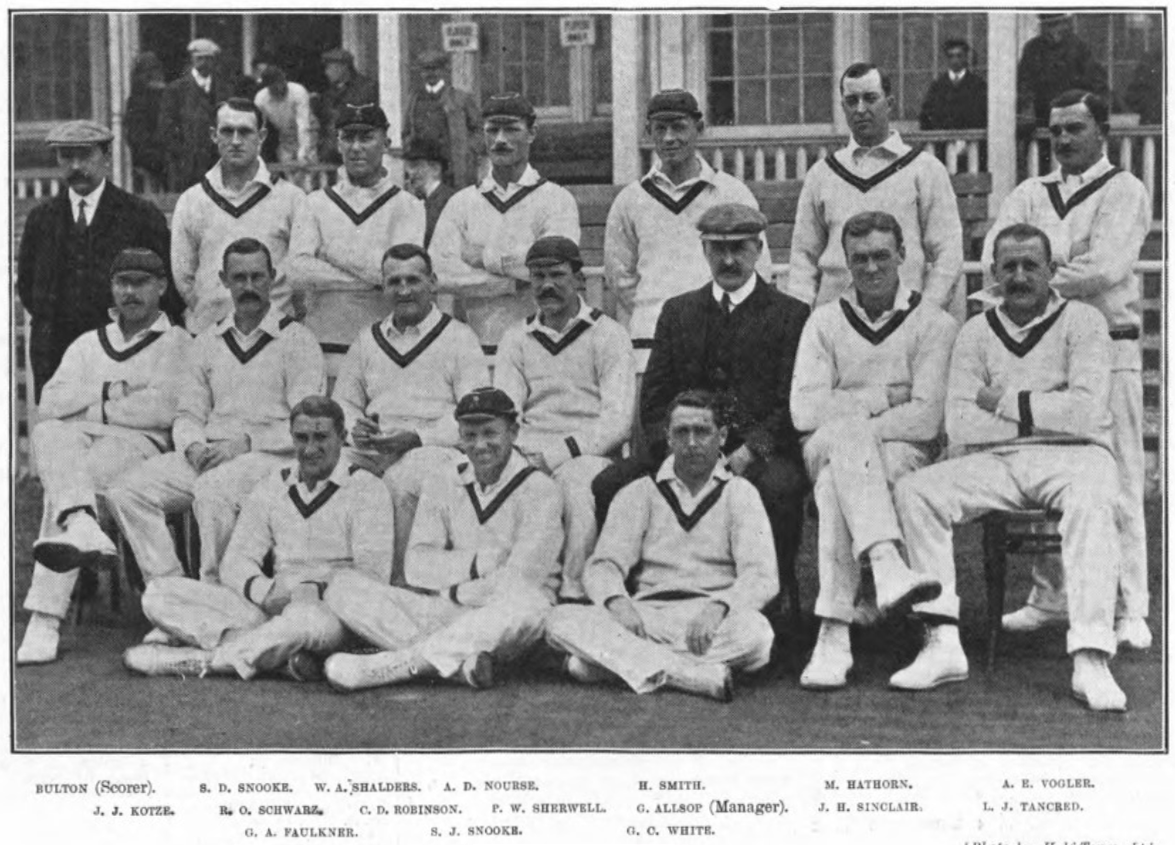
- The South African team in England in 1907. Smith is standing, third from the right.

Personal information
- Full name: Harry Ernest Smith
- Born: 21 April 1884; Cradock, Cape Colony
- Died: 25 April 1935 (aged 51); Boksburg, Transvaal, South Africa
- Batting: Right-handed
- Relatives: Charlie Smith (half-brother)

Domestic team information
- Years: Team
- 1905-06 to 1906-07: Transvaal

Career statistics
Competition	First-class
Matches	15
Runs scored	395
Batting average	18.80
100s/50s	0/1
Top score	53
Balls bowled	0
Wickets	–
Bowling average	–
5 wickets in innings	–
10 wickets in match	–
Best bowling	–
Catches/stumpings	2/0
- Source: CricketArchive, 14 February 2017

Harry Ernest Smith (21 April 1884 – 25 April 1935) was a cricketer who played first-class cricket in South Africa from 1905 to 1908. He toured England with the South Africans in 1907 but did not play Test cricket.

== Personal life ==
Harry Smith's father, James, had two sons with his first wife. After she died he married again, and had five children with his second wife, of whom Harry was the first. The first son of the first marriage, Charlie, went on to play Test cricket for South Africa.

Harry married Olive Thomson in Johannesburg in April 1914, and they lived in Boksburg until they divorced in 1921. They had no children. Harry worked for some time as a hotel clerk in Boksburg, and at the time of his death from heart failure in 1935 he was working as a timekeeper for a local mining company.

== Cricket career ==
Smith made his first-class debut in 1905-06 for Transvaal against the touring MCC, batting at number ten and scoring 0 and 27. In 1906-07, when Transvaal won the Currie Cup, he played in two of their games, scoring 27 in the first against Western Province, batting at number nine, and 53 against Eastern Province, batting at number seven, Transvaal won each time by an innings.

At the end of the season, after four first-class matches, with 138 runs at an average of 23.00, he was selected among the 15 players – eight of them from Transvaal – to tour the British Isles in 1907.

Of the 27 first-class matches the South Africans played on the tour Smith played only 11, batting low in the order as usual and scoring 183 runs at an average of 14.07. His top score was 40 not out, when he added 67 for the last wicket with Cyril Robinson against Sussex. However, with 83 at number ten he was the top scorer for either side in the victory in the non-first-class match against Durham.

After the tour, Smith played only one more first-class match. In 1908-09 he represented the Wanderers Cricket Club of Johannesburg against a team from the rest of South Africa in a match held to celebrate the 20th anniversary of the formation of the Wanderers club. Batting unusually high in the order, he made 45 at number three in the first innings and 29 opening in the second.
