= Sidney Stanley (cricketer) =

South African cricketer (born 1933)

Personal information
- Born: 14 December 1933; Pretoria, Transvaal, South Africa
- Died: 12 August 2023 (aged 89)
- Batting: Right-handed
- Bowling: Right-arm leg-spin

Domestic team information
- Years: Team
- 1959–60 to 1960–61: Transvaal
- 1962–63 to 1963–64: North Eastern Transvaal

Career statistics
Competition	First-class
Matches	14
Runs scored	70
Batting average	4.11
100s/50s	0/0
Top score	16
Balls bowled	2927
Wickets	49
Bowling average	31.42
5 wickets in innings	2
10 wickets in match	1
Best bowling	5/60
Catches/stumpings	2/–
- Source: CricketArchive, 29 August 2017

Sidney Stanley (14 December 1933 – 12 August 2023) was a South African cricketer who played first-class cricket from 1959 to 1964.

A leg-spin bowler, Stanley made his first-class debut for Transvaal B in 1959–60. He was immediately promoted to the Transvaal first team for the Currie Cup A Section match against Western Province, and took 5 for 112 and 5 for 60 in a victory for Transvaal. At the end of the season, he was included in trial matches for the South African tour of England but was not selected for the tour. Wisden said, "As a leg-spinner he was considered to have the most natural action this country has seen for a long time," and considered him unlucky not to be selected in the touring side.

He was less successful for Transvaal in 1960–61, and played for North Eastern Transvaal in the B Section of the Currie Cup in 1962–63 and 1963–64, with reasonable success. That was the extent of his first-class career.
