= Edward Marvin =

South African cricketer and South African Army soldier

Personal information
- Full name: Edward William Marvin
- Born: 7 July 1878; Leicester, Leicestershire, England
- Died: 24 March 1918 (aged 39); Bouchavesnes-Bergen, Somme, France
- Batting: Unknown

Domestic team information
- Years: Team
- 1908/09: Transvaal

Career statistics
Competition	First-class
Matches	2
Runs scored	47
Batting average	15.66
100s/50s	–/–
Top score	29
Catches/stumpings	3/–
- Source: Cricinfo, 12 June 2022

Edward William Marvin (7 July 1878 – 24 March 1918) was an English-born South African first-class cricketer and South African Army soldier.

Marvin was born at Leicester in July 1878. He later emigrated to Transvaal Colony, where he played two first-class cricket matches for Gauteng in the 1908-09 Currie Cup against Border and Western Province. He scored 47 runs in these matches, with a highest score of 29. Marvin served in the First World War as a private in the South African Infantry, which formed part of the South African Overseas Expeditionary Force on the Western Front. On 21 March 1918, the Germans launched a new offensive, Operation Michael, during which Marvin was killed in action at Maricourt Wood on 24 March.
