= Milley =

Milley is a surname. Notable individuals with this surname include:

- Mark Milley (b. 1958), four star general who was Chairman of the United States Joint Chiefs of Staff from 2019 to 2023
- Norm Milley (b. 1980), Canadian former professional ice hockey player
- Thomas Milley (lived c. 1500), for whom Dr Milley's Hospital in Lichfield, UK was named

Like many surnames, Milley also appears as a middle name:

- John Milley Doyle (1781–1856), Anglo-Irish soldier

== See also ==
- Millie
