= Charlie Smith (South African cricketer) =

South African cricketer (1872–1947)

Personal information
- Full name: Charles James Edward Smith
- Born: 25 December 1872; Gamtoos River, Cape Colony
- Died: 27 March 1947 (aged 74); Joubert Park, Transvaal, South Africa
- Batting: Right-handed
- Relatives: Harry Smith (half-brother)

International information
- National side: South Africa
- Test debut: 11 October 1902 v Australia
- Last Test: 8 November 1902 v Australia

Domestic team information
- Years: Team
- 1893/94–1905/05: Transvaal

Career statistics
Competition	Tests	First-class
Matches	3	10
Runs scored	106	409
Batting average	21.19	24.05
100s/50s	0/0	0/2
Top score	45	70
Balls bowled	–	130
Wickets	–	2
Bowling average	–	51.00
5 wickets in innings	–	0
10 wickets in match	–	0
Best bowling	–	2/28
Catches/stumpings	2/–	8/–
- Source: Cricinfo

Charles James Edward Smith (25 December 1872 – 27 March 1947) was a South African cricketer who played in three Tests in 1902.

Smith was a right-handed middle-order batsman who played a few first-class matches for Transvaal between 1894 and 1904. He made his highest first-class score in the final of the Currie Cup in 1896–97, when he scored 70 against Western Province. When the Australians toured South Africa in 1902 he made 58 and 71 not out for a Transvaal XV and was selected for the three Tests. His best score in the three Tests was 45 in the second innings of the Third Test, when he and Bill Shalders added 79 for the second wicket after South Africa followed on 167 runs behind.
