= W. H. Laverton's Ground =

Historic cricket ground in Westbury, Wiltshire, England

Coordinates: 51.254°N 2.183°W

- Wellhead Lane; Leighton Sports Field
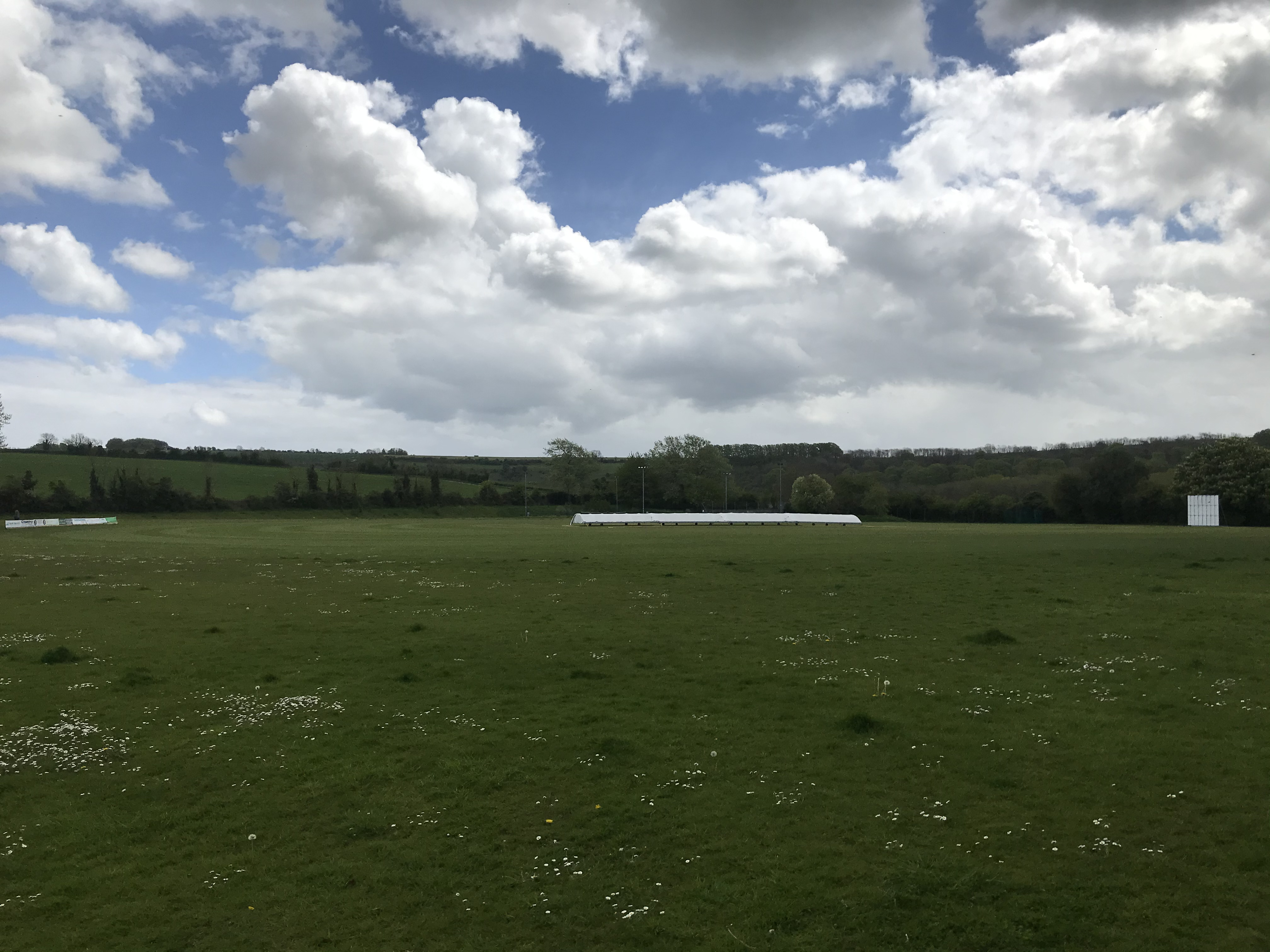
- Interactive map of W. H. Laverton's Ground

Ground information
- Location: Westbury, Wiltshire
- Country: England
- Establishment: 1888 (first recorded match)

Team information
W. H. Laverton's XI	(1890)
- As of 11 August 2010; Source: Ground profile

W. H. Laverton's Ground is a historic cricket ground in Westbury, Wiltshire. The first recorded match on the ground was in 1888, when W. H. Laverton's XI played O. G. Radcliffe's XI. The ground hosted a single first-class match in 1890, which saw W. H. Laverton's XI playing the touring Australians.

Originally part of the grounds of Leighton House, which is today home to the Army Officer Selection Board, the field is now part of Wiltshire Council's Leighton Recreation Centre complex in Wellhead Lane, Westbury, and the Westbury & District Cricket Club is based there.

Wiltshire County Cricket Club played some matches at the ground in the early 21st century. They returned for a Twenty20 doubleheader against Berkshire in April 2024.
