= William Malraison =

South African cricketer and South African Army soldier

Personal information
- Full name: William Henry de Rockstro Malraison
- Born: 4 December 1876; Wepener, Orange Free State
- Died: 31 May 1916 (aged 39); German East Africa
- Batting: Unknown

Domestic team information
- Years: Team
- 1904/05: Transvaal

Career statistics
Competition	First-class
Matches	2
Runs scored	41
Batting average	20.50
100s/50s	–/–
Top score	28
Catches/stumpings	1/–
- Source: Cricinfo, 30 March 2021

William Henry de Rockstro Malraison (4 December 1876 – 31 May 1916) was a South African first-class cricketer and South African Army soldier.

Malraison was born at Wepener in the Orange Free State in December 1876 to Bernard de Rockstro Malraison and his wife, Annie Georgina. Malraison is recorded as standing as umpire in two first-class matches in 1895 in the Currie Cup, however given he would have been 18 years of age at the time these matches were played, it is plausible this was instead his father who stood in these matches, given he was a well known scorer and had previously umpired minor matches in South Africa. Malraison later made two appearances in first-class cricket for Transvaal in 1904 in the Currie Cup against Natal at Durban and Griqualand West at Johannesburg. He scored 41 runs across his two matches, with a highest score of 28. Malraison fought in the First World War with the South African Army, holding the rank of corporal in the 1st South African Horse. He died on 31 May 1916 from fever while serving in German East Africa. He was buried at the Dar es Salaam Cemetery.
