= Norman Norton =

South African cricketer (1881–1968)

Personal information
- Full name: Norman Ogilvie Norton
- Born: 11 May 1881; Grahamstown, Cape Colony
- Died: 27 June 1968 (aged 87); East London, South Africa
- Nickname: Pompey
- Batting: Right-handed
- Bowling: Right-arm medium

International information
- National side: South Africa

Career statistics
Competition	Tests	First-class
Matches	1	15
Runs scored	9	347
Batting average	4.50	15.08
100s/50s	0/0	0/2
Top score	7	57
Balls bowled	90	1798
Wickets	4	49
Bowling average	11.75	15.75
5 wickets in innings	0	1
10 wickets in match	0	1
Best bowling	4/47	6/34
Catches/stumpings	0/0	7/0
- Source: CricketArchive

Norman Ogilvie "Pompey" Norton (11 May 1881 – 27 June 1968) was a South African cricketer. He was a lawyer by career and became a provincial administrator for the game.

An all-rounder, Norton made his first-class debut with Western Province versus an Australian team in 1902. He returned in 1907 with Border and within two years attained a personal best score of 57 during a game in Cape Town against Western Province. In another game at Cape Town during the 1908/09 season, he took 6 for 34 against Eastern Province, taking 10 for 92 in the match and also making a second and last first-class fifty.

In the 1909/10 season, Norton played in the Fifth Test against the touring English team. He took 4 for 47, including the wickets of Jack Hobbs and Frank Woolley, and scored 2 and 7.

Norton founded the East London law firm of Norton Gale and Kingon. He also served as mayor of East London.
