= Francois Weideman =

South African cricketer

Personal information
- Full name: Izak Francois Nel Weideman
- Born: 19 September 1960; Johannesburg, Transvaal, South Africa
- Died: 4 June 2001 (aged 40); Maraisburg, Gauteng, South Africa
- Batting: Right-handed
- Bowling: Right-arm fast-medium
- Role: Bowler

Domestic team information
- Years: Team
- 1980/81–1982/83: South African Universities
- 1980/81–1982/83: Transvaal
- 1983/84–1986/87: Northern Transvaal

Career statistics
Competition	First-class	List A
Matches	40	30
Runs scored	662	134
Batting average	15.39	12.18
100s/50s	0/0	0/1
Top score	47*	60*
Balls bowled	6,432	1,446
Wickets	135	27
Bowling average	22.34	33.03
5 wickets in innings	2	0
10 wickets in match	0	0
Best bowling	6/43	3/46
Catches/stumpings	18/–	9/–
- Source: CricketArchive, 16 November 2022

Izak Francois Nel Weideman (19 September 1960 – 4 June 2001) was a South African first-class cricketer who played for Transvaal and Northern Transvaal in the Currie Cup.

A right-arm fast-medium bowler, Weideman made his first-class debut on 9 December 1980, playing for South African Universities against Northern Transvaal. He had been studying at Rand Afrikaans University. For the rest of the 1980/81 season he played for Transvaal B in the SAB Bowl and also made one appearance for their Currie Cup team. He competed in the SAB Bowl for the entirety of 1981/82, unable to earn promotion to Clive Rice's side. In 1982/83, Transvaal won the Currie Cup and Weideman took part in three fixtures.

In 1983/84 he made the move to Northern Transvaal and would be a regular member of their senior side, taking a total of 48 wickets at 28.77 and a further 19 wickets for Northern Transvaal B. It was with Northern Transvaal that he took the only two five wicket hauls of his career. His best innings figures, 6–43, were made against Eastern Province in 1985.

After retiring he worked for the South African Cricket Union, as part of a development program aimed at disadvantaged communities.

Weideman later found employment as a greenskeeper at the CMR Golf Course in Maraisburg and was killed there in 2001 during a robbery attempt. He was shot in the neck, stomach and leg.
