= Jim Fuller (footballer) =

Australian rules footballer

Personal information
- Full name: Jim Fuller
- Born: 18 November 1943 (age 82)
- Original team: Coragulac
- Height: 180 cm (5 ft 11 in)
- Weight: 76 kg (168 lb)

Playing career^{1}
Years	Club	Games (Goals)
1963	South Melbourne	1 (0)
- ^{1} Playing statistics correct to the end of 1963.

Jim Fuller (born 18 November 1943) is a former Australian rules footballer who played with South Melbourne in the Victorian Football League (VFL).
