= Maile (disambiguation) =

Maile is a species of flowering plant in the dogbane family, Apocynaceae, that is endemic to Hawaii.

Maile may also refer to:

== People named Maile ==
=== Given name ===
- Maile Chapman, American novelist and short story writer.
- Maile Flanagan (born 1965), American actress
- Maile Meloy (born 1972), American fiction author
- Maile Meyer (born 1957), Native Hawaiian activist and entrepreneur
- Maile Misajon (born 1976), American singer and songwriter
- Maile Mölder (born 1977), Estonian curler and curling coach
- Maile O'Keefe (born 2002), American gymnast
- Maile Shimabukuro (born 1970), member of the Hawaii House of Representatives

=== Surname ===
- Heiko Maile (born 1966), German musician and composer
- John Maile (1926–2004), South African cricketer
- Luke Maile (born 1991), American baseball player
- Pita Maile (born 1990), Tongan rugby league player
- Thabiso Maile (born 1987), Mosotho footballer
- Tim Maile, American television writer
- Vic Maile (1943–1989), British record producer

== Fictional characters ==
- Maile Duval, in the 1961 movie Blue Hawaii

== See also ==
- Miley (disambiguation)
