= Claude Floquet =

South African cricketer (1884–1963)

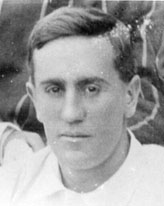

Personal information
- Full name: Claude Eugene Floquet
- Born: 3 November 1884; Aliwal North, Cape Colony
- Died: 22 November 1963 (aged 79); Port Elizabeth, South Africa
- Batting: Right-handed
- Bowling: Right-arm medium

International information
- National side: South Africa

Career statistics
Competition	Tests	First-class
Matches	1	6
Runs scored	12	104
Batting average	12.00	26.00
100s/50s	0/0	0/0
Top score	11*	29
Balls bowled	48	348
Wickets	0	4
Bowling average	–	43.75
5 wickets in innings	0	0
10 wickets in match	0	0
Best bowling	–	2/50
Catches/stumpings	0/–	2/–
- Source: Cricinfo, 27 March 2025

Claude Eugene Floquet (3 November 1884 – 22 November 1963) was a South African cricketer. An occasional player for Transvaal from 1905 to 1910, he played a Test match for South Africa in 1910.

Floquet's first-class career of just six matches was spread over six seasons between 1904–05 and 1910–11. He batted right-handed in the middle to lower part of the order and bowled medium-pace occasionally. He appeared in the Third Test of the series against England on their tour of 1909-10, which was played at the Old Wanderers Ground in Johannesburg, as were all Floquet's first-class matches. He scored 1 and 11 not out and took 0 for 24 with the ball.

Floquet married Clara Dodd in Johannesburg in May 1912. His older brother Bertram also played for Transvaal.
