= William Brann (cricketer) =

South African cricketer (1899–1953)

Personal information
- Full name: William Richard Brann
- Born: 4 April 1899; Port Elizabeth, Cape Colony
- Died: 22 September 1953 (aged 54); Port Elizabeth, Cape Province, South Africa
- Batting: Right-handed

International information
- National side: South Africa
- Test debut: 23 December 1922 v England
- Last Test: 18 January 1923 v England

Domestic team information
- Years: Team
- 1920/21–1933/34: Eastern Province

Career statistics
Competition	Test	First-class
Matches	3	25
Runs scored	71	1,045
Batting average	14.19	22.23
100s/50s	0/1	0/8
Top score	50	97
Balls bowled	–	195
Wickets	–	4
Bowling average	–	35.25
5 wickets in innings	–	0
10 wickets in match	–	0
Best bowling	–	1/1
Catches/stumpings	2/–	21/–
- Source: Cricinfo, 14 November 2022

William Henry Brann (4 April 1899 – 22 September 1953) was a South African cricketer who played in three Test matches in the 1922–23 season.

Brann was born in Port Elizabeth, where he attended Grey High School. A batsman and occasional bowler, he played in the Currie Cup for Eastern Province from 1922 to 1934. He was one of the leading South African batsmen in 1921–22, scoring 393 runs in first-class matches at an average of 56.14, including 97 and 83 not out in the victory over Western Province.

Brann was selected in the South African team for the first three Test matches against England in 1922–23. In his first match he scored 50 in the second innings, helping South Africa to victory by 168 runs.

Brann worked as a clerk in the Cape Province civil service. He married Violet Doreen Taylor in Port Elizabeth in June 1942. In September 1953, after a short illness, he died of acute congestive cardiac failure in the Provincial Hospital in Port Elizabeth, aged 54.
