= William Foley (cricketer) =

South African cricketer

Personal information
- Full name: William Bernard Henry Foley
- Born: 3 October 1906; Cape Town, Cape Colony
- Died: 13 August 1963 (aged 56); Bergvliet, Cape Town, Cape Province, South Africa
- Batting: Right-handed

Domestic team information
- Years: Team
- 1925–26 to 1936–37: Transvaal
- 1937–38 to 1947–48: Western Province

Career statistics
Competition	First-class
Matches	35
Runs scored	1941
Batting average	44.11
100s/50s	1/14
Top score	153
Balls bowled	138
Wickets	0
Bowling average	–
5 wickets in innings	0
10 wickets in match	0
Best bowling	–
Catches/stumpings	10/0
- Source: Cricinfo, 26 July 2020

William Bernard Henry Foley (3 October 1906 – 13 August 1963) was a South African cricketer who played first-class cricket from 1926 to 1947.

A hard-hitting batsman and brilliant fieldsman, Foley was one of the leading batsmen in the Currie Cup in 1929–30, scoring 446 runs for Transvaal at an average of 74.33. In the final match of the tournament, when Transvaal needed a victory to win the trophy, he scored 153, enabling Transvaal to make 417 all out and take four Rhodesian wickets by stumps on the first day. Transvaal won by an innings and secured the Currie Cup. In senior cricket in Johannesburg in 1929–30 he scored three centuries in consecutive innings "as a result of great hitting", including one in which he hit 13 sixes. In 1934–35, when Transvaal again won the Currie Cup, Foley scored 359 runs at 59.83.

He and his wife Gladys had five children.
