= Tony Tillim =

South African cricketer (1938–2008)

Personal information
- Full name: Anthony Frank Tillim
- Born: 8 April 1938; Johannesburg, Transvaal, South Africa
- Died: 8 January 2008 (aged 69); Houghton, Johannesburg, Gauteng, South Africa
- Batting: Right-handed
- Bowling: Right-arm leg-spin

Domestic team information
- Years: Team
- 1958–59 to 1959–60, 1968–69: Natal
- 1961–62 to 1966–67: Transvaal

Career statistics
Competition	First-class
Matches	36
Runs scored	729
Batting average	15.51
100s/50s	0/1
Top score	57*
Balls bowled	4761
Wickets	92
Bowling average	24.36
5 wickets in innings	5
10 wickets in match	0
Best bowling	7/34
Catches/stumpings	11/0
- Source: Cricinfo, 16 August 2021

Anthony Frank Tillim (8 April 1938 – 8 January 2008) was a South African cricketer who played first-class cricket for Natal and Transvaal between 1959 and 1968.

Tillim was a leg-spin bowler. His best first-class figures were 7 for 34 in his first appearance for Transvaal, against Eastern Province in 1961–62. He took 31 wickets at an average of 24.51 in the 1962–63 season, but was not selected for the tour of Australia in 1963–64. His last first-class wicket, a googly that bowled Neil Hawke, gave Transvaal victory over the touring Australians in November 1966 – the first time an Australian team had lost a first-class match in South Africa.
