= William Duff (cricketer) =

South African cricketer and soldier

Personal information
- Full name: William Dick Duff
- Born: 19 September 1890; Pietermaritzburg, Natal
- Died: 7 October 1953 (aged 63); Johannesburg, Transvaal, South Africa
- Bowling: Right-arm leg-spin

Domestic team information
- Years: Team
- 1919–20 to 1924–25: Transvaal

Career statistics
Competition	First-class
Matches	10
Runs scored	72
Batting average	9.00
100s/50s	0/0
Top score	18 not out
Balls bowled	1035
Wickets	24
Bowling average	31.33
5 wickets in innings	0
10 wickets in match	0
Best bowling	4/37
Catches/stumpings	7/–
- Source: Cricinfo, 27 October 2017

William Dick Duff MC (19 September 1890 – 7 October 1953) was a South African soldier and cricketer.

== Military career ==
Born in Pietermaritzburg, William Duff enlisted as a private in the 1st Mounted Rifles (Natal Carbineers) in August 1914 and was commissioned a lieutenant in the 6th South African Infantry in December 1915. He embarked for East Africa in January 1916, and was severely wounded on 21 March. After recovering and returning to duty in November 1916, he served as aide-de-camp to the General Officer Commanding the 2nd East African Infantry Brigade. Suffering from malaria and anaemia, he was released from service on 2 January 1918. He was awarded the Military Cross.

== Cricket career ==
A leg-break and googly bowler, Duff made his first-class debut in 1919. Playing in his first Currie Cup match a year later, he took 4 for 37 and 3 for 55 in Transvaal's innings victory over Griqualand West.

He played irregularly for Transvaal over the next four seasons. In 1924–25 when S. B. Joel's English team toured, he took three wickets against them for Transvaal in a first-class match followed immediately by seven wickets for East Rand in a two-day match. He was selected for South Africa in the second and third of the five unofficial Tests, but took only three wickets. He played no further first-class cricket.
