= Diaan van Wyk =

South African cricketer (born 1981)

Personal information
- Full name: Diaan Marinus van Wyk
- Born: 19 January 1981 (age 45); Roodepoort, South Africa
- Batting: Right-handed
- Role: Batsman; Wicket-keeper

Domestic team information
- Years: Team
- 2005–: Gauteng

Career statistics
Competition	FC	LA
Matches	20	30
Runs scored	1016	874
Batting average	40.64	41.61
100s/50s	1/8	0/8
Top score	122*	83*
Catches/stumpings	84/14	40/9
- Source: Cricinfo, 5 April 2014

Diaan van Wyk (born 19 January 1981 in Roodepoort, Gauteng) is a South African right-handed batsman and wicketkeeper who plays for Gauteng in South African domestic cricket.
