= James Fuller (Rhodesian cricketer) =

Rhodesian cricketer (1916–1967)

James Herbert Frederick Fuller (10 April 1916 – 26 January 1967) was a Rhodesian cricketer who made 15 first class cricket appearances for Rhodesia and Transvaal cricket teams between 1935 and 1948. A wicket-keeper and right-hand batsman, he scored one century.
