= John Maile =

South African cricketer (1926–2004)

Personal information
- Full name: John Brian Roland Maile
- Born: 15 October 1926; Johannesburg, Transvaal, South Africa
- Died: 27 October 2004 (aged 78); Bergvliet, Cape Town, Western Cape, South Africa
- Batting: Right-handed
- Bowling: Right-arm off-spin, right-arm fast-medium
- Role: All-rounder

Domestic team information
- Years: Team
- 1951/52–1953/54: Transvaal
- 1955/56–1960/61: Western Province

Career statistics
Competition	First-class
Matches	35
Runs scored	1,134
Batting average	22.68
100s/50s	1/3
Top score	108
Balls bowled	5,346
Wickets	75
Bowling average	24.70
5 wickets in innings	3
10 wickets in match	0
Best bowling	7/27
Catches/stumpings	35/–
- Source: Cricinfo, 26 April 2024

John Brian Roland Maile (15 October 1926 – 27 October 2004) was a South African cricketer who played first-class cricket for Transvaal and Western Province between 1951–52 and 1960–61.

== Biography ==
Maile was born in Johannesburg and studied there at the University of the Witwatersrand in the 1950s. An all-rounder who batted in the middle or lower order and could bowl either pace or off-spin, he played a few seasons of Currie Cup cricket for Transvaal without conspicuous success before moving to Western Province and establishing himself in the side in 1958–59, when he was one of the leading all-rounders in the country. In 1958–59 he made 408 runs at an average of 40.80 and took 15 wickets at 26.53, and in 1959–60 he made 208 runs at 23.11 and took 28 wickets at 16.92.

The 1959–60 season included Maile's best performances. He scored his only first-class century, 108 for Western Province against Border in the opening match of the Currie Cup. Later, in consecutive weeks, he took 1 for 28 and 7 for 27 in the return match against Border, and then 4 for 91 and 5 for 106 against Transvaal. He was chosen as one of the South African Cricket Annual Cricketers of the Year in 1960.
