= Enoch Nkwe =

South African cricketer

Personal information
- Full name: Thabiso Enoch Nkwe
- Born: 8 February 1983 (age 43); Soweto, Johannesburg
- Batting: Right-handed
- Bowling: Right-arm medium-fast
- Role: All-rounder

Domestic team information
- Years: Team
- 2002–2004: Gauteng
- 2004–2009: Highveld Lions
- Source: CricketArchive, July 8 2016

Thabiso Enoch Nkwe (born 8 February 1983) is a South African cricket coach and former first class cricketer. He played 42 first class and 38 List A matches for Lions and Gauteng between 2002 and 2009 before becoming a coach. He is Cricket South Africa Director of Cricket.

== Early life ==
Nkwe was born in Soweto, Johannesburg. He played football until the age of eleven when he was introduced to cricket. This led to him being awarded a cricket scholarship to attend St Stithians College in Johannesburg.

== Playing career ==
Nkwe made a century on his first class debut for Gauteng against Easterns at the age of 19 in 2002. He was the first black South African player to do so and only the fourth Gauteng player to achieve this. His form earned him a call up to the National Academy in 2003. His career was cut short at the age of 26 due to a wrist injury.

== Coaching career ==
Nkwe joined Dutch club HCC Rood en Wit as player-coach and won the Hoofdklasse in 2005 and 2010 respectively. Later in 2010 he was named Head Coach of Gauteng under-19s before being named Assistant Coach of the South Africa under-19 team in 2011 under then Head Coach, Ray Jennings.

Following his success with Gauteng, Nkwe became Head Coach of the Lions Cubs and led them to the CSA Cubs Week title in 2013. In the same year, he was named Head Coach of Gauteng Strikers with whom he won all three Cricket South Africa competitions between 2013 and 2016. He was named CSA Amateur Coach of the Year in 2015.

In 2016, Nkwe joined the Netherlands National Cricket Team as Assistant Coach to Anton Roux. He returned to South Africa in 2018 to take over as Head Coach of the Highveld Lions winning both the CSA T20 Challenge and the 4Day Sunfoil Series in his first season. He was named Head Coach of Jozi Stars for the inaugural Mzansi Super League in 2018, winning the tournament. In the same year he joined Vancouver Knights as Assistant Coach in the Global T20 Canada where the team finished runners up.

In August 2019, Nkwe was appointed interim Team Director of the South African National Team.

Nkwe was named as permanent South African National Team Assistant Coach in December 2019. He tendered his resignation in August 2021.

He was appointed Cricket South Africa Director of Cricket in June 2022.
