= Shane Burger =

South African cricketer (born 1982)

Personal information
- Born: 31 August 1982 (age 44); Johannesburg, South Africa
- Batting: Right-handed
- Bowling: Right-arm fast-medium

Domestic team information
- Years: Team
- 2001/02–2012/13: Gauteng
- 2006/07–2011/12: Lions
- 2011/12: Southern Rocks
- 2013/14–2014/15: KwaZulu-Natal Inland

Head coaching information
- Years: Team
- 2015–2019: KwaZulu-Natal Inland
- 2019–2023: Scotland

Career statistics
Competition	FC	LA	T20
Matches	91	79	36
Runs scored	3,839	1,332	422
Batting average	33.67	37.00	38.36
100s/50s	6/19	1/4	0/1
Top score	153*	100*	62
Balls bowled	9,114	2,210	472
Wickets	171	68	23
Bowling average	24.47	26.47	26.04
5 wickets in innings	4	1	0
10 wickets in match	0	0	0
Best bowling	5/13	5/44	4/31
Catches/stumpings	83/–	42/–	16/2
- Source: Cricinfo, 15 January 2019

Shane Burger (born 31 August 1982) is a South African former cricketer who played first-class cricket for KwaZulu-Natal Inland. In January 2019, he was appointed as the head coach of the Scotland national cricket team. On his appointment, Burger said he was "both delighted and honoured". In January 2023, Burger was appointed Somerset’s assistant coach and left his position as head coach of the Scottish team.
