= S. L. Harris =

South African cricket umpire

Umpiring information
- Tests umpired: 4 (1910–1923)
- Source: Cricinfo, 7 July 2013

S. L. Harris was a South African cricket umpire. He stood in four Test matches between 1910 and 1923.

== See also ==
- List of Test cricket umpires
