= Doug Meintjes =

South African cricketer (1890–1979)

Personal information
- Full name: Douglas James Meintjes
- Born: 9 June 1890; Pretoria, Transvaal
- Died: 17 July 1979 (aged 89); Johannesburg, Transvaal, South Africa
- Batting: Right-handed
- Bowling: Right-arm fast-medium

International information
- National side: South Africa
- Test debut: 9 February 1923 v England
- Last Test: 16 February 1923 v England

Domestic team information
- Years: Team
- 1910/11–1925/26: Transvaal

Career statistics
| Competition | Test | First-class |
|---|---|---|
| Matches | 2 | 52 |
| Runs scored | 43 | 1,146 |
| Batting average | 14.33 | 16.14 |
| 100s/50s | 0/0 | 0/2 |
| Top score | 21 | 87 |
| Balls bowled | 246 | 5,159 |
| Wickets | 6 | 91 |
| Bowling average | 19.16 | 29.64 |
| 5 wickets in innings | 0 | 1 |
| 10 wickets in match | 0 | 1 |
| Best bowling | 3/38 | 8/63 |
| Catches/stumpings | 3/– | 25/– |
- Source: Cricinfo, 3 November 2017

Douglas James Meintjes (9 June 1890 – 17 July 1979) was a South African cricketer who played in two Test matches in 1923. He played first-class cricket for Transvaal from 1910 to 1926.
