= Tom Campbell (South African cricketer) =

South African cricketer (1882–1924)

- Campbell in 1912

Personal information
- Full name: Thomas Campbell
- Born: 9 February 1882; Edinburgh, Midlothian, Scotland
- Died: 5 October 1924 (aged 42 years); Milndale Railway Siding, Natal
- Batting: Right-handed
- Role: Wicket-keeper

International information
- National side: South Africa
- Test debut (cap 65): 1 January 1910 v England
- Last Test: 10 June 1912 v England

Career statistics
Competition	Tests	First-class
Matches	5	29
Runs scored	90	365
Batting average	15.00	12.16
100s/50s	0/0	0/0
Top score	48	48
Catches/stumpings	7/1	40/12
- Source: Cricinfo

Thomas Campbell (9 February 1882 – 5 October 1924) was a South African cricketer who played in five Test matches from 1910 to 1912. He was born in Edinburgh, Scotland.

Campbell died in Natal in 1924, as a result of a railway accident.

== See also ==
- List of Test cricketers born in non-Test playing nations
