= Beaconsfield, Kimberley =

Beaconsfield
- Location within Northern Cape Location within South Africa
- Coordinates: 28.757°S 24.782°E
- Country: South Africa
- Province: Northern Cape
- District: Frances Baard
- Municipality: Sol Plaatje
- Main Place: Kimberley

Area
  - Total: 1.68 km^{2} (0.65 sq mi)

Population (2011)
  - Total: 5,494
  - Density: 3,270/km^{2} (8,470/sq mi)

Racial makeup (2011)
  - Black African: 24.5%
  - Coloured: 28.3%
  - Indian/Asian: 1.4%
  - White: 45.3%
  - Other: 0.5%

First languages (2011)
  - Afrikaans: 68.4%
  - English: 14.9%
  - Tswana: 8.5%
  - Xhosa: 2.3%
  - Other: 5.9%
- Time zone: UTC+2 (SAST)
- Postal code (street): 8301
- PO box: 8315

Beaconsfield is a suburb of Kimberley, South Africa, formerly known as Du Toit's Pan. Beaconsfield was a separate borough from Kimberley itself until its amalgamation with the latter as the City of Kimberley in 1912.
