= Peter Dodds (cricketer) =

South African cricketer (1933–2022)

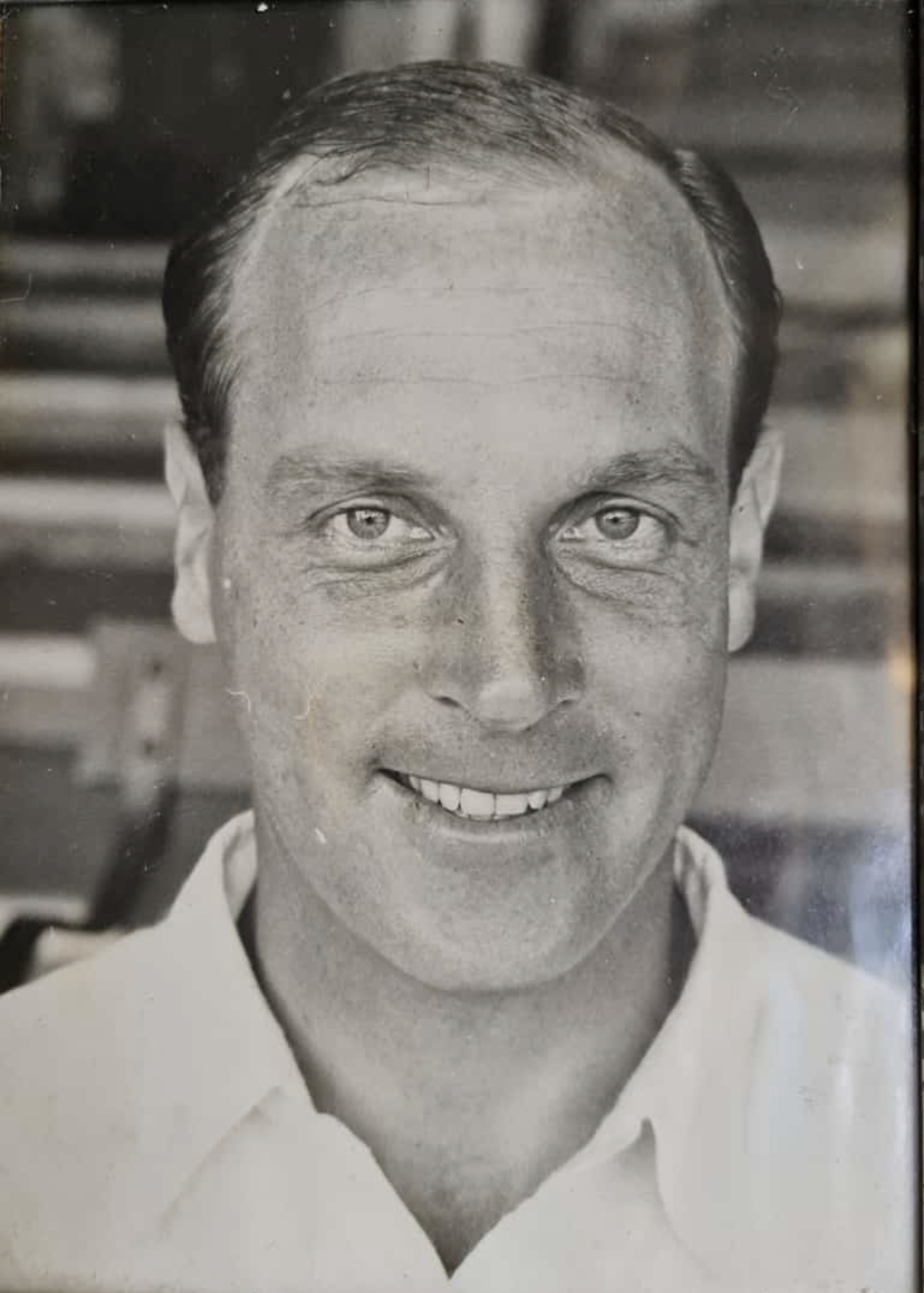

Personal information
- Full name: Peter Michael Dodds
- Born: 26 November 1933; Durban, Natal, South Africa
- Died: 11 May 2022 (aged 88)
- Batting: Left-handed
- Bowling: Slow left-arm orthodox

Domestic team information
- Years: Team
- 1955–56: Transvaal
- 1956–57 to 1963–64: Natal

Career statistics
Competition	First-class
Matches	39
Runs scored	333
Batting average	8.76
100s/50s	0/0
Top score	27 not out
Balls bowled	9,400
Wickets	120
Bowling average	29.07
5 wickets in innings	7
10 wickets in match	2
Best bowling	7/51
Catches/stumpings	10/–
- Source: CricketArchive, 30 December 2016

Peter Michael Dodds (26 November 1933 – 11 May 2022) was a South African cricketer who played first-class cricket from 1955 to 1964.

== Cricket career ==
Born in Durban, Dodds attended Durban High School. He played one match for Transvaal in 1955 before moving to Natal, where he spent the rest of his first-class career.

A left-arm spinner, Dodds had modest success until 1958–59, when he took 35 wickets at an average of 18.37, the third-highest tally of wickets in South Africa that season. In a friendly match at the end of the season against a Border and Eastern Province Combined XI he took 6 for 37 and 7 for 51 to give Natal an innings victory.

He played irregularly over the next three seasons, but played throughout 1962–63, taking 36 wickets at 21.72. In Natal's ten-wicket victory over Eastern Province he took 5 for 45 and 5 for 73. Natal won the Currie Cup, with five victories in six matches. Dodds was widely considered unfortunate not to be selected for the 1963–64 tour of Australia and New Zealand.

Dodds played his last season of first-class cricket in 1963–64. He died in May 2022, aged 88.
