= Dale Deeb =

South African cricketer

Personal information
- Full name: Dale Robin Deeb
- Born: 8 September 1990 (age 36); Johannesburg, Transvaal, South Africa
- Batting: Right-handed
- Bowling: Slow left arm orthodox

Domestic team information
- Years: Team
- Gauteng
- Lions
- FC debut: 24 January 2008 Gauteng v Northerns
- Last FC: 29 January 2015 Gauteng v Namibia
- LA debut: 5 October 2008 Gauteng v Eastern Province
- Last LA: 1 February 2015 Gauteng v Namibia

Career statistics
Competition	FC	LA	T20
Matches	73	34	12
Runs scored	2,179	266	57
Batting average	26.25	14.77	9.50
100s/50s	4/9	0/0	0/0
Top score	112	37	21
Balls bowled	12,240	1,393	240
Wickets	221	37	10
Bowling average	27.19	30.05	24.90
5 wickets in innings	4	0	0
10 wickets in match	1	0	0
Best bowling	6/50	3/25	2/16
Catches/stumpings	58/–	10/–	3/–
- Source: ESPNcricinfo, 6 November 2022

Dale Robin Deeb (born 8 September 1990) is a South African former cricketer. He is a left-handed batsman and a left-arm slow bowler who played for Gauteng.

Deeb began his first-class career in January 2008, playing four games in the SAA Provincial Three-Day Challenge. He took five wickets in his debut match.

Deeb was the second highest wicket-taker for South Africa Under-19s in their series win over England in January 2009. He played twelve Youth ODIs and one Youth T20 in total.

In 2012 he was appointed as Professional for Blackpool Cricket Club in the Northern Cricket League.

He had a successful season in South Africa in 2014–15 but, seeing little prospect of making a livelihood from the sport, he retired from cricket to work for a company that imports ceilings and partitions for offices and homes.
