= Brendon Adams =

South African cricketer (born 1984)

Personal information
- Full name: Brendon Claude Adams
- Born: 10 March 1984 (age 42); Paarl, South Africa
- Batting: Left-handed
- Bowling: Left-arm orthodox spin

Domestic team information
- Years: Team
- 2004–2005: Boland
- 2005–2006: Gauteng
- 2006–2009: Boland
- First-class debut: 4 November 2004 Boland v Eastern Province
- Last First-class: 8 January 2009 Boland v South Western Districts
- List A debut: 16 January 2005 Boland v North West
- Last List A: 11 January 2009 Boland v South Western Districts

Career statistics
Competition	First-class	List A
Matches	29	26
Runs scored	1,541	398
Batting average	34.24	26.53
100s/50s	2/8	0/4
Top score	164*	69
Balls bowled	1,438	764
Wickets	10	15
Bowling average	84.40	43.06
5 wickets in innings	0	0
10 wickets in match	0	0
Best bowling	3–47	2–23
Catches/stumpings	15/–	5/–
- Source: CricketArchive, 13 April 2012

Brendon Claude Adams (born 10 March 1984) is a South African former cricketer.
