= S. B. Joel's cricket team in South Africa in 1924–25 =

International cricket tour

S. B. Joel's XI was a team of English cricketers that toured South Africa between November 1924 and February 1925 and played 14 first-class matches and seven other games. The tour was an unofficial one: an official tour of Australia organised by the Marylebone Cricket Club took place at the same time.

The tour was financed by the South African cricket authorities with assistance from the wealthy Anglo-South African financier Solomon Joel; at the time, it was generally referred to as "the Hon. L. H. Tennyson's XI" after the team's captain, Lionel Tennyson.

== The team ==
- Lionel Tennyson (captain)
- Ewart Astill
- Edward Bartley
- Ted Bowley
- George Geary
- Harold Gilligan
- Percy Holmes
- Tom Jameson
- Alec Kennedy
- Jack MacBryan
- Charles Marriott
- Fred Nicholas
- Charlie Parker
- Jack Russell
- Ernest Tyldesley

Most of the players had Test cricket experience before or after the tour: only Bartley, Jameson and Nicholas did not play Test cricket. Astill, who was coaching in South Africa, was not in the touring team but played in two of the matches against South Africa.

== The tour ==
The 14 first-class matches (some of them scheduled for only two days) were as follows:

- Western Province v S. B. Joel's XI, Newlands, Cape Town, 14, 15 November 1924. S. B. Joel's XI 252 for 9 declared; Western Province 118 and 82 for 8. Drawn.
- Natal v S. B. Joel's XI, City Oval, Pietermaritzburg, 19, 20 November 1924. S. B. Joel's XI 179 and 108 for 5; Natal 202. Drawn.
- Natal v S. B. Joel's XI, Kingsmead, Durban, 21, 22, 23 November 1924. S. B. Joel's XI 154 and 296 for 9 declared; Natal 116 and 172 for 4. Drawn.
- Griqualand West v S. B. Joel's XI, Athletic Club Ground, Kimberley, 29 November, 1, 2 December 1924. S. B. Joel's XI 272 and 362; Griqualand West 293 and 246 for 8. Drawn.
- Rhodesia v S. B. Joel's XI, Raylton Club, Bulawayo, 5, 6, 8 December 1924. S. B. Joel's XI 294 and 42 for 2; Rhodesia 121 and 212. S. B. Joel's XI won by 8 wickets.
- Transvaal v S. B. Joel's XI, Old Wanderers, Johannesburg, 16, 17, 18 December 1924. Transvaal 109 and 354; S. B. Joel's XI 349 and 117 for 2. S. B. Joel's XI won by 8 wickets.
- South Africa v S. B. Joel's XI (first match), Old Wanderers, Johannesburg, 23, 24, 26 December 1924. S. B. Joel's XI 198 and 149; South Africa 295 and 53 for 1. South Africa won by 9 wickets.

The South African captain, Vivian Neser, was the top scorer on either side, with 80 in the first innings. Buster Nupen took 5 for 54 and 5 for 33 for South Africa.

- South Africa v S. B. Joel's XI (second match), Kingsmead, Durban, 1, 2, 3, 5 January 1925. S. B. Joel's XI 285 and 174; South Africa 211 and 200. S. B. Joel's XI won by 48 runs.

Ted Bowley scored 118 and Nupen took 5 for 65 in S. B. Joel's XI's first innings; Herbie Taylor scored 112 and Ewart Astill took 5 for 65 in South Africa's. Nupen also took 7 for 46 in the second innings; Alec Kennedy took 5 for 51 for S. B. Joel's XI. Nupen took 22 wickets for 198 in the first two matches.

- South Africa v S. B. Joel's XI (third match), Newlands, Cape Town, 15, 16 January 1925. South Africa 113 and 150; S. B. Joel's XI 224 and 40 for no wicket. S. B. Joel's XI won by 9 wickets.

George Geary took 6 for 37 and 4 for 42. Alf Hall took 6 for 62 in S. B. Joel's XI's first innings. The highest scorer on either side was Jack Russell, with 54 in S. B. Joel's XI's first innings.

- Eastern Province v S. B. Joel's XI, City Lords, Grahamstown, 28, 29 January 1925. Eastern Province 62 and 165; S. B. Joel's XI 212 and 19 for 2. S. B. Joel's XI won by 8 wickets.
- Border v S. B. Joel's XI, Jan Smuts Ground, East London, 31 January, 2 February 1925. Border 200 and 107 for 5; S. B. Joel's XI 311 for 4 declared. Drawn.
- South Africa v S. B. Joel's XI (fourth match), Old Wanderers, Johannesburg, 6, 7, 9, 10 February 1925. S. B. Joel's XI 239 and 164; South Africa 193 and 16 for no wicket. Drawn.

There was no play on the final day, when South Africa were chasing a target of 211 to square the series. Nupen took 3 for 73 and 5 for 51. The highest scorer on either side was Jack Russell, with 80 in S. B. Joel's XI's first innings.

- Orange Free State v S. B. Joel's XI, Ramblers Cricket Club Ground, Bloemfontein, 13, 14, 16 February 1925. S. B. Joel's XI 442; Orange Free State 384. Drawn.
- South Africa v S. B. Joel's XI (fifth match), St George's Park, Port Elizabeth, 20, 21, 23, 24 February 1925. South Africa 183 and 200; S. B. Joel's XI 94 and 268. South Africa won by 21 runs.

The highest scorer on either side was Bob Catterall, with 86 in South Africa's second innings. For South Africa, Hall took eight wickets, Nupen seven; for S. B. Joel's XI, Geary took eight wickets, Kennedy seven. The series ended 2–2.

== Leading players ==
The series was dominated by four bowlers. For South Africa, Nupen took 37 wickets despite missing the third match, and Hall took 27. For S. B. Joel's XI, Geary took 32 wickets, and Kennedy 21. The only two centuries were scored in the second match.
