= List of German place names in South Africa =

The following is an incomplete list of German place names in South Africa. The namesakes (if there are any) of places shown in brackets.

== List ==
- Amaliënstein (Amalie von Stein)
- Anhalt-Schmidt, the former name of Haarlem, Western Cape.
- Berlin (Berlin)
- Braunschweig (Braunschweig)
- Breidbach (Breitbach)
- Cassel (Kassel)
- Döhne (Jacob Ludwig Döhne)
- Frankfort, Eastern Cape (Frankfurt)
- Frankfort, Free State (Frankfurt)
- Friemersheim (Freimersheim)
- Glückstadt (Glückstadt)
- Hamburg (Hamburg)
- Hanover (Hanover)
- Heidelberg, former name of Bethulie
- Heidelberg, Gauteng (Heidelberg)
- Heidelberg, Western Cape (Heidelberg)
- Hermannsburg (Hermannsburg)
- Lüneburg (Lüneburg)
- Muden (Müden)
- New Germany, KwaZulu-Natal, formerly Neu-Deutschland
- New Hanover (Hanover)
- Potsdam (Potsdam)
- Spandau Kop, Graaff-Reinet (Spandau)
- Steinkopf (Dr Steinkopf)
- Stutterheim (Richard von Stutterheim)
- Wartburg (Wartburg)
- Wupperthal (Wuppertal)
