= Pinneberg (electoral district) =

Federal electoral district of Germany

7 Pinneberg
- Electoral district for the Bundestag
- Pinneberg in 2025
- State: Schleswig-Holstein
- Population: 316,100 (2019)
- Electorate: 238,388 (2021)
- Major settlements: Elmshorn; Pinneberg; Wedel
- Area: 664.3 km^{2}

Current electoral district
- Created: 1949
- Party: CDU
- Member: Daniel Kölbl
- Elected: 2025

Pinneberg is an electoral constituency (German: Wahlkreis) represented in the Bundestag. It elects one member via first-past-the-post voting. Under the current constituency numbering system, it is designated as constituency 7. It is located in southwestern Schleswig-Holstein, coterminous with the Pinneberg district.

Pinneberg was created for the inaugural 1949 federal election. From 2021 to 2025, it was represented by Ralf Stegner of the Social Democratic Party (SPD). Since 2025 it has been represented by Daniel Kölbl of the CDU.

== Geography ==
Pinneberg is located in southwestern Schleswig-Holstein. As of the 2021 federal election, it is coterminous with the Pinneberg district. This includes the small Heligoland islands (1.7 km^{2}, population 1,309) off the North Sea coast.

== History ==
Pinneberg was created in 1949. Until 1965, it was constituency 12 in the number system; from 1965 to 1976 it was constituency 9. Since 1976, it has been constituency 7. It has been coterminous with the Pinneberg district since its creation.

== Members ==
The constituency was held by the Social Democratic Party (SPD) during the inaugural term of the Bundestag, during which time it was represented by Anni Krahnstöver. It was won by the Christian Democratic Union (CDU) in 1953, and represented by Wilhelm Goldhagen (until 1961) and Rolf Bremer. In 1969, it was won again by the SPD, and represented in turn by Hans-Ulrich Brand and Hermann P. Reiser, who each served for a single term. Party fellow Reinhard Ueberhorst represented it from 1976 until 1983, when it was won by Ingrid Roitzsch of the CDU. She was succeeded by Gert Willner from 1994 to 1998 before the constituency was again won by the SPD. Ernst Dieter Rossmann represented it for two terms. Ole Schröder of the CDU served from 2005 to 2017, before being succeeded by party fellow Michael von Abercron in 2017. Ralf Stegner was elected for the SPD in 2021.

With the exception of the 1949 election, Pinneberg can be considered Germany's bellwether constituency, having always voted for the party that would win the chancellorship. (In 1969, 1976 and 1980 elections, CDU-CSU came first, but SPD formed the government.)

Election	Member	Party	%
1949	Anni Krahnstöver	SPD	36.3
1953	Wilhelm Goldhagen	CDU	38.9
1957	Wilhelm Goldhagen	CDU	45.8
1961	Wilhelm Goldhagen	CDU	41.4
1965	Rolf Bremer	CDU	50.0
1969	Hans-Ulrich Brand	SPD	46.3
1972	Hermann P. Reiser	SPD	51.3
1976	Reinhard Ueberhorst	SPD	46.2
1980	Reinhard Ueberhorst	SPD	48.6
1983	Ingrid Roitzsch	CDU	49.5
1987	Ingrid Roitzsch	CDU	45.9
1990	Ingrid Roitzsch	CDU	43.9
1994	Gert Willner	CDU	44.7
1998	Ernst Dieter Rossmann	SPD	47.9
2002	Ernst Dieter Rossmann	SPD	46.4
2005	Ole Schröder	CDU	44.2
2009	Ole Schröder	CDU	40.8
2013	Ole Schröder	CDU	45.4
2017	Michael von Abercron	CDU	39.7
2021	Ralf Stegner	SPD	31.2
2025	Daniel Kölbl	CDU	31.8

== Election results ==
=== 2025 election ===
Federal election (2025): Pinneberg
Notes:	Blue background denotes the winner of the electorate vote. Pink background denotes a candidate elected from their party list. Yellow background denotes an electorate win by a list member, or other incumbent. A ✓ or ✗ denotes status of any incumbent, win or lose respectively.						
Party	Candidate	Votes	%	±%	Party votes	%	±%
CDU	Daniel Kölbl	63,231	31.8	▲5.6	57,532	28.9	▲6.8
SPD	✗ Ralf Stegner	49,714	25.0	▼6.2	40,326	20.2	▼9.0
AfD	Burghard Schalhorn	30,417	15.3	▲8.9	31,098	15.6	▲8.7
Greens	Ann Hahn	25,395	12.8	▼4.1	28,967	14.5	▼3.5
Left	Karin Kunkel	12,683	6.4	▲3.4	15,064	7.6	▲4.2
FDP	Philip Rösch	7,674	3.9	▼7.1	10,086	5.1	▼8.4
BSW					7,122	3.6	New
SSW	Thorsten Falke	4,617	2.3	▲0.9	3,976	2.0	▲0.7
Volt	Scarlett Hurna	2,422	1.2	New	2,016	1.0	▲0.8
PARTEI					1,360	0.7	▼0.3
FW	Henning Schwennicke	2,190	1.1	▼0.2	1,313	0.7	▼0.3
BD	Enno Kirchner	756	0.4	New	385	0.2	New
MLPD					47	<0.1	0.0
Informal votes		1,213			1,020		
Total valid votes		199,099			199,292		
Turnout		200,312	84.6	▲4.3			
CDU gain from SPD	Majority	13,517	6.8	N/A			

=== 2021 election ===
Federal election (2021): Pinneberg
Notes:	Blue background denotes the winner of the electorate vote. Pink background denotes a candidate elected from their party list. Yellow background denotes an electorate win by a list member, or other incumbent. A ✓ or ✗ denotes status of any incumbent, win or lose respectively.						
Party	Candidate	Votes	%	±%	Party votes	%	±%
SPD	Ralf Stegner	59,298	31.2	▲0.9	55,693	29.3	▲6.3
CDU	✗ Michael von Abercron	49,710	26.2	▼13.5	42,057	22.1	▼12.2
Greens	Jens Herrndorff	32,109	16.9	▲8.6	34,291	18.0	▲6.6
FDP	Philipp Rösch	20,737	10.9	▲3.2	25,663	13.5	▲0.2
AfD	Joachim Schneider	12,141	6.4	▼1.5	13,080	6.9	▼1.7
Left	Cornelia Möhring	5,659	3.0	▼3.1	6,363	3.3	▼3.7
dieBasis	Sabine Lehmann	2,895	1.5		2,389	1.3	
SSW	Claudia Edmund	2,622	1.4		2,527	1.3	
Tierschutzpartei					2,320	1.2	
FW	Kathrin Arbeck	2,380	1.3		1,731	0.9	▲0.4
PARTEI	Erkan Inak	2,352	1.2		1,805	0.9	▼0.2
Team Todenhöfer					799	0.4	
Volt					457	0.2	
V-Partei3					208	0.1	
ÖDP					202	0.1	▼0.1
NPD					188	0.1	▼0.1
Humanists					182	0.1	
du.					127	0.1	
LKR	Rainer Urban	166	0.1		108	0.1	
DKP					59	0.0	
MLPD					21	0.0	0.0
Informal votes		1,443			1,242		
Total valid votes		190,069			190,270		
Turnout		191,512	80.3	▲1.6			
SPD gain from CDU	Majority	9,588	5.0				

=== 2017 election ===
Federal election (2017): Pinneberg
Notes:	Blue background denotes the winner of the electorate vote. Pink background denotes a candidate elected from their party list. Yellow background denotes an electorate win by a list member, or other incumbent. A ✓ or ✗ denotes status of any incumbent, win or lose respectively.						
Party	Candidate	Votes	%	±%	Party votes	%	±%
CDU	Michael von Abercron	73,816	39.7	▼5.7	63,863	34.3	▼6.3
SPD	Ernst Dieter Rossmann	56,460	30.3	▼5.8	42,729	22.9	▼8.3
Greens	Bernd Möbius	15,379	8.3	▲1.9	21,336	11.4	▲2.8
AfD	Joachim Schneider	14,729	7.9	▲4.1	15,977	8.6	▲3.8
FDP	Olaf Klampe	14,441	7.8	▲5.9	24,735	13.3	▲7.7
Left	Cornelia Möhring	11,270	6.1	▲2.1	13,111	7.0	▲2.0
PARTEI					2,200	1.2	
FW					954	0.5	▲0.1
BGE					541	0.3	
NPD					446	0.2	▼0.5
ÖDP					428	0.2	
MLPD					52	0.0	0.0
Informal votes		1,620			1,343		
Total valid votes		186,095			186,372		
Turnout		187,715	78.7	▲2.7			
CDU hold	Majority	17,356	9.4	▲0.1			

=== 2013 election ===
Federal election (2013): Pinneberg
Notes:	Blue background denotes the winner of the electorate vote. Pink background denotes a candidate elected from their party list. Yellow background denotes an electorate win by a list member, or other incumbent. A ✓ or ✗ denotes status of any incumbent, win or lose respectively.						
Party	Candidate	Votes	%	±%	Party votes	%	±%
CDU	✓ Ole Schröder	80,483	45.4	▲4.6	72,006	40.6	▲7.5
SPD	Ernst Dieter Rossmann	64,006	36.1	▲4.3	55,371	31.2	▲4.9
Greens	Valerie Wilms	11,324	6.4	▼3.0	15,291	8.6	▼3.5
Left	Cornelia Möhring	6,985	3.9	▼2.9	8,910	5.0	▼2.7
AfD	Sebastian Hausmann	6,766	3.8		8,479	4.8	
FDP	Olaf Klampe	3,303	1.9	▼8.0	9,863	5.6	▼11.0
Pirates	Birgitt Piepgras	3,225	1.8		3,370	1.9	▼0.2
NPD	Ingo Stawitz	1,260	0.7	▼0.4	1,319	0.7	▼0.3
Tierschutzpartei					1,271	0.7	
FW					786	0.4	
Rentner					665	0.4	▼0.5
MLPD					42	0.0	0.0
Informal votes		1,703			1,682		
Total valid votes		177,352			177,373		
Turnout		179,055	76.0	▲0.3			
CDU hold	Majority	16,477	9.3	▲0.3			

=== 2009 election ===
Federal election (2009): Pinneberg
Notes:	Blue background denotes the winner of the electorate vote. Pink background denotes a candidate elected from their party list. Yellow background denotes an electorate win by a list member, or other incumbent. A ✓ or ✗ denotes status of any incumbent, win or lose respectively.						
Party	Candidate	Votes	%	±%	Party votes	%	±%
CDU	✓ Ole Schröder	70,458	40.8	▼3.5	57,203	33.1	▼3.8
SPD	Ernst Dieter Rossmann	54,950	31.8	▼11.0	45,540	26.3	▼11.1
FDP	Olaf Klampe	17,018	9.8	▲6.2	28,640	16.6	▲6.3
Greens	Valerie Wilms	16,143	9.3	▲4.4	20,978	12.1	▲3.1
Left	Klaus-Dieter Brügmann	11,794	6.8	▲3.5	13,412	7.8	▲3.4
Pirates					3,659	2.1	
NPD	Ingo Stawitz	1,912	1.1	▲0.1	1,743	1.0	0.0
Rentner					1,571	0.9	
Independent	Rolf Hoffmann	529	0.3				
DVU					193	0.1	
MLPD					56	0.0	0.0
Informal votes		3,384			3,193		
Total valid votes		172,804			172,995		
Turnout		176,188	75.6	▼6.0			
CDU hold	Majority	15,508	9.0	▲7.5			

=== 2005 election ===
Federal election (2005):Pinneberg
Notes:	Blue background denotes the winner of the electorate vote. Pink background denotes a candidate elected from their party list. Yellow background denotes an electorate win by a list member, or other incumbent. A ✓ or ✗ denotes status of any incumbent, win or lose respectively.						
Party	Candidate	Votes	%	±%	Party votes	%	±%
CDU	Ole Schröder	80,935	44.2	▲3.2	67,534	36.8	▲1.3
SPD	✗ Ernst Dieter Rossmann	78,236	42.8	▼3.6	68,570	37.4	▼4.1
Greens	Rainder Steenblock	9,118	5.0	▼0.8	16,610	9.1	▼1.2
FDP	Matthias Scheffler	6,743	3.7	▼1.5	18,796	10.3	▲1.9
Left	Claus-Peter Matetzki	6,142	3.4	▲2.3	8,043	4.4	▲3.2
Familie					1,906	1.0	
NPD	Ingo Stawitz	1,789	1.0		1,770	1.0	▲0.8
MLPD					93	0.1	
Informal votes		2,646			2,287		
Total valid votes		182,963			183,322		
Turnout		185,609	81.7	▼2.0			
SPD gain from CDU	Majority	2,699	1.4				
