= Dohne =

Dohne or Döhne may refer to:

- Döhne, a South African agricultural research station
- Stutterheim, formerly named Dohne, a town in the Border region of the Eastern Cape province, South Africa
- Jacob Ludwig Döhne, a German missionary to South Africa, after whom the above were named
