= Johan de Fin =

Chamberlain to Franz Josef

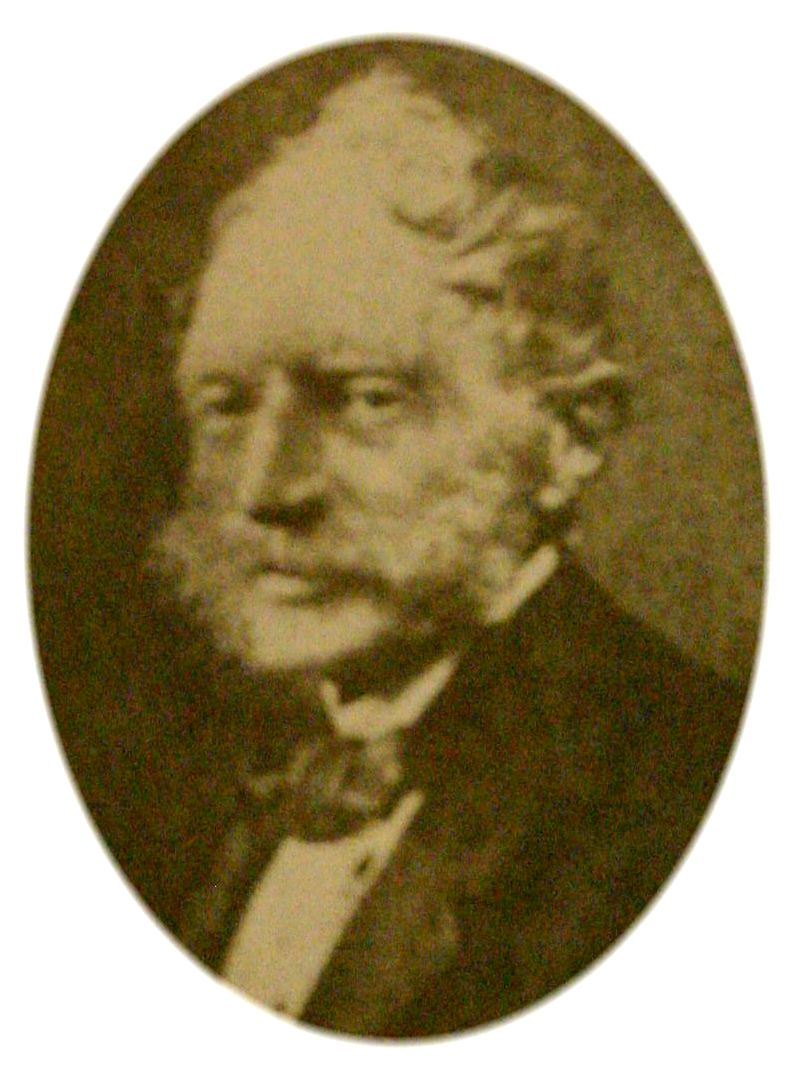

Rt. Hon. Field Marshal Baron Johan de Fin (1800–1887), was Chamberlain to Franz Josef, Emperor of Austria, an officer in the British German Legion, and Conservator of Forests in the Eastern Cape.

== Biography ==
Johan de Fin, also known as Jean de Fin, was born 15 September 1800 in Prague.

De Fin married Marie Eleonore d'Auersperg on 15 August 1827.

De Fin came to Kaffraria in 1857 with the British German Legion, and founded the German Legion town of Hamburg at the mouth of the Keiskamma River. Soon after the re-incorporation of British Kaffraria in 1865 he was appointed as Forest Ranger and continued serving in this post until about 1880. He lived at Rabula and in Keiskammahoek, where he acted as conservator and magistrate's clerk.

De Fin died on 15 April 1887 in Keiskammahoek. An oak tree at Stutterheim which was planted in 1838 was named after de Fin in 1934.
