= Carl von Brandis =

Captain Carl von Brandis
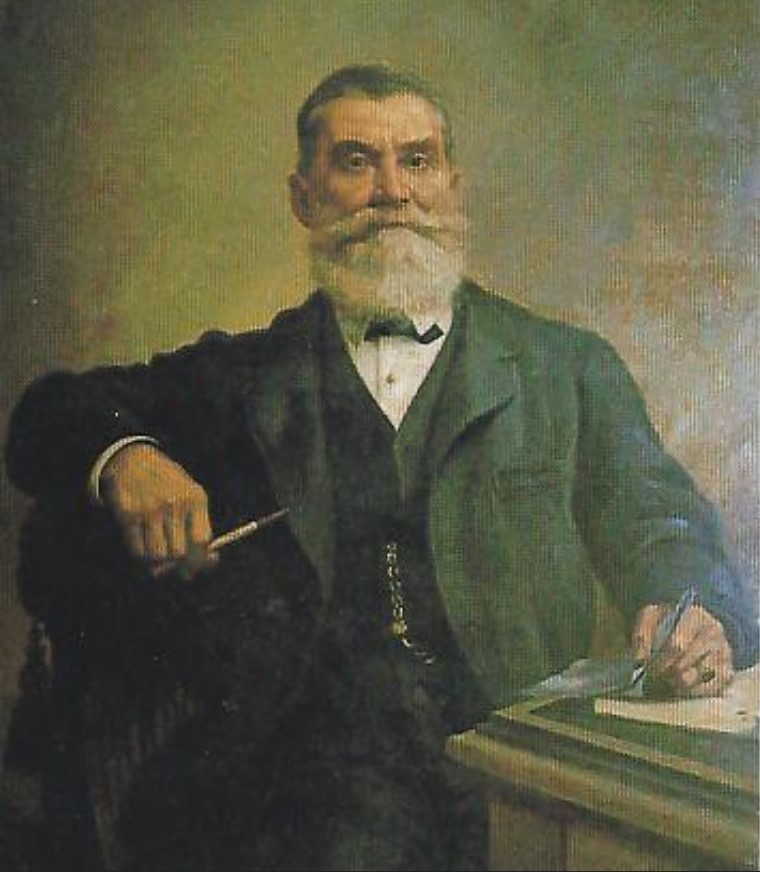
- Born: 1827; Burgdorf, Hannover, Germany
- Died: 20 June 1903 (aged 75–76); Johannesburg, Transvaal Colony, South Africa
- Occupations: Prussian Cavalry Officer; Mining Commissioner; Chief Landdrost
- Spouses: Matilda Hṻhne (m. 1856-57); Jane Margaret Hohne (m.1858)

Captain Carl von Brandis (1827 – 20 June 1903) was a cavalry officer in Austrian and British service, and later a mining commissioner and landdrost (magistrate) in the South African Republic (Transvaal). He is most commonly known for being the Witwatersrand's first mining commissioner and Johannesburg's first landdrost.

== Early life ==
Carl von Brandis was born into a military family from Lower Saxony. Both his father and grandfather served under the Duke of Wellington in the Iberian peninsula during the Peninsula War and later at the Battle of Waterloo. Following a family tradition, von Brandis started his military career in 1842, training for two years at the Hanoverian Cadet Institute.

== Military career ==
After completing his military training, he joined the Austrian Army and took part in the First Italian War of Independence. Von Brandis then met Baron Richard von Stutterheim, who was recruiting men for a British German Legion, part of the British Army's recruits for the Crimean War. He became a captain in the Legion during 1856 in 2nd and 5th Light Infantry. He did not see fighting in the Crimean War; the fighting ended before the Legion could be deployed. Its members settled in the Eastern Cape in 1857 and the Legion was disbanded in 1859.

== South African career ==
After being disbanded, von Brandis and his wife settled in the Orange Free State, where he became its Chief Constable and a private secretary to President Marthinus Wessel Pretorius. He was appointed to the position of Landdrost of Winburg in 1864. In 1864, the couple left for the South African Republic, where he became a prosecutor and Landdrost's clerk at Wakkerstroom. By 1876 he was the Commandant of Lydenburg, and in 1879 he became Landdrost of Winburg. He was appointed Chief Clerk in the office of the State Attorney E. J. P. Jorissen. On 18 September 1886, he was promoted to Mining Commissioner and was sent to the Witwatersrand goldfields. In November 1886, von Brandis was appointed as Chief Landdrost by President Paul Kruger when the Witwatersrand goldfields were proclaimed. During the Second Boer War 1899–1902, he remained in Johannesburg and, towards the end of the war when the British occupied Johannesburg, he was appointed Registrar of Births and Deaths by the British administrator Alfred Milner.

== Marriage ==
Von Brandis married Matilda Hṻhne in Hannover on 28 January 1856. The marriage lasted just over a year, before she and their only child died on 13 May 1857. In 1858, he met and married Jane Margaret Hohne in Cape Town, Cape Colony.

== Death ==
He died on 20 June 1903 at his home in Johannesburg and was buried in Braamfontein Cemetery. His legacy was honoured in the form of a street in Johannesburg and a statue on the corner of Von Brandis and Pritchard Streets, in front of the Supreme Court commemorating the first Johannesburg magistrate.

Link to gravestone in Braamfontein cemetery.
