= Braunschweig, South Africa =

Braunschweig
- Location within Eastern Cape Location within South Africa
- Coordinates: 32.785°S 27.369°E
- Country: South Africa
- Province: Eastern Cape
- District: Amathole
- Municipality: Amahlathi
- Elevation: 426 m (1,398 ft)
- Time zone: UTC+2 (SAST)
- Area code: 043

Braunschweig is a small town in the Eastern Cape province, South Africa.

Braunschweig, situated in the former district of King William's Town, is one of the villages that were established after the arrival of the German Legion and German settlers in British Kaffraria in and after 1857. It is represented today solely by a Lutheran church complex consisting of the neo-Gothic church, a parsonage and a school building, surrounded by veld. The original church building established by the Lutherans in 1866–7 was a simple structure under thatch, while the present church was built in 1904.

The St Peter's Lutheran Church was closed in September 1985, when the apartheid government sold the land and the nearby farms to the Ciskei government. Before then, all the farms around it were owned by Germans who attended the church. The congregation built a new church in Komga, which was opened in 1989.
