= Potsdam, New York (disambiguation) =

Potsdam, New York, relates to two locations in St. Lawrence County, New York:

- Potsdam, New York
- Potsdam (village), New York, in the town of Potsdam; site of the State University of New York at Potsdam

== See also ==
- Potsdam (disambiguation)
