= Forest conservation in South Africa =

This article deals with forest conservation in South Africa.

== History ==
Although fairly considerable areas of forest or bush have disappeared since colonization as a result of excessive logging and grazing, indigenous cultivation and fires, there does not seem to be any reason to believe that the country was ever, on the whole, heavily forested during the present geological period. In 1950, forests covered about 3.7 percent of South Africa's total area.

Since the early days of European settlement in the Cape, the indigenous forests of the Southern Cape have been used as a seemingly inexhaustible source of wood and fuel. From 1652, when Jan van Riebeeck landed in the Cape, until the 1880s, the forests and the wildlife they supported were stripped down in much the same way as those in the United States or Australia, with little thought given to the sustainability.

=== Colony needs ===
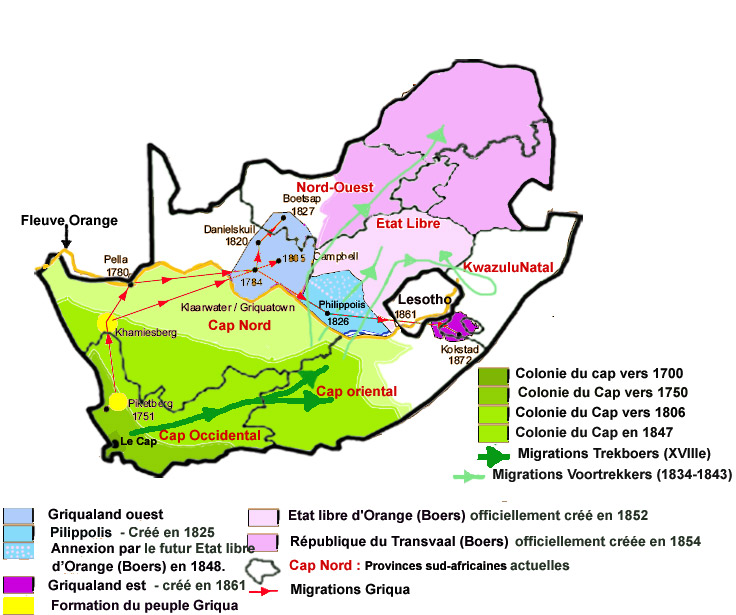
Map of South Africa showing the evolution of the borders of the Cape Colony from 1700 to 1847 as well as the migration of Griquas and Boers in the 19th century

When setting up the Cape Dutch colony in 1652, around Table Bay, Jan van Riebeeck found a forest of tall trees inland (six miles away) so difficult to exploit that he agreed it would be easier to bring in from Amsterdam or Batavia. Baptized in 1653, Hout Bay will provide access to forests that are lacking in the colony not far from Kaapstad. In the time of Simon van der Stel, they were already in such a state of depletion that three farmer-sawyers were appointed to be able to maintain and exploit the forest. Successive governors Simon and Willem Adriaan van der Stel also planted thousands of oaks: thirty thousand oaks were thus imported from Holland in 1679 and planted in particular in the region of Stellenbosch (hence the name).

Around 1776, a logging center was established at George's location, which heralded a century of plundering of the surrounding forests. An improved road between Swellendam and George sees ever-increasing numbers of settlers and adventurers eager to take part in the timber boom. The perception is that of an unlimited resource, leading to excessively wasteful practices where only wood of suitable quality and size are chosen and taken away, and the majority of cut trees are simply left to rot.

In 1778, Governor Joachim van Plettenberg, who inspected the region, was appalled by the destruction. As a result, Johann Fredrick Meeding was made resident at Plettenberg Bay with the aim of establishing some form of control over the cuts. Meeding performed his duties diligently, and his position survived a number of successive changes of government, which followed the British occupation of the Cape in 1795. Even so, no new conservation measures were introduced, and when Graaff-Reinet was founded in 1786, the timber boom resumed with the wholesale cutting of forests between George and Knysna, with George's official foundation in 1811 worsening the destruction.

The annexation of the Cape by Great Britain in 1806 put an end to the stammering intentions of reforestation by the Batavian Republic.

=== Royal Navy needs ===
A dockyard was built in Simon's Town in 1743, taken over by the Royal Navy in 1790.

George Macartney adopts a policy of using wood from the Plettenberg Bay and Simon's Bay forests for the needs of the Navy. It is anticipated that timber extraction would be concentrated around Plettenberg Bay simply because it could be easily shipped from there to Kaapstad. This stimulates interest in forests, as well as a very nominal form of protection. However, it would seem that many irregular slaughters took place between 1795 and 1801. In April 1800, Andrew Barnard restricted the use of certain parts of the forest to government use only. Two months later, the Landdrost of Swellendam assesses the damage caused to the forests. In January 1801, Governor Sir George Yonge issued a proclamation authorizing the appointment of "Permanent Commissioners" with full powers to oversee, direct and manage the various forests in the area of George, Knysna, Plettenberg Bay, Mossel Bay, Algoa Bay and also all other forests in the colony.

At the mouth of the Knysna, the Briton George Rex, aware of the enormous commercial potential of the region, bought around 1804 the Melkhoutkraal farm, created around 1770 by the colonial government. He immediately pressured the government to establish a port there, for the export of timber from the evergreen forests of Knysna. He will eventually employ up to 400 slaves to harvest this wood. The banks are full of large trees that are cut and transported to the new town of Knysna (founded by Rex), by a ship built by Rex. In 1831, a new brig of 139 tons Knysna was built by Rex almost entirely in Stinkwood (Ocotea bullata) (the slipway itself is of the same essence) and sails through the Heads with its first cargo of timber bound for Table Bay in Cape Town.

The American Embargo Act of 1807 followed by the Non-Intercourse Act of 1809 forced the United Kingdom to find a new source of mast supply, and incursions were made to exploit Cape stinkwood (Ocotea bullata) and Real yellowwood (Podocarpus latifolius). Widdringtonia wallichii will also be exploited.

Timber extraction by the Royal Navy to meet the needs of the Simon's Town shipyard is an additional burden on forests, a situation that lasts until 1825 when iron will be increasingly used in shipbuilding. The withdrawal of marine workers led to an immediate occupation of the evacuated areas by new loggers.

The beginning of the Great Trek in 1836 provoked new waves of Langkloof cutters to invade the Tsitsikamma forests in the Humansdorp region. To make matters worse, the government decided in 1846 to sell the managed forests into agricultural plots. Of the remaining forest, only a narrow strip, stretching between the Keurbooms and Kaaimans rivers, is under state control, and the local magistrate issues felling permits to loggers with the aim of collecting as much income as possible. In 1847, the situation becomes so critical that all the Crown forests are declared closed. A Forest Conservator is appointed, assisted by 4 rangers. This protection is of short duration and in 1856 the forests are reopened.

=== Harison ===
The second Conservator of Forests was appointed at this time, a retired army officer, Captain Christopher Harison, a man with no forestry training but with remarkable aptitude for his new career. He has become familiar with European forestry and adopted the practice of sectional logging which leads to better control and a considerable reduction in waste. He was also an outspoken critic of the alienation of Crown forests and it is largely through his efforts that this practice has been stopped. Colonial botanist Karl Wilhelm Ludwig Pappe issues dire warnings of the extent of the destruction and becomes another voice supporting the growing climate favorable to forest conservation. The appointment of Field Marshal Baron Johan de Fin as Conservator of Forests at Keiskammahoek followed in 1865. Despite the warnings, things went much the same way until the great forest fire of February 1869 in which large parts of the forest between George and the Bloukrans River were completely destroyed. The matter was raised in Parliament and a commission consisting of Captain Harison and Thomas Bain was appointed. Following this, Captain Harison was appointed Conservator of Knysna Region Forests in 1874. His work was hampered by the timber requirements of the railway line at Kimberley and by the short-lived gold rush at Millwood in 1876.

=== De Vasselot ===
Comte Médéric de Vasselot de Régné (August 4, 1837 – April 23, 1919), a French-born forestry officer educated at the National School of Forestry in Nancy, France, was appointed Superintendent of Woods and Forests in South Africa in 1880.

De Vasselot's appointment as Superintendent of Woods and Forests followed in 1880. This was the first time a professional forester was appointed in charge, and was a watershed moment in South African forestry. For the first time, the authorities are convinced that a sound forestry policy is more important than the income from the exploitation. Details of the new management system were spelled out in the Forest Regulations of 1883. When de Vasselot left the Cape in 1891, the forests of George, Knysna and Tsitsikamma were managed on a scientific basis. Two important publications by de Vasselot were published in 1885: "Introduction to the Systematic Treatment of the Crown Forests of the Cape Colony" and a pamphlet on "Selection and Seasoning of Wood", were both translated into English by the Conservator of Transkeian Forests, A. W. Heywood. In 1898, Colin MacNaughton succeeded Heywood as conservator at Knysna, where he marked the first permanent sample plots in the forests to study indigenous tree communities, thus laying a valuable foundation for forest ecosystem research. McNaughton strongly believed that forests should be harvested for the benefit of the country, not for the benefit of the immediate population. In other words, trees should be seen as a national resource, and unrelated to the livelihoods of the communities that were exploiting the forest.

De Vasselot is commemorated in the Vasselot Nature Reserve surrounding Nature's Valley.

=== Mining wood ===
Mining for gold and coal leads to plantations of fast-growing eucalyptus and exotic acacia trees. On the other hand, the state reforestation program was mainly aimed at the production of softwood sawlogs, starting in 1939, about 6,400 ha were planted annually.

Area of land reserved for forests around 1950 (hectares):

- Indigenous forests: 252,628 ha
- Plantations (exotic species): 192,335 ha
- Desert dunes: 13,265 ha
- Non-forested areas (unsuitable or not available): 954,597 ha
- Available for afforestation: 132,466 ha

== Today ==
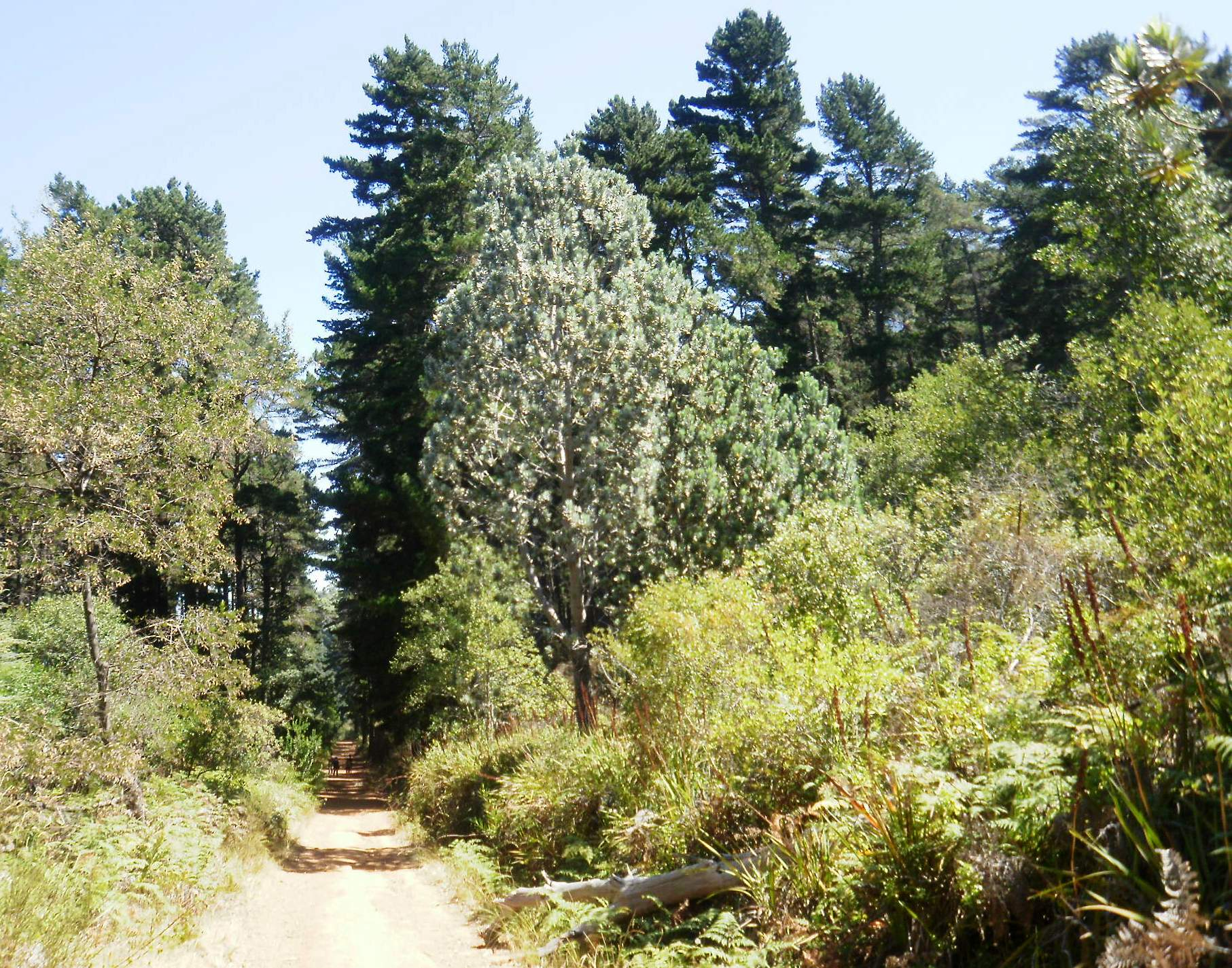
The Newlands Forest, with endangered indigenous Peninsula Granite Fynbos and large Silvertree in the background (in 2011).

Since 1994, South Africa has made significant efforts to promote forest conservation and sustainable forestry practices. The National Forest Act was enacted in 1998 to provide a legal framework for the sustainable management and conservation of forests in the country. It established the South African Forestry Company Limited (SAFCOL) as the custodian of state-owned forests and defined the roles and responsibilities of various stakeholders in forest management. In the same year, the National Veld and Forest Fire Act was introduced providing for the prevention and control of forest fires. It outlines regulations for fire management and firefighting efforts, and makes provision for compliance with environmental standards.

== See also ==
- List of forests of South Africa
- Environmental issues in South Africa
