= Ole Schröder =

German politician

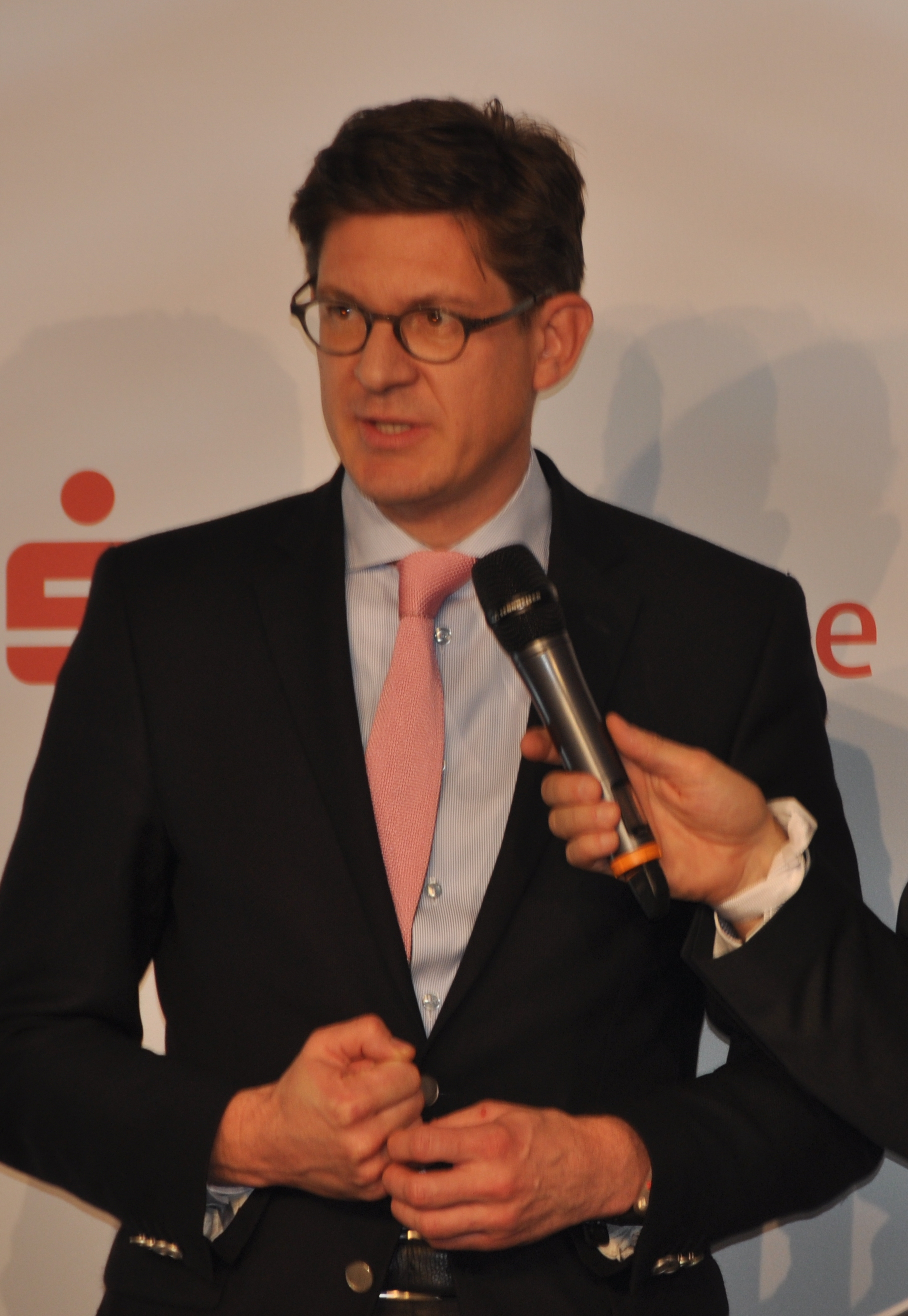

Parliamentary State Secretary for the Interior
- In office 28 October 2009 – 14 March 2018
- Minister: Hans-Peter Friedrich; Thomas de Maizière
- Preceded by: Peter Altmaier
- Succeeded by: Stephan Mayer

Member of the Bundestag for Pinneberg
- In office 18 September 2005 – 24 October 2017
- Preceded by: Ernst Dieter Rossmann
- Succeeded by: Michael von Abercron

Personal details
- Born: 27 August 1971 (age 55) Rellingen, West Germany
- Party: CDU
- Spouse: Kristina Schröder
- Children: 2
- Education: University of Hamburg; Stellenbosch University
- Occupation: Politician

Ole Schröder (born 27 August 1971) is a German politician and member of the CDU. From 2009 until 2018, he served as Parliamentary State Secretary in the German Federal Ministry of the Interior.

== Career ==
=== Early career ===
Between 2001 and 2009, Schröder worked as a lawyer with law firm White & Case in Hamburg.

=== Member of the German Parliament, 2002-2017 ===
Schröder first became a member of the Bundestag following the 2002 federal elections. Between 2002 and 2009, he served as a member of the Committee for the Scrutiny of Elections, Immunity and the Rules of Procedure. A member of the Budget Committee between 2005 and 2009, he served as the CDU/CSU parliamentary group's rapporteur on the budgets of the Federal Ministry of Family Affairs, Senior Citizens, Women and Youth (BMFSFJ) and the Federal Ministry of Justice (BMJ). During that time, he was also the Deputy Chairman of the Parliamentary Friendship Group for Relations with the States of the Southern Caucasus (Armenia, Azerbaijan, Georgia). From 2007, Schröder led the Bundestag group of CDU parliamentarians from Schleswig-Holstein.

From 2009, Schröder served as Parliamentary State Secretary in the German Federal Ministry of the Interior under ministers Thomas de Maizière (2009-2011, 2013–2018) and Hans-Peter Friedrich (2011–2013) in the second and third cabinets of Chancellor Angela Merkel. In this capacity, he is in charge of information technology and sport.

In the negotiations to form a Grand Coalition of the Christian Democrats (CDU together with the Bavarian CSU) and the Social Democrats (SPD) following the 2013 federal elections, Schröder was part of the CDU/CSU delegation in the working group on internal and legal affairs, led by Hans-Peter Friedrich and Thomas Oppermann.

=== Return to the private sector ===
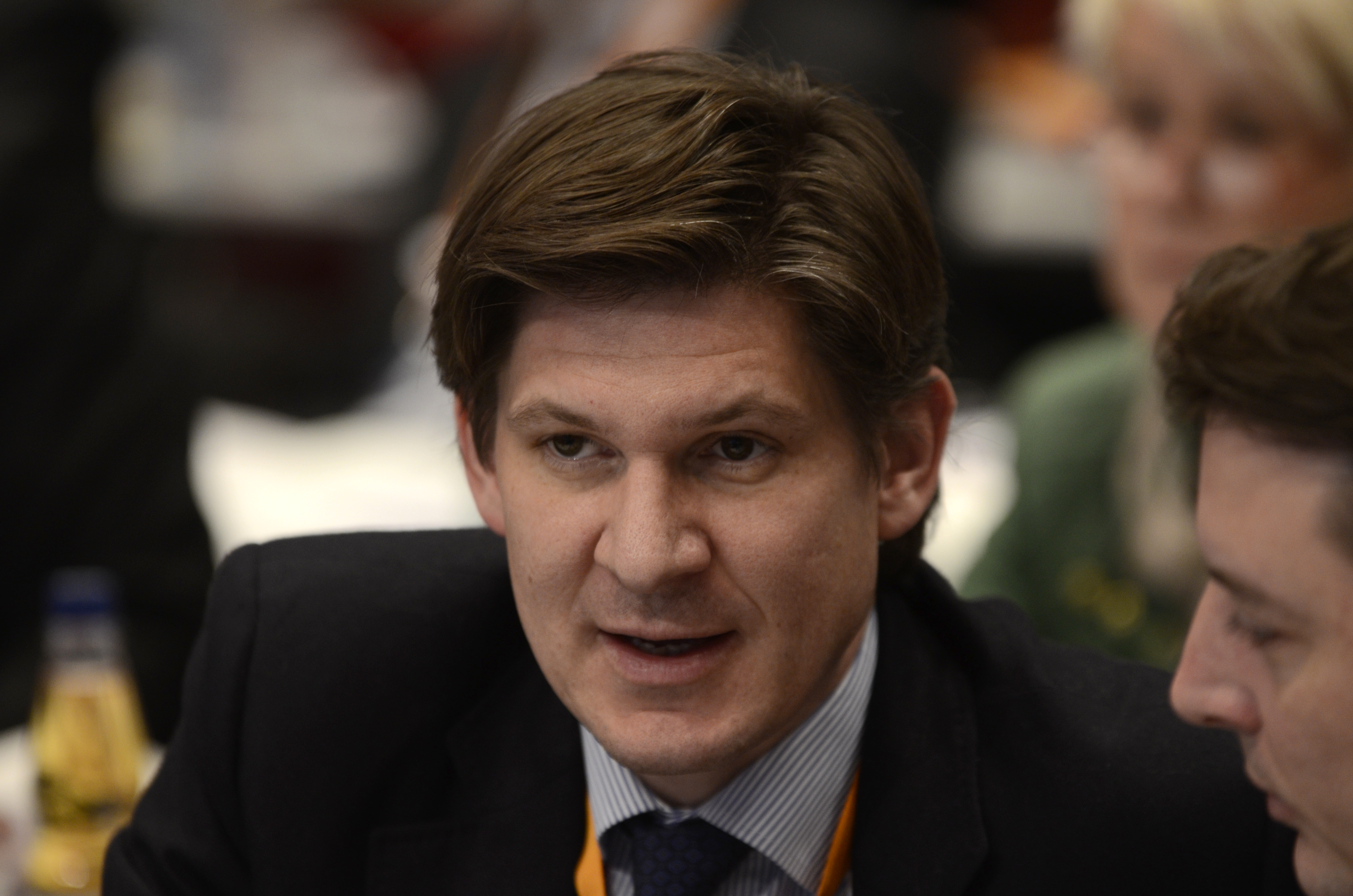
Schröder in 2012

Following a similar decision of his wife, Schröder announced in June 2016 that he would not stand in the 2017 federal elections but instead resign from active politics by the end of the parliamentary term. He has been working as a consultant for KPMG since 2018. In 2019, he was appointed to the board of Schufa.

== Other activities ==
- Center for International Peace Operations (ZIF), Deputy Chairman of the supervisory board (ex officio)
- German-South African Lawyers Association (DSJV), Member
- Porsche European Open, Member of the Board of Trustees
- German Foundation for International Legal Cooperation (IRZ), Member of the Board of Trustees (2005-2009)

== Political positions ==
In June 2017, Schröder voted against his parliamentary group's majority and in favor of Germany's introduction of same-sex marriage.

== Personal life ==
Schröder is married to Kristina Schröder, a fellow member of the Bundestag and former Federal Minister of Family Affairs, Senior Citizens, Women and Youth. Their first child was born in July 2011.
