= German South Africans =

European minority group in Africa

Regions with significant populations
- Lüneburg, Hermannsburg, Cape Town, Johannesburg and other large urban areas

Languages
- South African English; Afrikaans; German

Religion
- Roman Catholicism, Protestantism and Judaism

Related ethnic groups
- German Namibians; Afrikaners

German South Africans refers to South Africans who have full or partial German heritage.

A significant number of South Africans are descended from Germans. Most of these originally settled in the Cape Colony, but were absorbed into the Afrikaner community, because they had religious and ethnic similarities to the Dutch and French. German and Afrikaans (along with its parent language Dutch) are closely related Germanic languages. Later German migrants, especially during the Witwatersrand Gold Rush and the Natal German settlers of the 19th century, were integrated into English-speaking communities of Gauteng and Kwa-Zulu Natal.

== History ==
Hundreds of Germans emigrated to the Cape Colony during the Dutch rule between (1652–1806) and in the succeeding centuries. In 1652 the Dutch East India Company's established a supplies station at the Cape of Good Hope under the command of Jan van Riebeeck. The party was made up of 90 settlers, most of where were Dutch, but with a number of people were from Germany. In the 1680s, more German farmers and women arrived at Cape Colony. In 1691, the population was 1000 Europeans especially Dutch (85%), German (5%) & Huguenots (10%) and 400 slaves. From this point onwards the white population increased to about 1300 by the year 1700. About 4000 Germans immigrated to the Cape during the Dutch period, almost all of them males. They came from all German-speaking areas of Europe. The Germans who arrived at the Cape in the seventeenth century were not emigrants but worked for the Dutch East India Company, perhaps initially in Holland, and then were sent to the Cape. Similarly in 19th century a lot of Germans came to the region on missionary purposes and settled in the region, followed by British assisted emigration of Germans to the Eastern cape region further boosted their population.

== Natal German settlers: 1848 ==
A group of German settlers came to Natal in March 1848 on the ship Beta, under a private scheme arranged by a German Jewish businessman Jonas Bergtheil. He arrived in Natal in 1843 and established the Natal Cotton Company three years later. Bergtheil saw the potential of European settlement along the coast and approached the British colonial office for immigrants. When first the British and then the Bavarian governments rejected his plans, he turned to the Kingdom of Hanover for support. Thirty-five peasant families (about 188 people) from the Osnabrück-Bremen district accepted his offer and arrived in Natal on 23 March 1848. They were settled near Port Natal and called their new home Neu-Deutschland (New Germany). Bergtheil's cotton scheme failed after the first two crops were ravaged by bollworm. Furthermore, the ginning machinery he had ordered from England never arrived. The settlers soon abandoned cotton in favour of market gardening, and when their five-year contracts with Bergtheil ended many did not renew them. The initial years were a struggle for the settlers but gradually, with hard work, conditions improved. After about 10 years most had prospered and had been able to take ownership of their lands.

== Germans in South Africa ==
- Rudi Ball (1911–1975), German–South African Hall of Fame ice hockey player
- Helen Zille (born 1951), politician
- Harry Schwarz (1924–2010), activist
- Debbie Schäfer (born 1966), politician
- Lothar Neethling (1935–2005), Apartheid-era chief deputy commissioner
- James Barry Munnik Hertzog (1866–1942), politician
- Karl Wilhelm Posselt (1815–1885), missionary
- Karl Wilhelm Ludwig Pappe (1803–1862), physician and botanist
- Karl Ludwig Philipp Zeyher (1799–1858), botanist and insect collector
- Johann Franz Drège (1794–1881), botanist
- Baron von Ludwig (1784–1847), pharmacist and businessman
- Christian Ferdinand Friedrich Krauss (1812–1890), scientist and traveler
- Olaf Kölzig (born 1970), NHL goaltender for the Washington Capitals and Tampa Bay Lightning from 1989 to 2009.

== See also ==
- Germany–South Africa relations
- German Namibians
- List of German place names in South Africa
