= Germany–South Africa relations =

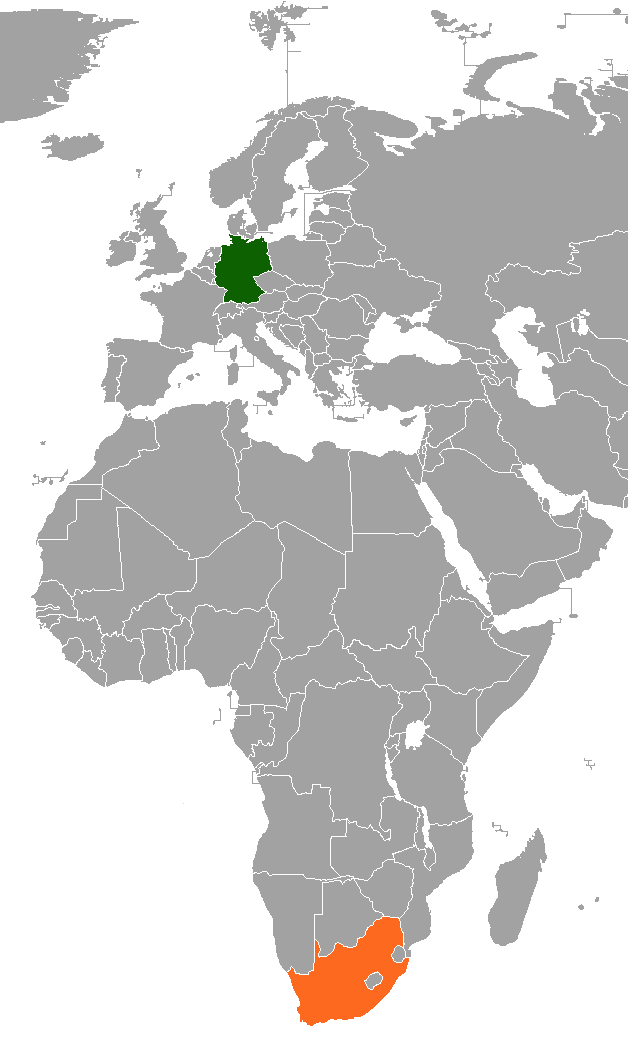

- Germany: South Africa

Germany–South Africa relations are the current and historical relations between the Federal Republic of Germany and the Republic of South Africa. Germany has an embassy in Pretoria and a consulate in Cape Town. South Africa has an embassy in Berlin and a consulate-general in Munich. Both countries are members of the United Nations.

== History ==
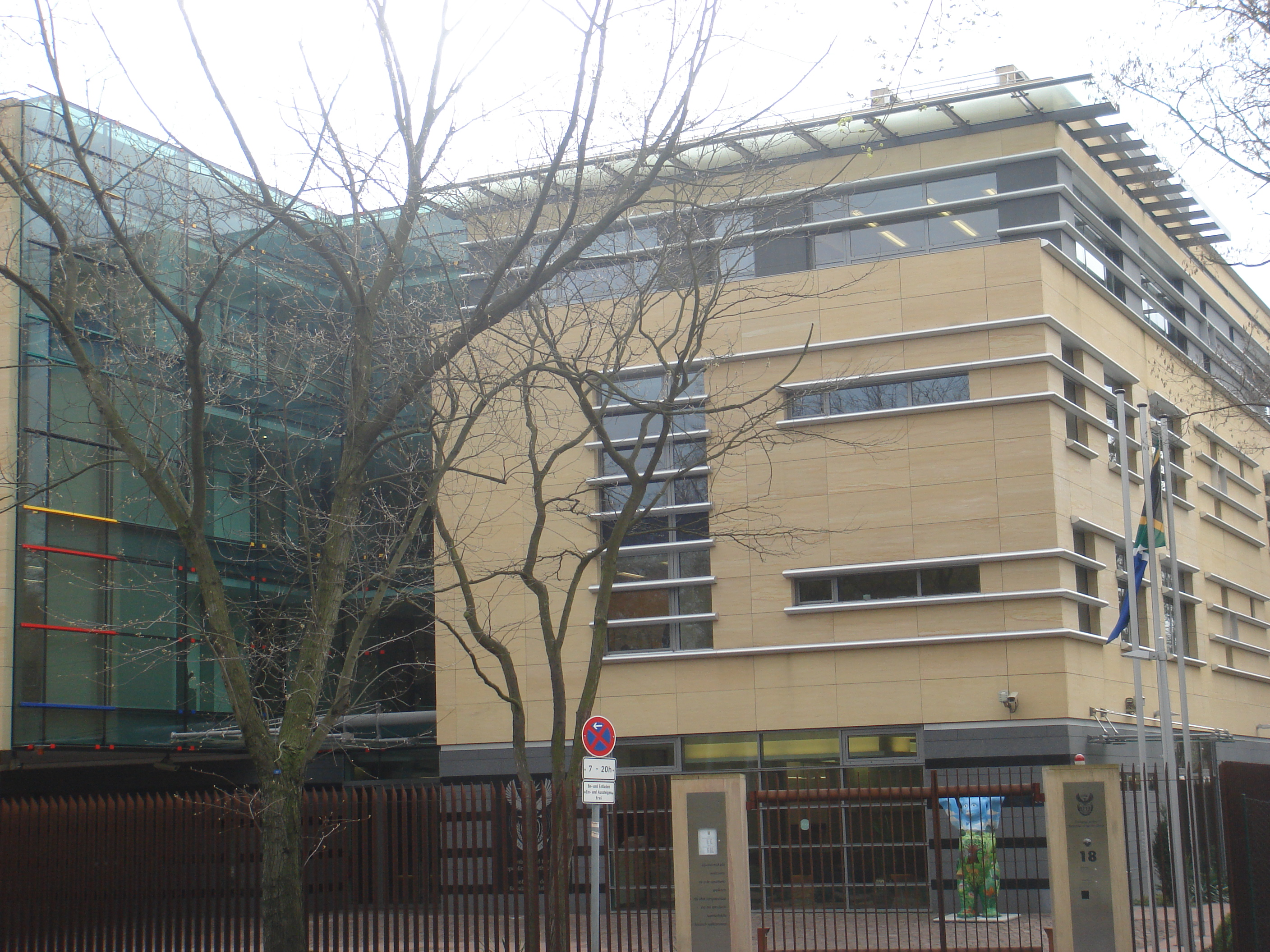
Embassy of South Africa in Berlin

=== World War I ===
In 1914, South Africa entered World War I on behalf of the British Empire against the German Empire. South Africa subsequently conquered German South-West Africa and occupied it until the independence of Namibia in 1990.

=== World War II ===
South Africa entered World War II on the side of the Allies against Nazi Germany and other Axis members. Many in South Africa, including the Afrikaner Ossewabrandwag (OB) movement, objected and sought to maintain South African neutrality during the conflict, if not enter the war on the side of Germany.

Members of the OB refused to enlist in the South African forces, and sometimes harassed servicemen in uniform. This erupted into open rioting in Johannesburg on 1 February 1941; 140 soldiers were seriously hurt.

More dangerous than this was the formation of the Stormjaers (English: Assault troops, literally stormhunters), a paramilitary wing of the OB similar to the Nazi Sturmabteilung. The nature of the Stormjaers was evidenced by the oath sworn by new recruits: "If I retreat, kill me. If I die, avenge me. If I advance, follow me" (Afrikaans: As ek omdraai, skiet my. As ek val, wreek my. As ek storm, volg my).

The Stormjaers engaged in sabotage against the Union government. They dynamited electrical power lines and railroads, and cut telegraph and telephone lines. These types of acts were going too far for most Afrikaners, and Malan ordered the National Party to break with the OB in 1942.

The Union government cracked down on the OB and the Stormjaers, placing thousands of them in internment camps for the duration of the war. Among the internees was future prime minister B. J. Vorster.

At the end of the war, the OB was absorbed into the National Party and ceased to exist as a separate body.

=== Germany and Apartheid South Africa ===
West Germany and Apartheid South Africa had very close ties, despite international sanctions. In 1951, a West German General Consulate was opened in Cape Town. In 1955, negotiations for a cultural agreement started. In 1956, a trial of 156 members of the opposition for high treason started. The South African prosecution sought Bonn's assistance in this important trial and received it without delay. One of the accused in this trial was Nelson Mandela.

During the 1960s and 1970s, West Germany and South Africa cooperated on nuclear development. In the early 1970s, West Germany had to withdraw its NATO ambassador as he had visited a South African uranium enrichment plant.

West German arms industry exported armour to South Africa, even after the 1977 official proclamation of the UN arms embargo. "Daimler is a vital partner of the South African war industry," concluded Abdul Minty, director of the international anti-Apartheid Organization in the late 1980s. "And if there is an international company, which could weaken the army of the apartheid state, it would be Daimler-Benz." Despite UN sanctions, Messerschmitt-Bölkow-Blohm exported helicopters to South Africa. To evade the sanctions in 1979 the South African company Atlantis Diesel Engines was established. Daimler-Benz had a 12% share in this company.

When more than 100 US enterprises withdrew from South Africa in mid-1987, West German companies expanded their trade and investments in South Africa.

=== Post-apartheid ===
Since the end of apartheid, relations between the two countries have increased. The German-South African Binational Commission has provided a framework for bilateral cooperation since 1996. During the 2022 Russian invasion of Ukraine President Ramaphosa of South Africa and German Chancellor Scholz publicly disagreed over their respective stances on the war; with Germany being strongly critical of the Russian invasion and South Africa advocating for a more neutral stance that was friendlier towards Russia.

== State visits ==
In October 2007, Federal Chancellor Angela Merkel visited South Africa to meet South African President Thabo Mbeki. In 2010, German foreign minister Guido Westerwelle visited South Africa and called the relationship "excellent" and "a strategic partnership" in both economics and world affairs.

== Trade ==
South Africa is Germany's largest trading partner in Africa. Trade between the two countries is very sizable and worth a total of EUR 12.6 billion (2008). In 2010, Germany was South Africa's fourth largest trading partner after China, the United States and Japan, with trade totaling 35.478 million rand (3.718 million Euro). South Africa continues to report massive trade deficits with Germany and recently South Africa's department of trade and industry brought this to the attention of the European union pending renegotiation of trade between the two nations.

== Immigration ==
South Africa is home to a large number of people of German descent. In late February 2019, The Local reported that 36,000 South Africans were living in Germany. Compared to South African communities in Canada (14,530), United Kingdom (117,225) and Australia (13,500).

== Resident diplomatic missions ==
- Germany has an embassy in Pretoria and a consulate-general in Cape Town.
- South Africa has an embassy in Berlin and a consulate-general in Munich.

== See also ==
- German-South African Lawyers Association
- Military history of South Africa during World War II
- South-West Africa Campaign
- Germans in South Africa
