= Qonce =

Qonce King William's Town
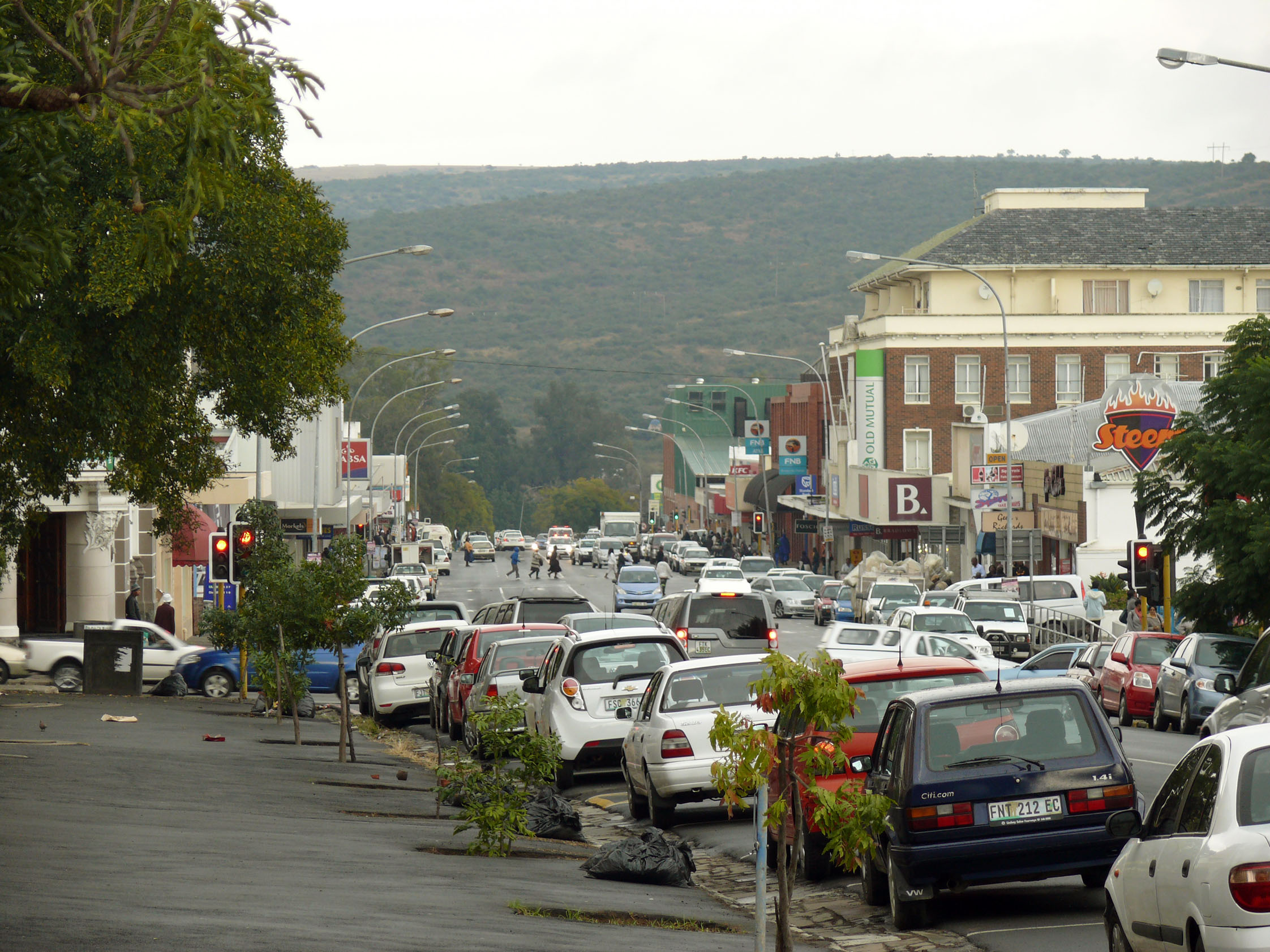
- Street scene

- Location within Eastern Cape Location within South Africa Location within Africa
- Coordinates: 32°53′S 27°24′E
- Country: South Africa
- Province: Eastern Cape
- District: Buffalo City
- Municipality: Buffalo City
- Established: 1835

Area
  - Total: 65.52 km^{2} (25.30 sq mi)
- Elevation: 398 m (1,306 ft)

Population (2011)
  - Total: 34,019
  - Density: 519.2/km^{2} (1,345/sq mi)

Racial makeup (2011)
  - Black African: 65.3%
  - Coloured: 25.6%
  - Indian/Asian: 2.5%
  - White: 5.6%
  - Other: 0.9%

First languages (2011)
  - Xhosa: 54.5%
  - Afrikaans: 27.3%
  - English: 13.7%
  - Other: 4.4%
- Time zone: UTC+2 (SAST)
- Postal code (street): 5601
- PO box: 5600
- Area code: 043

Qonce, formerly King William's Town, is a town in the Eastern Cape province of South Africa along the banks of the Buffalo River. The town is about 60 kilometres (37 mi) northwest of the Indian Ocean port of East London. It has a population of around 35,000 inhabitants and forms part of the Buffalo City Metropolitan Municipality.

The town lies 389 m (1,276 ft) above sea level at the foot of the Amathole Mountains in an area known for its agriculture. The town has one of the oldest post offices in the country developed by missionaries led by Charles Brownlee.

== History ==
For thousands of years, the area was roamed by Bushman bands, and then was used as grazing by the nomadic Khoikhoi, who called the Buffalo River Qonce. Xhosa people lived alongside the Khoikhoi, eventually taking over the land after Queen Hoho lost the war with King Ngqika kaMlawu.

King William's Town was founded by Sir Benjamin d’Urban in May 1835 during the Xhosa War of that year. The town stands on the site of the kraal of the minor chief Dyani Tyatyu and was named after William IV. It was abandoned in December 1836, but was reoccupied in 1846 and was the capital of British Kaffraria from its creation in 1847 to its incorporation in 1865 with the Cape Colony. Uniquely in the Cape Colony, its local government was styled a borough, rather than a municipality. Many of the colonists in the neighbouring districts are descendants of members of the British German Legion disbanded after the Crimean War and provided with homes in the Cape Colony, hence such names as Berlin, Braunschweig, Frankfurt, Hamburg, Potsdam and Stutterheim given to settlements in this part of the country.

It was declared the provincial capital of the surrounding Queen Adelaide's Province in the 1830s. On 5 May 1877, the Cape Government of Prime Minister John Molteno opened the first railway, connecting the town to East London on the coast and to the Xhosa lands inland and further east. With its direct railway communication, the town became an important entrepôt for trade with the Xhosa people throughout Kaffraria.

In 1973, a 108 hectare piece of protected land was established on the outskirts of town called the King William's Town Nature Reserve.

On 19 January 1981, a referendum was organized by King William's Town municipality, the result is overwhelmingly against incorporation into the Ciskei.

The area's economy depended on cattle and sheep ranching, and the town itself has a large industrial base producing textiles, soap, candles, sweets, cartons and clothing. Its proximity to the new provincial capital city of Bhisho has brought much development to the area since the end of apartheid in 1994.

In September 2020, the Eastern Cape government announced plans to give the town a new name as part of what it described as a programme aimed at transforming the country's geographic landscape to be more representative of its people. The city officially became Qonce on 21 February 2021.

The town is also home to Huberta, one of the furthest travelling hippopotami in South Africa. It is displayed in the Amathole Museum in the CBD.

== Notable people ==
- Makhaya Ntini, cricketer
- William Anderson Soga, the first black medical doctor and missionary
- Davidson Don Tengo Jabavu, educator and the first black professor in the country
- Zandile Msutwana, tv actress
- Lukhanyo Am, rugby player
- Jaden Hendrikse, rugby player
- Jordan Hendrikse, rugby player
- Aphelele Fassi, rugby player
- Steve Biko, Black Consciousness Movement leader, anti-apartheid activist
- Anaso Jobodwana, track and field athlete
- King Maxhob'ayakhawuleza Sandile "Aa! Zanesizwe!", king and ruler of the Rharhabe House of the Xhosa Kingdom.
- King Jonguxolo Sandile "Aa! Vul'ulwandle!", king and ruler of the Rharhabe House of the Xhosa Kingdom.
- Percy Fitzpatrick, author, politician, businessman, farming pioneer
- Andile Yenana, South African pianist
- Charles Patrick John Coghlan, first premier of Rhodesia
- Buster Farrer, international cricket, tennis and hockey player
- Garry Pagel, South African rugby player
- John Tengo Jabavu, founder of the first Xhosa-language newspaper in South Africa
- Griffiths Mxenge, anti-Apartheid activist
- Victoria Mxenge, anti-Apartheid activist
- Steve Tshwete, anti-Apartheid activist
- Raven Klaasen, professional tennis player
- CB Jennings, rugby player and mayor of King William's Town
- Masande Ntshanga, South African novelist
- Melville Edelstein, South African academic and social worker who was killed in the Soweto uprising.
