= S.S. Gida Hospital =

- Eastern Cape Department of Health

Geography
- Location: Keiskammahoek, Amathole District Municipality, Eastern Cape, South Africa
- Coordinates: 32°40′29″S 27°08′37″E

Organisation
- Care system: Public
- Type: Community

Services
- Emergency department: Yes
- Beds: 122

History
- Opened: May 1985

Links
- Website: www.echealth.gov.za
- Lists: Hospitals in South Africa

S.S. Gida Hospital is a Provincial government funded hospital for the Amahlathi Local Municipality area in Keiskammahoek, Eastern Cape in South Africa.

The hospital departments include Emergency department, Paediatric ward, Maternity ward, Out Patients Department, Surgical Services, Medical Services, Operating Theatre & CSSD Services, Pharmacy, Anti-Retroviral (ARV) treatment for HIV/AIDS, Post Trauma Counseling Services, X-ray Services, Physiotherapy, NHLS Laboratory, Laundry Services, Kitchen Services and Mortuary.
