= Red List of South African Plants =

Conservation status of plants endemic to South Africa

The Red List of South African Plants is a system used to classify endemic species of plants in South Africa that are at risk of extinction. The South African National Biodiversity Institute (SANBI) designates the conservation status of endemic species according to the IUCN Red List system of categories and criteria.

== History ==
Prior to publication of the Red List of South African Plants in 2010 was the Threatened Plants of Southern Africa in 1980 where 1893 taxa was assessed, the Red Data List of Southern African Plants in 1997 where 3916 taxa was assessed, and the Southern African Botanical Diversity Network Report in 2002 where 948 taxa was assessed.

In 2010, as part of SANBI's Threatened Species Programme, 20 456 indigenous plant taxa was assessed and each given a conservation status. This was the first time a megadiverse country had fully assessed the status of its entire flora; 13 265 of the assessed flora was endemic to South Africa.

== Categories ==
Categories used to assess endemic plants in South Africa.

Plants are assessed against the IUCN Red List system of categories and criteria.

=== IUCN categories ===
Extinct EX
For species when there is no reasonable doubt that the last individual has died.
Extinct in the Wild EW
For species known only to survive in cultivation.
Regionally Extinct RE
For species known to be extinct in an assessed region.
Critically Endangered CR
For when evidence of a species meets one of the five criteria in the IUCN Red List for Critically Endangered species.
- Critically Endangered, Possibly Extinct CR PE
A special tag associated with the category Critically Endangered.
Endangered EN
Equivalent to the IUCN category of Endangered.
Vulnerable VU
Equivalent to the IUCN category of Vulnerable.
Near Threatened NT
Equivalent to the IUCN category of Near Threatened.
Least Concern LC
For species that don't meet the criteria for Rare.
Data Deficient - Insufficient Information DDD
For when there is insufficient data to make an assessment
Data Deficient - Taxonomically Problematic DDT
For species that are difficult to describe taxonomically, thus assessment of its range and habitat is not well-defined.
Not Evaluated
For species that are hybrids, cultivars or naturalised exotic species.

=== Non-IUCN categories ===
Critically Rare
For species known to occur at a single site, but is not threatened and does not qualify against the five IUCN criteria for threatened species.
Rare
For species that meet one of the four South African criteria for rarity:
- Restricted range - Extent of occurrence (EOO) < 500 km^{2}, OR
- Habitat specialist - Area of occupancy (AOO) < 20 km^{2}, OR
- Low densities of individuals - The species occurs as single individuals or small subpopulations (fewer than 50 mature individuals), OR
- Small global population - The species has less than 10 000 mature individuals.
Declining
The species' overall population is in decline but a threshold of concern has not been reached.

== Statistics ==
A quarter of all assessed endemic species of plants are threatened with extinction or of conservation concern; in 2010, 13% of endemic plants were faced with extinction, with 11% of conservation concern.

== See also ==
- South African Environmental Observation Network – Long-term ecological research network
- Forest conservation in South Africa
- List of Champion Trees (South Africa) – Trees of significance in South Africa
