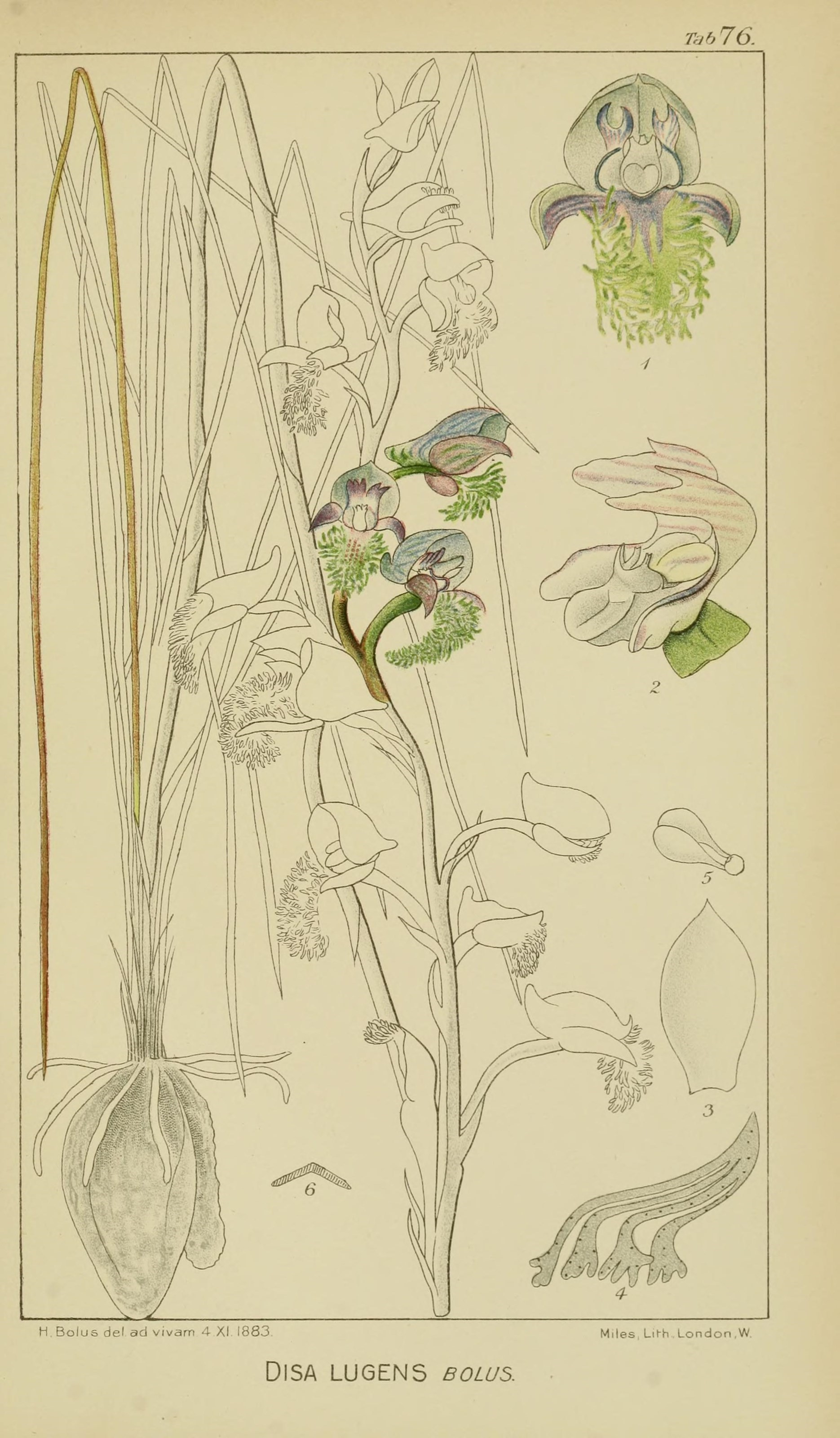

Scientific classification
- Kingdom: Plantae
- Clade: Tracheophytes
- Clade: Angiosperms
- Clade: Monocots
- Order: Asparagales
- Family: Orchidaceae
- Subfamily: Orchidoideae
- Genus: Disa
- Species: D. lugens

Binomial name
- Disa lugens Bolus

Synonyms
- Herschelia lugens (Bolus) Kraenzl.; Herschelianthe lugens (Bolus) Rauschert

= Disa lugens =

Species of flowering plant

Disa lugens, the blue bonnet disa, is a perennial plant and geophyte belonging to the genus Disa and is part of the fynbos. The plant is endemic to the Eastern Cape and Western Cape and occurs from the Cape Peninsula to Somerset East and Cathcart. The plant was once abundant but due to urban and coastal development, large parts of its habitat have been destroyed. The last specimen was seen on the Cape Flats in the 1970s and is considered extinct there. In the Port Elizabeth area, urban development has also affected the plant's appearance. Development on the coastal lowlands has also affected the plant's appearance. In the Eastern Cape, over grazing and crop cultivation have also affected the plant's appearance.

In 2007, a large subpopulation of approximately 500 to 1 000 plants was discovered in the Cathcart area. The plant does not require fires to flower.

There are two subspecies:

- Disa lugens var. lugens
- Disa lugens var. nigrescens (H.P.Linder) H.P.Linder
