= Gert Willner =

German politician

- Born: 16 April 1940; Deutsch Gabel, Reichsgau Sudetenland, Nazi Germany
- Died: 23 March 2000 (aged 59); Quickborn, Germany

Gert Willner (born 16 April 1940) was a CDU politician in Schleswig-Holstein. He was a member of the Bundestag for Pinneberg from the 1994 federal election until his death. He also co-founded the charity Children in Need. He was also mayor of Quickborn from 1974 to 1992.

Prior to his political work, he completed an administrative training course and obtained a degree in Administrative Management, and then worked as a consultant Schleswig-Holstein government.
