= CB Jennings =

South African rugby union player

- Born: Cecil Bruce Jennings; 16 August 1914 King William's Town, South Africa
- Died: 2 October 1989 (aged 75) East London, South Africa
- Height: 1.86 m (6 ft 1 in)
- Weight: 98 kg (216 lb)
- School: Dale College

Rugby union career
- Position: Prop
Provincial / State sides
Years	Team	Apps	(Points)
1934–1938	Border		
- Transvaal
International career
Years	Team	Apps	(Points)
1937	South Africa	1	(0)
1937	South Africa (tour)	10	(9)

Cecil Bruce "CB" Jennings (16 August 1914 – 2 October 1989) was a South African rugby union player.

== Biography ==
Jennings was educated at Dale College in King Williams Town and as a schoolboy played provincial rugby for Border in 1934. He played four provincial games in the 1934, a season in which Border shared the Currie Cup with Western Province. He later became the captain of Border and shortly before the Second World War he moved to the Witwatersrand where he worked on mines and was selected to play for the Transvaal.

In 1937 Jennings toured with the Springboks to Australia and New Zealand. He played his only test match for South Africa during the New Zealand leg of the tour, in the first test against the All Blacks on 14 August 1937 in Wellington. He also played ten tour matches and scored three tries.

During the War he served in the Rand Light Infantry in North Africa. He was a captain in the infantry and during a skirmish was wounded in both legs, causing him to spend months in hospital. After the war he returned to Johannesburg and coached the rugby team of the University of the Witwatersrand. in the mid-1950s he returned to King Williams Town and became involved in the activities of Dale College and served on the school board for several years. He also became a selector and coach of Border and also served five terms as mayor of King Williams Town. The rugby field at Dale College was named the CB Jennings rugby field in his honour.

=== Test history ===
No.	Opponents	Results (SA 1st)	Position	Tries	Dates	Venue
1.	New Zealand	7–13	Prop		14 Aug 1937	Athletic Park, Wellington

== See also ==
- List of South Africa national rugby union players – Springbok no. 254
