= Ernst Dieter Rossmann =

German politician

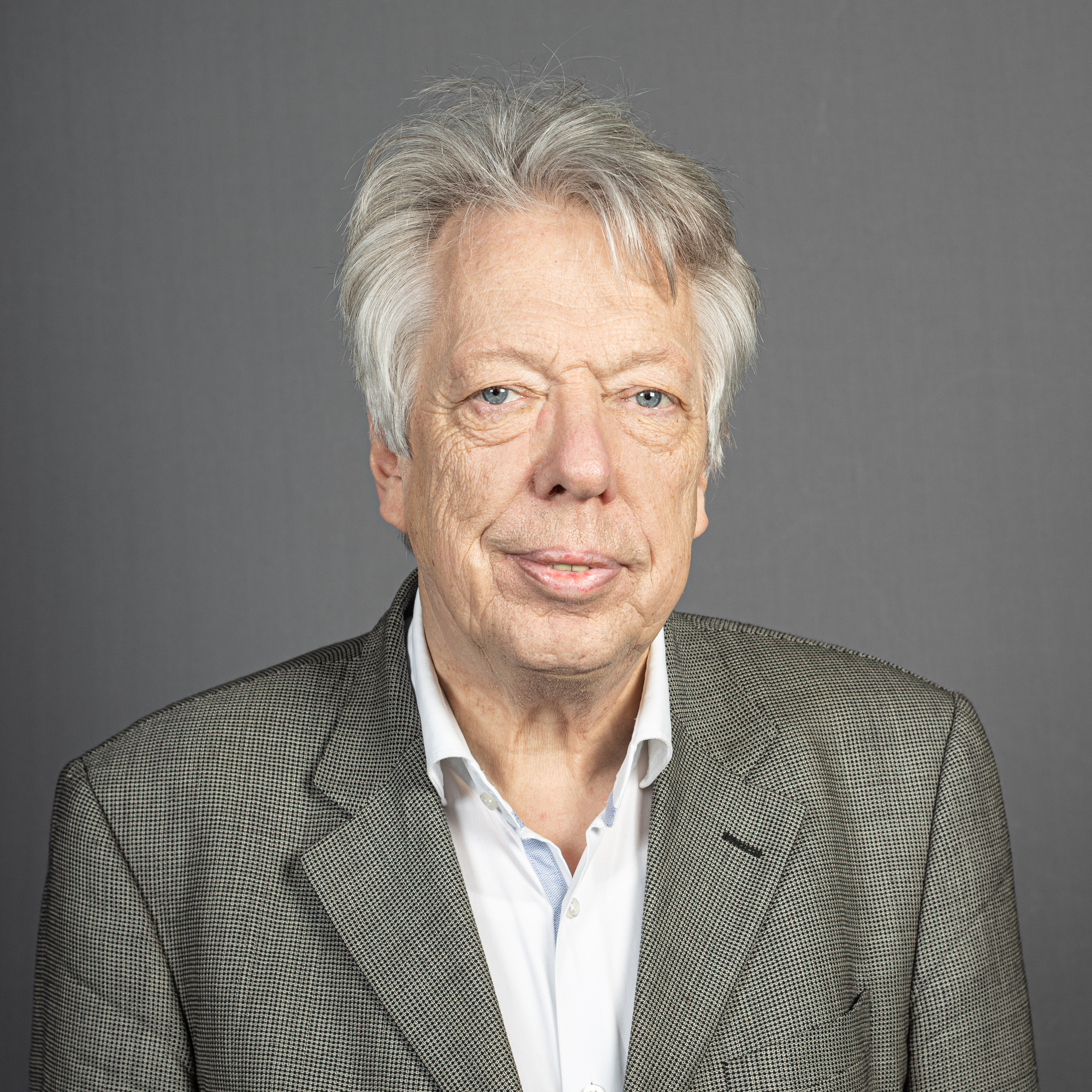
- Ernst Dieter Rossmann in 2020

Member of the Bundestag
- In office 1998–2021

Personal details
- Born: 4 February 1951 (age 75) Elmshorn, West Germany (now Germany)
- Party: SPD

Ernst Dieter Rossmann (born 4 February 1951) is a German politician of the Social Democratic Party (SPD) who served as a member of the Bundestag from the state of Schleswig-Holstein from 1998 until 2021.

== Political career ==
From 1987 until 1998, Rossmann served as a member of the State Parliament of Schleswig-Holstein. In this capacity, he was his parliamentary group's spokesperson for education policy from 1988 until 1996.

Rossmann became a member of the Bundestag in the 1998 German federal election, representing the Pinneberg district. Throughout his time in parliament, he was a member of the Committee on Education, Research and Technology Assessment.

In the negotiations to form a Grand Coalition of Chancellor Angela Merkel's Christian Democrats (CDU together with the Bavarian CSU) and the SPD following the 2013 federal elections, Rossmann was part of the SPD delegation in the working group on education and research policy, led by Johanna Wanka and Doris Ahnen.

In July 2020, Rossmann announced that he would not stand in the 2021 federal elections but instead resign from active politics by the end of the parliamentary term.

== Other activities ==
- University of Flensburg, Member of the Advisory Board
- Education and Science Workers' Union (GEW), Member
- Nature and Biodiversity Conservation Union (NABU), Member
