= Keiskammahoek =

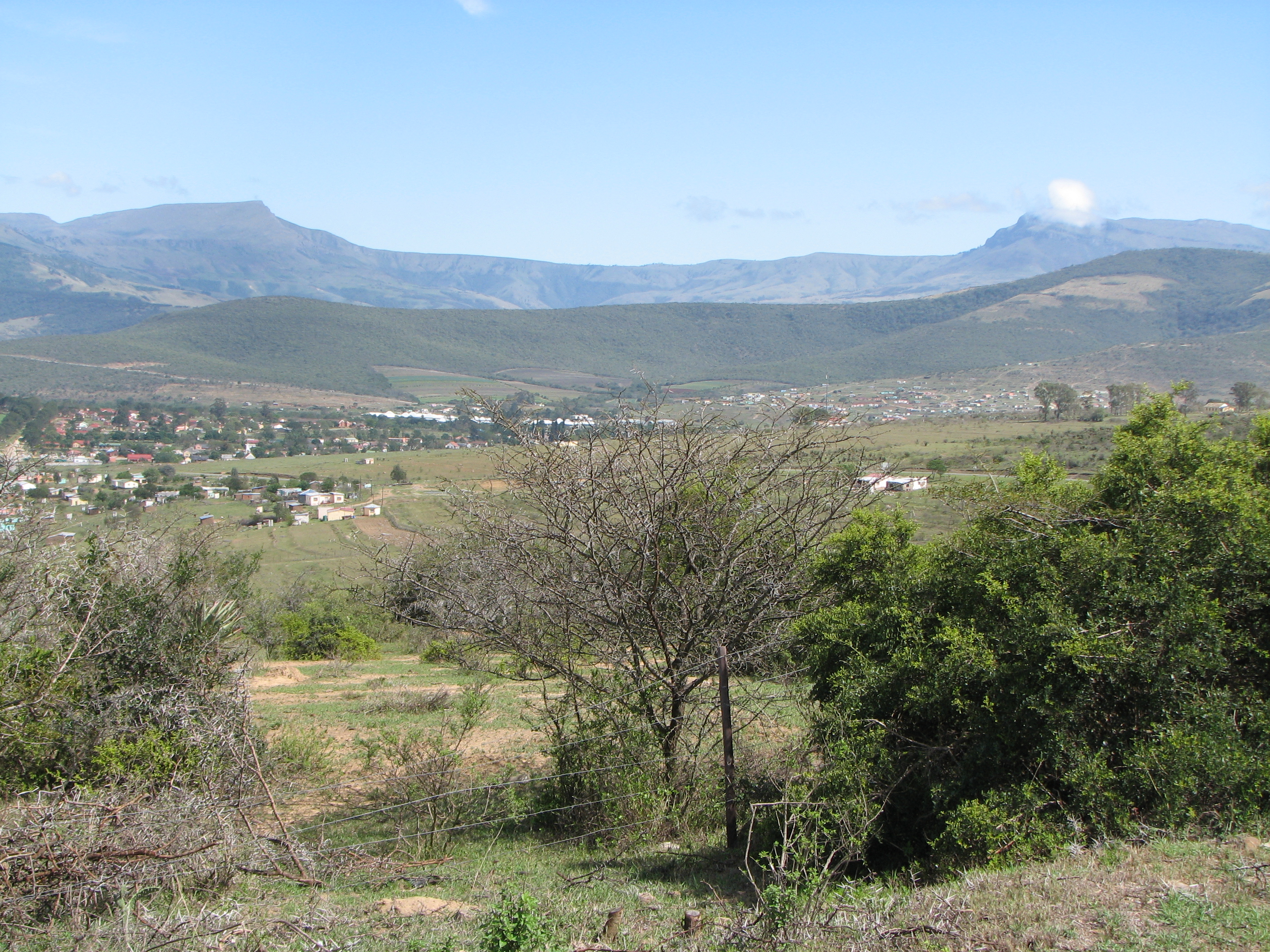
- View of Keiskammahoek from the hill

- Location within Eastern Cape Location within South Africa Location within Africa
- Coordinates: 32°41′S 27°09′E
- Country: South Africa
- Province: Eastern Cape
- District: Amathole
- Municipality: Amahlathi

Area
  - Total: 15.67 km^{2} (6.05 sq mi)
- Elevation: 670 m (2,200 ft)

Population (2011)
  - Total: 4,429
  - Density: 282.6/km^{2} (732.0/sq mi)

Racial makeup (2011)
  - Black African: 97.1%
  - Coloured: 1.4%
  - Indian/Asian: 0.2%
  - White: 0.3%
  - Other: 1.0%

First languages (2011)
  - Xhosa: 94.6%
  - Afrikaans: 1.8%
  - English: 1.1%
  - Other: 2.6%
- Time zone: UTC+2 (SAST)
- Postal code (street): 5670
- PO box: 5670
- Area code: 040

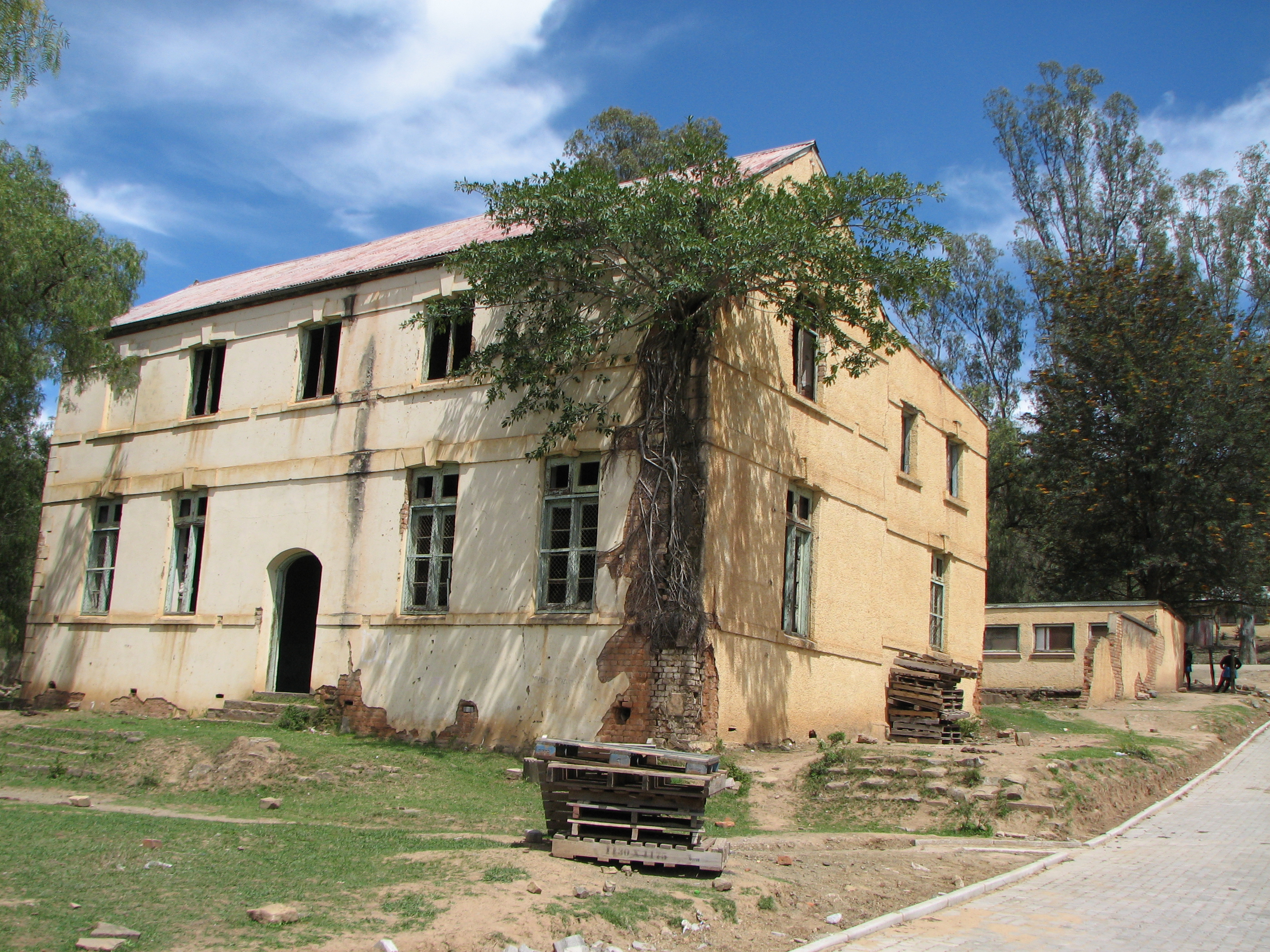
One of the buildings at the old St Matthews Mission School

Keiskammahoek (also spelled Keiskamahoek) is a town in the Eastern Cape Province, South Africa. From 1981 until the end of apartheid, the town was part of the Ciskei bantustan.

== Geography ==
Keiskammahoek is a small rural town that is situated some forty kilometers to the West of King William's Town in the Amahlathi Local Municipality, which is one of seven local municipalities that constitute the Amathole District Municipality, Eastern Cape. Keiskammahoek is surrounded by a number of villages and peri-urban settlements that support the town.

Keiskammahoek is situated near the headwaters of the Keiskamma River catchment area. It is located in the centre of four different biomes: Albany Thicket, Grasslands, Savannah and Afromontane forest.

== History ==
The town was once an important commercial centre for the timber and agricultural industries. The settlement of the area since the 1800s also led to the large-scale exploitation and destruction of the natural environment. The timber industry has moved towards Stutterheim and the agricultural production has declined somewhat.

Just outside the town is St Matthew's High School, one of South Africa's historic schools. Founded as a mission school by Bishop of Grahamstown John Armstrong in 1854, the school was once a particularly thriving educational centre, and the large parish church is a local landmark. A hospital and training facility for nurses was opened at the site in 1923 and the secondary school began in 1926.

Like other church schools, the Anglican Church withdrew from direct involvement in the school as a result of the 1953 Bantu Education Act. The state bought much of St Matthews' land in 1970, and in 1976 the hospital was taken over by the Ciskei government. It closed ten years later, moving to Keiskammahoek, where it became known as the SS Gida Hospital. The high school continues as a state boarding school for girls (with male day students). A small clinic remains on the school site, and the ruins of many of the school's buildings are everywhere evident.

Currently the economy of Keiskammahoek relies mainly on grants from the State. The population has been steadily declining and many villages are still without basic services such as water and sanitation. However, the town still maintains some of the remnants of the historic past and there are a number of historic buildings to be found such as the Gilead Church.

== Health facility ==
Keiskammahoek houses the medium-sized S.S. Gida Hospital, a Provincial government funded hospital for the Amahlathi area.

== Other ==
Marguerite Poland's Shades is set in a fictionalised version of Keiskammahoek and based on life at the mission station.

== Notable residents ==
- Alice Pegler, born in Keiskammahoek in 1861, noted botanical collector
- William Greenstock, born in Keiskammahoek in 1865, international cricketer
- Membathisi Mdladlana, born in Keiskammahoek in 1952, a member of Parliament with African National Congress and longtime Minister of Labour
- Henry Taberer, born in Keiskammahoek in 1870, international cricketer
