= Potsdam (disambiguation) =

Potsdam is a city in Brandenburg, Germany.

Potsdam may also refer to:

== Places ==
=== Germany ===
- Potsdam-Mittelmark, a rural district (Kreis) of Brandenburg
- Bezirk Potsdam, a former district (Bezirk) of East Germany
- Kreis Potsdam, a former rural district (Kreis) of East Germany
- Potsdam (region), a former region (Regierungsbezirk) of Prussia

=== Papua New Guinea ===
- Potsdam (Papua New Guinea), a village in the province of Madang

=== South Africa ===
- Potsdam, Eastern Cape, a village of Buffalo City, Eastern Cape

=== United States ===
- Potsdam (town), New York, a town in the State of New York
- Potsdam (village), New York, a village in the State of New York
- Stuart, Florida, a town in Florida, named Potsdam from 1893 to 1895
- Potsdam, Ohio, a village in Miami County, Ohio, United States with a population of about 200
- Potsdam, Minnesota, an unincorporated community in Olmsted County, Minnesota

== History ==
- Potsdam Agreement, an agreement on policy for the occupation and reconstruction of Germany
- Potsdam Conference, a World War II conference
- Potsdam Declaration, a statement calling for the Surrender of Japan in World War II

== Other ==
- Potsdam (film), a 1927 German silent drama film
- Potsdam Giants, the Prussian infantry regiment No 6, composed of taller-than-average soldiers
- Potsdam Hauptbahnhof, the main railway station of Potsdam
- Potsdamer Platz, a central square in Berlin
- Potsdam Sandstone, more formally known as the Potsdam Group, is a geologic unit of mid-to-late Cambrian age found in northeastern North America
