= Daniel Kölbl =

German politician (born 1993)

Member of the Bundestag
- Incumbent
- Assumed office 25 March 2025
- Preceded by: Ralf Stegner
- Constituency: Pinneberg

Personal details
- Born: 29 October 1993 (age 32) Elmshorn, Schleswig-Holstein Germany
- Party: Christian Democratic Union
- Website: https://www.daniel-koelbl.de/

Daniel Kölbl (born 29 October 1993 in Elmshorn) is a German politician from the Christian Democratic Union (CDU).

== Political career ==
On October 14, 2024, Kölbl won 217 votes (53.71%) of the members in the Pinneburg district association to be a direct candidate in the federal election. In the 2025 federal election, he ran in the Pinneberg federal constituency and won with 31.8% of the first vote and entered the German Bundestag.
