= Michael von Abercron =

German agricultural engineer and politician

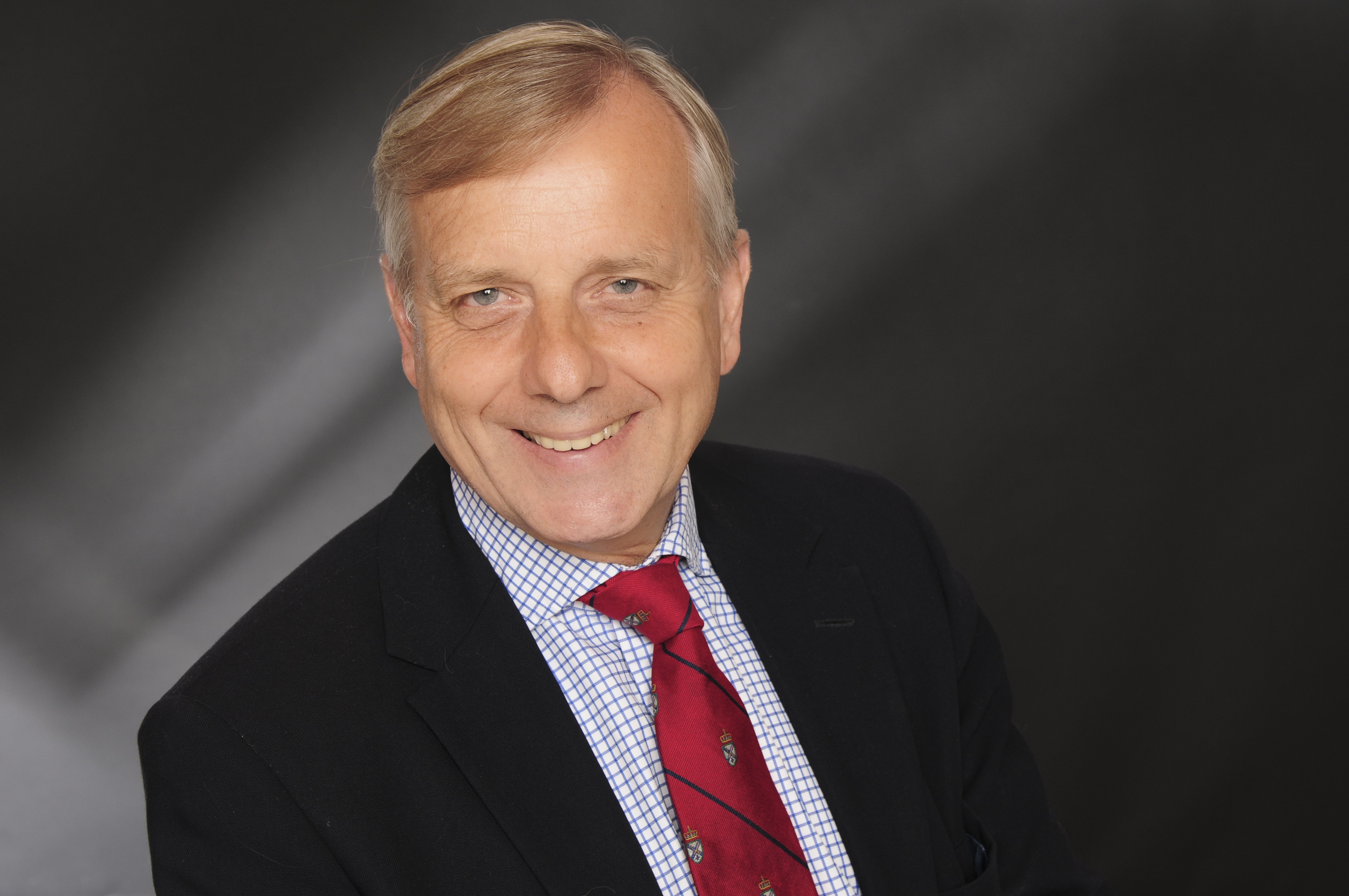

Member of the Bundestag for Pinneberg
- In office 24 September 2017 – 2021
- Preceded by: Ole Schröder

Personal details
- Born: 17 November 1952 (age 73) Wangels, Schleswig-Holstein, West Germany
- Party: Christian Democratic Union
- Children: Two
- Occupation: Politician / Agricultural engineer

Michael von Abercron (born 17 November 1952) is an agricultural engineer and politician of the Christian Democratic Union (CDU) who served as a member of the Bundestag from 2017 to 2021.

== Early life ==
Son of the landowner Friedrich-Karl von Abercron (1914–2002) and Huberta von Rodde (1919–2015), Abercron grew up on his parents' estate in Ostholstein, a district of Schleswig-Holstein.

From 2005 until 2009, Abercron served as chief of staff to Christian von Boetticher, the State Minister of Agriculture and the Environment in the government of Minister-President of Schleswig-Holstein Peter Harry Carstensen.

== Political career ==
Following the 2009 state elections, Abercron became a member of the Landtag of Schleswig-Holstein. In parliament, he served as his parliamentary group's spokesperson on environmental issues and data privacy. He was a member of the Committee on Internal and Legal Affairs and of the Committee of the Environment.

Abercron was elected to the Bundestag in the 2017 federal elections, succeeding Ole Schröder as the directly-elected representative for Pinneberg. He was a member of the Committee on Education, Research and Technology Assessment and of the Committee on Food and Agriculture.

== Political positions ==
Ahead of the Christian Democrats’ leadership election in 2021, Abercron publicly endorsed Friedrich Merz to succeed Annegret Kramp-Karrenbauer as the party’s chair.
