= Cathcart, South Africa =

Cathcart
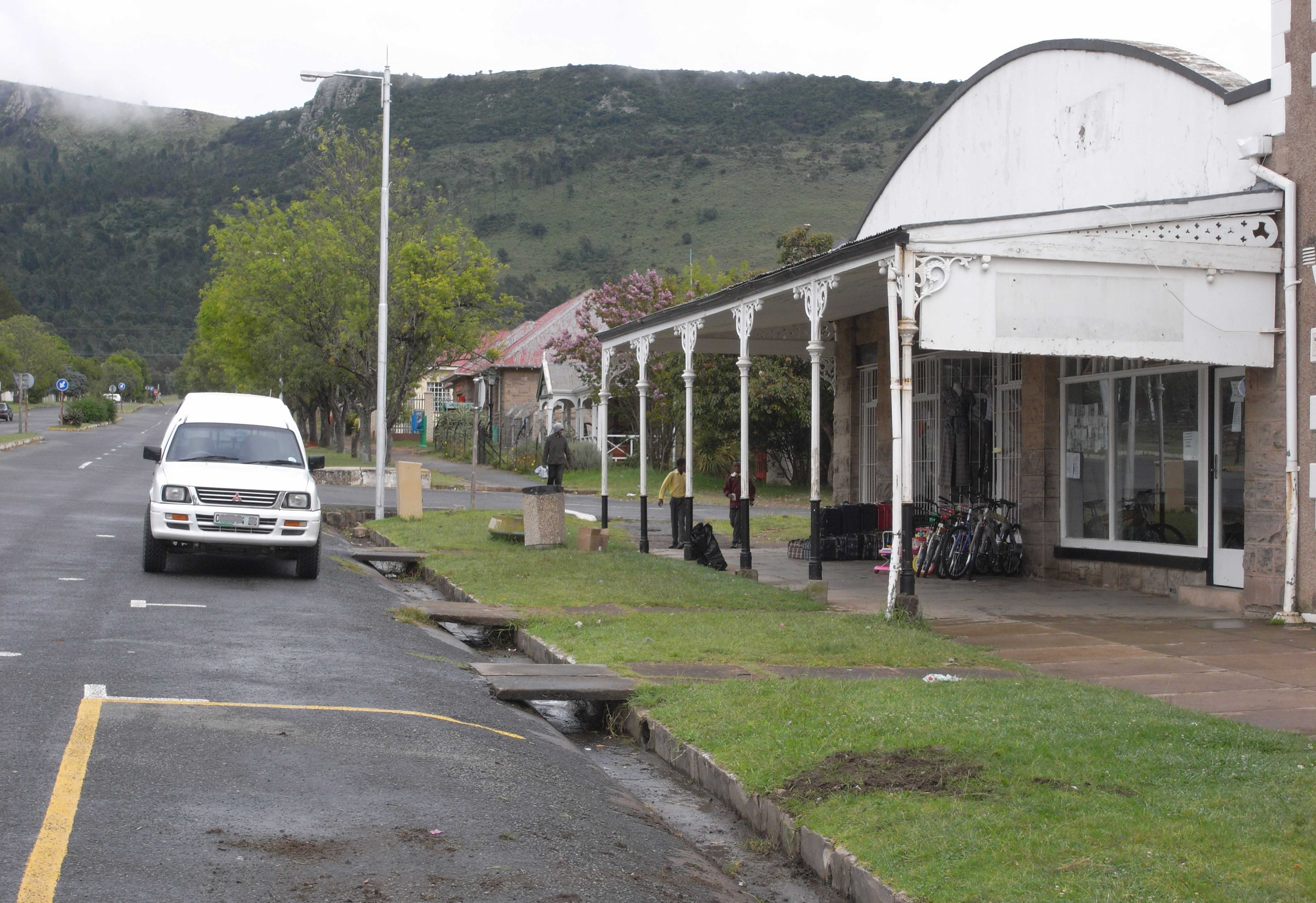
- Main street in Cathcart

- Location within Eastern Cape Location within South Africa Location within Africa
- Coordinates: 32°18′S 27°08′E
- Country: South Africa
- Province: Eastern Cape
- District: Amathole
- Municipality: Amahlathi
- Established: 1858

Area
  - Total: 30.1 km^{2} (11.6 sq mi)

Population (2011)
  - Total: 7,360
  - Density: 245/km^{2} (633/sq mi)

Racial makeup (2011)
  - Black African: 93.4%
  - Coloured: 2.0%
  - Indian/Asian: 0.1%
  - White: 4.3%
  - Other: 0.2%

First languages (2011)
  - IsiXhosa: 90.6%
  - English: 4.5%
  - Afrikaans: 3.1%
  - Other: 1.8%
- Time zone: UTC+2 (SAST)
- Postal code (street): 5310
- PO box: 5310
- Area code: 045

Cathcart is a town in the Eastern Cape province of South Africa, named after Sir George Cathcart, governor of the Colony of the Cape of Good Hope 1852–1853. The town is situated on the N6, 48 kilometres (30 mi) north of Stutterheim en route to Komani.

== Establishment ==
Originally a small military post established during the Eighth Frontier War, Cathcart was established as a village in 1858 when German colonists arrived in the region. The village was formally laid out in 1858 and it only consisted of one inhabited dwelling. It only gained more settlers in the year 1876. It was named after the governor of the Colony of the Good Hope in 1852-1853, Sir George Cathcart. Work on its railway connection to East London on the coast was begun by the Cape government of John Molteno in 1876, and the line was officially opened on 3 November 1879. The Cathcart Shrine was the first built shrine in Africa and it was blessed in 1949.

== Religion ==
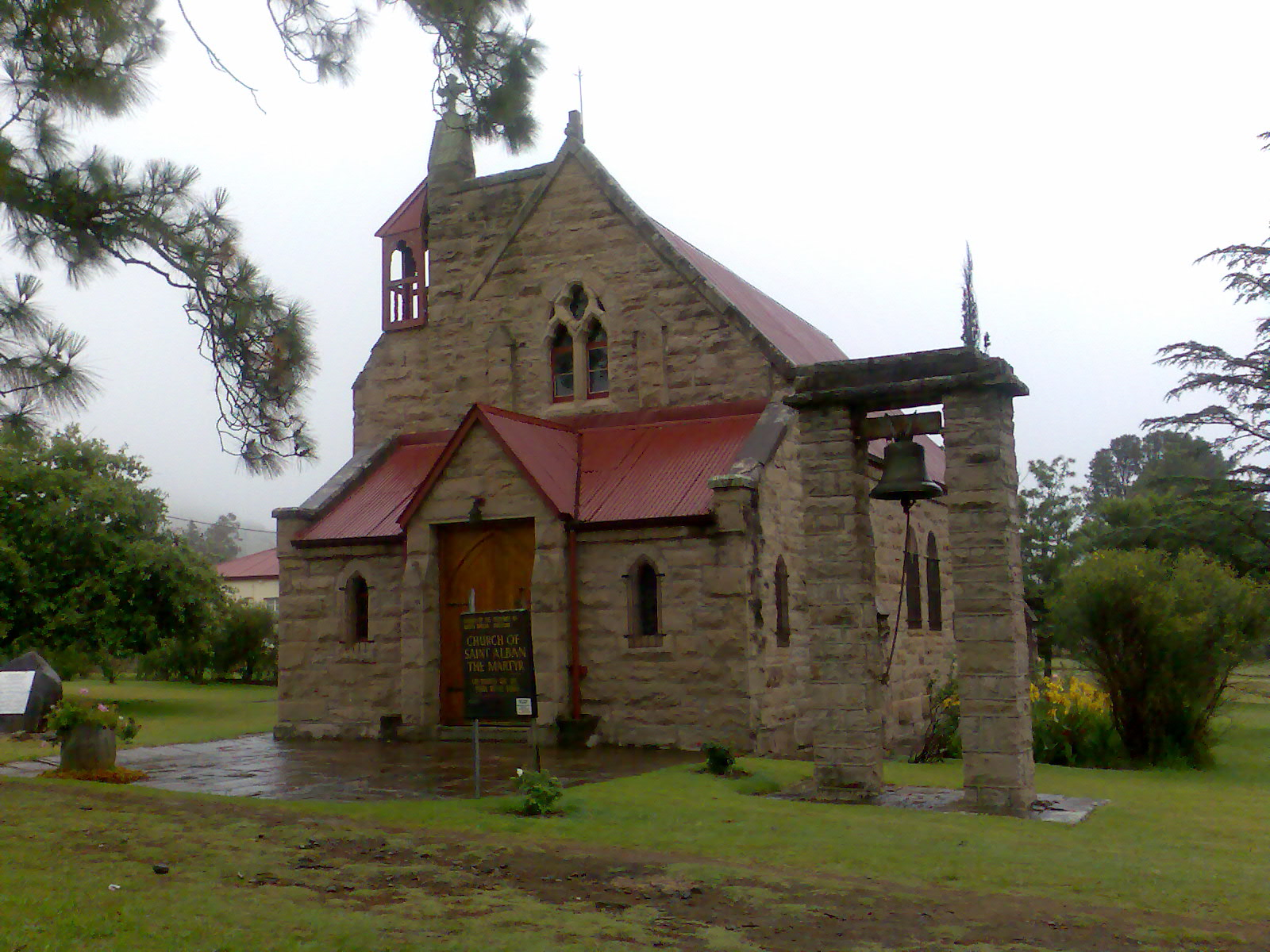
Church of Saint Alban at Cathcart in the Eastern Cape South Africa on the road to Aliwal North.

St. Alban's Anglican Church, (Note: St. Alban's Anglican Church is located at 32°17′51″S 27°08′32″E) built in 1886 is a well known landmark in Cathcart and has an unusual and distinctive Western façade.

== Education ==
There are a number of high schools and primary schools in Cathcart. Cathcart High School is located north of the town near the N6 route to Queenstown. (Note: Cathcart High School is located at 32°17′39″S 27°08′32″E)

•* Cathcart Primary School •* Cathcart High School •* Fenfield Farm School •* Goshen Public School

== Notable people ==
- Allister Sparks
