= Rolf Bremer =

German politician

Member of the Bundestag
- In office 19 October 1965 – 13 December 1976

Personal details
- Born: 4 July 1926 Lübeck
- Died: 5 May 1991 (aged 64) Elmshorn, Schleswig-Holstein, Germany
- Party: CDU

Rolf Bremer (July 4, 1926 – May 5, 1991) was a German politician of the Christian Democratic Union (CDU) and former member of the German Bundestag.

== Life ==
Bremer joined the CDU, had been chairman of the CDU district association in Pinneberg since 1965 and was elected to the state executive of the CDU Schleswig-Holstein in 1967. Bremer was a member of the German Bundestag from 1965 to 1976. He was directly elected to the Bundestag in 1965 as a member of parliament for the Pinneberg constituency and then always entered the Bundestag via the Schleswig-Holstein state list.

== Literature ==
Herbst, Ludolf; Jahn, Bruno (2002). Vierhaus, Rudolf (ed.). Biographisches Handbuch der Mitglieder des Deutschen Bundestages. 1949–2002 [Biographical Handbook of the Members of the German Bundestag. 1949–2002] (in German). München: De Gruyter - De Gruyter Saur. p. 1715. ISBN 978-3-11-184511-1.
