= Cornelia Möhring =

German politician (born 1960)

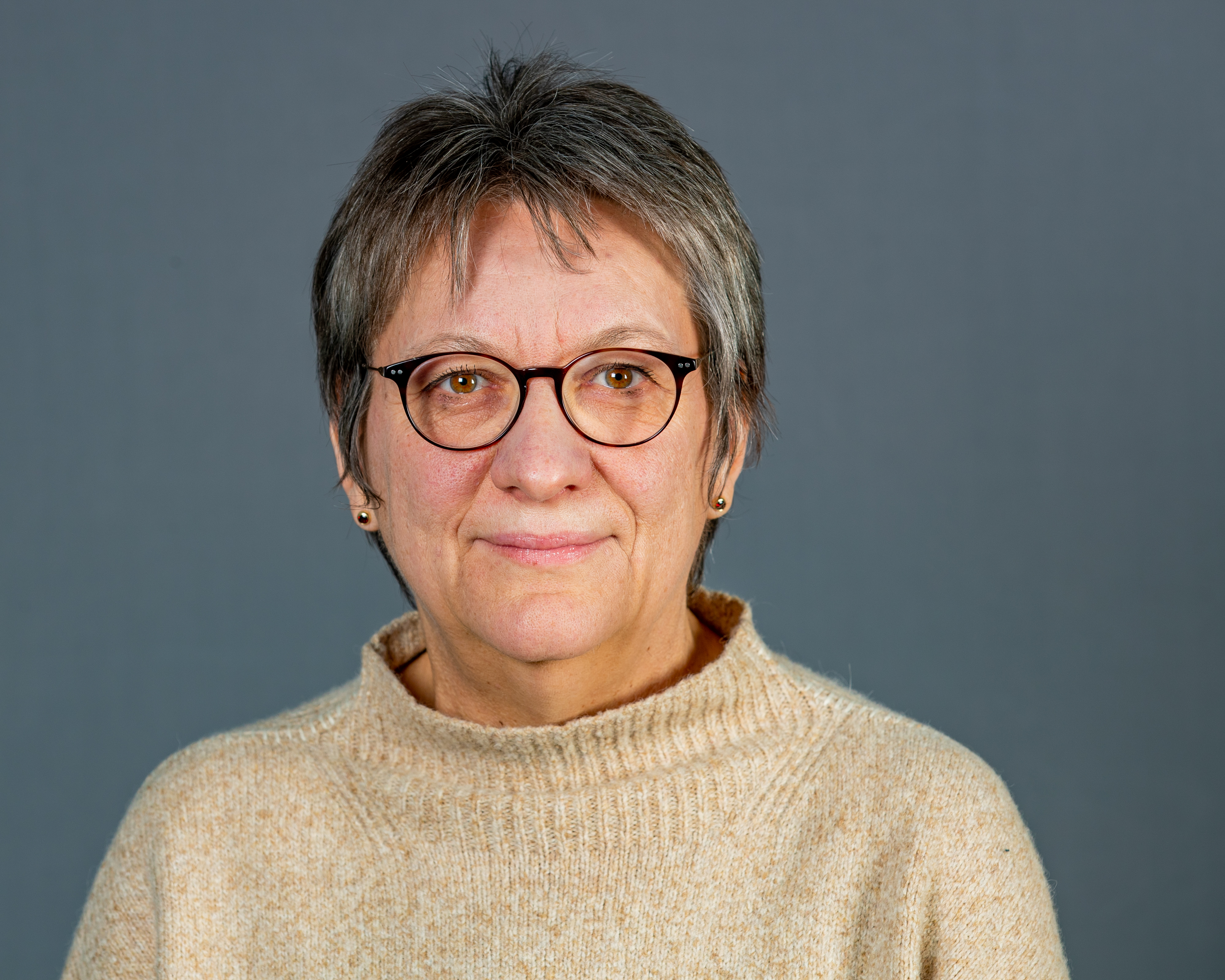
- Möhring in 2020

Member of the Bundestag
- Incumbent
- Assumed office 2009

Personal details
- Born: 9 January 1960 (age 66) Hamburg, West Germany (now Germany)
- Party: The Left

Cornelia Möhring (born 9 January 1960) is a German politician. Born in Hamburg, she represents The Left. Cornelia Möhring has served as a member of the Bundestag from the state of Schleswig-Holstein since 2009.

== Life ==
Cornelia Möhring completed an apprenticeship as an industrial clerk after her secondary school leaving certificate. After her second education, she studied social economics at the University of Applied Sciences in Hamburg with a focus on organizational sociology and social psychology. She became member of the bundestag after the 2009 German federal election. She is a member of the Committee for Labour and Social Affairs. She is the spokesperson for her group on women's policy. In 2024 Möhring announced, she isn't seeking re-election for Bundestag in 2025.
