= Ingrid Roitzsch =

German journalist and politician (1940–2011)

Ingrid Roitzsch (born Ingrid Höhle: 30 July 1940 – 31 January 2011) was a German journalist and politician (CDU). She served between 1992 and 1993 as parliamentary secretary of state (loosely, "junior minister") at the Ministry of Defence.

Some thought her controversial. She campaigned for the abolition of the abortion ban and in favour of equal rights for women. On 7 April 1988 she hit the headlines by lighting a cigarette on an airplane in defiance of a smoking ban applied throughout a (domestic) flight by the pilot, on his own initiative, because the WHO had controversially declared the day a "World no smoking day". She later told reporters she was launching a legal action against the airline, Lufthansa, in respect of the matter. After leaving politics she worked in public relations for the cigarette industry.

== Life ==
=== Provenance and early years ===
Ingrid Höhle was born in Munich. She nevertheless grew up as a Protestant. Although her mother was from Munich, her father was from the north. She attended the Liceo linguistico (multi-cultural multi-lingual secondary school) at Wiesbaden, graduating from it successfully in 1960. Because of "Numerus clausus" restrictions she was unable to gain a place at the nearby University of Mainz to study Medicine. Instead, she studied for a combined degree in Jurisprudence and "Zeitungswissenschaften" (literally, "Newspaper sciences"). At university she served as a member of the General Students [representation] committee. She also took a year abroad, to improve her French, emerging from the University of Angers with a "Diploma in Applied French" ("Diplom de français pratique").

She married Ullrich Roitzsch in 1963 and her student career came to an abrupt halt. Her two children were born over the next few years. Ingrid Roitsch's next career move was to the Pinneberger Tageblatt, a regional daily newspaper published near Hamburg. She started as an internee, later joining the payroll as a contributing editor between 1971 and 1980.

=== Politics ===
Ingrid Roitzsch joined the centre-right CDU (party) in 1970, In 1971 she joined the local party executive for Pinneberg and in 1981 the regional party executive for Schleswig-Holstein. She served as a local councillor between 1978 and 1980.

She entered the Bundestag (West German national parliament) as a CDU "list candidate" in 1980. At the next election, in 1983, she was successful in a closely fought contest against Reinhard Ueberhorst (SPD), as a directly elected candidate representing the Pinneberg electoral district. For the rest of her fourteen years in the Bundestag she would continue to sit as a directly elected member on behalf of the Pinneberg electoral district. In the parliamentary party she served as a party business manager ("parlamentarische Geschäftsführerin") for the CDU/CSU parliamentary group.

On 8 April 1992 Ingrid Roitzsch became parliamentary secretary of state (loosely, "junior minister") at the Ministry of Defence and thereby a member of the government led by Helmut Kohl. However, several government posts were reshuffled on 22 January 1993, and Roitzsch was one of those who left the government after turning down an offer to switch to the Families Ministry.

Principal themes of her parliamentary career included a commitment to abolishing the West German ban on abortion. This went alongside a more general advocacy of equal rights for women.
