= Anni Krahnstöver =

German politician (1904–1961)

Anni Krahnstöver (née Leffler; born 4 June 1904; died 27 July 1961) was a German politician of the Social Democratic Party of Germany.

== Life ==
Born in Kiel, Krahnstöver joined the Socialist Workers' Youth in 1920. She worked as an office clerk and later as a party employee for Louise Schroeder, then head of the SPD women's department Schleswig-Holstein. In 1933, as one of the youngest women's secretaries in the SPD in Oppeln (Upper Silesia), she did district women's work for her party. After 1933, apart from a brief arrest by the Gestapo, she apparently remained unmolested and contributed to the family's livelihood as a sales representative.

Bombed out and forcibly evacuated in January 1945, she returned to Schleswig-Holstein via a refugee camp in the Lüneburg Heath to work there again as a women's secretary. This appointment was on the initiative of Louise Schroeder.

Krahnstöver was a member of the second appointed Landtag of Schleswig-Holstein in 1946/1947 and then of the first elected Landtag until 4 January 1948. At the same time, she was a member of the Zonenbeirat in 1947/48, then of the Wirtschaftsrates der Bizone in 1948/49. She was a member of the German Bundestag in its first legislative period from 1949 to 1953 as a directly elected member of the Pinneberg constituency. During this time, she was elected to the parliamentary group executive and to the federal party executive of the SPD. As an expert on refugee and expellee problems, she represented her parliamentary group in the relevant committees, chaired the Emergency Aid Control Committee and was the only woman to sit on the Mediation Committee between the Bundestag and Bundesrat. From 1950 to 1953, she was a deputy member of the Consultative Assembly of the Council of Europe.

From her first marriage, Krahnstöver had two daughters, born in 1928 and 1930 respectively. After her divorce, she married the SPD politician Wilhelm Mellies in 1953. After leaving parliament, she continued to work on the SPD women's committee and in the Workers' Welfare Association.

Wilhelm Mellies died in 1958 in Bonn. After a five-year break, Krahnstöver was unable to resume her political career. Just three years later, she died of a heart attack at the age of 57.

== Literature ==
- Sabine Jebens-Ibs, Maria Zachow-Ortmann: Schleswig-Holsteinische Politikerinnen der Nachkriegszeit. Lebensläufe (Contemporary Issues; Volume 73). Landeszentrale für politische Bildung Schleswig-Holstein, Kiel 1994, ISBN 3-88312-048-0, p. 28 f.
