= Döhne =

South African agricultural research station

Döhne Agricultural Development Institute
- Location: Amahlathi Local Municipality, Döhne, South Africa
- Coordinates: 32°31′40″S 27°27′13″E

Döhne is a South African agricultural research station 6 kilometres north of Stutterheim in the Eastern Cape. It is noted for having developed the Döhne Merino from Peppin Merino ewes and German mutton merino sires in 1939. The program bred for high fertility, rapid lamb growth and fine wool production under pastoral conditions. The breed was introduced to Australia in 1998.

== History ==
On 24 September 1834, the Berlin Missionary Society's first South African mission station, Bethany, was founded on the Riet River between Edenburg and Trompsburg in the Orange Free State. With the arrival of more missionaries in 1837, the society expanded its work to the Eastern Cape and the Xhosa. Here Döhne played an important role in the founding of the stations Bethel and Itemba. These stations were abandoned during the Frontier War of 1846–47, when the missionaries found refuge in the neighbouring colony of Natal. With the closing of the Eastern Cape missions, the focus of the Berlin Missionary Society shifted to Natal and the Transvaal. Christianenberg, Emmaus and other mission stations were established there, and Döhne became a well-known figure among the Voortrekkers. In 1857 some German veterans of the Crimean War settled around Fort Döhne which had been built near the mission station. The Molteno government of the Cape Colony opened a railway station here in 1874, as part of its nationwide Cape Government Railways network.

The settlement was named Döhne after Jacob Ludwig Döhne (1811–1879), the lexicographer and philologist from the Berlin Missionary Society, who was responsible for compiling A Zulu-Kafir Dictionary (Cape Town, 1857) after spending twenty years documenting the language and dialects, also translating the New Testament into Xhosa and Zulu.
