= Richard von Stutterheim =

Prussian military officer (1815-1871)

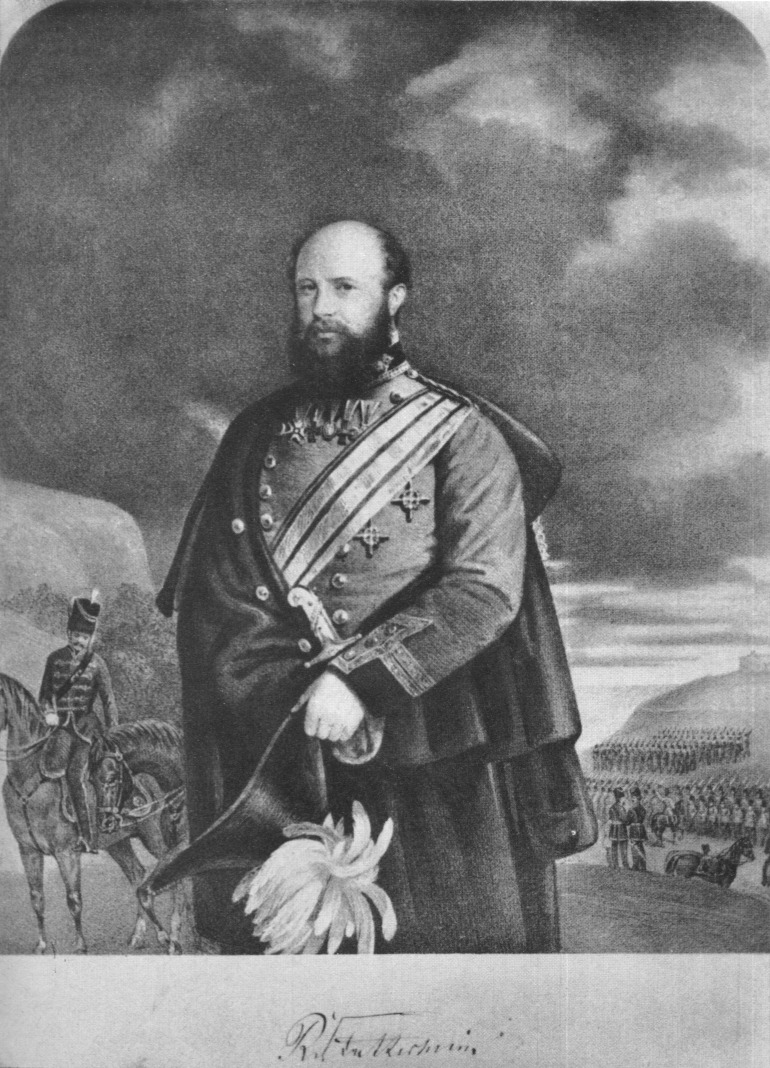
Richard von Stutterheim

Baron Richard Carl Gustav Ludwig Wilhelm Julius von Stutterheim (10 August 1815 in Helmstedt – 9 November 1871 in Wiesbaden) was a Prussian – later also British – officer and commander of the British-German Legion.

Von Stutterheim had received military education from the Prussian Cadet School in Cologne, but his political views guided him towards liberal causes. Between 1835 and 1838, he served with the British Legion in the Carlist War, and in 1848–1851 he supported the failed uprising of Schleswig-Holstein against Denmark in the First Schleswig War.

He was given a commission to raise German troops for the Mexican President Santa Anna. After Santa Anna was deposed in August 1854, the Baron offered his services to Britain.

He became the commander of the military men who were called to settle the East London region by Sir George Grey, Governor of the Cape Colony, in 1857. The town of Stutterheim in South Africa is named after him.
