= Amahlathi Local Municipality =

Coordinates: 32°34′19″S 27°25′35″E

Amahlathi
- Local municipality
- Seal

- Location in the Eastern Cape
- Country: South Africa
- Province: Eastern Cape
- District: Amathole
- Seat: Stutterheim
- Wards: 14

Government
  - Type: Municipal council

Area
  - Total: 4,820 km^{2} (1,860 sq mi)

Population (2011)
  - Total: 122,778
  - Density: 25.5/km^{2} (66.0/sq mi)

Racial makeup (2011)
  - Black African: 96.5%
  - Coloured: 1.2%
  - Indian/Asian: 0.1%
  - White: 2.0%

First languages (2011)
  - Xhosa: 93.4%
  - English: 2.9%
  - Afrikaans: 2.0%
  - Other: 1.7%
- Time zone: UTC+2 (SAST)
- Municipal code: EC124

Amahlathi Municipality (Xhosa: uMasipala wase Amahlathi) is a local municipality within the Amatole District Municipality, in the Eastern Cape province of South Africa. Amahlati is an isiXhosa word meaning "a place where many trees are grouped together, a forest". Forests are a key feature of the area. From 1972 to 1994, much of the land now encompassing the municipality was part of the former Ciskei bantustan.

== Main places ==
The 2001 census divided the municipality into the following main places:

Place	Code	Area (km^{2})	Population
Amahlathi	21301	86.06	11,511
Amantinde	21302	2.83	2,148
Amazizi	21303	258.26	13,230
Cathcart	21304	51.47	2,073
Cumakala	21305	3.48	12,424
Daliwe	21306	0.53	2,704
Dohne	21307	0.42	0
Eluxolweni	21308	11.66	2,372
Emthonjeni	21309	7.17	1,242
Frankfort	21310	0.28	362
Gxulu	21311	0.73	96
Heckel	21312	6.07	462
Hlubi	21313	1.00	2,145
Katikati	21314	8.16	3,212
Keiskammahoek North	21316	370.99	22,455
Keiskammahoek	21315	5.38	2,302
Lusikisiki	21317	18.49	523
Marienthal	21318	0.73	130
Ngqika	21319	172.63	9,534
Peelton	21320	18.86	13,035
Stutterheim Part 1	21321	67.58	5,052
Stutterheim Part 2	21327	6.17	4,962
Toise	21322	73.59	2,757
Zali's Location	21323	19.14	1,364
Zibula	21324	49.76	3,570
Zwelitsha	21325	37.74	8,651
Remainder of the municipality	21326	2,986.57	10,705

== Politics ==
The municipal council consists of twenty-seven members elected by mixed-member proportional representation. Fourteen councillors are elected by first-past-the-post voting in fourteen wards, while the remaining thirteen are chosen from party lists so that the total number of party representatives is proportional to the number of votes received.

In the election of 4 November 2026 the African National Congress (ANC) won a majority of eighteen seats.

The following table shows the results of the election.

Party	Ward			List			Total seats
Party	Votes	%	Seats	Votes	%	Seats	Total seats
African National Congress	15,866	64.54	14	15,903	64.80	4	18
Democratic Alliance	2,355	9.58	0	2,305	9.39	3	3
South African Communist Party	2,311	9.40	0	2,210	9.00	2	2
Economic Freedom Fighters	1,768	7.19	0	1,693	6.90	2	2
African Transformation Movement	922	3.75	0	944	3.85	1	1
uMkhonto weSizwe Party	409	1.66	0	716	2.92	1	1
Independent candidates	251	1.02	0				0
7 other parties	701	2.85	0	771	3.14	0	0
Total	24,583	100.00	14	24,542	100.00	13	27
Valid votes	24,583	98.32		24,542	98.23		
Invalid/blank votes	419	1.68		441	1.77		
Total votes	25,002	100.00		24,983	100.00		
Registered voters/turnout	50,308	49.70		50,308	49.66		
