= German-South African Lawyers Association =

The German-South African Lawyers Association (GSLA; in German: Deutsch-Südafrikanische Juristenvereinigung) is a bilateral association open to all lawyers from South Africa and Germany with a specific interest in the respective other legal system. It particularly addresses persons from the two countries who are concerned with South African or German law due to their studies or professional occupation.

== Aims ==
The GSLA strives for the establishment of permanent professional and personal contacts between lawyers from South Africa and Germany. Some of the GSLA’s aims consist of the propagation and extension of knowledge about South African as well as German law and legal thinking; the promotion of studies and academic work; the cultivation of academic cooperation with like-minded associations, institutions and organisations; the promotion of vocational training for young lawyers from both legal systems; the provision of contacts to answer enquiries regarding South African or German law.

== Activities and projects ==
Apart from the annual meetings of the General Assembly the GSLA organises or takes part in meetings and conferences relating to its field of interest in varying intervals. Correlating, there is a special interest to establish contacts to like-minded associations and institutions. Thereby the GSLA regards itself as an information and networking service for its members. Due to the great geographical distance between South Africa and Germany a focal point for this is formed by the association's web site. It contains an extensive collection of legal links on South Africa as well as links with information on German law in English. An emphasis is placed on a collection of legal references as well as information on academic and professional matters.

== Board of directors ==
At present, the board of directors consists of five persons: Rüdiger Dorobek (chairman), Philip Küpper (vice chairman), Dr. Jörgen Vogt, Raphael van de Sand and Annekatrin Donath.
