= Jacob Ludwig Döhne =

Jacob Ludwig Döhne (9 November 1811 Zierenberg – 2 June 1879 Fort Pine near Dundee, KwaZulu-Natal), from the Berlin Missionary Society, who was responsible for compiling A Zulu-Kafir Dictionary (Cape Town, 1857) after spending twenty years documenting the language and dialects. He also translated the New Testament into Xhosa and Zulu.

Döhne joined a mission seminary in 1832 and landed in Cape Town in 1836 with the second mission of the Berlin Missionary Society to South Africa. After first visiting Franschhoek, Döhne left for Kaffraria in response to a request from fellow missionary Kayser. He arrived by boat in Port Elizabeth after a three-week voyage and made his way to Knappeshope to meet up with Kayser. Here he set about mastering Xhosa, showing a quick grasp of the language. He started meticulously compiling lists of words and their meanings, laying the groundwork of a comprehensive dictionary.

Döhne started his missionary work under a local chief, Gasela. The missionary's poor eating habits soon led to malnutrition, aggravated by the tribe's decision to move. Arriving at the site of the new kraal, Döhne found the piece of ground granted him by the Chief, already occupied. A new site was found and the mission station Bethel near Stutterheim, was started on 15 February 1837.

Döhne's prospective wife, Bertha Göhler, arrived from Germany and they were married on 6 February 1838. The missionaries Posselt, Lisreidt and Schmidt arrived to aid him in his work, while the wives started a school to train the young Xhosa women in home industry. A short while later Döhne's wife died in childbirth, the baby son surviving only four months.

Chief Gasela felt he was losing control of his tribe and blamed Döhne's God. Problems flared up at the mission and the chief became openly hostile. The loss of respect for Döhne adversely affected his work.

The death of chief Gasela marked a turning point in the fortunes of Bethel. Many potential converts had been intimidated by the chief, and there was now a flood of people to be baptised. A new church was constructed and consecrated on 10 October 1841.

In 1843 Döhne published "Das Kafferland Und seine Bewohner" and then started on the translation of the Bible into Xhosa. The British Bible Society contributed some paper and the translation of the Psalms soon appeared in print. Döhne collaborated with Karl Wilhelm Posselt (1815–1885) and translated the books of Moses.

Döhne's second wife, Auguste Kembly, arrived from Berlin and eventually had two children.

Theophilus Shepstone was posted in Natal as an agent for the Bantu tribes just before war broke out in 1846. He reported that he came across some 100 000 refugee Bantu fleeing the Zulu chiefs Chaka, Dingane and Mpanda. He entreated the missions in Kaffraria to afford the refugees sanctuary. The Frontier War of 1846-47 between the Xhosa and the Whites put an end to all plans and the missionaries joined the fleeing masses, with Döhne, Guldenpfennig and Posselt finding safety at Bethany in the Orange Free State. Here Döhne lost his second wife on 23 September 1846. War and the unrest made it impossible for the missionaries to return to the Xhosa people, and instead set off for Natal. On their arrival in Pietermaritzburg conditions were tense. Döhne responded to an appeal from the European community without permission from the Berlin Mission Society, leading to the suspension of his services. With the closing of the Eastern Cape missions, the focus of the Berlin Missionary Society shifted to Natal and the Transvaal. Christianenberg, Emmaus and other mission stations were established there, and Döhne became a well-known figure among the Voortrekkers.

Döhne's third wife was Caroline Elizabeth Wilhelmine Watermeyer (2 November 1817 - 13 March 1888 Paddock, Natal) whom he married on 23 June 1847. The couple produced nine children. During this period he founded the Table Mountain Mission station near Pietermaritzburg.

Döhne had his Zulu-English dictionary published in 1858 at the request of the Government. The Berlin Missionary Society, having a change of heart, persuaded Döhne to rejoin them, and he immediately set about translating the Bible into Zulu. He worked on this project for four years at his home, Wartburg, finishing the first four books of the New Testament. Disputes with a committee appointed by the Society to supposedly assist him, finally led to his resignation.

Döhne was not yet ready for retirement and started an independent Mission at Utrecht and another at Glencoe. He once again became a refugee, fleeing the Anglo-Zulu War of 1879.

The agricultural research station of Döhne near Stutterheim was named in his honour.

== Bibliography ==
- Döhne, A Zulu-Kafir Dictionary, etymologically explained, with copious Illustrations and examples, preceded by an introduction on the Zulu-Kafir Language. By the Rev. J. L. Döhne. Royal 8vo. pp. xlii. and 418, sewed, Cape Town, G.J. Pike's Machine Printing Office, 1857.
