= Potsdam, South Africa =

Potsdam
- Location within Eastern Cape Location within South Africa
- Coordinates: 32.9749°S 27.648°E
- Country: South Africa
- Province: Eastern Cape
- Municipality: Buffalo City

Area
  - Total: 4.14 km^{2} (1.60 sq mi)

Population (2011)
  - Total: 5,649
  - Density: 1,360/km^{2} (3,530/sq mi)

Racial makeup (2011)
  - Black African: 99.3%
  - Coloured: 0.3%
  - Indian/Asian: 0.4%

First languages (2011)
  - Xhosa: 96.7%
  - English: 1.5%
  - Other: 1.8%
- Time zone: UTC+2 (SAST)
- Postal code (street): 7441

Potsdam is a town in Buffalo City in the Eastern Cape province of South Africa.
