= British German Legion =

German soldiers fighting for Britain in Crimean War

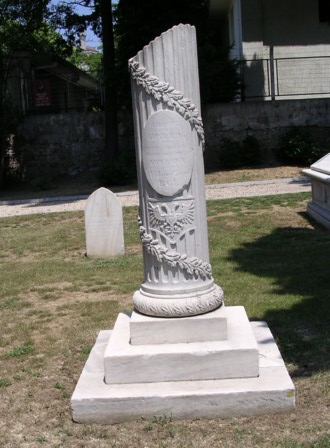
Memorial for members of the British German Legion in the British cemetery at Haydarpaşa, Istanbul

The British German Legion (or Anglo-German Legion) was a group of German soldiers recruited to fight for Britain in the Crimean War. It is not to be confused with the King's German Legion, which was active during the Napoleonic Wars. Great Britain raised a British German Legion of two regiments of light dragoons, three Jäger Corps, and six regiments of light infantry; a British Italian Legion of five regiments of infantry, and a British Swiss Legion of three regiments of light infantry. At the end of the war, the soldiers were entitled to return to their country of origin at the public expense, but some, fearing a hostile reception at home, settled in the Cape of Good Hope.

The head of the Legion was Major General Richard von Stutterheim.

The British government funded and gave material support to von Stutterheim to recruit soldiers into the Legion. In March 1855, von Stutterheim began raising the Legion by hiring 200 agents in Germany to recruit soldiers, focusing mostly on port cities. The recruiters would go to taverns, buy beer for young men and recruit them once they were inebriated. It is believed that Stutterheim was paid US$40 (equivalent to about US$1,433 in 2025) for each recruit, paying US$20 to each recruit and pocketing the other US$20, thereby earning himself US$120,000 (equivalent to about US$4.3 million in 2025) in the process.

On 16 July 1856, members of the Legion were involved in a fracas with British soldiers in the camp at Aldershot in Hampshire which quickly developed into a major riot fought with stones, sticks and bayonets and leading to about 50 men receiving hospital treatment. Though both sides were equally to blame, the men of the British German Legion were billeted at Barrack field in Colchester Garrison, where many married local women.

It was disbanded in November 1856, having seen little or no military action due to the war having ended. Facing difficulties in repatriation by having served a foreign country, most of the members of the Legion were resettled in the Eastern Cape Colony, in South Africa. As a result, to this day there are place names of German origin in the area around King William's Town, including the town of Stutterheim.

Following the outbreak of the Indian Rebellion of 1857, a substantial number of ex-Legion soldiers volunteered for service in India and were formed into a "Jäger Corps". In January 1860, 560 of them volunteered for transfer to the 3rd Bombay European Regiment, shortly afterwards taken into regular British service as the 109th Regiment of Foot (Bombay Infantry). Even into the late 1870s, "there was an unmistakably German atmosphere about the Regiment"; the commanding officer, a company commander, and many of the senior non-commissioned officers were all formerly of the German Legion, and the regiment had to explicitly forbid the use of German rather than English.

== General references ==
- Bayley, Charles Calvert (1977). Mercenaries for the Crimea: the German, Swiss, and Italian Legions in British Service, 1854-1856. Montreal: McGill-Queen's University Press. ISBN 0-7735-0273-4.

== Sources ==
- Baggs, A P; Board, Beryl; Crummy, Philip; Dove, Claude; Durgan, Shirley; Goose, N R; Pugh, R B; Studd, Pamela; Thornton, C C (2024) [1994]. Cooper, Janet; Elrington, C R (eds.). Barracks. A History of the County of Essex (Report). Vol. 9. London: Borough of Colchester. pp. 251–255 – via British History Online.
- Christodoulou, Glenn (1985). Aldershot and the Crimean War. Crimean War Research Society.
- French, J.H. (December 1975). Kinsey, H.W. (ed.). "Baron Richard von Stutterheim". Military History Journal. 3 (4). The South African Military History Society.
- Tankard, Keith (14 October 2009). "The Eastern Cape's German Settlers: Chapter 3: The German Military Settlers". The New Labyrinth of East London Lore. Archived from the original on 10 July 2011.
- Westphal, William (1892). Ten years in South Africa. Only complete and authentic history of the British German legion in South Africa and the East Indies (1892). Chicago, USA: B.S. Wasson & Co.
- Whitton, Frederick Ernest (1924). The History of the Prince of Wales's Leinster Regiment (Royal Canadians): Volume 1: The Old Army.
