= Stutterheim =

- Town
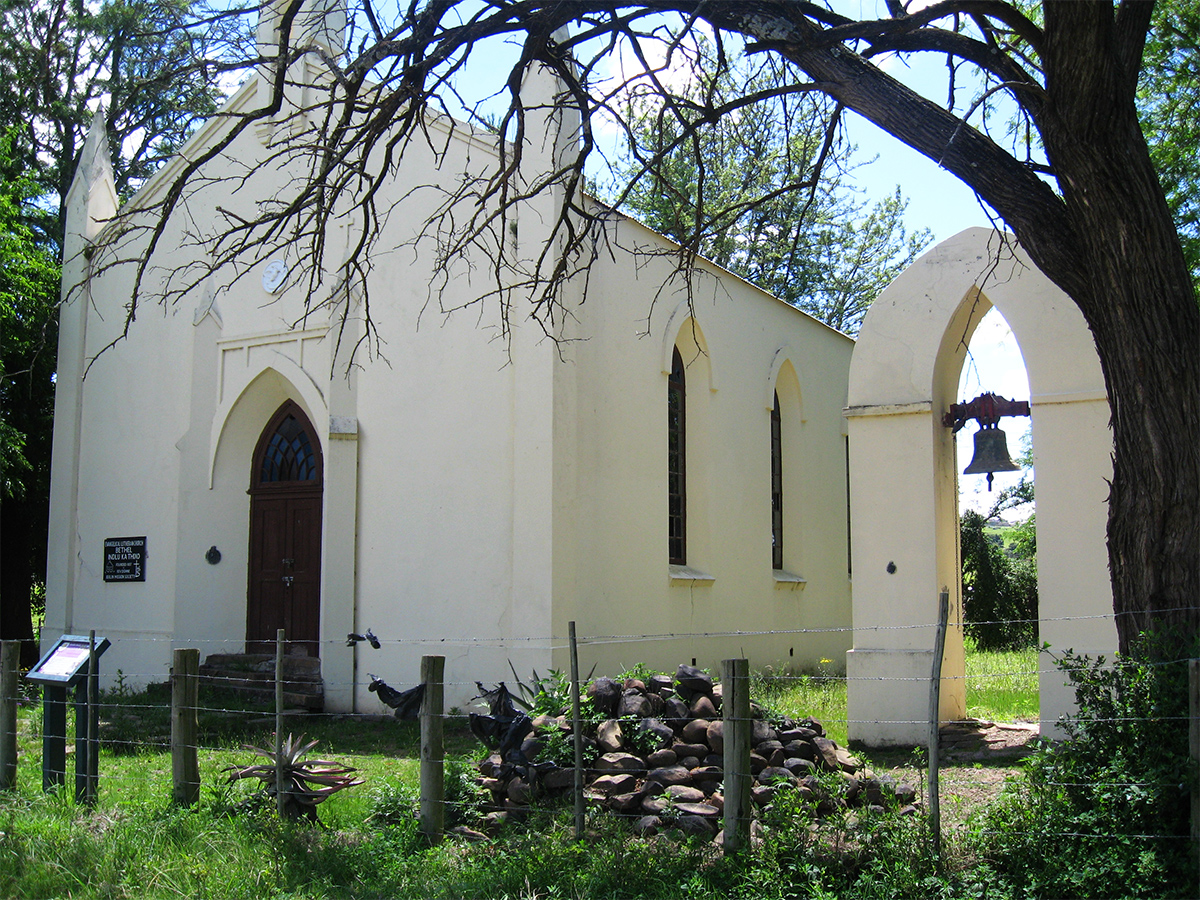
- Bethel Mission Church, Stutterheim

- Location within Eastern Cape Location within South Africa Location within Africa
- Coordinates: 32°34′S 27°25′E
- Country: South Africa
- Province: Eastern Cape
- District: Amathole
- Municipality: Amahlathi

Area
  - Total: 121.42 km^{2} (46.88 sq mi)

Population (2011)
  - Total: 24,673
  - Density: 203.20/km^{2} (526.30/sq mi)

Racial makeup (2011)
  - Black African: 90.7%
  - Coloured: 4.4%
  - Indian/Asian: 0.2%
  - White: 4.5%
  - Other: 0.3%

First languages (2011)
  - Xhosa: 87.4%
  - Afrikaans: 5.8%
  - English: 5.0%
  - Other: 1.8%
- Time zone: UTC+2 (SAST)
- Postal code (street): 4930
- PO box: 4930
- Area code: 043

Stutterheim is a town with a population of 46,730 in South Africa, situated in the Border region of the Eastern Cape province. It is named after Richard von Stutterheim.

== History ==
The area's earliest human population were Bushmen. Khoikhoi groups roamed the area with their cattle before Xhosa groups moved in during the mid-17th century CE. Missionaries arrived in the area in the 1830s from the Berlin Missionary Society, followed by German settlers from the 1850s, and further waves of English colonists later on.

The town was originally named for Baron Richard Carl Gustav Ludwig Wilhelm Julius von Stutterheim, who became a major-general in the British Army as the head of the British German Legion and spent eight months in South Africa before returning to Germany. It was later renamed Dohne after the first missionary in the area, Jacob Ludwig Döhne, but in 1857 it was reverted to its previous name, with the name Döhne referring only to a small station nearby. The Cape Colony received a degree of independence in 1872 when Responsible Government was declared and, in 1877, the government of Prime Minister John Molteno began construction of the railway line connecting Stutterheim to East London on the coast. This was officially opened in August 1878, and led to significant growth and economic development in and around the town.

On 20 May 1879 Stutterheim was proclaimed a municipality. Today Stutterheim is part of a much larger municipality named Amahlathi Local Municipality.

== Economy and tourism ==
Due to its fair annual rainfall, Stutterheim is a flourishing forestry centre which includes large pine, gum and wattle plantations that are established on the slopes of the Kologha Mountains. This scenic town is situated about 70 km from East London on the N6 highway to the north. It is the home of many picturesque hiking trails, as well as mountain streams. Nearby Gubu Dam is well-stocked with trout. A number of cattle and sheep stud farms are also to be found in Stutterheim. Wool, beef, dairy and poultry are other central products which the area yields.
