= Mzimvubu to Keiskamma Water Management Area =

Mzimvubu to Keiskamma WMA, or Mzimvubu to Keiskamma Water Management Area (coded: 12), includes the following major rivers: the Swane River, Mntafufu River, Mzimvubu River, Mngazi River, Mthatha River, Xora River, Mbashe River, Nqabara River, Gqunube River, Buffalo River, Nahoon River, Groot Kei River and Keiskamma River, and covers the following Dams:

- Binfield Park Dam on Tyhume River
- Bridle Drift Dam on Buffalo River
- Doornrivier Dam on Doorn River
- Gcuwa Dam on Gcuwa River
- Gubu Dam on Gubu River
- Laing Dam on Buffalo River
- Lubisi Dam on Indwe River
- Nahoon Dam on Nahoon River
- Ncora Dam on Tsomo River
- Oxkraal Dam on Oxkraal River
- Rooikrantz Dam on Buffalo River
- Sandile Dam on Keiskamma River
- Mthatha Dam on Mthatha River
- Waterdown Dam on Klipplaat River
- Wriggleswade Dam on Kubisi River
- Xilinxa Dam on Xilinxa River
- Xonxa Dam on White Kei River

== Boundaries ==
Primary drainage regions R and S, and also tertiary drainage regions T11 to T13, T20, T31 to T36, T60, T70, T80 and T90.

== See also ==
- Water Management Areas
- List of reservoirs and dams in South Africa
- List of rivers of South Africa
