= Bulhoek massacre =

1921 massacre in South Africa

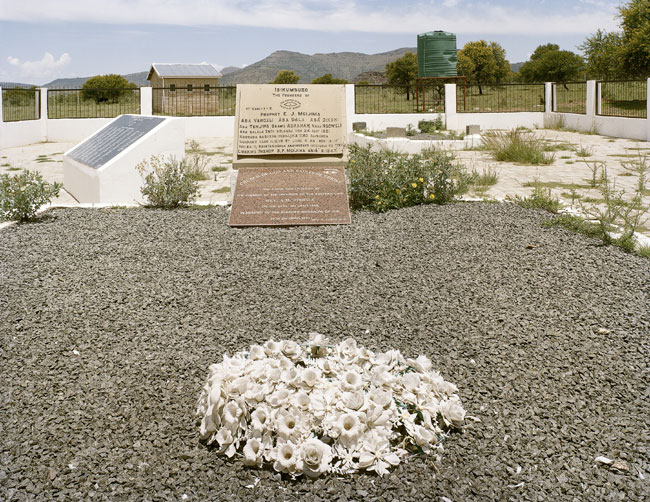

In the Bulhoek massacre, a solely white (both Afrikaner and English-speaking) police force in the Union of South Africa killed 163 Xhosa civilians. The massacre occurred on 24 May 1921, in the village of Ntabelanga in the Cape Province (today part of Eastern Cape). After a dispute over land in Ntabelanga, dating back to 1920, an 800-strong police force from the Union of South Africa led by Colonel Johan Davey and General Koos van der Venter gathered at Ingxingwa Ye Nkunzini, in the Bulhoek valley, and Ingxingwa ka Stivini, Steven's Valley. At the same time 500 men known as the "Israelites", armed with spears and knobkerries, and led by Enoch Mgijima, gathered in an open field, ready to defend their families and community. After failed final negotiations between the two parties, a battle ensued. The 20-minute battle, which left an estimated 163 Israelites dead, 129 wounded and 95 taken as prisoners, became known as the Bulhoek Massacre.

== Preceding events ==
In 1912, Enoch Mgijima, a lay preacher and independent evangelist, broke away from the Wesleyan Methodist Church and joined the Church of God and Saints of Christ, a small church based in the United States of America. In November 1912, he began baptising his followers in the Black Kei River near his home in Ntabelanga. Towards the end of 1912, Mgijima predicted that the world would end on Christmas, after 30 days of rain. As a result of his predictions, his followers stopped working and came to join this communal living settlement. Over the years Mgijima's visions displayed a future full of violence. He was asked to renounce his visions by the leaders of the church as they could not condone the preaching of conflict and war, but Mgijima refused and was excommunicated. In 1914, the South African Church of God and Saints of Christ split, with one of the group following Enoch Mgijima, taking on the name of the "Israelites", in keeping with the Old Testament with which their beliefs aligned.

One of the prophecies that led to his expulsion was a prophecy of World War I. He saw a vision of two goats fighting and a chacma baboon watching nearby. He interpreted it as a war of whites where blacks will not be involved in that war. This was later to be universally known as the First World War, 1914–1918. However, many black South Africans fought in the war, both in the East African Campaign (World War I) and outside Africa, as part of British and French colonial forces.

Born and raised in the Bulhoek area, Mgijima erected a building to be used for religious ceremonies by his followers on a piece of land that he owned. As his followers grew, he built a larger structure and eventually had to make alternative plans for Passover celebrations. Mgijima was granted permission to host the event at the Shiloh Mission Station in 1917. In 1918, Mgijima had to search for an alternative venue after the mission station denied him permission. This was due to the fact that one of his followers had broken a mission station rules, which decreed that only evangelists could lead church meetings.

Mr. G. E. Nightingale, the Government Inspector of African locations at Kamastone granted permission for commonage at the Kamastone sub-section. In 1919, after Mgijima didn't get permission to host the festival at the same location, he was given permission to host it at Ntabelanga, in the Bulhoek sub-section. After the Passover festival, some of Mgijima's followers remained on the piece of land and began building settlements in the area.

Mr. Nightingale became aware of the squatters in the area after visiting the area in January 1920 and asked Mgijima about it. Mgijima assured him this was a temporary arrangement and the squatters would move as soon as the Passover of 1920 was over. This did not happen as more Israelites gathered on the land. Mgijima extended the period and informed Nightingale that the Passover would take place on 18 June 1920. As time passed, more and more Israelites started squatting in the area.

A census was planned to get the squatters to move from the area. On 7 and 8 December 1920 the Senior Magistrate of Queenstown, ECA Welsh, visited Ntabelanga accompanied by 100 police officers under the command of Major Hutchons from Grahamstown. The police force set up their tents 500 metres from the Israelites. The Israelites refused to take part in the census claiming that God knew their numbers.

The white farmers of nearby Oxkraal complained when their grazing land was no longer available and the farmers complained because they said the Israelites were stopping their workers from working. By now the Israelites had exhausted their supplies and began stealing cattle from the local farmers. Clashes between the Israelites and the local farmers occurred with two Israelites being shot by John Mattushek and his servant, Mr. Klopper, who were both arrested but later released.

After a group of “moderate” Africans from the Eastern Cape – comprising J T Jabavu, Meshach Pelem, Patrick Xabanisa and Chief Veldtman – sent by the government failed to get the Israelites off the land, a group of high-ranking government officials met with the Israelite leaders in Queenstown on 17 December 1920. The meeting was unfruitful.

By 1921, there were about 3000 Israelites from all over the country living at Ntabelanga. The newly appointed Native Affairs Commission, sent by Prime Minister Jan Smuts, along with Charles Mgijima, Enoch Mgijima's brother, nephew and another high-ranking church member, held a meeting between 6–8 April 1921. The meeting was unsuccessful as the Israelites continued to occupy the land. On 21 May 1921, with an 800-men strong police force assembled in Queenstown, Colonel Truter sent Mgijima an ultimatum to evacuate the squatters from the land by 23 May 1921.

In response, Mgijima sent Silwana Nkopo and Samuel Matshoba to deliver a letter to Colonel Truter, in which he reiterated his refusal to move from the land and reaffirmed his faith in God to resolve the matter on the Israelite's behalf on 22 May 1921.

== Massacre ==
On 24 May 1921, armed with machine guns, a cannon and artillery, an 800-strong police force led by Colonel Johan Davey and General Koos van der Venter stationed at the Ntabelanga mountains: Ingxingwa Ye Nkunzini, the Bulhoek valley, and Ingxingwa ka Stivini, Steven's Valley and 500 Israelites led by Mgijima clashed in Bulhoek. The battle started when the police force opened fire on the Israelites killing two of Mgijimis men, they retaliated. At the end of the 20-minute battle, an estimated 163 Israelites died, 129 were wounded and 95 were taken prisoner including Enoch Mgijima.

A total of 163 Israelites who were killed in the battle were buried at Bulhoek on the 25 May 1921.

Mgijima, his elder brother Charles, and Gilbert Matshoba were sentenced to five years' hard labour at DeBeer's Convict Station in Kimberley. A few were given suspended sentences, but the remaining 129 Israelites were sentenced to between 12 and 18 months hard labour. Mgijima was released from prison in 1924 and returned to leading the Israelites until his death on 5 March 1929.

== Response ==
The South African Native National Congress (SANNC), now known as the ANC, was hosting its ninth annual meeting since its formation in 1912 at Bloemfontein on the day of the massacre. The SANNC was opposed to the government's actions in Bulhoek, stating that it had failed to protect and respect the Israelites' religious beliefs. The SANNC came to a resolution that the Natives Land Act of 1913 was impracticable and that the government had failed to carry out its principles. According to the SANNC the Israelite sect had attracted people who had been pushed off their land by the 1913 Land Act. The Congress sent a telegram to Arthur Barlow, (Member of Parliament for Bloemfontein North) to request a parliamentary inquiry into the shootings. In commemoration of those who had passed, the SANNC adjourned the conference and undertook a Death March, after which a memorial service was held.

The Industrial and Commercial Workers Union (ICU) expressed its support for the slain Israelites, stating that the Israelites had been the victims of the 1913 Land Act. ICU secretary H. Selby Msimang wrote in support of the Israelites, "Man is not bound to confess loyalty to a tyrant. History has shown that the human soul naturally revolts against injustice."

In response to the massacre, a committee which represented townsmen and farmers in and around Queenstown, known as the Vigilance Committee of Queenstown, was set up. The committee argued that the government had been patient with the Israelites and that necessary steps had indeed been taken. They were later joined by the Queenstown branch of the Sons of England and Benevolent Society, which represented over a hundred Englishmen in Queenstown and various headmen from different areas in Kamastone, led by chief headman Rofana Mblingi.

The African newspapers, Imvo Zabantsundu and Umteteleli wa Bantu, were harsh on the Israelites, blaming the incident on the Israelites' inability to respond to the government's call to evacuate the land. The Star, called the Israelites "deluded people", and took a strong stand against the government while The Pretoria News attacked the SANCC for criticising the government and putting forward suggestions on how the government could have dealt with the Israelites only after the massacre had taken place. Die Burger stated its fears that the massacre could be viewed by natives in the same light as Afrikaners saw the Slachter's Nek Rebellion.

== Aftermath ==
The massacre resulted in a change in the state's response to prophetic movements. In 1922, the prophet Nontetha was arrested by authorities fearful of her growing popularity and anxious to avoid a repeat of the Bulhoek massacre. She was held in mental hospitals from 1923 until her death in 1935.

Contemporary adherents to Mgijima's teachings - still known in South Africa as the Israelites - host an annual pilgrimage on May 24 to the grave where the 193 Israelites were buried. Various South African departments and politicians have also visited the gravesite to pay their respects to the victims of the massacre.

On 3 August 2016, Tsolwana, Inkwanca and Lukhanji local municipalities were amalgamated to form Enoch Mgijima Local Municipality in honour of Enoch Mgijima. Towns like Hofmeyr, Molteno, Queenstown, Sada, Sterkstroom, Tarkastad and Whittlesea now fall under the municipality.

== See also ==
- Bisho massacre
- List of massacres in South Africa
- Marikana massacre
- Natives Land Act, 1913
- Sharpeville massacre
- War of Canudos

== Bibliography ==
- Wilfrid H. Harrison: The Bullhoek Massacre. In: W. H. Harrison: Memoirs of a Socialist in South Africa 1903-1947. Stewart Printing, Cape Town 1950, pp. 73-81.
- Vincent M. Master: Bullhoek (2). In: D. J. Potgieter (Ed.): Standard Encyclopaedia of Southern Africa, Vol. II. Nasou Limited, Cape Town 1970, pp. 585-586.
