= Komani River =

River in the Eastern Cape, South Africa

Komani River Komanirivier
- Location of the Komani River mouth

Location
- Country: South Africa
- Province: Eastern Cape Province

Physical characteristics
- Source: Stormberg
  - location: Eastern Cape, South Africa
  - elevation: 1,400 m (4,600 ft)
- Source confluence: Swart-Kei / Wit-Kei
- Mouth: Confluence with Klaas Smits River
  - coordinates: 31°58′1″S 26°50′05″E
  - elevation: 1,020 m (3,350 ft)
- Length: 40 km (25 mi)

The Komani River, is a river part of the Great Kei River system in the Eastern Cape, South Africa. It is a short river originating north of Komani and joining up with the Klaas Smits River, just south of the same town.

The Bongolo Dam, is situated on the Komani River. Presently this river is part of the Mzimvubu to Keiskama Water Management Area.

== See also ==
- Great Kei River
- List of rivers of South Africa
