= Great Kei River =

River in the Eastern Cape, South Africa

Great Kei River Groot-Keirivier
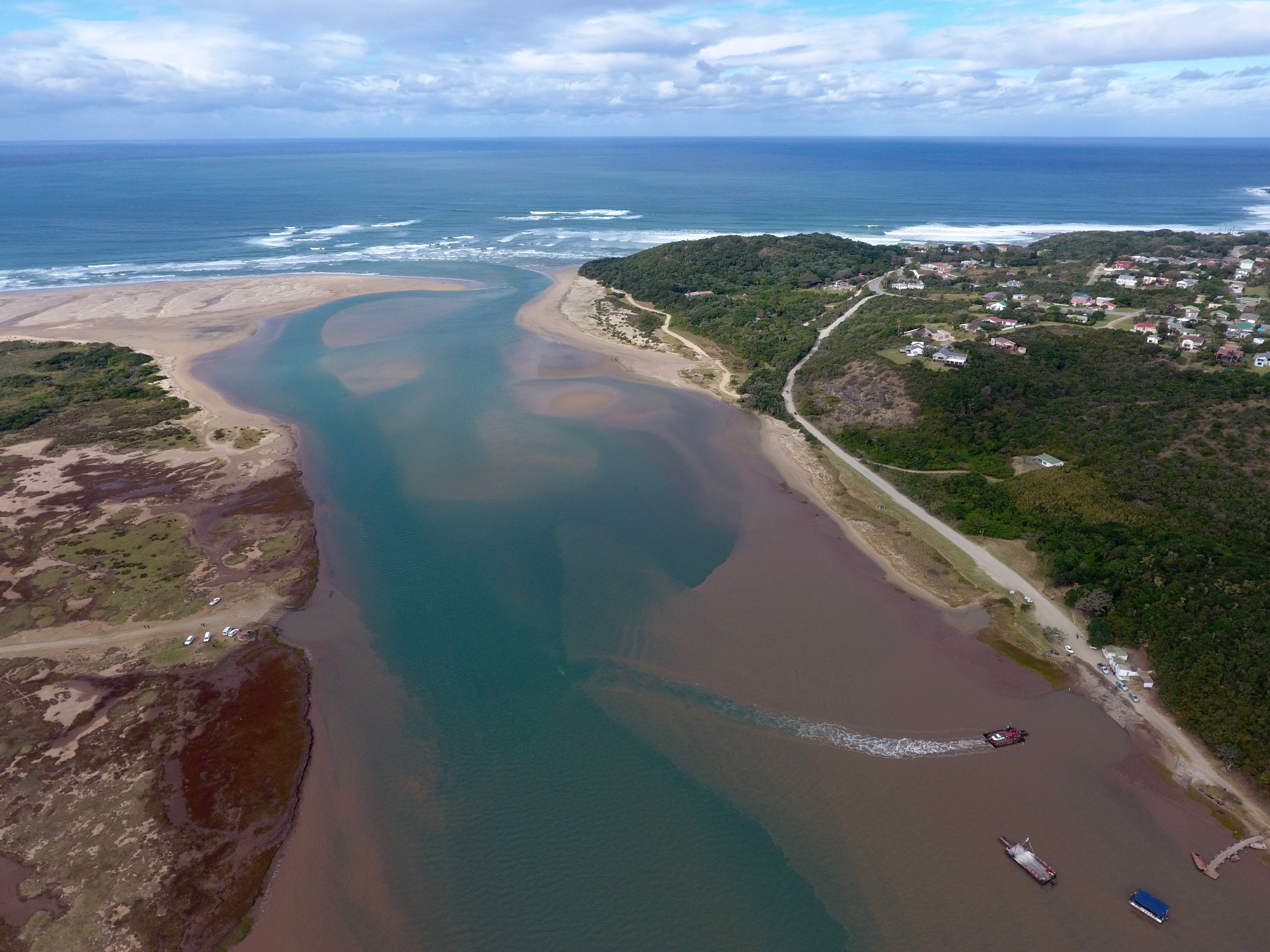
- Aerial photograph of the mouth of the Great Kei River as it meets the Indian Ocean. The river ferry allowing vehicles and passengers to cross the river can be seen in the foreground.

- Location of the Great Kei River mouth
- Etymology: From kei, the word for "water" in the Khoekhoe language

Location
- Country: South Africa
- Province: Eastern Cape Province

Physical characteristics
- Source: Stormberg Mountains
  - location: Eastern Cape, South Africa
  - elevation: 1,500 m (4,900 ft)
- Source confluence: Swart-Kei / Wit-Kei
  - coordinates: 32°13′34″S 27°30′36″E
  - elevation: 540 m (1,770 ft)
- Mouth: Indian Ocean
  - location: By Kei Mouth, South Africa
  - coordinates: 32°40′34″S 28°22′51″E
  - elevation: 0 m (0 ft)
- Length: 320 km (200 mi)

Basin features
- Tributaries
  - left: Xolobe
  - right: Kubusi

The Great Kei River is a river in the Eastern Cape province of South Africa. It is formed by the confluence of the Black Kei River and White Kei River, northeast of Cathcart. It flows for 320 km (199 mi) and ends in the Great Kei Estuary at the Indian Ocean with the small town Kei Mouth on the west bank. Historically the Great Kei River is the birthplace of AmaKwai Clan formed the southwestern border of the Transkei region as was formerly known as the Nciba River.

== Course ==
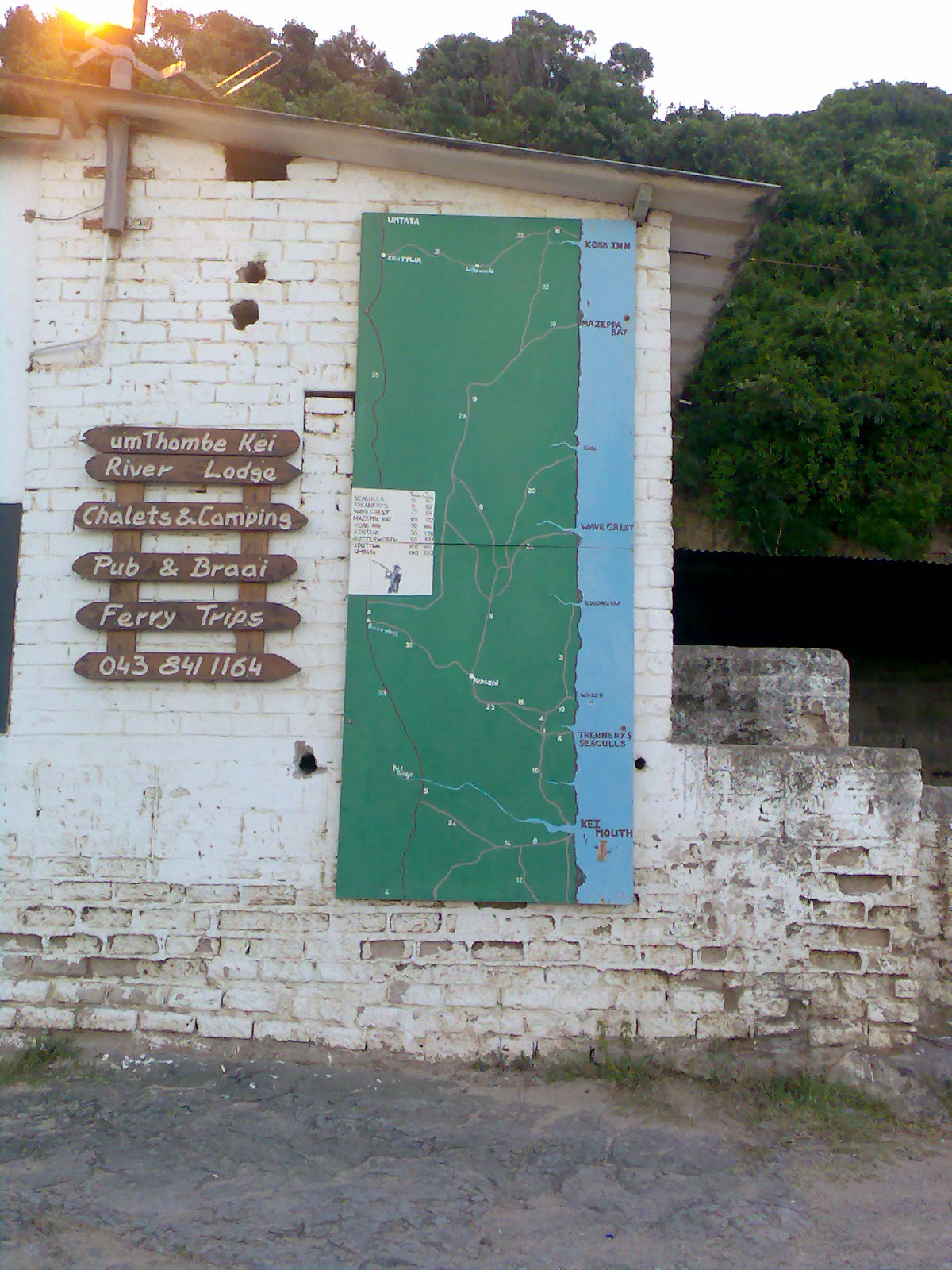
Map of Great Kei River from Kei Bridge to Kei Mouth

The Great Kei River is a meandering river course and is formed by the convergence of the Black Kei River and the White Kei River in Enoch Mgijima Local Municipality, north-east of Cathcart and southeast of Queenstown. The Great Kei river flows from the junction of the Black and White Kei rivers for approximately 225 kilometers (140 miles) southeastwards along winding courses to the Indian Ocean. It terminates at the Great Kei estuary by Kei Mouth, a coastal resort town. Its longest tributary is the Tsomo in the north. The name has it origins as far back as 1752 and is based on a Khoisan word for the river meaning 'sand'.

The Great Kei previously formed the southwestern border of the Transkei region which can be accessed via the 'Pont', one of only two car-transporting river ferries in South Africa. The pont is currently operational and motorists are frequently ferried from the southwestern bank to the northeastern bank into the Wild Coast.

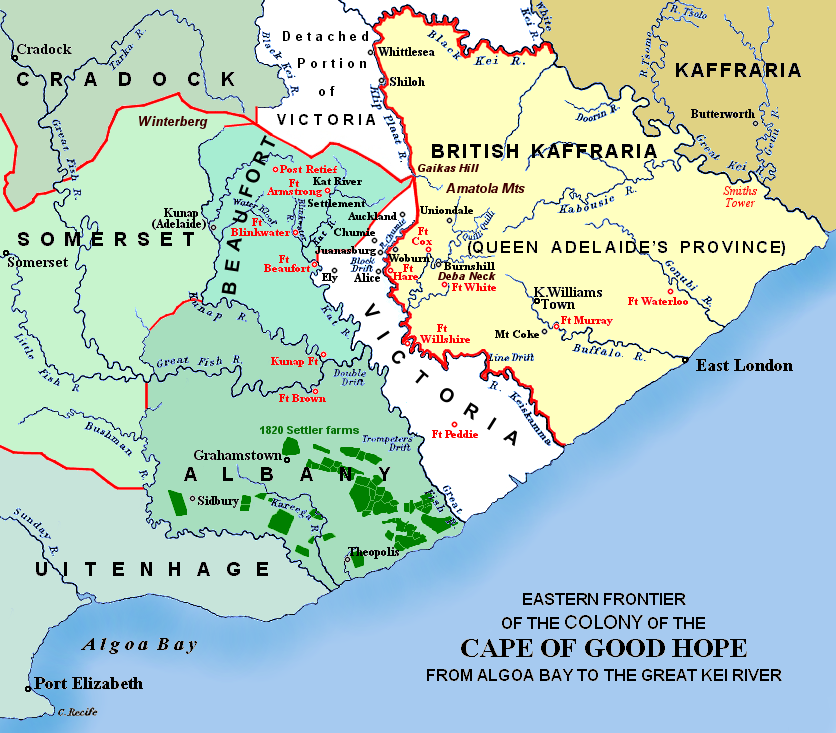
Map of the Great Kei River during the Frontier wars

== Climate ==
The estuaries from the Great Kei river to southern Mozambique are classified as subtropical. These systems are characterized by warm waters of more than 16 degrees Celsius. The climate is warm and humid almost year-round as a result. Minimum winter temperatures range from 12 – 14 degrees Celsius and the area receives rainfall throughout the year.

== Ecology ==
The inland sections of the Great Kei River flow through Albany thickets and Forest biomes, terminating in Indian coastal thicket at its mouth. The Kei river mouth hosts the southernmost naturally occurring mangrove forests in Southern Africa. Swamp forests occur north of the Mngazana estuary, and salt marshes are found south of the Great Kei estuary. The Great Kei river mouth is popular with anglers due its variety of estuarine fish species. However, some species such as the South African Cob and White steenbras are critically endangered. Many coastal bird species are found in the area such as the near-threatened African oystercatcher, sandpipers, and kingfishers.

== Rail Bridge ==
Attempts to build a bridge over the Kei river started in 1877 when building materials were shipped into East London from Britain by ox wagon and rail. Work on the bridge was interrupted multiple times due to conflicts in the area including the 9th Frontier War where Newey and his team were forced to retreat to the Royal Hotel in Komga as Gcaleka warriors began crossing the Kei for battle. A few British soldiers were killed by Xhosa warriors at Moordenaarskop (Murderers’ Hill), a hill close to the old bridge. From 1907 to 1917, a railway line was carried on a timber bridge downstream of the Great Kei. The timber bridge was destroyed after a flood and the railway line was relocated over to a new adjacent road bridge. The bridge was again dismantled in 1946 and re-erected again in 1947. It took two and a half years to complete the building of the bridge. At the end of the conflicts, the bridge was completed and is still in use by locals and farmers. The Great Kei Bridge is next to the Kei Bridge and is located in Amathole District Municipality. The Great Kei Bridge has a length of about 0.46 kilometres.

== Dams in the Great Kei basin ==
- Xonxa Dam in the White Kei River (Wit-Kei River).
- Wriggleswade Dam on the Kubusi River
- Bongolo Dam, in the Komani River, a tributary of the Klaas Smits River, itself a tributary of the Black Kei River

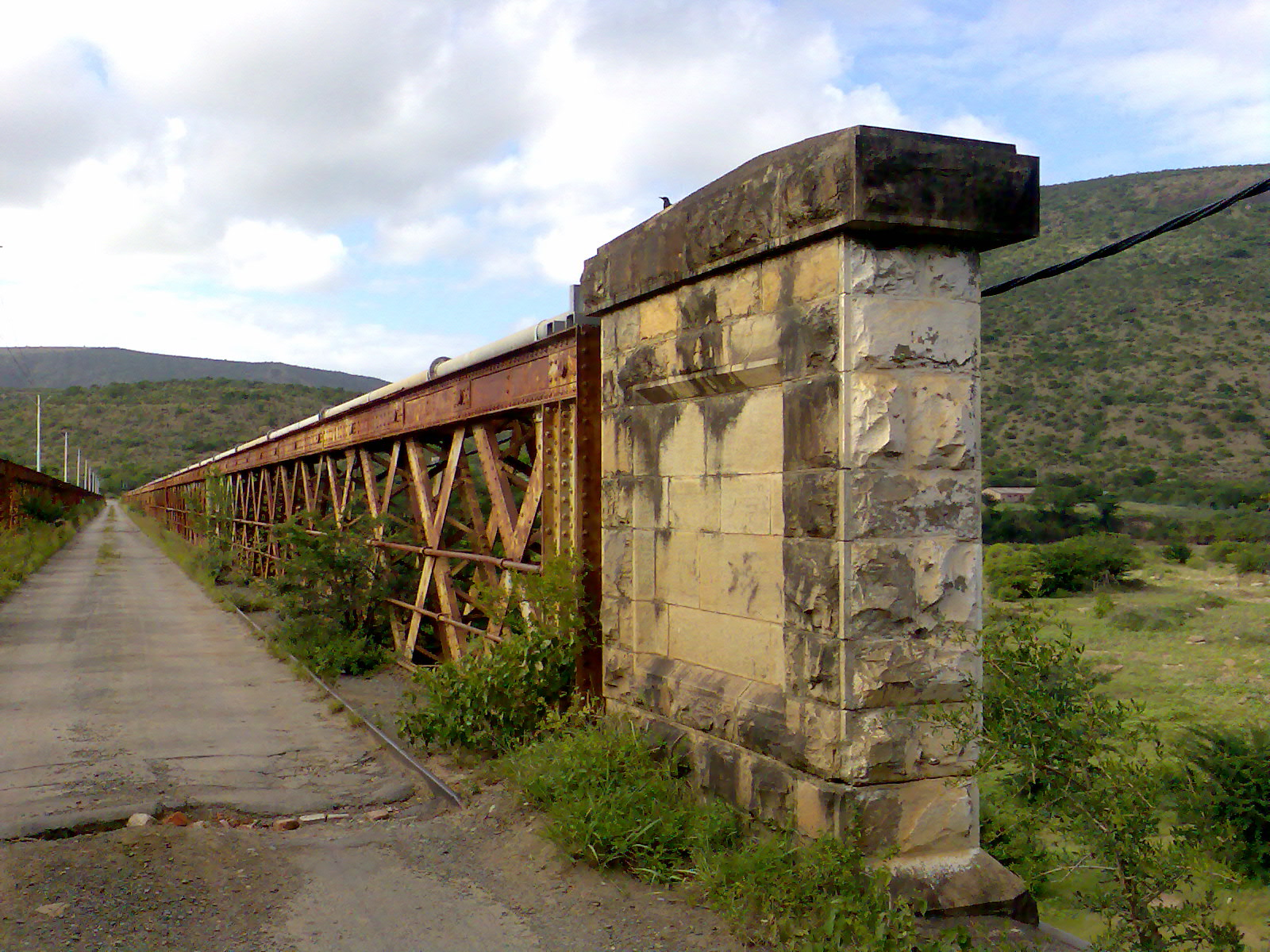
The Old road bridge on the Great Kei River

== Great Kei Pass ==
The N2 road passes through Komga and Butterworth in an area is known as the Great Kei Pass or Kei Cuttings. It is a known for its high prevalence of accidents due to mist and wandering cattle. This section of the N2 passes across the Great Kei River. The Kei Cuttings lie inland from the Kei Mouth, Morgans Bay and Chintsa West.

== See also ==
- List of rivers of South Africa
- List of estuaries of South Africa
