= Sada, South Africa =

Sada
- Location within Eastern Cape Location within South Africa
- Coordinates: 32°11′50″S 26°49′0″E
- Country: South Africa
- Province: Eastern Cape
- District: Chris Hani
- Municipality: Enoch Mgijima

Area
  - Total: 4.57 km^{2} (1.76 sq mi)

Population (2011)
  - Total: 13,493
  - Density: 2,950/km^{2} (7,650/sq mi)

Racial makeup (2011)
  - Black African: 99.3%
  - Coloured: 0.3%
  - Indian/Asian: 0.1%
  - Other: 0.2%

First languages (2011)
  - Xhosa: 95.1%
  - English: 2.0%
  - Other: 3.0%
- Time zone: UTC+2 (SAST)
- Postal code (street): n/a
- PO box: 5630

Sada is a semi-rural settlement, situated 3 km away from Whittlesea, 30 km north of Seymour and 40 km south of Queenstown, Eastern Cape Province, South Africa. The word Sada means "we/us" in the Khoikhoi language, a First language of the Eastern Cape. It also means "finally" or "at last" in isiXhosa because the first settlers struggled to find a place before they settled in the area in 1964.

== History ==
Sada, established in 1964, was one of the first forced resettlement camps established in the Hewu area. The settlement was established as a rural township for victims of forced removals from white-owned Sada from Shiloh's agricultural land in 1964. The land had been bought by the South African Bantu Trust (which was later renamed as the South African Development Trust) from Shiloh, an old Moravian mission station. The portion of land bought had been used as Shiloh's cattle post. The population of Sada was only made up of residents from the Whittlesea area but as time went on the initial population was later joined by other people evicted from farms in Tarkastad and Adelaide. By the time Sada was proclaimed as a self-contained Bantu town it had over 8,000 people.

According to a report by Mr F.O. Joseph, the Regional Secretary in the East London Institute of Race Relations said in a report published on Race Relations News in 1972 the shacks were replaced by four-roomed houses. There was a tap and pit latrine every 400 metres. The four-roomed houses were rented for R2,75 or R2,95 depending on whether there was a cement floor or not. Mr Joseph further stated that 46 men and 225 women were employed at vegetable gardens, brickyard, a dressmaking concern at the Moravia Mission and a handicraft while 572 men and 1000 women were unemployed.

In the early 1970s, displaced inhabitants erected tiny houses made of mud and established an extension of Sada, called Emadakeni (meaning The Mud Place in isiXhosa). Between 1974 and 1977 people arrived from Macibini Township, Glen Grey, Queenstown, Molteno, Cofimvaba, Port Alfred and as far as the Western Cape. Sada also provided a home for political activists who were banished from Transvaal after the Sharpeville Massacre, and ex-Robben Island prisoners settled in the area. Refugees from Herschel and Sterkspruit moved mostly to Thornhill, Glen Grey inhabitants resettled at the nearby Zweledinga, Oxton and Sada. 50 000-70 000 residents had arrived in Sada (and the Hewu area) within nine months, by April 1977. In 1979, Sada was incorporated into the Ciskei Bantustan. An urban zone, Dongwe or Ekuphumleni (Whittlesea North), consolidated Sada, absorbed those who did not receive rural land as well as the class of civil servants that had been emerging from the early 1980s. Despite political fights between students and the Ciskei government in the 1980s, the area was then incorporated into the Eastern Cape of the new South Africa in 1994.

== Economy ==
At the height of industrialisation in the 1980s, Sada was home to 8 factories owned by Taiwanese and some South Africans. These factories included Royal Textiles, Golden Knitting and Edward Frank Manufacturers which at some stage employed more than 1500 people. However, those factories are no longer existing. In the early 1990s SACTTWU led various strikes which saw the factories closing.

The area is supplied with water for human consumption and irrigation of agricultural crops by the Klipplaat River, that flows out of the Waterdown Dam stream-up. In the early 1990s the Shiloh farm which had been active in the 1980s was neglected. However, the scheme has been rejuvenated and now houses Nkosi Wines.

Whittlesea provides administrative and shopping facilities for the residents of Sada, and the Hewu Hospital is also located nearby.
