= Enoch Mgijima Local Municipality elections =

Local elections in the Eastern Cape, South Africa

The Enoch Mgijima Local Municipality council was established in 2016, and consists of sixty-eight members elected by mixed-member proportional representation. Thirty-four councillors are elected by first-past-the-post voting in thirty-four wards, while the remaining thirty-four are chosen from party lists so that the total number of party representatives is proportional to the number of votes received.

The largest town in the municipality is Komani (also known as Queenstown). It is named after Enoch Mgijima, a Xhosa prophet and evangelist, and survivor of the Bulhoek massacre.

In the election of 4 November 2026 the African National Congress (ANC) lost its majority, but won a plurality of 31 seats.

== Results ==
The following table shows the composition of the council after past elections.

Event	ANC	ATM	DA	EFF	UDM	Other	Total
2016 election	50	—	9	6	1	2	68
2021 election	44	1	7	6	1	9	68
2026 election	31	2	11	4	—	20	68

== August 2016 election ==
The following table shows the results of the 2016 election.

Party	Ward			List			Total seats
Party	Votes	%	Seats	Votes	%	Seats	Total seats
African National Congress	48,234	74.29	32	47,997	73.33	18	50
Democratic Alliance	8,399	12.94	2	8,710	13.31	7	9
Economic Freedom Fighters	5,119	7.88	0	5,142	7.86	6	6
United Front of the Eastern Cape	1,085	1.67	0	1,111	1.70	1	1
United Democratic Movement	704	1.08	0	954	1.46	1	1
Congress of the People	630	0.97	0	840	1.28	1	1
Independent Ratepayers Association of SA	353	0.54	0	218	0.33	0	0
Pan Africanist Congress of Azania	152	0.23	0	336	0.51	0	0
Freedom Front Plus	140	0.22	0	142	0.22	0	0
Independent candidates	111	0.17	0				0
Total	64,927	100.00	34	65,450	100.00	34	68
Valid votes	64,927	98.53		65,450	98.49		
Invalid/blank votes	966	1.47		1,003	1.51		
Total votes	65,893	100.00		66,453	100.00		
Registered voters/turnout	123,599	53.31		123,599	53.76		

== November 2021 election ==
The following table shows the results of the 2021 election.

Party	Ward			List			Total seats
Party	Votes	%	Seats	Votes	%	Seats	Total seats
African National Congress	33,057	60.53	32	34,676	63.81	12	44
Democratic Alliance	5,939	10.88	1	5,700	10.49	6	7
Economic Freedom Fighters	3,997	7.32	0	4,565	8.40	6	6
The Independents	3,033	5.55	0	4,196	7.72	5	5
Independent candidates	5,521	10.11	1				1
Independent South African National Civic Organisation	666	1.22	0	2,323	4.27	2	2
United Democratic Movement	569	1.04	0	738	1.36	1	1
Patriotic Alliance	582	1.07	0	560	1.03	1	1
African Transformation Movement	353	0.65	0	549	1.01	1	1
Pan Africanist Congress of Azania	320	0.59	0	386	0.71	0	0
Congress of the People	290	0.53	0	251	0.46	0	0
Freedom Front Plus	160	0.29	0	153	0.28	0	0
Progressive Front of South Africa	92	0.17	0	140	0.26	0	0
African Multicultural Economic Congress	30	0.05	0	104	0.19	0	0
Total	54,609	100.00	34	54,341	100.00	34	68
Valid votes	54,609	97.95		54,341	97.38		
Invalid/blank votes	1,144	2.05		1,463	2.62		
Total votes	55,753	100.00		55,804	100.00		
Registered voters/turnout	118,637	46.99		118,637	47.04		

=== By-elections from November 2021 ===
The following by-elections were held to fill vacant ward seats in the period from November 2021.

Date	Ward	Party of the previous councillor	Party of the newly elected councillor
20 April 2022	33	African National Congress	Independent candidate
30 November 2022	33	Independent candidate	African National Congress
23 August 2023	25	African National Congress	African National Congress
4 Dec 2024	31	African National Congress	African National Congress

A by-election was held in ward 33 on 20 April 2022 after the court ordered a rerun due to irregularities. Independent candidate Ntombekhaya Kortman, who had lost by 4 votes in 2021, won the rerun. Kortman died later that year after an illness, and in a by-election held on 30 November, the ANC regained the seat.

== November 2026 election ==
The following table shows the results of the 2026 election.

Party	Ward			List			Total seats
Party	Votes	%	Seats	Votes	%	Seats	Total seats
African National Congress	27,709	43.43	26	28,588	44.48	5	31
Democratic Alliance	10,214	16.01	4	9,713	15.11	7	11
South African Communist Party	6,139	9.62	1	6,758	10.52	6	7
The Independents	4,522	7.09	2	7,117	11.07	4	6
Economic Freedom Fighters	3,369	5.28	0	3,468	5.40	4	4
ActionSA	1,693	2.65	0	1,838	2.86	2	2
African Transformation Movement	1,812	2.84	0	1,704	2.65	2	2
Patriotic Alliance	1,296	2.03	1	1,230	1.91	0	1
Independent candidates	2,203	3.45	0				0
African Independent Congress	1,647	2.58	0	529	0.82	1	1
Komani Progress Action	843	1.32	0	837	1.30	1	1
uMkhonto weSizwe Party	796	1.25	0	737	1.15	1	1
Hofmeyr Community Development Forum	586	0.92	0	599	0.93	1	1
Pan Africanist Congress of Azania	294	0.46	0	282	0.44	0	0
Labour Party	183	0.29	0	170	0.26	0	0
Afrika Mayibuye Movement	201	0.32	0	136	0.21	0	0
African Congress for Transformation	26	0.04	0	278	0.43	0	0
Iliso Labantu Movement for Social Change	67	0.11	0	86	0.13	0	0
Al Jama-ah	65	0.10	0	71	0.11	0	0
Organic Humanity Movement	102	0.16	0	28	0.04	0	0
African Movement Congress	31	0.05	0	96	0.15	0	0
Total	63,798	100.00	34	64,265	100.00	34	68
Valid votes	63,798	97.61		64,265	97.77		
Invalid/blank votes	1,564	2.39		1,463	2.23		
Total votes	65,362	100.00		65,728	100.00		
Registered voters/turnout	128,231	50.97		128,231	51.26		
