= Klaas Smits River =

River in the Eastern Cape, South Africa

Klaas Smits River Klaas Smitsrivier
- Location of the Klaas Smits River mouth

Location
- Country: South Africa
- Province: Eastern Cape Province

Physical characteristics
- Source: Stormberg
  - location: Near Molteno, Eastern Cape, South Africa
  - elevation: 1,800 m (5,900 ft)
- Source confluence: Swart-Kei / Wit-Kei
- Mouth: Confluence with Black Kei River
  - coordinates: 32°01′44″S 26°56′0″E
  - elevation: 1,003 m (3,291 ft)
- Length: 40 km (25 mi)

Basin features
- Tributaries
  - left: Komani River

The Klaas Smits River (Afrikaans: Klaas Smitsrivier) is a river part of the Great Kei River system in the Eastern Cape, South Africa. It originates south of Molteno and flows through Sterkstroom, first southwards and then southeastwards before joining up with the Black Kei River. Presently the Klaas Smits River is part of the Mzimvubu to Keiskama Water Management Area.

The Komani River is a tributary of the Klaas Smits, joining its left bank 5 km south of Queenstown.

The basin of this river saw much commando activity during the Second Boer War.

== See also ==
- Great Kei River
- List of rivers of South Africa
