= Dutch Reformed Church, Tarkastad =

Church in Tarkastad, South Africa

Dutch Reformed Church
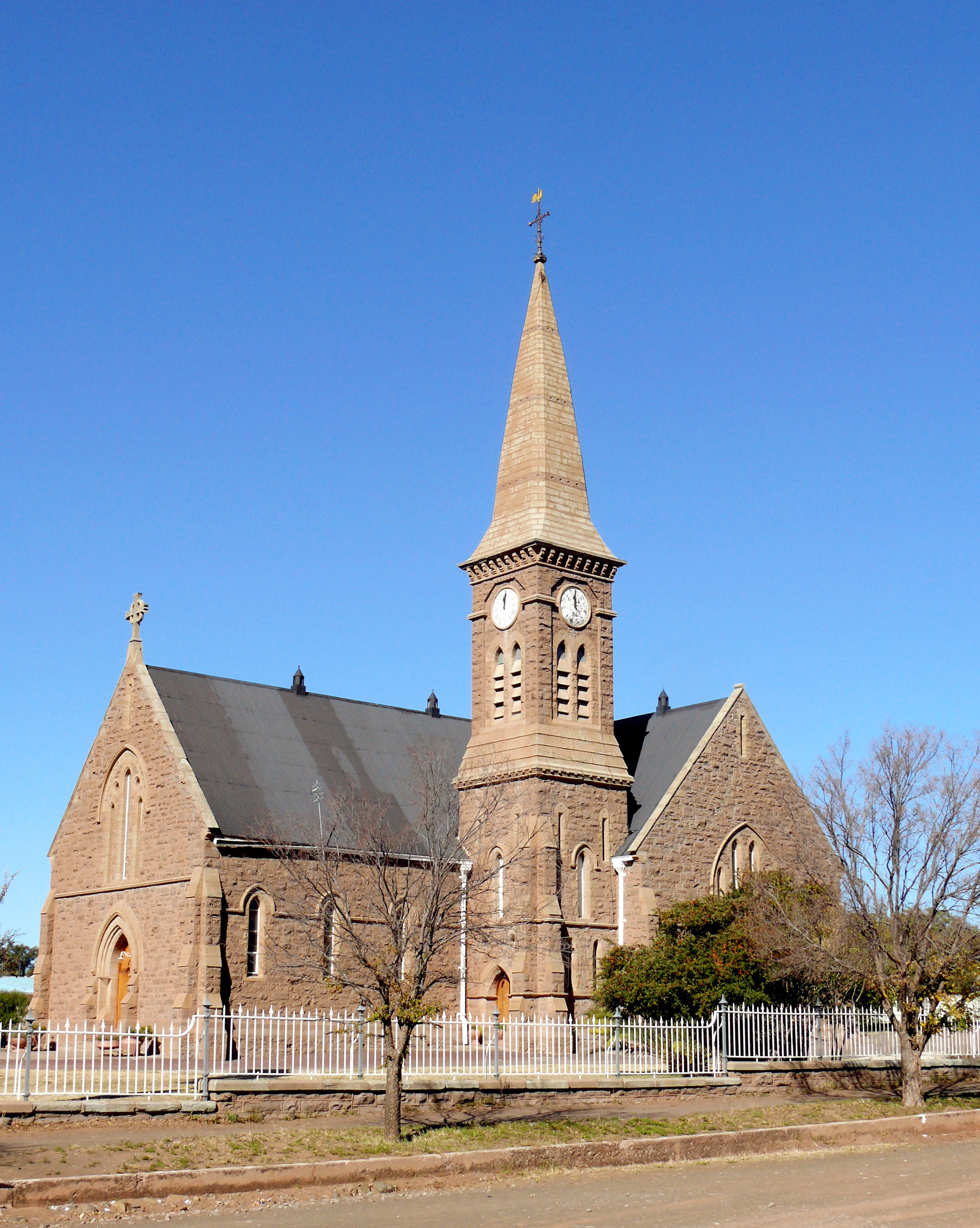
- Dutch Reformed Church
- 32.0080°S 26.2595°E
- Location: Tarkastad
- Country: South Africa
- Denomination: Nederduits Gereformeerde Kerk

History
- Founded: 1863

Architecture
- Functional status: Church

The Dutch Reformed Church in Tarkastad is the 23rd congregationof the Dutch Reformed Church that was founded in the present Synod of Eastern Cape, but currently (2015) it is the 19th oldest congregation because the congregations Middelburg, Komga, Greykerk and Alice, which are all older if Tarkastad was, no longer exists.

== Background ==
In 1952 writes Ons gemeentelike feesalbum album, an overview of all the congregations in the Dutch Reformed Church with a view to the Van Riebeeck Tercentenary Festival: "The Tarka area – that beautiful region in the shadow of the Winterberg – had its full share of the storms and struggle which shocked the national life during a century and a half."

About 26 km outside the town of Tarkastad lies the lonely grave of the victim of the Slachter's Nek Rebellion, Johannes Bezuidenhout, a few kilometers from the scene of his last hopeless struggle against the overwhelming power of government troops. The Butchers Neck Rebellion refers to Bezuidenhout, an Eastern Cape farmer's short-lived rebellion against British rule in the period 1815–1816. It is also considered one of the reasons for the origin of the Great Trek. The name Slagtersnek, where the rebels were captured, was taken from the British traders from Grahamstown who gathered here to buy the butchers from the farmers in the area. On a farm near what is today Somerset East, Frederik Bezuidenhout suspected a Khoikhoi worker by the name of Booi of theft and withheld his wages. Booi went to report Bezuidenhout for assault to the magistrate in Graaff-Reinet. Bezuidenhout twice refused to appear before the court and he was sentenced in absentia to one month's imprisonment on 5 October 1815.

The British government wanted to show its authority over the farmers in the far Eastern Frontier and sent a force of 12 Khoi-Khoi soldiers, then called Pandoers, with a white officer to Bezuidenhout's farm on 16 October 1815 to arrest him take. Bezuidenhout resisted and was shot dead by one of the Khoi-Khoi soldiers in a shelter between rocks on his farm. At his funeral, his brother Johannes Bezuidenhout swore revenge and together with a group of friends he planned an uprising against the British government in the Cape. They wanted to drive the British government and the Khoi-Khoi out of the Eastern Cape. They approached the Xhosa chief Gaika (also called Ngqika) for help and offered to receive the entire Zuurveld as payment. Gaika was not interested. Hendrik Prinsloo was shortly afterwards arrested by a force of 70, which included 40 English soldiers and 30 commando members.

The rebels tried unsuccessfully to unseat him and asked other farmers in the area to join the uprising. The rebels surrendered to the British forces at Slagtersnek on 18 November 1815. Johannes Bezuidenhout resisted arrest and was also shot dead. The result of the rebellion was that 32 rebels were banished from the Eastern Province and six of the rebel leaders were sentenced to death on 20 January 1816 on a charge of treason. One, Willem Krugel, was later pardoned by the Cape Governor, Lord Charles Somerset. On 9 March 1816, Hendrik Frederik Prinsloo, Stephanus Cornelis Bothma, Cornelis Johannes Faber, Theunis Christiaan de Klerk and Abraham Carel Bothma were publicly hanged.

== Ministers ==
- Johan George Steytler de Villiers, 1863–1886 (resigned; died on 20 June 1888)
- Dr. Johannes Petrus van Heerden, 1887–1893
- Helgard Müller, 1894–1897
- Dirk Johannes Jacobus van Velden, 1897–1904
- Daniel Jozua Pienaar, 1904–1912
- Johannes Francois Botha, 1912–1918
- Christian Rudolph Kotzé, 1918–1921
- Anthony George Eliab van Velden, 1922–1930
- Andries Hendrik Naudé, 1931–1944 (emeritus; died on 14 August 1914)
- Pieter Adriaan Verhoef, 1944–1946
- Dr. Erasmus Albertus Venter, 1947–1950
- Pieter Willem Jordaan, 1950–1958
- Jacobus Martinus Gerber, 1958–1961
- Ignatius Christiaan Schutte, 1962 – 25 February 1973 (when he accepted his emeritus)
- Johannes Jacobus de Wet, 1974–1979 (from 2004 to 2006 first pastor of Dana Bay)
- Jacobus Petrus Lodewiekus (Wiekus) van Straaten, 1999–2010
- Gerrit Vosloo, 2011–2013, accepted a call to Ermelo
- Lizette Viviers, 2013–present (come from Cathcart)
