= Klipplaat River =

River in the Eastern Cape, South Africa

Klipplaat River Klipplaat River
- Location of the Klipplaat River Mouth

Location
- Country: South Africa
- Region: Eastern Cape

Physical characteristics
- Source: Amatola Mountains
- Mouth: Confluence with Black Kei River
  - location: Near McBride Village
  - coordinates: 32°5′15″S 26°49′14″E

Basin features
- Tributaries
  - left: Brakkloofspruit

The Klipplaat River is a river in the Eastern Cape Province of South Africa.

== Course ==
The source of the 150 kilometres (93 mi) long Klipplaat River is in the Amathole Mountains (the highest mountains in the former Ciskei) near Cathcart. The river then winds its way through the Amathole's ridges and flows in a general northwesterly direction, passing the town Whittlesea in the former Ciskei before joining the right bank of the Black Kei River 22 km south of Queenstown. The Black Kei flows generally east and eventually joins the Wit-Kei River, to become the Great Kei River.

=== Dams ===
- Waterdown Dam

== See also ==
- List of rivers in South Africa
