= Thornhill, Eastern Cape =

Thornhill, Eastern Cape may refer to:

- Thornhill, Kouga
- Thornhill, Enoch Mgijima
