= Nontetha =

Xhosa religious leader in colonial South Africa (c. 1875–1935)

Nontetha Nkwenkwe (c. 1875 – May 20, 1935) was a Xhosa prophetess who lived in colonial South Africa and began a religious movement that caused her to be committed to asylums by the South African government from 1923 until her death in 1935. She is regarded as one of the most remarkable female religious leaders associated with independent churches in the 1920s.

== Life prior to 1918 ==
Nontetha Nkwenkwe was born in 1875 in King William's Town in what is now the Eastern Cape province of South Africa. She was of Xhosa descent, and settled in Khulile village, near Debe Nek, now part of Raymond Mhlaba Local Municipality. She served her community as an herbalist (ixhwele). She had ten children, five of whom lived to adulthood. Her husband, a migrant worker named Bungu Nkwenkwe, died while searching for work. She never joined a Christian church, but baptized her children and was influenced by the Ethiopian Church of Dwane as well as the American Methodist Episcopal Church.

== Rise to prominence ==
Following the outbreak of the influenza epidemic in 1918 which devastated her area, Nkwenkwe believed that she was spared for a divine purpose. She was first a seer, then a diviner, then a prophet. She began having visions and telling locals that God had told her the epidemic was punishment for people's sins, and that her mission was to reform society.

Due to a lack of formal education, Nkwenkwe was illiterate. While preaching, she would "read" the bible using her right hand, believing herself appointed as God's instrument. To reinforce her teachings, assistants followed them with relevant scriptures and personal affirmations. At first, her activities were welcomed by the authorities, unlike some of her contemporary male counterparts like Enoch Mgijima. Colonial authorities welcomed her because they understood her sermons to be encouraging her congregation to abstain from alcohol consumption, immorality, dances, and other traditional customs. Nkwenkwe’s movement grew rapidly in rural Ciskei, East London, Middledrift, and King William's Town (now Qonce).

By the 1920s, Nkwenkwe was middle-aged and was well-respected in the African community as a religious leader, herbalist, and head of household.

However, in the wake of the Bulhoek massacre where 183 African Israelites were killed at Bulhoek in 1921, the white settlers became increasingly paranoid about any large-scale gatherings of black South Africans. Officials reported that farm workers around Fort Beaufort had been "enraptured by her message and were reluctant to return to work". The government became suspicious of any independent black thinkers. Nkwenkwe's great-grandson, Mzimkhulu Bungu, believes that some established mission churches, worried about her growing following, had also complained about her activities.

Nkwenkwe's sermons also encouraged unity among educated and "red" (uneducated) Xhosa people in the Eastern Cape. This was oppositional to the colonial system's "divide and conquer" mechanism. According to South African historians Robert E. Edgar and Hilary Sapire, she was further accused of 'encouraging Africans to boycott white churches'. Authorities began to see her as subversive, and in 1922 she was arrested and imprisoned.

== Incarceration ==
Nkwenkwe continued to preach despite the terms of her release, and she was re-arrested in April 1923. Her arrest enraged her supporters, and in a show of solidarity, hundreds of her supporters gathered, ready to engage the authorities in the event that she was charged. Mindful of the disorder that could be unleashed by a possible court appearance, the authorities characterized Nkwenkwe as an "unstable psychiatric patient" and committed her to Fort Beaufort Mental Hospital. Her followers continued to consult with her, with some walking as far as 80 kilometres (50 mi). In 1924, she was transferred to the Weskoppies Mental Hospital in Pretoria, the government's prime psychiatric observation institution.

After two years without news on her condition, Nkwenkwe's supporters decided to visit their leader. On November 23, 1926, a group of her followers began a 55-day walk spanning 1,000 kilometres (620 mi) from the Eastern Cape to Pretoria. They picked up more people along the way until they reached their destination on 18 January 1927. A second pilgrimage in 1930 was cut short and the marchers loaded back onto trains after they crossed the Orange River at Aliwal North without passes.

Nkwenkwe died on May 20, 1935, of liver and stomach cancer. Her family was notified by telegram, but by the time they were able to respond, she had already been buried in an unmarked grave.

Her followers expressed their hope that one day Nontetha's remains would be returned. In 1997, Robert E. Edgar and Hilary Sapire began to assist in locating Nontetha's grave, and in 1998 her remains were reburied at her home in Khulile village.

== Legacy ==
Nkwenkwe not only established the Church of the Prophetess Nontetha, which has 30,000 members today, but also enhanced the role women held within the church in the 1920s.

== See also ==
- Bulhoek Massacre
- Khotso Sethuntsa
- Nongqawuse, prophet who precipitated the Xhosa cattle-killing movement and famine
- Nontsizi Mgqwetho
- Religion in South Africa and Christianity in South Africa
