= Black Kei River =

River in the Eastern Cape, South Africa

Black Kei River Swart-Keirivier
- Location of the Black Kei River mouth
- Etymology: From kei, the word for "water" in the Khoekhoe language

Location
- Country: South Africa
- Province: Eastern Cape Province

Physical characteristics
- Source: Stormberg
  - location: Eastern Cape, South Africa
  - elevation: 1,500 m (4,900 ft)
- Source confluence: Swart-Kei / Wit-Kei
- Mouth: Confluence with White Kei River
  - coordinates: 32°13′34″S 27°30′36″E
  - elevation: 540 m (1,770 ft)

Basin features
- Tributaries
  - left: Klaas Smits River
  - right: Klipplaat River

The Black Kei River, originates southwest of Queenstown, and eventually joins the White Kei River, to become the Great Kei River. Several villages are situated on its banks, including McBride Village, Qabi, Ntabelanga, Thornhill, Loudon, Mitford, Basoto, Baccle's Farm and Tentergate.

The Thrift Dam is its only significant reservoir. Presently this river is part of the Mzimvubu to Keiskamma Water Management Area.

Its upper reaches form the western boundary of the Tsolwana Nature Reserve, and during the mid-1800s, the Black Kei and its Klipplaat tributary formed the northern boundary of British Kaffraria. The Klaas Smits and Klipplaat rivers are its main tributaries.

== See also ==
- Great Kei River
- List of rivers of South Africa
