= Waterdown =

Waterdown may refer to:

- Waterdown (band), a German musical group
- Waterdown, Ontario, a suburb of the Canadian city of Hamilton

== See also ==
- Waterdown Dam, Whittlesea, South Africa
