= Mthatha River =

River in the Eastern Cape, South Africa

Mthatha River Umtata River
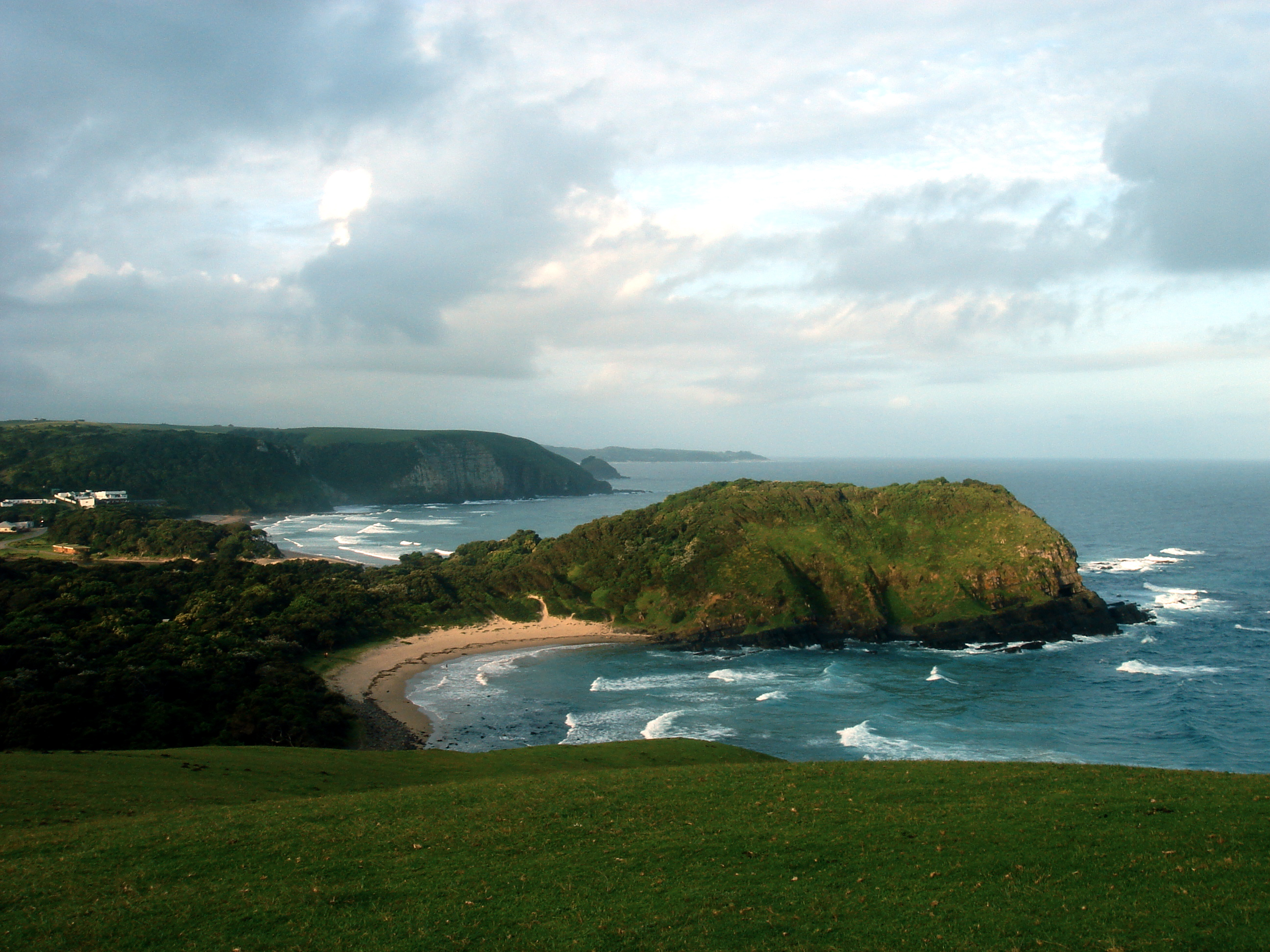
- close to where the Mthatha River meets the Indian Ocean

- Location of the Mthatha River mouth
- Etymology: Sneeze-wood trees (Ptaeroxylon obliquum) growing on the banks of the river
- Native name: uMthatha (Xhosa)

Location
- Country: South Africa
- Province: Eastern Cape Province

Physical characteristics
- Source
  - location: Baziya Range, Eastern Cape, South Africa
  - elevation: 1,500 m (4,900 ft)
- Mouth: Indian Ocean
  - location: Coffee Bay, South Africa
  - coordinates: 31°56′S 29°11′E
  - elevation: 0 m (0 ft)
- Length: 250 km (160 mi)
- Basin size: 2,600 km^{2} (1,000 sq mi)

Mthatha River or Umtata River (Xhosa: uMthatha) is a river in the Eastern Cape Province in South Africa. The river flows into the Indian Ocean in an estuary located near Coffee Bay. The Mthatha river flows in a southeastern direction and is approximately 250 km long with a catchment area of 2,600 km^{2}. Mthatha Town (Umtata) is named after it.

Its main tributaries are the Ngqungqu River and the Cicira River.

The Mthatha River marks the southern limit of the Pondoland region.

== Dams ==
Presently this river is part of the Mzimvubu to Keiskamma Water Management Area.

- Mthatha Dam
- Mabeleni Dam

== See also ==
- List of rivers of South Africa
- List of estuaries of South Africa
- List of dams and reservoirs in South Africa
