= Buffalo River (Eastern Cape) =

River in South Africa

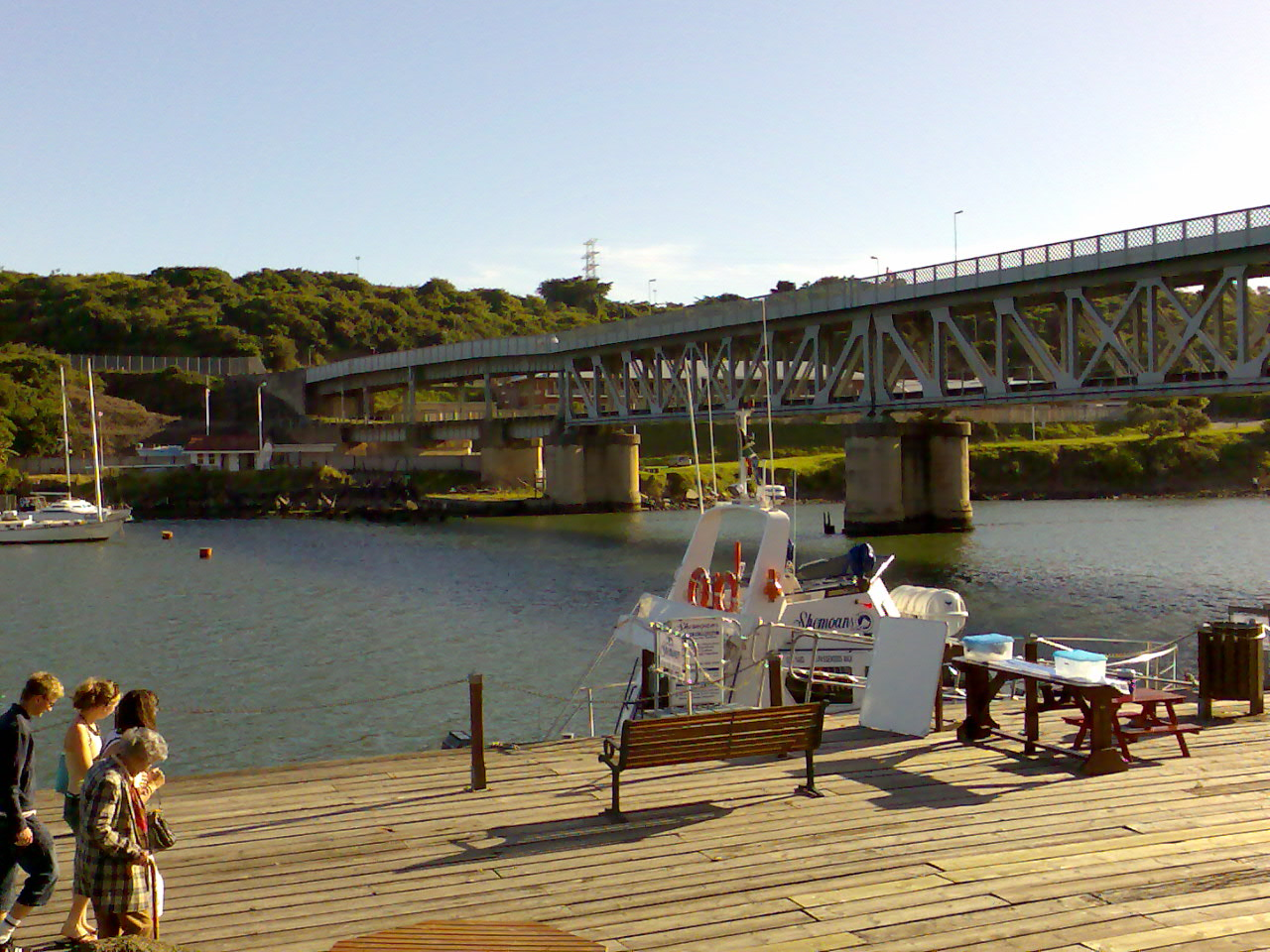
- Road and rail bridge on the Buffalo River

- Location of the Buffalo River's mouth
- Native name: Buffelsrivier (Afrikaans)

Location
- Country: South Africa
- State: Eastern Cape

Physical characteristics
- Source: Amatola Mountains
  - elevation: 1,200 m (3,900 ft)
- Mouth: Indian Ocean
  - location: East London
  - coordinates: 33°1′43″S 27°51′51″E
  - elevation: 0 m (0 ft)
- Length: 126 km (78 mi)
- Basin size: 1,287 km^{2} (497 sq mi)

Basin features
- Tributaries
  - left: Cwengcwe

The Buffalo River is a river in the Eastern Cape, South Africa. It is to the west of the Nahoon River.

== Course ==
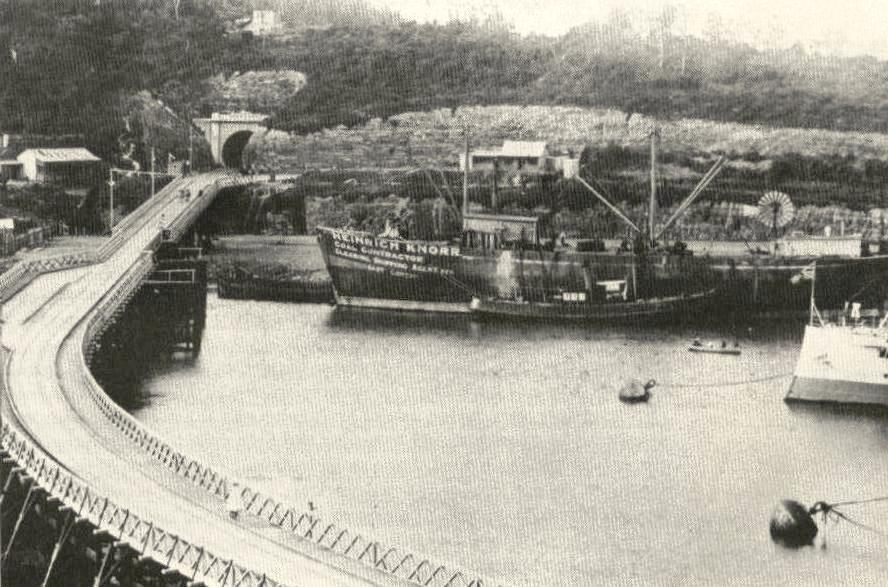
Original bridge over Buffalo River in East London built by the Molteno Government in the 1870s as part of its East London - Queenstown line

The Buffalo River has its source in the seeps and sponges of the Amatola Mountains at an altitude of 1200 m. The river is 126 kilometres long and drains a catchment of 1287 square kilometres. From its source, the river descends through indigenous forest in a deeply incised channel, flanked by rock cliffs up to 120 metres high. The quality of these headwaters is good. After only seven kilometres, the river faces its first obstruction, the small Maden Dam, built in 1910 (116 years old). Four kilometres downstream of Maden Dam, the much larger Rooikrantz Dam impounds about five million cubic metres. Rooikrantz Dam supplies water to King William's Town and the surrounding areas. Twenty kilometres from its source, at an altitude of 450 metres above mean sea level, the Cwengcwe River and Izele River join the Buffalo from the northeast. From here the river runs through undulating plains.

Two major tributaries from the west that join the middle section of the Buffalo River are the Mgqakwebe River just upstream of King William's Town and the Ngqokweni River at Zwelitsha. The other important tributary is the Yellowwoods River, which flows from the north directly into Laing Dam. When full, Laing Dam covers 203 hectares and contains 20 million cubic metres of water. From Laing Dam, the Buffalo River flows eastwards for 40 kilometres to Bridle Drift Dam, the largest impoundment on the river, with a full supply volume of 101 million cubic metres. Small streams on the northern bank bring runoff directly into Bridle Drift Dam from Mdantsane, the second largest township in Eastern Cape province.

From Bridle Drift Dam, the Buffalo River flows through low altitude coastal forest for twenty kilometres and forms the northern border of the Umtiza Nature Reserve, before entering the Indian Ocean through the estuary harbour of East London.

== Ecology ==
The endangered border barb lives in the waters of the Buffalo River. There is also a small population of the endangered Eastern Province rocky (Sandelia bainsii) in the Yellowwoods River, part of the Buffalo River basin.

Presently this river is part of the Mzimvubu to Keiskamma Water Management Area.

== Tributaries ==
Include the Mgqakwebe River, Ngqokweni River and Yellowwoods River, this last river includes some waterfalls the largest being the Yellowwoods Falls, near Breidbach.

== See also ==
- List of rivers of South Africa
- List of estuaries of South Africa
- Umtiza Nature Reserve
