= Nahoon River =

River in the Eastern Cape, South Africa

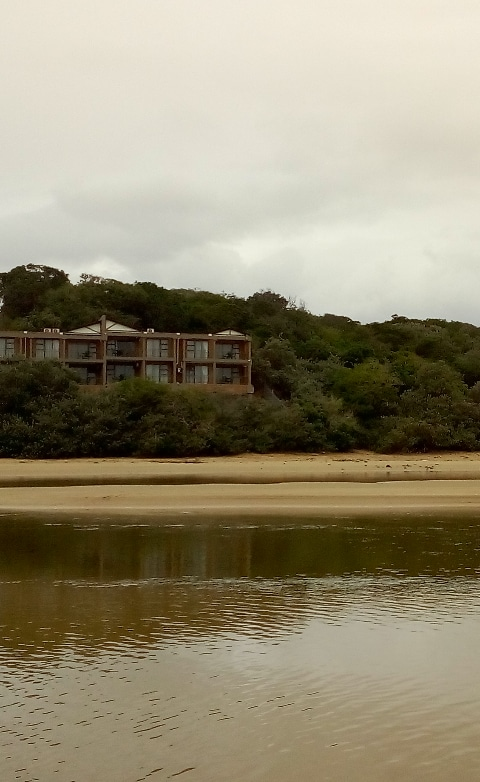

- Location of the Nahoon River mouth Nahoon River (South Africa) Nahoon River (Africa)
- Native name: Nxaruni (Xhosa)

Location
- Country: South Africa
- Province: Eastern Cape
- Municipality: Buffalo City
- Main Place: East London

Physical characteristics
- Source
  - location: Eastern Cape, South Africa
  - elevation: 1,500 m (4,900 ft)
- Mouth: Indian Ocean
  - location: East London, South Africa
  - coordinates: 32°59′S 27°57′E
  - elevation: 0 m (0 ft)

The Nahoon River (Xhosa: Nxaruni) is situated in the city of East London on the east coast of South Africa.

== Geography ==
It is to the east of the Buffalo River harbour, and is to the west of Gonubie River. The suburb of Nahoon is on its west bank and Beacon Bay is on the east bank. It flows through an estuary and Africa's southernmost mangrove forest into the Indian Ocean. Its mouth is located near Nahoon Reef which is a famous surfing spot and is also known for attacks by great white sharks.

== Water management ==
The Nahoon Dam supplies some of the water for the city of East London. Presently this river is part of the Mzimvubu to Keiskama Water Management Area.

== Ecology ==
There is a small population of the endangered Eastern Province rocky (Sandelia bainsii) in the Nahoon river.

== See also ==
- List of rivers of South Africa
- List of estuaries of South Africa
