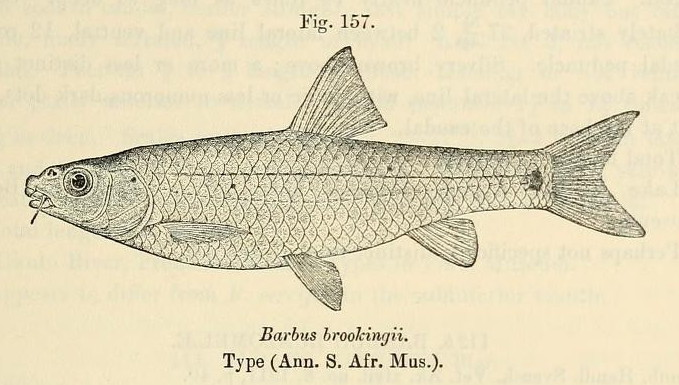

Conservation status
- Endangered (IUCN 3.1)

Scientific classification
- Kingdom: Animalia
- Phylum: Chordata
- Class: Actinopterygii
- Order: Cypriniformes
- Family: Cyprinidae
- Subfamily: Smiliogastrinae
- Genus: Amatolacypris; Skelton, Swartz & Vreven, 2018
- Species: A. trevelyani

Binomial name
- Amatolacypris trevelyani (Günther, 1877)

Synonyms
- Barbus brookingi Gilchrist & W. W. Thompson, 1913; Barbus trevelyani Günther, 1877; Pseudobarbus trevelyani (Günther, 1877)

= Border barb =

Species of fish

The border barb (Amatolacypris trevelyani) is a ray-finned fish species in the family Cyprinidae. It is the only species in the genus Amatolacypris. Like Pseudobarbus, it is tetraploid.

It is endemic to South Africa, where it has only been found in the Keiskamma and Buffalo Rivers of Eastern Cape Province, as well as their tributaries Mgqawabe and Yellowwoods Rivers.

Its natural habitat are pools and riffles over rocky ground, where the freshwater streams it inhabits are clean and run through forests. It feeds chiefly on nymphs of insects, and also on other small aquatic invertebrates, plant seeds and algae. The spawning season is spring to early summer (around October–November).

It is classified as Endangered by the IUCN mainly due to its restricted range. Even though it does not seem to decline markedly, its stocks are limited by African catfish (Clarias gariepinus), largemouth bass (Micropterus salmoides), smallmouth bass (Micropterus dolomieu), and trouts (Oncorhynchus and Salmo), which have been introduced in its home rivers. Also, water quality has deteriorated in modern times, and deforestation of riverbanks will drive the species from the area.
