= Tower Psychiatric Hospital =

Tower Psychiatric Hospital and Psychosocial Rehabilitation Centre
- Eastern Cape Department of Health

Geography
- Location: Fort Beaufort, Eastern Cape, South Africa
- Coordinates: 32°46′18″S 26°37′30″E

Organisation
- Care system: Specialiazed
- Type: Psychiatric

Services
- Emergency department: No

Links
- Website: Tower Hospital
- Other links: List of hospitals in South Africa

Tower Psychiatric Hospital is a government-funded psychiatric hospital and psychosocial rehabilitation Centre in the Raymond Mhlaba Local Municipality area of Fort Beaufort, Eastern Cape in South Africa. It provides long-term psychiatric care and psychosocial rehabilitation services to the entire Eastern Cape. The hospital has a full-time psychiatrist since December 2015.

The hospital departments include a rehabilitation center, pharmacy, anti-retroviral (ARV) treatment for HIV/AIDS, laundry services, and kitchen service.

In 1894 the colonial government converted the barracks at Fort Beaufort into an asylum for natives only. This asylum admitted both the mentally ill and patients with tuberculosis. Perhaps the most famous admission was made in 1922, when the prophetess Nontetha Nkwenkwe was incarcerated here.

Today the hospital is situated on grounds in Fort Beaufort within the Amathole Municipality. It provides medium-to-long-term psychiatric care (approximately 180 days) and psychosocial rehabilitation services. This is a government-funded hospital consisting of 400 beds (344 males, 56 females).

== Coat of arms ==
The hospital registered a coat of arms at the Bureau of Heraldry in 1970: Or, a tower of Fort Beaufort proper, ensigned with an antique lamp Azure enflamed Gules, over all a looped tau cross, Or, between two wings Azure. The arms were designed by Ivan Mitford-Barberton and Cornelis Pama.
