= Rooikrantz Dam =

- Interactive map of Rooikrantz Dam
- Official name: Rooikrantz Dam
- Country: South Africa
- Location: King William's Town, Eastern Cape
- Coordinates: 32°45′2″S 27°19′07″E
- Purpose: Irrigation and domestic use
- Owner: Department of Water Affairs

Dam and spillways
- Type of dam: Earth fill dam
- Impounds: Buffalo River

Reservoir
- Creates: Rooikrantz Dam Reservoir

Rooikrantz Dam is a dam on the Buffalo River, about 15 km northwest of King William's Town in the Eastern Cape, South Africa. It lies due east of the larger and newer Sandile Dam.

== See also ==
- List of reservoirs and dams in South Africa
- List of rivers of South Africa
