= Enoch Mgijima =

Christian Xhosa prophet

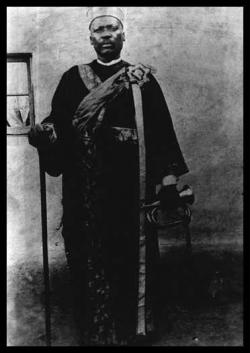
Enoch Mgijima

Enoch Mgijima (1868 – 5 March 1928) was a Xhosa prophet and evangelist. He formed his own church, known as the Israelites, a breakaway from the Church of God and Saints of Christ, and led them through a clash with the white Union of South Africa government, which left 163 Israelites dead, 129 wounded and 95 taken prisoner, in what became known as the Bulhoek Massacre.

== Personal life ==
Enoch Mgijima, the youngest of nine children – five girls and four boys, was born in Bulhoek, 25 km southwest of Queenstown to parents Jonas Mayekiso Mgijima and MaKheswa in 1868. His father, a successful farmer, Jonas Mgijima, was among those Mfengu people who accepted land from the British in a buffer zone - Ntabelanga, or Bulhoek - in return for their support. Like many Mfengu families in the area, the Mgijimas adopted British ideas like wearing Western clothing, raising their children as Wesleyan Methodists and sending them to mission schools. Mgijima's brothers studied at Lovedale Institute and Zonnebloem College in Cape Town. Mgijima completed Standard 3 (Grade 5) at a local school but could not go to Lovedale because of severe headaches. He became a member of the Wesleyan Methodist Church, Hunter and Farmer, It was during that time that he started having visions.

== Work ==
In April 1907, Mgijima had his first vision in which an angel said to him: "I have sent you to these people because I am worried that although they worship me, they are not honest in their worship of me. I want you to worship me according to your old traditions." After ignoring the vision, Mgijima began preaching again and acquired a large following as an evangelist. In 1910, after seeing Halley's Comet, Mgijima felt that his vision had been confirmed. To him, this was a sign that God was angry with humans and that they should return to their Old Testament beliefs. In 1912, Mgijima broke away from the Wesleyan Methodist Church and began baptising his followers whom he called the "Israelites" in the Black Kei River. This came after Mgijima had received a visit from John Isaac Msikinya, a man who had just come back from studying theology and anthropology at Howard University in Washington DC. Msikinya came with an instruction from Pastor William Saunders Crowdy in the United States. Crowdy was a run-away slave, a soldier and the founder of the original Church of God and Saints of Christ – the world's oldest black Hebrew denomination. The instruction was that Mgijima should leave the Wesleyan Methodist Church. In November 1912, he joined the Church of God and Saints of Christ, a small church based in the United States of America, observed the Sabbath on Saturday, held services four times a day, and had the Passover in mid-April as their main festival.

Towards the end of 1912, Mgijima predicted that the world would end by Christmas and would be followed by 30 days of rain. As a result of his prediction, the Israelites stopped working their fields. However, the end did not come. Over the years his visions became more intense. The Church of God and Saints of Christ asked Mgijima to renounce his visions. When he refused to do so, he was excommunicated. As a result, the church split into two factions – the Church of God and Saints of Christ and Mgijima's faction, the Israelites.

Mgijima, who had accumulated a large following, stood up at the tabernacle during a church service in 1919 and said "Juda, Efrayime, Josef, nezalwane (Judah, Ephraim, Joseph and brethren)". According to his followers, Israelites all over the country heard these words and believed that they were to come to Ntabelanga, their prophet's holy village, and await the Lord's coming. By 1921, 3000 Israelites had arrived in Ntabelanga.

== Bulhoek Massacre ==
In early 1920, local inspector of African locations, Geoffrey Nightingale visited Bulhoek and was reluctant to grant Mgijima permission to host the Passover Festival in the area that year. However, Mgijima assured him his followers would not stay for good. When the inspector visited the village in June, more Israelites had built houses, but Mgijima said many people had not been able to leave for various reasons. Nightingale reluctantly allowed them to stay for a short while. After continuous disagreements over land and the prolonged stay of Israelites in Bulhoek, the white South African government and Mgijima's followers clashed on 24 May 1921. This resulted in 163 Israelites declared dead, 129 wounded and 95 taken prisoner. The massacre is known as the Bulhoek massacre.

Mgijima, his elder brother Charles, and Gilbert Matshoba were sentenced to five years hard labour at DeBeer's Convict Station in Kimberley. He was released from prison in 1924 and returned to Bulhoek. Mgijima died on 5 March 1928 at the age of 60, leaving his wife, Tiyiwe Nondzaba, known by her married name "Mampumalanga the first", and a seven children: Sony, Innis, Zantsi, Mzanywa, Bumba, Topi and Mlauli.

== Legacy ==
Each year, on 24 May, the religious sect known as the Israelites, founded by Mgijima, host an annual pilgrimage to the grave where the 193 Israelites were buried on 25 May 1921, a day after the massacre. 24 May 2017 marked the 96th anniversary of the massacre.

On 3 August 2016, Tsolwana, Inkwanca and Lukhanji local municipalities were amalgamated to form Enoch Mgijima Local Municipality in honour of Enoch Mgijima.

== See also ==
- Bulhoek massacre
- List of massacres in South Africa
- Nontetha
- Ntsikana
- Makhanda
- Natives Land Act, 1913
