= Hewu Hospital =

- Eastern Cape Department of Health

Geography
- Location: Whittlesea, Enoch Mgijima Local Municipality, Eastern Cape, South Africa
- Coordinates: 32°10′11″S 26°47′30″E

Organisation
- Care system: Public
- Type: Community

Services
- Emergency department: Yes
- Beds: 208

Links
- Website: Eastern Cape Department of Health website - Chris Hani District Hospitals
- Other links: List of hospitals in South Africa

Hewu Hospital is a Provincial government funded hospital in Whittlesea, Eastern Cape in South Africa.

The hospital departments include Emergency department, Paediatric ward, Maternity ward, Out Patients Department, Surgical Services, Medical Services, Operating Theatre & CSSD Services, Pharmacy, Anti-Retroviral (ARV) treatment for HIV/AIDS, Post Trauma Counseling Services, Laboratory Services, X-ray Services, Laundry Services and Kitchen Services.
