= Tarkastad =

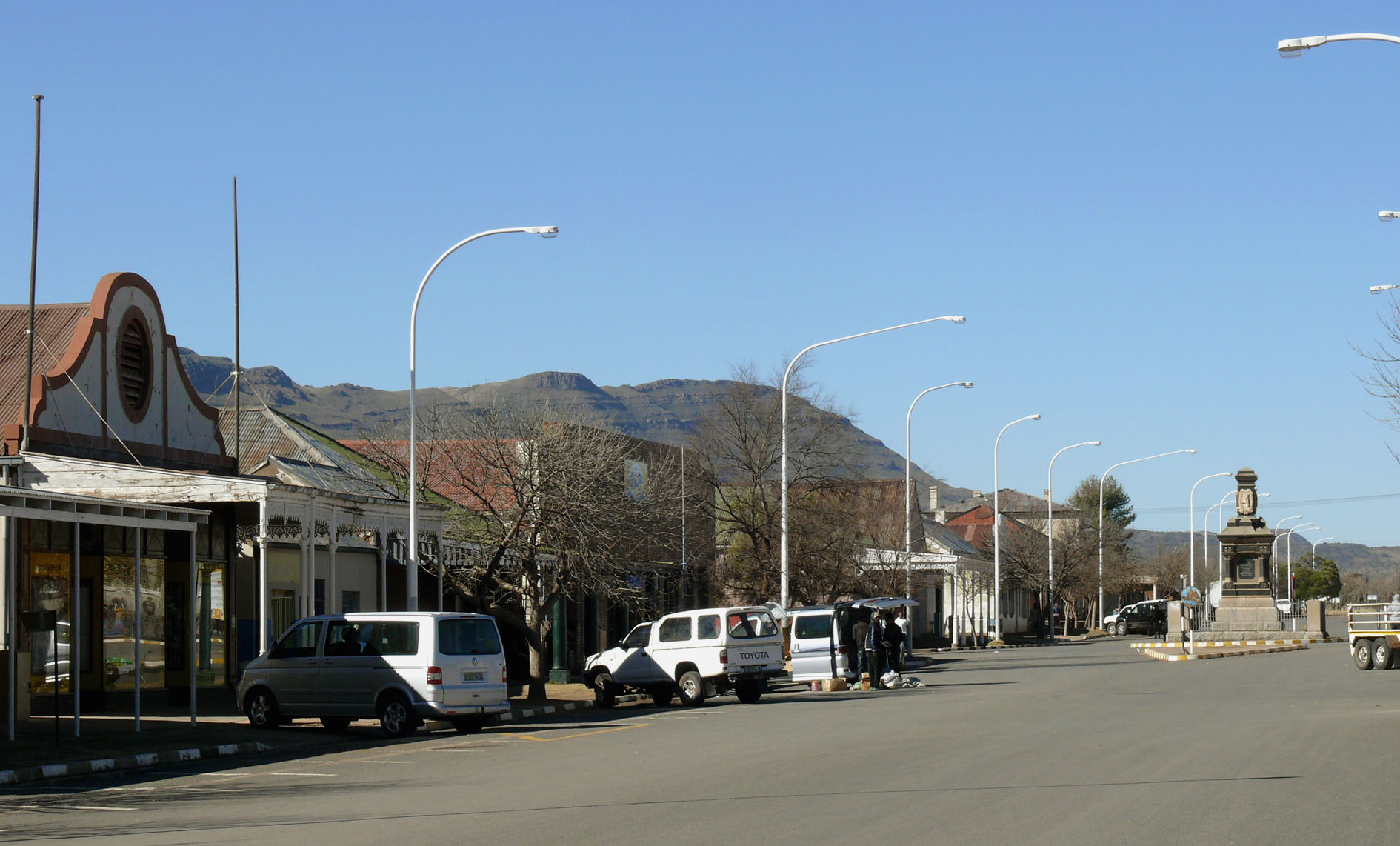
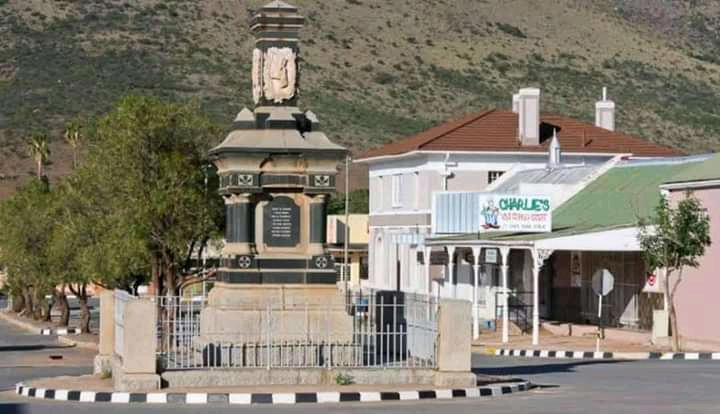
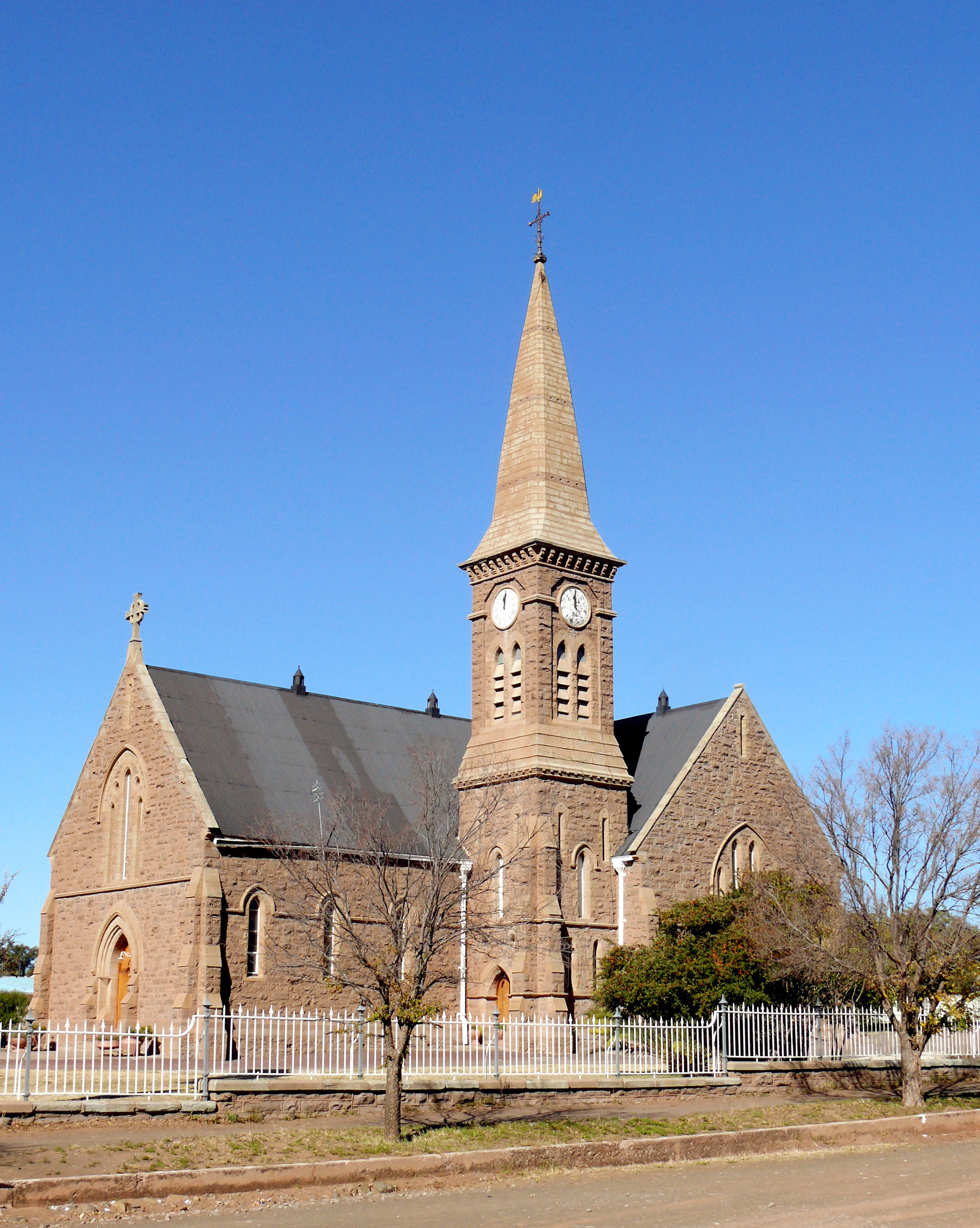
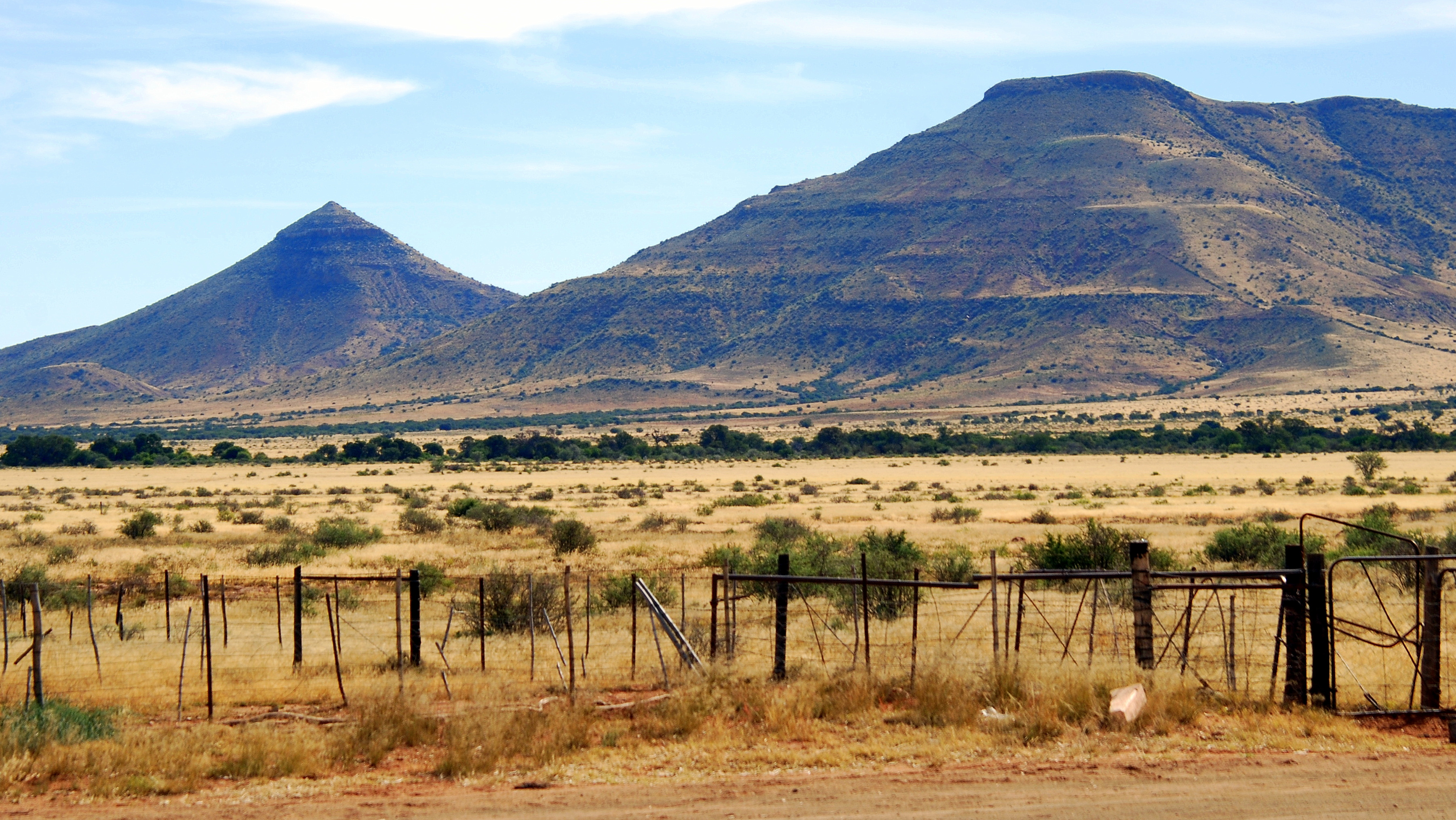
- Clockwise from top: The main street in Tarkastad in 2012, Dutch Reformed Church, Tarkastad, Nature around Tarkastad, World War I Memorial.

- Location within Eastern Cape Location within South Africa
- Coordinates: 32°00′27″S 26°15′36″E
- Country: South Africa
- Province: Eastern Cape
- District: Chris Hani
- Municipality: Enoch Mgijima

Population
  - Total: 1,604

Racial Makeup (2011)
  - Black African: 54.0%
  - Coloured: 29.9%
  - White: 14.5%
  - Indian/Asian: 0.5%

First Languages (2011)
  - Afrikaans: 44.9%
  - Xhosa: 41.6%
  - English: 10.0%
  - Others: 2.5%
- Time zone: UTC+2 (SAST)
- Postal code (street): 5370
- PO box: 5370

Tarkastad is a Karoo semi-urban settlement situated on the banks of Tarka River in the Eastern Cape province of South Africa. Tarkastad is on a plain to the north of the Winterberg mountain range on the R61 between Cradock and Komani and only three hours from Gqeberha. The name Tarkastad is believed to come from the Khoi-Khoi word Traka (meaning women) or the Celtic word Tarka (meaning otter) and the Afrikaans word Stad (meaning city). The fact that the town is overlooked by Martha and Mary; two peaks which look like two women resting after a hard day's work, also lends to the name.

== History ==
The first people to occupy the area around Tarkastad were the San who left an abundance of rock art paintings in Grootvlei just north of the town. The first farmers settled in Tarkastad in 1795 who built watermills, inns and both a Dutch Reformed and Presbyterian Church. Two Great Trek leaders, Andries Potgieter and Piet Retief, farmed here for a short while. After the Dutch farmers decided to accompany their leaders on the Great Trek, the English 1820 settlers moved in, and in 1862 Tarkastad was established as a church centre and became a municipality in 1864. Elands River Poort is a mountain pass located in the Karoo, 24 km to the NNW of Tarkastad, where the Battle of Elands River (1901) was fought during the Second Boer War. The grave of Lt. Richard Sheridan, a cousin of Winston Churchill, who was killed in the Battle of Elands River is located on the Modderfontein farm just outside Tarkastad. Victorian cast iron lamp posts, old water mills and broekie lace adornments indicate the British colonial influence.

Tarkastad's first Municipal Manager after apartheid was Smilo Dayi an ex-political prisoner. The first mayor after apartheid was Ntsikelelo Sampempe.

A family house in Tarkastad was the birthplace of anti-Apartheid activist and African nationalist, Steve Biko.

== Climate ==
Scientists have stated that Tarkastad has one of the healthiest climates in the world. Winters are cold with frequent snowfalls on high-lying mountain tops, while summers are hot and dry. Tarkastad which is situated at an elevation of 1,304 metres normally receives about 335 mm of rain per year, with most rainfall occurring mainly during summer.

== Economy ==
Surrounded by commercial farms, which specialize in crop, animal farming (Merino sheep, goats and cattle) and game farming, Tarkastad caters for the surrounding villages in Ntabethemba such as Tentergate, Khwezi and Khayalethu. Although no longer the capital of the Tsolwana Local Municipality which has been absorbed into the Enoch Mgijima Local Municipality, the town still offers public and administrative services for surrounding villages.

== Landmarks ==
- Tarkastad rock engravings in Grootvlei
- Tarkastad War Memorial
- Blanco Guest Farm-A game farming outside of Tarkastad
- Presbyterian Church (1881)
- Dutch Reformed Church (1880)
- Thrift Dam

== Demographics ==
The following statistics describing Tarkastad are from the 2011 census.

- Area: 81.79 square kilometres (31.58 sq mi)
- Population: 1604 : 19.61 inhabitants per square kilometre (50.8/sq mi)
- Households: 499: 6.10 per square kilometre (15.8/sq mi)

Gender	Population	%
Male	742	46.26%
Female	862	53.74%

Race	Population	%
Coloured	480	29.93%
Black African	866	53.99%
White	232	14.46%
Indian or Asian	8	0.50%
Other	19	1.18%

First language	Population	%
Afrikaans	667	44.89%
isiXhosa	618	41.59%
English	148	9.96%
Sesotho	4	0.27
Setswana	2	0.13
Sign language	2	0.13
isiZulu	3	0.20
isiNdebele	10	0.47
Sepedi	6	0.40%
Other	25	1.68%
Not applicable	118	

== Nearby villages and towns ==
- Tentergate
- Khwezi
- Khayalethu
- Tsolwana Nature Reserve
- Cradock
- Zola
- Thornhill
- Queenstown

== Notable people ==
- Steve Biko (1946–1977), South African anti-Apartheid activist

== See also ==
- Tsolwana Nature Reserve
- Queenstown
