= Bridle Drift Dam =

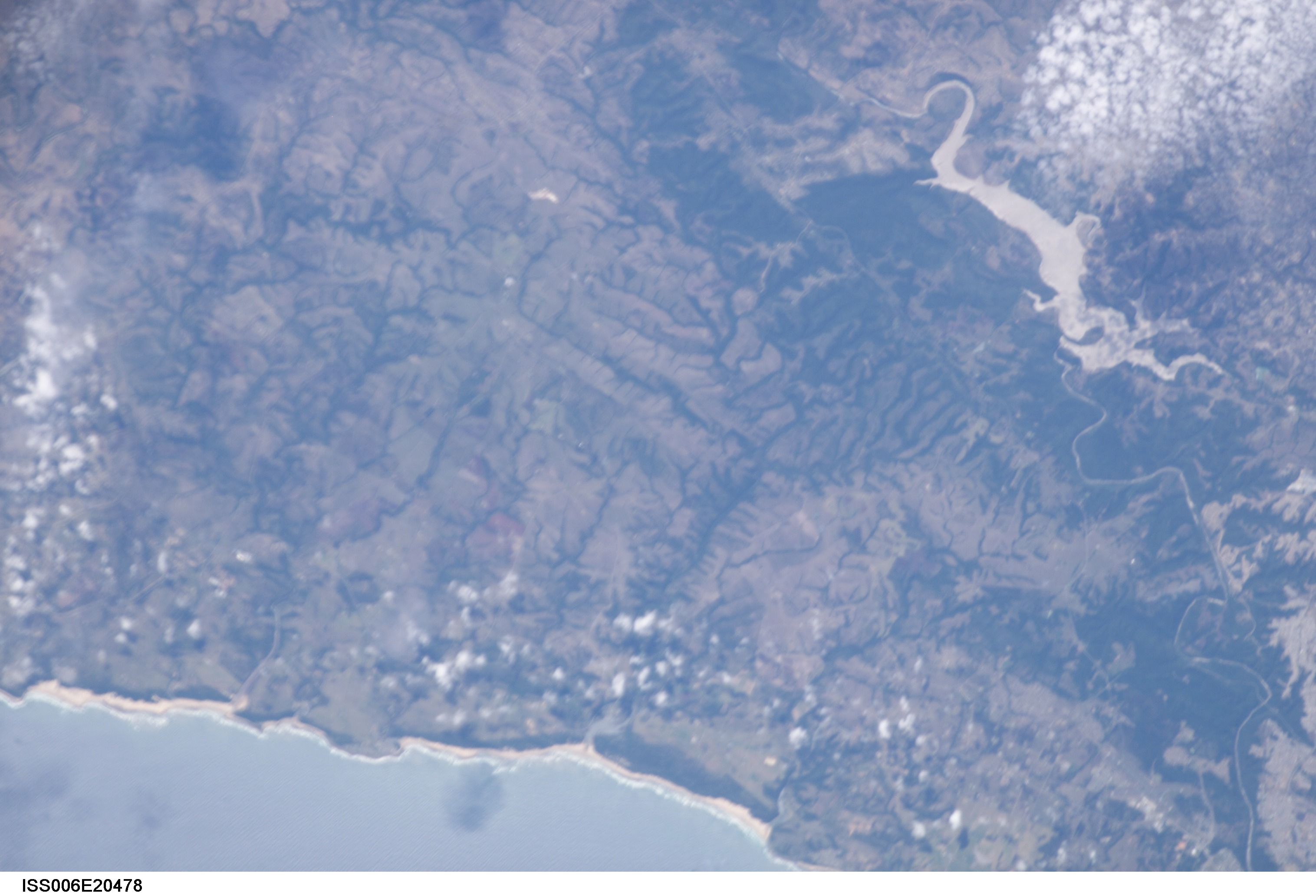
- View of Bridle Drift Dam and surrounding areas from ISS Expedition 6.
- Interactive map of Bridle Drift Dam
- Official name: Bridle Drift Dam
- Country: South Africa
- Location: East London, Eastern Cape
- Coordinates: 32°59′22″S 27°43′14″E
- Purpose: Industrial and domestic
- Opening date: 1969
- Owner: Department of Water Affairs

Dam and spillways
- Type of dam: rockfill
- Impounds: Buffalo River
- Height: 55 m
- Length: 623 m

Reservoir
- Creates: Bridle Drift Dam Reservoir
- Total capacity: 98 000 000 m^{3}
- Surface area: 735 ha

Bridle Drift Dam is a rock-fill type dam on the Buffalo River, near East London, Eastern Cape, South Africa. It was first constructed in 1969 and renovated in 1994. The purpose of the dam is for industrial and domestic use, the reservoir is now the main drinking water supply for Buffalo City.

== See also ==
- List of reservoirs and dams in South Africa
- List of rivers of South Africa
