= Kubusi River =

River in the Eastern Cape, South Africa

- Location within South Africa

Location
- Country: South Africa
- Region: Stutterheim, Eastern Cape

Physical characteristics
- Mouth
  - coordinates: 32.45°S 27.88333°E

The Kubusi River is a river near Stutterheim in the Eastern Cape Province of South Africa.

== Dams ==
- Wriggleswade Dam

== See also ==
- List of rivers in South Africa
