= Mthatha Dam =

- Interactive map of Mthatha Dam
- Official name: Mthatha Dam
- Country: South Africa
- Location: Mthatha, Eastern Cape
- Coordinates: 31°33′2″S 28°44′24″E
- Purpose: Industrial and domestic
- Opening date: 1977
- Owner: Department of Water Affairs

Dam and spillways
- Type of dam: Earth fill dam
- Impounds: Mthatha River
- Height: 38 metres (125 ft)
- Length: 620 metres (2,030 ft)

Reservoir
- Creates: Mthatha Dam Reservoir
- Total capacity: 253,674,000 cubic metres (8.9584×10^{9} cu ft)
- Catchment area: 886 km^{2}
- Surface area: 2,541.7 hectares (6,281 acres)

Mthatha Dam is an earth-fill type dam located on the Mthatha River, near Mthatha, Eastern Cape, South Africa. It was established in 1977 and serves mainly for municipal and industrial purposes. Its hazard potential has been ranked high (3).

== See also ==
- List of reservoirs and dams in South Africa
- List of rivers of South Africa
