= Nahoon Dam =

- Interactive map of Nahoon Dam
- Official name: Nahoon Dam
- Country: South Africa
- Location: Eastern Cape
- Coordinates: 32°54′39″S 27°48′40″E
- Purpose: Domestic and industrial use
- Opening date: 1966
- Owner: Department of Water Affairs

Dam and spillways
- Type of dam: Gravity dam
- Impounds: Nahoon River
- Height: 40 metres (130 ft)
- Length: 582 metres (1,909 ft)

Reservoir
- Creates: Nahoon Dam Reservoir
- Total capacity: 19,934,000 cubic metres (704,000,000 cu ft)
- Catchment area: 473 km^{2}
- Surface area: 237.7 hectares (587 acres)

Nahoon Dam is a gravity type dam located on the Nahoon River, near East London, Eastern Cape, South Africa. It was established in 1966 and serves primarily for domestic supply and industrial use. The hazard potential of the dam has been ranked high (3).

== See also ==
- List of reservoirs and dams in South Africa
- List of rivers of South Africa
