= Baccle's Farm =

- Location within Eastern Cape Location within South Africa
- Coordinates: 32.043°S 26.462°E
- Country: South Africa
- Province: Eastern Cape
- District: Chris Hani
- Municipality: Enoch Mgijima

Area
  - Total: 1.43 km^{2} (0.55 sq mi)

Population (2001)
  - Total: 1,145
  - Density: 801/km^{2} (2,070/sq mi)
- Time zone: UTC+2 (SAST)

Baccle's Farm is a town in Chris Hani District Municipality in the Eastern Cape province of South Africa.
