= Laing Dam =

- Interactive map of Laing Dam
- Official name: Laing Dam
- Location: Eastern Cape, South Africa
- Coordinates: 32°57′9″S 27°29′2″E
- Opening date: 1938 (renovated 1950)
- Operators: Department of Water Affairs and Forestry

Dam and spillways
- Type of dam: gravity
- Impounds: Buffalo River
- Height: 45 m
- Length: 283 m

Reservoir
- Creates: Laing Dam Reservoir
- Total capacity: 19 860 000 m³
- Catchment area: 913 km^{2}
- Surface area: 203.8 ha

Laing Dam is a gravity type dam located on the Buffalo River, near East London, Eastern Cape, South Africa. It was established in 1938 and has been renovated in 1950. The main purpose of the dam is to serve for irrigation and domestic use and its hazard potential has been ranked high (3).

== See also ==
- List of reservoirs and dams in South Africa
- List of rivers of South Africa
