= Tsolwana Nature Reserve =

South African protected area in Eastern Cape

- Location within Eastern Cape
- Location: Winterberg Mountains
- Nearest city: Tarkastad
- Coordinates: 32°10′14″S 26°30′01″E
- Area: 8,500 ha (21,000 acres)
- Governing body: Eastern Cape Parks

Tsolwana Nature Reserve is an 8,500 hectare nature reserve situated on the edge of the Winterberg Mountain range. It is located 60 km west of Queenstown, and 30 km south- east of Tarkastad in Eastern Cape Province, South Africa and is managed by Eastern Cape Parks Board. Its western boundary is formed by the upper Black Kei River. The reserve's name originates from the Xhosa word for "spike", due to the presence of the cone-shaped hill, Spitskop.

== History ==
Proclaimed in 1979, Tsolwana Nature Reserve was the final result of the state-subsidised stock reduction schemes that were introduced by the government in the severe drought of the late sixties to help protect the soil against erosion. The decreased stock numbers eventually led to an increase of indigenous animals. The area eventually became a conservation area and finally, in 2005, the Eastern Cape Parks Board became responsible for the management of Tsolwana.

== Climate ==
Tsolwana Nature Reserve marks the start of the Karoo. The climate can be extreme, with greatly varying temperatures and unpredictable heavy summer rainstorms and even hail. Rainfall peaks between January and March. In winter snow falls frequently while cold, wet southerly wind spells can cause wildlife losses, particularly in the plains antelope species. Tsolwana lies within a summer rainfall region, but rainfall is unpredictable and often falls in heavy storms, throughout the year, particularly in November. Seasonal temperatures differ greatly. Daytime temperatures reach 38 °C in summer while frost occurs in winter. Strong north-westerly winds can be expected from July to September, while frequent south-westerly winds bring rain in summer.

== Wildlife ==
Located in the Karoo, the reserve is home to many animal species including the white rhino, giraffe, eland, blesbok, mountain reedbuck, Cape mountain zebra, dassie, ant bear (aardvark), bat-eared fox, black backed jackal, baboon, gemsbuck, kudu, lynx, oryx, mongoose and springbok.

== Birdlife ==
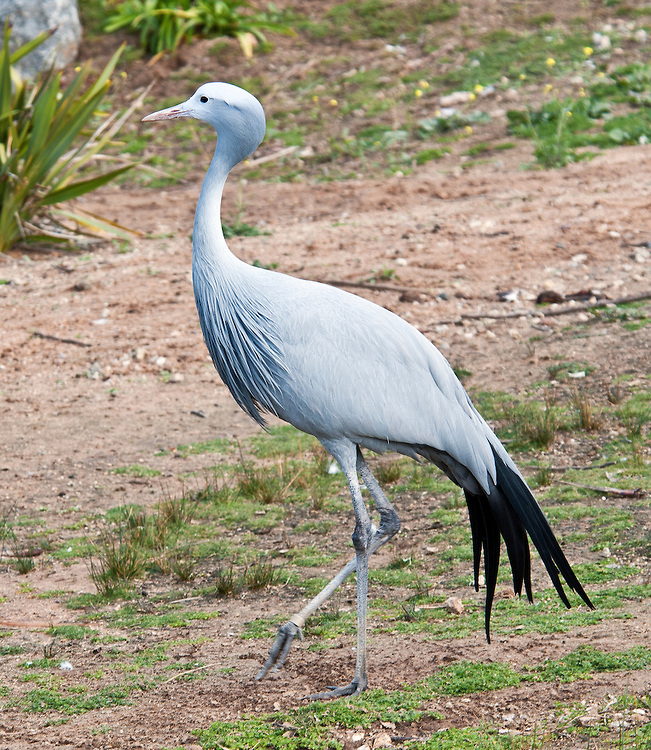

Tsolwana Game Reserve is home to South Africa's national bird, the Blue Crane, as well as the Cape Vulture and Ostrich.

== Environment ==
Susceptible to soil erosion and land degradation, its altitude sits at 1350m in the lowland regions and 1800m in the mountainous area. Located in the Karoo, the vegetation at the nature reserve is mostly made up of grassy plains and acacia thornveld.

== Economic impact ==
Tsolwana Nature Reserve is located near villages such as Tentergate, Thornhill, Waverley and Khwezi and provides employment for people living in these areas.

== See also ==
- South African National Parks – Body responsible for managing South Africa's national parks
- List of protected areas of South Africa
