= Tsomo River =

River in the Eastern Cape, South Africa

- Location within South Africa

Location
- Country: South Africa
- Province: Eastern Cape

Physical characteristics
- Mouth: Groot-Kei River
  - coordinates: 32°22′0″S 27°49′0″E
  - elevation: 955 m (3,133 ft)

The Tsomo River is a river in the Eastern Cape Province of South Africa. It is a tributary of the Great Kei River.

The river has been impacted by pollution from an unfinished waste water treatment project that has been left abandoned and vandalised.

Researchers have found instances of drug resistant bacteria in Tsomo river water.

== Dams on the Tsomo River ==
- Ncora Dam

== See also ==
- List of rivers of South Africa
