= Bongolo Dam (South Africa) =

- Interactive map of Bongolo Dam
- Official name: Bongolo or Bonkolo Dam
- Country: South Africa
- Location: Queenstown, Eastern Cape
- Coordinates: 31°52′4″S 26°55′15″E
- Purpose: Municipal and industrial use
- Construction began: 1905
- Opening date: 1908
- Owner: Lukhanji Local Municipality

Dam and spillways
- Type of dam: mass concrete
- Impounds: Komani River
- Height: 21 m (69 ft)
- Length: 115 m (377 ft)

Reservoir
- Creates: Bongolo Dam Reservoir
- Total capacity: 6,400,000 m^{3} (5,200 acre⋅ft)

Bongolo Dam, (also spelled Bonkolo) is located on the Komani River, near Queenstown, Eastern Cape, South Africa. The dam has a capacity of 7,015,000 cubic metres (247,700,000 cu ft). The Bongolo Dam, about 5 kilometres (3.1 mi) from town on the Dordrecht road, is one of Queenstown's main sources of water, its main purpose is for industrial and municipal usage. The wall was begun in 1905 and was for years the largest concrete dam wall in South Africa. Incidentally the origin of the name Bongola has caused some controversy, but it is believed by some to have been derived from the Xhosa language word mbongolo meaning donkey, as these animals were extensively used in the construction of the dam.

== See also ==
- List of reservoirs and dams in South Africa
- List of rivers of South Africa
