= Ncora Dam =

Dam in Eastern Cape, South Africa

- Interactive map of Ncora Dam
- Official name: Ncora Dam
- Country: South Africa
- Location: Eastern Cape
- Coordinates: 31°47′15″S 27°40′1″E
- Purpose: Irrigation
- Opening date: 1972
- Owner: Department of Water Affairs

Dam and spillways
- Type of dam: Gravity dam
- Impounds: Tsomo River
- Height: 40 metres (130 ft)
- Length: 305 metres (1,001 ft)

Reservoir
- Creates: Ncora Dam Reservoir
- Total capacity: 181,250,000 cubic metres (6.401×10^{9} cu ft)
- Catchment area: 1785 km^{2}
- Surface area: 1,507 hectares (3,720 acres)

Ncora Dam is a gravity type dam built by Concor and located on the Tsomo River, near Tsomo, Eastern Cape, South Africa. It was established in 1972 and serves mainly for irrigation purposes. The hazard potential of the dam has been ranked high (3).

== See also ==
- List of reservoirs and dams in South Africa
- List of rivers of South Africa
