= Van Riebeeck Tercentenary Festival =

Cultural festival in South Africa

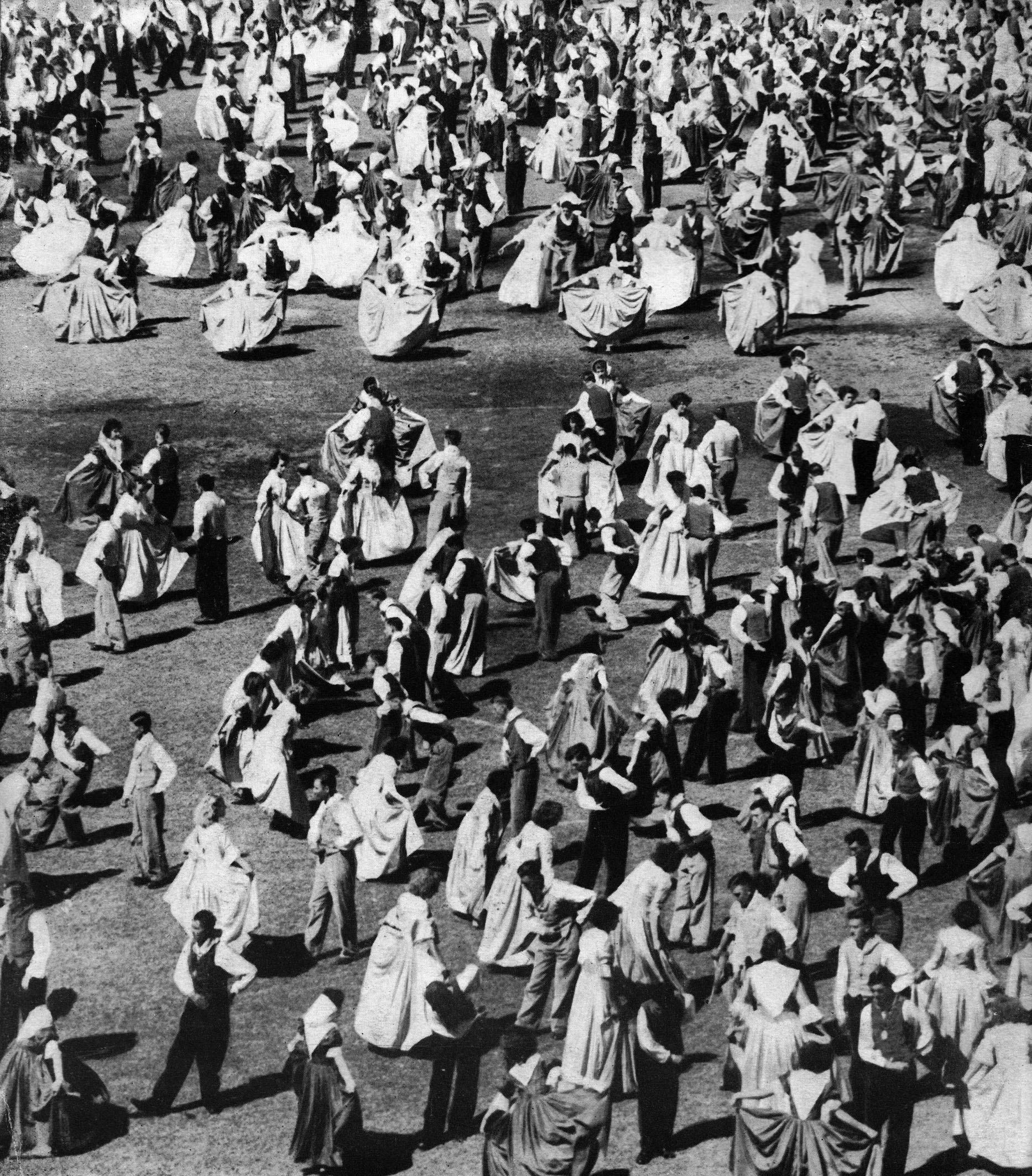

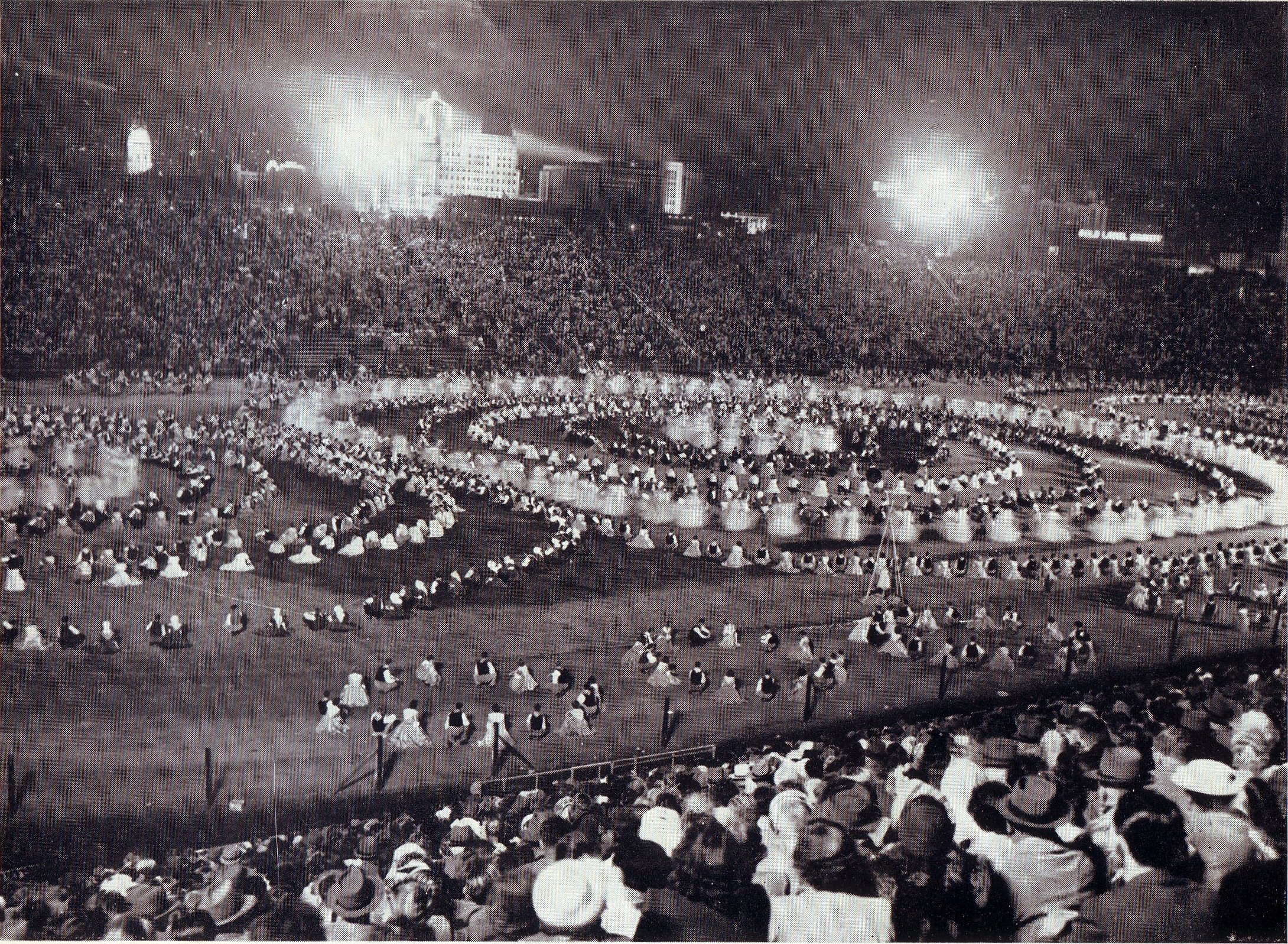

The Van Riebeeck Tercentenary Festival of 1952 was the three hundred year anniversary of the landing at the Cape of Jan van Riebeeck and with it the founding of what would later lead to the Cape Colony and then the Union of South Africa. The festival included exhibitions from several local fields of activity.

It was one of the three biggest festivals in South Africa in the twentieth century, together with the Simboliese Ossewatrek in 1938 and the inauguration of the Voortrekker Monument in 1949. The festival's slogan was: "We are building a nation" and the central thought for the celebrations: "South Africa after three hundred years."

== Background ==
The Van Riebeeck Tercentenary Festival took the same form as the previous folk festivals when it received generous state support. The central festival committee was chaired by dr. Abraham van der Merwe, co-teacher of the Groote Kerk in Cape Town for almost 40 years, elected moderator five times in a row by the Cape Synod and chairman of the first General Synod in 1962. Local festivals all over the country had to prepare the way for the central celebration in Cape Town. Before this, mail coaches, drawn by teams of horses, from the corners of the country undertook long journeys to Cape Town.

The idea was taken from the Simboliese Ossewatrek when the bullock carts moved to Pretoria for the laying of the cornerstone of the Voortrekker Monument 14 years before. The prime minister, dr. D.F. Malan, opened the proceedings with the departure of the first coach at Ohrigstad, the farthest point where the Voortrekkers originally settled. Along the way, the different communities each held their own festival, but unlike in 1938, it also involved English speakers and not just Afrikaans speakers. In several places, colored communities also took their place in the celebrations.

== Van Riebeeck Festival Art Exhibition ==
The festival also provided a cross section of South African artists active at the time (1952).

Full list of Painters that exhibited during the Van Riebeeck Festival
ALERS, Gerard ARLINGTON, May BAILEY, Beth BATTISS, Grace BATTISS, Walter BELL, Peter BERRY, Erica BOONZAIER, Gregoire BOSHOFF, Koos BRODIE, Benjamin BROOKE, Alice BUCHNER, Carl BUYS, Jan BYNG, Mary CAMPBELL-QUINE, Nina CHEALES, Richard CILLIERS-BARNARD, Bettie COETZEE, Herbert COETZEE, KG COETZER, WH D’ARCY-THOMPSON, Molly DAVIES, Eirys DAVIES, Mary DENNISTON, Patricia DESMOND, Nerine DE SWARDT, Flora DIXON, Leng DOMSAITIS, Pranas DUMBLETON, Bertram	DU TOIT, Paul ESMONDE-WHITE, Eleanor EVERARD, Bertha EVERARD-HADEN, Ruth FARLEY, John FERN, Emily FRANCK, Bruce FRANK, Audrey GAVRON, Gerald HARRIES, Katrine HART, Patrick HENKEL, Irmin HERTSLET, Rosalind HIGGS, Cecil HILLHOUSE, May HUTTON, Phay IRVING NICHOLSON, Edgar JENTSCH, Adolph KAY, Dorothy KING, Edith KLAR, Otto KRAMPE, Fritz KRENZ, Alfred KRIGE, Francois LAUBSCHER, Erik LAUBSER, Maggie LEONARD, Joyce LEVER, Joan	LEWIS, Neville LOCK, Freida LONG, Geoffrey LOY PLAUT, Faith LUCKHOFF, Carl MAYER, Erich MEERKOTTER, Dirk MEINTJES, Johannes MOMBERG, Bentley MOORE, Daphne MYLCHREEST, Ronald NEWMAN, Beryl OXLEY, John PAGDEN, Dulce PAPAS, William PICTON-SEYMOUR, Désirée PIERNEEF, JH PILKINGTON, George PINKER, Stanley PORTWAY, Douglas PRELLER, Alexis PROWSE, Ruth PURCHASE, Con ROBINSON, Pauline Parsons SASH, Cecily SCHONKEN, Grethe SCHRODER, Otto SEBOK, Elizabeth	SEKOTO, Gerard SHEPHARD, Rupert SKOTNES, Cecil SPEARS, Frank SPILHAUS, Nita STANDER, Jack STERN, Irma STONE, Cyril SUMNER, Maud TENNANT, Alice TODD, Cecil TYRRELL, Barbara VAN ESSCHE, Maurice VAN HEERDEN, Piet VAUGHAN-WILLIAMS, Mary VINING, Iris (AMPENBERGER) VOIGTS, Joachim VOLSCHENK, Vera WAGNER, Alex WALES-SMITH, Douglas WASSENAAR, Johanna WELMAN, DL WELZ, Jean WILSON, Beth WOOD, Egerton WYNAND STEYL, Jacobus

== Sources ==
- (in Afrikaans) Böeseken, dr. A.J., Krüger, prof. D.W. en Kieser, dr. A. 1953. Drie eeue. Die verhaal van ons vaderland. Kaapstad: Nasionale Boekhandel.
- (in Afrikaans) Sentrale Komitee van die Van Riebeeckfees (1952). 1952. Amptelike program van die Van Riebeeckfees (1952). Kaapstad: Sentrale Komitee van die Van Riebeeckfees (1952).
- (in English) Cape Times (red.). 1952. The Festival in Pictures / Die Fees in Beeld. Van Riebeeck Festival – Fees 1952. Cape Town: Cape Times Limited.
