= Tentergate =

- Location within Eastern Cape Location within South Africa
- Coordinates: 32.090°S 26.461°E
- Country: South Africa
- Province: Eastern Cape
- District: Chris Hani
- Municipality: Enoch Mgijima

Area
  - Total: 6.08 km^{2} (2.35 sq mi)

Population (2011)
  - Total: 5,187
  - Density: 853/km^{2} (2,210/sq mi)

Racial makeup (2011)
  - Black African: 99.3%
  - Coloured: 0.2%
  - Indian/Asian: 0.1%
  - Other: 0.4%

First languages (2011)
  - Xhosa: 94.5%
  - English: 1.2%
  - Other: 4.3%
- Time zone: UTC+2 (SAST)

Tentergate is a town in Chris Hani District Municipality in the Eastern Cape province of South Africa.

Tentergate was established in 1976, as a relocation camp for the people who fled Herschel ahead of its incorporation into an independent Transkei.
