= Thornhill, Enoch Mgijima =

Thornhill
- Location within Eastern Cape Location within South Africa
- Coordinates: 31.979°S 26.591°E
- Country: South Africa
- Province: Eastern Cape
- District: Chris Hani
- Municipality: Enoch Mgijima

Area
  - Total: 8.26 km^{2} (3.19 sq mi)

Population (2011)
  - Total: 5,288
  - Density: 640/km^{2} (1,660/sq mi)

Racial makeup (2011)
  - Black African: 99.5%
  - Indian/Asian: 0.1%
  - Other: 0.3%

First languages (2011)
  - Xhosa: 95.3%
  - Sotho: 1.7%
  - Other: 2.9%
- Time zone: UTC+2 (SAST)
- Postal code (street): 5365
- PO box: 6375
- Area code: 045

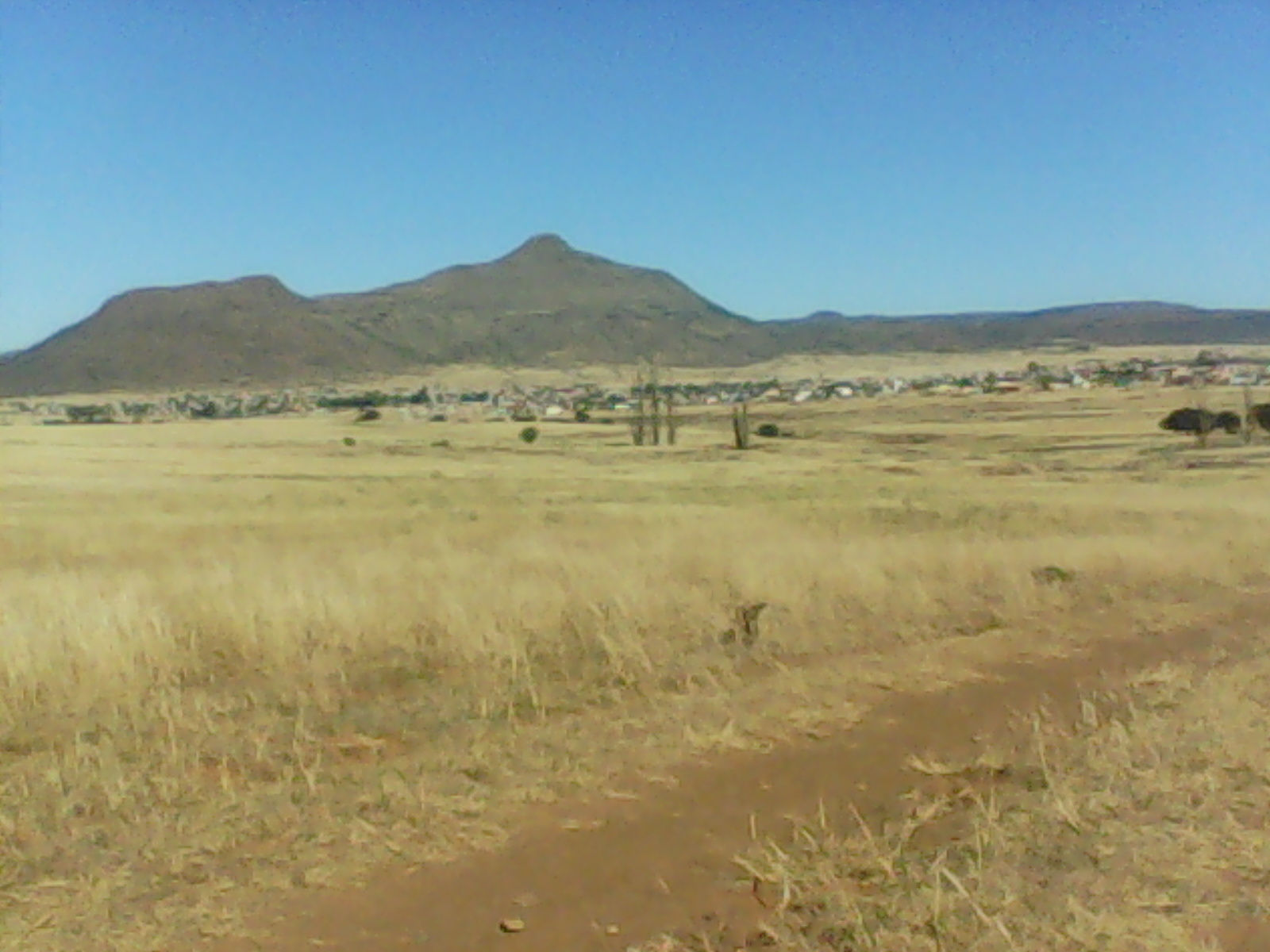
Thornhill Village

Thornhill is a rural village in Enoch Mgijima Local Municipality under the Chris Hani District Municipality in the Eastern Cape province of South Africa. Under the previous political dispensation (till 1994) it fell in the Ciskei homeland.

== History ==
From 1976, around 30,000-50,000 people moved from 23 villages in Sterkspruit and Herschel to an empty piece of land known as Thornhill. Three reasons have been given for the exodus. The first reason was that the then leader of Ciskei, Lennox Sebe, who was involved in a power struggle with Justice Mabandla lured the people of Herschel to consolidate his political power in Ciskei. By promising the local leader more privileges in Ciskei, he was able to draw people to the area.

A second reason that has been suggested is the application of the Citizenship Act of 1970 “which assigned all African South Africans citizenship in one of the bantustans, whether or not they had ever lived there or had any ties to them”. This act was aimed at resettling Black people outside what was called White South Africa.

The third reason was land scarcity, soil erosion and overpopulation in Herschel. Before the people of Herschel moved to Thornhill, they were promised land, houses, schools and clinics by Mr Uys, the South African Deputy Secretary of Bantu Administration and Education. However, when they arrived in Thornhill by the thousands, the only thing they found were tents that couldn't even accommodate all of them. The conditions were tough in the first few months. There was a lack of shelter for the refugees and livestock died because of the lack of feed. In January 1977 it was reported that 10 babies had died. Nevertheless, the people remained in Thornhill. The conditions at Thornhill were described in a 1983 article by The New York Times, with the paper reporting that 50% of children were said to have died before the age of 5.

== Land restitution ==
In 2013, the South African Deputy Minister of Rural Development and Land Reform, Pamela Tshwete, awarded more than R390 million to 3 043 households in compensation to the people of the Ntabethemba village. During Phase 1 of the process, R137 345 350.59 was released and each of the 1,071 households received an amount of R128 240.29, while the remaining 1,972 claims in the second phase were finalised and paid in 2014. The claimants, currently residing in Ntabethemba, live in the following villages: Merino Walk, Thornhill, Mitford, Bacle's Farm, Tentergate, Tembalethu, Rocklands, Zola, Phakamisa, Ikhwezi and Cangca village in Seymour.

== Education ==
The following schools serve the village and surrounding areas:

- Inyathi High School
- Thornvale Primary School
- Nonzwakazi Primary School
- Mthombo-wesizwe Primary School
- Hlalethembeni Primary School
- Avondale Senior Secondary School

== Economy ==
Located between Queenstown and Tarkastad, Thornhill relies on both towns for administrative and public services. Both towns provide a source of employment for the people of Thornhill, but due to the high population growth in Thornhill many people are without work, perpetuating a high rate of crime and a comparatively low standard of living. Although the government supplies the people of Thornhill with many services, change has been very slow.

== Demographics ==
The following statistics describing Thornhill are from the 2011 census.

- Area: 8.26 square kilometres (3.19 sq mi)
- Population: 5288 : 640.32 inhabitants per square kilometre (1,658.4/sq mi)
- Households: 1477: 178.85 per square kilometre (463.2/sq mi)

Gender	Population	%
Male	2383	45.06
Female	2905	54.94

Race	Population	%
Coloured	2	0.04
Black African	5260	99.47
White	2	0.04
Indian or Asian	6	0.11
Other	18	0.34

First language	Population	%
Afrikaans	14	0.26
isiXhosa	5043	95.37
English	45	0.85
Sesotho	90	1.70
Setswana	19	0.13
isiZulu	11	0.21
isiNdebele	7	0.13
Xitsonga	2	0.04
Sepedi	10	0.19
Other	24	0.45

== See also ==
- Enoch Mgijima Local Municipality
- Tsolwana Nature Reserve
