= Sandile Dam =

- Interactive map of Sandile Dam
- Official name: Sandile Dam
- Country: South Africa
- Location: Keiskammahoek, Eastern Cape
- Coordinates: 32°42′42″S 27°6′28″E
- Purpose: Irrigation
- Opening date: 1983
- Owner: Department of Water Affairs

Dam and spillways
- Type of dam: zoned embankment
- Impounds: Keiskamma River
- Height: 58 metres (190 ft)
- Length: 760 metres (2,490 ft)

Reservoir
- Creates: Sandile Dam Reservoir
- Total capacity: 30,960,000 cubic metres (1.093×10^{9} cu ft)
- Catchment area: 348 km^{2}
- Surface area: 146 hectares (360 acres)

Sandile Dam is a zoned embankment dam located on the Keiskamma River Ezingcuka near Keiskammahoek, Eastern Cape, South Africa. It was established in 1983 and serves mainly for irrigation purposes. The hazard potential of the dam has been ranked high (3).

The dam was named in honour of King Sandile kaNgqika, once the reigning king of the Rharhabe sub-group of the Xhosa nation.

== See also ==
- List of reservoirs and dams in South Africa
- List of rivers of South Africa
