= Wriggleswade Dam =

- Interactive map of Wriggleswade Dam
- Official name: Wriggleswade Dam
- Country: South Africa
- Location: Stutterheim, Eastern Cape
- Coordinates: 32°35′37″S 27°33′11″E
- Purpose: Industrial and domestic
- Opening date: 1991
- Owner: Department of Water Affairs

Dam and spillways
- Type of dam: Arch-gravity dam
- Impounds: Kubusi River
- Height: 30 metres (98 ft)
- Length: 780 metres (2,560 ft)

Reservoir
- Creates: Wriggleswade Dam Reservoir
- Total capacity: 93,200,000 cubic metres (3.29×10^{9} cu ft)
- Catchment area: 447 km^{2}
- Surface area: 1,000 hectares (2,500 acres)

Wriggleswade Dam is a combined gravity and arch type dam located on the Kubusi River near Stutterheim, Eastern Cape, South Africa. It was established in 1991 and primarily serves municipal and industrial water supply purposes. The hazard potential of the dam has been ranked high (3).

== See also ==
- List of reservoirs and dams in South Africa
- List of rivers of South Africa
