= Xonxa Dam =

- Interactive map of Xonxa Dam
- Official name: Xonxa Dam
- Location: Eastern Cape, South Africa
- Coordinates: 31°49′16.4″S 27°07′54.5″E
- Opening date: 1972
- Operator: Department of Water and Sanitation

Dam and spillways
- Type of dam: composite zoned earthfill/rockfill
- Impounds: White Kei
- Height: 48 m
- Length: 320 m

Reservoir
- Creates: Xonxa Dam Reservoir
- Total capacity: 158 500 000 m^{3}
- Catchment area: 1 486 km^{2}
- Surface area: 1 450 ha

Xonxa Dam, is a composite zoned earthfill/rockfill dam situated on the White Kei River in Eastern Cape, South Africa. It was established in 1972 and has a capacity of 158,500,000 cubic metres (5.60×10^{9} cu ft). The wall is 48 metres (157 ft) high. The dam serves mainly for irrigation purposes and its hazard potential has been ranked high (3).

== See also ==
- List of reservoirs and dams in South Africa
- List of rivers of South Africa
