= Waterdown Dam =

- Interactive map of Waterdown Dam
- Official name: Waterdown Dam
- Country: South Africa
- Location: Near Whittlesea, Eastern Cape
- Coordinates: 32°17′6″S 26°51′44″E
- Purpose: Household
- Opening date: 1958
- Owner: Department of Water Affairs

Dam and spillways
- Type of dam: Earth fill dam
- Impounds: Klipplaat River
- Height: 38 metres (125 ft)
- Length: 240 metres (790 ft)

Reservoir
- Creates: Waterdown Dam Reservoir
- Total capacity: 38,400,000 cubic metres (1.36×10^{9} cu ft)
- Catchment area: 602 km^{2}
- Surface area: 261 hectares (640 acres)

Waterdown Dam is an earth-fill type dam (reservoir) located on the Klipplaat River near Whittlesea, Eastern Cape, South Africa. It supplies Whittlesea and Queenstown with drinking water and was established in 1958. The hazard potential of the dam has been ranked high (3).

== See also ==
- List of reservoirs and dams in South Africa
- List of rivers of South Africa
