= Whittlesea, South Africa =

Whittlesea Hewu Vetlisi
- Location within Eastern Cape Location within South Africa
- Coordinates: 32°10′S 26°49′E
- Country: South Africa
- Province: Eastern Cape
- District: Chris Hani
- Municipality: Enoch Mgijima

Area
  - Total: 15.37 km^{2} (5.93 sq mi)

Population (2011)
  - Total: 14,756
  - Density: 960.1/km^{2} (2,487/sq mi)

Racial makeup (2011)
  - Black African: 99.1%
  - Coloured: 0.2%
  - Indian/Asian: 0.2%
  - White: 0.1%
  - Other: 0.4%

First languages (2011)
  - Xhosa: 93.3%
  - English: 2.5%
  - Other: 4.2%
- Time zone: UTC+2 (SAST)
- Postal code (street): 5360
- PO box: 5360

Whittlesea is a semi-rural town situated on the R67 road in the Hewu district, 37 km south of Komani, Eastern Cape Province, South Africa. The town is made up of the townships Ekuphumleni, Bhede, Ndlambe, Extension 4, Extension 5 and Sada. The town falls under the Enoch Mgijima Local Municipality which is under the Chris Hani District Municipality. Surrounding Whittlesea are 36 villages which make up the Hewu (meaning "flat land' in Xhosa) district.

== History ==
Founded in 1849, Whittlesea was a military outpost created to protect white settlers during the Frontier War of 1850–1853. The town was named after Whittlesea in Cambridgeshire, birthplace of Sir Harry Smith (1787-1860), Governor of the Cape Colony from 1847 to 1852. A British officer fortified five houses during the War of Mlanjeni (1850 to 1853), when the Xhosas besieged the settlement. One of these, which now forms part of the Post Office Complex, is still standing. Between 1948 and 1994, at the height of the apartheid regime in South Africa, Whittlesea belonged to the former Ciskei, a bantustan/homeland established in 1961 under the Promotion of Self-Government Act of 1959. Until 1994, there was no formal political organisation in Whittlesea. The Department of Internal Affairs facilitated decisions around land use, services and rates in the townships through township managers. After South Africa's first democratic election in 1994, Whittlesea became governed by a council.

== Landmarks ==
- Hewu Hospital (formerly operated by Lifecare, but provincialized since 2010) is to be found only 4 km on the road to Ekuphumleni Township.
- Whittlesea Library. Located at the municipality offices, the library caters for the town and the surrounding villages.
- Walter Sisulu University Whittlesea campus
- Whittlesea Police Station
- Department of Home Affairs
- Harrison Hope. Opened in 2009, the wine estate located on Harrison Farm outside of Whittlesea is the first wine estate in the Eastern Cape.
- Inkosi Wine is housed at the Shiloh Irrigation Scheme and was launched on 19 April 2017.

== Economy ==
Whittlesea functions as a central town, providing services and shopping facilities to the surrounding villages. The inhabitants of the town rely on the neighbouring town of Queenstown for their economic needs. Due to the failure of the factories built by the Taiwanese in Sada in the 1990s, the underutilisation of small business complexes, a lack of funding and a lack of natural resources, Whittlesea has become a source of migrant labour. However, projects started by The South African National Roads Agency Ltd (SANRAL) and Expanded Public Works Programmes have brought hope to the area.

== Demographics ==
The following statistics describing Whittlesea are from the 2011 census.

- Area: 15.37 square kilometres (5.93 sq mi)
- Population: 14756 : 1,960.04 inhabitants per square kilometre (5,076.5/sq mi)
- Households: 9,473: 263.56 per square kilometre (682.6/sq mi)

Gender	Population	%
Male	6,774	45.91
Female	7,982	54.09

Race	Population	%
Coloured	27	0.18
Black African	14,621	99.09
White	16	0.11
Indian or Asian	35	0.24
Other	57	0.39

First language	Population	%
Afrikaans	64	0.44
isiXhosa	13666	93.27
English	369	2.52
Sesotho	80	0.55
Setswana	19	0.13
Sign language	118	0.81
isiZulu	53	0.36
isiNdebele	49	0.33
Xitsonga	17	0.12
Sepedi	31	0.21
Tshivenda	19	0.13
siSwati	6	0.04
Other	162	1.11
Not applicable	104	

== Villages ==
Some of the villages surrounding Whittlesea include;

- Oxton village
- Haytor Clinic(Sibonile)
- Diphala
- Peter
- Nyana
- Lower Didimana
- Upper Didimana
- Kamastone
- Bulhoek (Ntabelanga, Qhwabhi, Stratweni)
- Romanslaagte
- Tsitsikama
- KuzaNgqokwe
- Phelandaba
- McBright
- Mcewula
- KwaSemi
- Ensaam
- Thornhill
- EZola
- Lower Hukuwa
- Upper Hukuwa
- Ekuphumleni (Dongwe)
- Sada
- Tambo
- Cimezile
- Ngcamnga
- Mtha
- KuNdlambe
- Bede
- Nkwankwankwa
- Muswa
- Mthwakazi
- Hekeni (Hackney)
- Zweledinga
- Yonda
- Dyamala
- eMabheleni
- Mbekweni
- Gallawater
- Long dry
- Ngojini
- Qawukeni
- Upper Lahlangubo
- eChibini
- Sihlabeni
- Zangqokhwe
- Lower Lahlangubo
