= White Kei River =

River in the Eastern Cape, South Africa

White Kei River Wit-Keirivier
- Location of the White Kei River mouth
- Etymology: From kei, the word for "water" in the Khoekhoe language

Location
- Country: South Africa
- Province: Eastern Cape Province

Physical characteristics
- Source: Stormberg
  - location: Eastern Cape, South Africa
  - elevation: 1,500 m (4,900 ft)
- Source confluence: Swart-Kei / Wit-Kei
- Mouth: Confluence with Black Kei River
  - coordinates: 32°13′34″S 27°30′36″E
  - elevation: 540 m (1,770 ft)

The White Kei River or Wit-Kei River is a river in the Eastern Cape, South Africa. It originates north of Queenstown, beginning its course as the Grootvleispruit river and eventually joining the Black Kei River, to form the Great Kei River.

The Xonxa Dam is located in the White Kei River. Presently this river is part of the Mzimvubu to Keiskama Water Management Area.

== See also ==
- Great Kei River
- List of rivers of South Africa
