= Kat River =

River in the Eastern Cape, South Africa

Kat River Katrivier
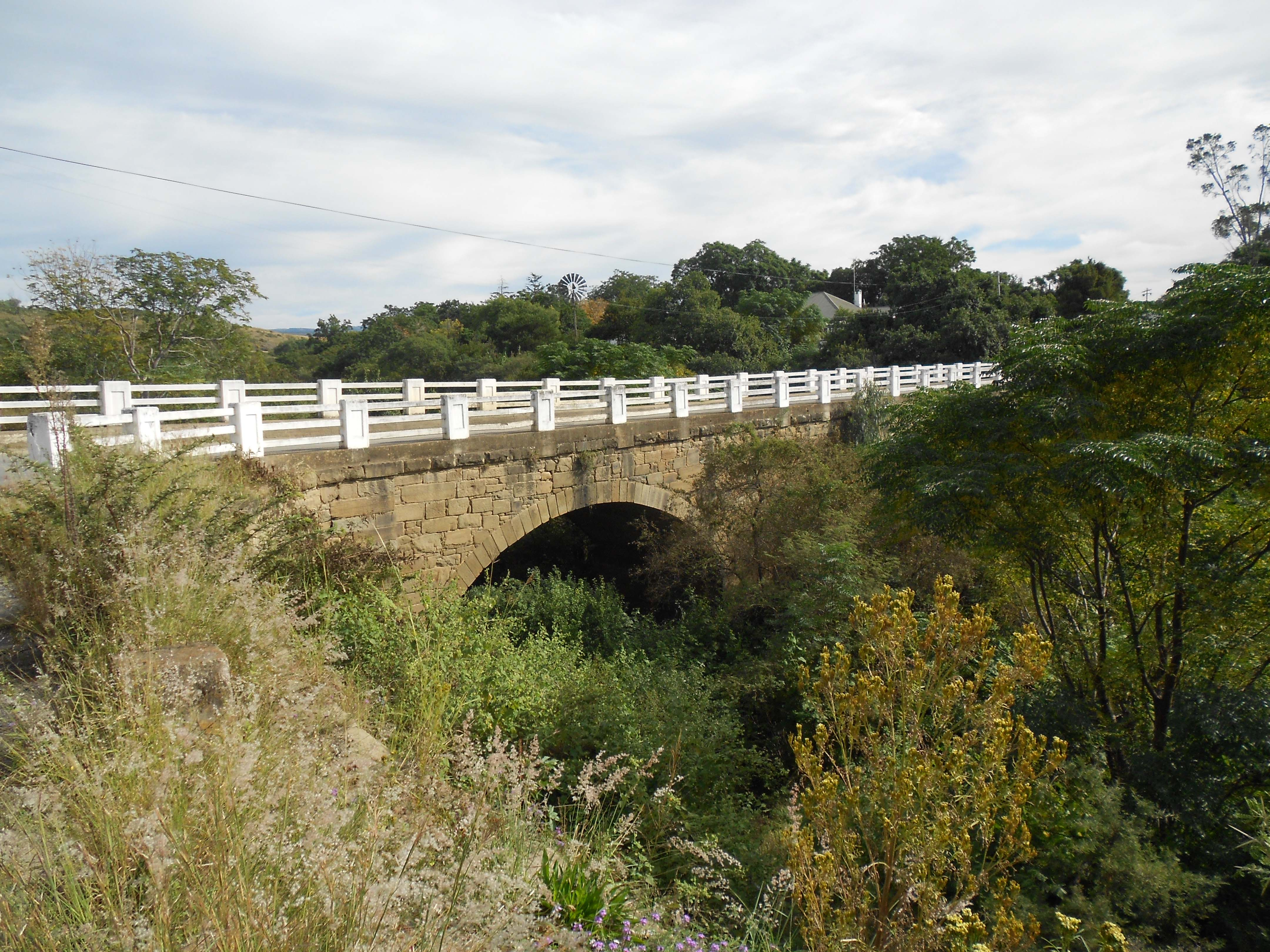

- Location of the Kat River in the Eastern Cape

Location
- Country: South Africa
- Region: Eastern Cape

Physical characteristics
- Source
  - location: Winterberg, Eastern Cape
  - coordinates: 32°34′17″S 26°45′34″E
- Mouth
  - location: Great Fish River, Eastern Cape
  - coordinates: 32°59′44″S 26°47′5″E
- Length: 150 km (93 mi)

The Kat River (Afrikaans: Katrivier) is a tributary of the Great Fish River, that drains the southern slopes of the Winterberg in the Eastern Cape Province, South Africa.

== Etymology ==
Kat, meaning "cat", is a translation of the Khoekhoen word "huncu", that apparently referred to the wildcats of the area. It lent its name to Katberg, the Katberg Pass and the Kat River Settlement.

== Course and utilization ==
The 150 kilometres (93 mi) long Kat River rises 30 km north of Fort Beaufort in the Katberg escarpment of the Winterberg. At 32°59′44″S 26°47′5″E it forms a northern tributary of the Great Fish River, northeast of Fort Brown and south of Hamburg, Eastern Cape.

It supplies the Kat River Valley with irrigation water for large citrus orchards, and supplies Seymour and Fort Beaufort with domestic water.

Dams

- Katrivier Dam

== See also ==
- List of rivers in South Africa
