= Tyhume River =

River in the Eastern Cape, South Africa

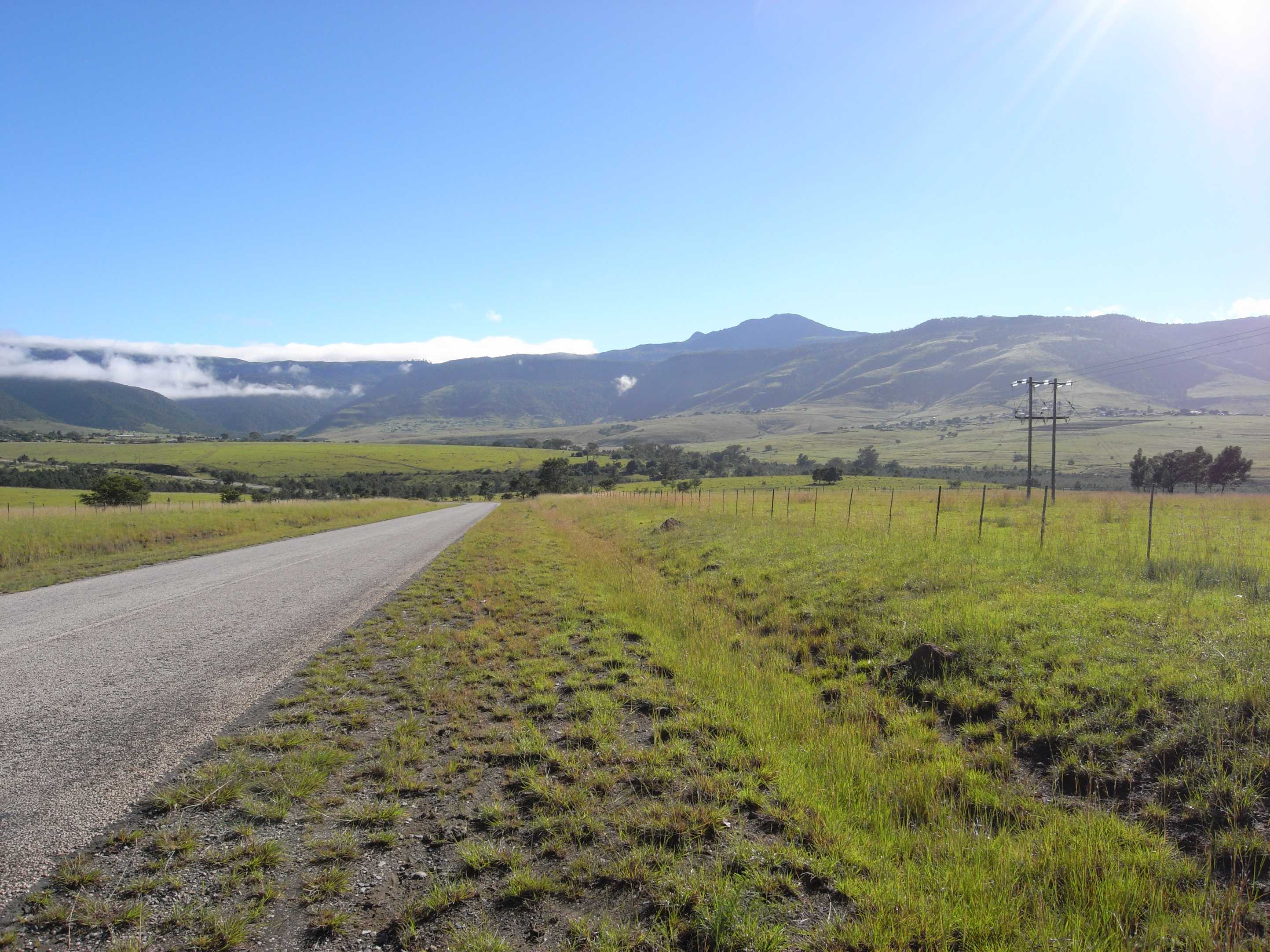
- Tyhume River Valley below Hogsback Pass

- Location of the Tyhume River mouth

Location
- Country: South Africa
- Region: Eastern Cape

Physical characteristics
- Source
  - location: Amathole Mountains, Hogsback, Eastern Cape
- Mouth: Keiskamma River
  - coordinates: 32°41′5″S 26°54′18″E
- Discharge
  - location: Keiskamma River

The Tyhume River is a river in Amathole District Municipality in the central part of the Eastern Cape province of South Africa. It springs in the forested mountains of Hogsback, part of the Amatola Mountains, and runs down the Tyhume River Valley and through the eastern verge of the small town of Alice, Eastern Cape, bordering most of the Fort Hare University grounds.

Almost in the centre of the valley, it is being dammed by the Binfield Park Dam at 32°41′13″S 26°54′16″E, a major water storage reservoir for the rural settlements and farms in the area, as well as Middledrift town lower down, all in the Nkonkobe Local Municipality area. After the dam, the river flows down south, then east and south-east to later join the Keiskamma River on its way to the Indian Ocean near Hamburg.

== See also ==
- List of rivers of South Africa
- List of dams in South Africa
- List of drainage basins of South Africa
- Water Management Areas
