= Raymond Mhlaba Local Municipality elections =

Local elections in the Eastern Cape, South Africa

The Raymond Mhlaba Local Municipality council was established in 2016 by the merging of the Nkonkobe and Nxuba local municipalities and consists of forty-two members elected by mixed-member proportional representation. Twenty-one councillors are elected by first-past-the-post voting in twenty-one wards, while the remaining twenty-one are chosen from party lists so that the total number of party representatives is proportional to the number of votes received.

In the election of 4 November 2026 the African National Congress (ANC) won a majority of twenty-six seats.

== Results ==
The following table shows the composition of the council after past elections.

Event	ANC	DA	EFF	PAC	PA	Other	Total
2016 election	38	5	3	0	—	0	46
2021 election	33	3	3	1	1	4	45
2026 election	26	3	2	1	1	9	42

== August 2016 election ==
The following table shows the results of the 2016 election.

Party	Ward			List			Total seats
Party	Votes	%	Seats	Votes	%	Seats	Total seats
African National Congress	34,232	76.77	23	35,725	80.84	15	38
Democratic Alliance	4,338	9.73	0	4,517	10.22	5	5
Economic Freedom Fighters	2,097	4.70	0	2,711	6.13	3	3
Independent candidates	3,129	7.02	0				0
Pan Africanist Congress of Azania	457	1.02	0	298	0.67	0	0
United Democratic Movement	225	0.50	0	454	1.03	0	0
African People's Convention	48	0.11	0	322	0.73	0	0
African Christian Democratic Party	67	0.15	0	164	0.37	0	0
Total	44,593	100.00	23	44,191	100.00	23	46
Valid votes	44,593	97.90		44,191	97.11		
Invalid/blank votes	957	2.10		1,314	2.89		
Total votes	45,550	100.00		45,505	100.00		
Registered voters/turnout	82,963	54.90		82,963	54.85		

== November 2021 election ==
The following table shows the results of the 2021 election.

Party	Ward			List			Total seats
Party	Votes	%	Seats	Votes	%	Seats	Total seats
African National Congress	26,026	70.11	20	26,940	75.44	13	33
Economic Freedom Fighters	2,277	6.13	0	2,806	7.86	3	3
Democratic Alliance	2,475	6.67	0	2,553	7.15	3	3
Independent candidates	5,008	13.49	3				3
Patriotic Alliance	587	1.58	0	650	1.82	1	1
African Independent Congress				998	2.79	1	1
Pan Africanist Congress of Azania	250	0.67	0	746	2.09	1	1
African Transformation Movement	150	0.40	0	632	1.77	0	0
Freedom Front Plus	144	0.39	0	159	0.45	0	0
Congress of the People	47	0.13	0	226	0.63	0	0
Land Party	156	0.42	0				0
Total	37,120	100.00	23	35,710	100.00	22	45
Valid votes	37,120	97.83		35,710	94.28		
Invalid/blank votes	825	2.17		2,167	5.72		
Total votes	37,945	100.00		37,877	100.00		
Registered voters/turnout	78,861	48.12		78,861	48.03		

=== By-elections from November 2021 ===
The following by-elections were held to fill vacant ward seats in the period since November 2021.

Date	Ward	Party of the previous councillor	Party of the newly elected councillor
20 Nov 2024	23	African National Congress	African National Congress
22 Jan 2025	4	African National Congress	African National Congress

== November 2026 election ==
The following table shows the results of the 2026 election.

Party	Ward			List			Total seats
Party	Votes	%	Seats	Votes	%	Seats	Total seats
African National Congress	23,298	55.30	20	25,466	61.44	6	26
South African Communist Party	4,038	9.58	0	3,982	9.61	4	4
Democratic Alliance	2,756	6.54	0	3,046	7.35	3	3
Independent candidates	5,671	13.46	1				1
Economic Freedom Fighters	1,934	4.59	0	2,717	6.56	2	2
Phakama Adelaide Movement	1,441	3.42	0	1,433	3.46	2	2
African Transformation Movement	890	2.11	0	1,311	3.16	1	1
Patriotic Alliance	914	2.17	0	914	2.21	1	1
Pan Africanist Congress of Azania	466	1.11	0	1,255	3.03	1	1
uMkhonto weSizwe Party	287	0.68	0	568	1.37	1	1
Freedom Front Plus	187	0.44	0	265	0.64	0	0
Afrika Mayibuye Movement	146	0.35	0	211	0.51	0	0
Al Jama-ah	79	0.19	0	118	0.28	0	0
Inkatha Freedom Party	27	0.06	0	161	0.39	0	0
Total	42,134	100.00	21	41,447	100.00	21	42
Valid votes	42,134	98.04		41,447	97.39		
Invalid/blank votes	842	1.96		1,110	2.61		
Total votes	42,976	100.00		42,557	100.00		
Registered voters/turnout	90,060	47.72		90,060	47.25		
