= Nkonkobe Local Municipality =

Coordinates: 32°47′S 26°38′E

Nkonkobe
- Former local municipality
- Seal

- Location in the Eastern Cape
- Country: South Africa
- Province: Eastern Cape
- District: Amathole
- Seat: Fort Beaufort
- Wards: 21

Government
  - Type: Municipal council
  - Mayor: Anele Ntsangani

Area
  - Total: 3,626 km^{2} (1,400 sq mi)

Population (2011)
  - Total: 127,115
  - Density: 35.06/km^{2} (90.80/sq mi)

Racial makeup (2011)
  - Black African: 94.5%
  - Coloured: 4.0%
  - Indian/Asian: 0.2%
  - White: 1.0%

First languages (2011)
  - Xhosa: 90.1%
  - Afrikaans: 5.0%
  - English: 2.7%
  - Other: 2.2%
- Time zone: UTC+2 (SAST)
- Municipal code: EC127

Nkonkobe Local Municipality was an administrative area in the Amatole District of the Eastern Cape in South Africa. The municipality is named after the Winterberg mountain range, Nkonkobe in isiXhosa. The seat, as well as most offices, of the Municipality are in Fort Beaufort, but the Council's chambers in Alice are generally used for council meetings, being better equipped. Other towns served by the municipality are Seymour, Balfour, Hogsback and Middledrift. After municipal elections on 3 August 2016 it was merged into the larger Raymond Mhlaba Local Municipality.

== Main places ==
The 2001 census divided the municipality into the following main places:

Place	Code	Area (km^{2})	Population
Alice	21601	21.97	8,009
Amagqunukwebe	21602	576.57	35,694
Amagwala	21603	57.03	854
Amajingqi	21604	161.57	11,441
Amakhuze	21605	30.49	2,525
Balfour	21606	4.82	2,428
Bellvale	21607	2.00	468
Bhofolo	21608	2.54	12,098
Blinkwater	21609	5.17	1,041
Ekuphumuleni	21610	1.79	436
Fort Beaufort	21611	46.19	10,093
Gaga	21612	75.06	7,956
Gaika-Mbo	21613	69.15	2,796
Hogsback	21614	6.78	648
Imingcangathelo	21615	24.56	4,849
Jingqi	21616	0.44	190
Mhlangeni	21617	1.49	116
Middledrift	21618	2.12	665
Mlungisi	21619	1.23	307
Moreson	21620	1.48	84
Mpofu	21621	704.06	3,665
Ngqika	21622	18.99	1,580
Ngwalana	21623	32.97	1,922
Seymour	21625	2.21	1,552
Tamboekie Vlei	21626	1.18	344
Tyhume	21627	116.92	8,238
Victoria East	21628	318.90	5,941
Remainder of the municipality	21624	1,437.77	2,727

== Politics ==
The municipal council consisted of forty-one members elected by mixed-member proportional representation. Twenty-one councillors were elected by first-past-the-post voting in twenty-one wards, while the remaining twenty were chosen from party lists so that the total number of party representatives was proportional to the number of votes received. In the election of 18 May 2011 the African National Congress (ANC) won a majority of thirty-five seats on the council. The following table shows the results of the election.

Party	Votes				Seats		
Party	Ward	List	Total	%	Ward	List	Total
ANC	29,342	31,923	61,265	82.8	20	15	35
COPE	2,072	2,248	4,320	5.8	0	2	2
DA	1,800	1,834	3,634	4.9	0	2	2
Independent	3,339	–	3,339	4.5	1	–	1
PAC	757	488	1,245	1.7	0	1	1
UDM	19	205	224	0.3	0	0	0
Total	37,329	36,698	74,027	100.0	21	20	41
Spoilt votes	1,184	1,702	2,886				
