= Disa scullyi =

Scientific classification
- Kingdom: Plantae
- Clade: Tracheophytes
- Clade: Angiosperms
- Clade: Monocots
- Order: Asparagales
- Family: Orchidaceae
- Subfamily: Orchidoideae
- Genus: Disa
- Species: D. scullyi

Binomial name
- Disa scullyi Bolus

Species of flowering plant

Disa scullyi is a perennial plant and geophyte belonging to the genus Disa. The plant is endemic to KwaZulu-Natal and the Eastern Cape where it occurs from the KwaZulu-Natal Midlands around Estcourt, southwards through KwaZulu-Natal and the foothills of the Eastern Cape Drakensberg to the Amathole Mountains near Hogsback. The species' numbers have declined by between 60 and 70% in the past 30 years due to the drainage of swampy areas where the plant grows. In some places, overgrazing and trampling by livestock are also a cause of the species' decline. In other places, invasive plants are also a problem. It is estimated that the total population is only 1500 plants.
