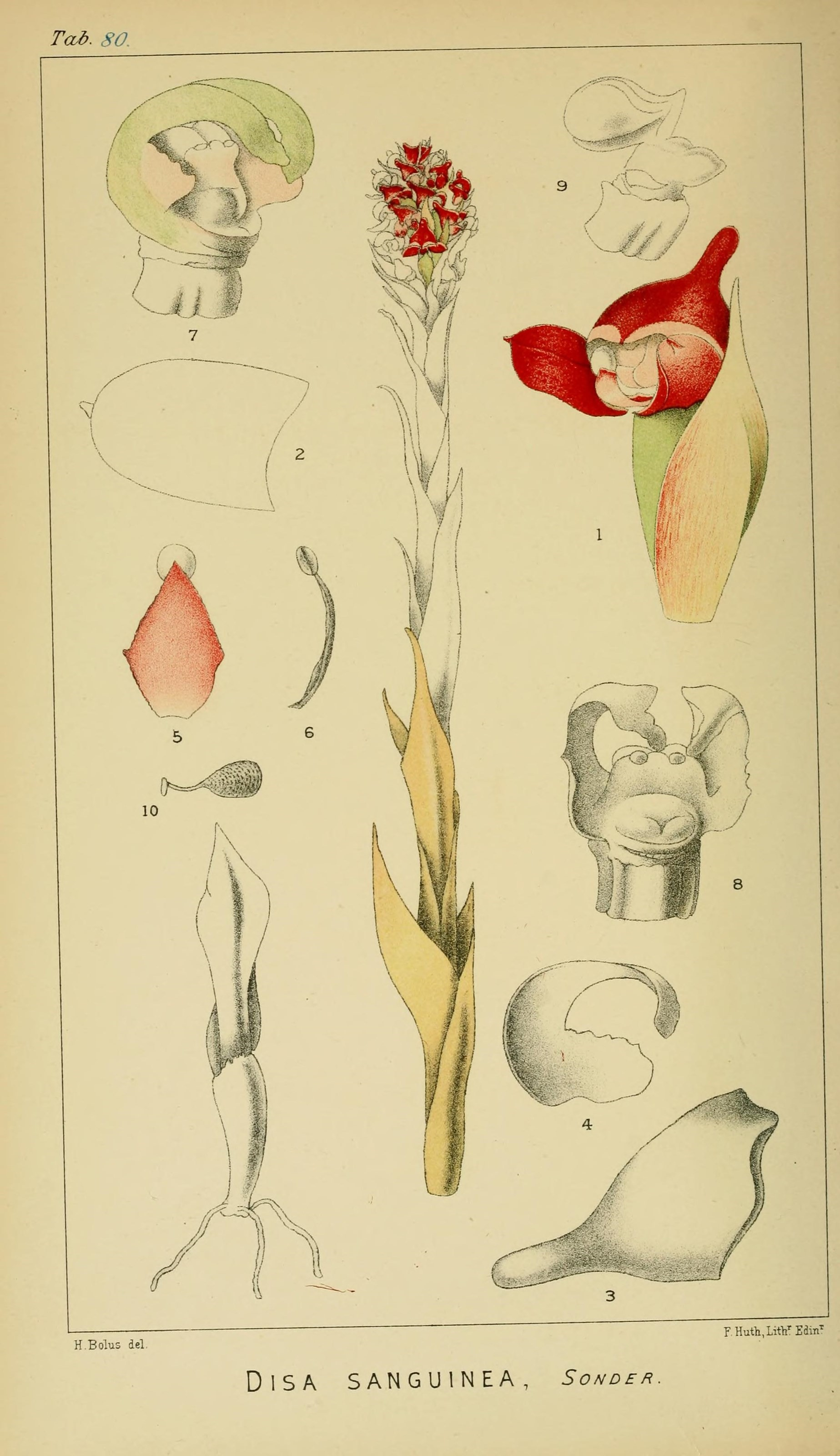

Scientific classification
- Kingdom: Plantae
- Clade: Tracheophytes
- Clade: Angiosperms
- Clade: Monocots
- Order: Asparagales
- Family: Orchidaceae
- Subfamily: Orchidoideae
- Genus: Disa
- Species: D. sanguinea

Binomial name
- Disa sanguinea Sond.

Synonyms
- Disa huttonii Rchb.f.

= Disa sanguinea =

Species of flowering plant

Disa sanguinea, the blood disa, is a perennial plant and geophyte belonging to the genus Disa. The plant is endemic to KwaZulu-Natal and the Eastern Cape and occurs in the Amathole Mountains, Winterberg and Sani Pass. The plant is considered rare.
