= R345 (South Africa) =

Regional route in South Africa

Regional route R345
- R345 route map

Route information
- Length: 176 km (109 mi)

Major junctions
- From: R72 near Bell, Ngqushwa
- To: R351 in Cathcart

Location
- Country: South Africa

Highway system
- Numbered routes of South Africa
← R344	→ R346

The R345 is a Regional Route in South Africa that connects the R72 near Bell in the Ngqushwa Local Municipality with Cathcart passing through Peddie, the Great Fish River Nature Reserve, Alice and Hogsback. It is co-signed with the R63 between Alice and Fort Hare. In the eighties, the route started in Hamburg; however, this section is no longer part of the R345 by 2012.

From its southern origin, the route heads northwest to Peddie, where it crosses the N2. It continues north to Alice, where it is co-signed with the R63 for a 9.6 km long section heading east. Afterwards it turns northwest and passes over the Hogsback Pass to reach the N6 in Cathcart. The official end is reached at the intersection with the R351.

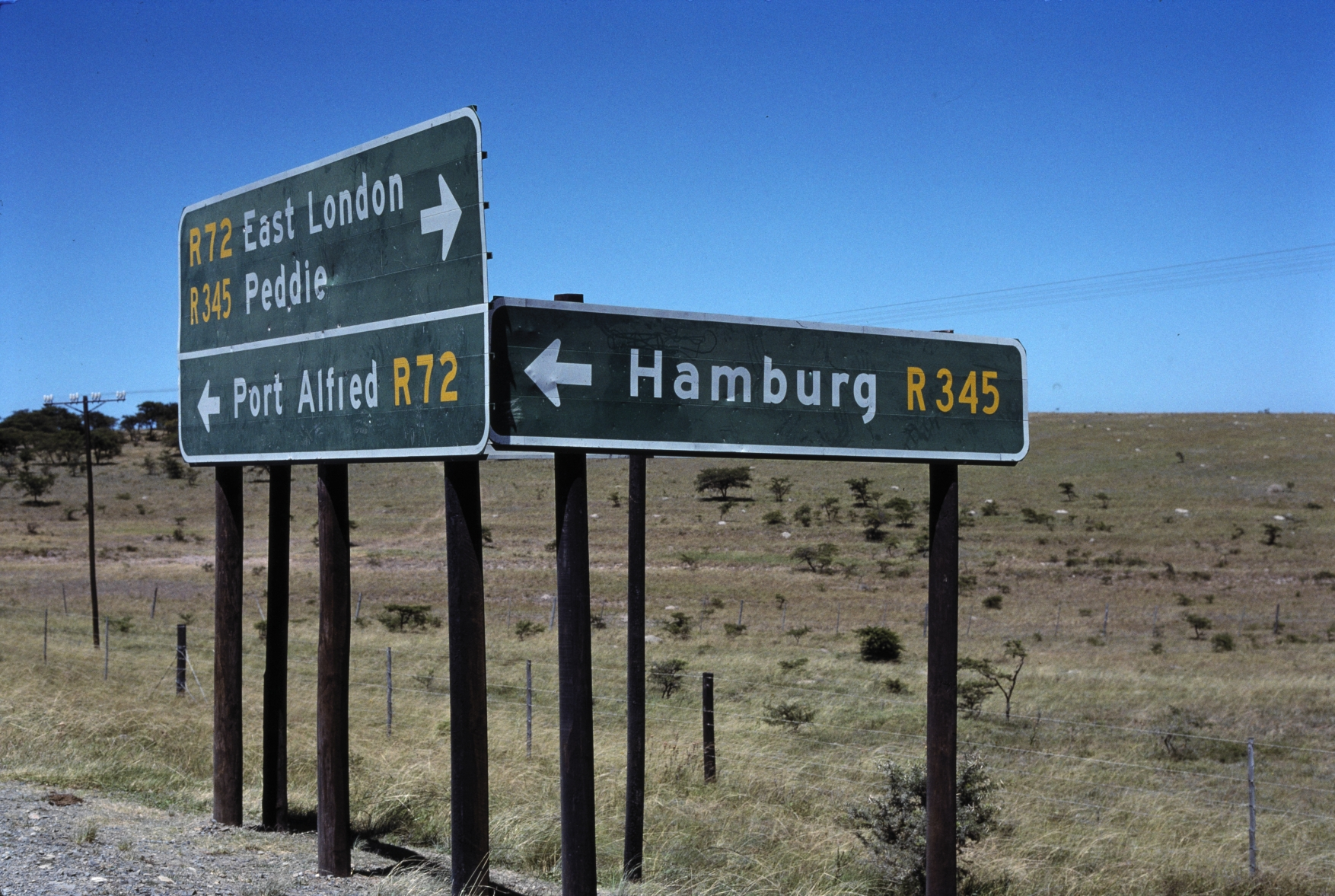
Old road sign at the intersection of R72 with the R345 to Hamburg. February 1986

In the eighties, the route started from Hamburg and was co-signed between Bell and the current terminus 4.2 km north of the settlement. By 2024, this section was no longer signed as R345. The route from the R72 to Hamburg is now designated as MR 0522, and the R345 starts at the intersection with the R72.
