= Fort Beaufort Hospital =

- Eastern Cape Department of Health

Geography
- Location: Fort Beaufort, Eastern Cape, South Africa
- Coordinates: 32°46′50″S 26°38′08″E

Organisation
- Care system: Public
- Type: Community

Services
- Emergency department: Yes
- Beds: ~65

Links
- Website: Fort Beaufort Hospital
- Other links: List of hospitals in South Africa

Fort Beaufort Hospital is a Provincial government funded hospital in the Raymond Mhlaba Local Municipality area in Fort Beaufort, Eastern Cape in South Africa.

The hospital departments include Emergency department, Paediatric ward, Maternity ward, Out Patients Department, Surgical Services, Medical Services, Operating Theatre & CSSD Services, Pharmacy, Anti-Retroviral (ARV) treatment for HIV/AIDS, Post Trauma Counseling Services, X-ray Services, Laundry Services, Kitchen Services and Mortuary.
