= Donga =

Donga may refer to:

- Donga Department, a department of Benin
- Donga, Nigeria, a town and Local Government Area in Taraba State, Nigeria
- Donga River, a river of Nigeria and Cameroon
- Donga Range, a mountain range in Bhutan, Lower Himalayan Range
- Donga (film), a 1985 Indian Telugu-language film starring Chiranjeevi
- Donga (magazine), a South African literary magazine 1976–1978
- The Dong-a Ilbo or DongA, a newspaper in South Korea
- Dong-a University, a South Korean university
- Donga (musician), recorder of Brazilian samba
- Donga, a form of stick-fighting pioneered by the Nilotic Surma people
- Donga, a portable building used for temporary accommodation in Australia
- Donga, the South African English term for a gully
- Donga, character portrayed by Naveen Kaushik in the 2025 Indian film Dhurandhar

== See also ==
- Donka (disambiguation)
- Dongas, a tribe of UK road protesters
- Ranga The Donga, a 2010 Indian film
