= Chief Ngwenyathi Dumalisile =

Xhosa Traditional Leader

Ngwenyathi Dumalisile was enthroned in 2010 as a Xhosa chief of the AmaJingqi in Willowvale, in the Mbhashe Local Municipality in the Eastern Cape. The chief is fondly known as Tshawe to his followers. AmaJinngqi is a rural village situated in the former Transkei’s Willowvale area. The Amajingqi Traditional Council has cluster of 22 villages under its jurisdiction, an area covering 161.57 km^{2} with a population of 11441 (70.81 per km^{2}).

== Family ==
The Chief was born to Chief Mandlenkosi Dumalisile and Nkosikazi Nobantu Dumalisile. His father ruled the area for 45 years before stepping down, when he turned 80 years old.

Chief Ngwenyathi Dumalisile married Princess Nomathamsanqa Dumalisile of AmaBhaca in January 1992. She was a trained teacher and managed the education-centred projects. This included supervising the building of a community library facility in which children could read, play and study. She resigned from her teaching job in 2013 to work with her husband to realise the 30-year development programme of AmaJingqi. The princess died unexpectedly in St George's Hospital in Port Elizabeth in the early hours of 19 May 2016 from an aneurysm.

Chief Ngwenyathi Dumalisile and his princess had three children, Ngcwelekazi, Nkosendalo and Thina.

== Home ==
The chief's homestead, known as the Shixini Great Place, contains a mobile charging bank and an information centre where community members can access the internet and print documents.

== Education ==
Chief Ngwenyathi Dumalisile obtained a B.A. in Law from the University of the Transkei (now Walter Sisulu University), where he studied legal theory and politics. He also holds diplomas in Business Management and Retail Marketing from the University of Witwatersrand.

While in India receiving his diplomatic training, he abandoned his political career and decided against being a foreign diplomat before returning home to the Transkei.

== Work ==
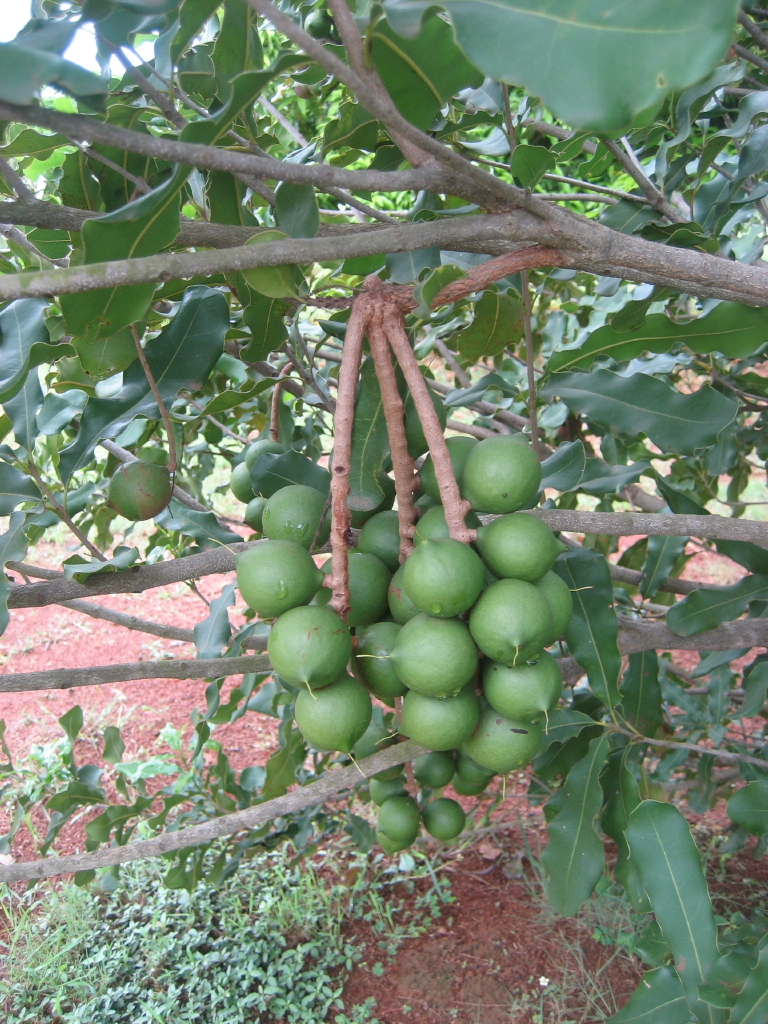
Macadamia (4507010499)

Upon returning home from India, he could not find a job so he started his own business selling medical equipment bought in Germany. He was enthroned in 2010 when his father Chief Mandlenkosi Dumalisile stepped down.

Dumalisile was involved in the struggle against South African Apartheid government then worked in the government's Public Service Commission and Department of Foreign Affairs.

"Towards 30-Year Rural-Based Industrialisation: AmaJingqi Community Development Path", written by Chief Ngwenyathi Dumalisile documented the vision to transform AmaJingqi from a poor, remote area to a successful model for rural development. The chief has partnered with stakeholders such as government, parastatals, non-governmental organizations and the province's Nelson Mandela Metropolitan University. His rural industrialisation plan was launched in the hope that it would encourage a return to traditional values and help attach a high value to education.

He approached South Africa's Department of Energy to identify and make use of the area's natural resources for development purposes. Together they identified macadamia as a low-volume, high income crop which would be suitable for the area's physiography. He launched the Eastern Cape's second macadamia farming project in 2015. Between August and December 2015, 50 people had been trained and started working full-time planting the seed, tilling the land and erecting fences. 142 more jobs were created in his collaboration with the Department of Water Affairs and Environmental Affairs to treat water and eradicate invasive alien plants. The project, which already generates income and upskills members of the community was projected to cover 3km2 of land and create an additional 300 jobs, boosting the area's poor economy.

In his efforts to improve AmaJingqi's underserved education, nine educare centres were established and registered, giving 217 children access to early learning. AmaJingqi's eight public schools all now have libraries with iPad stations. Youth-run extramural activities include reading, soccer and computer literacy programmes for which the co-ordinators were trained.

His partnership with The Services SETA resulted in R20 million of funding to use towards training people in various fields such as enterprise development.

He sits on the boards of Indibano to Harvest & Shekinah Developmental Networks and is a member of Congress of Traditional Leaders of South Africa.

== Legislation ==
In 2015, he approached the South African Police Service (SAPS) about the rapid spread of stores in Willowvale that were suspected of selling liquor without valid licenses. Dumalisile believed that the mushrooming of illegal taverns would result in more crime in the area. During the operation, in collaboration with the SAPS and the Eastern Cape Liquor Board, 428 litres of liquor was confiscated, nine cases of illegal trade were opened, with fines were issued to the accused.

== See also ==
- Nkonkobe Local Municipality
- Macadamia
