= Binfield Park Dam =

- Interactive map of Binfield Park Dam
- Official name: Binfield Park Dam
- Country: Eastern Cape, South Africa
- Location: Amathole Mountains
- Coordinates: 32°41′13″S 26°54′16″E
- Purpose: Irrigation, drinking water
- Opening date: 1986 (established); 1987 (commissioned)
- Owner: Department of Water Affairs

Dam and spillways
- Type of dam: Gravity dam
- Impounds: Tyhume River
- Height: 60 m (200 ft)
- Length: 1,555 m (5,102 ft)

Reservoir
- Creates: Binfield Park Dam Reservoir
- Total capacity: 36.83×10^{6} m^{3} (1.301×10^{9} cu ft)
- Surface area: 187 ha (460 acres)

Binfield Park Dam is a dam on the Tyhume River, near Alice, Eastern Cape, South Africa. It was established in 1986, and commissioned in 1987.

The villagers underused the Binfield Park Dam and vicinity areas located nearby – no fishing, aquaculture, irrigation or recreation. It is concluded that with the help from Government and institutions, the appropriate use of indigenous knowledge and the dam can benefit the communities and the environment regarding ecotourism or ecofeminitourism.

== See also ==
- List of reservoirs and dams in South Africa
- List of rivers of South Africa

== Sources ==
- List of South African Dams from the Department of Water Affairs and Forestry (South Africa)
