= Odendaal =

Odendaal is a surname. Notable people with the surname include:

- André Odendaal (born 1954), South African historian and former first-class cricketer
- Burger Odendaal (born 1993), South African rugby union player
- Fox Odendaal (1898–1966), South African politician
- Hein Odendaal (born 1942), South African medical doctor
- Hendrik Odendaal (born 1979), South African swimmer
- Steven Odendaal (born 1993), South African motorcycle racer
- Welma Odendaal (born 1951), South African writer
- Willie Odendaal (born 1990), South African rugby union player
