= Winterberg (Eastern Cape) =

Mountain range in the Eastern Cape, South Africa

Coordinates: 32°39′S 26°17′E

The Great Winterberg is an extensive east–west mountain range lying immediately north of the small towns of Bedford, Adelaide and Fort Beaufort in the Eastern Cape of South Africa. Elevation on average is about 1800 metres above sea-level. The Great Winterberg Peak north of Adelaide rises to 2371 metres, high enough to be occasionally covered in snow. The underlying geology consists of shales and sandstones of the Beaufort Series of the Karoo System, frequently with dolerite intrusions. Rainfall on the southern slopes (facing the sea) is fairly high. A notable pass over the range is the Katberg Pass built by Andrew Geddes Bain in 1860–64.
