= Hogsback Pass =

Mountain pass in South Africa

Coordinates: 32°36′48.9″S 26°54′48.3″E

Hogsback Pass is situated in the Eastern Cape province of South Africa on the regional road R345, between Alice and Cathcart. It was built in 1932. The pass reaches an altitude of 706 m above sea level. With a gradient of 1:5, the pass is particularly steep, but most of it is tarred. Only the last approximately 2 km is a good gravel road, intentionally left that way to preserve the village’s rural atmosphere.
