= Katrivier Dam =

- Interactive map of Katrivier Dam
- Official name: Katrivier Dam
- Country: South Africa
- Location: Seymour, Eastern Cape
- Coordinates: 32°34′8″S 26°45′2″E
- Purpose: Irrigation and domestic use
- Opening date: 1969
- Owner: Department of Water Affairs

Dam and spillways
- Type of dam: multi-arch
- Impounds: Kat River
- Height: 52 m
- Length: 460 m

Reservoir
- Creates: Katrivier Dam Reservoir
- Total capacity: 24 690 000 m³
- Catchment area: 260 km^{2}
- Surface area: 212.9 ha

Katrivier Dam is a multi-arch type dam located on the Kat River, near Seymour, Eastern Cape, South Africa. It was established in 1969. The primary purpose of the dam is to serve for irrigation and domestic use. The hazard potential of the dam has been ranked high (3).

== See also ==
- List of reservoirs and dams in South Africa
- List of rivers of South Africa
