= Katberg Pass =

Coordinates: 32°27′21.8″S 26°39′17.0″E

Katberg Pass is a mountain pass situated in the Eastern Cape province of South Africa, on the R351 between Seymour and Whittlesea. The pass climbs almost 700 meters in altitude to summit at 1622m ASL. The average gradient is 1:15 with some sections as steep as 1:3.

Construction commenced in 1854 and was built by Andrew Geddes Bain. He was unable to complete it, so it was ultimately completed by Adam de Smidt. The pass takes its name from the Kat River, a tributary of the Great Fish River.
