= Keiskamma River =

River in the Eastern Cape, South Africa

Keiskamma River Keiskammarivier
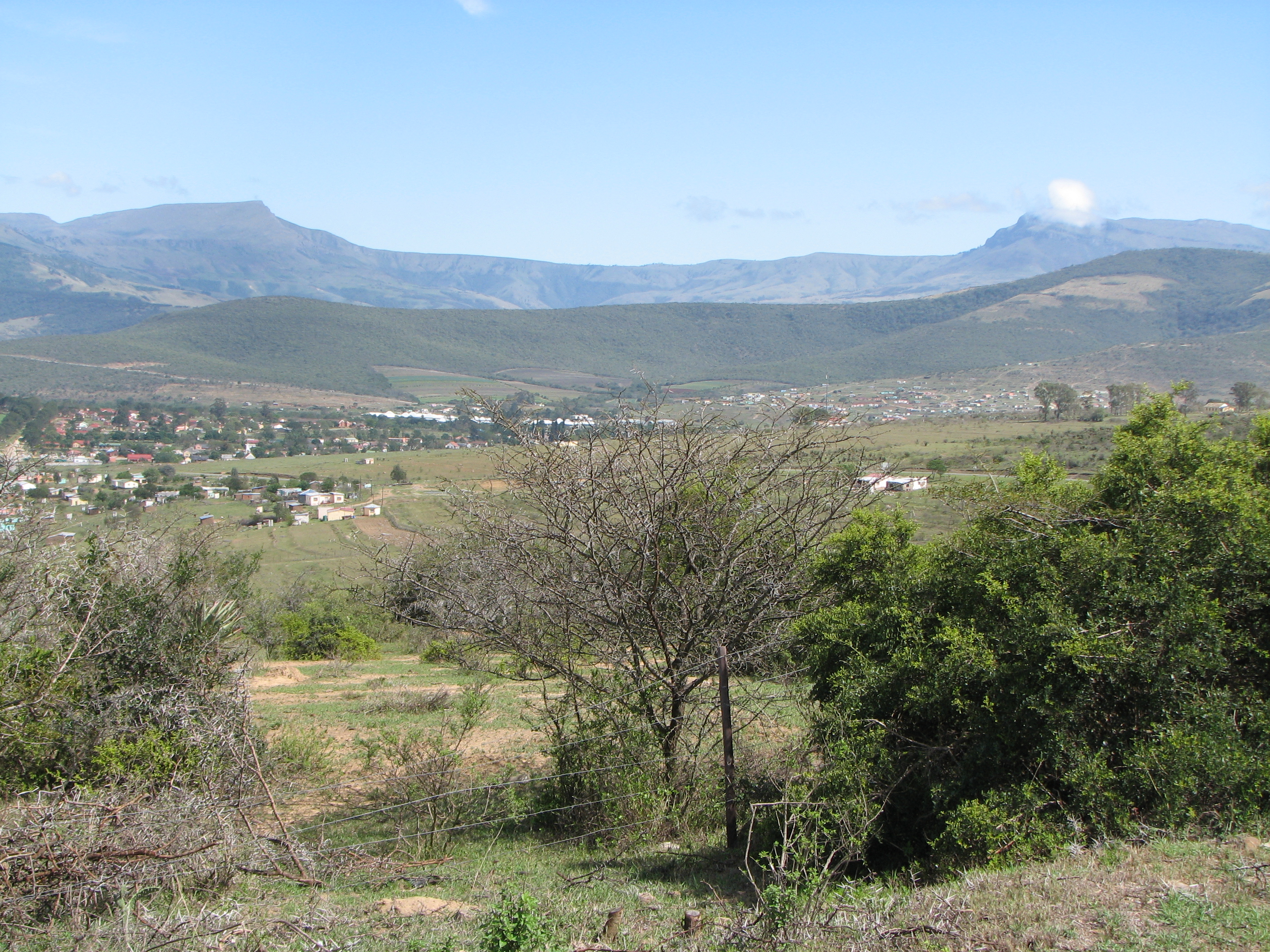
- general view of Keiskammahoek where the sources of the Keiskamma River lie

- Location of the Keiskamma River mouth
- Etymology: Meaning "sweet water" in the Khoekhoe language

Location
- Country: South Africa
- Province: Eastern Cape Province

Physical characteristics
- Source: Near Keiskammahoek
  - location: Amatola Mountains
  - elevation: 1,500 m (4,900 ft)
- Mouth: Indian Ocean
  - location: Near Hamburg
  - coordinates: 33°17′0″S 27°29′20″E
  - elevation: 0 m (0 ft)
- Length: 160 km (99 mi)

Basin features
- Tributaries
  - right: Tyhume

The Keiskamma River (Afrikaans: Keiskammarivier) is a river in the Eastern Cape Province in South Africa. The river flows into the Indian Ocean in the Keiskamma Estuary, located by Hamburg Nature Reserve, near Hamburg, midway between East London and Port Alfred. The Keiskamma flows first in a southwestern and then in a southeastern direction after meeting its main tributary, the Tyhume River.

The Keiskamma River marked the border between the Cape Province and former British Kaffraria, known also then as Queen Adelaide's Province, until 1847.

Presently this river is part of the Mzimvubu to Keiskamma Water Management Area.

== Ecology ==
There is a small population of the endangered Eastern Province rocky (Sandelia bainsii) in the Tyhume River, part of the Keiskamma river basin.

== Dams ==
- Sandile Dam

== See also ==
- List of rivers of South Africa
- List of estuaries of South Africa
