= Balfour, Eastern Cape =

Balfour
- Location within Eastern Cape Location within South Africa
- Coordinates: 32°32′24″S 26°40′23″E
- Country: South Africa
- Province: Eastern Cape
- District: Amathole
- Municipality: Raymond Mhlaba

Area
  - Total: 7.98 km^{2} (3.08 sq mi)

Population (2011)
  - Total: 3,102
  - Density: 389/km^{2} (1,010/sq mi)

Racial makeup (2011)
  - Black African: 96.9%
  - Coloured: 3.0%
  - Other: 0.1%

First languages (2011)
  - Xhosa: 95.2%
  - Afrikaans: 3.2%
  - Other: 1.5%
- Time zone: UTC+2 (SAST)
- Postal code (street): 5740
- PO box: 5740

Balfour is a town in Raymond Mhlaba Municipality, Amathole District Municipality, in the Eastern Cape province of South Africa.

The village, which lies at the foot of the Katberg, was established as a mission station of the Glasgow Missionary Society in 1828 by John Ross and McDiarmid, and named after Robert Balfour, the first secretary of the society.

Throughout the nine Frontier Wars, the town experienced some heavy fighting. Today, tobacco, citrus, wool and beef farming are practised in the area.
