= Ecca Pass =

Mountain pass

Coordinates: 33°12′02.2″S 26°37′06.8″E

Ecca Pass, is situated in the Eastern Cape province of South Africa, on the regional road R67, between Grahamstown and Fort Beaufort. It was the first pass built by Andrew Geddes Bain as part of the Queen's Road. Bain named the heights and the pass after the Ecca River, a Fish River tributary, which is believed to mean "salty" or "brackish" in the local Khoikhoi language.

Due to Bain's geological investigations here, the Ecca Group was named after the 225- to 270-million-year-old sedimentary blue shales and mudstones at the foot of the pass. Bain is honored by a monument at the summit of the pass.
