= Welma Odendaal =

South African writer

Welma Odendaal (born 1951) is a South African writer writing in Afrikaans.

In 1976 she and Rosa Keet founded the literary magazine Donga. Keerkring, Odendaal's 1977 second collection of short stories, was banned by the South African government shortly after its appearance. In 1978 Donga was banned, and Odendaal lost her job at the government-controlled South African Broadcasting Corporation.

== Works ==
- Getuie vir die naaktes [Witness for the naked], Johannesburg: Perskor, 1974.
- Keerkring [Tropic], Johannesburg: Perskor, 1977.
- Verlate plekke [Abandoned places], Plumstead: Chameleon Press, 1991.
- Landskap met diere [Landscape with animals], Kaapstad: Human & Rousseau, 2009.
- Vreemdeling: 'n Keur Uit Die Kortverhale [Stranger: A Selection From The Short Stories], Kaapstad: Human & Rousseau, 2011
