= Andrew Geddes Bain =

Scottish-born Cape Colony explorer, geologist, and engineer

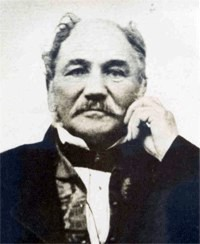
- Born: 11 June 1797; Thurso, Scotland
- Died: 20 October 1864 (aged 67); Cape Town, Cape Colony
- Occupations: Explorer, geologist, engineer, palaeontologist
- Known for: Building mountain passes and roads in the Cape Colony; creating the first geological map of South Africa
- Notable work: Caatje Kekkelbek; or, Life Among the Hottentots (1838)
- Spouse: Maria Elizabeth von Backstrom (m. 1818)
- Children: Thomas Charles John Bain
- Awards: Silver candelabrum and medal for road engineering achievements

Andrew Geddes Bain (baptized 11 June 1797 – 20 October 1864) was a Scottish-born explorer, geologist, engineer, and palaeontologist who lived and worked in the Cape Colony. Widely regarded as the “father of South African geology,” Bain constructed many of the region's most important mountain passes—including Bain's Kloof Pass—and produced the first comprehensive geological map of South Africa in 1852. His son, Thomas Charles John Bain, later followed as a distinguished road engineer.

== Life history ==
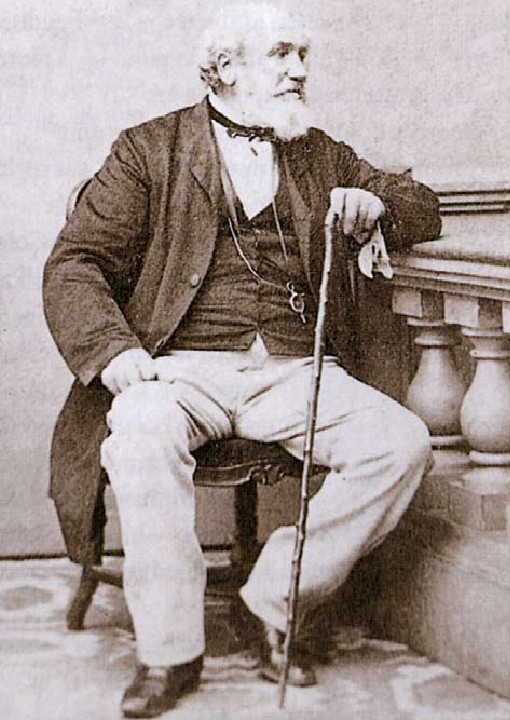
Andrew Geddes Bain

The only child of Alexander Bain and Jean Geddes, both of whom died when Bain was still a young boy, Bain was baptised 11 June 1797 in Thurso, Scotland. He was raised by an aunt who lived near Edinburgh. Here he received a classical education, but no vocational training. In 1816 he emigrated to Cape Town accompanied by his uncle Lieutenant Colonel William Geddes of the 83rd Regiment, who was stationed in the Cape. He married Maria Elizabeth von Backstrom on 16 November 1818 and had 3 sons and 7 daughters. In 1822 he bought property in Graaff Reinet and carried on for some years the business of a saddler. In 1825 he accompanied John Burner Biddulph on a trading expedition to Kuruman, the mission outpost on the edge of the Kalahari and home of Dr. Robert Moffat (father-in-law of David Livingstone). They explored further north and reached Dithubaruba in Bechuanaland, becoming the first recorded Europeans to return safely from so far north. In 1829 they trekked to the vicinity of present-day Kokstad. They were forced to return by hordes of Bantu fleeing Dingaan. During these journeys he discovered his talent for drawing and writing and became a regular correspondent for John Fairbairn's South African Commercial Advertiser. Outspoken, he was sued for libel a number of times by Gerrit Maritz, one of the eventual Voortrekker leaders. He was awarded a special medal in 1832 for 'gratuitously superintending the construction of Van Ryneveld's Pass, Graaff-Reinet'. In 1834 he made another trip to Bechuanaland where he lost his wagons and collection of zoological specimens during an attack by the Matabele, caused by his Griqua guides' stealing some of the King's cattle. During the Cape Frontier Wars in 1833–1834 he served as captain of the Beaufort Levies raised for the defence of the frontier. He tried his hand at farming in the newly annexed Queen Adelaide Province, but lost the farm when the land was returned to the Xhosa in 1836. Later he was engaged to construct a military road through the Ecca Pass, and displayed engineering talents which gave rise to permanent employment as surveyor of military roads under the Corps of Royal Engineers in 1836. During this period he had a part in building the Fish River Bridge, then the largest bridge in the country. He constructed the Queen's Road from Grahamstown to Fort Beaufort. Appointed Engineering Inspector by the Cape Roads Board in 1845 he began construction at Michell's Pass near Ceres in 1848, subsequently followed on completion by Bain's Kloof Pass near Wellington in 1853. During 1853 he met with Russian novelist I. A. Goncharov, while the latter was conducting a journey to Japan on frigate Pallada. He was the first man to attempt to build a road across the Limiet Mountains into the interior for which feat he was presented with table silver and a candelabrum by grateful colonists. Returning to the Eastern Cape in 1854, he built numerous roads and passes including the Katberg Pass near Fort Beaufort.

At around the time he began work as superintendent of the Queen's road in 1837, Bain became enthralled by geology after reading a copy of Lyell's Elements of Geology. He was friendly with William Guybon Atherstone, who was also a keen geologist and fossil collector and who happened to be present at the discovery of Paranthodon africanus Broom at the farm Dassieklip on the Bushmans River, being about half-way between Grahamstown and Port Elizabeth. Bain discovered many fossil remains, including tusked forms that he called 'Bidentals' and toothless animals similar to turtles that he called 'Oudenodons'. After Bain's colelction had been sent to London, these fossil animals were described by Sir Richard Owen and the British Museum, who named the former as several species of the genus Dicynodon and the latter as Oudenodon bainii. Both are now known to be herbivorous mammal-like reptiles of the clade Dicynodontia. Also among the specimens sent to Owen was the so-called Blinkwater monster, which Owen namedPareiasaurus serridens.

He was awarded £200 by the British government in 1845 for his researches. Devoting his spare time to geological studies, Bain prepared in 1852 the first comprehensive geological map of South Africa, a work of great merit, which was published by the Geological Society of London in 1856. Sir Roderick Murchison and Sir Henry de la Beche, prominent geologists of the time, both recommended Bain's appointment as Cape Geological Surveyor in 1852, but since no funds were available, nothing came of it. Bain went to Namaqualand in 1854 and reported to the Government on the copper mines there.

He was granted sick leave to visit England for a second time in 1864, where he was entertained by Sir Richard Owen of the British Museum and Sir Roderick Murchison of the Royal Geographical Society, and was made an honorary member of the Athenaeum Club. His health at this time deteriorated markedly and he returned to South Africa; he died in Cape Town following a heart attack on 20 October 1864. The Colonial Secretary, the Colonial Treasurer, Charles Davidson Bell, the Surveyor-General and Sir Thomas Maclear, her Majesty's astronomer at the Cape, were among the pallbearers.

While resident in Grahamstown he wrote some satirical sketches for local amateur dramatic entertainment and invented the character Caatje Kekelbek or Life Among the Hottentots (1838), also known as Kaatje Kekkelbek (Katie Gossip) who endeared herself forever to South Africans, and held John Philip and other missionaries up to ridicule. Kaatje, the Hottentot girl, uses Hottentot-Afrikaans in the spoken parts, and sings in Afrikaans-English. She comes on stage playing a Jew's-harp:

My name is Kaatje Kekkelbek,
I come from Kat Rivier,
Daar’s van water geen gebrek,
But scarce of wine and beer.
Myn A B C at Philip's school
I learnt a kleine beetje,
But left it just as great a fool
As gekke Tante Meitje.

Bain's journals were published by the Van Riebeeck Society in 1949. A memorial plaque was unveiled at the summit of Bain's Kloof Pass on 14 September 1953, and a memorial to him was erected at the top of the Ecca Pass on the Queen's Road on 7 September 1964. Bain built eight major mountain roads and passes during his career. His son Thomas Charles John Bain was also a road engineer in South Africa.

== Construction projects ==
1. Ouberg/Oudeberg Pass near Graaff-Reinet 1832
2. Van Ryneveld Pass near Graaff-Reinet 1830s
3. Ecca Pass from Grahamstown to Fort Beaufort (The Queen's Road) 1837
4. Michell's Pass near Ceres through the Skurweberg, following the course of the Breede River 1846–48
5. Bain's Kloof Pass near Wellington 1848–52
6. Gydo Pass due north of Ceres up the Skurweberg
7. Houw Hoek Pass from Elgin to Botrivier
8. Katberg Pass near Fort Beaufort 1860–64

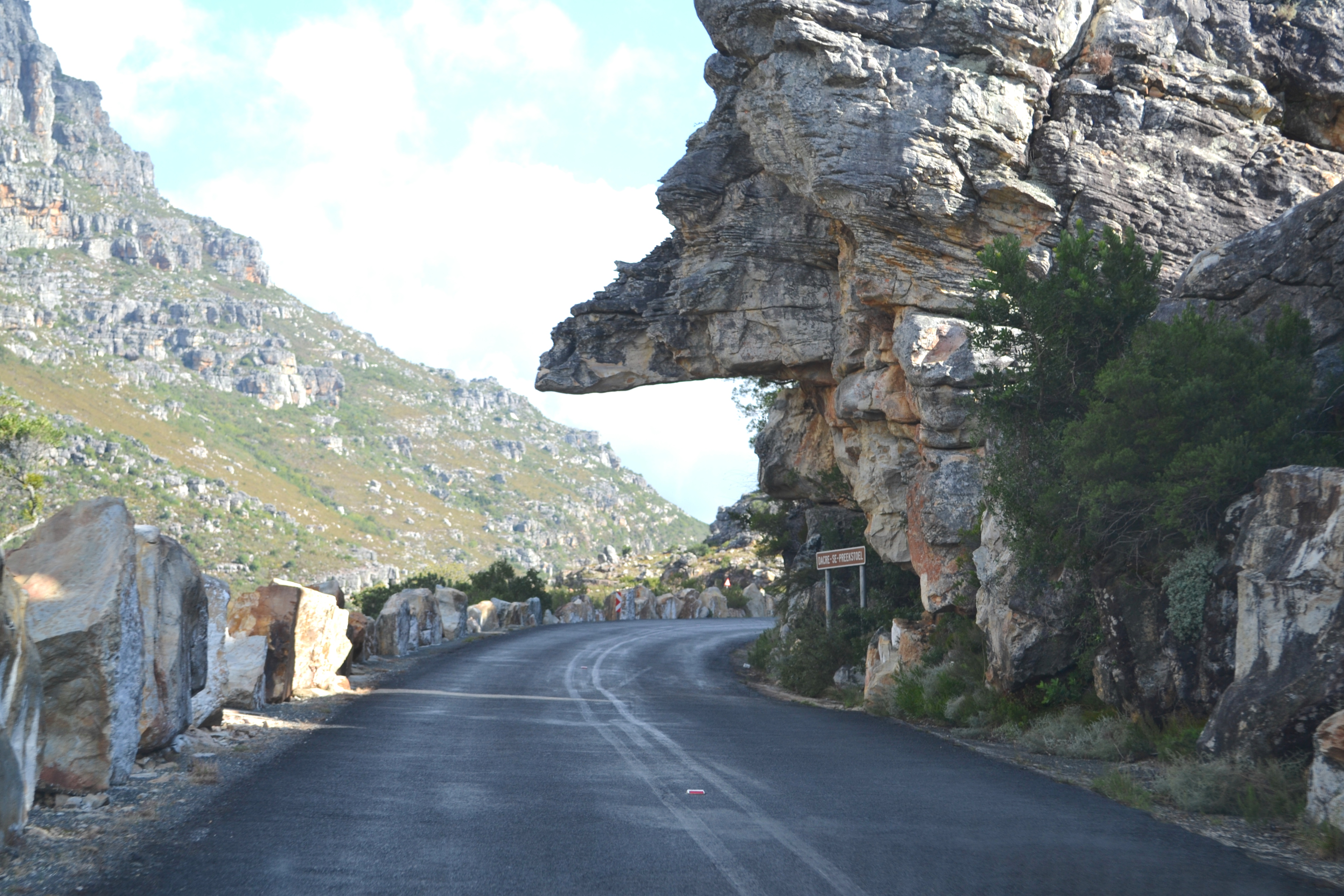
Bainskloof Pass

== Bain's Cape Mountain Whisky ==
Distilled at the James Sedgwick distillery in Wellington, South Africa, Bain's Cape Mountain Whisky is named after Bain, in honour of his construction of the Bainskloof Pass that connects the town of Wellington to the interior of the country in 1853.

== See also ==
- Thomas Charles John Bain
