= Donga (magazine) =

South African multilingual magazine

Donga was a multilingual South African literary magazine which ran from 1976 to 1978.

Welma Odendaal announced plans for the new magazine to delegates at the Afrikaanse Skrywersgilde annual conference in 1976. Established by Odendaal and Rosa Keet, Donga aimed to provide a platform for young writers outside the established literary scene, and included contributions in English, Afrikaans and Setswana. Three individual issues were banned, resulting in the outright ban of the magazine in April 1978, after just eight issues. Odendaal lost her job at the government-controlled South African Broadcasting Corporation.
