= Nxuba Local Municipality =

Nxuba
- Former local municipality
- Seal

- Location in the Eastern Cape
- Coordinates: 32°42′S 26°18′E
- Country: South Africa
- Province: Eastern Cape
- District: Amathole
- Seat: Adelaide
- Wards: 4

Government
  - Type: Municipal council
  - Past Mayor: Louisa Leonora Bruintjies

Area
  - Total: 2,732 km^{2} (1,055 sq mi)

Population (2011)
  - Total: 24,264
  - Density: 8.881/km^{2} (23.00/sq mi)

Racial makeup (2011)
  - Black African: 73.5%
  - Coloured: 20.6%
  - Indian/Asian: 0.3%
  - White: 4.9%

First languages (2011)
  - Xhosa: 69.3%
  - Afrikaans: 24.2%
  - English: 4.4%
  - Other: 2.1%
- Time zone: UTC+2 (SAST)
- Municipal code: EC128

Nxuba Local Municipality was an administrative area in the Amatole District of the Eastern Cape in South Africa. The Fish River, as it is now called, was first named Nxuba River by King Sandile in the 18th century. After municipal elections on 3 August 2016 it was merged into the larger Raymond Mhlaba Local Municipality.

== Main places ==
The 2001 census divided the municipality into the following main places:

Place	Code	Area (km^{2})	Population
Adelaide	21701	2.47	3,771
Bedford	21702	2.54	3,097
Lingelethu	21703	3.54	8,274
Sizakhele	21705	1.25	5,486
Remainder of the municipality	21704	2,724.60	4,207

== Politics ==
The municipal council consisted of eight members elected by mixed-member proportional representation. Four councillors were elected by first-past-the-post voting in four wards, while the remaining four were chosen from party lists so that the total number of party representatives was proportional to the number of votes received. In the election of 18 May 2011 the African National Congress (ANC) won a majority of five seats on the council. The following table shows the results of the election.

Party	Votes				Seats		
Party	Ward	List	Total	%	Ward	List	Total
ANC	4,290	4,318	8,608	59.9	4	1	5
DA	1,509	1,528	3,037	21.1	0	2	2
Nxuba Community Organisation	809	744	1,553	10.8	0	1	1
COPE	303	301	604	4.2	0	0	0
Adelaide Residents Association	244	222	466	3.2	0	0	0
Bedford Residents' Association	63	48	111	0.8	0	0	0
Total	7,218	7,161	14,379	100.0	4	4	8
Spoilt votes	240	238	478				
