= Katberg =

- Location within Eastern Cape Location within South Africa
- Coordinates: 32.491°S 26.671°E
- Country: South Africa
- Province: Eastern Cape
- District: Amathole
- Municipality: Raymond Mhlaba

Area
  - Total: 4.81 km^{2} (1.86 sq mi)

Population (2011)
  - Total: 203
  - Density: 42.2/km^{2} (109/sq mi)

Racial makeup (2011)
  - Black African: 94.6%
  - Coloured: 0.5%
  - White: 4.9%

First languages (2011)
  - Xhosa: 93.7%
  - English: 3.1%
  - Northern Sotho: 1.6%
  - Afrikaans: 1.0%
  - Other: 0.5%
- Time zone: UTC+2 (SAST)

Katberg is a hamlet high up in Raymond Mhlaba Municipality, Amathole District Municipality, in the Eastern Cape province of South Africa.
