= Raymond Mhlaba Local Municipality =

Raymond Mhlaba
- Local municipality
- Country: South Africa
- Province: Eastern Cape
- District: Amathole
- Seat: Fort Beaufort

Government
  - Type: Municipal council
  - Mayor: Bandile Ketelo (ANC)
  - Speaker: Anele Ntsangani (ANC)
  - Chief Whip: Lindelwa Penisi (ANC)

Area
  - Total: 6,358 km^{2} (2,455 sq mi)

Population (2011)
  - Total: 151,379
  - Density: 23.81/km^{2} (61.67/sq mi)
- Time zone: UTC+2 (SAST)
- Municipal code: EC129

Raymond Mhlaba Municipality (Xhosa: uMasipala wase Raymond Mhlaba; Afrikaans: Raymond Mhlaba Munisipaliteit) is a local municipality, in the Eastern Cape province of South Africa. It was established after the August 2016 local elections by merging the Nkonkobe and Nxuba local municipalities.

== Towns/villages in the municipal area ==
- Fort Beaufort (seat)
- Adelaide
- Alice
- Balfour
- Bedford
- Healdtown township
- Hogsback
- Katberg
- Middledrift
- Seymour

== Politics ==
The municipal council consists of forty-two members elected by mixed-member proportional representation. Twenty-one councillors are elected by first-past-the-post voting in twenty-one wards, while the remaining twenty-one are chosen from party lists so that the total number of party representatives is proportional to the number of votes received.

In the election of 4 November 2026 the African National Congress (ANC) won a majority of twenty-six seats.

The following table shows the results of the election.

Party	Ward			List			Total seats
Party	Votes	%	Seats	Votes	%	Seats	Total seats
African National Congress	23,298	55.30	20	25,466	61.44	6	26
South African Communist Party	4,038	9.58	0	3,982	9.61	4	4
Democratic Alliance	2,756	6.54	0	3,046	7.35	3	3
Independent candidates	5,671	13.46	1				1
Economic Freedom Fighters	1,934	4.59	0	2,717	6.56	2	2
Phakama Adelaide Movement	1,441	3.42	0	1,433	3.46	2	2
African Transformation Movement	890	2.11	0	1,311	3.16	1	1
Patriotic Alliance	914	2.17	0	914	2.21	1	1
Pan Africanist Congress of Azania	466	1.11	0	1,255	3.03	1	1
uMkhonto weSizwe Party	287	0.68	0	568	1.37	1	1
4 other parties	439	1.04	0	755	1.82	0	0
Total	42,134	100.00	21	41,447	100.00	21	42
Valid votes	42,134	98.04		41,447	97.39		
Invalid/blank votes	842	1.96		1,110	2.61		
Total votes	42,976	100.00		42,557	100.00		
Registered voters/turnout	90,060	47.72		90,060	47.25		
