= Fort Beaufort =

Fort Beaufort iBhofolo
- KwaMaqoma
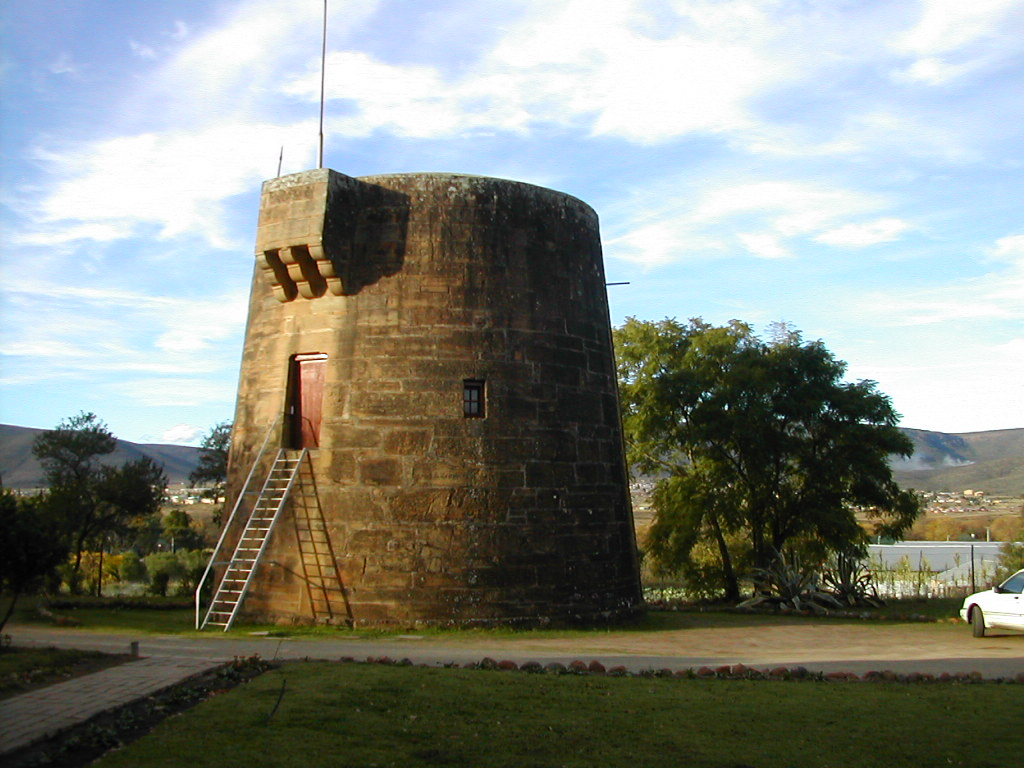
- The martello tower at Fort Beaufort

- Location within Eastern Cape Location within South Africa Location within Africa
- Coordinates: 32°46′44″S 26°38′07″E
- Country: South Africa
- Province: Eastern Cape
- District: Amathole
- Municipality: Raymond Mhlaba
- Established: 1822

Area
  - Total: 82.81 km^{2} (31.97 sq mi)

Population (2011)
  - Total: 25,668
  - Density: 310.0/km^{2} (802.8/sq mi)

Racial makeup (2011)
  - Black African: 83.6%
  - Coloured: 12.9%
  - Indian/Asian: 0.4%
  - White: 2.6%
  - Other: 0.5%

First languages (2011)
  - Xhosa: 76.9%
  - Afrikaans: 15.4%
  - English: 4.7%
  - Other: 3.0%
- Time zone: UTC+2 (SAST)
- Postal code (street): 5720
- PO box: 5720
- Area code: 046

Fort Beaufort (Xhosa: iBhofolo), officially renamed KwaMaqoma in March 2023, is a town in the Amatole District of South Africa's Eastern Cape Province, and had a population of 25,668 in 2011. The town was established in 1837 and became a municipality in 1883. The town lies at the confluence of the Kat River and Brak River between the Keiskamma and Great Fish Rivers. KwaMaqoma serves as a mini-'dormitory' for academic staff and students of Fort Hare University, based in the nearby town of Alice, and is also close to Sulphur Springs.

It is also the birthplace of South African politician and anti-apartheid activist who is also the first Premier of the Eastern Cape Raymond Mhlaba and his former first wife Joyce Meke.

== History ==
The roots of Fort Beaufort lie in a mission station that the Reverend Joseph Williams of the London Missionary Society established in 1816. In 1822, Colonel Maurice Scott of the Royal Warwickshire Regiment constructed a blockhouse about three miles from the mission station as a military frontier post and stronghold against raids by the Xhosa under their chief, Maqoma. The British named the martial structure Fort Beaufort in honour of the Duke of Beaufort, father of Lord Charles Henry Somerset—Governor of the Cape Colony (1814 to 1826). After the 6th Xhosa War (1834–1835), Governor Sir Benjamin d'Urban authorised construction of a fort at the site of the original blockhouse. The new buildings included a military hospital, guard houses, infantry barracks, and officers' quarters.

In 1839, the British commenced work on what is probably the world's only inland Martello tower, a small, circular Napoleonic era design hitherto used only in coastal defences. The tower was completed in 1846. Today, the original howitzer remains mounted on the roof on a traversing carriage that gives it a 360-degree field of fire. The tower has been restored after having served for some time as a public latrine.

In 1840 Fort Beaufort became a town. Around this time Andrew Geddes Bain built the first road, including the Ecca Pass, linking Grahamstown and Fort Beaufort.

During the 8th Xhosa War (1850–53), also known as the War of Mlanjeni, anti-British forces unsuccessfully attacked the town. Harmanus Matroos, alias Ngxukumeshe, was a half-Khoikhoi and half-Xhosa. He started the war on 30 December 1850 by capturing a small outpost near Fort Beaufort. Matroos had served the British in the 7th Xhosa War (1846–47), also known as the War of the Axe. Matroos fell on 8 January 1851 during his third attack on Fort Beaufort.

British troops continued to be stationed in the town until 1870.

In 1949 the first congregation of the Nederduitse Gereformeerde Kerk (Dutch Reformed Church) seceded from Alice due to demographic changes.

== Schools ==
Schools in the area include the historic Healdtown Comprehensive School. Fort Beaufort has number of high schools that include:

Eyabantu High,
Inyibiba High,
Lindani High,
Winterberg High,
Thubalethu High,
Sakhululeka High, and the newly built
Lighthouse Academy.

== Healthcare today ==
Fort Beaufort has three governmental hospitals, namely Fort Beaufort Provincial Hospital, Tower Psychiatric Hospital, and Winterberg TB (previous SANTA) Hospital. There are also seven primary healthcare clinics in the area, namely C.C. Lloyd (in the CBD), Newtown, Hillside, Thozamile, Lulama Kama, Healdtown and Mxelo.

== Notable people ==
- Raymond Mhlaba (first Premier of the Eastern Cape)
- Josiah Gumede (President of the ANC 1927–1930)
- Charlotte Maxeke (First President of the ANCWL)
- Nico Malan (attorney and politician)
- Ken Gampu (Actor)
- Ian Roberts (Actor/Director)
- Donald Gray (Actor)
- Tony Yengeni (Politician)
- Oliver Zono (Rugby Player)
- Ali Mgijima (Rugby Player )(Went to school in the area)
- John Dugard (Professor of International Law)
- Ollie le Roux (Rugby Player)

== Climate ==
Climate data for Fort Beaufort, elevation 455 m (1,493 ft), (1991–2020 normals, extremes 1998–2023)
Month	Jan	Feb	Mar	Apr	May	Jun	Jul	Aug	Sep	Oct	Nov	Dec	Year
Record high °C (°F)	44.5 (112.1)	43.3 (109.9)	42.9 (109.2)	38.6 (101.5)	34.5 (94.1)	32.2 (90.0)	31.9 (89.4)	36.8 (98.2)	41.5 (106.7)	43.6 (110.5)	41.5 (106.7)	43.0 (109.4)	44.5 (112.1)
Mean daily maximum °C (°F)	32.8 (91.0)	32.2 (90.0)	30.8 (87.4)	27.5 (81.5)	25.6 (78.1)	24.0 (75.2)	23.8 (74.8)	24.7 (76.5)	26.1 (79.0)	28.4 (83.1)	29.2 (84.6)	30.8 (87.4)	28.0 (82.4)
Daily mean °C (°F)	24.8 (76.6)	24.5 (76.1)	23.1 (73.6)	19.7 (67.5)	17.5 (63.5)	15.4 (59.7)	15.2 (59.4)	16.1 (61.0)	17.7 (63.9)	20.0 (68.0)	21.1 (70.0)	23.2 (73.8)	19.9 (67.8)
Mean daily minimum °C (°F)	16.7 (62.1)	17.0 (62.6)	15.3 (59.5)	12.1 (53.8)	9.4 (48.9)	6.8 (44.2)	6.5 (43.7)	7.6 (45.7)	9.4 (48.9)	11.6 (52.9)	13.3 (55.9)	15.6 (60.1)	11.8 (53.2)
Record low °C (°F)	9.0 (48.2)	8.4 (47.1)	6.4 (43.5)	0.0 (32.0)	0.5 (32.9)	−2.0 (28.4)	−2.6 (27.3)	−0.5 (31.1)	0.2 (32.4)	3.8 (38.8)	4.6 (40.3)	8.0 (46.4)	−2.6 (27.3)
Average precipitation mm (inches)	52.7 (2.07)	63.7 (2.51)	71.8 (2.83)	42.5 (1.67)	26.1 (1.03)	16.1 (0.63)	17.0 (0.67)	22.7 (0.89)	35.4 (1.39)	48.2 (1.90)	54.5 (2.15)	56.0 (2.20)	506.7 (19.94)
Average precipitation days (≥ 0.25 mm)	6.4	6.9	7.6	5.3	3.8	2.7	2.5	3.3	4.5	6.4	6.3	6.0	61.7
Source: Starlings Roost Weather (precipitation 1877–2023)

== See also ==
- List of Castles and Fortifications in South Africa
