= Amathole Mountains =

Mountain range in South Africa

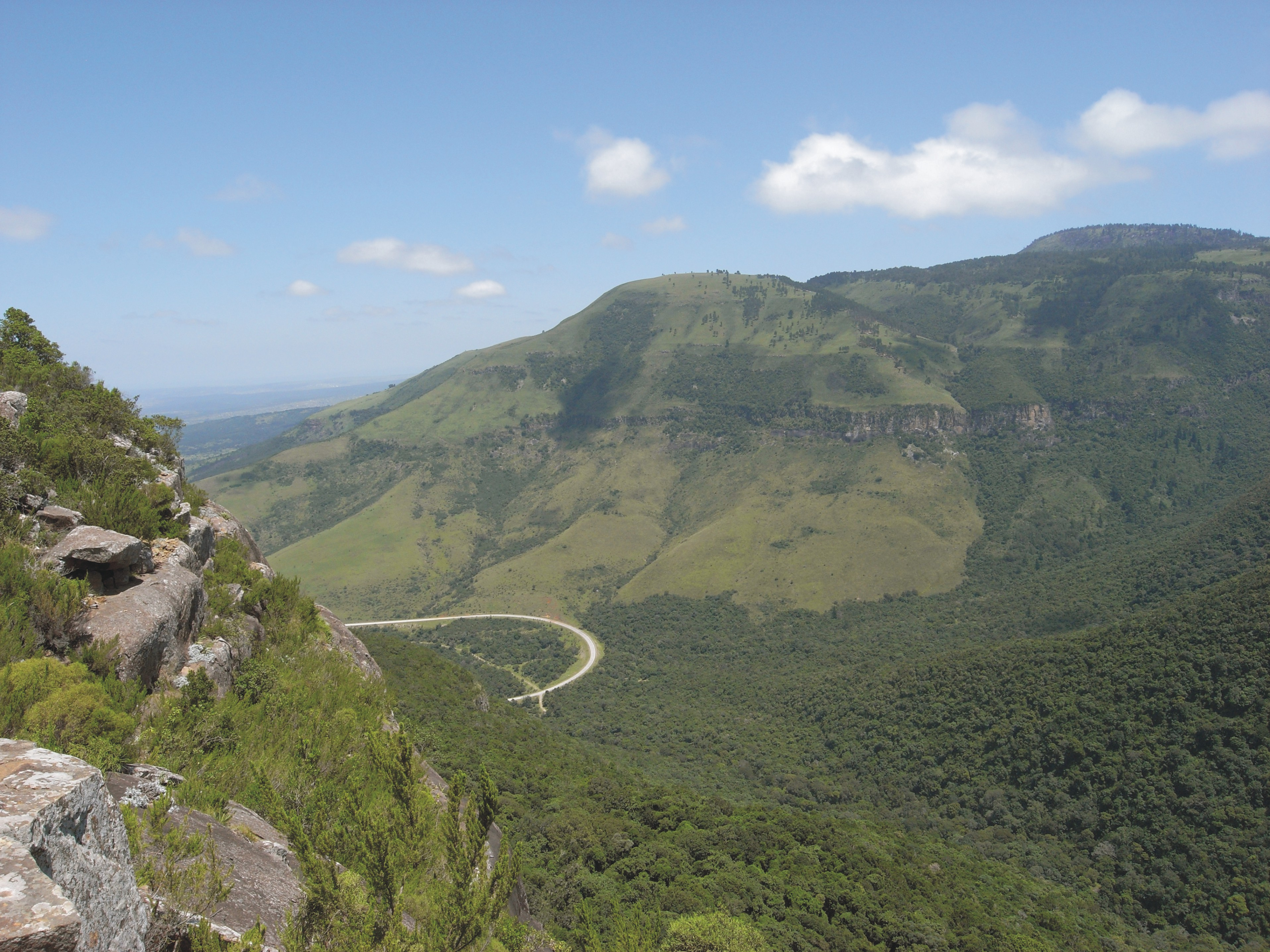
- Auckland Forest in the Amathola Mountains

Highest point
- Peak: Gaika's Kop
- Elevation: 1,963 m (6,440 ft)
- Coordinates: 32°34′50″S 27°12′30″E

Dimensions
- Length: 280 km (170 mi) E/W
- Width: 90 km (56 mi) N/S

Geography
- Location within South Africa
- Country: South Africa
- Province: Eastern Cape

Geology
- Orogeny: Kaapvaal craton
- Rock age: Neoarchean to early Paleoproterozoic
- Rock type(s): Bushveld igneous complex, sandstone

Amatola, Amatole or Amathole (the latter being the most correct) are a range of densely forested mountains, situated in the Eastern Cape province of South Africa. The word Amathole means ‘calves’ in Xhosa, and Amathole District Municipality, which lies to the south, is named after these mountains.

== Geology ==
The Amathole Mountains form part of the southern portion of the Great Escarpment, rising over 1,800 metres above sea level. The escarpment slopes are densely covered in ancient forests of yellowwoods, white stinkwoods, Cape chestnuts and other indigenous trees. Deep indigenous woods like Kologha and Kubusie are some of the largest swaths of forest in South Africa. The mountains are capped with flower-rich montane grassland. Albany thickets also feature prominently in the surrounding area.

The mountains are known for their scenery, forests, ravines, waterfalls and panoramic views. The six-day Amatola hiking trail is one of the top hiking trails in South Africa.

The Amatola Mountains’ geology is characterised by the Beaufort Group (subdivided into the Tarkastad and Adelaide subgroups), which forms part of the Karoo sequence. The sediments were formed by depositions in river channels, floodplains and swamps.

== History and settlement ==
These mountains were originally home to the Khoisan hunter gatherers. The Nguni migrations saw the arrival of the Xhosa herders from the north and the displacement of the Khoisan inhabitants during the mid- to late 17th century CE.

Many of the current settlements in the Amathole region started as military outposts, for example Adelaide, Cathcart and Fort Beaufort. This is because, in the 19th century, this region formed the border between the Cape Colony, and the Xhosa nation to the east. Frequent wars were fought along this border, particularly the 7th Frontier War (Also known as the Amatola War or the 'War of the Axe'). These wars were usually fought over farming land, cattle theft and legal jurisdiction and they saw the steady movement of the Cape's border eastward, into Xhosa lands. It was into the Amatola mountains’ forested ravines that the Xhosa armies retreated after the setbacks of these wars, so the Cape built the military towns in an effort to secure these borderlands for its farmers.

== Towns ==
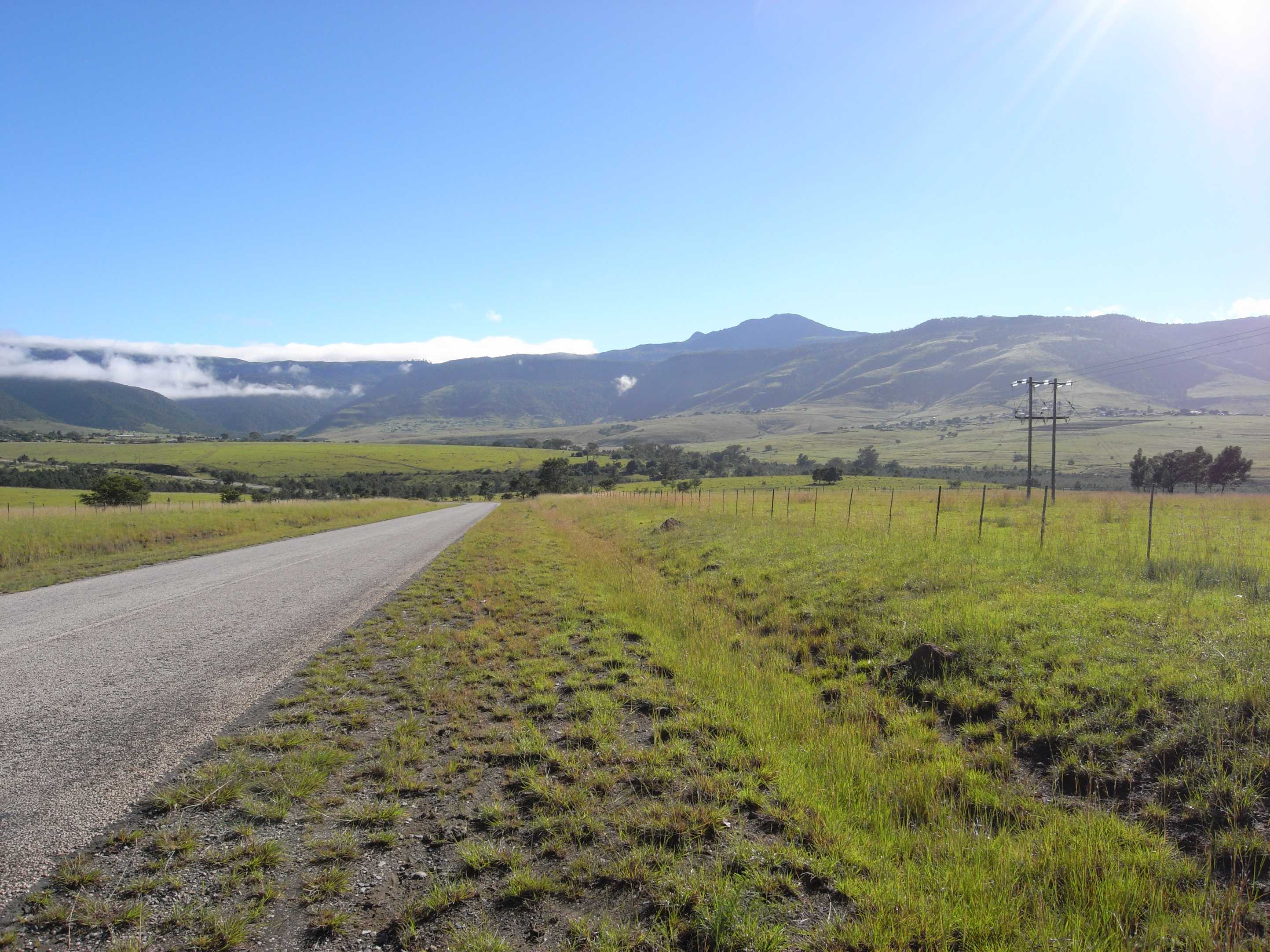
Tyhume valley and the view to the Hogsback pass in the mountains.

- King William's Town is the old centre of the region. In this city there is a large museum, the Amathole Museum, with old collections.
- At the foot of the mountains, in the town of Alice, is the campus of the University of Fort Hare.
- Stutterheim, beneath the Kologha range to the east, initially served as a settlement for disbanded soldiers who had fought in the 'Amatola War'.
- Hogsback's first residents were farmers. This town is a popular holiday destination that is reputed to have inspired Tolkien's Middle Earth.
- The nearby town of East London is the largest in the region and is South Africa's only river port. The city is out of the mountains and the main administration centre for the Amathole region.

== See also ==
- Geography of South Africa
- The Great Escarpment
- Geology of the Karoo
- Cape Fold Mountains
- List of mountain ranges of South Africa
- SAS Amatola (F145) - a Valour-class frigate of the South African Navy
- Xhosa Wars
