= Hogsback, South Africa =

Hogsback
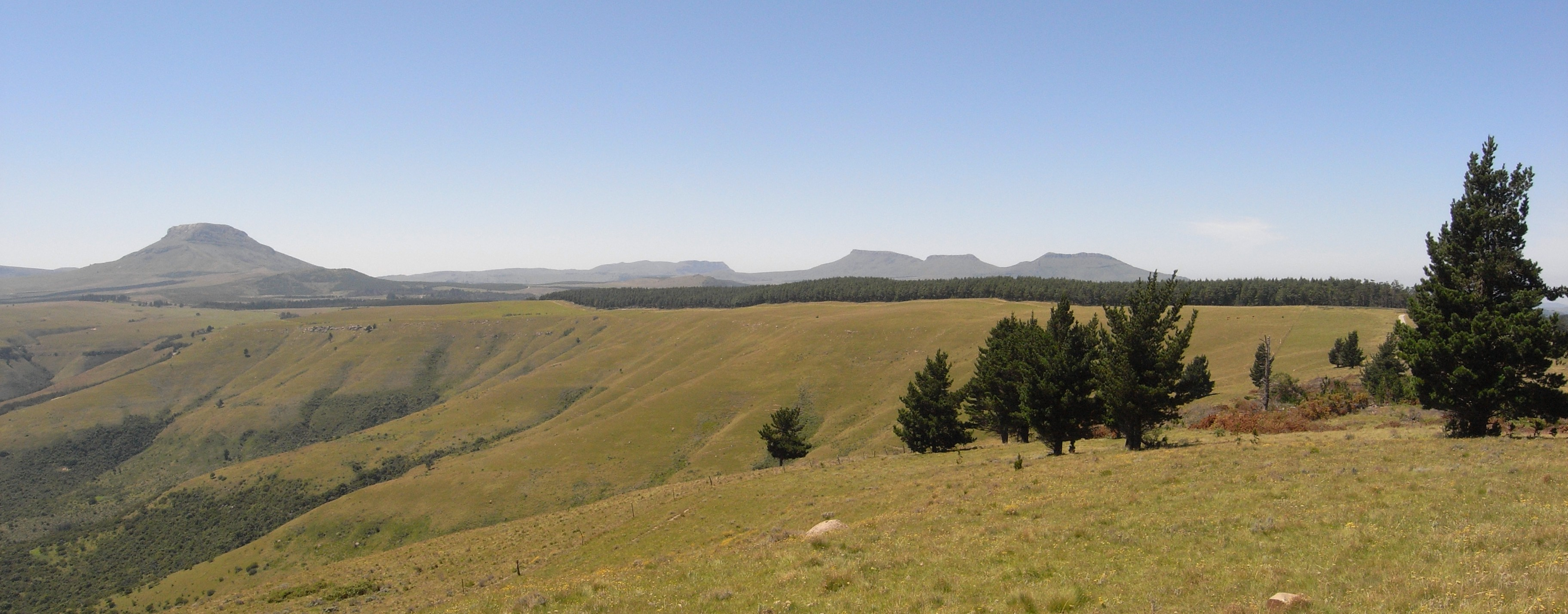
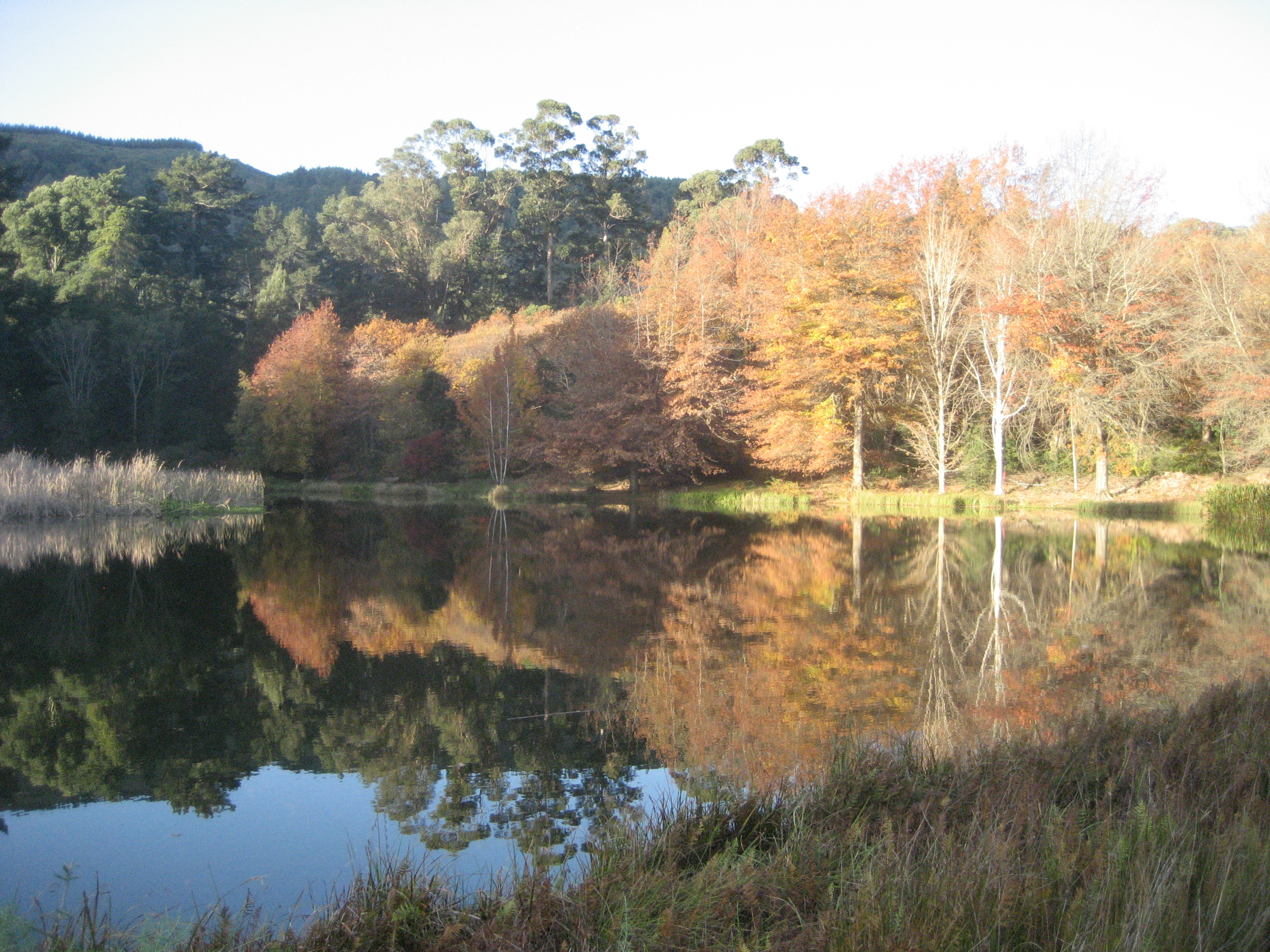
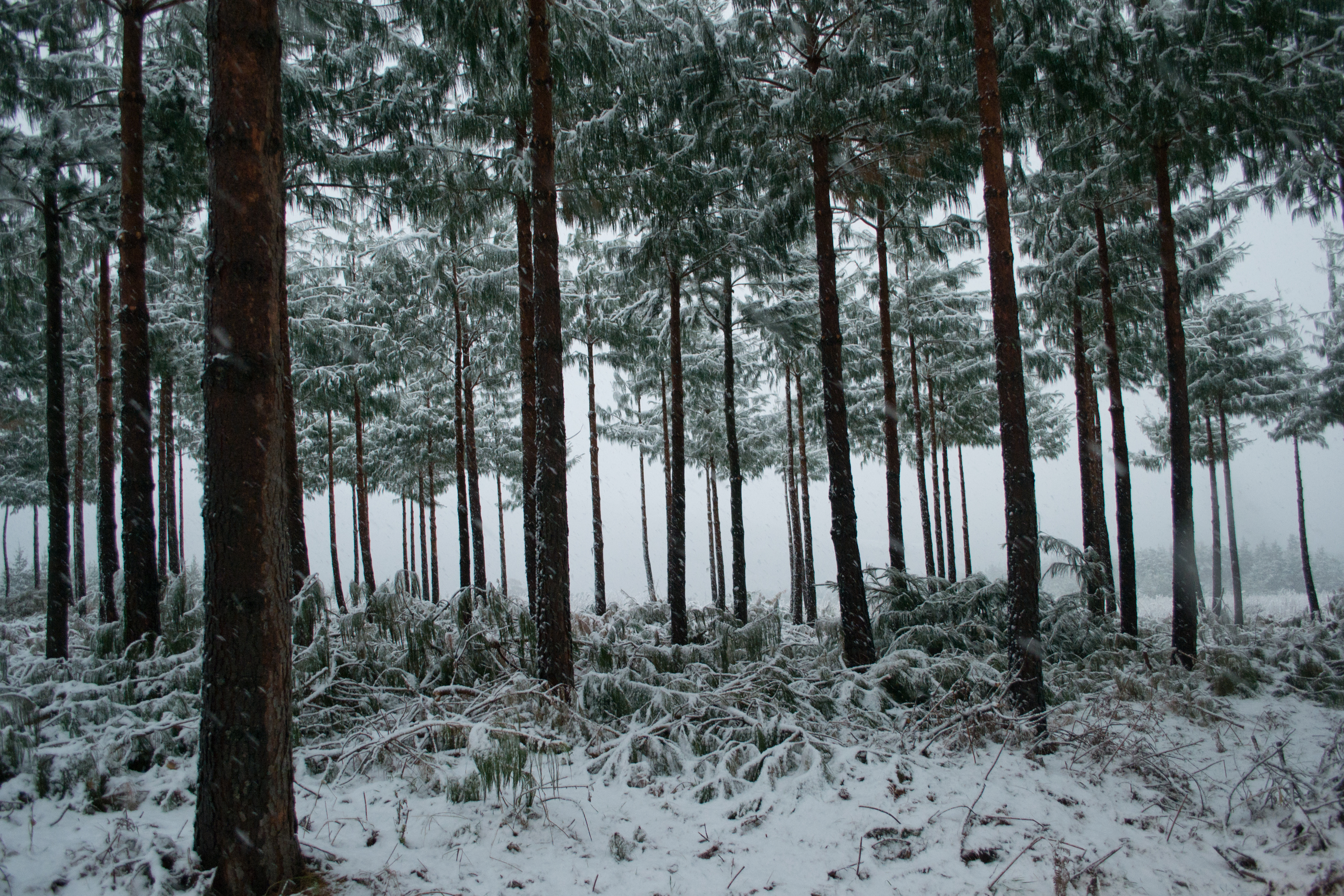
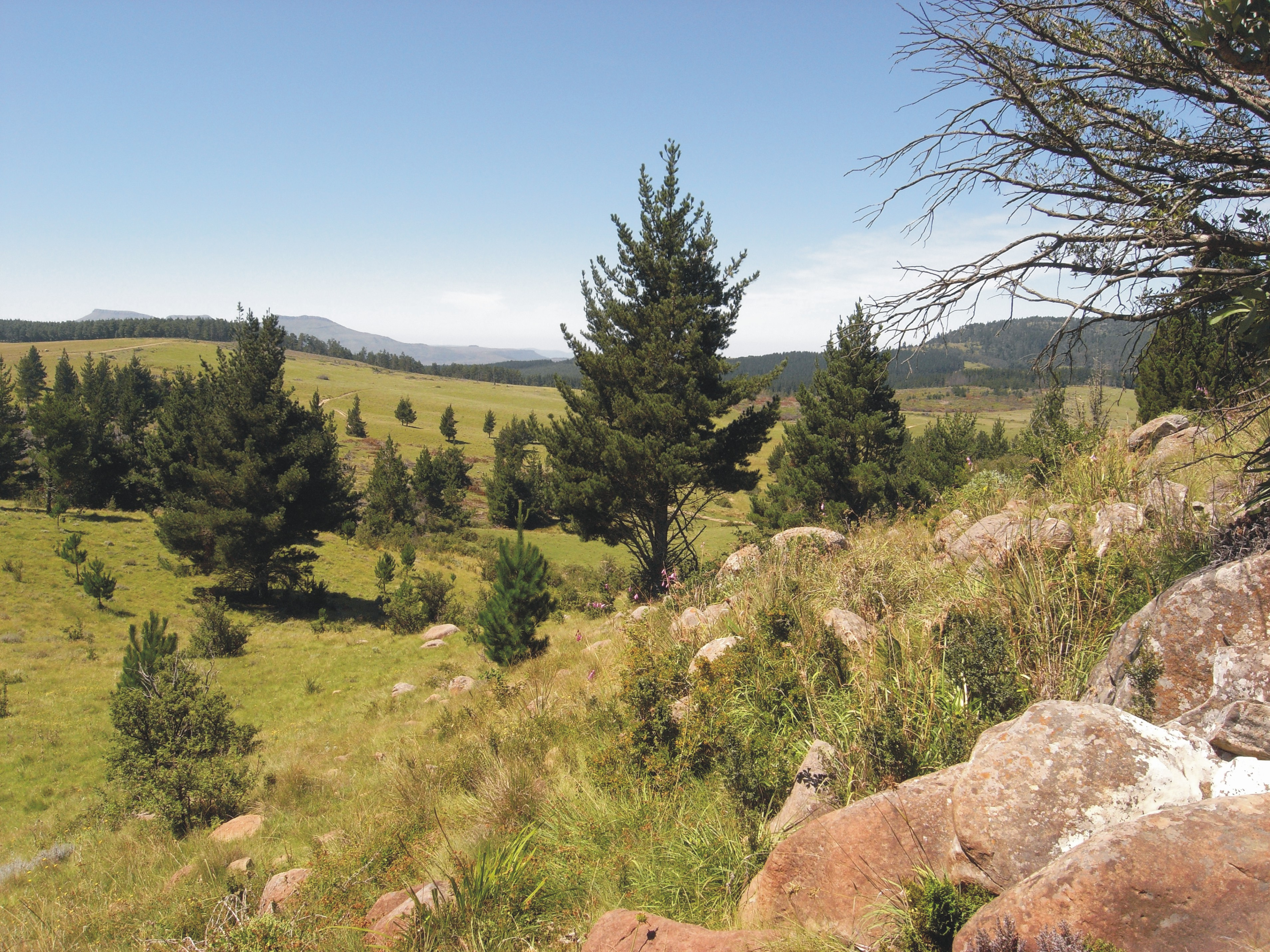
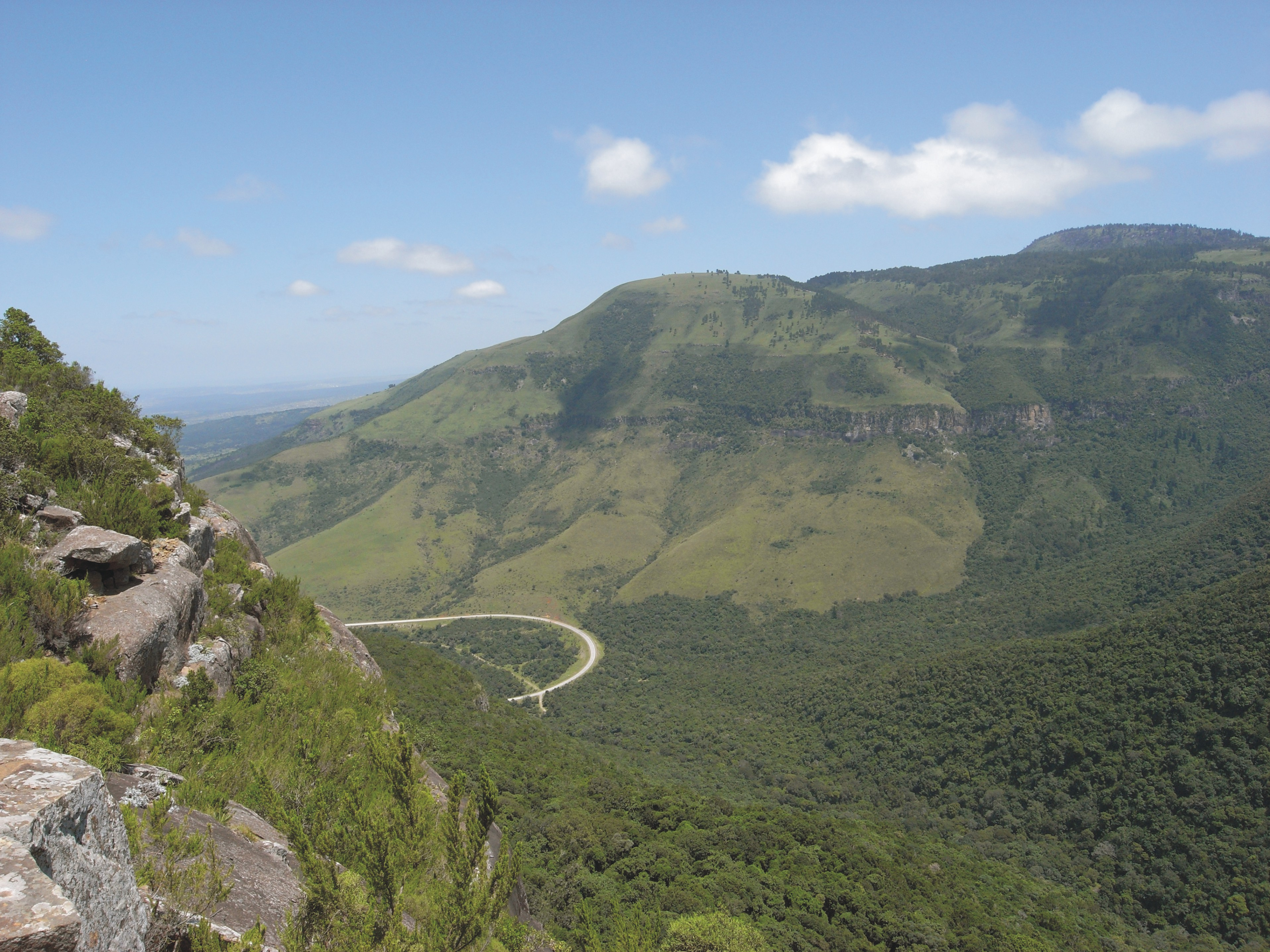
- Clockwise from Top: Hills near Hogsback, Snow in Hogsback, the Hogsback Pass, Menziesberg, lake in Hogsback.
- Nickname: "Where the fairies live"
- Location within Eastern Cape Location within South Africa Location within Africa
- Coordinates: 32.598°S 26.938°E
- Country: South Africa
- Province: Eastern Cape
- District: Amathole
- Municipality: Raymond Mhlaba

Area
  - Total: 13.78 km^{2} (5.32 sq mi)

Population (2011)
  - Total: 1,029
  - Density: 74.67/km^{2} (193.4/sq mi)

Racial makeup (2011)
  - Black African: 65.7%
  - Coloured: 2.2%
  - Indian/Asian: 0.5%
  - White: 30.5%
  - Other: 1.1%

First languages (2011)
  - Xhosa: 63.5%
  - English: 27.7%
  - Afrikaans: 6.0%
  - Other: 2.9%
- Time zone: UTC+2 (SAST)
- PO box: 5721
- Area code: 045
- Website: http://www.hogsback.com/

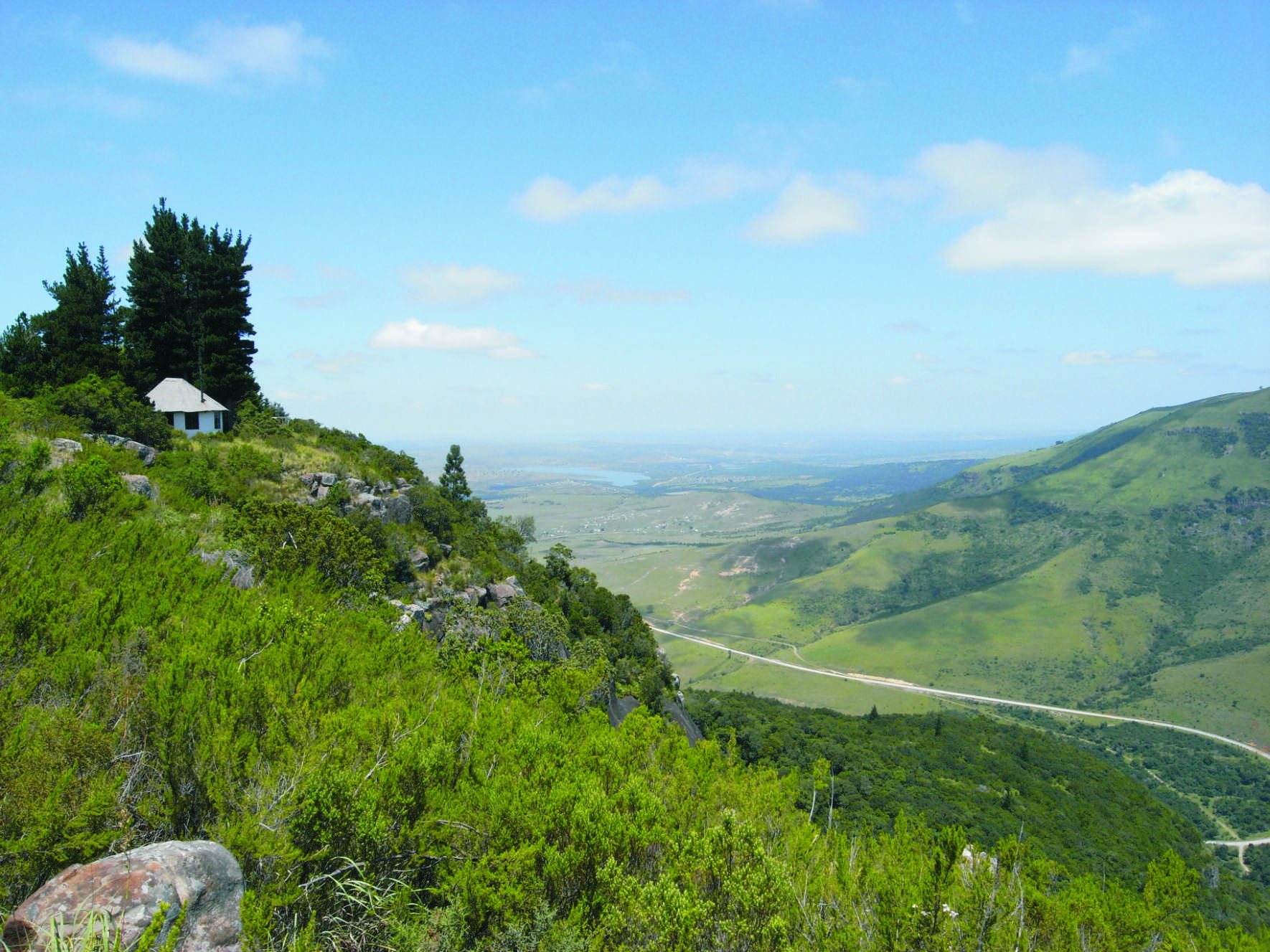
View from The Edge to the Tyhume valley with the Hogsback Pass street

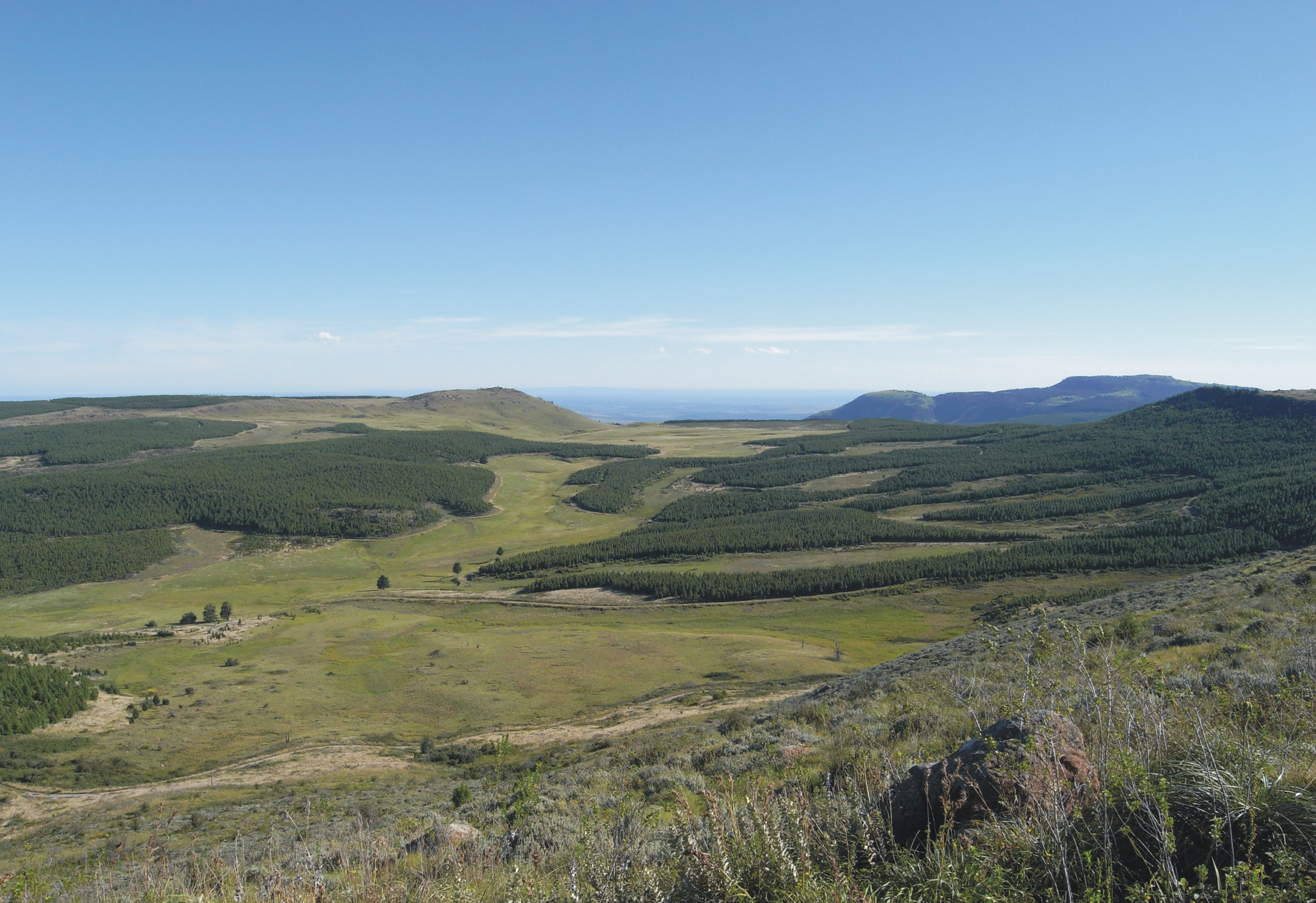
View to Tor Doone near the Hogsback Pass

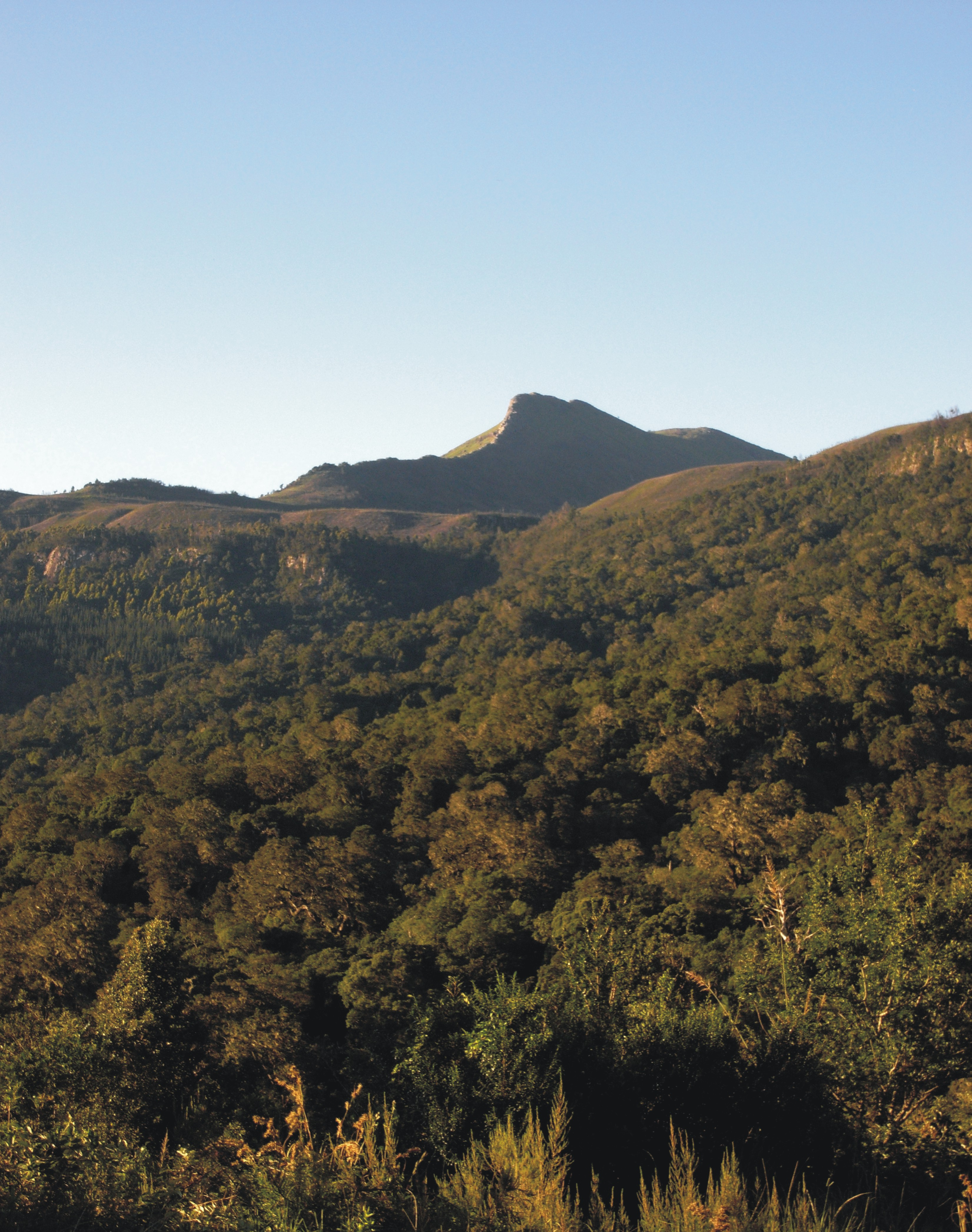
The Hog's from southwest

Hogsback is a mountain village in the Amathole Mountains in the Eastern Cape Province, South Africa.

The area is known for its indigenous Afromontane forests, misty weather, and natural beauty.

== Name ==
There are two (or maybe more) theories as how the village received its name. Some think it was named for Captain Hogg, Commander of Fort Michell. Others think that it is because one of the three peaks that overlook the village which, when seen from a certain angle, resembles a Hog's Back (A hogback is the geological term describing this particular rock formation).

== History ==
The earliest known written reference to 'Hogsback' was found in the journal of the painter Thomas Baines, who passed the 'Hogs Back' while on his travels of the South African interior in 1848. The first known inhabitants of the area were the San people, who left rock art in the region.

The nearby Xhosa tribes called the surrounding area Qabimbola (meaning 'red clay on the face') as the surrounding clay was used for face painting. Gaika's Kop was one of the Xhosa strongholds. British troops were later stationed here and a number of forts were built to guard the border with the Xhosa. One of these forts was Fort Michell, named after Colonel Michell of the Warwickshire regiment, who was at one point in charge of troops in the area. The name has since changed to Fort Mitchell. The outline of Fort Michell, and the first road from Fort Hare can still be seen.

The conflict between the British and Xhosa continued further north and a small settlement began to grow. Some of the first inhabitants of Hogsback were Summerton, Odendaal and Booysens. Thomas Summerton, a gardener from Oxford, has a legacy that survives in the local gardens and his attempts to re-create the English countryside. This can be seen in apple orchards, avenues lined with hazelnut trees, berries, fruits and the flowering plants that have spread throughout the surrounding area. He named his farm Cherrie Orchard and also built a furrow – Summerton's furrow – to carry water from a stream on Tor Doone.

In the 1880s, Collins built a small hotel, called the Hogsback Hydro, which later became the Hogsback Inn. Hunterstoun. The private estate of David Hunter was built in 1910. Hunter was the honorary secretary and treasurer of the Lovedale Institution and the Victoria College near Alice. Forestry began in 1883 with a survey to determine the best areas for planting. The Hogsback pass was opened in 1932.

Hobbiton-on-Hogsback was started in 1946 as a holiday camp for orphans of the Second World War and, with the aid of several organisations and private donations, has grown to an outdoor education facility primarily for the benefit of underprivileged children. There was also a shop, the Handy Log Cabin, situated in the grounds of Arminel.

At the turn of the century, local farmers and townsfolk started to build holiday homes in the area as its charms became more widely known. The cottages were mostly of wattle and daub with thatched roofs. A rule was established in regard to the size of the plots, namely that each one had to be at least two Morgen.

== Geography and tourism ==
The area is known for indigenous forests, waterfalls and trout. The large gardens in the surrounding area also include exotic plants from all parts of the world, and it is a destination and tourist attraction among both international and South African tourists. Apart from 'the Hogsback', the tallest peak in the area is the 1 954 m Gaika's Kop.

=== Hiking and walking trails ===
There are a number of hiking routes and walks that take walkers through the forests, up mountains, past waterfalls and to viewing points and views of the area. General information on Hogsback such as maps of walks, hiking and mountain bike trails are available for purchase from the Hogsback Tourist Office located near the entrance of the village. These trails vary from short easy walks to trails taking 3–4 hours and longer. Hogsback hiking trails include: The Labyrinth at the Edge, The 39 Steps Falls and Arboretum, Madonna and Child Falls, Kettlespout Falls, The Three Hogs, Tyumy Pools walk, The Three Waterfall Trail, The Bluff Walk, The Military Path, The Sunset Loop, The Big Tree and The Art and Craft Trail.

=== Tolkien ===
The Amatola Forest in the Hogsback area is often claimed as J. R. R. Tolkien's inspiration for The Lord of the Rings, in particular for his fictional forest of Mirkwood. The link between Tolkien and Hogsback would seem to be a back formation from the establishment in 1947 of Hobbiton on Hogsback, a holiday and educational camp for underprivileged children. This was ten years after the publication of The Hobbit which was a huge success and which would have inspired the camp's founders as they set up in such an evocatively forested area.

=== Climate ===
Hogsback has a cool Oceanic Climate (Köppen Cfb), which compares similarly to the climate of England. It has a climate range from as low as 3.5 °C in July to as high as 34.9 °C in January. Hogsback receives an average annual precipitation of 974mm. Hogsback receives most of its rainfall in summer, often accompanied by thunderstorms.

== Location ==
Hogsback is located roughly 30 km from town of Alice. Overall, it is in the central-southern part of South Africa, in the centre of the Eastern Cape province, and is roughly halfway between the town of Alice and the village of Cathcart. Nearby towns include Seymour to the west and Alice to the south, Cathcart, Whittlesea and the Waterdown Dam to the north and Keiskammahoek to the east. However, travel east and west of the town is rare because there is little infrastructure and ridges/mountains to these sides.

== Transportation ==
The village is located on the R345, that runs from Fort Hare up to Cathcart. This is very much the only route of communication for the village because the small unpaved roads to the west and east are dangerous and not recommended for motor traversing.

== Religion ==
St Patrick's on the Hill is a small chapel consisting of two combined rondavels, a neat thatched roof, above which rises a single cross. The church also boasts a 'bright' garden, which is full of rhododendrons and azaleas. There is a stone arch with a brass bell that stands as a memorial for the Revd Dr Bride Dixon, first woman priest in South Africa, and doctor on the mountain for many years. The chapel was built in 1935 and is a regular place of worship, and although it is officially part of the Anglican Diocese of Grahamstown, the church is open to people of all Christian denominations such as Presbyterians, Methodists, Nederduits Gereformeerde Kerk (Dutch Reformed Church) and Anglicans. The chapel began when Kenneth Hobart Houghton, the owner of the property conceived of the idea to give to his wife a special place to worship. It was first designed as a single rondavel and in time as the local congregation grew, it became necessary to extend it. The second rondavel which gives it its characteristic butternut shape was added in 1992. Currently the chapel is open 24 hours a day.

== Gallery ==
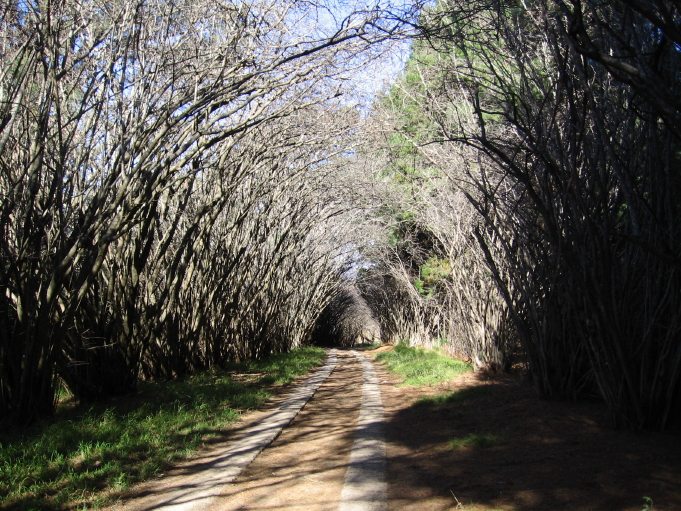
On the path to the Hogsback ecoshrine

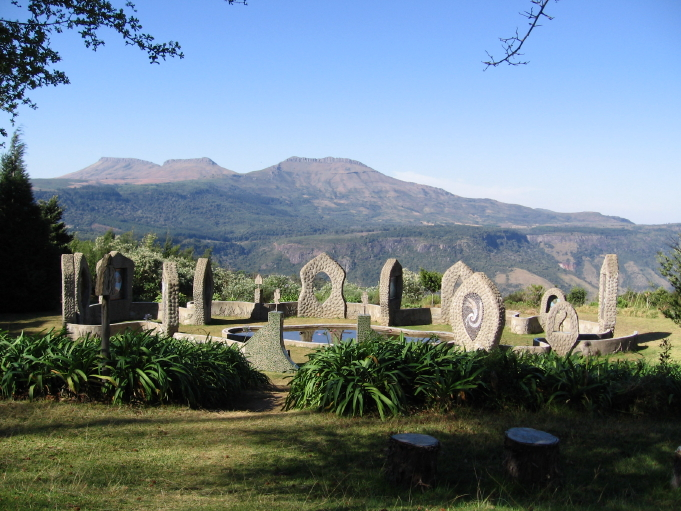
Hogsback ecoshrine

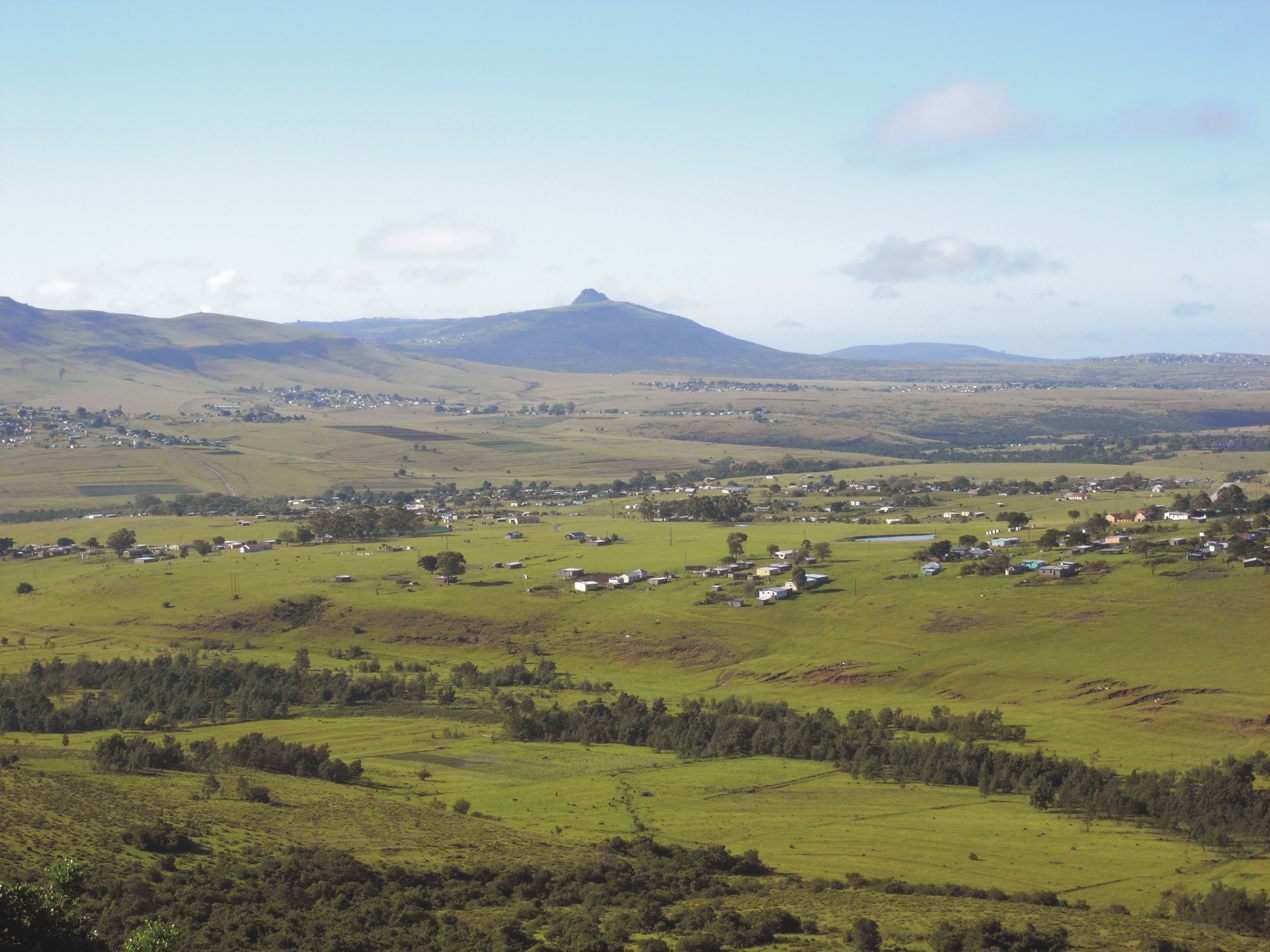
A view of Hogsback-Pass in the Tyhume valley

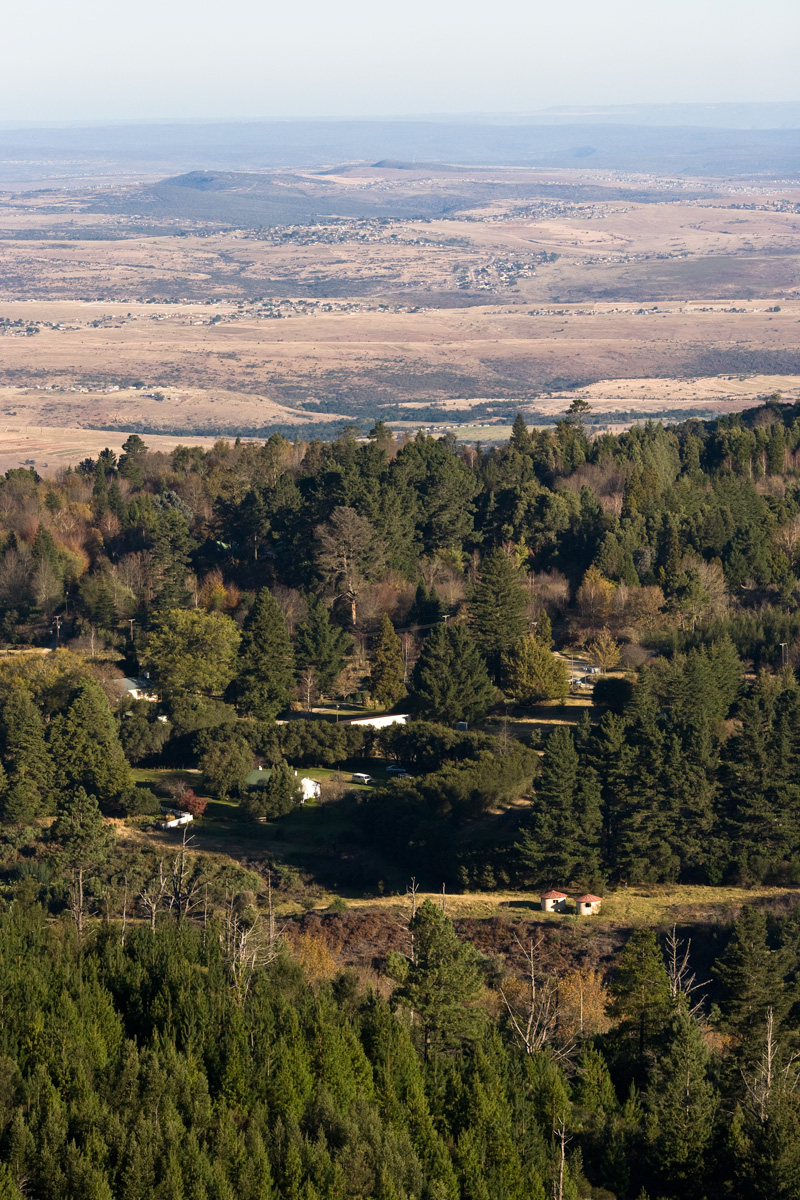
Scenery looking down from The Hog.
