= Hamburg, South Africa =

Hamburg Hamboko
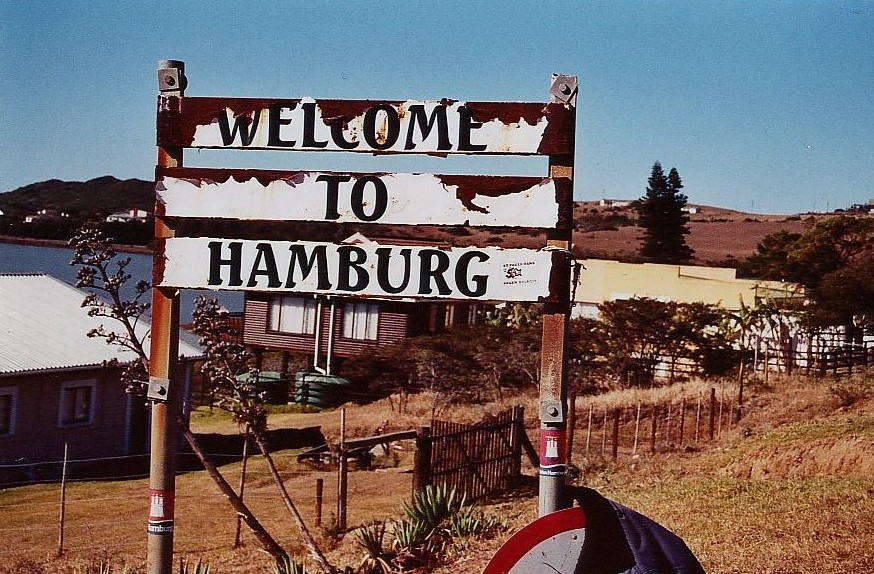
- A sign welcoming people to Hamburg.

- Location within Eastern Cape Location within South Africa Location within Africa
- Coordinates: 33.291°S 27.475°E
- Country: South Africa
- Province: Eastern Cape
- District: Amathole
- Municipality: Ngqushwa

Area
  - Total: 10.85 km^{2} (4.19 sq mi)

Population (2011)
  - Total: 1,348
  - Density: 124.2/km^{2} (321.8/sq mi)

Racial makeup (2011)
  - Black African: 95.8%
  - Coloured: 0.1%
  - Indian/Asian: 0.1%
  - White: 4.0%

First languages (2011)
  - Xhosa: 91.1%
  - English: 4.9%
  - Tsonga: 1.6%
  - Afrikaans: 1.2%
  - Other: 1.2%
- Time zone: UTC+2 (SAST)
- Postal code (street): 5641
- PO box: 5641
- Area code: 040

Hamburg is a small town with about 1000 inhabitants in the Eastern Cape province, in South Africa. It is located on the coast between the city of East London and the town of Port Alfred.

Hamburg is known as a village and holiday resort on the southern bank of the Keiskamma River, 3 km from its mouth, 11 km southeast of Peddie, 74 km south of King William's Town and 96 km south-west of East London. It was established in 1857 by members of the British-German Legion after the Crimean War and named after Hamburg in Germany.

== Cultural life ==
The Hamburg Nature Reserve is located next to the mouth of the Keiskamma River, near Hamburg.

Hamburg boasts many non-profit organisations including the Keiskamma Trust, Keiskamma Music Academy, Hamburg Hounds and Hooves, The Playground Sports & Youth Development. The Keiskamma Trust promotes health and hope through art, HIV/AIDs treatment, poverty alleviation projects and education initiatives in the village of Hamburg and its surrounding villages. The Trust sponsored the Keiskamma Tapestry, a 120-meter tapestry in the South African Parliament building depicting the history of the area. The Keiskamma Music Academy provides music education to children from Hamburg, Bell, Bodiam and Peddie. Hamburg Hounds and Hooves is a project based in Hamburg that educates local animal owners on the proper care of their animals. They actively hold clinics where sick and injured animals are treated, animals are vaccinated against diseases and animals are sterilized to prevent any further overpopulation.

== History ==
Founded by German immigrants in the 19th century, the ship carrying the immigrants came at first from Hamburg, Germany. Between 1961 and 1994 the town was part of the Bantustan of Ciskei.
