= Seymour, South Africa =

Seymour
- Location within Eastern Cape Location within South Africa
- Coordinates: 32.55°S 26.766°E
- Country: South Africa
- Province: Eastern Cape
- District: Amathole
- Municipality: Raymond Mhlaba

Area
  - Total: 2.59 km^{2} (1.00 sq mi)
- Elevation: 800 m (2,600 ft)

Population (2011)
  - Total: 2,467
  - Density: 953/km^{2} (2,470/sq mi)

Racial makeup (2011)
  - Black African: 97.8%
  - Coloured: 1.7%
  - Other: 0.5%

First languages (2011)
  - Xhosa: 95.9%
  - Afrikaans: 1.8%
  - Other: 2.3%
- Time zone: UTC+2 (SAST)
- PO box: 5750
- Area code: 040

Seymour is a town in Amatole District Municipality in the Eastern Cape province of South Africa.

The town is on the Katrivier Dam, 160 km north-west of East London and 35 km north-north-west of Alice. It was founded in 1853 and named after Colonel Charles Seymour who served as Military Secretary to the Governor, Sir George Cathcart. The town is in the Raymond Mhlaba Local Municipality.

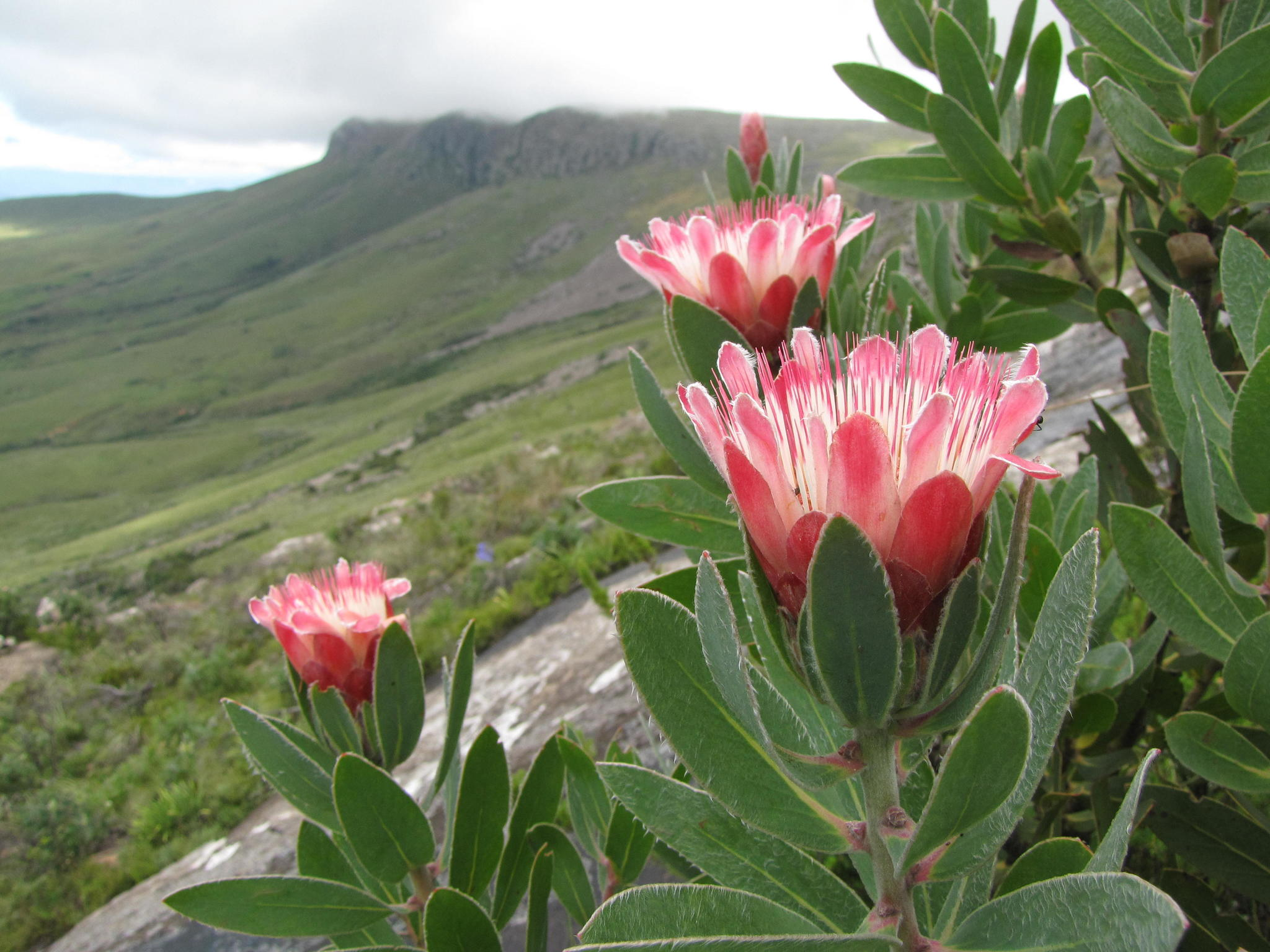
Waterlily sugarbush (Protea subvestita) in the Elandsberg, near Seymour
