= Lukhanji Local Municipality =

Coordinates: 31°54′S 26°52′E

Lukhanji
- Former local municipality
- Seal

- Location in the Eastern Cape
- Country: South Africa
- Province: Eastern Cape
- District: Chris Hani
- Seat: Queenstown
- Wards: 27

Government
  - Type: Municipal council
  - Mayor: Nozibele Makanda (ANC)

Area
  - Total: 3,813 km^{2} (1,472 sq mi)

Population (2011)
  - Total: 190,723
  - Density: 50.02/km^{2} (129.5/sq mi)

Racial makeup (2011)
  - Black African: 92.6%
  - Coloured: 3.8%
  - Indian/Asian: 0.5%
  - White: 2.7%

First languages (2011)
  - Xhosa: 86.8%
  - Afrikaans: 5.5%
  - English: 4.5%
  - Other: 3.2%
- Time zone: UTC+2 (SAST)
- Municipal code: EC134

Lukhanji Local Municipality was an administrative area in the Chris Hani District of the Eastern Cape in South Africa. Lukhanji is a Xhosa name for the mountain that runs from the eastern side of Queenstown to the western side. After municipal elections on 3 August 2016 it was merged into the larger Enoch Mgijima Local Municipality.

== Main places ==
The 2011 census divided the municipality into the following main places
(Note: only places with more than 1,000 inhabitants listed here):

Place	Census code	Area (km^{2})	Population
Angola, Lukhanji	281037	3.78	1,693
Brakkloof	281052	4.65	2,000
Embekweni	281083	4.25	1,343
Ezibeleni	281015	32.09	30,113
EZweledinga	281093	2.89	1,022
Hewu	281068	2.00	2,193
Illinge	281029	4.65	10,689
KwaNkcwa	281021	1.99	1,219
Lesseyton	281013	2.53	2,715
Lower Didimana	281050	2.39	1,288
McBride	281038	2.39	2,127
Mlungisi	281018	3.67	24,901
Mtebele	281023	3.75	1,705
New Deka	281012	1.68	1,163
Queenstown	281017	67.63	43,971
Sada	281067	4.57	13,493
Tambo	281055	4.06	3,056
Toisekraal	281011	1.02	1,467
Whittlesea	281066	15.37	14,756
Remainder of the municipality	281002	3,588.35	6,233

== Politics ==
The municipal council consisted of fifty-four members elected by mixed-member proportional representation. Twenty-seven councillors were elected by first-past-the-post voting in twenty-seven wards, while the remaining twenty-seven were chosen from party lists so that the total number of party representatives was proportional to the number of votes received. In the election of 18 May 2011 the African National Congress (ANC) won a majority of forty-five seats on the council. The following table shows the results of the election.

Party	Votes				Seats		
Party	Ward (Note: In one ward the ANC candidate was deemed elected without a ballot as no other candidates were nominated.)	List	Total	%	Ward	List	Total
ANC	38,507	39,655	78,162	82.8	26	19	45
DA	4,369	4,807	9,176	9.7	1	4	5
COPE	880	2,194	3,074	3.3	0	2	2
UDM	1,170	897	2,067	2.2	0	1	1
PAC	384	360	744	0.8	0	1	1
Pan Africanist Movement	357	151	508	0.5	0	0	0
Independent	380	–	380	0.4	0	–	0
People's Democratic Party	107	60	167	0.2	0	0	0
NFP	22	84	106	0.1	0	0	0
Total	46,176	48,208	94,384	100.0	27	27	54
Spoilt votes	927	625	1,552				
