= Teucrium africanum =

Conservation status
- Least Concern (SANBI Red List)

Scientific classification
- Kingdom: Plantae
- Clade: Tracheophytes
- Clade: Angiosperms
- Clade: Eudicots
- Clade: Asterids
- Order: Lamiales
- Family: Lamiaceae
- Genus: Teucrium
- Species: T. africanum

Binomial name
- Teucrium africanum Thunb.

Synonyms
- Ajuga africana (Thunb.) Pers.

Species of flowering plant

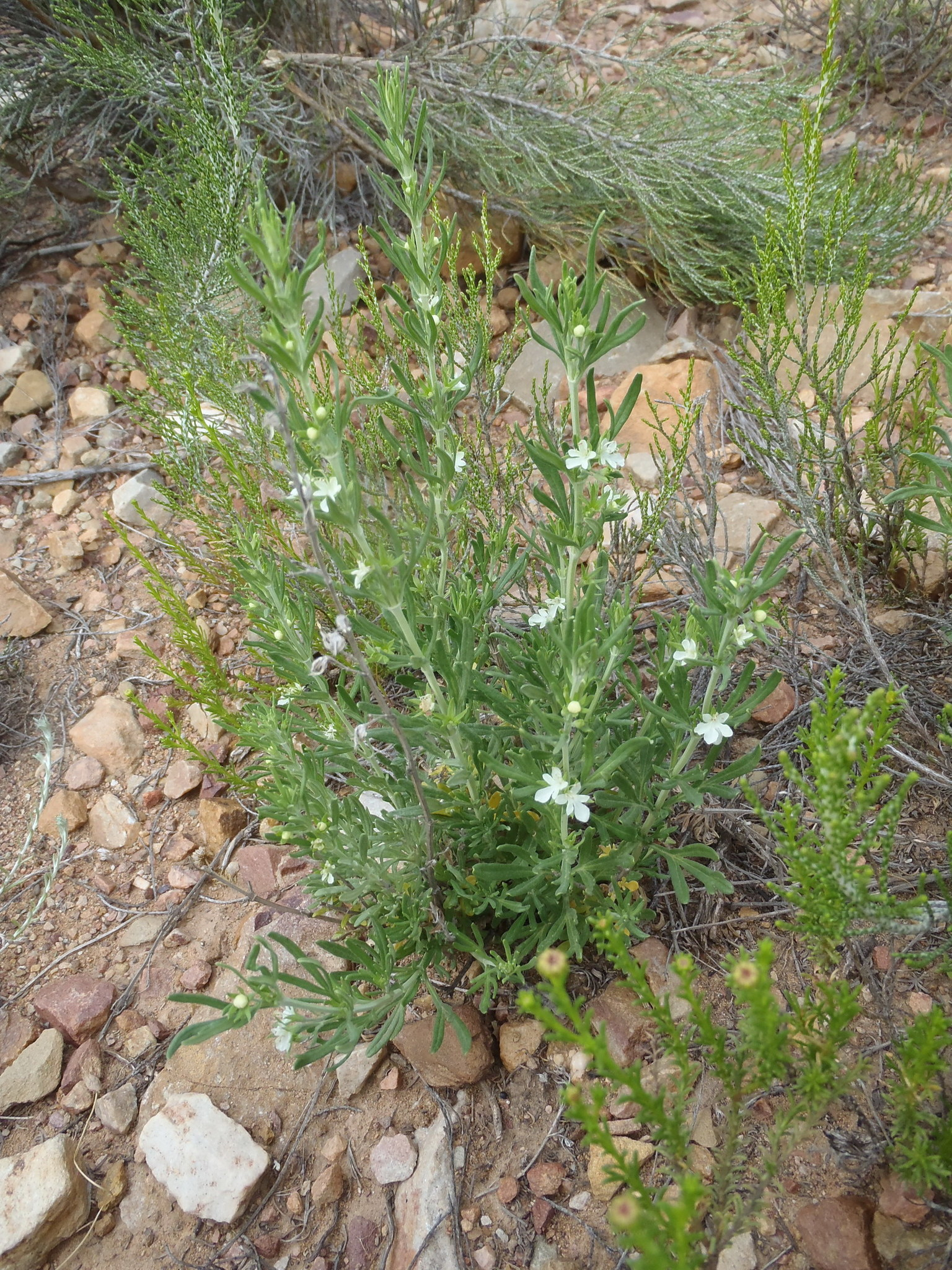
Teucrium africanum, Baviaanskloof

Teucrium africanum, commonly called the Cape or African woodsage, is a species of flowering plant in the family Lamiaceae. It is endemic to South Africa.

== Description ==
This species is a small, greyish, bushy shrublet growing 10–30 cm (3.9–11.8 in) tall. The stems are simple or branched near the base and are covered in fine, glandular hairs, giving the plant a softly felted appearance.

The leaves are sessile, grey-green, and 8–30 mm (0.31–1.18 in) long, usually divided into three narrow lobes; these lobes are linear to narrowly oblong, 5–25 mm (0.20–0.98 in) long and 1–3 mm (0.039–0.118 in) wide, with smooth, slightly rolled margins and a light covering of hairs.

The flowers are borne in a leafy, terminal panicle. They are white, with a greyish calyx 3–4 mm (0.12–0.16 in) long and a small corolla 5–6 mm (0.20–0.24 in) long. The stamens project well beyond the flower, extending by about 6–7 mm (0.24–0.28 in).

=== Identification ===
Teucrium africanum overlaps with Teucrium trifidum in the Eastern Cape, from about Makhanda to Komani. It is markedly shorter than the latter, however, and it usually has solitary flowers rather than clusters of three to seven.

== Distribution and habitat ==
This species is found in arid conditions from Bredasdorp in the Western Cape through the Klein Karoo to near Makhanda and inland to Middelburg and Graaff-Reinet.

== See also ==
- List of Lamiaceae of South Africa
