= Allan Beswick (rugby union) =

South African rugby union player (1870–1908)

- Born: Allan Menzies Beswick; 18 June 1870 Queenstown, Cape Colony
- Died: 6 September 1908 (aged 38)
- School: Queen's College Boys' High School

Rugby union career
- Position: Forward
Provincial / State sides
| Years | Team | Apps | (Points) |
| 1896 | Border | 0 | (0) |
International career
| Years | Team | Apps | (Points) |
| 1896 | South Africa | 3 | (0) |
- Correct as of 27 May 2019

Allan Beswick (30 June 1870 – 6 September 1908) was a Cape Colony international rugby union player who played as a forward.

He made 3 appearances for South Africa against the British Lions in 1896.
