= Tulbaghia galpinii =

Scientific classification
- Kingdom: Plantae
- Clade: Embryophytes
- Clade: Tracheophytes
- Clade: Spermatophytes
- Clade: Angiosperms
- Clade: Monocots
- Order: Asparagales
- Family: Amaryllidaceae
- Subfamily: Allioideae
- Genus: Tulbaghia
- Species: T. galpinii

Binomial name
- Tulbaghia galpinii Schltr.

Species of flowering plant

Tulbaghia galpinii is a geophyte belonging to the Amaryllidaceae family. The species is endemic to the Eastern Cape and has a range of 18 538 km². It is found in the high mountains of Cradock, Cathcart, Queenstown and Elliot districts.
