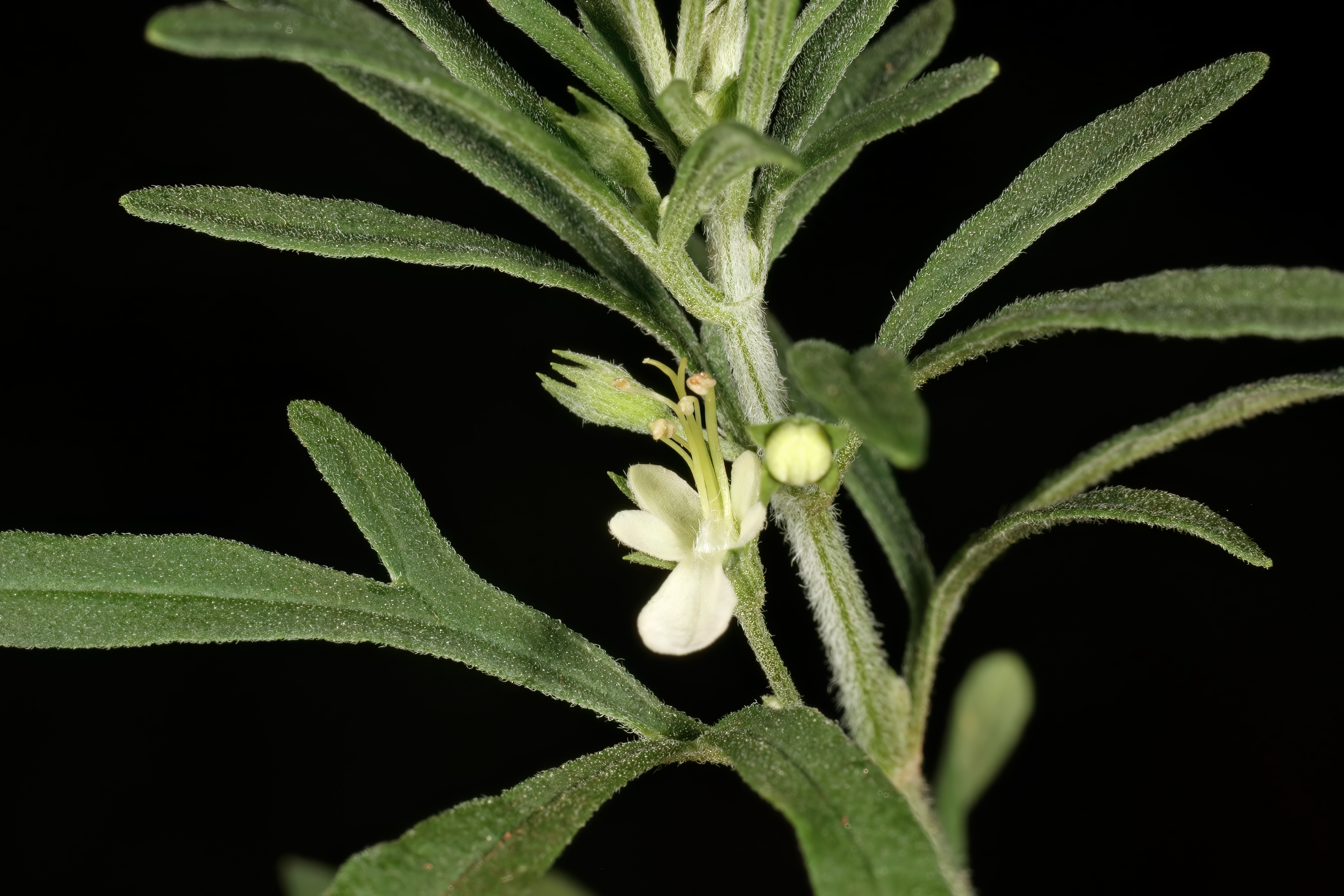

Conservation status
- Least Concern (SANBI Red List)

Scientific classification
- Kingdom: Plantae
- Clade: Tracheophytes
- Clade: Angiosperms
- Clade: Eudicots
- Clade: Asterids
- Order: Lamiales
- Family: Lamiaceae
- Genus: Teucrium
- Species: T. trifidum

Binomial name
- Teucrium trifidum Retz.

Synonyms
- Ajuga capensis (Thunb.) Pers.; Teucrium capense Thunb.

= Teucrium trifidum =

Species of flowering plant

Teucrium trifidum, commonly called the fever woodsage, is a species of flowering plant in the family Lamiaceae. It is found in South Africa, Lesotho and Botswana.

== Description ==
This species is an erect, softly woody undershrub growing 30–110 cm (0.98–3.61 ft) tall, freely branched from the base. The stems are slender and wand-like, woody near the base and herbaceous above, with a thin covering of short greyish hairs.

The leaves can be variable in shape, but they are usually deeply divided into three, or sometimes up to five, narrow lobes, and are 2–6 cm (0.79–2.36 in) long. They are thinly hairy to almost silvery; the lobes are linear to lance-shaped, 1–3.5 cm (0.39–1.38 in) long and 3–8 mm (0.12–0.31 in) wide, and may be further shallowly lobed or toothed.

The inflorescence is a leafy, branched panicle occupying the upper third of the stem, with the flowers usually borne in small clusters of three to seven on stalks 5–20 mm (0.20–0.79 in) long, typically longer than the spaces between the leaves. The calyx is 2.5–4.0 mm (0.098–0.157 in) long. The corolla is 5–6 mm (0.20–0.24 in) long and white; the lower lip is obovate and the remaining four lobes oblong to rounded. The anthers are exserted by 6–8 mm (0.24–0.31 in).

=== Identification ===
The three species of Teucrium present in South Africa all have white flowers so similar in appearance that only vegetative and inflorescence characteristics can be relied on for identification.

Teucrium trifidum overlaps with Teucrium africanum in the Eastern Cape, from about Makhanda to Komani. Teucrium trifidum is typically over 30 cm (12 in) in height and Teucrium africanum under. The latter species also usually has solitary flowers on short stalks.

Teucrium trifidum also overlaps with Teucrium kraussii in the Eastern Cape, around Komga. Its leaves are smaller and greyer than those of the latter, even if they are sometimes similarly shaped.

== Distribution and habitat ==
This species is common in South Africa′s Gauteng and North West provinces, briefly crossing into Botswana and extending down into the central Free State, Lesotho, and parts of the Northern Cape. It′s also found in eastern Mpumalanga, northern KwaZulu-Natal and the Eastern Cape as far south as Humansdorp. It typically grows in dry woodland, especially in overgrazed or disturbed places.

== See also ==
- List of Lamiaceae of South Africa
