= Rex Witte =

South African cricketer (1913–2001)

Personal information
- Born: 28 September 1913; Queenstown, South Africa
- Died: 8 October 2001 (aged 88); Johannesburg, South Africa
- Source: Cricinfo, 12 December 2020

Rex Witte (28 September 1913 – 8 October 2001) was a South African cricketer. He played in five first-class matches from 1933/34 to 1951/52.
