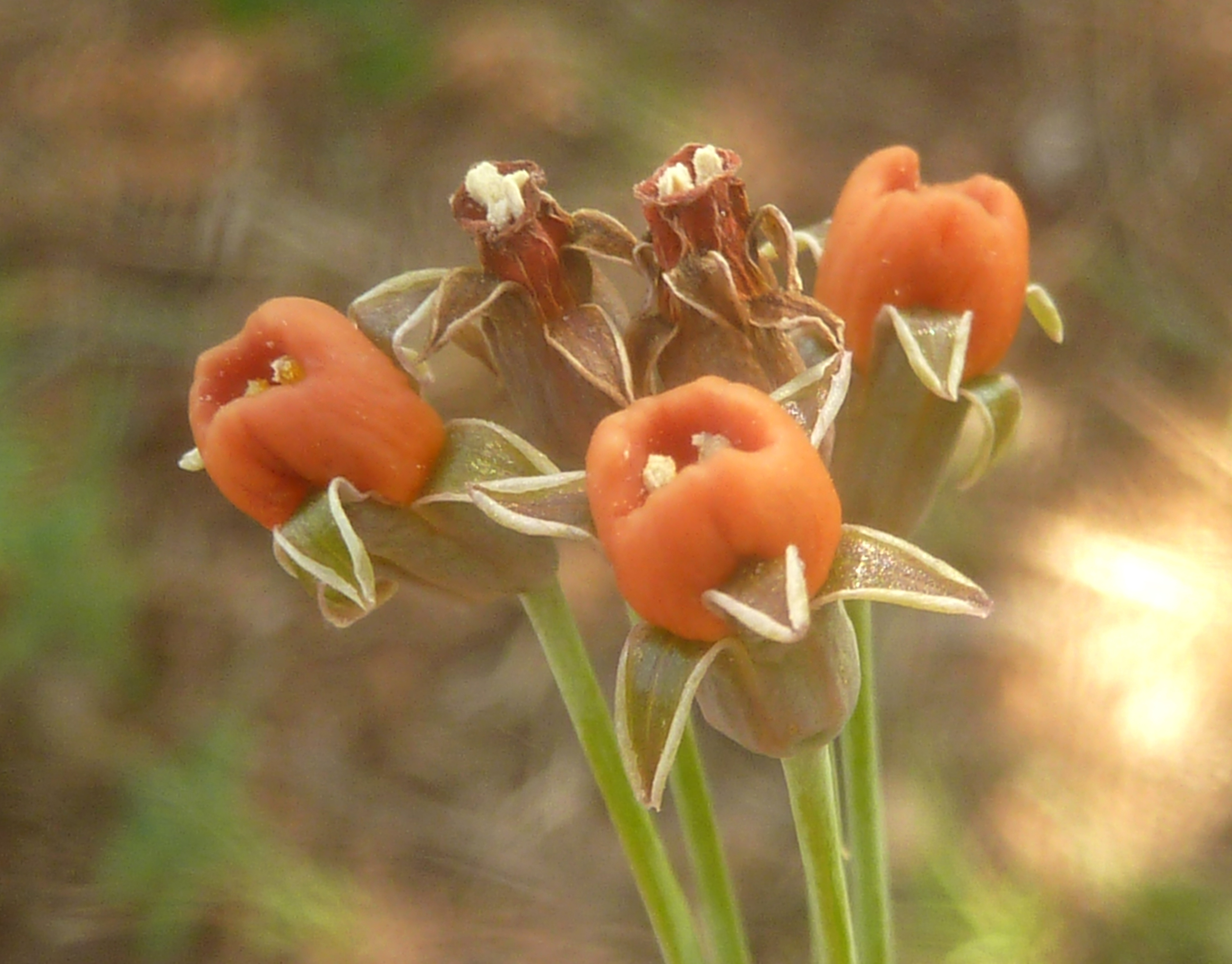

Scientific classification
- Kingdom: Plantae
- Clade: Embryophytes
- Clade: Tracheophytes
- Clade: Spermatophytes
- Clade: Angiosperms
- Clade: Monocots
- Order: Asparagales
- Family: Amaryllidaceae
- Subfamily: Allioideae
- Genus: Tulbaghia
- Species: T. acutiloba

Binomial name
- Tulbaghia acutiloba Harv.
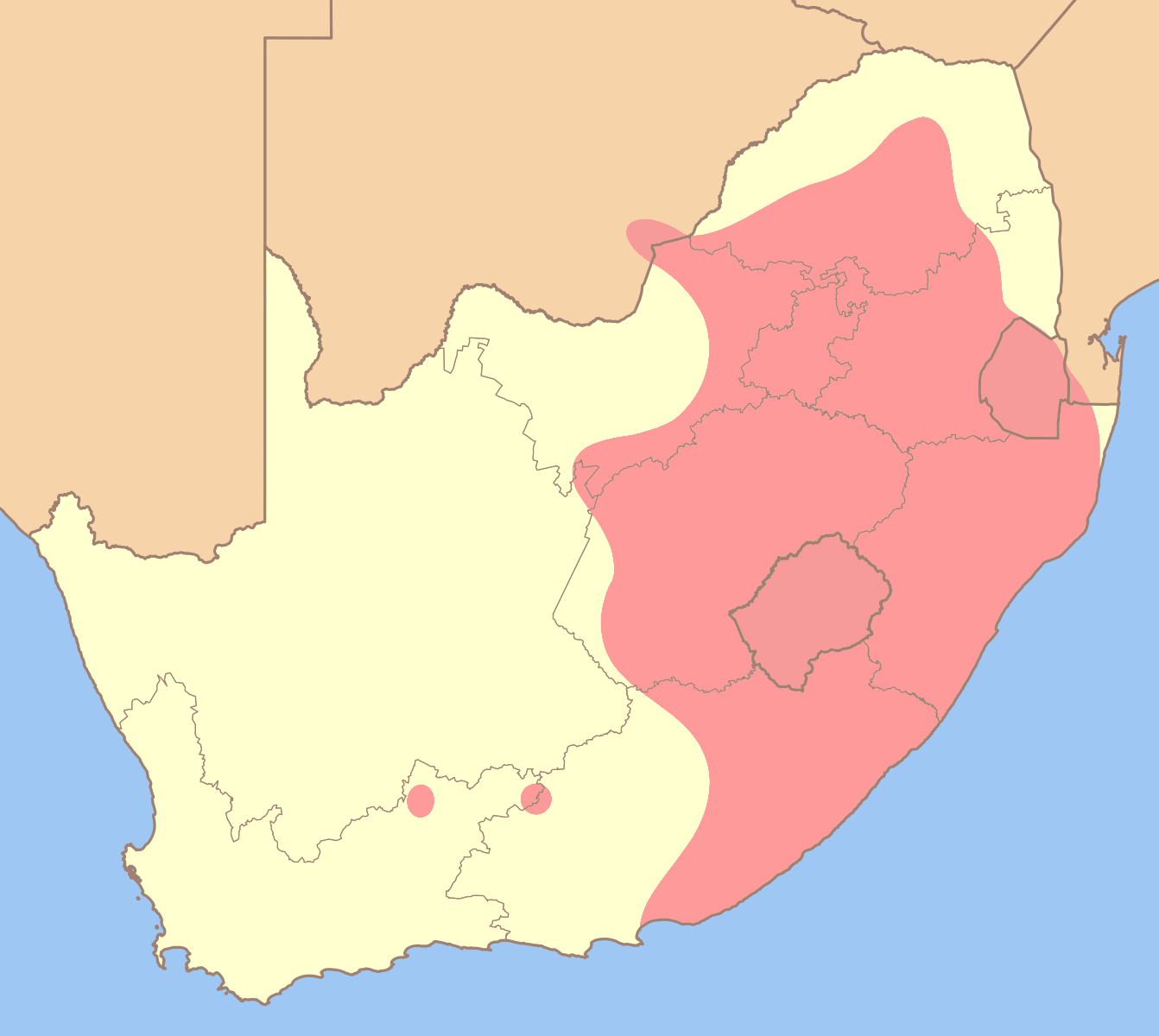
- Distribution of T. acutiloba in South Africa

Synonyms
- Omentaria acutiloba Kuntze (Harv.)

= Tulbaghia acutiloba =

Species of plant

Tulbaghia acutiloba, one of many plants named wild garlic, is a species of plant in the Allioideae subfamily of the Amaryllidaceae family. First described by William Henry Harvey in 1854, it is found in the countries of Botswana, Eswatini, Lesotho, and South Africa.

== Description ==
Tulbaghia acutiloba is one of 22 members of the genus Tulbaghia found in tropical and southern Africa. The plant is a clump-forming, bulbous perennial that ranges from 15–45 centimetres (5.9–17.7 in) in height. The leaves are narrow and grass-like, they are 50–450 millimetres (2.0–17.7 in) in length, and 3–8 millimetres (0.12–0.31 in) in width. The rhizome of the plant can grow to 3 centimetres (1.2 in) in diameter. When the plant is touched, a garlicky scent is emanated.

The flowers are small, trumpet-shaped, around 8 by 4 millimetres (0.31 in × 0.16 in) in size, and green, white, and orange-brown in colour. Khaki colored flowers are surrounded by green, recurved tepals, and a fleshy orange to reddish-brown ring, with an umbel of around 2 to 6 flowers. The flowers are sweet in scent, and the scent is particularly noticeable during the evening. The plant flowers throughout the year, mainly between the months of August to November, which is late winter to early summer in Southern Africa. The plant can flower multiple times in a single season.

== Range ==
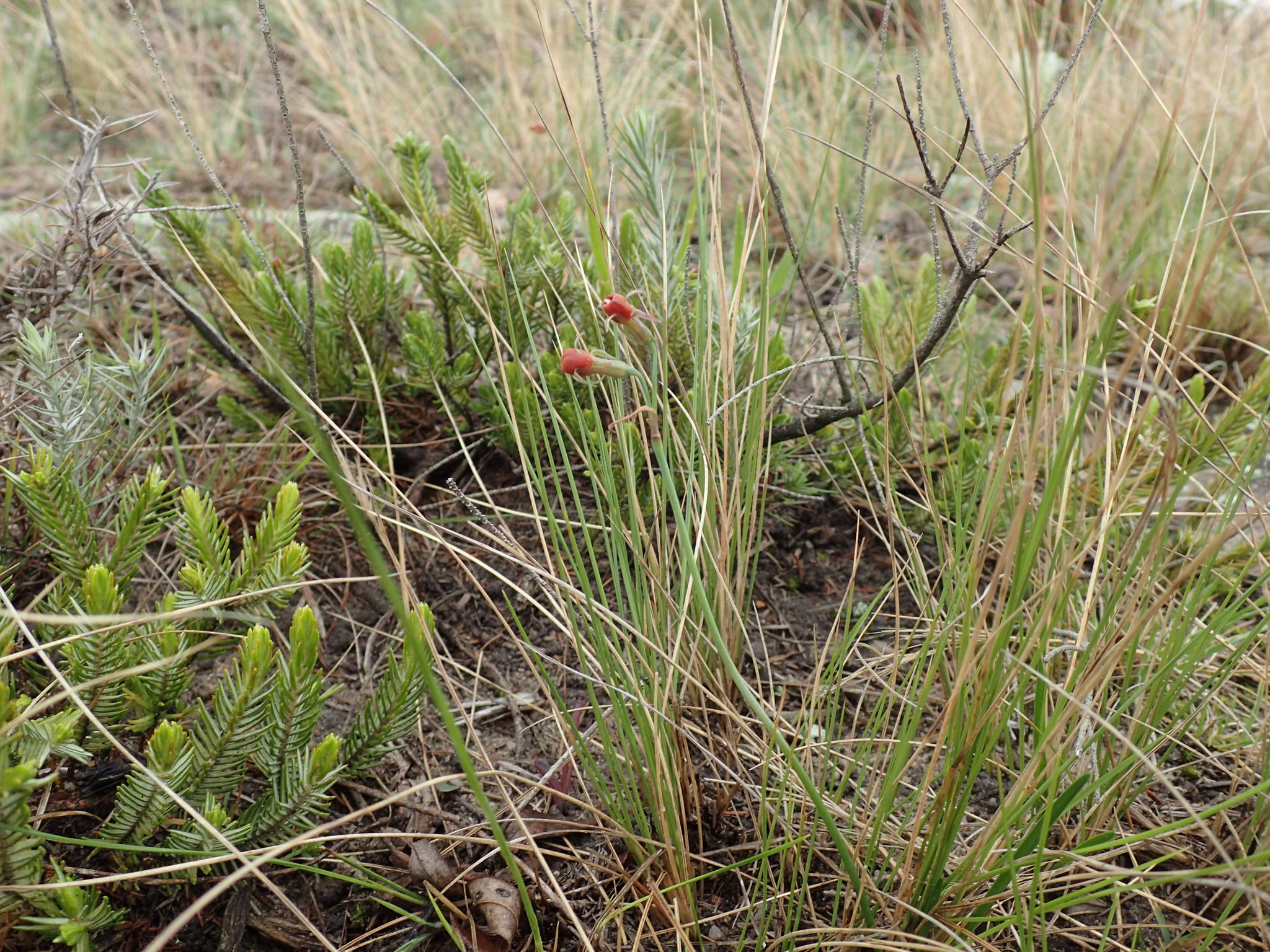
T. acutiloba in its native habitat, South Africa

Tulbaghia acutiloba is found in the countries of Botswana, Eswatini, Lesotho, and the eastern portions of South Africa. In South Africa, it is found in the provinces of Eastern Cape, Free State, Gauteng, KwaZulu-Natal, Limpopo, Mpumalanga, and North West. In Botswana, it is found in the southeastern portion of the country.

=== Habitat ===
The preferred habitat of Tulbaghia acutiloba is dry, rocky, grasslands of an elevation up to 1,800 metres (5,900 ft).

== Uses ==
The leaves of the plant are edible, and young plants are eaten as food. In the provinces of Eastern Cape and KwaZulu-Natal, it is used as a culinary herb. Traditionally, T. acutiloba was used to treat various illnesses, including infectious diseases and hypertension.

=== Conservation ===
In an assessment of South African plants in 2009 by Raimondo et al., Tulbaghia acutiloba was ranked as "Least Concern".

== Etymology ==
The generic epiphet Tulbaghia is derived from Ryk Tulbagh, the governor of the Cape of Good Hope. Tulbagh's extensive correspondences with Carl Linnaeus included sending him 200 plant specimens, among which was a specimen of Tulbaghia acutiloba sent in 1769 which led to its description. The specific epiphet acutilobus denotes the plant's "sharply pointed lobes", from the Latin acutus "acute, pointed" and lobus "lobe", which likely refers to the flower's tepals.

It is commonly known as "Wild Garlic" in the English language. It is also known locally as "Wildeknoffel" in Afrikaans, "isihihi" in the Xhosa language, "ishaladi lezinyoka" in the Zulu language, and "motsuntsunyane" or "sefothafotha" in the Southern Sotho language.

== Taxonomy ==
Tulbaghia acutiloba was first described in 1854 by William Henry Harvey. It was formerly placed in the family Alliaceae, which the APG IV system merged into the larger family Amaryllidaceae in 2016.
