= Gideon Khobane =

SuperSport TV CEO

- Born: Itumeleng Gideon Khobane; March 6, 1977 (age 49); Springs, Gauteng, South Africa
- Education: Queen's College
- Alma mater: University of South Africa
- Occupation: Businessman
- Title: CEO of SuperSport
- Spouse: Susan Younis (m. 2015)
- Children: 1
- Website: www.supersport.com

Itumeleng Gideon Khobane (born 6 March 1977) is the CEO of MultiChoice subsidiary SuperSport.

== Early life and education ==
Khobane was born in Springs, Gauteng and was educated at Queen's College where he played athletics and rugby then matriculated in 1995. He has Masters in Marketing and Management at Wits Business School and a Bachelor of Commerce in Marketing and Management at University of South Africa.

== Career ==
He was the CEO of SuperSport International from April 2016. He was previously also the director of general entertainment channels for M-Net.

== Personal life ==
In August 2014, he got engaged to Susan Younis, the Executive Producer of MTV Base Africa and founder of Ms You TV and they married on 30 October 2015. They have a son named Amani Ellie Khobane born in 2017.
