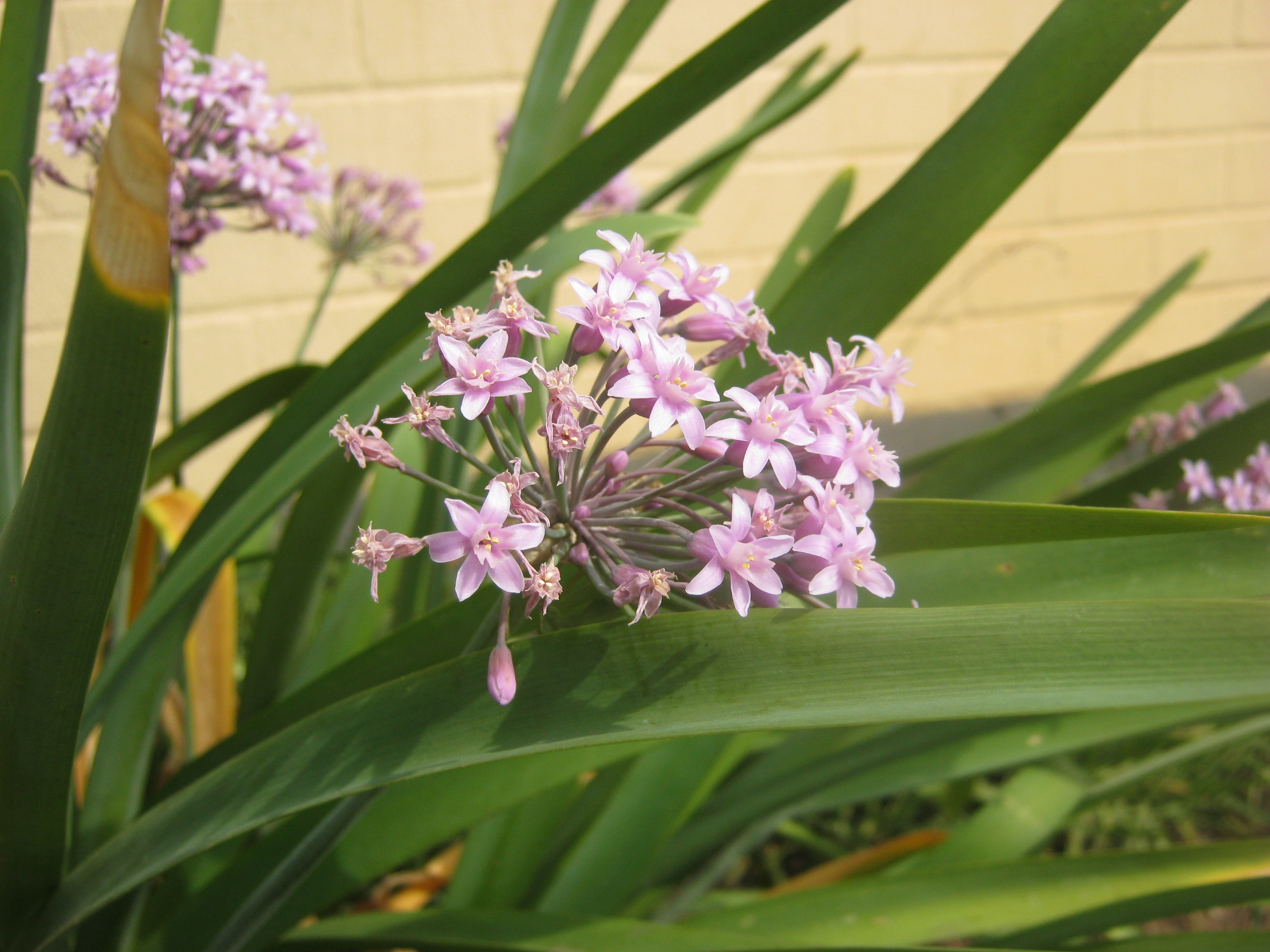
- In a garden setting
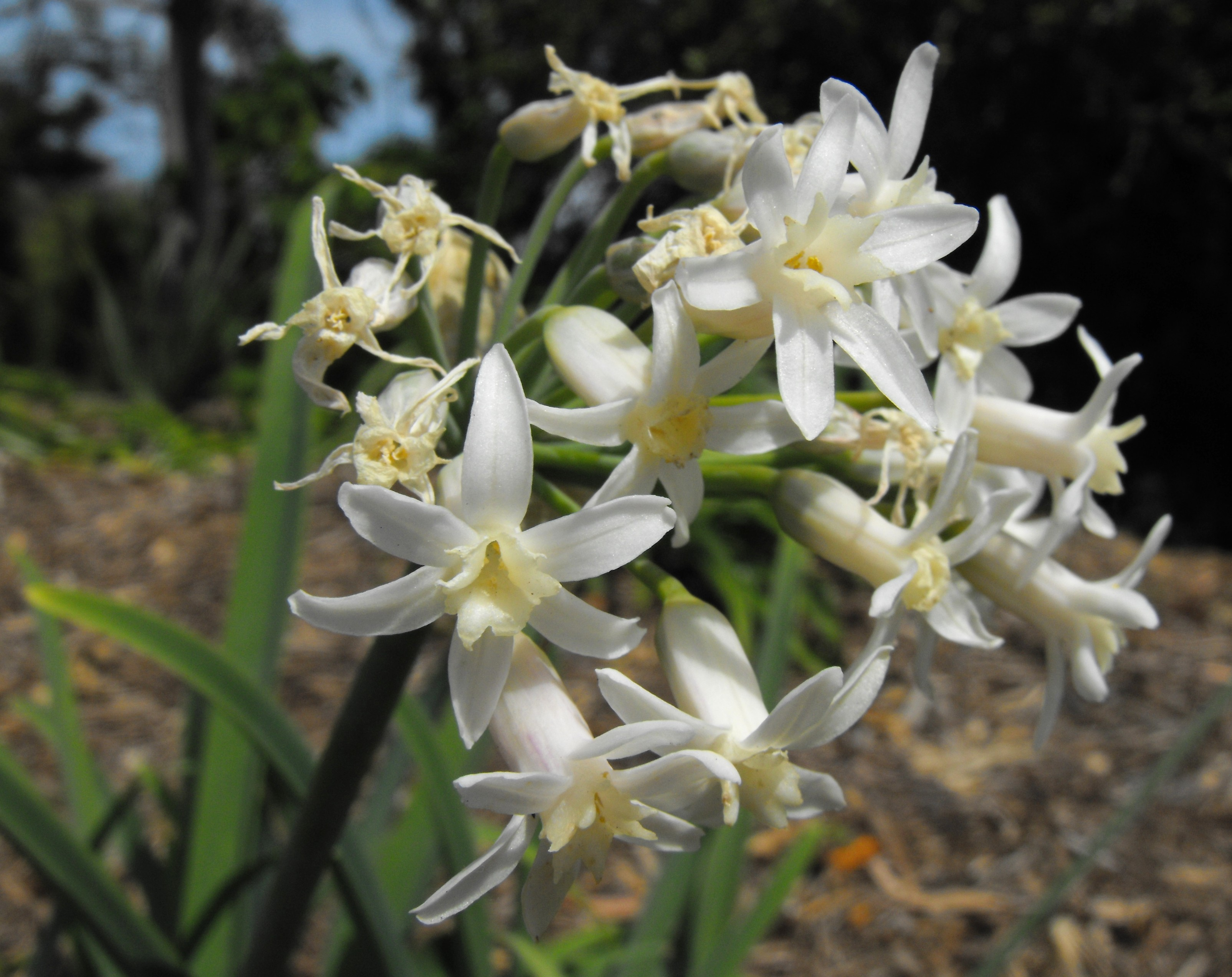
- Close-up of a white-flowered specimen

Scientific classification
- Kingdom: Plantae
- Clade: Embryophytes
- Clade: Tracheophytes
- Clade: Spermatophytes
- Clade: Angiosperms
- Clade: Monocots
- Order: Asparagales
- Family: Amaryllidaceae
- Subfamily: Allioideae
- Genus: Tulbaghia
- Species: T. simmleri

Binomial name
- Tulbaghia simmleri Beauverd

Synonyms
- Tulbaghia daviesii Grey

= Tulbaghia simmleri =

Species of flowering plant

Tulbaghia simmleri, variously called pink agapanthus, fragrant tulbaghia, and sweet wild garlic (a name it shares with Tulbaghia natalensis), is a species of flowering plant in the family Amaryllidaceae, native to the Northern Provinces of South Africa. It has gained the Royal Horticultural Society's Award of Garden Merit as an ornamental.
