= Jimmy White (rugby union) =

Rugby union player

- Born: James White; 20 May 1911 Queenstown, South Africa
- Died: 3 July 1997 (aged 86) Johannesburg, South Africa
- Height: 1.8 m (5 ft 11 in)
- Weight: 86.43 kg (191 lb)
- School: Queen's College Boys' High School

Rugby union career
Provincial / State sides
Years	Team	Apps	(Points)
1930–37	Border		
International career
Years	Team	Apps	(Points)
1931–1937	South Africa	10	(10)

James White was a rugby union player who played for the Springboks. Born in Queenstown, he was educated at Queen's College where he played for the school's 1st XV Rugby team.

== Biography ==
At the age of 20 in 1931, he was called up to play for the Springboks making him the 217th Springbok and the 2nd of his school to play for the Springboks. He played his first test match on December 5, against Wales at St. Helens, Swansea where they won the match 8–3. He played and started on all his 10 test matches and has a total of 10 points (2 tries and a drop goal). His last match for South Africa was on September 4, 1937, against New Zealand at Lancaster Park, Christchurch where they won the match 13–6.

Following his career White served in the Second World War as a member of the 6th Armoured Division.

He died on July 3, 1997, at Johannesburg aged 86.

=== Test history ===
No.	Opponents	Results (SA 1st)	Position	Points	Dates	Venue
1.	Wales	8–3	Centre		5 Dec 1931	St. Helen's, Swansea
2.	Australia	17–3	Centre		8 Jul 1933	Newlands, Cape Town
3.	Australia	6–21	Centre		22 Jul 1933	Kingsmead, Durban
4.	Australia	12–3	Centre		12 Aug 1933	Ellis Park, Johannesburg
5.	Australia	11–0	Wing	3 (1 try)	26 Aug 1933	Crusaders Ground, Port Elizabeth
6.	Australia	4–15	Fullback		2 Sep 1933	Springbok Park, Bloemfontein
7.	Australia	9–5	Centre		26 Jun 1937	Sydney Cricket Ground, Sydney
8.	Australia	26–17	Centre	3 (1 try)	17 Jul 1937	Sydney Cricket Ground, Sydney
9.	New Zealand	7–13	Centre	4 (1 drop)	14 Aug 1937	Athletic Park, Wellington
10.	New Zealand	13–6	Centre		4 Sep 1937	Lancaster Park, Christchurch

Legend: try (3 pts); pen = penalty (3 pts.); conv = conversion (2 pts.), drop = drop kick (4 pts.).

== See also ==
- List of South Africa national rugby union players – Springbok no. 217
