= Tulbaghia montana =

Scientific classification
- Kingdom: Plantae
- Clade: Embryophytes
- Clade: Tracheophytes
- Clade: Spermatophytes
- Clade: Angiosperms
- Clade: Monocots
- Order: Asparagales
- Family: Amaryllidaceae
- Subfamily: Allioideae
- Genus: Tulbaghia
- Species: T. montana

Binomial name
- Tulbaghia montana Vosa

Species of flowering plant

Tulbaghia montana is a geophyte belonging to the Amaryllidaceae family. The species is native to KwaZulu-Natal, Lesotho and the Eastern Cape.
