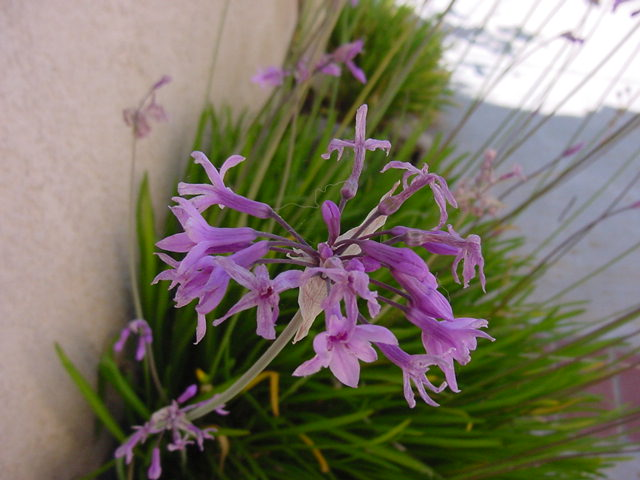
- Tulbaghia violacea

Scientific classification
- Kingdom: Plantae
- Clade: Embryophytes
- Clade: Tracheophytes
- Clade: Spermatophytes
- Clade: Angiosperms
- Clade: Monocots
- Order: Asparagales
- Family: Amaryllidaceae
- Subfamily: Allioideae
- Tribe: Tulbaghieae
- Genus: Tulbaghia; L. 1771, conserved name not Heister 1755

Synonyms
- Omentaria Salisb. (1866); Prototulbaghia Vosa (2007)

= Tulbaghia =

Society garlic

Genus of flowering plants

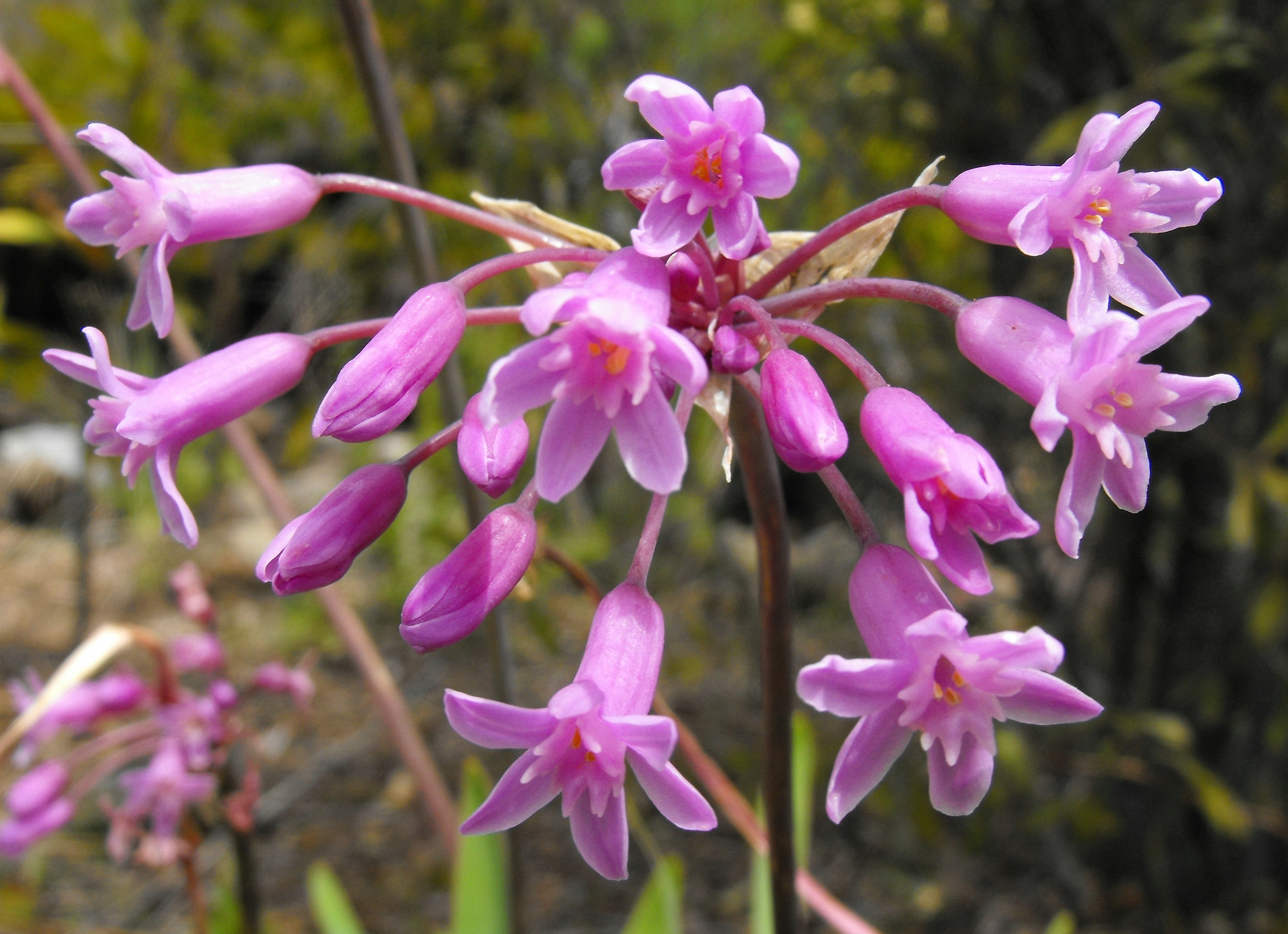
Tulbaghia simmleri

Tulbaghia (wild garlic or society garlic) is a genus of monocotyledonous herbaceous perennial bulbs native to Africa, belonging to the amaryllis family. It is the sole genus in the tribe Tulbaghieae, which in the onion subfamily. The genus was named for Ryk Tulbagh (1699–1771), one time governor of The Cape of Good Hope.

Most species are native to the Eastern Cape Province of South Africa. As is common to many members of the Allioideae, when their leaves are bruised they produce a distinct garlic smell, hence its common name. The flowers are borne in an umbel. Each flower has six narrow tepals. A characteristic of the genus is that there is a "corona" – a raised crown-like structure – at the centre of the flower. This may be small and scale-like or may be larger, somewhat like the trumpet of a small narcissus.

== Species ==
28 species are accepted.

- Tulbaghia acutiloba Harv. – Botswana, Lesotho, Eswatini, South Africa
- Tulbaghia aequinoctialis Welw. ex Baker – Angola
- Tulbaghia alliacea L.f., syn. Tulbaghia affinis – Botswana, Zimbabwe, Zambia, South Africa
- Tulbaghia calcarea Engl. & Krause – Namibia
- Tulbaghia cameronii Baker – Cameroon, Zaire, Tanzania, Malawi, Mozambique, Zambia, Zimbabwe, Namibia
- Tulbaghia capensis L. – Cape Province
- Tulbaghia cernua Fisch., C.A.Mey. & Avé-Lall. – Botswana, Lesotho, South Africa
- Tulbaghia coddii Vosa & R.B.Burb. – Mpumalanga
- Tulbaghia cominsii Vosa – Cape Province
- Tulbaghia dregeana Kunth – Cape Province
- Tulbaghia friesii Suess. – Nyanga Mountains of Mozambique + Zimbabwe
- Tulbaghia galpinii Schltr. – Cape Province
- Tulbaghia leucantha Baker – Botswana, Lesotho, Eswatini, South Africa, Zambia, Zimbabwe, Namibia
- Tulbaghia ludwigiana Harv. – Eswatini, South Africa
- Tulbaghia luebbertiana Engl. & Krause – Namibia
- Tulbaghia macrocarpa Vosa – Zimbabwe
- Tulbaghia maritima Vosa – Cape Province
- Tulbaghia montana Vosa – Cape Province
- Tulbaghia natalensis Baker – Cape Province, KwaZulu-Natal
- Tulbaghia nutans Vosa – Mpumalanga
- Tulbaghia pretoriensis Vosa & Condy – Gauteng
- Tulbaghia rhodesica R.E.Fr. – Tanzania, Zambia
- Tulbaghia simmleri Beauverd – Northern Province
- Tulbaghia tenuior K.Krause & Dinter – Cape Province, Namibia
- Tulbaghia transvaalensis Vosa – Limpopo, KwaZulu-Natal
- Tulbaghia verdoornia Vosa & R.B.Burb. – Cape Province
- Tulbaghia violacea Harv. – Society garlic – Cape Province, KwaZulu-Natal; naturalized in Tanzania + Mexico

formerly included

A few names have been coined using the name Tulbaghia, but applied to species now considered better suited to the genus Agapanthus.

- Tulbaghia africana – Agapanthus africanus
- Tulbaghia heisteri – Agapanthus africanus
- Tulbaghia minor – Agapanthus africanus
- Tulbaghia praecox – Agapanthus praecox
