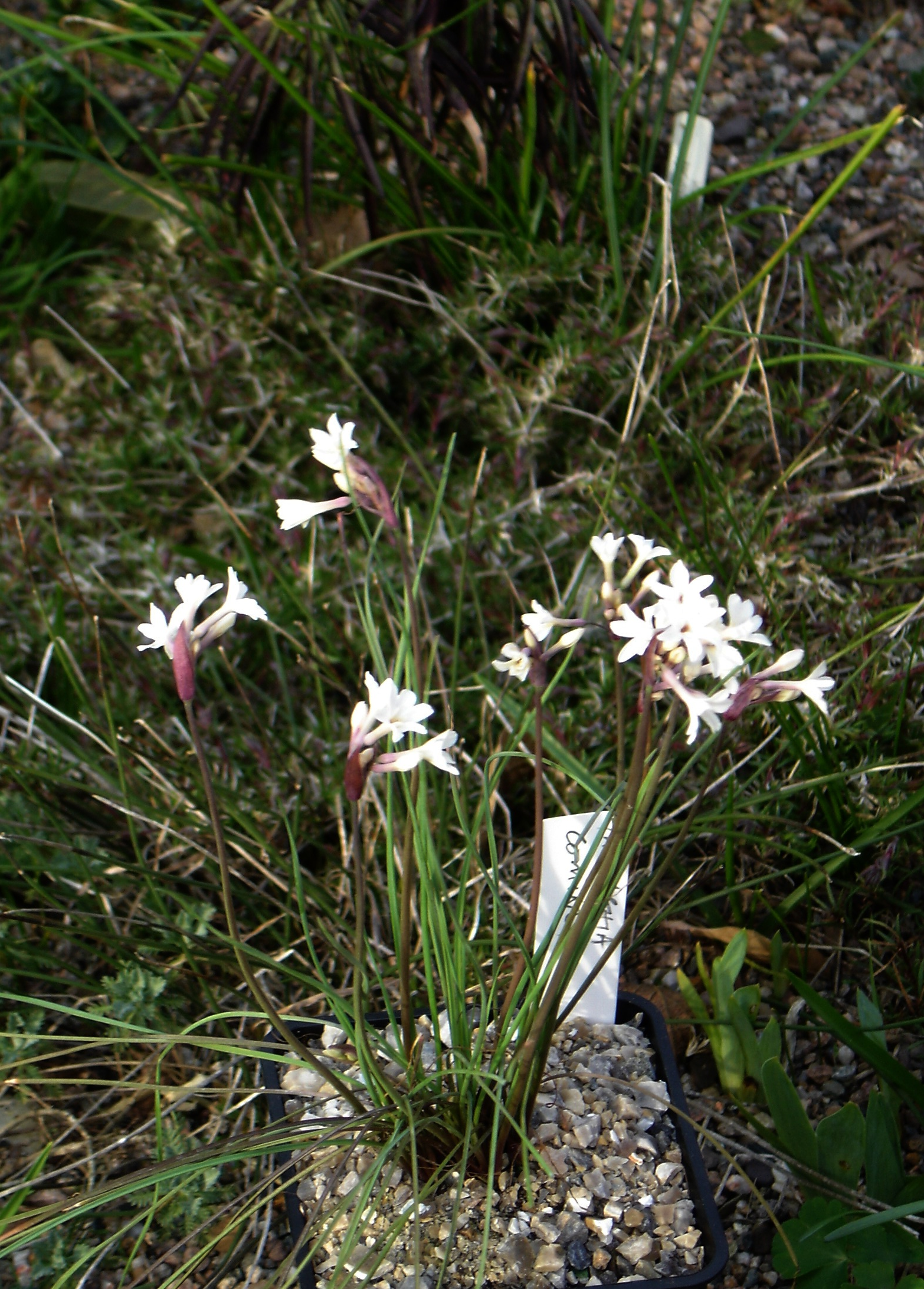

Scientific classification
- Kingdom: Plantae
- Clade: Embryophytes
- Clade: Tracheophytes
- Clade: Spermatophytes
- Clade: Angiosperms
- Clade: Monocots
- Order: Asparagales
- Family: Amaryllidaceae
- Subfamily: Allioideae
- Genus: Tulbaghia
- Species: T. cominsii

Binomial name
- Tulbaghia cominsii Vosa

= Tulbaghia cominsii =

Species of flowering plant

Tulbaghia cominsii was a geophyte belonging to the Amaryllidaceae family. The species was endemic to the Eastern Cape and appeared in King William's Town. It had a range of only 7 km^{2} but is now extinct due to a road construction project.
