= Janse van der Ryst =

South African cricketer and educator (born 1967)

Personal information
- Born: 24 January 1967 (age 59); Mossel Bay, Cape Province, South Africa
- Source: Cricinfo, 1 December 2020

Janse van der Ryst (born 24 January 1967) is an educator and former cricketer from South Africa. He played in one List A and two first-class matches for Boland in 1991/92.

He is the current headmaster of Queen's College Boys' High School and a former deputy headmaster of Jeppe High School for Boys.

== See also ==
- List of Boland representative cricketers
