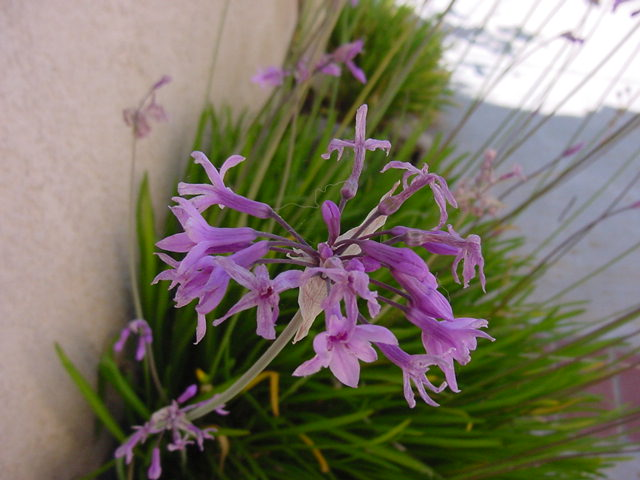

Scientific classification
- Kingdom: Plantae
- Clade: Tracheophytes
- Clade: Angiosperms
- Clade: Monocots
- Order: Asparagales
- Family: Amaryllidaceae
- Subfamily: Allioideae
- Genus: Tulbaghia
- Species: T. violacea

Binomial name
- Tulbaghia violacea Harv.

Synonyms
- Omentaria violacea (Harv.) Kuntze

= Tulbaghia violacea =

Species of flowering plant

Tulbaghia violacea, commonly known as society garlic, pink agapanthus, wild garlic, sweet garlic, spring bulbs, or spring flowers, is a species of flowering plant in the family Amaryllidaceae. It is indigenous to southern Africa (KwaZulu-Natal and Cape Province), and reportedly naturalized in Tanzania and Mexico.

Growing to 60 cm (24 in) tall by 25 cm (10 in) wide, it is a clump-forming perennial with narrow leaves and large clusters of fragrant, violet flowers from midsummer to autumn (fall).

== Description and cultivation ==
When grown as an ornamental, this plant requires some protection from winter frosts. This species and the cultivars 'Purple Eye' and 'Silver Lace', with cream-margined leaves, have all gained the Royal Horticultural Society's Award of Garden Merit.

Treatment of seeds with a smoke solution has been shown to increase the leaf mass and height of T. violacea seedlings. Seeds exposed to aerosol smoke was also shown to lead to a higher seedling survival percentage.

=== Odour ===
While the smell of T. violacea is typically described as garlic like, there has been an instance where police were called about the smell of cannabis in a neighborhood only to find out that the culprit was actually a combination of lemon verbena and society garlic.

== Uses ==
=== Culinary uses ===
T. violacea leaves are eaten as a substitute for chives and garlic. In South Africa, Zulu people eat the leaves and flowers as a leaf vegetable like spinach or for seasoning meat and potatoes.

=== Medicinal uses ===
Tulbaghia violacea is used locally as a herbal remedy/medicine to treat several ailments.

Due to increasing evidence of its potential as an antifungal agent, large-scale commercialization is anticipated. However, this may make the Tulbaghia genus threatened as it is susceptible to overuse.

=== Safety and toxicity ===
Some fatalities and symptoms like gastro-enteritis, abdominal pain, cessation of gastro-intestinal peristalsis, sloughing of the intestinal mucosa, and contraction of the pupils, have been implicated in medication prepared with T. violacea. There has been speculation that T. violacea may cause poisonings but tests on rabbit showed no negative effects. It is possible that reported adverse effects are due to extensive use and/or high dosages of the plant. Adverse effects are generally assumed to be associated with the steroidal saponins and/or the sulphur compounds.

Ncube et al. (2011) found that the leaves and flowers of the plant are edible as vegetables. Elgorashi et al. (2003) used the Ames and VITOTOX tests and found that these parts (leaves and flowers) are non-toxic.

== Gallery ==
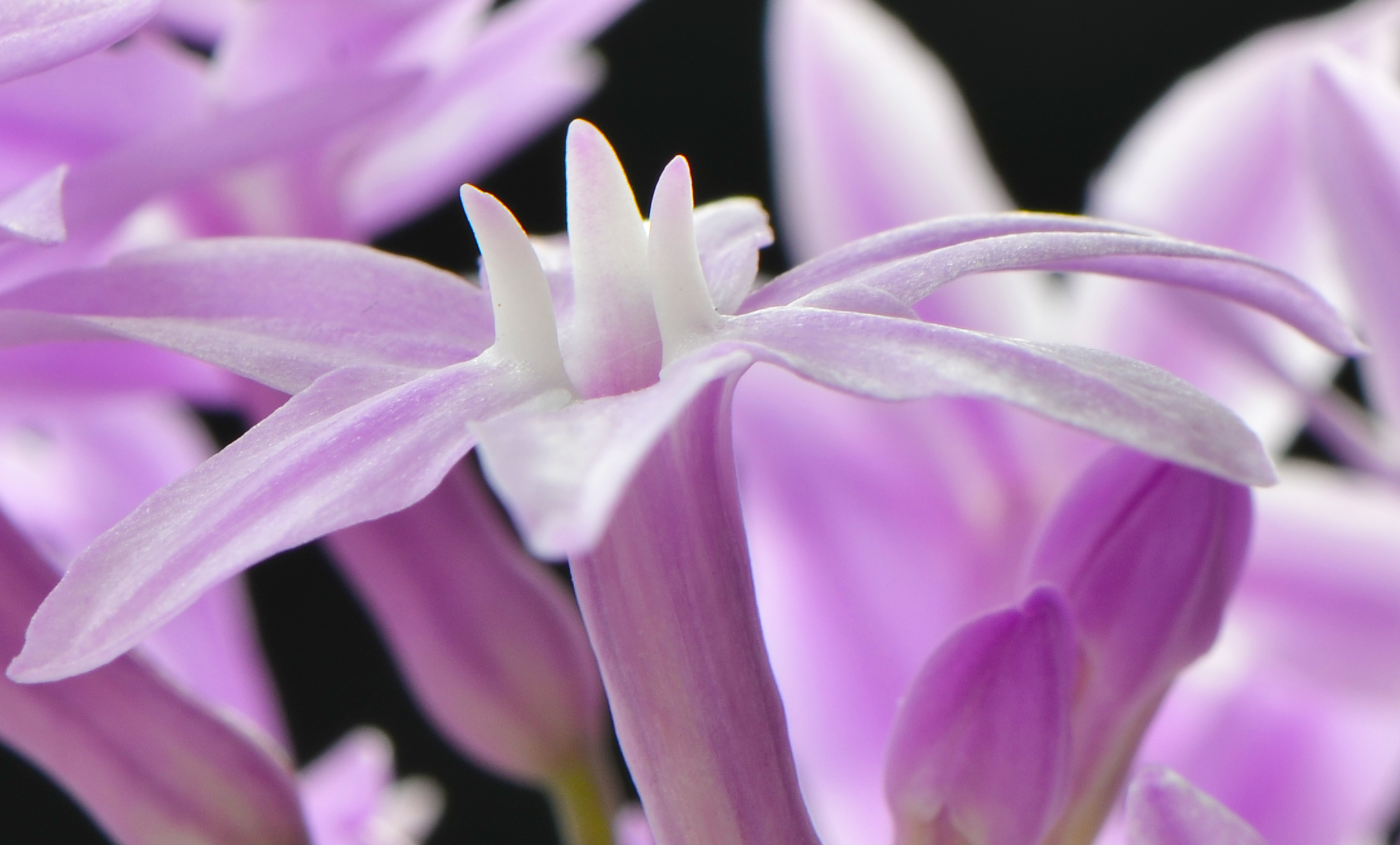
Flowers closeup

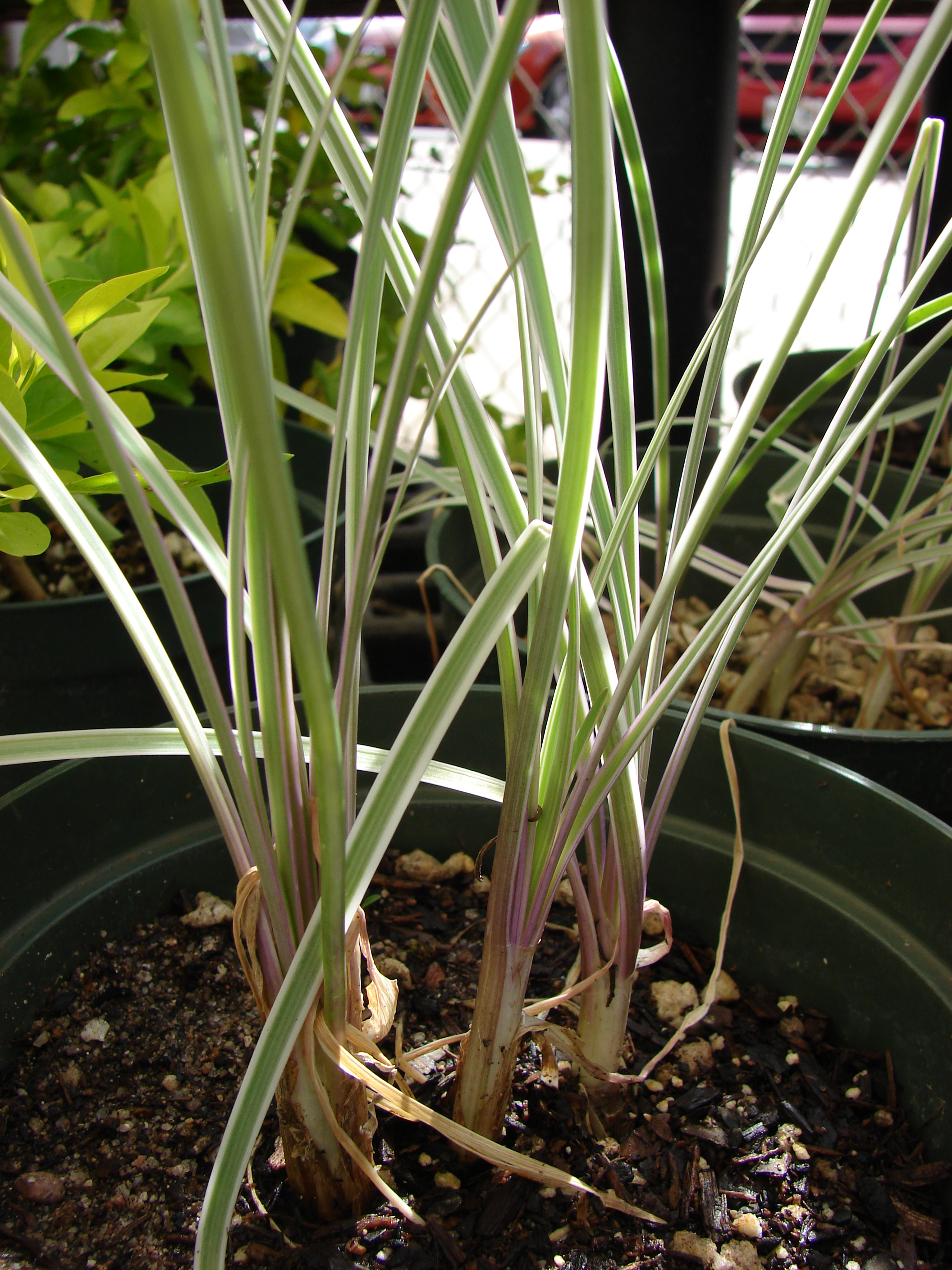
For sale in Hawaii

At Hortus Botanicus, Amsterdam
