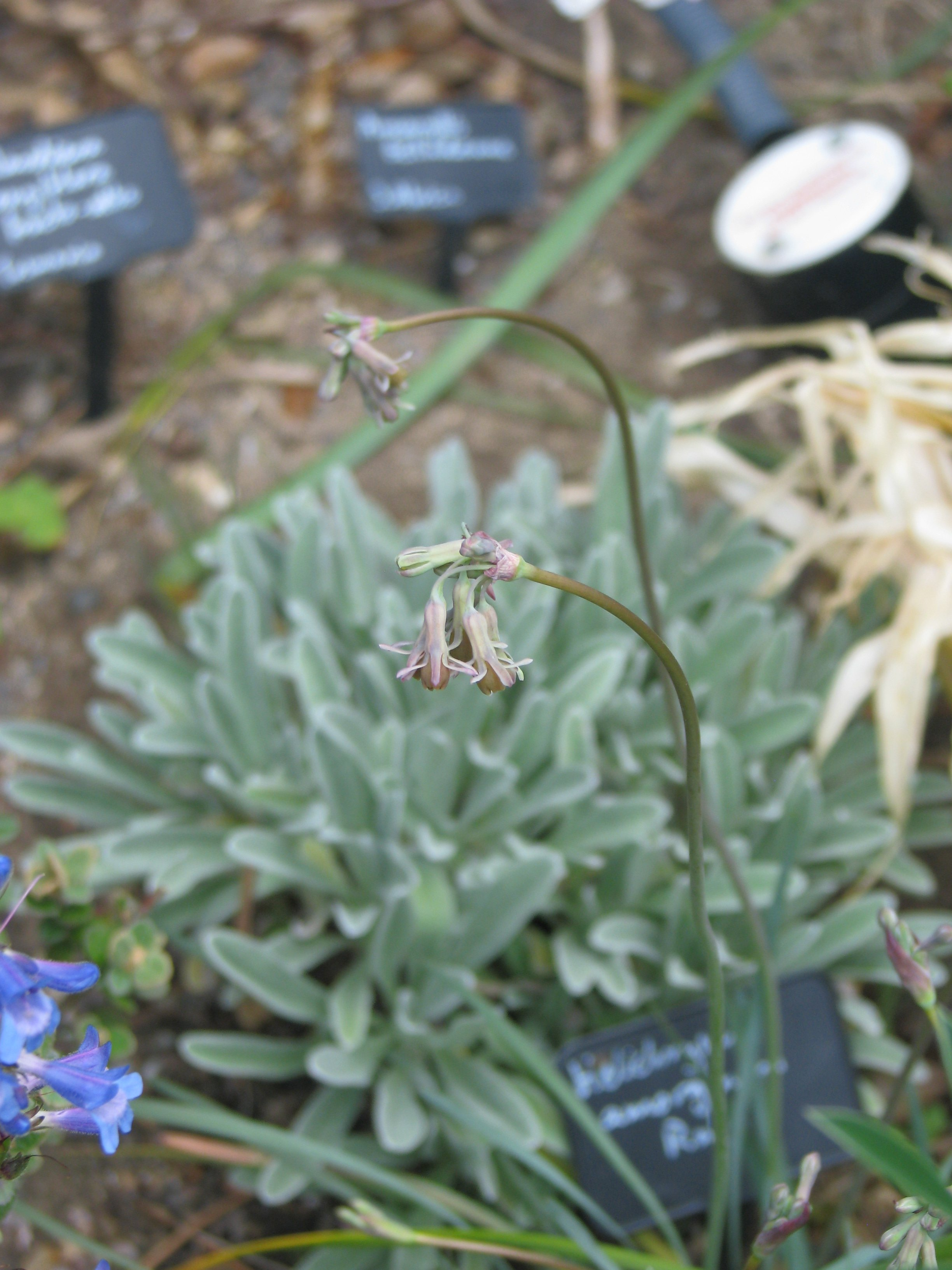

Scientific classification
- Kingdom: Plantae
- Clade: Embryophytes
- Clade: Tracheophytes
- Clade: Spermatophytes
- Clade: Angiosperms
- Clade: Monocots
- Order: Asparagales
- Family: Amaryllidaceae
- Subfamily: Allioideae
- Genus: Tulbaghia
- Species: T. verdoornia

Binomial name
- Tulbaghia verdoornia Vosa & R.B.Burb.

Synonyms
- Tulbaghia carnosa R.B.Burb.

= Tulbaghia verdoornia =

Species of flowering plant

Tulbaghia verdoornia is a geophyte belonging to the Amaryllidaceae family. The species is endemic to the Eastern Cape.
