= Tulbaghia aequinoctialis =

Scientific classification
- Kingdom: Plantae
- Clade: Embryophytes
- Clade: Tracheophytes
- Clade: Spermatophytes
- Clade: Angiosperms
- Clade: Monocots
- Order: Asparagales
- Family: Amaryllidaceae
- Subfamily: Allioideae
- Genus: Tulbaghia
- Species: T. aequinoctialis

Binomial name
- Tulbaghia aequinoctialis Welw. ex Baker

Synonyms
- Omentaria aequinoctialis (Welw. ex Baker) Kuntze

Species of plant

Tulbaghia aequinoctialis is a plant in the family Amaryllidaceae native to Angola. It was first described to science in 1878.
