= Tulbaghia cameronii =

Scientific classification
- Kingdom: Plantae
- Clade: Embryophytes
- Clade: Tracheophytes
- Clade: Spermatophytes
- Clade: Angiosperms
- Clade: Monocots
- Order: Asparagales
- Family: Amaryllidaceae
- Subfamily: Allioideae
- Genus: Tulbaghia
- Species: T. cameronii

Binomial name
- Tulbaghia cameronii Baker

Species of flowering

Tulbaghia cameronii is a species of wild garlic in the family Amaryllidaceae.

== Distribution ==
It is found in tropical east Africa, notably Cameroon, Tanzania, the Congo, Zambia, Malawi, Mozambique, and Zimbabwe, in woodland and woodland grassland on sandy soils and at an elevation of 1000–1500 m.

== Description ==
Tulbaghia cameronii is a perennial plant that grows to 45 cm in height, with a rootstock diameter of between 1.5 and 2.5 cm. Leaf-bases are reddish brown in colour, and 12.5–37 cm long, linear-lanceolate. The bracts are small and pinkish, up to 3 cm in length.

Perianths of T. cameronii are greenish white to purple, the tube 5–8 mm. The seeds of this plant are sub-crescent shaped, and between 3 and 3.5 mm long.

== Edibility ==
Flowers and leaves of T. cameronii are sometimes harvested in the wild, and are somewhat edibile when cooked. It is eaten as a side dish mixed with other ingredients. It has no known medical uses.
