= Tulbaghia natalensis =

Scientific classification
- Kingdom: Plantae
- Clade: Embryophytes
- Clade: Tracheophytes
- Clade: Spermatophytes
- Clade: Angiosperms
- Clade: Monocots
- Order: Asparagales
- Family: Amaryllidaceae
- Subfamily: Allioideae
- Genus: Tulbaghia
- Species: T. natalensis

Binomial name
- Tulbaghia natalensis Baker

Species of flowering plant

Tulbaghia natalensis, called pink wild garlic and sweet wild garlic (a name it shares with Tulbaghia simmleri), is a species of flowering plant in the family Amaryllidaceae, native to the Cape Provinces and KwaZulu-Natal in South Africa. It has gained the Royal Horticultural Society's Award of Garden Merit as an ornamental.
