= Frederick York St Leger =

South African newspaper founder

- Born: 20 March 1833; Limerick, Ireland
- Died: 28 March 1901 (aged 68); Newlands, Cape Town
- Education: St Paul's School, London
- Alma mater: Corpus Christi College, Cambridge
- Occupation: Editor
- Years active: 1876-1895
- Employer: Cape Times
- Successor: Edmund Garrett
- Children: 8, Stratford Edward St Leger

Frederick York St Leger was the Irish founder of the Cape Times newspaper in South Africa, and an Anglican priest.

== Early life and family ==
He was born into an Anglo-Irish family in Limerick, Ireland, on 20 March 1833.

He married Christiana Emma Mudelle of Maidstone, Kent, England, in 1856, and they moved to South Africa, where they went on to have eight children, their eldest being Frederick Luke St Leger (1857 - 1938), another son Colonel Stratford Edward St Leger (1867-1935) was a member of the Royal Irish Regiment. His great-granddaughter was the artist and poet Joan St Leger Lindbergh.

== Career ==
The Revd. F.Y. St. Leger served as headmaster at St. Andrew's College, Grahamstown, Eastern Cape, South Africa, from 1859 to 1862.

In 1873 and 74, he was an editor and journalist for the Diamond Field newspaper of Griqualand West.

In 1875, he was elected to the Legislative Assembly of the Parliament of the Cape of Good Hope, as one of the representatives for Cape Town.

He founded and edited the first issue of the Cape Times on 27 March 1876.

St. Leger died at Newlands, Cape Town, on 28 March 1901.

== Notes and references ==
- Shaw, Gerald (1975). Some Beginnings: The Cape Times (1876 - 1910). Oxford University. ISBN 0-19-570071-6.
- Laurie, K. W. J. (1914). Register of S. Andrew's College, Grahamstown, from 1855 to 1914. Grahamstown: Slater & Co.
- Langham-Carter, R.R. (June 1981). "Stratford Edward St. Leger: An artist of the South African War of 1899-1902". Military History Journal. 5 (3). South African Military History Society.

=== Further reading ===
- Hilton-Barber, David (2014). The Saint, the Surgeon and the Unsung Botanist: A tribute to my remarkable ancestors. Footprints Press. ISBN 978-0-620-61401-6.
- Shaw, Gerald (1999). The Cape Times: An Informal History. David Philip Publishers. ISBN 0-86486-404-3.
