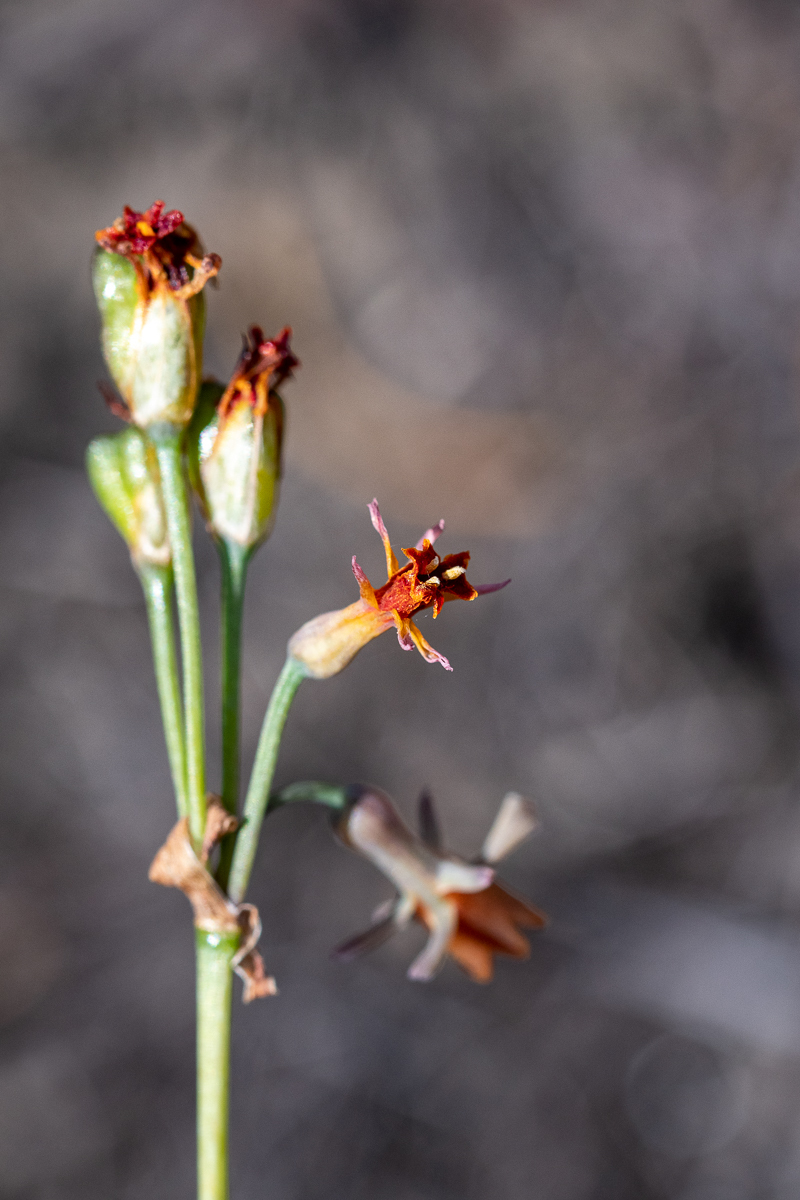

Scientific classification
- Kingdom: Plantae
- Clade: Embryophytes
- Clade: Tracheophytes
- Clade: Spermatophytes
- Clade: Angiosperms
- Clade: Monocots
- Order: Asparagales
- Family: Amaryllidaceae
- Subfamily: Allioideae
- Genus: Tulbaghia
- Species: T. alliacea

Binomial name
- Tulbaghia alliacea L.f.

Synonyms
- Omentaria alliacea (L.f.) Kuntze; Tulbaghia affinis Link; Tulbaghia brachystemma Kunth; Tulbaghia inodora Gaertn.; Tulbaghia narcissifolia Salisb.

= Tulbaghia alliacea =

Species of flowering plant

Tulbaghia alliacea is a geophyte belonging to the Amaryllidaceae family. The species is native to Botswana, South Africa, Zambia and Zimbabwe.
