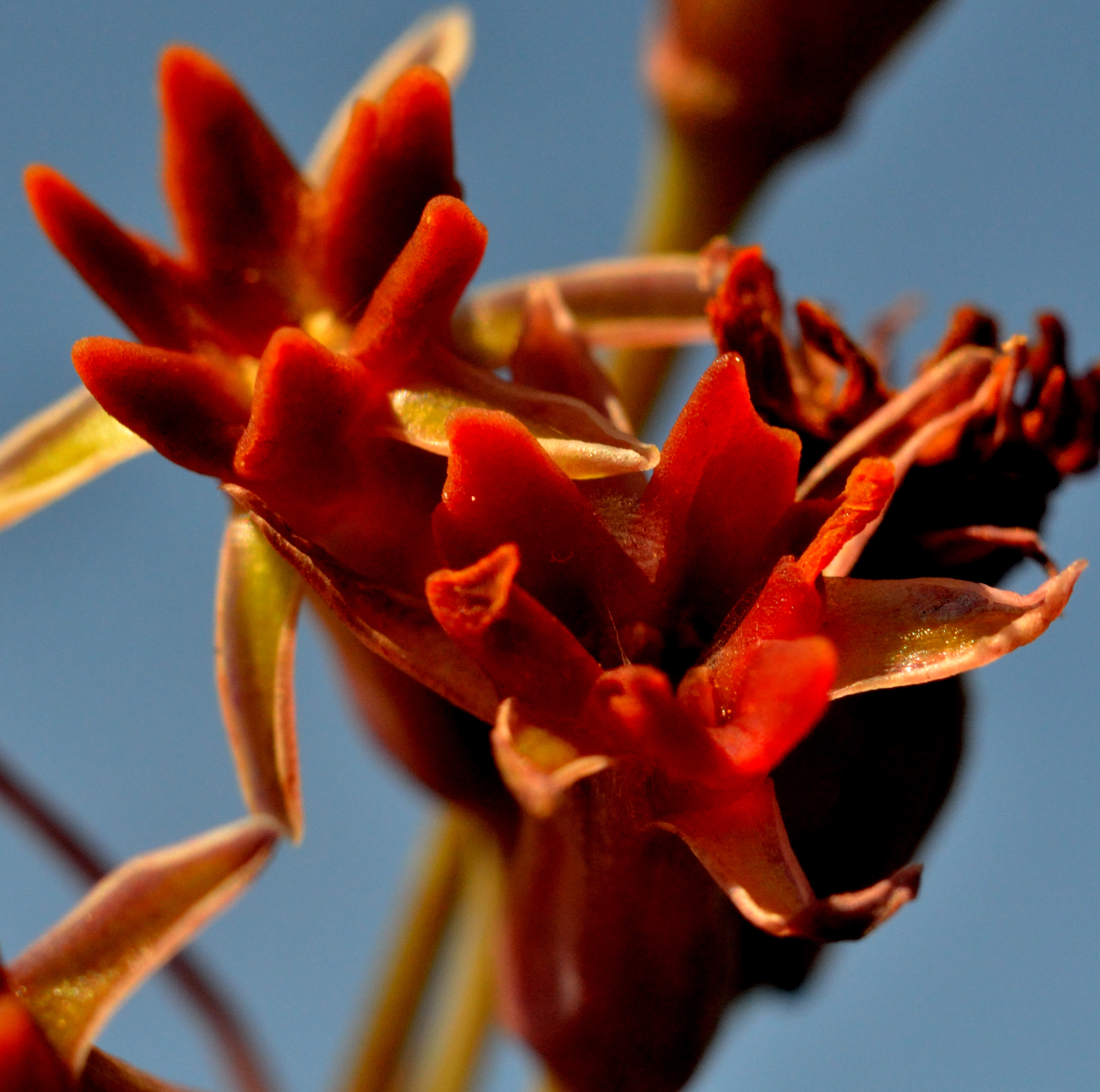

Scientific classification
- Kingdom: Plantae
- Clade: Embryophytes
- Clade: Tracheophytes
- Clade: Spermatophytes
- Clade: Angiosperms
- Clade: Monocots
- Order: Asparagales
- Family: Amaryllidaceae
- Subfamily: Allioideae
- Genus: Tulbaghia
- Species: T. capensis

Binomial name
- Tulbaghia capensis L.

Synonyms
- Omentaria capensis (L.) Kuntze; Omentaria cepacea Salisb.; Tulbaghia cepacea L.f.; Tulbaghia pulchella Avé-Lall.

= Tulbaghia capensis =

Species of flowering plant

Tulbaghia capensis is a geophyte belonging to the Amaryllidaceae family. The species is endemic to the Eastern Cape and the Western Cape.
