= Tulbaghia friesii =

Conservation status
- Least Concern (IUCN 3.1)

Scientific classification
- Kingdom: Plantae
- Clade: Embryophytes
- Clade: Tracheophytes
- Clade: Spermatophytes
- Clade: Angiosperms
- Clade: Monocots
- Order: Asparagales
- Family: Amaryllidaceae
- Subfamily: Allioideae
- Genus: Tulbaghia
- Species: T. friesii

Binomial name
- Tulbaghia friesii Suess.

Synonyms
- Tulbaghia rhodesica Weim.

Species of flowering plant

Tulbaghia friesii is a geophyte belonging to the Amaryllidaceae family. The species is native to Mozambique and Zimbabwe where it occurs in the Nyanga Mountains.
