= Tulbaghia luebbertiana =

Scientific classification
- Kingdom: Plantae
- Clade: Embryophytes
- Clade: Tracheophytes
- Clade: Spermatophytes
- Clade: Angiosperms
- Clade: Monocots
- Order: Asparagales
- Family: Amaryllidaceae
- Subfamily: Allioideae
- Genus: Tulbaghia
- Species: T. luebbertiana

Binomial name
- Tulbaghia luebbertiana Engl. & Krause

Species of flowering plant

Tulbaghia luebbertiana is a geophyte belonging to the Amaryllidaceae family. The species is endemic to Namibia.
