= Tulbaghia cernua =

Scientific classification
- Kingdom: Plantae
- Clade: Embryophytes
- Clade: Tracheophytes
- Clade: Spermatophytes
- Clade: Angiosperms
- Clade: Monocots
- Order: Asparagales
- Family: Amaryllidaceae
- Subfamily: Allioideae
- Genus: Tulbaghia
- Species: T. cernua

Binomial name
- Tulbaghia cernua Fisch., C.A.Mey. & Avé-Lall.

Synonyms
- Tulbaghia campanulata N.E.Br.

Species of flowering plant

Tulbaghia cernua is a geophyte belonging to the Amaryllidaceae family. The species is native to Botswana, Lesotho and South Africa.
