= Queen's College Boys' High School =

South African public school for boys

Location
- 16 Berry Street, Top Town; Komani, Eastern Cape; South Africa; 31.8898°S 26.8765°E

Information
- Former names: Prospect House Academy, Public School for Boys, Queenstown Grammar School
- School type: All-boys public school
- Motto: Esse Quam Videri (To be, rather than to seem)
- Established: 21 April 1858; 168 years ago
- Founder: Mr. C.E. Ham
- Status: Government subsidised, fee paying public school
- Sister school: Queenstown Girls' High School
- School district: Chris Hani West District
- Oversight: School Governing Body
- Chairman: Allister Van Schoor
- QCOBA National President: Lungisa Tshele
- Headmaster: Janse van der Ryst (1 January 2018 - present)
- Staff: 50 full-time
- Grades: 8–12
- Gender: Male
- Enrollment: 600 boys
- Language: English (main language); Xhosa, Afrikaans & Sesotho (additional languages)
- Schedule: Monday - Friday; 07:30 - 13:30
- Campus type: Suburban
- Houses: Beswick [Boarders] Mallet [Day Boys] Russell [Day Boys]
- Colours: Black; Old Gold; White
- Song: The College Song & Queen's Forever
- Fight song: Ingonyama (War Cry)
- Sports: Athletics; Basketball; Cricket; Cross country Football; Hockey; Rugby; Squash; Tennis; Golf; Swimming
- Mascot: Kudu
- Nickname: QC, Queen's
- Rivals: Dale College; Selborne College; Grey High School
- Accreditation: Eastern Cape Department of Education
- Newspaper: Queen's Quote
- Yearbook: The Queen's Quire
- Affiliations: International Boys' School Coalition, Queenstown Education Foundation, Four Schools One Family
- Website: www.queenscollege.co.za

Queen's College Boys' High School, more commonly referred to as Queen's College (or simply QC), is a public English medium high school for boys situated in the town of Komani in the Eastern Cape province of South Africa. Established in 1858 first as Prospect House Academy, it is the oldest school in the Border region and among the 100 oldest schools in South Africa. The college is associated with Queen's College Boys' Primary School, which was established on 15 November 1957, a year before the high school marked 100 years of existence.

== History ==
Queen's College started as Prospect House Academy when Mr C.E Ham first opened the doors to his school on 21 April 1858 at 6 Shepstone Street in Queenstown. The school was situated in an outbuilding on the property and consisted of a single room with a mud floor and holes in the wall for ventilation. The enrollment had reached 30 boys by 1859 and was also known as the Queenstown District School. It was in receipt of a government grant of £50, backdated to the initial opening of the school. From inception the school offered boarding facilities, in the home of Mr Ham, conveniently situated directly across the road from the schoolhouse.

In 1864, a dispute regarding financial support for the school by the district council, led to the abrupt closure of the school by Mr Ham and he ceased teaching in order to open a general store in the town. Boys returning from their holiday in July 1864 discovered that their school house had been let to another tenant and their schoolmaster had become a haberdasher. Public concern was such that a committee was formed, which decides that St Michael's Grammar School should assume the mantle of Prospect House Academy by accepting the status of a government-aided school. The resulting amalgamated school becomes the Public School for Boys and classes are held in a billiard hall.

It was only in 1910 that the school was renamed Queen's College.

== Headmasters ==
- Mr. CE Ham (1858–1864)
- Mr. G Elliot (1864–1865)
- Mr. R McCormick (1865–1867)
- Mr. FJ Beswick (1867–1899)
- Mr. B Noaks (1899–1900)
- Mr. GFH Clark (1901–1904)
- Mr. H Wilkinson (1904–1929)
- Mr. A Parry-Davies (1930–1939)
- Dr. HQ Davies (1940–1964)
- Mr. TW Higgs (1965–1973)
- Mr. DH Schroeder (1974–1992)
- Mr. CP Harker (1993–2010)
- Mr. DCP Lovatt (2011–2012)
- Mr. BJ Grant (2013–2017)
- Mr. J van der Ryst (2018–present)

== Hostels ==
The school currently has four hostels; Whitson House, Athlone House, Connaught House and De Vos House. Whitson caters for students in Grade 8, De Vos for students in Grade 9, Connaught for students in Grades 10–12 and Athlone for students in Grade 10. Athlone was reopened in 2021 after many years of closure. De Vos was similarly reopened in 2026 due to the recent uptick in boarders, after many years of closure. All hostel boys belong to Beswick House, a name taken from the school's fourth headmaster.

Originally, Whitson House was the first hostel of the school and was built in 1904. It was later renamed Connaught House. In 1932, this hostel was closed leading to the later opening of hostels Athlone and De Vos Malan in 1939. In 1975, Connaught House was renamed Whitson House after old boy Mr H Whitson. The new Connaught House was built in 1979. After a decline in boarders in the early 2000s most of the hostels were closed and converted into classrooms. Hostels outside campus were sold.

== Sports ==
Queen's College has a long-standing tradition of annual derby days for both summer and winter sports with traditional rivals such as Dale College, Grey High School, St. Andrew's College, and Selborne College, dating back to at least the 1900s. Grey College was also a significant rival, but the yearly derby between these two rugby giants lost momentum, with 1996 marking the last of the annual clashes.

Queen's College is one of only two schools in South Africa equipped with an 8-lane tartan track. Completed in early 2024, the track meets the criteria to host national athletics events, and Queen's is set to host the National Junior Athletics Championships in 2025.

The main sports fields include the Queen's College Victoria Recreation Grounds, used for rugby and athletics; the Chris Harker Astro, where first team hockey matches are played; and the Parry-Davies Field, home to the first cricket team matches as well as rugby games. While the Chris Harker Astro is named after the school, it is a shared facility with Queenstown Girls' High School and Balmoral Girls' Primary School.

== Notable Old Boys ==
=== Sport ===
==== Rugby and Cricket ====
Rugby Players
Name & Surname	Year Matriculated	Teams	Notes
Allan Beswick	1888	49th Springbok	
Jimmy White	1928	217th Springbok	
Dick Muir	1982	642nd Springbok	
Robbi Kempson	1992	669th Springbok	
Kaya Malotana	1994	687th Springbok	
Owen Lentz	1998	American Rugby	
Carlo del Fava	1998	Italian Rugby	
Rocco Jansen	2004	Emerging Springboks Rugby	
Lionel Cronjé	2007	South Africa U20 (2009 Player of the Year), South Africa 'A'	Sharks Rugby player (2022–present)
S'bura Sithole	2008	South Africa Sevens	
Allan Dell	2010	South Africa U20, Scottish Rugby, British and Irish Lion #834	
Andisa Ntsila	2011	South Africa 'A'	
Johan Meyer	2011	Italian Rugby	
Juan-Philip Smith	2012	South Africa U20, USA Rugby	

Cricket Players
Name & Surname	Year Matriculated	Teams	Notes
Ken McEwan	1970	Eastern Province and Essex cricketer	
Daryll John Cullinan	1984	South African Test Cricketer	
Justin Kemp	1996	South African Test and limited overs Cricketer	
Tony Greig	1965	English Test Cricketer	
Ian Greig	1974	English Test Cricketer	

==== Other sports ====
- Glen Dell, Advanced World Aerobatic Champion in 2004 and Red Bull Air Race competitor (1974)
- Le-Neal Jackson, South African field hockey player

=== Business and the arts ===
- Allister Sparks, journalist, author and former editor of The Rand Daily Mail (1950)
- Alan Scholefield, journalist and writer (1947)
- Don Pinnock, criminologist, naturalist and journalist (1965)
- Gideon Khobane, CEO of SuperSport (1995)

=== Military ===
- John ("Jack") Sherwood Kelly, VC CMG DSO, recipient of the Victoria Cross (also attended Dale College, Selborne College and St. Andrews College)
- Norman Walsh, Rhodesian and Zimbabwean air marshal (1949)
