= Tulbaghia leucantha =

Scientific classification
- Kingdom: Plantae
- Clade: Embryophytes
- Clade: Tracheophytes
- Clade: Spermatophytes
- Clade: Angiosperms
- Clade: Monocots
- Order: Asparagales
- Family: Amaryllidaceae
- Subfamily: Allioideae
- Genus: Tulbaghia
- Species: T. leucantha

Binomial name
- Tulbaghia leucantha Baker

Synonyms
- Tulbaghia dieterlenii E.Phillips

Species of flowering plant

Tulbaghia leucantha, the mountain wild garlic, is a species of flowering plant in the family Amaryllidaceae, widely distributed in southern Africa. It has gained the Royal Horticultural Society's Award of Garden Merit as an ornamental.
