= Stratford Edward St Leger =

Stratford Edward St Leger CMG CVO DSO
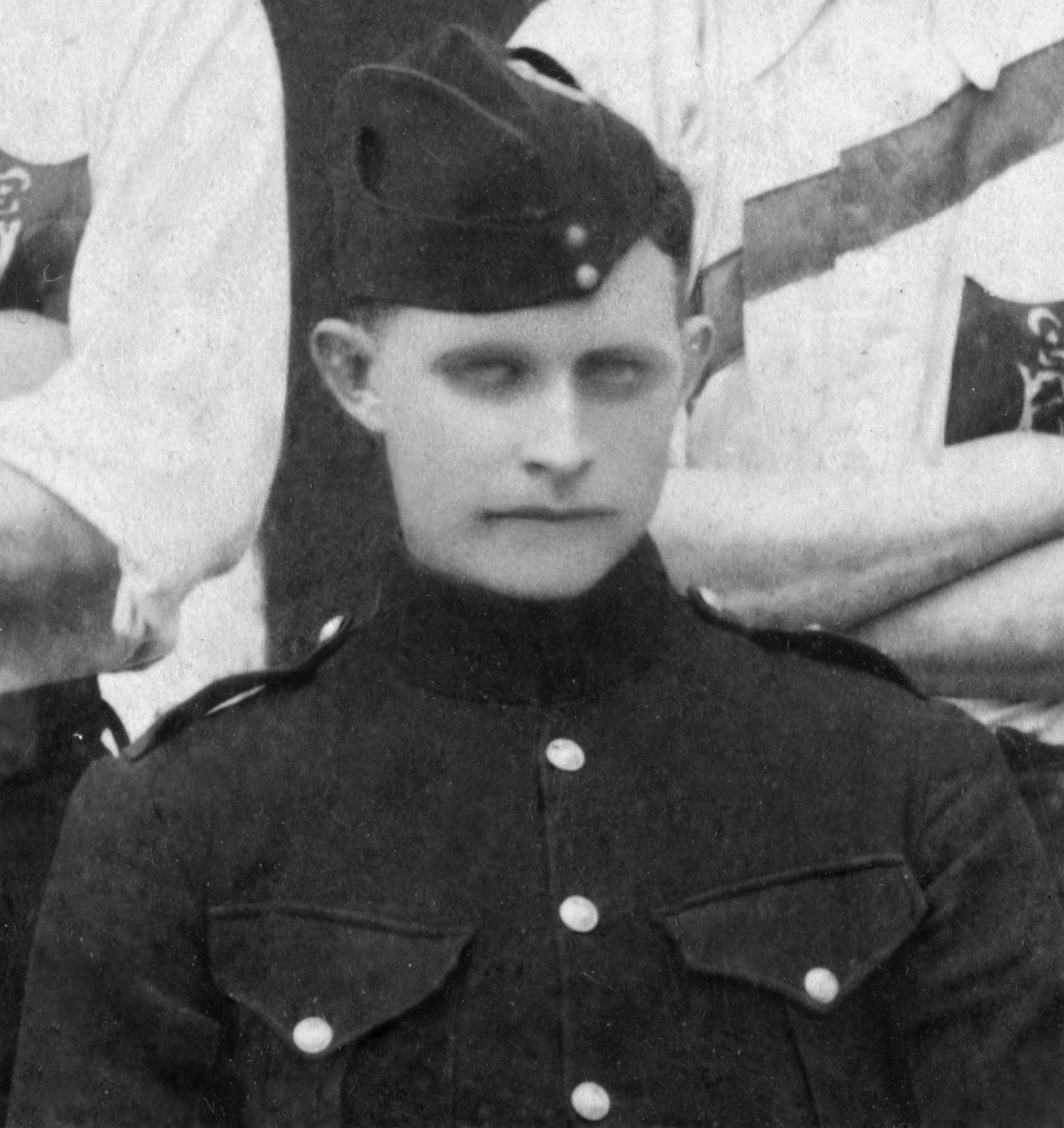
- As a Captain in the Royal Irish Regiment, 1897.
- Born: 1867; Queenstown, Cape Colony
- Died: 2 September 1935 (aged 67–68); Hove, Sussex
- Alma mater: Diocesan College
- Spouse: Louisa Anne Galwey
- Relatives: Frederick York St Leger (father)
- Military career
- Allegiance: United Kingdom
- Branch: British Army
- Rank: Adjutant General
- Unit: Royal Irish Regiment
- Awards: Order of St Michael and St George; Commander of the Royal Victorian Order; Distinguished Service Order

Colonel Stratford Edward St Leger CMG CVO DSO (1867 – 12 October 1935) was an Anglo-Boer War and World War I diarist and artist.

== Early life ==
St Leger was born in Queenstown, Eastern Cape, South Africa, in 1867 to Frederick York St Leger, the Anglican rector of Queenstown, headmaster of St. Andrew's College, Grahamstown, and later the founder of the Cape Times.

Stratford St Leger received his early schooling at Tonbridge School in England and completed his education at Diocesan College in Rondebosch, Cape Town. He had captained Bishops at cricket and rugby union, after he had completed his schooling he was commissioned into the Royal Irish Regiment in 1890 and during his first nine years of peacetime soldiering he played much cricket for the Army team. In 1895 he married Louisa Anne Galwey and had one daughter, Moira Murdoch of Milnerton, Cape Town.

== Boer War ==
St Leger commanded the Cork company of the 1st regiment of mounted infantry. The unit arrived in Table Bay, Cape Town on 11 November 1899 and marched to De Aar. St. Leger and his unit took part in the cavalry charge at Klip Drift, in the relief of Kimberley, the occupation of Bloemfontein, the battles of Sand River and Doornkop and the march on Pretoria in June 1900. He also participated in the Battle of Sanna's Post on 31 March 1900 and rescued Corporal Parker of the Life Guards under heavy enemy fire during the withdrawal.

== Work as an artist ==
St. Leger learned drawing and painting at the schools he attended. During his military campaigns he carried sketch-books in his haversack at all times; he made rough pencil sketches when the opportunity was available and would later work them into final drawings or water colours.

His artwork was being published in the London magazine Black and White by the middle of 1900. His only published book came out in London under the title of War Sketches in Colour in November 1903. In addition to being a detailed account of the experiences of the 1st Mounted it contained full-page reproductions of sixty-six of his sketches in water colour and pen and ink, plus ninety-seven line drawings and five section maps.

St. Leger mounted an exhibition of his work at a gallery in Bruton Street, Mayfair in May and June 1904 and consisted of fifty water colours with fifteen large and a great many smaller pen and ink drawings.

== First World War ==
At the outbreak of the First World War, St. Leger rejoined the Royal Irish and as part of the British Expeditionary Force crossed the English Channel and proceeded to the front. The Royal Irish positions between Mons and Ypres were overrun by a German attack in October 1914, in which many of the regiment were killed or captured. St. Leger (who had received a flesh wound) was cut off from his unit. He made contact with eight other soldiers from several different regiments in a similar plight. They decided to try to make their way through the German lines. They had no maps and relied on his compass and the stars for direction. The party marched only at night, lying up during the day. Eventually they reached safety in the Belgian lines at Oudenarde and returned to England.

St. Leger was awarded the Distinguished Service Order and at the end of the war the Companion of the Order of St Michael and St George, and was posted as Assistant Adjutant General at the War Office. He retired in 1922 and was gazetted full colonel two years later. St. Leger died at Hove in Sussex on 12 October 1935.

== Publications ==
- War Sketches in Colour. Adam & Charles Black. 1903.

== Notes and references ==
=== Sources ===
- Boyden, Peter B.; Harding, Marion; Guy, Alan James (1999). Ashes and Blood: The British Army in South Africa, 1795-1914. National Army Museum. ISBN 978-0-901721-36-5.
- Gretton, G. le M. (1911). The Campaigns and History of the Royal Irish Regiment Form 1684 to 1902. Edinburgh: William Blackwood & Sons.
- Langham-Carter, R.R. (1980). "St Leger's Boer War Sketches". Africana Notes and News. 24. Johannesburg: Africana Society, Africana Museum.
- Langham-Carter, R.R. (June 1981). "Stratford Edward St. Leger: An artist of the South African War of 1899-1902". Military History Journal. 5 (3). South African Military History Society.
- Verwey, E. J. (1995). New Dictionary of South African Biography. Vol. V. HSRC Press. p. 742. ISBN 978-0-7969-1648-8.
