= Lesseyton =

- Location within Eastern Cape Location within South Africa
- Coordinates: 31.833°S 26.766°E
- Country: South Africa
- Province: Eastern Cape
- District: Chris Hani
- Municipality: Enoch Mgijima

Area
  - Total: 2.53 km^{2} (0.98 sq mi)

Population (2011)
  - Total: 2,715
  - Density: 1,070/km^{2} (2,780/sq mi)

Racial makeup (2011)
  - Black African: 99.4%
  - Indian/Asian: 0.1%
  - Other: 0.4%

First languages (2011)
  - Xhosa: 97.5%
  - English: 1.1%
  - Other: 1.4%
- Time zone: UTC+2 (SAST)

Lesseyton is a town in the Enoch Mgijima Local Municipality in the Eastern Cape province of South Africa, located 14 km (8.7 mi) northwest of Queenstown. Almost all residents are Xhosa speakers. Lesseyton has two schools: Lesseyton Primary School and Ndlovukazi Public High School.

Lesseyton was established as a mission station of the Wesleyan Missionary Society in 1847. The people were all Thembu, who mostly retained their customary cultural and religious beliefs. In 1851, a war broke out between the Xhosa and the Cape colonial authorities, and many Thembu joined the hostilities against the colonial government. The Thembu at Lesseyton, however, remained loyal to the British, and fought the rebellion as part of the "Lesseyton Volunteers".
