= Ezibeleni =

Place in Queenstown, Eastern Cape, South Africa

- Location within Eastern Cape Location within South Africa
- Coordinates: 31°54′S 26°58′E
- Country: South Africa
- Province: Eastern Cape
- District: Chris Hani
- Municipality: Enoch Mgijima
- Established: 1974

Area
  - Total: 32.09 km^{2} (12.39 sq mi)
- Elevation: 3,500 m (11,500 ft)

Population (2011)
  - Total: 30,113
  - Density: 938.4/km^{2} (2,430/sq mi)

Racial makeup (2011)
  - Black African: 99.3%
  - Coloured: 0.1%
  - Indian/Asian: 0.1%
  - Other: 0.5%

First languages (2011)
  - Xhosa: 91.5%
  - English: 4.5%
  - Other: 4.0%
- Time zone: UTC+2 (SAST)
- Postal code (street): 5326
- PO box: 5326
- Area code: 047

Ezibeleni is a township in the Eastern Cape Province of South Africa. It was established in the 1960s and officially recognised in 1974, when black South Africans were not allowed to live, but only to work, in the white-dominated Queenstown. In order to pursue the policy of separate development, the apartheid-era government of the time dictated that, due to its location on the map and the predominant Xhosa ethnicity of its people, Ezibeleni would belong to Transkei, one of ten fragmented bantustans, or homelands, scattered across South Africa.

Ezibeleni is one of the largest towns in the Komani area. Its original name was Queensdale, named after Queenstown (today: Komani). It is divided into zones (1, 2, 3, Chancele & Themba), with the new units; known as Kwamabuyaze (RDP houses) which is still expanding.

Komani River flows near or through various towns in the Eastern Cape province of South Africa, including Ezibeleni. The Great Fish River is a significant watercourse in the region, and its proximity to Ezibeleni have environmental and cultural importance for the local community.

The majority of people resident in Ezibeleni live below the living wage according to government economic classifications. There are about 12 schools in the area, 4 lower primary, 3 senior primary, 3 lower high and 2 senior high schools.

The township is known for being a home to some of the best local and school music choirs in the country, Siyaphakama Adult Choir and Bulelani Senior Secondary School to name but a few. Bulelani has represented Eastern Cape in the school's music competitions many times in the last 2 decades and has won many of the South African National School's Choir Competitions.

There is a social life with many church denominations and other social activities.

However, according to Statistics South Africa, the area still has a very high unemployment rate.

Resources are limited. The Buffalo City Metro, according to a report by Cogta MEC Zolile Williams, has 17 fire trucks of which seven are operational. The municipality needs an additional five firetrucks.
