= Don Pinnock =

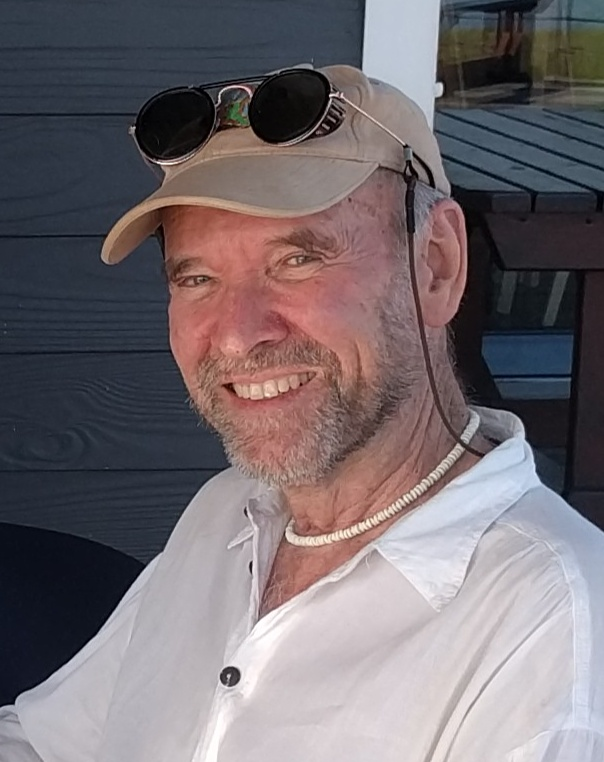
- Born: 1947 (age 77–78); Queenstown, South Africa
- Occupation(s): Writer, photographer, criminologist
- Spouse: Patricia Schonstein
- Children: 2
- Website: www.pinnock.co.za

Donald Pinnock is a South African writer, investigative journalist, and photographer. He was born in 1947, in Queenstown, South Africa, and educated at Queens College. He is a Research Fellow at the Centre of Criminology, University of Cape Town, a former editor of Getaway magazine in Cape Town, and writes for Daily Maverick. He has been a lecturer in journalism and criminology, consultant to the Mandela government, a professional yachtsman, explorer, travel and environmental writer and photographer. His passions are species conservation in Africa and the relationship between early social and biological trauma and high-risk adolescent behavior.

== Academic and professional career ==
Pinnock has a PhD in political science, an MA in criminology, a BA in African history and has published a post-doctoral study on gangs, rituals and rites of passage. He has held lectureships in Journalism (Rhodes) and Criminology (University of Cape Town) and conducted his PhD research at School of Oriental and African Studies, London University. He was the first Writer in Residence at South Africa's Antarctic SANAE IV base (2005–06).

As a criminologist, he was one of the co-drafters for the ANC government of the Youth Justice White Paper, which became the Child Justice Act. He is a specialist in adolescent deviance, was one of the founders of the Usiko Trust and is a trustee of the Chrysalis Academy, both involved with support and training for high-risk youth. He is an Honorary Research Associate in the Centre of Criminology, University of Cape Town.

He was appointed a commissioner of the International Union for Conservation of Nature (IUCN) in 2017.

He has held three photographic exhibitions in Cape Town: The Wonder of Elephants and Postcards from the Road. $treet$ is a traveling exhibition that explores gang life.

He is a columnist for BA High Life and Mahala and researcher/writer for the Conservation Action Trust, The Dodo and Daily Maverick.

== Awards ==
- 1979 – Diocesan College History Prize: African history
- 1993 – Robert Ally Award: journalism
- 1997 – Pica Award: Environment, Wildlife & Conservation Journalism Award
- 1997 – Mondi Award for Journalism: Foresight
- 1998 – Mondi Award for Journalism: Issues
- 1999 – Pica Award: Consumer Journalism
- 1999 – Pica Award: Wildlife & Conservation Journalism Award
- 2001 – Mondi Award for Journalism: Foresight
- 2001 – Mondi Award for Journalism: Columns
- 2009 – Finalist, European Union Literary Award (for Rainmaker)
- 2010 – Finalist, Mondi Award for Journalism: Columns
- 2013 – City Press Non-Fiction Award for his book Gang Town

== Personal life ==
He is married to the novelist and poet Patricia Schonstein, with whom he has a son and a daughter.

== Works ==
- Elsies River: a Popular History, 1981
- The Brotherhoods: Street Gangs and State Control, 1984
- Gangs, Rituals and Rites of Passage, 1997
- Telona, 1998
- They Fought for Freedom, 2000
- Natural Selections: The African Wanderings Of a Bemused Naturalist, 2002
- African Journeys, 2004
- Writing Left: The Radical Journalism of Ruth First, 2007
- Loveletters to Africa, 2008
- Blue Ice: Travels in Antarctica, 2008
- The Woman who Lived in a Tree and Other Perfect Strangers, 2009
- Rainmaker, 2010
- Voices of Liberation: Ruth First, 2012
- Wild Resilience: Working with high-risk adolescents using wilderness, ritual & mentorship, 2015
- Gang Town, 2016
- The Last Elephants, 2019
