= Kaya Malotana =

South African former rugby union player and coach

- Born: Kayalethu Malotana; 30 January 1976 (age 50) Lady Frere, South Africa
- Height: 188 cm (6 ft 2 in)
- Weight: 86 kg (190 lb)

Rugby union career
- Position: Centre
Senior career
Years	Team	Apps	(Points)
1996–1999	Border Bulldogs	42	
2000–2001	Golden Lions	7	
Super Rugby
Years	Team	Apps	(Points)
1999–2000	Cats		
International career
Years	Team	Apps	(Points)
1999	South Africa	1	(0)
Coaching career
- Years: Team
- 2009-?: Lions
- 2010-?: South Africa Women's U20
- 2020 - present: TUT Vikings

Kayalethu Malotana (born 30 January 1976) is a South African former rugby union player, current coach & a Xhosa commentator in rugby. He was educated at Queen's College Boys' High School where he matriculated in 1994 and received honors for Rugby. Under his coaching career, he's coached the backline of the South African U20 Women's National team, the Lions and as of January 2020 was appointed as the head coach of the TUT Vikings.

== Career ==
Debuting in Currie Cup for the Border Bulldogs, Malotana played his first Super Rugby season in 1999 for the Cats, currently Lions.

He played his only match for the Springboks against Spain in the 1999 Rugby World Cup, becoming the first black player to play in South Africa in this edition of the World Cup.

He ended his career in the Pirates, from Johannesburg. Later, in 2007, he was appointed as Development Officer for the Lions, thanks also to his fluency in English, Afrikaans, Xhosa, Zulu and Tswana.

In 2009, he became an assistant coach for the Lions, and in 2010, the backline coach of the South Africa women's Under-20 national team. In January 2020, he was appointed as head coach of the TUT Vikings rugby team. He was once also a head of rugby at his former school, Queen's College.

He's also well known for commentating in isiXhosa alongside former rugby player Lonwabo Mtimka on SuperSport Rugby games.

=== Test history ===
No.	Opposition	Result (SA 1st)	Position	Tries	Date	Venue
1.	Spain	47–3	Centre		10 October 1999	Murrayfield, Edinburgh

== See also ==
- List of South Africa national rugby union players – Springbok no. 687
