= Mlungisi =

Mlungisi is a South African masculine given name. Notable people with the name include:

- Mlungisi Bali (1990–2018), South African rugby union player
- Mlungisi Ngubane (born 1956), South African football player and coach
- Mlungisi Mdluli (born 1980), South African football midfielder
- Mlungisi Zwelihle Gumede (born 1996), South African teacher, scholar and author living in Jozini
- Mlungisi Sisulu (1948–2015), South African businessman and politician
