= Queenstown, South Africa =

Queenstown Komani
- Town
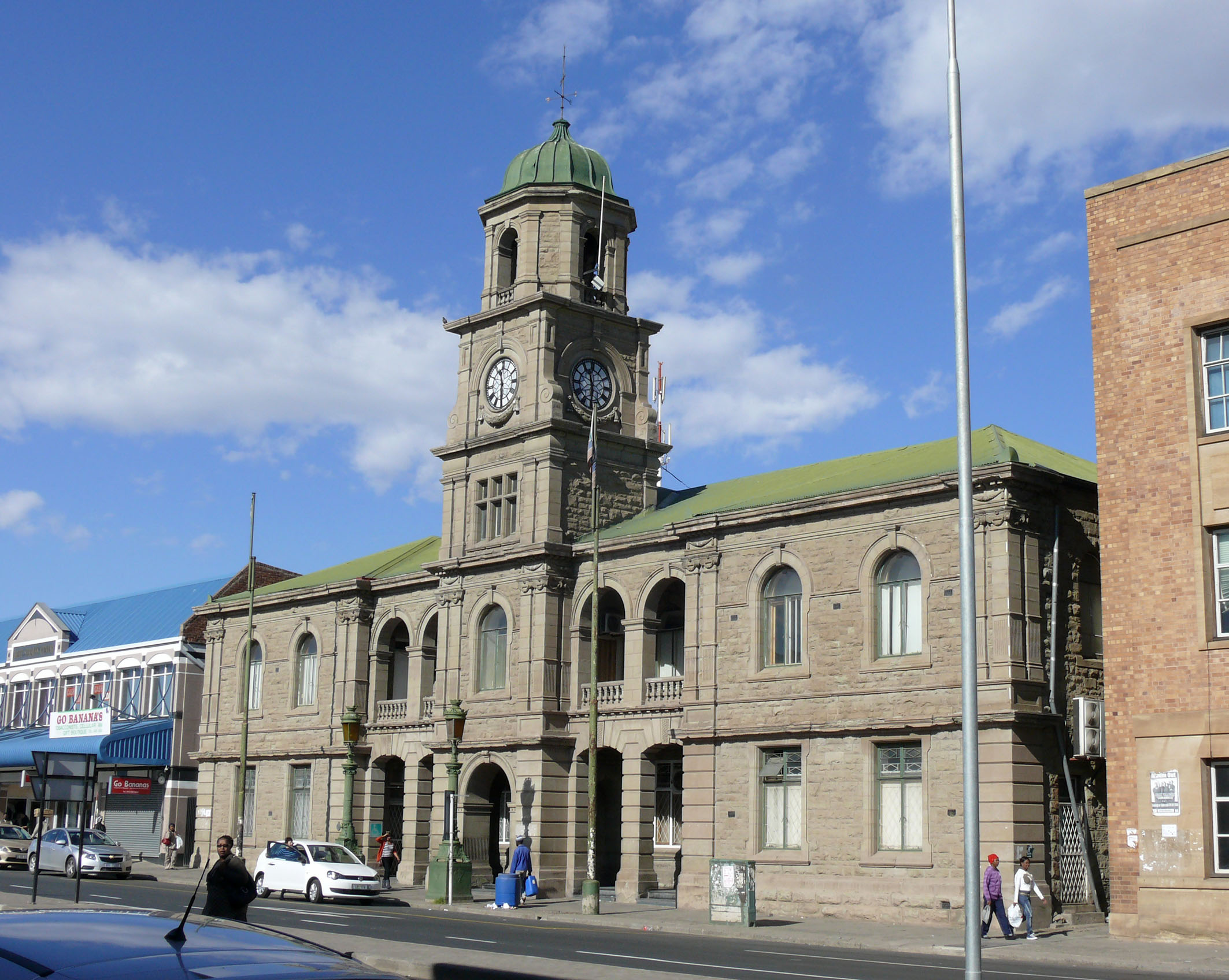
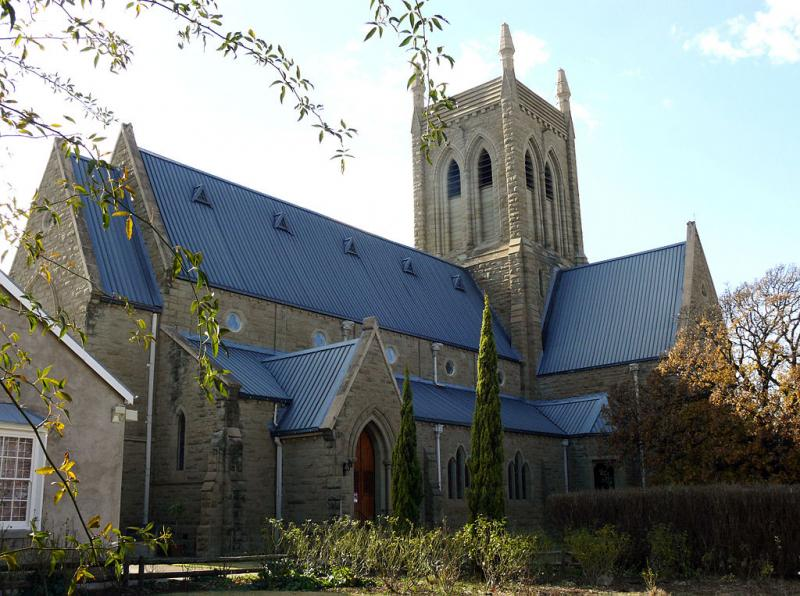
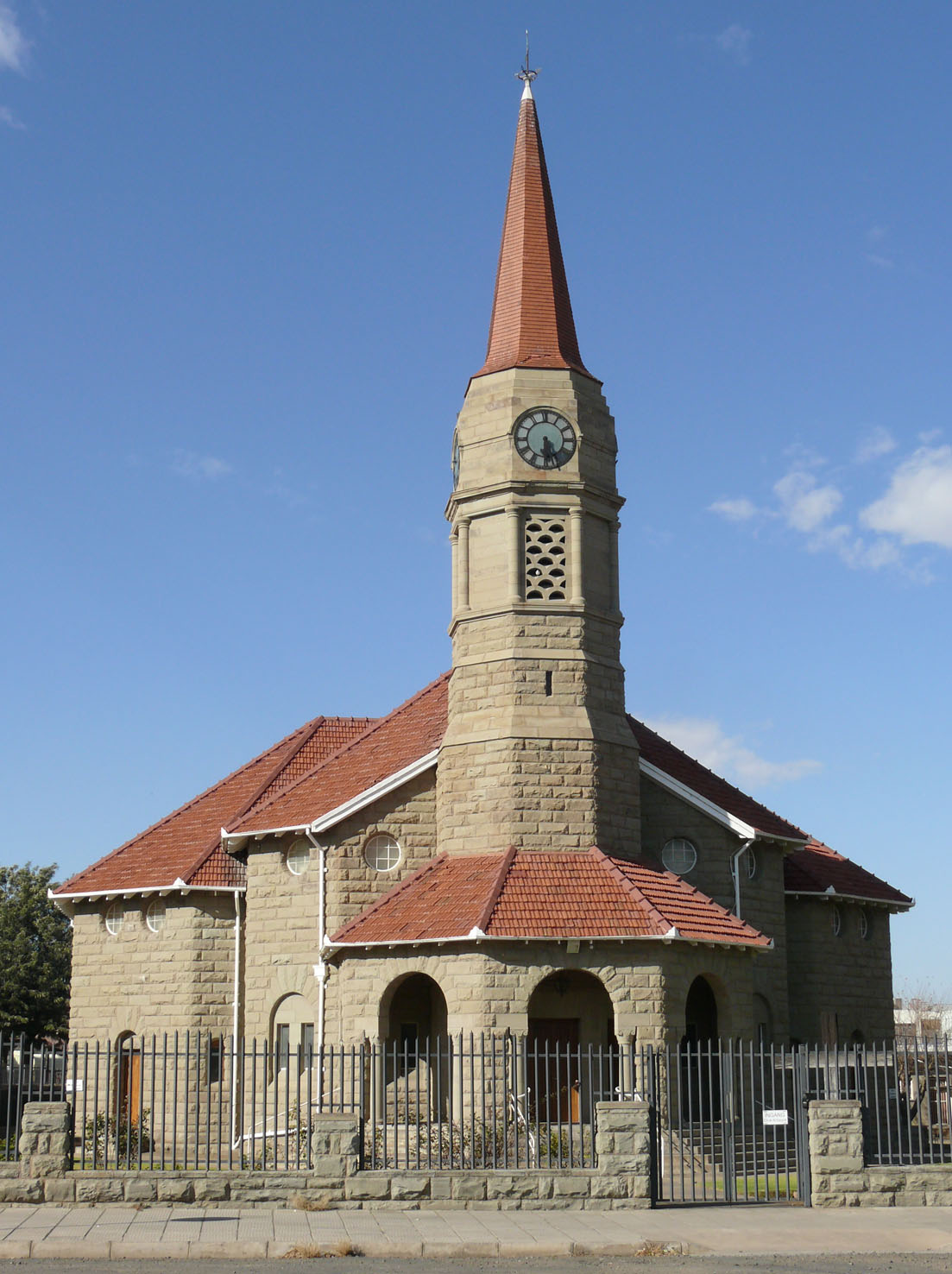
- Clockwise from Top: Queenstown City Hall, Dutch Reformed Church, St Michael Anglican Church.
- Nickname: Rose Capital of South Africa
- Location within Eastern Cape Location within South Africa Location within Africa
- Coordinates: 31°54′S 26°53′E
- Country: South Africa
- Province: Eastern Cape
- District: Chris Hani
- Municipality: Enoch Mgijima
- Established: 1853

Government
  - Mayor: Madoda Pipiyana

Area
  - Total: 71.3 km^{2} (27.5 sq mi)

Population (2011)
  - Total: 68,872
  - Density: 966/km^{2} (2,500/sq mi)

Racial makeup (2011)
  - Black African: 81.8%
  - Coloured: 10.0%
  - Indian/Asian: 1.1%
  - White: 6.5%
  - Other: 0.6%

First languages (2011)
  - Xhosa: 75.2%
  - Afrikaans: 13.8%
  - English: 7.3%
  - Other: 3.7%
- Time zone: UTC+2 (SAST)
- Postal code (street): 5320
- PO box: 5319
- Area code: 045

Queenstown, officially Komani, is a town in the middle of the Eastern Cape Province of South Africa, roughly halfway between the smaller towns of Cathcart and Sterkstroom on the N6 national route. The town was established in 1853 and is currently the commercial, administrative, and educational centre of the surrounding farming district. It is administered by the Enoch Mgijima Local Municipality, part of the regional Chris Hani District Municipality, which has become infamous for corruption, failures of governance, infrastructural decay, and financial collapse. The majestic Town Hall (built in 1882) and central Post Office burnt down in a mysterious 2022 fire which destroyed Municipal records and left the buildings in a vandalised ruin.. The town's amenities and famous Hexagon are in a shabby and derelict condition, reducing the town's former appeal to visitors and tourists. Service collapse has led to capital flight and deindustrialisation, worsening already-massive unemployment as significant formal economic activity declines.

== History ==
Queenstown was founded in early 1853 under the direction of Sir George Cathcart, who named the settlement, and then fort, after Queen Victoria. Work on its railway connection to East London on the coast was begun by the Cape government of John Molteno in 1876, and the line was officially opened on 19 May 1880.

The town war memorial was designed by Sir Robert Lorimer in 1922 with its sculpture by Alice Meredith Williams.

The town prospered from its founding up to the worldwide depression of the 1930s, and again thereafter. In the 1960s, the majority of the black population was moved east to the township of Ezibeleni, as part of the attempt to move African people to so-called "homelands".

Originally in the Cape Province, one of South Africa's four provinces, the town was strategically, economically, and politically important because of its location in the 'Border' region. This was a narrow corridor between the former Xhosa 'homelands' of Transkei and Ciskei. They all became part of the smaller Eastern Cape Province after the 1994 election.. Today, this 'Border-Kei' term is still in use by local residents, businesses, and organisations.

The area has in the past had very severe weather problems, luckily, often only affecting the surrounding areas. In 2002, heavy snowfall around Queenstown caused a severe disaster, especially since the area was not funded or ready for such a disaster. Then, in 2004, the surrounding areas of the Eastern Cape were affected by strong winds and heavy rainfall, although Queenstown once again escaped much flooding and some wind damage, power shortages soon followed. Other natural disasters include droughts and wildfires.

In February 2016, the government changed the official name for the town from "Queenstown" to "Komani".

In 2024, local residents petitioned the Constitutional Court of South Africa to decide on formally abolishing the town's Municipal Administration because of its failure to deliver constitutionally-guaranteed basic services.

== Education ==
Tertiary education institutions in Queenstown include Walter Sisulu University and Boston City Campus and Business College. Queens College Boys' High School is also located in the town.

== Religion ==
The city is the seat of the Roman Catholic Diocese of Queenstown, centred at the Cathedral of Christ the King. It is also the seat of the Anglican Church's Diocese of Ukhahlamba, whose imposing Cathedral Church of St. Michael and All Angels stands adjacent to the town's public gardens. Churches of all faith denominations are to be found in and around the town.

== Geography ==
The town lies on the Komani River which forms part of the Great Kei system of rivers and has a plentiful water supply from the surrounding rugged mountains. The water is collected in the Bongolo Dam, set in the hills, used extensively for recreation and watersports. Each year, around the beginning of June, the town holds an art exhibition with an emphasis on paintings and sculpture.

== Layout ==
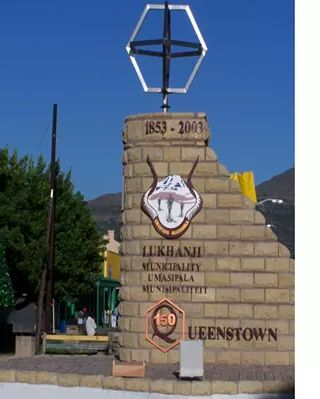
The abstract sculpture erected in The Hexagon in the centre of Queenstown for the 150th anniversary.

The layout of the town reflects its original objective as a defensive stronghold for the frontier area and has a most unusual design. There is a central hexagonal area where cannon or rifle fire could be directed down six thoroughfares radiating from the centre. The cannon sites have now been replaced with gardens and a central fountain. An abstract sculpture replaced the fountain as part of the town's 150th anniversary. The Hexagon still exists, with the outer road surrounding it named Robinson Road, which encircles it. Surrounding The Hexagon to the east and west lie more commercial and administrative facilities.

Currently, formerly 'white suburbs' (Sandringham, Kingsway, Windsor, Bergsig, Blue Rise, Balmoral, Madeira Park and a new suburb of Komani Park) surround the hexagon to the north, east and west, however, one of the city's great townships (and squatter camps) lies to the south. It is a collection of black and coloured townships named Mlungisi, Aloevale, a new township, Victoria Park has been built to the south-east of the city. East of the town lies the much larger Ezibeleni township, which although roughly the same surface area as the main town, has by far a larger population.

== Climate ==
Queenstown has a cold semi-arid climate (Köppen climate classification: BSk), that borders on a subtropical highland climate (Köppen climate classification: Cfb), and a humid subtropical climate (Köppen climate classification: Cfa).

Climate data for Queenstown
Month	Jan	Feb	Mar	Apr	May	Jun	Jul	Aug	Sep	Oct	Nov	Dec	Year
Record high °C (°F)	40.6 (105.1)	40.0 (104.0)	37.2 (99.0)	34.0 (93.2)	31.1 (88.0)	26.1 (79.0)	26.4 (79.5)	31.1 (88.0)	35.0 (95.0)	37.8 (100.0)	38.1 (100.6)	40.0 (104.0)	40.6 (105.1)
Mean daily maximum °C (°F)	29.3 (84.7)	28.7 (83.7)	27.0 (80.6)	23.9 (75.0)	20.6 (69.1)	18.3 (64.9)	18.2 (64.8)	20.2 (68.4)	22.9 (73.2)	24.7 (76.5)	26.4 (79.5)	28.6 (83.5)	24.2 (75.6)
Daily mean °C (°F)	21.9 (71.4)	21.7 (71.1)	20.1 (68.2)	16.6 (61.9)	13.3 (55.9)	10.6 (51.1)	10.6 (51.1)	12.4 (54.3)	15.1 (59.2)	17.1 (62.8)	19.0 (66.2)	21.1 (70.0)	16.7 (62.1)
Mean daily minimum °C (°F)	14.5 (58.1)	14.7 (58.5)	13.3 (55.9)	9.4 (48.9)	6.0 (42.8)	3.0 (37.4)	2.9 (37.2)	4.6 (40.3)	7.3 (45.1)	9.5 (49.1)	11.6 (52.9)	13.5 (56.3)	9.2 (48.6)
Record low °C (°F)	3.9 (39.0)	3.9 (39.0)	1.5 (34.7)	−1.1 (30.0)	−5.5 (22.1)	−6.7 (19.9)	−7.5 (18.5)	−6.7 (19.9)	−3.8 (25.2)	−1.7 (28.9)	0.1 (32.2)	3.0 (37.4)	−7.5 (18.5)
Average precipitation mm (inches)	77 (3.0)	88 (3.5)	83 (3.3)	40 (1.6)	24 (0.9)	14 (0.6)	13 (0.5)	16 (0.6)	26 (1.0)	40 (1.6)	58 (2.3)	72 (2.8)	551 (21.7)
Average precipitation days (≥ 0.1 mm)	10.6	11.0	11.0	7.3	5.4	3.0	3.0	3.6	4.5	8.2	8.6	9.0	85.2
Average relative humidity (%)	64	68	68	66	62	58	54	52	56	61	64	62	61
Source: Deutscher Wetterdienst

== Geology ==
The Queenstown area is in the Burgersdorp Formation of the Tarkastad subgroup, in the upper Beaufort Group Triassic in age in the karoo supergroup. The lithology is red mudstone 1 to 10 m rich layers and sub-ordinate 1 to 2 m rich sandstone layers deposited by meandering rivers in the flood plain in an oxidising environment gradually filling the Karoo basin. The formation reaches a thickness of 600 m in the Komani (Queenstown) and Lady Frere area. Numerous dolerite dykes and ring structures have intruded the area creating localities for groundwater exploration.

== Media ==
The town has two newspapers, The Representative and The Express. It has a community radio station, Lukhanji FM. The Eastern Cape newspaper, Daily Dispatch, is widely read in the area.

== Coats of arms ==
The Queenstown municipal council assumed a pseudo-heraldic coat of arms in October 1902. The shield was quartered and depicted the Union Jack, a landscape with Hangklip mountain in the background, a landscape with a mimosa tree in the foreground, and a portrait of King Edward VII. The crest was a demi-antelope, and the motto Unity is strength. The council later assumed a new coat of arms. The new shield displayed a golden royal coronet on a red background. The crest was the same as before, but the motto was translated into Latin as Ex unitate vires.

== Notable people ==
Queenstown has produced 2 Olympians and a plethora of musicians, sportsmen (national and international) and more. Some notable names hailing from the town are:

- Linky Boshoff
- Lionel Cronje
- Daryll Cullinan
- Carlo Del Fava
- Allan Dell
- S'bura Sithole
- Glen Dell
- Mongezi Feza
- Ian Greig
- Tony Greig
- Justin Kemp
- Robbi Kempson
- Rayne Kruger (1922–2002) — author
- Kaya Malotana
- Ken McEwan
- Pat Matshikiza
- Todd Matshikiza
- Stompie Mavi
- Lwazi Mvovo
- Don Pinnock
- Olive Schreiner
- Margaret Singana
- Minah Soga
- Jomo Sono
- Stratford Edward St Leger
- Marius Corbett
- Yaw Penxe
- Simphiwe Matanzima
- Jimmy White
- Roelof Smit
- John Frost
- Rabz Maxwane
- Pat Spence
- Rocco Jansen
- Rex Witte
- Isaac Bangani Tabata
- Andisa Ntsila
- Elaine Bellew-Bryan, Baroness Bellew
- David Roos
- Dave Callaghan
- Delarey du Preez
- Ken Austin (cricketer)
- Harry Schmidt (pentathlete)
- George Patching
