= Durban High School =

Location
- 255 St. Thomas Road, Musgrave; Bera/Musgrave; Durban, KwaZulu-Natal; South Africa; 29°50′40″S 30°59′52″E

Information
- Other name: D.H.S.
- School type: All-boys public school
- Motto: Deo Fretus (In God We Trust)
- Established: 1866; 160 years ago
- Sister school: Maris Stella School
- School district: District 9
- Headmaster: Tony Pinheiro
- Grades: 8–12
- Gender: Male
- Age: 13 to 18
- Enrollment: 1100 boys
- Language: English
- Schedule: 07:30 – 15:00
- Campus: Urban campus
- Campus size: Approx. area: 54,988.47 m²; Approx. perimeter: 945.61 m
- Campus type: Suburban
- Houses: Blackmore; Campbell; Grice; Langley; Payne; Swales
- Colours: Blue; Gold
- Rivals: Glenwood High School (Durban); Maritzburg College; Westville Boys' High School
- Newspaper: The Herald
- Boarding houses: Blackmore
- Website: www.durbanhighschool.co.za

Durban High School (Better known as D.H.S.) is a public English-language high school for boys situated in the suburb of Musgrave in Durban in the KwaZulu-Natal province of South Africa.

DHS opened its doors in 1866 in two rooms and with seven pupils in Smith Street. From there it moved to a disused granary in Cato Square in 1880, just after the Zulu War, and then to the Old Hospital on the foreshore. In 1895, it moved up onto the healthier Berea to its present site, where it flourished. The ten acres plot was granted to the School by the Durban Town Council. The first enrolled student was a boy called Eben Coates and he was also the first Head-boy. There is also a related primary school: Durban Preparatory High School. The school has approximately 1000 enrolled students, all boys, and includes a small boarding establishment and over 75 teachers. The headmaster is Mr. Tony Pinheiro with the main Deputy Headmaster, Mr Gavin Goodwin. It is the oldest standing school in Durban and one of the oldest in South Africa. It has one of the highest numbers of international test cricket representatives in Southern Africa.

== Houses ==
There are six houses:

- Swales – old gold
- Grice – turquoise
- Langley – red
- Campbell – green
- Payn – Oxford blue
- Blackmore (the boarders' house) – white

Blackmore House has capacity for over 130 boys. The boys' needs are catered for by boarder masters, food provision and dormitories with a maximum of six boys per dorm. The boys can go home most weekends and return on Monday mornings.

== Headmasters ==
- 1866–1875: R. Russell
- 1875–1880:
- 1880–1886: R. P. Sandford
- 1886–1909: W. H. Nicholas
- 1910–1930: A. S. Langley
- 1931–1945: J. Black
- 1945–1952: Col. A. C. Martin
- 1952–1959: G. J. Armstrong
- 1959–1970: A. W. McIver
- 1971–1983: D. C. Thompson
- 1984–1993: K. L. Tomlinson
- 1994–1996: R. D. Forde
- 1997–2003: I. T. Bennison
- 2004–2014: D. A. Magner
- 2014–2016: L. Erasmus
- 2017–present: A. D. Pinheiro

== Sports ==
A wide range of sports and activities are offered including climbing, golf, fishing, surfing, chess, badminton, squash cross country, football, basketball, and hardball as well as the more traditional athletics, cricket, hockey, and rugby which have been played at the school for over 100 years. The school has produced over 140 international sportsmen in sports ranging from rugby and cricket to golf, badminton, baseball, surfing and powerlifting. Countries represented include France, New Zealand, England, Scotland, Germany and the United States. More than 30 old boys have played international cricket, six of whom were Wisden Cricketers of the Year. Five old boys played in the 1960 Lords test against England and four in the first two tests against Australia in 1969/70.

== Notable people ==
=== Staff ===
- 'Skonk' Nicholson, renowned schools rugby coach. Coached seven Springboks including Joel Stransky and Butch James, both world cup winning fly-halves when he coached the first XV at Maritzburg College. Coach of 14 unbeaten College teams. In his 35 seasons in charge of the College First XV his teams established a playing record of, Played 504, Won 403, Drew 49 and Lost 52. DHS First XV rugby, First XI cricket and Head Prefect. Natal School's Rugby.
- Cecil (Bill) Payn, Springbok rugby. Taught at the school from 1915 to 1953. Bill fought in both World Wars and was awarded the Military Medal in 1941, aged 47, while in action in the Western Desert. Prisoner of war in Germany with fellow DHS teacher Izak Van Heerden. Ran the 90 km Comrades Marathon in rugby boots. Provincial cricket, baseball, athletics and boxing.
- Izak Van Heerden. School, Natal, Springbok and Argentina rugby coach. POW in Germany with another DHS teacher, Bill Payn. Taught at DHS for 39 years. Izak died at the school in 1973.
- A. J. Human, taught at the school for 52 years being one of the oldest serving staff members of the Durban High School in which time he taught physical sciences. He has a functions room named in honour of his dedicated and committed service to school.

=== Alumni ===
==== Politics ====
- Radclyffe Cadman. MP and leader of The New Republic Party. Administrator of Natal Province. MA (Cantab), LL.B. Royal Navy in WW2.
- Rupert Ellis-Brown, Mayor of Durban. Represented SA in Sailing at the 1924 Summer Olympics – Monotype (Paris) and in Sailing at the 1928 Summer Olympics (Amsterdam).
- Alec Erwin, MP. Minister of Trade and Industry (1996–2004). President of the United Nations Conference on Trade and Development (1996–2000).
- Dr Ernest George Jansen MP, Governor-General of the Union of South Africa (1950–1959).
- Senator Denis Gem Shepstone, Administrator of Natal Province. South African delegate to General Assembly of United Nations.
- Sir Gavyn Arthur, former Lord Mayor of London. Another DHS boy to end up at Harrow School. Appointed a High Court Judge in the UK in 2008.

==== Academics ====
- David W. Brokensha (1923–2017) was a South African anthropologist and university professor, known for his work on Indigenous development and cultures in Africa.
- Tim Couzens (1944–2016) was a South African literary and social historian, and travel writer, employed in the Graduate School for Humanities and Social Sciences at the University of the Witwatersrand.
- Dr Percy Deift. Professor of Mathematics at Courant Institute of Mathematical Sciences, New York University. Awarded The George Polya Prize, 1998. Named a Guggenheim Fellow in 1999. PhD-Princeton University. Dux 1962
- Thomas John I'Anson Bromwich. Professor of Mathematics, Queen's College, Galway, Ireland. Fellow of the Royal Society. Senior Wrangler, Cambridge 1897.
- Sir Aaron Klug, Nobel Prize in Chemistry 1982. Scientific advisor to the British Government. President of The Royal Society, governor at the Scripps Research Institute, US, Dux 1941
- Dr David Papineau, King's College London. Professor of the Philosophy of Science. PhD-Cambridge. Dux 1963.
- Dr Mervyn Susser, member Royal College of Physicians (Edinburgh). Sergievsky Professor of Epidemiology at Columbia University, New York, US
- Phillip V. Tobias, palaeoanthropologist. Doctorates in medicine, genetics and palaeoanthropology. Nominated three times for a Nobel Prize. Dux 1942.
- Dr Trevor Wadley, invented the Tellurometer in 1957, the Wadley Loop and an Ionosonde. Awarded the Frank P. Brown Medal in 1970.

==== Business ====
- Graham Atkinson: Chief Executive Officer Umgeni Water (1987–1996), a state-owned entity. It is one of Africa's most successful organisations involved in water management, and is the largest supplier of bulk potable water in KwaZulu-Natal.
- Stephen Mulholland, CEO Times Media Limited (Formerly SAAN) 1986–1992. CEO Fairfax Group (Australia) 1992–1996. Two time All American Swimming Champion and South African national champion.
- Stephen Bradley Saad, founder and CEO of Aspen Pharmacare, Africa's largest pharmaceutical manufacturer. First XV rugby.

==== Past president of NUSAS ====
- Phillip V. Tobias, 1948 President of the National Union of South African Students. Professor of Palaeoanthropology at Wits.

==== Judiciary ====
- Sir Gavyn Arthur appointed a British High Court Judge in 2008.
- Justice Malcolm Wallis, Judge of the Supreme Court of Appeal and honorary Professor of Law in the University of KwaZulu-NataL.

==== Military ====
- Sq Ldr Johannes Jacobus le Roux, RAF, Battle of Britain. Distinguished Flying Cross and two Bars. His squadron wounded Field Marshal Erwin Rommel when his car overturned during an aerial attack just after D-Day. First XV rugby.
- Paddy Roberts. Lawyer and WW 2 Royal Air Force (RAF) pilot. Commercial BOAC pilot after the war. Turned to songwriting and singing, writing numerous UK hits and film scores. Won five Ivor Novello Awards
- Eric Cowley Saville, DFC. SAAF and RAF
- Major Edwin Swales. Victoria Cross, Distinguished Flying Cross. SAAF and RAF. Pathfinder Master Bomber.
- Michael Turner, WW2 RAF Pilot. Became a stage, television and film actor in Britain after the war.

==== Arts and media ====
- Roy Campbell, poet, author and adventurer.
- Howard Carpendale. 'Schlager' singer, sold over 50 million records in German speaking countries. Won Goldene Europa Award in 1978 and 1987, Goldene Stimmgabel prize in 1981, '84, '86 and 1987. First XV rugby, First XI cricket and Natal School's athletics.
- Jack Cope, author.
- Marius Gabriel novelist. Has written numerous romance and mystery novels. Wrote and illustrated the children's book Smartypig.
- Laurence Gandar, editor Rand Daily Mail. Anti-apartheid campaigner. World Press Freedom Hero (2010). School Athletics, Natal Athletics. Captain, 6th SA Armoured Brigade in WW2.
- Ross Garland, Advocate and film producer (including Spud) and Rhodes Scholar. Won the Golden Bear for best film at the Berlin International Film Festival (2005). First XI cricket.
- Tony Heard, journalist and author.
- Noel Langley novelist and playwright. Wrote the film scenario for The Wizard of Oz.
- Fernando Pessoa (1888 –1935 ) Portuguese poet, writer, literary critic, translator, and publisher; has been described as one of the most significant literary figures of the 20th century and one of the greatest poets in Portuguese literature.
- Marc Raubenheimer, concert pianist.
- Paddy Roberts, RAF pilot. Commercial BOAC pilot after the war. Turned to songwriting and singing, writing numerous UK hits and film scores. Won five Ivor Novello Awards.
- Victor Stiebel. London fashion designer. Studied architecture at Jesus College, Cambridge.
- Michael Turner WW2 RAF pilot. Became a stage, television and film actor in Britain.

==== Rhodes Scholars ====
- Ross Garland 1997
- Peter Sacks 1973
- John Nicolson, Rhodes Scholar. Head Boy, captain of cricket and rugby.

===== Cricket =====
All represented South Africa except where noted: (Note: Over 200 old boys have played provincial cricket in South Africa or county cricket in England.)

- Hashim Amla. SA test captain. World Cup 2007, 2011, 2015 and 2019. His 311 not out in the first test at The Oval in 2012 is the second highest by a SA batsman in test cricket. Wisden Cricketer of the Year 2013. Quickest SA batsman to score 20 test centuries and the fastest batsman from all countries to score 7000 runs in ODIs.
- Dale Benkenstein. Gold medal, Commonwealth Games, Malaysia 1998. Michaelhouse school also.
- Horace Chapman
- J. A. J. Christy
- Nick Compton (represented England). Toured England with the DHS first XI captained by Hashim Amla. Averaged 99.60 for Somerset in county cricket in 2012. Tests for England beginning 2012. Wisden Cricketer of the Year 2013. Hilton College and Harrow School (England)
- Dalton Conyngham
- Bertram Cooley, chosen for the 1901 tour to England but did not play a test match.
- Eric Dalton. SA tennis and SA golf also.
- Nummy Dean, SA test captain. Maritzburg College also.
- Richard Dumbrill
- Dennis Dyer
- Jonathan Fellows-Smith. Rugby Blue, Oxford University (1950s). (Note: All five played in the Lords test match in 1960. Richards, Goddard, Irvine and Gamsy all played in the first two tests against Australia in 1969/70.)
- Dennis Gamsy, wicketkeeper. First XV rugby.
- Trevor Goddard. SA test captain and opening bat and Test cricket's most economical bowler (av 1.64/over). Provincial football.
- Geoff Griffin. First South African to take a hat-trick in a test match (Lords 1960). First XV rugby, Natal School's Athletics, Natal U19 rugby, Rhodesia hockey.
- Tyron Henderson, First XV rugby. Kent and Middlesex and Rajasthan Royals (IPL).
- Lee Irvine Highest First XI batting average at DHS in a season. Scored 1310 runs at an average of 68.95 in 21 innings (Wade Wingfield scored 1510 runs in 1995). School First XV rugby and School Athletics.
- Jon Kent.
- Imraan Khan. Opened the innings in the third test against Australia in Cape Town in the absence of SA captain Graeme Smith (2009). Not the Pakistan captain.
- Lance Klusener, "Zulu", ICC 1999 World Cup Man of the Tournament despite SA not playing in the final, Wisden Cricketer of the Year 2000. Took 8/64 in India's second innings on debut in Kolkata in 1996. Klusener's World Cup batting average of 124 is the highest for any batsman and 16 higher than the second best.
- Nevil Lindsay.
- Ainsley Ndlovu – Zimbabwe.
- John Nicolson, Rhodes Scholar. Holds the record, set with another old boy, I. J. "Jack" Siedle, of 424 runs for the first wicket in provincial cricket in SA. Nicolson made 252 not out. Head Boy, captain of cricket and rugby.
- Sid Pegler
- Barry Richards. Broke Don Bradman's record for the number of runs in a season playing for South Australia, 1970/71. In ten first class matches he scored 1538 runs at an average of 109.86. Wisden Cricketer of the Year 1969.
- Mike Rindel. Gold medal, 1998 Commonwealth Games, when SA won the cricket tournament.
- George Shepstone, Maritzburg College, DHS and Repton School.
- Jack Siedle. Holds the record, set with another old boy John Nicolson, of the highest opening stand in provincial cricket in South Africa of 424 runs. Shared in a 260-run opening partnership with Bruce Mitchell against England at Newlands (1930/1).
- Richard Snell. World Cup 1992. First old boy to represent South Africa after the country's re-admission to international competition in 1992.
- Hugh Tayfield. Took 9/113 in England's second innings at The Wanderers in 1957. Wisden Cricketer of the Year in 1956. Bowled 137 consecutive balls in the Durban Test in 1957 against England without conceding a run. This is still a test record. Wisden considers his 9/113 the finest performance by a bowler in test matches.
- Dan Taylor (1914), brother of Herbie Taylor.
- Herbie Taylor. SA captain. Attended the Prep school (D.P.H.S.), when it was part of DHS, and Michaelhouse. Military Cross in WW1. Wisden Cricketer of the Year 1925.
- Colin Wesley. First XV rugby.

===== Rugby =====
- Andrew Aitken. Debut against France 1997.
- Matt Alexander, US scored 286 points in 24 matches for the US at fly-half (1995–1998)
- BJ Botha. South Africa – Springboks, Position – Prop. World Cup Winner, Rugby World Cup 2007. Kloof High School also.
- Phepsi Buthelezi, first Springbok cap on 20 July 2024 v Portugal and scored a try.
- Antonie Claassen, France- flank/8th man. SA U19. Head Prefect. His father Wynand captained the Springboks.
- Alistair Hargreaves, South Africa- Lock. Captained the SA U19 team that won the U19 World Cup in 2005. Captained Saracens in English Premiership .
- Skonk Nicholson, school master, author and renowned rugby coach. First XI, First XV, Head Prefect. Captain Natal School's Rugby.
- Greg Rawlinson, New Zealand – All Blacks, Position – Lock/second row.

===== Athletics =====
- Clarence Oldfield, Silver medal 4 × 400 m relay in 1920 Summer Olympics in Antwerp, Belgium.
- Sydney Atkinson, Gold medal 110m hurdles, 1928 Summer Olympic Games in Amsterdam, silver in the same event in 1924 Olympics in Paris.

===== Triathlon =====
- Henri Schoeman, Bronze medal in 2016 Rio Olympics. Gold medal 2018 Commonwealth Games. Oakridge College also.

===== Surfing, swimming, lifesaving and canoeing =====
- Hank McGregor, eleven-time world K-1 Marathon Champion and winner of 10 Berg River Canoe Marathons.
- Stephen Mulholland, SA Swimming and All American swimming champion.
- Shaun Tomson, 1977 IPS World Champion Surfer.

===== Golf =====
- Eric Dalton. Won the SA Amateur Championship (1950) and Represented SA at the Commonwealth Tournament at St Andrews in 1954.
- Derek James. Represented SA in the Eisenhower Trophy in 1982.
- Rory Sabbatini. Won the World Cup of Golf in 2003 partnered by Trevor Immelman. Finished second in the 2007 Masters Tournament. Represented SA in World Cup from 2002 to 2009 and Presidents Cup (2007). Won the Greater Vancouver Open in 2000, his first tournament as a professional. Won the silver medal at the 2020 Olympic Games in Tokyo after closing with an Olympic record 10-under round of 61.

===== Tennis =====
- David Adams, SA Davis Cup. Won two Grand Slam mixed doubles titles.
- Eric Dalton, SA Davis Cup. SA Cricket and Golf also.
- Victor Gauntlett, SA Tennis.
- Vernon Kirby, SA Davis Cup. Runner-up 1931 and 1937 French Open, Men's Doubles. First XI cricket.
- John Yuill, Professional tennis player. 1974 SA Davis Cup Team.

===== Field hockey =====
- Geoffrey Abbott, SA.
- Richard Curtis, SA.
- Grant Robertson, SA.

===== Other sports =====
- Eric Dalton-SA Golf, Tennis and Cricket.
- Rupert Ellis-Brown, represented SA in sailing in 1924 and 1928 Olympic Games.
- Dave Hudson, yachtsman. Represented SA in the Admiral's Cup (1975), the Olympic Games (1992), the ISAF Games (1994) and in 14 World Championships between 1968 and 2009.
- Warren Lewis – Footballer, SA (2 caps in 2000), Durban City, WIts University, Amazulu, Orlando Pirates, Moroka Swallows. Scored the first goal in the PSL.
- Ian McLeod, World Cup football referee (France 1998).
