= Attridge =

Attridge is a surname. Notable people with it include:

- Derek Attridge (born 1945), British professor of English
- Florence Attridge (1901–1975), British woman
- Gus Attridge, South African businessman
- Harold W. Attridge (born 1946), American professor of divinity
