= Ann Kaplan Mulholland =

Canadian entrepreneur, author, and television personality

- Born: November 2, 1960 (age 66); Winnipeg, Canada
- Occupations: Businesswoman, television personality
- Known for: Cast member on The Real Housewives of Toronto
- Spouse: Stephen Mulholland

Ann Kaplan Mulholland is a Canadian entrepreneur, business executive, author, and television personality. In 2017, she appeared as one of the main cast members of the reality television series The Real Housewives of Toronto.

== Early life ==
Kaplan Mulholland was born in Winnipeg and grew up in Victoria, British Columbia.

== Career ==
Kaplan Mulholland founded iFinance Canada in 1996, initially based in Vancouver, to provide loans for elective medical and dental procedures, and later expanded it into a national provider of consumer financing through brands including Medicard, Dentalcard, and Petcard. By 2013, Global News described iFinance Canada as the country's biggest provider of plastic surgery financing, reporting that it had lent more than $200 million for cosmetic procedures and worked with a network of about 8,000 clinics and practitioners across Canada. Her work in financial services has been featured in Canadian business media, and she has been profiled as a leader in the intersection of healthcare and consumer credit.

She has been a finalist for multiple business awards, including the EY Entrepreneur of the Year Award (Ontario) in 2013 and the RBC Canadian Women Entrepreneur Awards in 2015. She has also been included among Canada's Top Women Business Owners by Women of Influence.

In 2022, specialty lender Iceberg Finance Inc. acquired all of the shares of iFinance Canada, in a transaction that combined the companies’ consumer-finance portfolios and expanded Iceberg's national footprint in medical and retail point-of-sale lending.

Kaplan Mulholland has been featured in business and lifestyle publications such as Dolce, Toronto Life, Financial Post, and The Globe and Mail for her work in entrepreneurship, leadership, and finance.

She has appeared as a guest speaker at business and academic institutions, including the Rotman School of Management at the University of Toronto.

Through iFinance Canada, Kaplan Mulholland has supported health-related charities such as the Herbie Fund at Toronto's Hospital for Sick Children and the non-profit Transforming Faces. A 2013 profile noted that her family helped host an Ethiopian child in Toronto for reconstructive surgery funded in part by these organizations, and later sponsored her immigration to Canada.

== Television ==
Before joining reality television, Kaplan Mulholland hosted cosmetic makeover programmes on the Global Television Network, including NYtv, Beauty by Design and The Ultimate Makeover, which profiled surgical and non-surgical cosmetic procedures and patient makeovers.

She has also fronted online segments under the CosmedicTv banner, featuring cosmetic procedures and industry experts.

In 2017, Kaplan Mulholland appeared as one of the six main cast members on the reality television series The Real Housewives of Toronto, which aired on Slice. In 2025, she began starring in the CTV Life Channel docuseries Queen of the Castle, which follows her and her husband, plastic surgeon Stephen Mulholland, as they renovate and operate Lympne Castle in Kent, England, as a luxury venue.

== Books ==
Kaplan Mulholland is the author of several non-fiction books on entrepreneurship, personal success, and cosmetic medicine, including:

- How to Be Successful in Spite of Yourself (2019)
- If You Don't Laugh, You'll Cry: Cosmetic Enhancement Humor (2009)

She has been interviewed about her writing and business philosophy in publications such as Chaarmz Magazine and The Badass CEO.

== Board service ==
Kaplan Mulholland has served on the board of CAN (Canadian Arts and Business organization).

== Personal life ==
She is married to Canadian plastic surgeon Stephen Mulholland. Their blended family consists of eight children: two from his previous relationship, two from hers, two they have together, and two of her late sister's children, whom they took in after her sister's death.

In 2023, they purchased Lympne Castle, a medieval estate in Kent, England, and began its restoration as a hotel and events venue. She has been profiled in Canadian media for balancing entrepreneurship, television appearances, and family life.
