= Skonk Nicholson =

South African rugby coach and teacher (1917–2011)

James Mervyn Nicholson
- Born: February 6, 1917; Underberg, Natal, Union of South Africa
- Died: February 27, 2011 (aged 94); Pietermaritzburg, KwaZulu-Natal, South Africa
- Other name: Skonk Nicholson
- Education: University of Natal (Pietermaritzburg)
- Occupations: Teacher; coach
- Years active: 1948–2011

James Mervyn Nicholson (6 February 1917 – 27 February 2011), better known as Skonk Nicholson, was a rugby coach and school master at Maritzburg College. He is often credited with having trained large numbers of provincial and Springbok players, and was an iconic figure of schoolboy rugby in Pietermaritzburg, and indeed, South Africa.

== History ==
James Mervyn Nicholson (the "Skonk" nickname came later) was born in Underberg, Natal, on 6 February 1917, and grew up on the family farm in that district. In due course, he was sent to the Durban Preparatory High School (DPHS) in Durban, from whence he proceeded to the Durban High School (DHS). His father was a great friend of the legendary DHS Head Master, Mr AS "Madevu" Langley, and so young Mervyn (as he was then called) was sent to DHS, rather than to Maritzburg College, which was also a family school, but the fierce-yet-friendly rival institution of the Durban school. He enjoyed a remarkably successful stint at DHS, and matriculated in 1935 as Head Prefect, captain of both the First XV and the First XI, captain of the Natal Schools' XV, and Senior Cadet Officer. It was as a young standard six (grade 8) boarder at DHS that he earned his famous nickname of "Skonk": the then Head Prefect, M Bennett, recognised young Nicholson's spirited nature, referring to him as "Skonkwaan", which was the name of an ox on the family farm, meaning (in isiZulu) "tent-peg". This was later shortened to "Skonk".

Having completed his studies at the erstwhile Natal University College (NUC) in Pietermaritzburg (now the University of KwaZulu-Natal), Nicholson started out his academic teaching career at his alma mater, DHS, immediately before the Second World War broke out. During the war, he served as an instructor (sergeant-major), before being demobilised out of the SA Army in 1944 due to injury. Much to the disappointment of the redoubtable Head Master of DHS, Col AC "Betsy" Martin MC, Nicholson was sent by the Natal Education authorities to Maritzburg College (which is known simply as "College"), where he taught Geography and coached the 1st XV rugby team from 1948 to 1982. Indeed, in 1944 the youthful Nicholson found himself the subject of a heated dispute between Col Martin and the equally pugnacious Headmaster of College, Mr JW "John-Willie" Hudson, who also wanted to enjoy the services of the talented young master. Mr Hudson ultimately prevailed, as was his wont.

Up until his death, Nicholson still served Maritzburg College and could each day be seen making his way slowly to the school in one of his two 1960s Ford Valiants, invariably with his daughter, Diana, alongside him in the front seat.

Under his leadership, Maritzburg College came to be one of the sporting powerhouses of South Africa, producing 14 unbeaten First XVs and countless Natal and SA Schools' players during his 35 seasons at the helm.

== Coaching ==
Nicholson coached numerous players, many of whom have played or are playing in international or national rugby sides. The names of these players include Keith Oxlee, Brian Irvine (captain of the Junior Springboks), Ormond Taylor and Andy van der Watt, and, since his official retirement, Joel Stransky, Jeremy Thomson, Pieter Dixon and Butch James.

Near the Kent Pavilion at Maritzburg College, overlooking the school's main rugby field, Goldstone's, stands the Nicholson Arch, erected in 1982 following Nicholson's retirement. A long-standing tradition at the school involves members of the First XV touching the arch as they enter the field, in tribute to Nicholson's contribution to rugby at the college.

Nicholson co-authored a book with Tony Wiblin, detailing the complex and often turbulent history of Maritzburg College and its rugby, entitled Jimeloyo-Ji (which is the College war-cry).

== Later life and death ==
In the company of many of his friends, Nicholson celebrated his 90th birthday on 6 February 2007. Nicholson's guests of honour included Ian McIntosh (the former coach of the Sharks & Springboks) and Josie Nel, the 99-year-old widow of Philip Nel, captain of the 1937 Springboks.

On 6 February 2011, Nicholson celebrated his 94th birthday with his family. He died on 27 February, after a short period of illness.

== See also ==
- Izak Van Heerden, another coach from Durban High School.
