= Andy van der Watt =

South African rugby union player

- Full name: Andrew Edward van der Watt
- Born: 10 October 1946 Krugersdorp, South Africa
- Died: 19 January 2025 (aged 78) KwaZulu-Natal, South Africa
- School: Maritzburg College

Rugby union career
- Position: Wing three–quarter
Provincial / State sides
Years	Team	Apps	(Points)
- Western Province
International career
Years	Team	Apps	(Points)
1969–70	South Africa	3	(0)

Andrew Edward van der Watt (10 October 1946 – 19 January 2025) was a South African international rugby union player.

== Early life ==
Born in Krugersdorp, van der Watt attended Maritzburg College and made their first XV at age 15, playing under Skonk Nicholson. He was a Natal Schools representative and also excelled in athletics, equalling a national under 19 record when he ran the 100 yards in 9.7 seconds. After finishing school, van der Watt won Western Province 100 metres and 200 metres sprinting titles. He had a personal best in the 100 metres of 10.4 seconds.

== Rugby career ==
A wing three–quarter, van der Watt played rugby at the Air Force Gymnasium in Valhalla alongside Frik du Preez during his military training, before continuing with rugby at Stellenbosch University. He had success against the touring 1969 Wallabies, with two tries for Western Province and a hat–trick for the South African under 23s (Gazelles). This earned him a Springboks call up for their 1969–70 tour of Britain and Ireland, where he played in three of the four Test matches, amongst a total of 17 appearances. He was recalled for the 1971 tour of Australia as a replacement, but didn't feature in any of the internationals.

== Teaching ==
A schoolmaster at Hilton College for many years, van der Watt taught physical education and became head of the Afrikaans department. He coached several future Springboks including Gary Teichmann while he had charge of their first XV.

== See also ==
- List of South Africa national rugby union players
