= Warren Lewis (disambiguation) =

Warren Lewis (1895–1973) was an Irish historian and British Army officer, and the brother of author C. S. Lewis

Warren Lewis may also refer to:

- Warren Lewis (soccer, born 1971), former South African association football player
- Warren Lewis (screenwriter), American film producer and screenwriter
- Warren Harmon Lewis (1870–1964), American biologist
- Warren K. Lewis (1882–1975), American chemical engineer
- Warren Lewis (Australian footballer) (1923–1988), Australian rules footballer
- Warren Lewis (ice hockey), American ice hockey player
