= Stephen Saad =

South African Lebanese billionaire businessman (born 1964)

- Born: Stephen Bradley Saad; June 1964 (age 61); Durban, South Africa
- Education: Durban High School
- Alma mater: University of Natal
- Occupation: Businessman

Stephen Bradley Saad (born June 1964) is a South African billionaire businessman, who is the founder and chief executive of Aspen Pharmacare (JSE: APN), the largest producer of generic medicines in Africa.

== Early life ==
Stephen Bradley Saad was born in June 1964 to Lebanese parents, and raised in Durban, South Africa. He attended the Durban High School in Durban. He graduated from the University of Natal, where he received a Bachelor of Commerce. He played rugby in Ireland and studied to become a chartered accountant.

== Career ==
He started his career at Quickmed, a prescription drug distribution company in black townships during apartheid. At the age of twenty-nine, he sold his share in Covan Zurich for US$3 million, thus becoming a millionaire.

In 1997, together with Gus Attridge, he co-founded Aspen Pharmacare, a public company traded on the Johannesburg Stock Exchange. It has become the largest producer of generic medicines on the African continent. He serves as its chief executive and Gus Attridge as its deputy chief executive, and serves on its board of directors. In 2011, he was worth US$640 million, becoming one of Africa's 40 richest people. His stock portfolio went up 75% in 2013. He is now worth US$1.4 billion. In October 2016, He won the Entrepreneur of the Year award at the All Africa Business Leaders Awards gala.

Additionally, he chairs the Sharks, a rugby union club in Durban. He also sits on the board of trustees of his alma mater, the Durban High School. In 2014, he was awarded an honorary doctorate from Nelson Mandela Metropolitan University for the positive role of Aspen in the city of Port Elizabeth

== Personal life ==
He resides in Durban and spends time at his private reserve in the Sabi Sand Game Reserve near the Kruger National Park. He is married with four daughters.
