= Lympne Castle =

Castle in Kent, England

Coordinates: 51°4′19.98″N 1°1′25.04″E

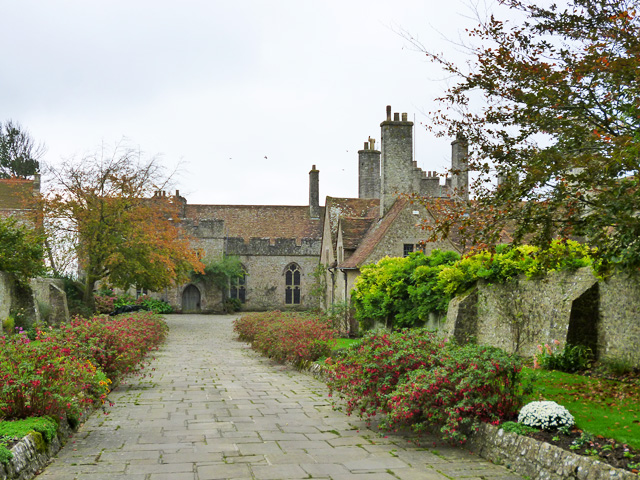
Lympne Castle in 2014.

Lympne Castle is a medieval castle in England that is located in the village of Lympne in Kent, above Romney Marsh. It is 18,862 square feet (1,752.3 m^{2}) in size and is a Grade I listed property, described as a fortified manor house. After the Reformation, the castle was sometimes referred to as Court Lodge.

== History ==
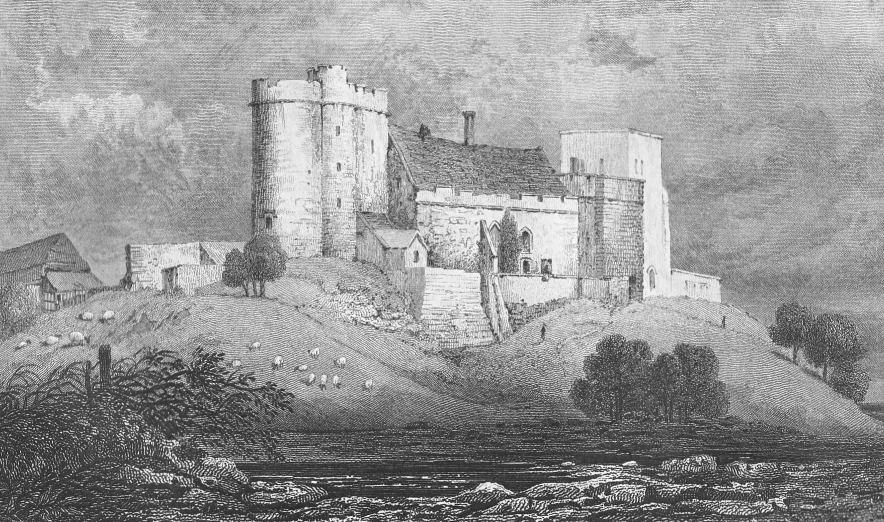
The castle as it appeared around 1830. Extensive renovations and additions were carried out later.

The castle was built close to the former Roman Saxon Shore fort of Portus Lemanis, sometimes known as Stutfall Castle, on the site of Lympne Abbey. The first castle on the site was erected in the 1080s for the Archdeacons of Canterbury. It was rebuilt in the 1360s and expanded. After that work, the structure included a tower at each end.

Additions were made in the 15th and 19th centuries. The last addition was by Robert Lorimer, who worked on the property during 1907 and 1911–12.

Until 1860, the property was the residence of the Archdeacon of Canterbury. It was then used as a farmhouse but was in disrepair by the early 1900s. The property was purchased by F.J. Tennant in 1906. The restoration of medieval aspects by Lorimer was complemented by the addition of the West Wing. The East Wing was added in 1918 for then-owner Henry Beecham.

By the end of World War II, the castle was in poor condition because it was used by the army. A series of restorations and modifications were made starting in 1945.

== Modern usage ==
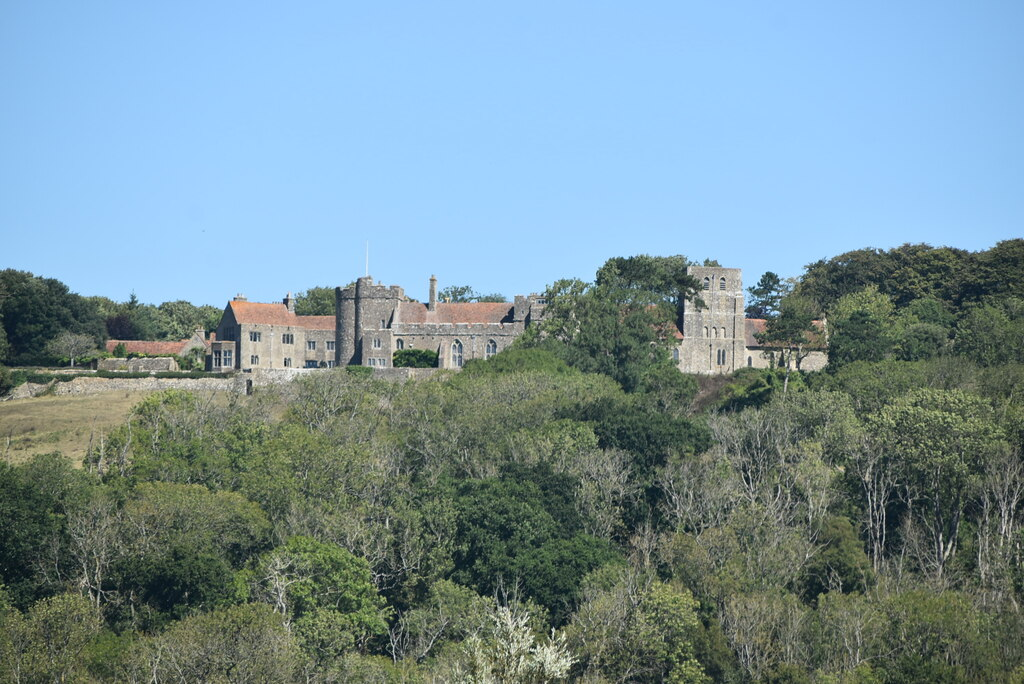
View of the castle in 2020.

In September 1978, Paul McCartney's Wings recorded sessions at Lympne Castle for their 1979 album Back to the Egg.

By the time the property was listed for sale in summer 2021, it was described as containing self-catering accommodations and a restaurant, in addition to the castle. It was also being used for corporate events and weddings. The castle was not generally open to the public.

The castle was sold in February 2023; the new owners are Canadian – Ann Kaplan Mulholland and her husband, Stephen Mulholland. They are refurbishing the castle and continue to run it as a wedding and event venue.
