= International School Eindhoven =

International School of Eindhoven(ISE)
- Oirschotsedijk 14b Eindhoven, Netherlands

Information
- Type: Coeducational
- Motto: Unity in diversity and More than a school
- Established: 1974
- Director: Boris Prickarts
- Faculty: Approx. 100
- Enrollment: Approx. 1200
- Affiliations: CIS; NEASC
- Website: https://www.isecampus.nl/Flex/Site/Page.aspx?PageID=&Lang=

The International School Eindhoven (ISE), formerly the International Secondary School of Eindhoven (ISSE), is an international school situated in the northern part of Eindhoven.

The current school (ISE) has merged itself with the primary division (RIS), therefore coming under one branch the ISE (International School Eindhoven). As of March 2026, the ISE is located mainly on the Oirschotsedijk campus. The school is located towards the outskirts of Eindhoven, near the Eindhoven Airport. The campus is based on a former military base, De Constant Rebecque Kazerne.

== Information ==
The International School Eindhoven is an English-based International School in Eindhoven, Netherlands, open to students of various ages. It consists of a primary English department, a primary Dutch department and an English secondary department. It is accredited by the Council of International Schools and the New England Association of Schools and Colleges. It currently has more than 1200 students enrolled, coming from various nationalities worldwide. The primary Dutch department was moved to a separate campus at the start of the 2024 school year due to space issues. This decision caused a lot of backlash among the parents of the affected children.

=== History ===
ISE traces its history to the International School, founded in 1965 for primary education, and to a Philips-led initiative to deliver core secondary education in English-medium at a pre-existing school from 1974. The first school features in Episode 9 of the 1977 BBC series The Age of Uncertainty, in which honoured economist John Kenneth Galbraith describes it as a product of corporate power designed to protect the dominant institution of its society, noting "English is to the modern corporation as Latin was to the medieval church".

The Philips International School renamed Regional International School (RIS) in 1975, subsequently adding other language streams such as French and German. In contrast, leaders of the secondary education expanded the scope of English lessons and relocated to form a semi-autonomous International Secondary School Eindhoven (ISSE) in 1986. In 2001 the ISSE moved again to a site 30% larger at Venetiestraat 43, Eindhoven.

Since 1982 the school has provided education up to International Baccalaureate's Diploma Programme. A successful RIS-ISSE merger started in 2007 and concluded in 2012 with current ISE branding.

=== Curriculum ===
The ISE offers the International Baccalaureate's Middle Years Programme (MYP) and the Diploma Programme (DP). There are five year groups in the Middle Years Programme and two years in Diploma Programme. English is the main language used throughout the school.

If MYP students have little experience with English, they may participate in an English Language Learning (ELL) course, which aims to improve the student's knowledge of English to a level that is sufficient to allow the student to be able to communicate in other classes. During the time a student is in the ELL, he/she may be withdrawn from regular classes to focus on improving his/her English skills.

As part of the MYP, students are required to follow the curriculum set out by the International Baccalaureate. The five areas of interaction of the MYP are the students' main focus for all students, and students have to fulfill a community and service program as part of the curriculum. In the fifth year of the MYP, students are asked to complete 50 hours of community and service as a compulsory subject in order to acquire a certificate, as well as the completion of a Personal Project.

In the DP years, Theory of Knowledge (TOK), Creativity, Action, Service (CAS) and Extended Essay (EE) are critical areas which the students must focus on in tandem with regular academic studies.

Although the main language used within the school is English, the school also offers Spanish and French as secondary languages within the MYP years. Dutch is a compulsory subject, and is offered at three levels: Foundation, Secondary Language and Primary Language. Later on in the Diploma Programme, students may choose other languages as their primary language instead of English. In addition, secondary language curriculum is left entirely open, with self-study arrangements available for all IB language courses outside of English, Dutch, Spanish, and French.

The ISE offers two artistic courses in the MYP years: Performing Arts/Music Classes and Visual Arts. Later on in the DP, only the Visual Arts course is offered.

Physical Education is compulsory for all students except for students in the Diploma Programme.

=== Extracurricular activities ===
The school organizes numerous annual excursions for its students. An annual skiing trip to Austria or Switzerland is available to certain students during "Activities Week". Students also get the opportunity for a touristic London Trip. Furthermore, the school also engages in class trips for each individual grade, usually at the beginning or end of the school year. These trips are designed to encourage team building and other social skills between staff and students. Workshops for parents are also offered.

After school activities include various clubs, on topics such as MUN, Visual Arts, Science, Math, and Student Politics, as well as several sports. The extra curricular sports activities and regular participation in sports tournaments have gained the school a good reputation in Basketball, Softball, Football and Volleyball. It also enters NECIS tournaments on all four categories on an annual basis. The ISE also has several FIRST LEGO League teams.

The ISE has participated in the Model United Nations (MUN) since the 1980s, and has won the "Best Delegation Award" on many occasions. Alongside hosting its own one-day annual conference (MUNISE), the school is also involved with two other school's MUN conferences: Model United Nations International School of The Hague (MUNISH) and The Hague International Model United Nations (THIMUN).

=== Facilities ===
The area of the entire site is around 17,000m^{2} with a spacious outdoor recreational area which includes an open grass field and an artificial grass football field. The area within the buildings totals at approximately 7,000m^{2}. The majority of buildings are connected by an underground tunnel, which holds the school library, multimedia center, drama theater, and study areas. The secondary department features over 30 classrooms, of which four are science and experimental laboratories, two are visual arts workrooms, and one a design technology workroom. There are also two computer laboratories and one music room. A large multi-purpose hall including a canteen is present which can be transformed into a theatrical stage for performances or special events. The campus also features four full-sized gym halls, with three being above and one underground.

The school has arranged bus services via Hermes for students to travel from the city center to the campus.

== Merging with the RIS ==
Discussions on merging the International Secondary School of Eindhoven and the Regional International School began as early as 2006. Currently, the primary department is in a separate building from the secondary department. The confirmation of the merger in 2009 announced that the new school shall merge both the secondary department and the primary department under the name International School of Eindhoven. The merging process was completed in 2013 when both the RIS and the ISSE moved to the Oirschotsedijk.
