= Maritzburg College =

Location
- 51 College Road, Pelham; Pietermaritzburg, KwaZulu-Natal; South Africa; 29°37′00″S 30°22′55″E

Information
- School type: All-boys semi-private school
- Motto: Pro Aris et Focis (For Hearth and Home)
- Established: 1863; 163 years ago
- Locale: Urban Campus
- School district: District 9
- Chairman: IS Colenbrander (since 2022)
- Headmaster: Alan Redfern (since 2025)
- Exam board: KZN
- Teaching staff: 100 full-time
- Grades: 8 – 12 (Forms 2 – 6)
- Gender: Male
- Age: 14 to 18
- Enrollment: 1,260
- Student to teacher ratio: 12:1
- Language: English
- Schedule: 07:30 – 14:00
- Area: 25 hectares (62 acres)
- Houses: Boarding Houses: 5; Dayboy houses: 10
- Colours: Red, black, white
- Rivals: Durban High School; Hilton College; Kearsney College; King Edward VII School; Michaelhouse; Pretoria Boys High School; St. Charles College
- Tuition: Day Scholar: R74 100 p/a (grade 9-12); R79 200 p/a (grade 8); Boarding: R109 200 p/a (grade 9-12); R114 500 p/a (grade 8)
- Feeder schools: Merchiston Preparatory School
- Alumni: Old Collegians ("OCs")
- Website: maritzburgcollege.co.za

Maritzburg College is a semi-private English-medium high school for boys situated in the city of Pietermaritzburg in the KwaZulu-Natal province of South Africa. Founded in 1863, it is the oldest boys' high school in KwaZulu-Natal, and one of the oldest schools in South Africa. As of December 2024 it is attended by 1,260 students, of whom approximately 495 are boarders.

Known in the main for its rugby and traditional ethos, Maritzburg College also attains high results in the annual National Senior Certificate results. Since the start of the 21^{st} century, it has added cultural and pastoral programmes, including a jazz band and inter-house programme. With (amongst others) 28 rugby teams, 22 cricket teams, 19 basketball teams, and 18 hockey teams, the school offers a long-established sporting programme. In late 2024, alumni Andile Simelane (cricket) and Sheldon de Klerk (bodybuilding) earned national colours - in doing so, becoming the school's 338th and 339th sporting internationals. Its brother school is Pretoria Boys High School, sharing many cultural and sports exchanges for the past 54 years.

== History ==
=== Victorian origins ===
RD Clark (eighth from the right) poses with boys and colleagues shortly after taking occupation of the newly built "Main Building", 1888.

Maritzburg College was founded as the Pietermaritzburg High School in 1863, by William Calder, in a carpenter's shop in what is today Langalibalele Street, to accommodate the influx of children arriving at the new city of Pietermaritzburg and its surrounding farmlands in the KwaZulu-Natal Midlands. As the school – commonly known as College – swelled, "the best-trained [architect] in the Colony", PM Dudgeon, was commissioned to design – on the then outskirts of the city – a larger classroom and boarding block, which was completed in 1888. This later became known as Clark House, honouring the school's third headmaster, RD Clark (MA (Oxon)). He is often referred to as the Father of College.

Clark House carries the KwaZulu-Natal provincial heritage authorities' seal certifying it as a heritage landmark. A similar honour was bestowed on the school's Victoria Hall, the building of which commenced in 1897 (Queen Victoria's diamond jubilee year). During the Second Boer War, it served as a British Army hospital from November 1899 until July 1900.

=== Headmasters ===
Since the school's foundation in 1863, the following 15 men have held the post of headmaster of Maritzburg College:

- Calder, William, (Edinburgh Training College), 1863-1867
- Forder, James, BA (Cantab), 1868-1878
- Clark, Robert D, MA (Oxon), 1879-1902
- Barns, Ernest W ('Pixie'), MA (London), 1902-1925
- Pape, Septimus W, MA (Oxon), 1926-1937
- Snow, John H ('Froggy'), BA Hons (London), 1937-1941
- Hudson, John W ('John-Willie'), BA (NUC), 1941-1953
- Fuller, Raymond E ('Bones'), BA, 1954-1965 *
- Commons, Hector J, MA (South Africa), 1966-1977 *
- Olivier, Keith, BA UED (Natal), 1978-1985 *
- Forde, Dr R Dudley, MA (Natal), PhD (UNISA), 1986-1992
- Elliott, Kenneth P, BA BEd (Natal), 1992-2002 *
- Pearson, Clive E, BA UED (Rhodes), 2003-2005
- Jury, D Ronald, BSc UED (Natal), 2006-2012
- Luman, Dr Christopher J, MEd, PhD (UNISA) BA HDE (UCT) PGDip Sport Management (Massey), 2013-2025
- Redfern, Alan 2025-

== School Crest, Colours and Motto ==
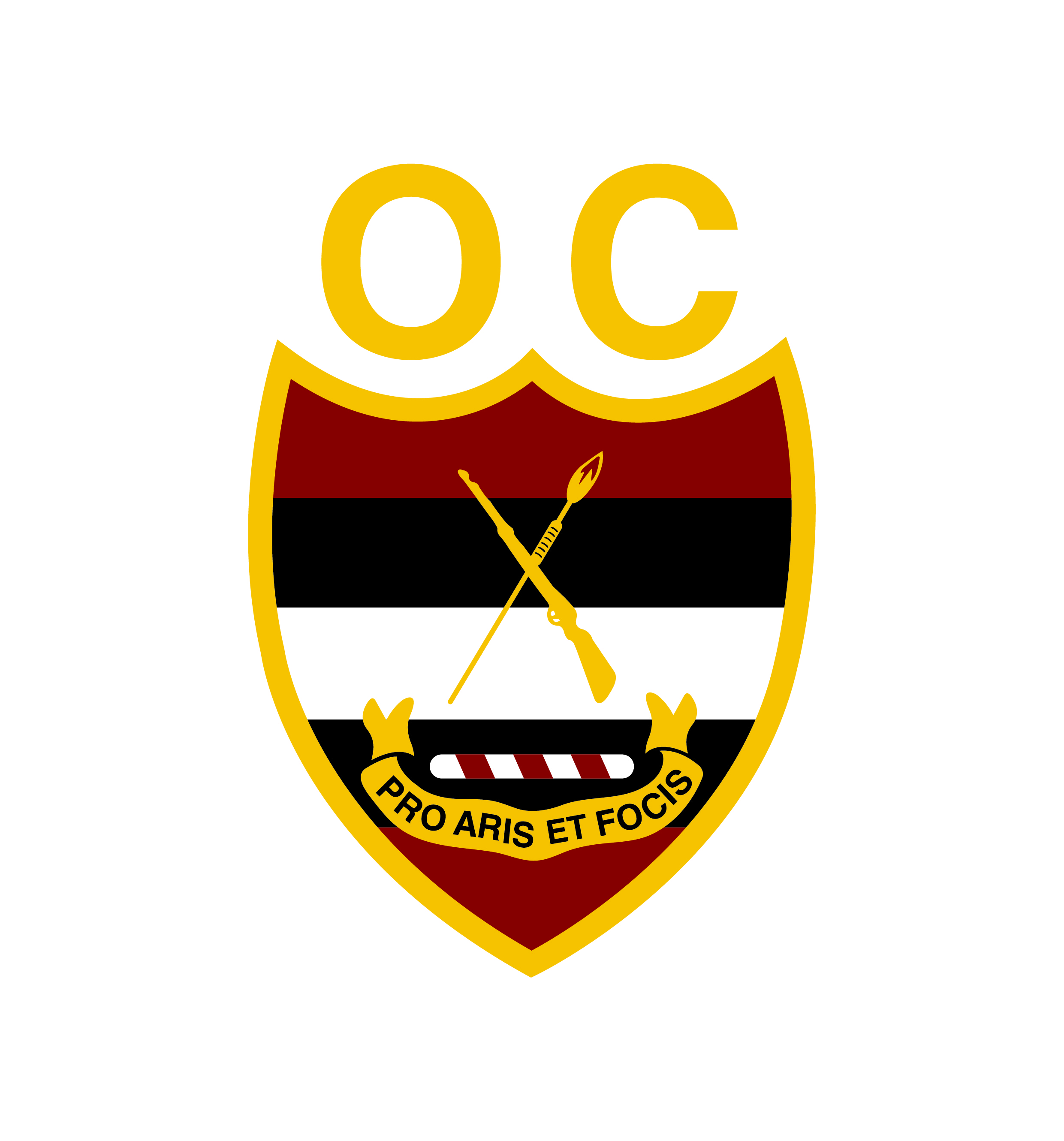
Badge of the Maritzburg College Old Boys' Association, which was founded in 1897

The school crest is a red shield with a crossed carbine and assegai (a traditional Zulu weapon), over the Latin scroll bearing Pro Aris et Focis (For Hearth and Home).

The College colours of red, black and white were first introduced in 1891 by EJ Holgate, the captain of the school's football team. A short while later, Mr RD Clark instituted the school motto (derived from the Latin inscription he composed for the Colonial War Memorial, now in the foyer of Clark House) and the badge of carbine-and-assegai, both of which were initially connected more with the school's Old Boys' Association than the school. An ardent Victorian, Mr Clark was especially proud that 11 of his young school's sons had died in the valiant (as he saw them) colonial struggles 'for hearth and home' (the motto) – hence the school's martial insignia too. Notably, seven alumni had died at the bloody Battle of Isandlwana. Two of the school's most prized artefacts are assegais that had been retrieved from the battlefield in June 1879; these were presented to the school in 2018 and 2022, respectively.

Debate has taken place as to why Holgate chose the combination of red, black and white for the school's colours. A popular belief is that they highlight the various skirmishes, battles and wars between the British and the Zulu that took place in the late 19th century (especially Isandlwana). The colours are said to represent the warring parties (white and black) and the blood that was shed between them (red).

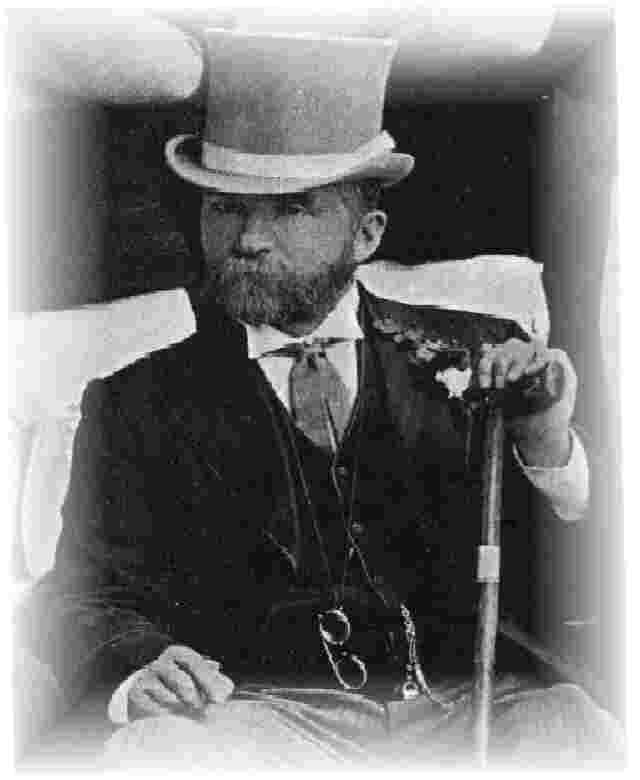
Mr RD Clark (MA (Oxon)) – 'the Father of Maritzburg College'

== Houses ==
Although Maritzburg College operated as a boarding school soon after its foundation in 1863, the school's system of sports Houses was not introduced until 1902. Initially, a system of four Houses was introduced. A fifth House – Nathan House – was added in 1910. The old Houses were as follows:

- Clark's, named after the third headmaster, RD Clark (headmaster 1879–1902)
- Stalker's, named after Clark's long-serving senior assistant master, Rev John D Stalker (staff 1881–1902)
- Langley's, named after Stalker's successor, AS Madevu Langley (staff 1897–1909)
- Oxland's, named after an early Games Master at the school, W Oxland (staff 1901–1908)
- Sir Matthew Nathan House – or simply Nathan's – , after the last governor of Natal, Sir Matthew Nathan

The old House system of five sporting Houses was replaced in 2014 with 10 new so-called 'day' Houses. Each of these meets every morning, has about 130 boys, and form the basis of the school's strong mentoring programme. The Houses are now as follows:

- Calder's, named after the first headmaster, William Calder
- Forder's, named after the second headmaster, James Forder
- Barns', named after the fourth headmaster, Ernest Barns
- Pape's, named after the fifth headmaster, Septimus Pape
- Snow's, named after the sixth headmaster, John Snow
- Fuller's, named after the eighth headmaster, Raymond Fuller
- Commons', named after the ninth headmaster, Hector Commons
- Lamond's, named after former Vice Principal, SE Lamond (staff 1911–1950)
- Nicholson's, named after former Deputy Headmaster and distinguished rugby coach, JM Skonk Nicholson (staff 1944–1982)
- Strachan's, named after former Deputy Headmaster, JR 'Cabbage' Strachan (staff 1952–1978)

The annual inter-house competition among the 10 Houses includes trials in more than 25 academic, sports, cultural and community-based-events for the Forder Cup for Champion House.

The system of day or sporting Houses is not to be confused with the school's five boarding Houses. To begin with, the sporting and boarding Houses were linked, with the boarders being allocated to Clark's and Langley's sporting Houses (and later Nathan's), and the dayboys to Stalker's and Oxland's.

But, since the headmastership of Mr Snow (headmaster 1937–1941), all boys have been allocated randomly to the sports Houses. Thus, a boarder in the Clark House might these days find himself assigned to Nicholson's day House.

The school's five boarding Houses are:

- Nathan House: opened in 1910 and the home of the school's approximately 100 grade 8 (Form 2) boarders
- Clark House: home to about 100 boys in Forms 3-5
- Hudson House: opened in 1958 and home to about 130 boys in Forms 3-5
- Elliott House: opened in 1998 and home to about 80 Form 6 boarders (originally called College House until 2013)
- Shepstone House: purchased from the Shepstone family on behalf of the school in 1919 and used for many years as the school's sanatorium and for staff housing. The fifth boarding house, "New" Shepstone House, next door to the old building, was designed by Charles Taylor, the 1984 head prefect, and opened in September 2018. It houses up to 90 boarders in grades 9 to 11.

== Academic Standards ==
The school employs 105 teachers on its academic staff - in addition to scores of administrative, estates, additional sports and other support staff. The subjects offered at grade 12 level include Accounting, Afrikaans, Agricultural Sciences, Business Studies, Computer Applications & Technology (CAT), Dramatic Arts, Economics, English, Geography, Engineering & Graphic Design (EGD), History, Information Technology (IT), Life Sciences, Life Orientation, Mathematics, Mathematical Literacy, Ap maths, Music, Physical Science, Visual Arts and IsiZulu.

Despite its size and its customary prowess on the sports field, Maritzburg College's academic standards also are traditionally strong. In the early 21st century, the school has continued to boast results that are amongst the best for a top-tier school in the country. In November 2021, all 270 of its grade 12 pupils passed the National Senior Certificate, with 89% achieving a university entrance qualification, and 15 boys each earning seven distinctions.

== Privileges, Traditions and Discipline ==
One of the school's distinct features is its hierarchical system, which is underpinned by a long-established set of privileges and duties.

In September 2020, Maritzburg College officially released its policy document titled 'College Culture' - aimed at outlining and preserving What it means to be a Maritzburg College boy, but ensuring that these practices subscribe to laws, norms and expectations. This document included a College Credo, which requires each boy, at the start of his career at the school, to publicly proclaim his allegiance via the Credo - including his pledge to live out the school's Core Values, to always remain loyal and true to my school, and to live out the school's Core Traditions.

Well-known duties required of a junior include team-testing (the rote-learning of school teams, etc.), the requirement for him to sprint or jog in various parts of the school, gamesroom (the daily sorting out of the sports equipment before practices by all 2^{nd} Formers) and waiting-at-doors. General school traditions include the wearing by all boys of straw boaters (known as bashers), which are hurled into the air at First XV rugby matches. Also, when a junior is addressing a more senior boy, he must say the word please at the end of sentences.

Because of its possibly contentious nature, the hierarchical system of privileges that underpins the school's ethos is monitored by the school's executive committee, in consultation with the Old Boys' Association.

Maritzburg College's structure of traditions and concepts date to similar styles found in traditional British boarding schools. It is perhaps one of the few schools in South Africa where this structure is retained largely to its original extent.

However, a number of its more vigorous customs have long-since been done away with – including wooden spoon (a practice requiring the consumption by Form 5 boarders of mouldy food, especially prepared for them by the departing 6^{th} Formers), appie stakes (when, again, Form 5 boarders were used as jockeys by their outgoing 6^{th} Form counterparts, invariably with painful consequences), domp (a rough form of backyard rugby that was played especially when the fields were muddy), tables (the serving of a 2^{nd} Form boarder of his seniors at meal-times), the annual new boys’ concert, and the regular caning of boys by prefects and masters. Running (the carrying out of any errands by 2^{nd} Form boys for prefects) and fagging (a watered-down version of the old Victorian custom) were done away with in 2020.

== Sport ==
The first recorded sports match played by the Pietermaritzburg High School was a cricket match held in the Market Square on 6 May 1865 against the Red Rover Cricket Club. The High School won the first match – "notwithstanding the primitive conditions under which it must have been played".

The first inter-schools cricket and rugby matches were both played against the Deutsche Schule Hermannsburg, on 6 October 1870, with the then High School (now Maritzburg College) winning both fixtures. The cricket match was played in the morning on the Camp Grounds and the rugby match was played in the afternoon on the Pietermaritzburg market square.

Maritzburg College students take part in a wide variety of sports, including rugby, cricket, canoeing, hockey, athletics, swimming, water polo, tennis, shooting, football (soccer), basketball, cross-country, squash, e-sports and golf.

The school has fixtures against its rival schools. Records show College to be the strongest sporting school in the province in sports such as rugby, cricket, canoeing, polo, polocrosse, and hockey.

The Victoria Hall. The building was completed in 1899 and was used as a military hospital by the British authorities during the Boer War

The school's search for greater sporting competition has taken it beyond the province's borders, and each year in winter it has derby days against Afrikaanse Hoër Seunskool (known as Affies) and Pretoria Boys High School in Gauteng, in which up to 800 College boys take part.

From 1944 until 1982, the school enjoyed the services of the noted geography master and schoolboy rugby coach, the late Mr Skonk Nicholson, whose name is iconic with Maritzburg College and schoolboy rugby, and who is well respected in the South African rugby community as having nurtured many Collegians to national and international sporting fame. In his 35 seasons in charge of the First XV (rugby), his teams established a playing record of Played 504, Won 403, Drew 49 and Lost 52.

Amongst its many notable Old Boys (known as Old Collegians), it can count (As of December 2024) 339 sporting internationals, including 36 Old Collegians who have captained international sporting sides. In addition, Kevin Pietersen captained the England cricket team, Matthew Hawkins captained the USA rugby sevens team and Darian Townsend captained the USA swimming team. Four Old Collegians attended the 2004 Olympic Games, with Darian Townsend winning a gold medal as part of the world record-setting SA 4 x 100 freestyle team, and Donovan Cech winning a bronze medal in the rowing; six attended the 2008 Olympics in Beijing, and four attended the 2012 Olympics in London. Six Old Collegians, across hockey, cycling, and swimming, were included in the SA team competing in the 2018 Commonwealth Games held on the Gold Coast, Australia.

The most recent additions (as at December 2024) to the school's international honours boards in the Kent Pavilion, overlooking Goldstone's field, are Andile Simelane (cricket) and Sheldon de Klerk (bodybuilding).

Saturdays during the summer months can often yield 30 cricket teams (an under 14P XI has occasionally been produced), and up to 29 rugby teams and 21 hockey teams during winter.

== Maritzburg College Old Boys' Association (MCOBA) ==
The MCOBA was founded on January 11, 1897, in the Supper Room of the town Pietermaritzburg hall. The meeting was presided over by the Attorney-General of Natal, Henry Bale (Dux 1870), with Ernest Holgate as secretary. However, the school's history acknowledges that "most of the talking was done by Mr Clark."

The gathering each year of Old Collegians at the various Reunion Weekend events hosted by the school and local sports clubs (including alumni basketball, football, golf, padel and lawn bowls) is a highlight on the school calendar, and culminates with the First XV rugby match on the main field, Goldstone's.

== Old Collegians ==
=== Prominent Old Collegians (OCs) ===
Maritzburg College has produced many Old Boys who have distinguished themselves.

The details of the prominent (non-sporting) OCs are displayed on the 'honoris causa' honours board in the Victoria Hall.

Amongst the names on display are a pre-eminent English author, two bishops and 13 South African senators; a Chief Justice of old Natal, three Attorneys General and 10 judges (including a former member of the Supreme Court of Appeal in Bloemfontein); the general officers commanding the Rhodesian Army and the South African Air Force; five other generals, two admirals and the Commissioner of the British South Africa Police (BSAP) in the former Rhodesia; eight Officers Commanding of the Natal Carbineers alone; 23 Rhodes scholars and scores of academics of distinction, including professors at Harvard and Yale; two Chancellors of the University of Natal and three Directors of Education; numerous Members of Parliament; two Emmy Award-winning cameramen and a winner of the Polar Medal; as well as the founder of Rand Merchant Bank and subsequent CEO of FirstRand Bank and the recently retired CEO of Nedbank.

The most recent (2020-2024) names added to the 'honoris causa' honours board are Major Hugh Gordon NOURSE (RE) (1899), Military Cross; Lt Croye Rothes PITHEY (RFC) (1908), Distinguished Flying Cross and Bar; Francois Adrianus RODGERS (1980), Member of Parliament, Provincial Chairman of the Democratic Alliance; Edmund BOURKE (c1864), Mayor of Pretoria; Dale Anson HANCOCK (1988), Emmy Award-winning filmmaker; and Sgt-Maj (retd.) Michael Steven BOND (1978), Member of Parliament.

The details of the prominent sporting OCs are displayed on an honours board in the Kent Pavilion.

As already mentioned, College has produced locally and internationally acclaimed sportsmen, with a tally of 339 international sportsmen and officials to date, and as such is amongst the most produced by a single South African school. (Note: It is difficult to verify the popular claim that Maritzburg College has produced the most out of all schools in South Africa, but informal enquiries by a member of the school's Archives Committee at notable schools such as Grey College, King Edward VII School, Pretoria Boys High School and the Diocesan College (Bishops) confirm that Maritzburg College's tally was, as at April 2013, higher than the totals of the schools mentioned.)

Amongst that number are 33 SA captains, 3 overseas captains, 10 captains of polo alone, a former Mr USA (bodybuilding), 6 2008 Olympians, 4 2012 Olympians, and the "man who won the 2005 Ashes" for England, Kevin Pietersen. Jesse Kriel represented the Rugby World Cup-winning Springboks in 2019 and 2023, and 'master blaster' David Miller is a world record-holding exponent of limited overs cricket. Another well-known sportsman produced by the school is Andy Birkett, who since he matriculated at the end of 2008 has emerged as one of the world's pre-eminent marathon canoeists, having won the Dusi Canoe Marathon 13 times in the last 14 years and the world canoeing marathon title in 2022.

In addition to its 305 international sportsmen, a further 34 Old Collegians have officiated at an international level in sport - including Rugby World Cup rugby referee Craig Joubert, former Test (cricket) umpire Dave Orchard and numerous managers and coaches. The most recent is Donovan Wewege - the manager of the SA team at the 2024 ICF Canoe Polo World Cup.

=== Roll of Honour ===
The school's Roll of Honour lists the names of 3 teachers and 265 former scholars (as at December 2024) who have given their lives in wars since the first Old Collegian casualty fell in 1873 (1863 foundation scholar, Trooper Robert Erskine, who was killed in a skirmish with the Hlubi at Bushman's River Pass). All of their names are displayed on College's numerous war memorials and honours boards, including precisely 100 on the First World War Memorial in front of Clark House and 133 on the honours board in the school chapel that records the names of Old Collegians who died in the Second World War. The most Old Collegians killed in single actions are 11 at the Battle of Delville Wood from 14 to 20 July 1916 and seven at both the famous Battle of Isandlwana (at which over 1,300 British and colonial troops were slaughtered by the Zulus during the Zulu War – a memorial in honour of those fallen Old Boys was unveiled on the battlefield in 1969, on the 90th anniversary of that battle); and at Gelib in Italian Somaliland in 1941, during the infamous 'White Flag Incident' that claimed the lives of 13 Royal Natal Carbineers. A total of 27 alumni died at the Battle of the Somme, which was fought between July and December 1916. Three additional names to the school's war memorial commemorating its alumni killed in the South African War (1899-1902) were added on Remembrance Day 2022, and another name (that of Fl-Lt Mervyn Lascelles MORRIS (RAF)) was added in December 2024 to the school's Second World War roll of honour. Old Collegians have also earned a considerable tally of decorations and awards, especially during the two World Wars – the most recent award being the Distinguished Flying Cross awarded in 2012 to Fl Lt Luke Flemington, RAF.

=== Notable Old Collegians (by year of matriculation) ===
- 1870: Sir Henry Bale KCMG, dux 1870, Cabinet Minister (Natal), Chief Justice (Natal)
- 1870: Lt-Col Henry Nourse (Founder: Nourse Mines, member of Int. Olympic Committee, founder: Nourse’s Horse (SA War), first president of SA Amateur Athletic & Cycling Association, first chairman of SA Olympic Committee, president SA Lawn Tennis Association)
- 1884: Maj-Gen William Tanner CB CMG DSO MC Legion d' Honneur Croix de Guerre Ordre de Leopold, Chief of Staff: UDF, CO: 8th Inf. Brig. (British Army), CO at Battle of Delville Wood (1916)
- 1910: Cecil (Bill) Payn MM, South African national rugby player, multi-talented provincial sportsman (five sports), renowned as the Man who ran the 1922 Comrades Marathon in his rugby boots, holder of the MM
- 1911: Prof Edgar Brookes, South African senator, South African representative to the League of Nations
- 1918: Alan Paton, author of Cry, the Beloved Country and political activist
- 1921: Philip J. Nel (head prefect), captain of 'the Greatest Springboks' of 1937 - the only South African national rugby team to have won a test series against the All Blacks in New Zealand
- 1936: Lt-Gen Keith Coster ID OBE SSAS, General Officer Commanding (GOC) the Rhodesian Army, Grand Officer of the Order of the Star of South Africa
- 1938: Lt-Gen Bob Rogers DSO DFC, Officer Commanding the South African Air Force, South African national shottist whilst still at school
- 1943: Harold Strachan, liberation struggle bomber
- 1948: DJ Jackie McGlew, captain of South African national cricket team
- 1951: Rt Revd Michael Nuttall, Bishop of Natal, Elsie Ballot Scholar (University of Cambridge)
- 1952: Keith Oxlee, South Africa national rugby team player
- 1953: Dr Malcolm Forsyth, composer, Order of Canada
- 1964: Maj-Gen Ian Deetlefs SSAS PG SM JCD, Chief of Defence Reserves, South African National Defence Force
- 1967: Paul Harris (head prefect), co-founder of Rand Merchant Bank and CEO of First National Bank
- 1967: Kevin Swain, judge: Supreme Court of Appeal
- 1978: Gary Strydom, Mr USA, bodybuilding
- 1983: Michael Brown, CEO of Nedbank
- 1985: Joel Stransky, 1995 Rugby World Cup-winning South Africa national rugby team player
- 1987: Jonty Rhodes (head prefect), South African national cricket player
- 1991: Donovan Cech, South African national team rower, bronze medallist at the 2004 Olympic Games
- 1993: Rob van Vuuren, actor
- 1995: Craig Joubert, international rugby referee who officiated in the final of the 2011 Rugby World Cup
- 1997: Shaun Morgan, lead singer and guitar player of the band Seether
- 1997: Kevin Pietersen MBE, captain of the England national cricket team
- 1997: Andrew 'Butch' James, 2007 Rugby World Cup-winning South Africa national rugby team player
- 2002: Darian Townsend, Olympic gold medallist in Athens, 2004 – member of the South African 4x100m freestyle world record relay team - captain of the USA swimming team
- 2006: Lunga Shabalala, Actor & TV presenter
- 2007: David Miller, South Africa national cricket team player
- 2013: Bandile Shandu, Premier Soccer League player for Orlando Pirates
- 2012: Jesse Kriel, South Africa national rugby union team
- 2018: Ntuthuko Mchunu (head prefect), South Africa national rugby union team

== School Song ==
The Maritzburg College school song, titled the 'College Anthem,' was introduced in August 2013. It was composed by the then Director of Academics, Miss A McLoughlin, and two previous head prefects, Ryan Hosking (2011) and Jesse Filaferro (2012). Its words are as follows:

College Anthem

Through these walls, the strength that binds us, Men of courage, men of pride. Passion shared that always finds us, Bound as brothers side by side.

Chorus: Our field of gold, time and again, Ignites our hearts, both boys and men. And we’ll return from whence we roam, For the glory, for hearth and home.

Through our cries, our prayers, our laughter, Stories told for all to hear. Standing tall, both here and after, Our guide and crest, our shield and spear.

== Publications ==
The following books about Maritzburg College have been published by the school:

- 'Anecdota', Random recollections of the Maritzburg High School and College,' by RD Clark (headmaster 1879-1902), P Davis & Sons, Durban, 1908.
- 'College 1863-1963', A history of Maritzburg High School (1863-1888) and of Maritzburg College, by RW Kent, Shuter & Shooter Publishers, Pietermaritzburg, 1963.
- 'For Hearth and Home', The story of Maritzburg College, 1863-1988, by Simon Haw, Maritzburg College Publications, Pietermaritzburg, ISBN 9780620 130868, 1988.
- 'Jimeloyo-Ji!', A history of the Maritzburg College First XV, by Skonk Nicholson and Tony Wiblin, Maritzburg College Publications, Pietermaritzburg, 1990.
- 'Brothers for Life', Maritzburg College 1863-2013, by Graham Bennetts, Maritzburg College Publications, Pietermaritzburg, 2013.
- 'Old Walls, New Echoes', Maritzburg College 1986-2015, by Simon Haw, Maritzburg College Publishers, Pietermaritzburg, ISBN 9780620 660105, 2015.
