= David W. Brokensha =

South African anthropologist

David Warwick Brokensha
- Born: 23 May 1923; Durban, Union of South Africa
- Died: 15 June 2017 (aged 94); Fish Hoek, South Africa
- Partner: Bernard Riley (1954–2004; his death)

Academic background
- Education: Oxford University
- Thesis: Social Change at Larteh, Ghana (1963)

Academic work
- Discipline: Anthropologist
- Institutions: University of California, Santa Barbara

David Warwick Brokensha (23 May 1923 – 15 June 2017) was a South African anthropologist and university professor, known for his work on Indigenous development and cultures in Africa.

== Early life and education ==
Brokensha was born in Durban, Union of South Africa on 23 May 1923. His father was a lawyer (and later judge), while his mother was a nursing sister from Lancashire in England; they married in 1915. His paternal grandfather was from Cornwall and had moved to the area in 1870.

Brokensha attended Durban Preparatory High School and Durban High School, where he edited the school magazine and was secretary of the Debating Society.

He began studies at Rhodes University College, but left in 1940 to fight in World War II. Both Brokensha and his brother Paul were captured at Tobruk in 1942, and held at a work camp in Dresden until 1945. He reached the rank of Lance Corporal, and would later recount his experiences in Karen Horn's 2015 work In Enemy Hands: South Africa’s POWs in World War II . Another brother, Guy, disappeared during the war and Brokensha wrote about him in the 2016 work Guy's Story.

Brokensha returned to South Africa after the war and continued his studies at Rhodes, where he became interested in anthropology and was taught by Monica Wilson. In 1983, he wrote her obituary in the African Studies journal Africa.

In 1947, he won an Elsie Ballot scholarship to study economics at Cambridge University. However, he soon switched to study anthropology and was taught by Reo Fortune. He was awarded an MA in Social Anthropology in 1949, and transferred to Oxford University, where he passed his final examination for a BLit in 1950. In the same year, he converted to Catholicism, supported by his professors Godfrey Lienhardt and E. E. Evans-Pritchard.

== Career ==
In 1951, he joined the British Colonial Service on recommendations from Meyer Fortes and John Beattie. He was posted to Tanganyika, but considered becoming a Catholic priest. While there, he rose to the position of district commissioner. He and his partner Riley left for Southern Rhodesia in 1956, where they had found other positions.

In 1958, they left the region and Brokensha became a lecturer at University of Ghana under St. Clair Drake. His work was compiled into an urban ethnography titled Social Change at Larteh, Ghana, which served as his 1963 dissertation for his PhD from Oxford. The work was a study of the "social, environmental, and historical context" of the people living within Larteh in Ghana. It was published as a book in 1966.

In 1963, he moved to the United States and joined the Institute of International Studies at the University of California, Berkeley. At the same time, he lectured in education and sociology, and trained Peace Corps volunteers. He joined the University of California, Santa Barbara's Anthropology department in 1966. Riley eventually joined him there as a member of the Geography department and later as a lecturer in Environmental Studies.

In 1968, he visited Ghanaian and Ugandan communities with Charles J. Erasmus, their study supporting Brokensha's positive views of community development programmes. In the same year he chaired the university's Anthropology department, at a time when students protested over the decision not to rehire radical anti-grading and anti-capitalist archaeologist Bill Allen, as well as the Vietnam War. Taking a leave of absence from the university in 1970, Brokensha travelled to Kenya for fifteen months to serve as an evaluator for the Mbeere Special Rural Development Programme. It aimed to invest in infrastructure to improve income-generation. He was joined by Riley, and they worked together on two National Science Foundation-funded projects concerning ethnobotanical knowledge. They published a two-volume study in 1988 based on their experience titled The Mbeere in Kenya.

During the 1970s, Brokensha began advocating for the inclusion of Indigenous peoples in international development policy, working with Thayer Scudder and Michael M. Horowitz to form the Institute for Development Anthropology in 1976. He was appointed to UCSB's Environmental Studies Program in 1976, and later became its chair. In 1980, he received the university's top teaching award.

Brokensha retired from academia in 1989, but continued his interest in Indigenous development. At his retirement, he was presented with a Festschrift titled Social Change & Applied Anthropology: Essays in Honor of David W. Brokensha. His last academic book was a 2012 co-edited work titled Climate Change and Threatened Communities, and he co-authored his last article in 2015.

In 2007, he published a memoir titled Brokie’s Way: An Anthropologist’s Story.

== Personal life ==
Brokensha was openly gay. In June 1954, he met Bernard Riley at the Tanga Yacht Club in modern-day Tanzania. Riley had been in the British Intelligence Corps during the war, before taking up a high school teaching post in Tanga. Despite homosexuality being illegal during a large proportion of their relationship, they remained together. The couple moved to England in 1989, and in 1995 the University of California allowed Riley onto Brokensha's medical aid and pension plan as his long-term partner. They moved to Fish Hoek in 1999, and Riley died in 2004.

After suffering from chronic cardiac issues, Brokensha died on 15 June 2017 at his house in Fish Hoek, South Africa.

== Selected works ==
=== Articles ===
- "Monica Wilson 1908–82". Africa. 53 (3): 83–87. July 1983. doi:10.1017/S0001972000027595. ISSN 1750-0184.
- "Conclusion: some reflections on indigenous knowledge and climate change". Climate Change and Threatened Communities: 197–200. 2012. doi:10.3362/9781780447254.017. ISBN 978-1-85339-735-6. (with A. Peter Castro and Dan Taylor)
- "Development: Social-Anthropological Aspects". The International Encyclopedia of Social and Behavioral Sciences: 301–306. December 2015. doi:10.1016/B978-0-08-097086-8.12053-7. ISBN 9780080970875. (with A. Peter Castro)

=== Books ===
- Social Change at Larteh, Ghana. Oxford: Clarendon Press. 1966. ISBN 9780198231288.
- The Mbeere in Kenya. University Press of America. 1988. ISBN 9780819169976. (with Bernard Riley)
- The Cultural Dimension of Development: Indigenous Knowledge Systems. Intermediate Technology Publications. 1995. ISBN 9781853392641. (with Leendert Jan Slikkerveer, Dennis M. Warren, and Wim Dechering)
- Brokie's Way: An Anthropologist's Story. Fish Hoek, South Africa: Amani Press. 2007. ISBN 9780620390644.
- Climate Change and Threatened Communities: Vulnerability, Capacity, and Action. Practical Action Publishing. 2012. ISBN 9781853397356. (with A. Peter Castro and Dan Taylor)
- Guy's Story. Fish Hoek, South Africa: Amani Press. 2016. ISBN 9780620704823.
