= Ian Deetlefs =

Major General Ian Deetlefs SSAS PG SM JCD
- Military career
- Allegiance: South Africa
- Branch: South African Army
- Service years: 1965–2003
- Rank: Major General
- Commands: Chief of Defence Reserves
- Awards: Star of South Africa SSAS iPhrothiya yeGolide PG Southern Cross Medal SM John Chard Decoration JCD Pro Patria Medal General Service Medal (South Africa) Unitas (Unity) Medal John Chard Medal

Maj Gen Ian Deetlefs (Rtd) SSAS PG SM JCD served in the South African Army's Reserve Force from 1965–2003. He became the first Chief of Defence Reserves of the South African National Defence Force in 1997. He retired from the SANDF in 2003 and was succeeded by Maj Gen R.C. Andersen.

== Education ==
General Deetlefs matriculated from Maritzburg College in 1964. He studied Economics at the University of Natal (Durban) and graduated in 1971.

== Military career ==
Gen Deetlefs has served with

- 1 Special Service Battalion (1 SSB) (B Company of 1 South African Infantry Battalion) (1SAI)
- Army Gymnasium
- 6 South African Infantry Battalion (6SAI)
- Natal Carbineers
- OC Umkomaas Commando
- OC Congella Regiment (Founding Member)
- Natal Command (SSO) Citizen Force Liaison Officer
- First Chairman of the Reserve Force Council
- First Chief of Defence Reserves of the SANDF (Reporting to Chief SANDF) ( Member of the Plenary Defence Staff Council (PDSC)) (Founder and Chairman of the Defence Reserve Board) (DRB)

As part of his responsibilities regularly briefed the Joint Standing Committee on Defence of the SA Parliament.

== Civilian career ==
Some of his work experience includes

- Director of JSE listed Companies and various Private Companies
- 1995–2003: Chairman Of The Board - Denel

== Honours and awards ==
Badge for Voluntary Reserve Force Service (Service Award)
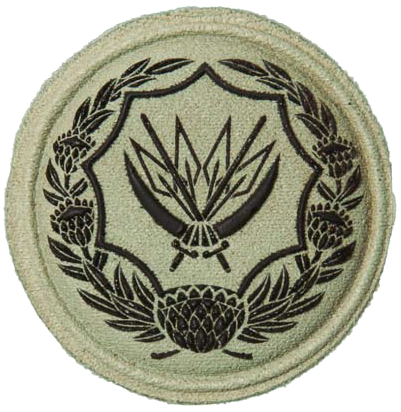
Five Years Voluntary Service. Black on Thatch beige, Embossed.

Gen Deetlefs has been awarded the following:

- Star of South Africa (Silver) (SSAS)
- iPhrothiya yeGolide (Golden Protea) (PG)
- Southern Cross Medal (1975) (SM)
- John Chard Decoration (JCD)
- Pro Patria Medal
- General Service Medal (South Africa)
- Unitas (Unity) Medal
- John Chard Medal

Military offices
New title New Post	Chief of Defence Reserves; 1997 - October 2003	Succeeded by R.C. Andersen
