= Stephen Mulholland =

Canadian surgeon and entrepreneur

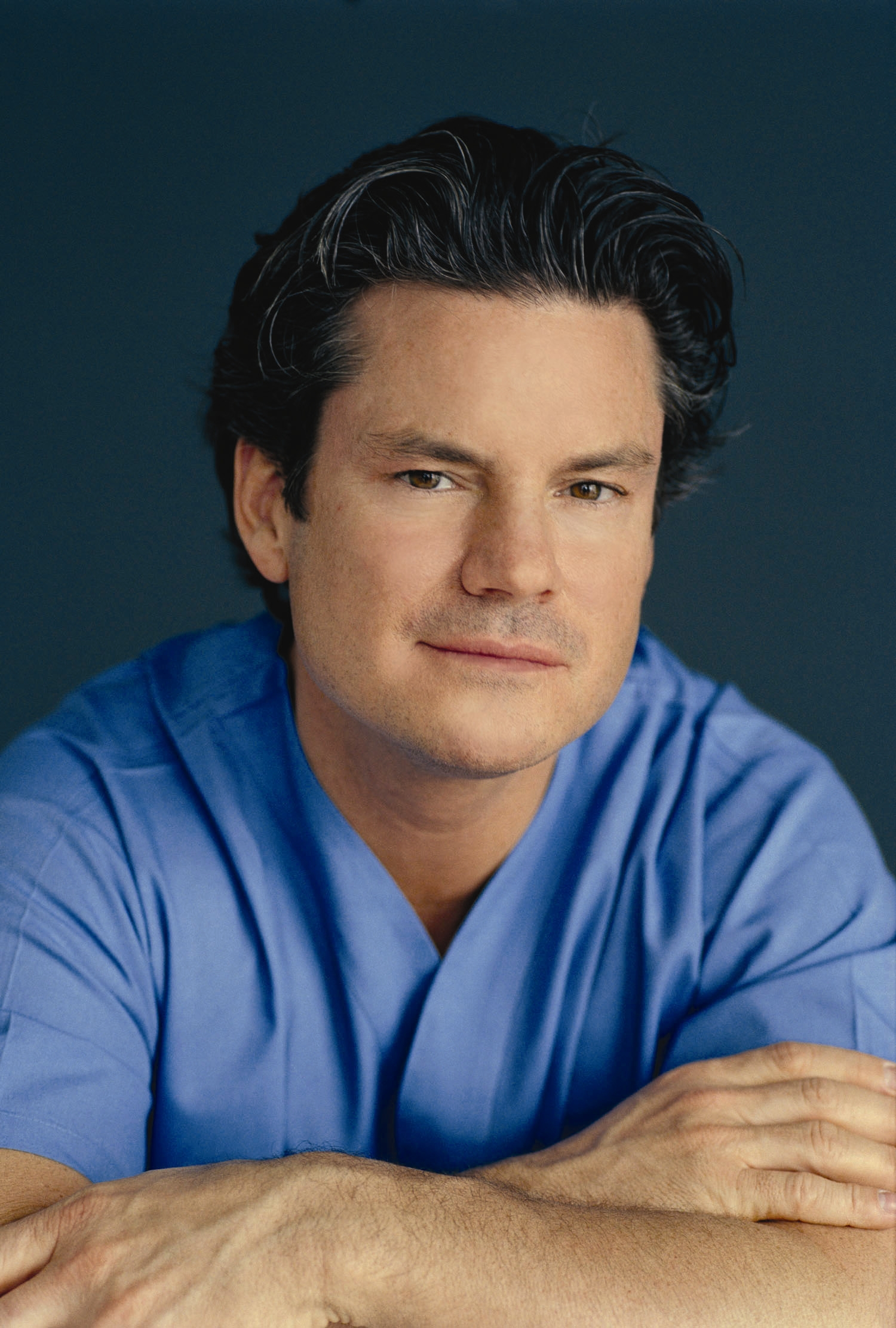
- Mulholland in 2015
- Born: R. Stephen Mulholland; August 5, 1960 (age 66); West Vancouver, British Columbia, Canada
- Education: Lake Superior State University; University of Toronto Medical School
- Occupations: Surgeon and entrepreneur
- Employer: BoomerangFX (founder)
- Known for: Plastic and reconstructive surgery
- Website: drmulholland.com

Stephen Mulholland (born August 5, 1960) is a Canadian surgeon with an expertise in plastic and reconstructive surgery, and a former professional ice hockey player.

Mulholland is the founder of SpaMedica, an aesthetic plastic surgery center located in Toronto. He is best known for non-invasive practices, including the Pan G. Facelift and the BodyTite for which he owns or has developed the patents.

== Early life and hockey career ==
Born in West Vancouver, British Columbia, Mulholland attended Lake Superior State University on a hockey scholarship, playing as a forward and becoming Central Collegiate Hockey Association Rookie of the Year for the 1979–1980 season. Over the course of his collegiate career, he was a four-time CCHA All-Star and NCAA All-American. Mulholland "led the [LSSU] Lakers in scoring during all four years", becoming "the only player to accomplish that feat at LSSU".

For three of the four seasons that he played, he was the highest goal-scorer, finishing his collegiate career with a 206-point total surpassed only by Jim Dowd and Sean Tallaire. Mulholland "also excelled in the classroom" throughout this time, "earning CCHA All-Academic honors in 1980-81, 1981-82 and 1982-83; and was also an Academic All-American in 1982-83". In 2016, Mulholland was named to the 1976-86 Laker Hockey All-Decade Team as part of the 50th anniversary of the school's hockey program, receiving the most fan ballots for a forward in that decade.

After graduating, Mulholland played professional hockey for the 1983–1984 season, playing three games for the Colorado Flames, before transferring to Rögle BK, in Sweden. He played in 28 regular season games and two playoff games for Rögle BK, scoring 49 points off 32 goals and 17 assists during the regular season, and one point off an assist in the playoffs. Following the season, he retired from the sport and returned to school to pursue his medical degree and become a physician.

Mulholland attended the University of Toronto Medical School, where he graduated in 1988. He completed his general and plastic surgery training at the University of Toronto and became certified by the Royal College of Physicians and Surgeons of Canada in 1994.

== Medical career ==
Mulholland began his career as a consultant for St. Joseph's Hospital in Hamilton, Ontario where he worked on reconstruction of faces and necks from which tumors had been removed.

In 1997, Mulholland began focusing on aesthetic plastic surgery. He founded SpaMedica, an aesthetic spa located in Toronto, where he provides non-invasive techniques such as Botox injections and laser treatments. Mulholland is best known for his non-surgical facelift techniques, including the Pan G. treatment which he launched in 2000.

Mulholland has also appeared on The Real Housewives of Toronto, where his wife Ann Kaplan Mulholland was one of the main cast members.

=== Additional career developments ===
He has served as the sole guest Plastic Surgeon on Cityline for over 22 years.

In 2007, Mulholland co-founded Invasix Inc. (now known as InMode) with Dr. Michael Kreindel, introducing Radiofrequency Assisted Liposuction (RFAL), commercially known as BodyTite, along with FaceTite, NeckTite, AccuTite, and CelluTite.

== Personal life ==
Mulholland is married to Ann Kaplan Mulholland, a businesswoman and star of The Real Housewives of Toronto. They bought Lympne Castle in Kent, England in 2023 and subsequently invested £17m in converting it into a venue and tourist attraction.

In 2025, Kaplan Mulholland claimed that the phasing-out of the non-domiciled tax status, as announced in the March 2024 United Kingdom budget, was key in their joint decision to relocate to Italy.
