= Eric Dalton =

South African cricketer (1906–1981)

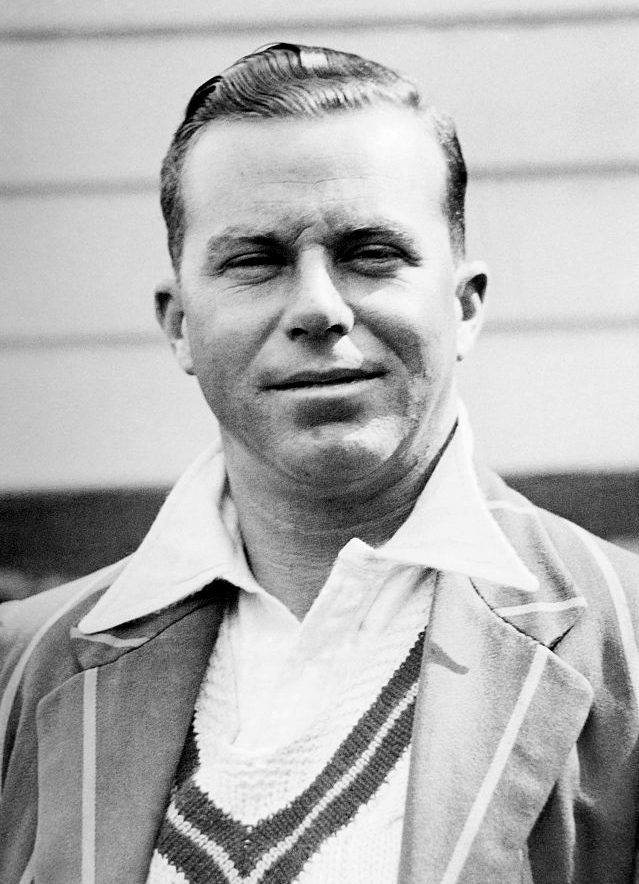
- Dalton pictured in 1935

Personal information
- Born: 2 December 1906; Durban, Natal
- Died: 3 June 1981 (aged 74); Durban, Natal
- Batting: Right-handed
- Bowling: Right-arm legbreak

International information
- National side: South Africa
- Test debut: 29 June 1929 v England
- Last Test: 3 March 1939 v England

Career statistics
| Competition | Test | First-class |
|---|---|---|
| Matches | 15 | 121 |
| Runs scored | 698 | 5,333 |
| Batting average | 31.72 | 33.12 |
| 100s/50s | 2/3 | 13/24 |
| Top score | 117 | 157 |
| Balls bowled | 864 | 7,662 |
| Wickets | 12 | 139 |
| Bowling average | 40.83 | 25.81 |
| 5 wickets in innings | 0 | 5 |
| 10 wickets in match | 0 | 0 |
| Best bowling | 4/59 | 6/42 |
| Catches/stumpings | 5/– | 72/– |
- Source: Cricinfo, 14 November 2022

Eric Londesbrough Dalton (2 December 1906 – 3 June 1981) was a South African cricketer who played in 15 Test matches from 1929 to 1938–39. He was born and died in Durban, KwaZulu-Natal. He attended Durban Preparatory High School as a young boy.

He was part of the South African team that toured England in 1929, with Dalton playing a solitary Test at Lord's where he scored 6 and 1. Towards the end of the tour he had a remarkable game at Canterbury, making his career highest score, scoring 157 in the first innings and adding 116 not out in the second when with the tourists facing defeat he added 100 in 52 minutes with AL Ochse in a last wicket partnership which saved the game.

In a match against Tasmania during the 1931–32 South African tour of Australia, Dalton had his jaw broken by a bouncer from Laurie Nash, who was on a hat-trick at the time.

In 1935, Dalton was a member of the South African team that won a Test match in England for the first time. During the match at Lord's, although not especially noted for his bowling, he took the key wickets of Wally Hammond and captain Bob Wyatt in England's first innings to return figures of 2 for 33. In the final Test at The Oval, he scored 117 runs in the first innings, his highest Test score, and 57 not out in the second as the match was drawn, The result gave South Africa their first Test series victory in England.

After his cricket career ended he concentrated on golf. He won the South African Amateur Championship in 1950 and represented South Africa in the first Commonwealth Tournament at St Andrew's in 1954. He was also adept at several other sports, including bowls, tennis and table tennis, and had a keen interest in music, playing the piano and singing baritone.
