= Gus Attridge =

South African businessman

Michael Guy Attridge, known as Gus Attridge is a South African businessman. He is the deputy CEO of Aspen Pharmacare, which he co-founded with Stephen Saad in 1997. In 2013 Attridge's 4% personal stake in the company was valued at over $320 million.
