= Eric Saville =

South African World War II flying ace

Eric Cowley Saville
- Born: 3 February 1922; Eshowe, Natal
- Died: 19 September 1943 (aged 21); Over Breda, Italy
- Burial place: Naples War Cemetery
- Military career
- Branch: South African Air Force
- Rank: Major
- Service number: 103255V
- Commands: 260 Squadron
- Awards: Distinguished Flying Cross

Eric Cowley Saville (1922-1943) was a South African flying ace of World War II, credited with 8 'kills'.

Born in Eshowe in Natal, he went to school at Durban High School. He joined the Permanent Force in the South African Air Force and was posted to 2 Squadron SAAF on 15 October 1941. He moved to 112 Squadron in August 1942 as a flight commander. He was awarded the DFC in September 1942 for 5 confirmed kills, 2 probables and 3 damaged.

He was awarded a bar to his DFC in December 1942 and credited with 3 more kills

In May 1943 he was promoted and took command of 260 Squadron. He was shot down over Italy on 19 September 1943.

He was buried in Naples War Cemetery.
