= Geoffrey Abbott =

South African field hockey player

Sport
- Sport: Field hockey
Medal record
Africa Cup of Nations
Gold medal – first place	2013 Nairobi

Geoffrey Grant Abbott (born 17 April 1985) is a South African field hockey player who competed in the 2008 Summer Olympics.
