= Philip J. Nel =

South African rugby union player

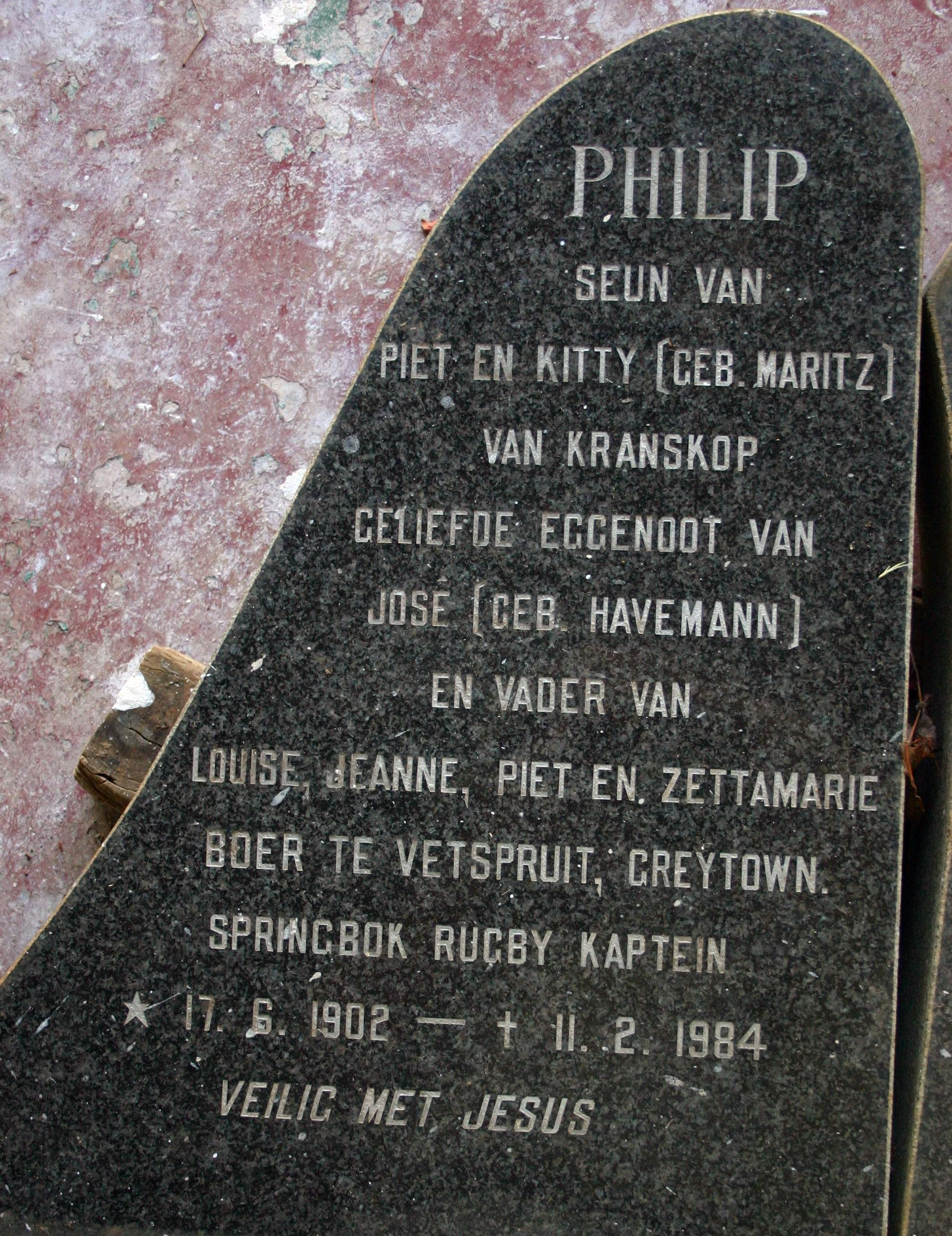
Memorial tablet at 'Menneheim' near Greytown

Philip Jacobus Nel (17 June 1902 – 11 February 1984) was a South African rugby player.

The son of Piet Nel and Kitty Maritz, he was educated at Maritzburg College, matriculating as Head Prefect and captain of the rugby First XV in 1921. Nel enjoyed the rare distinction of earning a Natal (open) rugby cap while still at school. He made his debut for the Springboks against the 1928 All Blacks, and captained the side in 1933 (against the Wallabies) and on the all-conquering tour of Australia and New Zealand in 1937. Known affectionately as "The Greatest Springboks", Nel's 1937 team remains the only Springbok team ever to have won a test series in New Zealand.

Nel saw action in World War II, serving as a major in the Umvoti Mounted Rifles.

Married to Jose Havemann, they produced a family of four children (Louise, Jeanne, Piet, and Zettamarie). Affectionately known as "oom Flip", he farmed at 'Vetspruit' and died at his home in Greytown on 11 February 1984, after a long illness.

He is one of six captains to lead his side to a test series win on New Zealand soil, along with Trevor Allan (1949 Australia), John Dawes (1971 British Lions), Andrew Slack (1986 Australia), Philippe Saint-André (1994 France) and Johnny Sexton (2022 Ireland).

Sporting positions
Preceded by Bennie Osler	Springbok Captain; 1933–37	Succeeded by Danie Craven
