= 1937 South Africa rugby union tour of Australia and New Zealand =

Summary
P	W	D	L
Total
29	27	0	2
Test match
5	4	0	1
Opponent
P	W	D	L
Australia
2	2	0	0
New Zealand
3	2	0	1

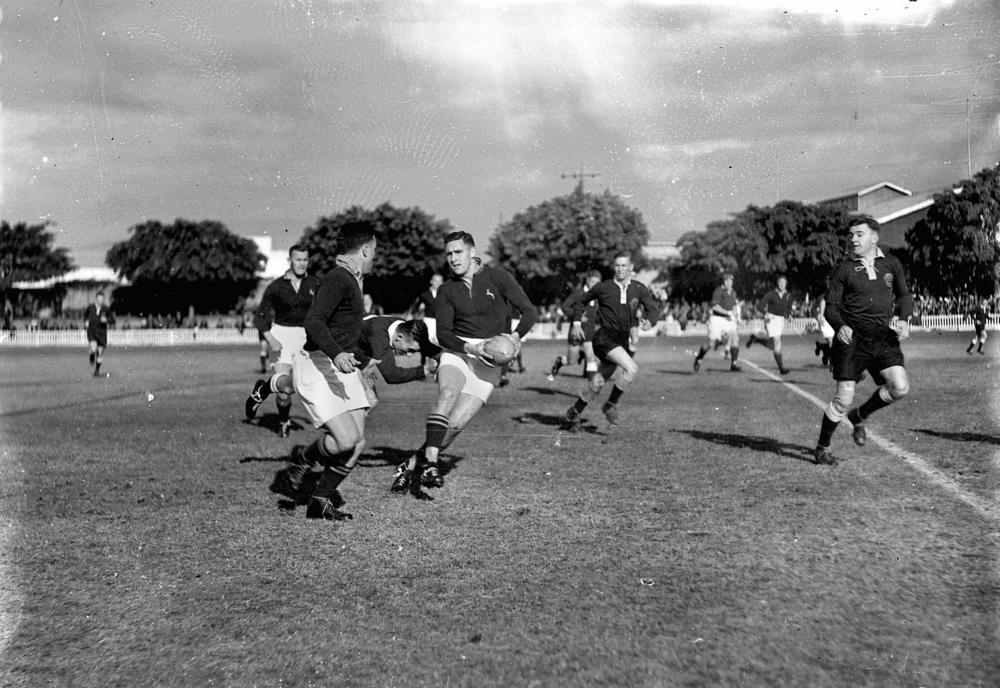
The 1937 Springbok backline in action against Australia.

The 1937 South Africa tour to Australasia was one of the most successful Springbok tours in history, so much so that the touring team was nicknamed the "Invincibles". The squad was captained by Philip Nel.

The tour opened in Australia with a match in Perth against Western Australia. Two Tests were played at the Sydney Cricket Ground against the white-jerseyed Australian Wallabies, both of which were won by the tourists 9–5 and 26–17. The single defeat of the Australian-leg of the tour was to the NSW Waratahs on the same ground. The Springboks party also visited the Australian capital city Canberra for the first time, receiving a civic reception, however a scheduled match against Royal Military College, Duntroon was cancelled due to a measles outbreak among the cadets.

When the Springboks arrived in New Zealand later that year nobody expected them to win the series, as no other South African team had ever achieved the feat, and when the New Zealand leg of the tour kicked off on 14 August with a 13–7 loss to New Zealand at Athletic Park in Wellington, it seemed business as usual.

Mr Nel and his men had other ideas, adopting a strategy sent to them via telegram from Springbok great Paul Roos: "skrum, skrum, skrum". Their dominant pack was the impetus used to deal New Zealand two convincing defeats; a 13–6 win at Lancaster Park in Christchurch and a 17–6 win at Eden Park in Auckland, taking the series 2–1. The latter translates into a 27–6 (5 try to nil) win using today's point system. The hero of the decider was centre Louis Babrow, who scored two critical tries. Babrow nearly did not feature in the last test as he was an observant Jew and the match fell on Yom Kippur; however, he justified playing on a high holy day by saying that the sun had not yet risen in South Africa by the time of kickoff in New Zealand.

The 1937 Springbok team remains the only Springbok team ever to have won a series in New Zealand and contained legendary players such as Danie Craven and Boy Louw.

== Matches in Australia ==
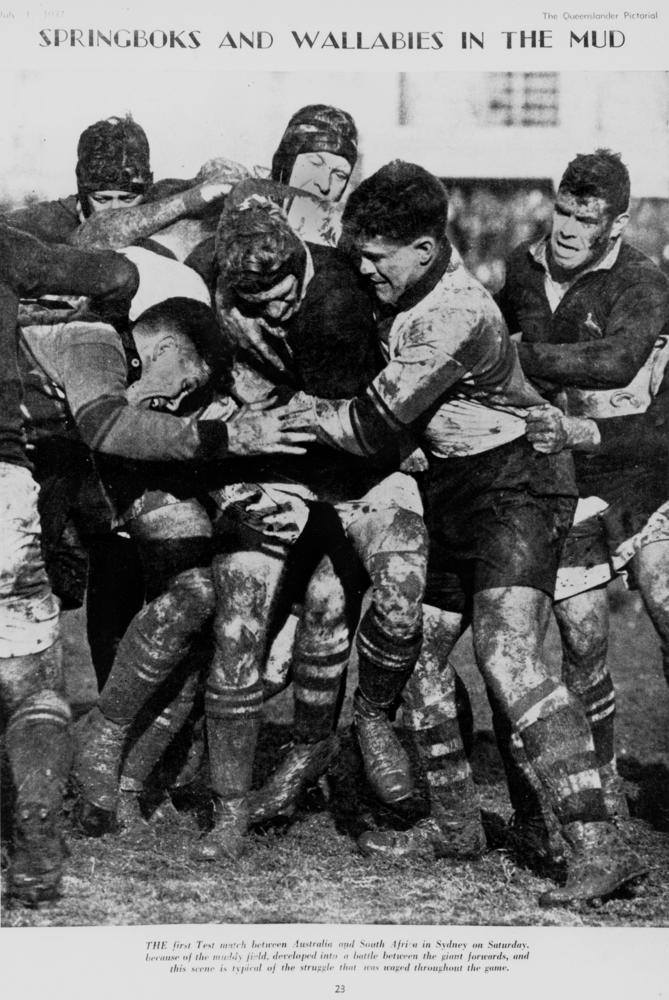
Springboks (dark green jersey) and Wallabies (white jerseys with green mid-band) forwards compete for the ball in the mud during the First Test at the Sydney Cricket Ground.

Scores and results list South Africa's points tally first.

Opposing Team	For	Against	Date	Venue	Status
Western Australia	47	8	31 May 1937	Perth	Tour match
South Australia	55	3	5 June 1937	Adelaide	Tour match
(Victoria (state)) Victoria	45	11	12 June 1937	Melbourne	Tour match
Combined Western XV	63	0	16 June 1937	Orange	Tour match
New South Wales	6	17	19 June 1937	Sydney	Tour match
Australia	9	5	26 June 1937	Cricket Ground, Sydney	Test match
Newcastle	58	8	30 June 1937	Newcastle	Tour match
Australia XV	36	3	3 July 1937	Brisbane	Tour match
Toowoomba XV	60	0	7 July 1937	Toowoomba	Tour match
Queensland	39	4	11 July 1937	Brisbane	Tour match
Australia	26	17	17 July 1937	Cricket Ground, Sydney	Test match

== Matches in New Zealand ==
Scores and results list South Africa's points tally first.

Opposing Team	For	Against	Date	Venue	Status
Auckland	19	5	25 July 1937	Eden Park, Auckland	Tour match
Waikato / King Country / Thames Valley	6	3	28 July 1937	Rugby Park, Hamilton	Tour match
Taranaki	17	3	31 July 1937	Pukekura Park, New Plymouth	Tour match
Manawatu	39	3	4 August 1937	Showgrounds, Palmerston North	Tour match
Wellington	29	0	8 August 1937	Athletic Park, Wellington	Tour match
New Zealand	7	13	14 August 1937	Athletic Park, Wellington	Test match
Nelson / Golden Bay-Motueka / Marlborough	22	0	18 August 1937	Lansdowne Park, Blenheim	Tour match
Canterbury	23	8	22 August 1937	Lancaster Park, Christchurch	Tour match
West Coast-Buller	31	6	26 August 1937	Rugby Park, Greymouth	Tour match
South Canterbury	43	6	28 August 1937	Fraser Park, Timaru	Tour match
New Zealand	13	6	4 September 1937	Lancaster Park, Christchurch	Test match
Southland	30	17	8 September 1937	Rugby Park, Invercargill	Tour match
Otago	47	7	12 September 1937	Carisbrook, Dunedin	Tour match
Hawke's Bay	21	12	15 September 1937	McLean Park, Napier	Tour match
Poverty Bay / Bay of Plenty / East Coast	33	3	20 September 1937	Rugby Park, Gisborne	Tour match
New Zealand	17	6	25 September 1937	Eden Park, Auckland	Test match
North Auckland	14	6	29 September 1937	Okara Park, Whangārei	Tour match
