= Florence Attridge =

English factory worker (1901–1975)

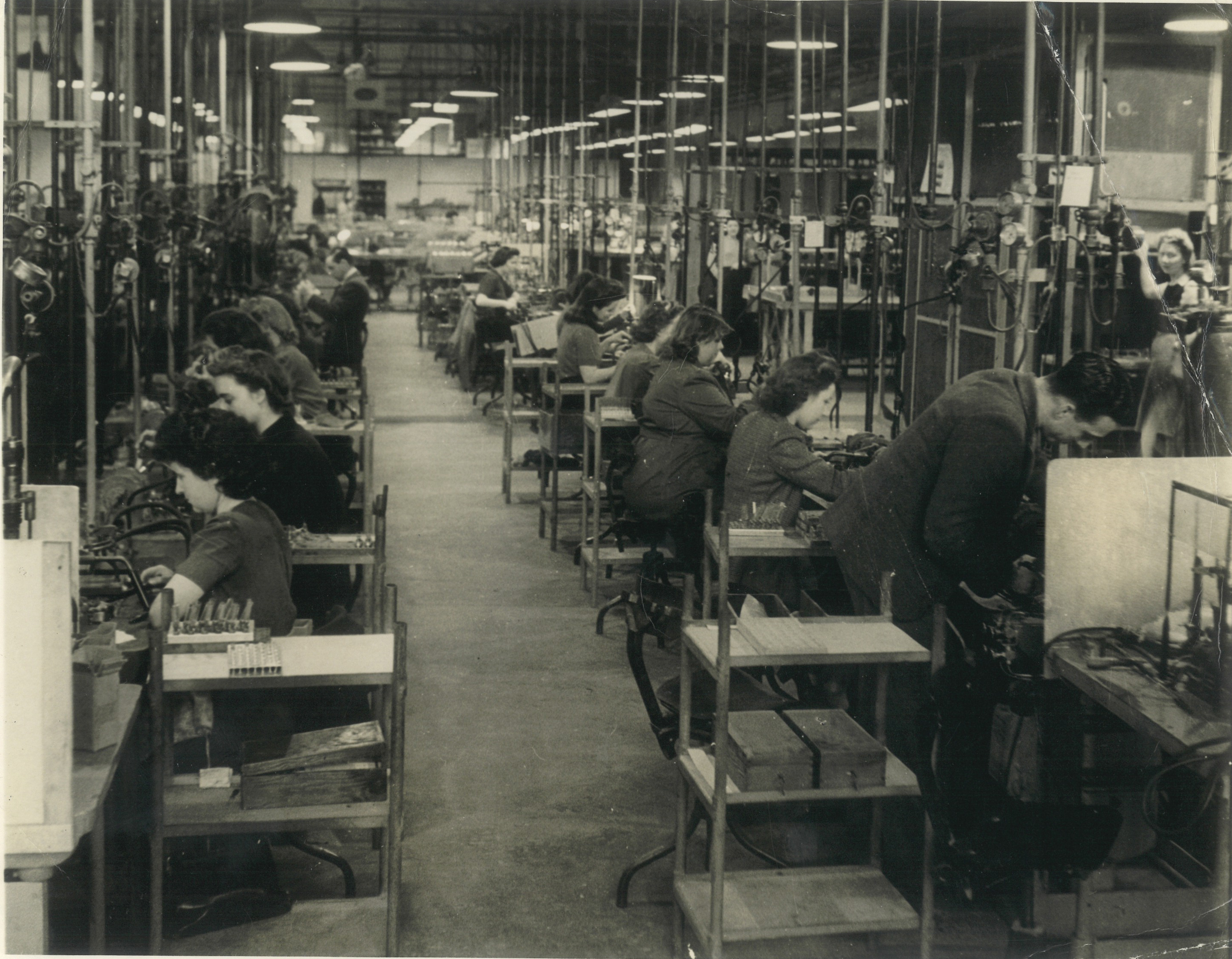
Women working at Marconi in the 1950s (Chelmsford Museum)

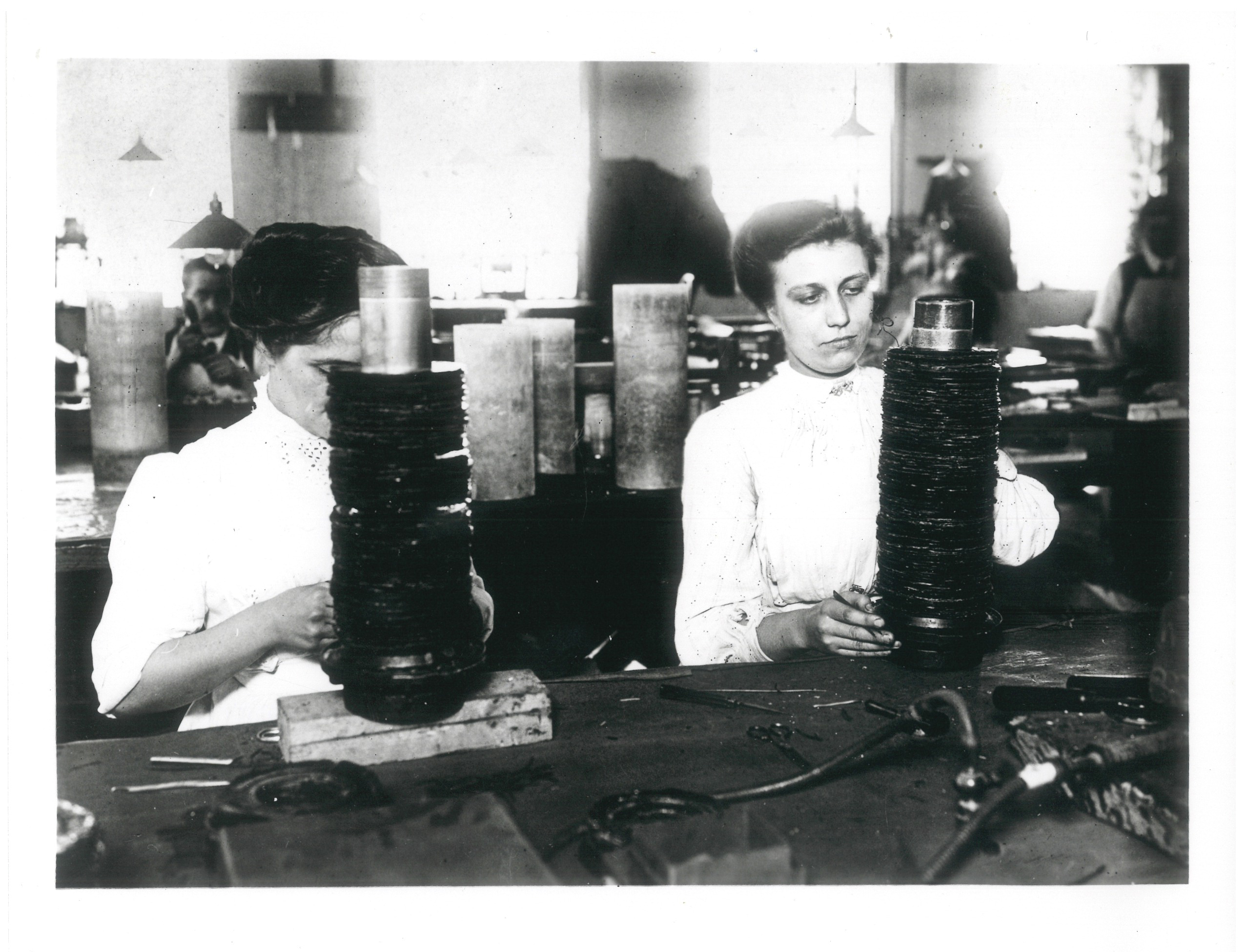
Women working at the Marconi Hall Street Works c. 1900s (Chelmsford Museum)

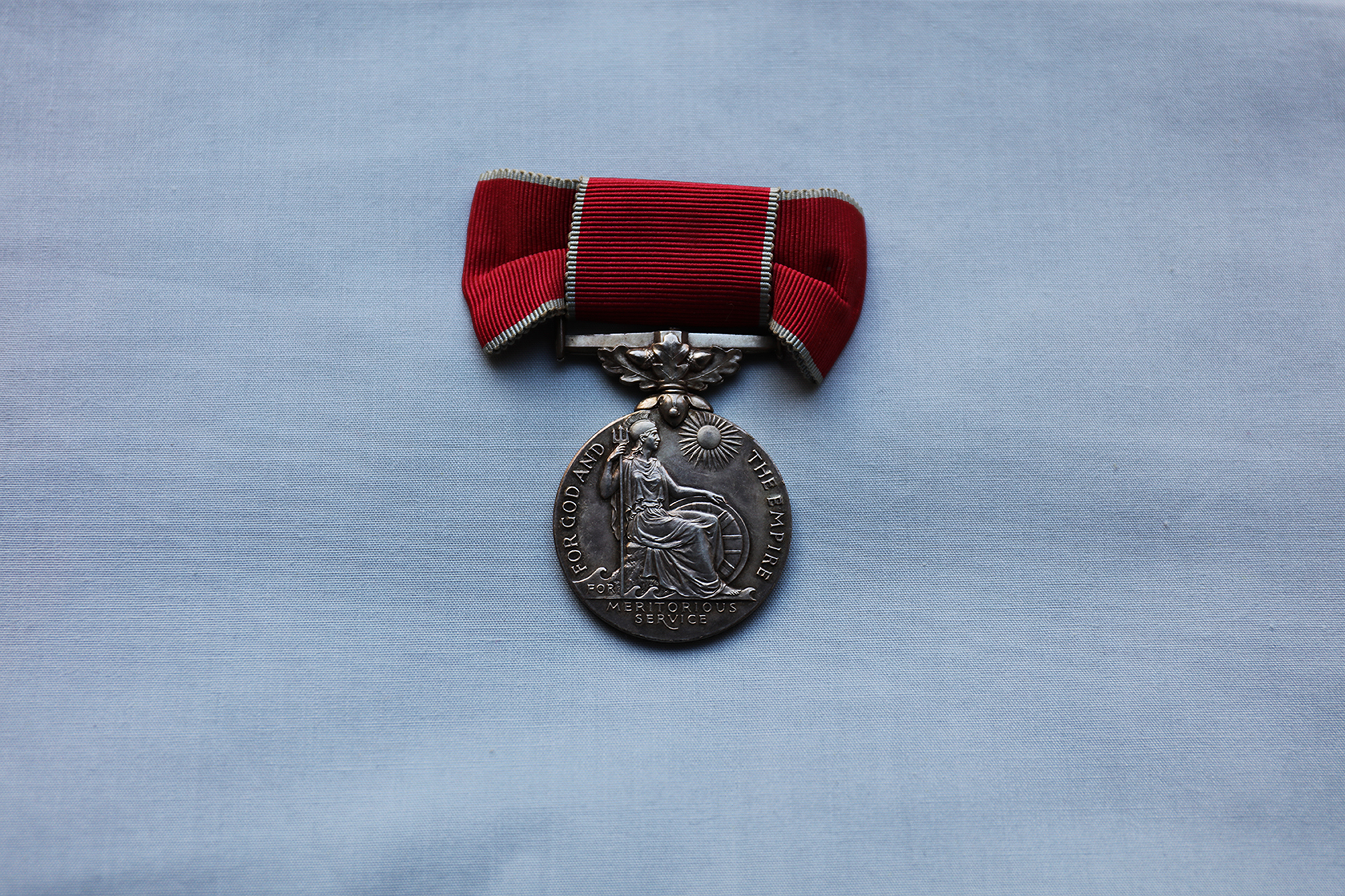
Front of Attridge's British Empire Medal (Chelmsford Museum)

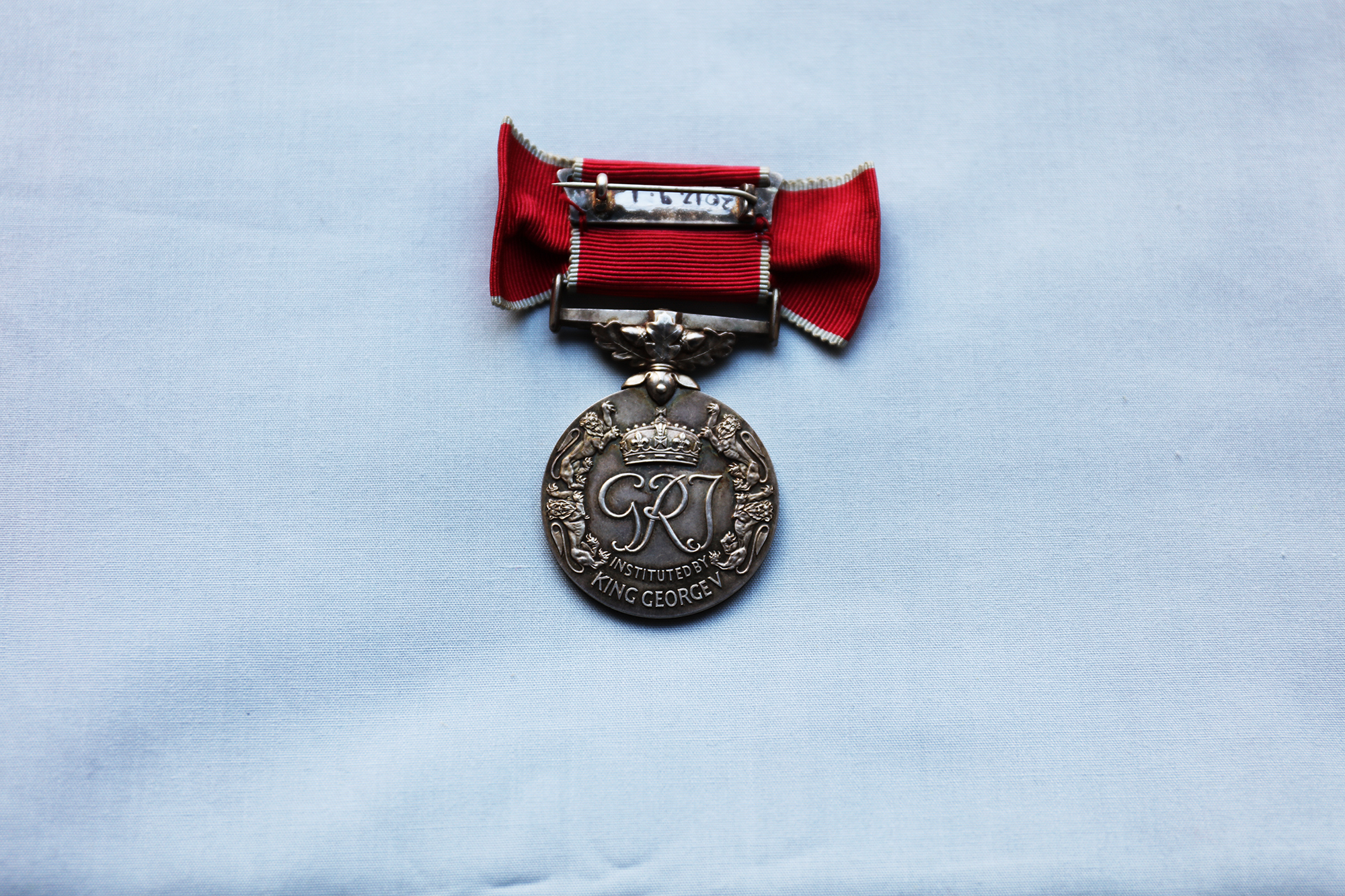
Back of Florence Attridge's British Empire Medal (Chelmsford Museum)

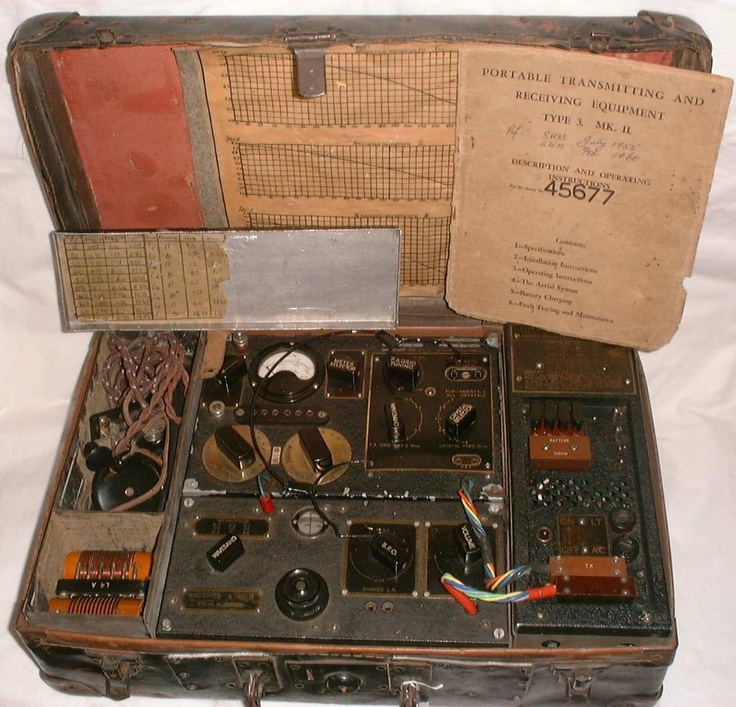
The British Type 3 Mark II Radio (Chelmsford Museum)

Florence Emily Attridge BEM (1901 – 1975) worked at the Marconi wireless factory in Chelmsford, Essex, and received a British Empire Medal (civil division) for her contributions to the war effort during the Second World War. Joining the factory after the First World War, by 1944 she was managing a team of women in the coil winding shop. Papers accompanying her medal suggest that she was involved in making secret radio sets used by the resistance during the war.

== Work ==
Attridge joined the coil winding shop at the Marconi New Street factory in Chelmsford just after the First World War. Guglielmo Marconi, who is often incorrectly credited with being the inventor of the radio, built the factory in 1912. In 1920, the factory was the site of the first experimental wireless broadcast.

Attridge was involved in making key components of the radio sets - the coils, transformers, inductors and chokes. Her job was to wind wires of various sizes around frames or magnetic cores. This is how the coil winding shop received its name. Her work was intricate and exacting and the women typically worked 12-hour shifts. Women played a vital role in the creation of new electrical devices in many pioneering companies such as Marconi, doing most of the assembly work. As the technology improved, this work became increasingly intricate and time-consuming and it was found that women excelled at these tasks. At that time women, could also be paid lower wages than men, so hiring women for assembly jobs meant more profits for the company. From the consumers' perspective, however, this profit margin paved the way for the mass production of electrical goods at prices that were affordable for ordinary people.

In 1946, Attridge received a British Empire Medal (civil division) for her contributions to the war effort during the Second World War. She was listed as head of the coil winding shop by that time. Papers accompanying the medal include a letter from "K3 section", which was part of the Naval Intelligence code breaking section. This suggests that Attridge may have worked on the British Type 3 Mark II radio made by Marconi and used by spies during the war. This radio, more commonly known as the B2, was issued to agents, resistance groups and special forces operating in occupied territory. Weighing just 8lbs it was first used in the field in 1944 and the Marconi Company made over 400 of them. The radio required specialist miniaturised components - work trusted to expert staff. Attridge would have led a small team in assembling these components, probably in a closed off area of the factory to ensure secrecy as the factory operated 24 hours a day.

== Personal life ==
Attridge was born on 14 June 1901 in Chelmsford. Her parents were Henry Attridge (died 1938) and Martha Jane (née Gosling, died 1939). She had five brothers and 3 sisters and, in 1911, the family were recorded living at 1&2 Browns Yard, Moulsham Street. Her father was a "steel grinder" and may well have worked at Crompton ARC in Chelmsford, before moving to Marconi. Attridge joined her father working at Marconi just after the end of the First World War.

In 1950, she married John William Hayes, also of Chelmsford. She was 49 at the time of her marriage and no children are recorded.

In 1975, she and her husband died within a few months of each other.

== Commemorations ==
In 2016, Chelmsford Museum Services acquired Attridge's British Empire Medal. With the medal came eight documents, including a signed letter from Buckingham Palace, a signed letter from the Admiralty, a signed telegram from the Admiralty signal establishment and a signed letter/telegram from Admiral H. W. Grant, then managing director of the Marconi Company. There was also a letter from "K3 section", which was part of the Naval Intelligence code breaking section.

In 2018-2019, Attridge featured in a touring exhibition celebrating the lives and achievements of Essex women. The exhibition was part of a two-year project by Essex County Council, "Snapping the Stiletto", exploring how Essex women's lives have changed since the Representation of the People Act in 1918 gave the first British women the right to vote.

In 2020, Attridge featured in Soundings from Essex, a celebration of Essex women in science. In December 2020, a blue plaque was unveiled in her honour on the wall of her home in Andrews Place in Chelmsford.
