= Aspen Pharmacare =

Major pharmaceutical company in South Africa

Aspen Pharmacare Holdings Limited
- Type: Public
- Traded as: JSE: APN; JSE Limited
- Industry: Health care, pharmaceutical industry
- Predecessor: Lennon Ltd
- Founded: 1850, public 1997, Durban, South Africa
- Headquarters: La Lucia Ridge, uMhlanga, KwaZulu-Natal, South Africa
- Key people: Stephen Saad (Group CE)
- Products: Specialty branded pharmaceuticals including steriles, injectables, oral solid dose, liquids, semi-solids, biologicals, active pharmaceutical ingredients
- Revenue: ▲R 40,709,000,000 (FY 2023)
- Net income: ▲R 16,811,000,000 (FY 2023)
- Total assets: ▲R 134,284,000,000 (FY 2023)
- Total equity: ▲R 86,236,000,000 (FY 2023)
- Number of employees: 9,100
- Website: www.aspenpharma.com

Aspen Pharmacare Holdings Limited is a multinational pharmaceutical company headquartered in uMhlanga, South Africa. Founded in 1997, it listed on the Johannesburg Stock Exchange (JSE) in 1998, and purchased South African Druggists in 1999 before expanding into international markets. The largest pharmaceutical company in Africa through aggressive mergers and expansion, with major manufacturing sites in locations such as Gqeberha in South Africa, Bad Oldesloe in Germany, Notre-Dame-de-Bondeville in France, and Oss, Netherlands, Aspen is known for manufacturing and distributing branded pharmaceuticals as well as generic HIV/AIDS antiretrovirals (ARVs) and cancer medications. Among other products, Aspen has also been involved in manufacturing the Janssen COVID-19 vaccine through "fill and finish", and has the rights to sell the product under its own brand name Aspenovax. The company's revenue in 2022 was R38.6 billion (US$2.36 billion). In 2016, Aspen was fined for high prices on cancer drugs, and after an investigation Aspen committed to reduce prices for five years in the European Union.

== History ==
=== Founding and acquisitions (1997-2003) ===
According to the company website, the legacy company behind Aspen Holdings was founded in 1850 by Berry Grey Lennon, an Irish chemist, who opened a drug store in Port Elizabeth, South Africa. In 1898, B.G. Lennon & Co. established itself as Lennon Ltd, and by 1930 it was the largest pharmaceutical company in the southern hemisphere. Mergers continued throughout the 1950s and 1960s. Lennon was listed on the Johannesburg Stock Exchange (JSE) in 1968, and in 1975 it started a research and development department to develop and register generic drugs.

Separate from Lennon, the originating Aspen company was founded in 1997 by South African businesspeople Stephen Saad, Gus Attridge, and Steve Sturlese, as well as a fourth shareholder. The business was initially located in Durban, South Africa. With backing from Investec, Aspen listed on the JSE in 1998. Aspen purchased South African Druggists (SAD) in 1999, the oldest pharmaceutical business in South Africa, for R2.4 billion in a hostile take over. SAD still owned a large manufacturing facility in Gqeberha and the Lennon home remedies brand.

With Saad as chief executive and Attridge as deputy chief executive, co-founder Steve Sturlese left the company in 2001, and that year Aspen expanded into Australia. Also in 2001, Saad negotiated the "first-ever voluntary" licenses to manufacture generic versions of antiretrovirals (ARVs) to treat HIV, ending a "stand off" between the South African government and various multinational drug companies over anticompetitive activities. Also, in 2001, GlaxoSmithKline (GSK) granted Aspen the right to manufacture low-cost generics of three of its ARVs. By 2003, Aspen was the largest generic medicine distributor in South Africa. In August 2003, Aspen launched Aspen Stavudine - its first generic ARV drug, building an Oral Solid Dosage drug facility in Gqeberha to produce what was Africa's first generic antiretroviral. Aspen's efforts led to expanded access to affordable treatments for HIV/AIDS.

=== International expansion (2004-2019) ===
Aspen acquired Fine Chemicals Corporation in Cape Town, South Africa in 2004, which was the only producer of active pharmaceutical ingredients in South Africa. Also in 2004 it acquired Infacare from Royal Numico. In 2005, Aspen was granted a license by Merck & Co. to produce efavirenz and by 2005 Aspen was the largest supplier of ARVs in Africa. In 2007, Aspen announced it would expand into Latin America in partnership with Strides Pharma Science Limited. At the time, Aspen had operations in South Africa, the United Kingdom, Australia, the United States, India, Kenya, and Tanzania. Aspen was producing nine ARVs by 2009. In June 2009, Aspen was contracted to provide ARVs to the South African government's HIV/AIDS treatment program. Also, Aspen increased its production to fulfill the President's Emergency Plan for AIDS Relief (PEPFAR) orders from the United States. In 2009, Aspen purchased the rights to market Melphalan and several other cancer drugs from GSK, such as levothyroxine, azathioprine, digoxin and allopurinol. As part of the transaction, GSK purchased 16% of Aspen's shares for £268 million, while Aspen acquired GSK's manufacturing site in Bad Oldesloe, Germany and the rights to market and distribute GSK's pharmaceutical products in South Africa. Finalized in 2011, in late 2010, Aspen announced it would acquire the Australian company Sigma Pharma for US$1.24 billion.

In 2013 Aspen expanded in Africa by opening businesses in Nigeria, and around that time, also purchased 60% of the company Shelys, which had businesses in Uganda, Tanzania, and Kenya. That year the company continued to expand globally and began promoting its products in Russia, also investing US$215 million in the licenses for various Nestle SA infant nutritional products in Australia, Southern Africa, and Latin America. In 2013, Aspen announced it would acquire drug brands from MSD and an active pharmaceutical ingredient (API) company in the Netherlands as well as anticoagulant rights. It had expanded into 21 countries in 2014, and built new global headquarters. In 2016 it bought intellectual property and manufacturing rights for Astra Zeneca's anaesthetics, and GSK sold its stake in Aspen in October 2016. In mid-2016, Aspen was unable to supply Thyrax in the Netherlands due to changing production locations, with the shortage later extended into 2017. Affected patients were forced to switch medications in the interim and it was reported that 30% risked experiencing side-effects, with a dose-equivalent switch from Thyrax to other LT4 brands induced overdosing in 24-63% of patients. A later evaluation noted that "many patients received oversupplementation" as a consequence of the switch. A joint paper on the matter was published in the European Thyroid Journal with recommendations such as reevaluating methods used to determine "the bioequivalence of levothyroxine preparations".

Since 2018 the company admits a "commercial focus on specialised therapies", i.e. specialty drugs. In August 2018, Aspen stated it was the world's largest anesthetics company outside of the United States. Also in 2018, Aspen announced plans for a new US$80 million manufacturing facility in Gqeberha for late stage cancer drugs. That year Aspen sold its infant nutritional business to Lactalis for US$865 million, and in 2019, it sold its Japanese generics unit to Novartis. In May 2019, Mylan purchased a portfolio of products from Aspen in Australia. In 2020, Aspen also sold the intellectual property and commercialization rights of its European thrombosis business to Mylan.

=== Corporate developments, new products (2020-2023) ===
In 2020, Aspen focused on meeting a demand for dexamethasone pills, a steroid used on extremely ill patients in the COVID-19 pandemic. Also in 2020, Aspen opened a US$80 million high-containment facility in Gqeberha, and announced a further US$160 million to be spent on two additional sterile plants, "paving the way for a push into vaccines." In March 2021, Aspen began manufacturing Johnson & Johnson's COVID-19 vaccine, becoming responsible for "fill and finish" of Janssen COVID-19 vaccine stock made elsewhere. In February 2021 the South African government had signed a contract for 11 million doses of this vaccine and ordered another 20 million doses in April 2021. In late 2021, Aspen announced a contract with Johnson & Johnson to produce 700 million COVID-19 vaccine doses by January 2023. After worries that the vaccine fill stock made by an Emergent BioSolutions plant in Baltimore might have been contaminated, that year Aspen destroyed some of its doses. In August 2021, Aspen filled vaccine stock from a plant in the Netherlands, with 40% of those doses supposed to go to Europe and the remaining 60% to Africa through the end of September. Aspen agreed to sell several products, all of which were sold in South Africa, to the Swiss company Acino Pharma AG in October 2021. Gus Attridge retired at the end of 2021 and took up the position of Deputy Group Chief Executive of the Aspen Group. He was replaced as chief financial officer by Sean Capazorio.

By 2022, anticoagulants and anaesthetics made up 30% of Aspen's business. In March 2022, Aspen concluded a licensing agreement with Johnson & Johnson to manufacture its own COVID-vaccine, to be named Aspenovax and sold in African countries. After no Aspenovax orders were placed during a backlog of vaccines in Africa in early 2022, in May 2022 Aspen stated it might repurpose the Gqeberha site's sterile production line by July for other products. Aspen concluded an agreement with Serum Institute of India in August 2022 to manufacture, market and distribute four Aspen-branded routine vaccines for Africa, and received grant funding from the Bill & Melinda Gates Foundation and the Coalition for Epidemic Preparedness Innovations.

In December 2023, Aspen Pharmacare acquired Sandoz's Chinese business for up to €92.6 million.

== Operations ==
A global pharmaceutical company of generic drugs and specialty drugs, according to Forbes, Aspen Pharmacare Holdings Ltd. supplies both "branded and generic pharmaceutical products." Various drug products include sterile products, tablets, capsules, eye drops, suppositories, liquids, creams, and ointments. The company also develops and manufactures pharmaceutical ingredients. In 2022, 74% of revenue stemmed from trading commercial drugs, and 26% came from producing drugs. Two thirds of their revenue is from emerging market countries. In October 2021, Aspen operated "23 manufacturing facilities across 15 sites." Seven of those facilities produced active pharmaceutical ingredients and 16 produced "finished dose forms", which are drugs "in the final form for delivery to patients with a specific mixture of active- and inactive ingredients, in a particular configuration, and into a particular dose."

== Pricing investigations ==
Aspen has been criticized for aggressively increasing the prices of generic drugs it sells, leading to a number of investigations and fines. In October 2016, Aspen was fined $5.5 million by the Italian Competition Authority for price hikes initiated between 2012 and 2014 in respect to certain cancer drugs. Aspen unsuccessfully appealed the ruling, arguing that while the hikes appeared large, they resulted from "a very low and unsustainable price base." By 2016 Aspen was also being accused of the same practices, including artificially restricting supply, in the United Kingdom, Australia, New Zealand, Spain, France, Brazil, and South Africa. In a British study, it was found that Aspen's Busulfan, a cancer treatment used by the British National Health Service, had undergone a price hike of 1,143% between 2011 and 2016. Aspen argued to The Times that the price hikes had been at "levels appropriate to promote long-term sustainable supply to patients" while also arguing that shortages of cancer medicines had not been deliberate, but tied to temporary manufacturing limitations.

In October 2017, the South African Competition Commission dropped its investigation into Aspen's pricing of various cancer medicines after determining "an excessive pricing case could not be sustained against them." That year, The Guardian noted that Aspen's share value had risen significantly during the period when the price increases had been implemented, and that GSK had profitably sold its Aspen shares in three tranches. Aspen responded that the "oncology portfolio in question" had not been responsible for the majority of its generated revenue during that time, with The Times noting that the drugs generated "just 2.7%" of Aspen's R35.6-billion revenue in 2016. After an investigation by the UK's Competition and Markets Authority into arrangements Aspen made regarding the UK market for Fludrocortisone, Aspen agreed to pay the National Health Service £8 million in 2019.

After a three year investigation into Aspen's pricing of generic cancer drugs, in July 2020 the European Commission announced that Aspen had committed to a price reduction on six cancer drugs of 73% for over 10 years, while guaranteeing supply over at least 5 years to the European Economic Area sans Italy. The investigation was conducted due to rising prices for five drugs (chlorambucil, melphalan, mercaptopurine, tioguanine and busulfan). The commission found that from 2012 to 2019, Aspen had in the EEA persistently earned high profits with its average prices "exceeding costs by almost 300%" for products that had been off-patent for about 50 year. In order to prevent any further abuse of a dominant position, if Aspen intended to discontinue its supplies, the company must inform any concerned member states at least one year in advance, as well as making EU marketing authorizations for the products available for any interested third party to acquire. While Aspen had disagreed with the commission's preliminary assessment, the company "proposed commitments to the commission that would be satisfactory to all the parties involved" to address competition concerns. In February 2021, the 73% price reduction was agreed upon as binding. No fines were levied.

== FDA Findings ==
In September of 2024, the US Food and Drug Administration inspected Aspen's manufacturing site at Gqeberha in South Africa and cited Aspen for "significant violations of Current Good Manufacturing Practice (CGMP)" leading them to designate some Aspen products as "adulterated". Amongst the findings, the FDA highlighted significant concerns around the control of impurities and the risk of introducing contaminants, specifically relating to eye-drops products Aspen was manufacturing on a contract basis for distribution in the US market. In their response, Aspen notified the FDA that they would cease manufacturing the product until they could perform remediations. The FDA acknowledged this, and directed Aspen to provide a full account of all remediations prior to resuming manufacture of any products intended for the US market or the FDA would "continue to refuse admission of articles manufactured" at Aspen's Gqeberha facility.

== See also ==
- List of pharmaceutical companies
- List of companies of South Africa
- List of companies traded on the JSE
- COVID-19 vaccination in Africa
