= Dolce (magazine) =

Canadian lifestyle magazine

Dolce is a Canadian quarterly luxury lifestyle magazine for fashion, travel and auto trends. It describes itself as a lifestyle publication featuring stories of success, philanthropy, fashion and culture. The magazine has been in circulation since 1996 and is headquartered in Toronto. It is part of Dolce Media Group which founded the magazine. The sister magazine of Dolce is City Life Magazine.
