= John Nicolson (South African cricketer) =

South African cricketer

Cricket information
- Batting: Left-handed
- Bowling: Right-arm

International information
- National side: South Africa
- Test debut: 21 January 1928 v England
- Last Test: 4 February 1928 v England

Career statistics
Competition	Test	First-class
Matches	3	28
Runs scored	179	1,543
Batting average	35.79	37.63
100s/50s	0/1	3/7
Top score	78	252*
Balls bowled	24	312
Wickets	0	3
Bowling average	–	68.33
5 wickets in innings	–	0
10 wickets in match	–	0
Best bowling	–	2/36
Catches/stumpings	0/–	8/–
- Source: CricketArchive, 10 September 2022

John Fairless William Nicolson (born 19 July 1899 – 18 December 1935) was a South African cricketer who played in three Test matches in 1927–28.

Nicolson was educated at Oxford University, where he played a lot of club cricket, but made only one first-class cricket appearance, for the university against the West Indies in 1923. But in South Africa, he became a fairly regular player for Natal for five years from 1923 to 1924 as a left-hand opening batsman. His obituary in The Times stated that he was "skilful and untiring in defence and could hit hard on the leg side". His best season was 1926–27, when he scored the only three centuries of his career. They included an unbeaten 252 against Orange Free State at Bloemfontein in which he shared a first-wicket stand of 424 with Jack Siedle. Nicolson's score was, at that time, the highest ever made in South Africa and the stand remained the South African record for the first wicket until January 2020.

Nicolson was picked for the third Test against Captain Stanyforth's 1927–28 England touring team. He made 78 in the second innings, which was his highest Test score. He retained his place in the two remaining matches of the series, but was less successful in domestic South African cricket in the following season, and was not picked for the tour of England in 1929.

Nicolson retired after a couple of matches in 1929–30. At the time of his death, he had been on the staff of Mourne Grange School at Kilkeel in County Down for three years.
