= Warren Lewis (soccer, born 1971) =

South African soccer player

Personal information
- Full name: Warren Lewis
- Date of birth: 13 April 1971 (age 55)
- Place of birth: Durban, South Africa
- Positions: Defender; midfielder

Youth career
- Durban City
- Wits University
- 1991–1994: Southern New Hampshire University

Senior career*
Years	Team	Apps	(Gls)
1994–1999	AmaZulu	114	(12)
1999–2002	Orlando Pirates	68	(3)
2002–2006	Moroka Swallows	0	(0)

International career
2000	South Africa	2	(0)

Managerial career
- 2009: Maccabi South Africa
- * Club domestic league appearances and goals

Warren Lewis (born 13 April 1971) is a South African former professional football player.

== Biography ==
After a few seasons at Moroka Swallows, Lewis decided to become more religious. He chose to refrain from playing matches on the Jewish Sabbath. In 2009, Lewis coached the Maccabi South Africa side at the 2009 Maccabiah Games in Israel.

=== International ===
Lewis earned his first cap for the South Africa national football team in a 2000 COSAFA Cup semi-final match against Zimbabwe on 29 July 2000. His only other appearance for South Africa came in an Africa Cup of Nations qualifier versus Congo in Pointe Noire in September of that same year.

=== Relocated ===
In 2015, Lewis relocated to Israel.

== Honours ==
=== Club ===
Orlando Pirates (Official Tournaments)

- Premier Soccer League: 2000/01
- Top Eight Cup: 2000

=== Individual ===
Southern New Hampshire University

- NSCAA All-America: 1994
- NSCAA All-New England: 1991, 1992, 1994
