= The Real Housewives of Toronto =

Canadian reality television series

- Genre: Reality
- Based on: The Real Housewives
- Directed by: Mike Bickerton; Brett Morris; Chris Carter
- Starring: Ann Kaplan Mulholland; Gregoriane "Grego" Minot; Jana Webb; Joan Kelley Walker; Kara Alloway; Roxy Earle
- Country of origin: Canada
- Original language: English
- No. of seasons: 1
- No. of episodes: 10

Production
- Executive producers: Louise Clark; Erin Haskett; Grant Greschuk
- Producer: David Ozier
- Production location: Toronto, Ontario
- Camera setup: Multiple
- Running time: 44 minutes
- Production companies: Lark Productions; NBC Universal International Studios

Original release
- Network: Slice
- Release: March 7 – May 9, 2017

Related
- The Real Housewives of Vancouver

The Real Housewives of Toronto (abbreviated RHOT) is a Canadian reality television series that premiered on March 7, 2017 on Slice. Developed as the second Canadian installment of The Real Housewives franchise, the series aired for one season and followed the personal and professional lives of several women living in Toronto, Canada.

The series consisted of 10 episodes, the 10th being the season finale. On May 17, 2017, Slice confirmed via Twitter, that the show would not have a reunion episode at the time.

== Overview and production ==
In June 2016, it was announced that Canada would be receiving a second installment centred in Toronto. The show is the first spin-off of The Real Housewives of Vancouver. The Real Housewives of Toronto aired on Slice in spring 2017, with the first season consisting of 10 episodes. The show follows six housewives and gives an "intimate look at the luxurious lives of the city's wealthiest women, from their extravagant day-to-day escapades in Toronto to grandiose getaways to their exclusive colossal cottages in Muskoka – Ontario's playground for the rich and famous." It had been reported that filming for the first season began on July 18, 2016.

On July 19, 2016, the following day of when filming had allegedly begun, actress Ariane Bellamar made claims that she had been cast as a housewife but was let go. Bellamar alleges the termination is due to a date clash of her Caesarean section with an "all-cast retreat." She says she intends to pursue legal action. On February 9, 2017, it was announced that the cast of the 10 part series would consist of Kara Alloway, Roxy Earle, Gregoriane "Grego" Minot, Ann Kaplan Mulholland, Joan Kelley Walker and Jana Webb. Slice promoted the show prior to its premiere, through various forms of social media and throughout Toronto. The show premiered on March 7, 2017, with its final episode of season 1 airing on May 9, 2017.

== Cast ==
- Ann Kaplan Mulholland
- Gregoriane "Grego" Minot
- Jana Webb
- Joan Kelley Walker
- Kara Alloway
- Roxy Earle

== Broadcast ==
The Real Housewives of Toronto premiered on Slice on March 7, 2017, at 10 PM Eastern Time.

== Episodes ==
No.	Title	Original release date
1	"New Friends, Old Faces"	March 7, 2017
Ann and Stephen Mulholland invite some of Toronto's most interesting women to a 'procedure party.' Things get tense when it's determined they share some awkward history with some of their guests.
2	"Fasten Your Seatbelts"	March 14, 2017
After winning over most of the ladies at the "procedure party", Roxy's plans for a Tequila party with her new friends go sideways, when she is unexpectedly confronted at a dog park.
3	"Docks and Debauchery"	March 21, 2017
All the women pack their bags to head to their luxurious lakeside Muskoka retreats and attend Joan's infamous Dock Party. Everyone wonders if the rumors of debauchery, skinny-dipping and tension with Roxy ultimately scare Kara off.
4	"Midsummer's Nightmare"	March 28, 2017
While the other housewives recover from Joan's dock blow-out, Kara frets over the details of her upcoming dinner party. But even with an amazing chef, cheese flown in from Italy and specially inscribed gifts for her guests, not everything goes as planned.
5	"Bruised Egos and Broken Ribs"	April 4, 2017
The ladies throw Roxy a surprise birthday party to make up for the botched celebrations in Muskoka, but the biggest surprise comes when Kara shares the news of a recent injury, and Joan receives a hostess gift filled to the brim with meaning.
6	"All Frocked Up"	April 11, 2017
Roxy is shocked by some gossip her Lash Girl shares with her and doesn’t know what to do with the information. Meanwhile, Ann has a surprising proposal for her husband Stephen and Kara makes a charitable pitch to the other wives.
7	"The Spanish Inquisition"	April 18, 2017
Jana and Grego are reeling from the gossip Roxy shared with them and decide to take the bull by the horns, but doing so unexpectedly leads to Joan confronting Roxy at Jana’s charity event.
8	"Wish You Weren't Here"	April 25, 2017
The housewives enjoy a whirlwind trip to beautiful Barcelona, but return to Toronto to discover many unresolved issues await them.
9	"Wearing White, Seeing Red"	May 2, 2017
Joan and Kara finally confront one another at a shocking lunch. Kara further escalates the emotions when she shows up at Pierre's birthday party.
10	"Burying the Hatchet and Tying the Knot"	May 9, 2017
With Ann's wedding vow renewal fast approaching, Roxy and Jana plan a risqué stagette, but Ann is finding it hard to hear her wedding bells with all the fighting among the wives. She gathers everybody together for a "Peace Lunch" to clear the air only to find that some ladies are ready for war.
