= List of Old Hiltonians =

Hilton College is a South African private boarding school for boys located near the town of Hilton in the KwaZulu-Natal Midlands. It was founded in 1872 by Gould Arthur Lucas and Reverend William Orde Newnham as a non-denominational Christian boys school.

== Sports ==
=== International Sportsmen ===
- Note: for international sportsmen all dates refer to year of national selection

| Name | Class year | Notability | Reference(s) |
|---|---|---|---|
| Charles Hime | 1892 | South African Cricketer | |
| Rolland Beaumont | 1912 | South African Cricketer | |
| Jock Cameron | 1927 | South African Cricketer | |
| Herby Wade | 1935 | South African Cricketer | |
| Billy Wade | 1938 | South African Cricketer | |
| Jack Hart-Davis | 1945 | South African Cricketer | |
| Ian Smith | 1947 | South African Cricketer | |
| Michael Melle | 1949 | South African Cricketer | |
| John Waite | 1951 | South African Cricketer | |
| Roy McLean | 1951 | South African Cricketer | |
| Mike Macaulay | 1964 | South African Cricketer | |
| Mike Procter | 1966 | South African Cricketer | |
| Derek Crookes | 1988 | South African Cricketer | |
| Preston Mommsen | 2010 | Scottish Cricketer | |
| Ebbo Bastard | 1937 | South African Rugby Player | |
| Paul Johnstone | 1951 | South African Rugby Player | |
| Nic Labuschagne | 1953 | English Rugby Player | |
| Clive Ulyate | 1955 | South African Rugby Player | |
| Brian Pfaff | 1955 | South African Rugby Player | |
| Hentie Martens | 1994 | South African Rugby Player | |
| Gary Teichmann | 1994 | South African Rugby Captain | |
| Wayne Fyvie | 1996 | South African Rugby Player | |
| Bobby Skinstad | 1997 | South African Rugby Captain and South African Sevens Player | |
| Roddy Grant | 2006 | Scottish Sevens Player | |
| T.J.Drummond | 2010 | South African Hockey Player | |
| S.R.Coppinger | 2006 | South African Squash Player | |
| Eustace Fannin | 1937 | South African Tennis Player | |
| George Weightman-Smith | 1928 | South African Athlete in the 1928 Summer Olympics | |
| Sean Gunn | 2011 | Zimbabwean swimmer at the 2016 Summer Olympics | |
| Nicholas Spooner | 2009 | South African Hockey Player | |

=== Other Sportsmen ===
| Name | Class year | Notability | Reference(s) |
|---|---|---|---|
| Keagan Africa | | First-class cricketer, played for The Dolphins | |
| Duncan Bradshaw | | First-class cricketer, played for Marylebone Cricket Club and Oxford MCCU | |
| Marc Milligan | | First-class cricketer, played for Oxford MCCU | |
| Sven Koenig | | First-class cricketer | |
| Russel Symcox | | First-class cricketer, played for The Dolphins | |
| Sean Conway | | Endurance swimmer, first person to swim the length of Great Britain | |

== Government ==
=== South African Justices ===
| Name | Class year | Notability | Reference(s) |
|---|---|---|---|
| John Didcott | 1948 | Constitutional Court judge | |
| Arthur Chaskalson | 1948 | Constitutional Court judge, member of Nelson Mandela's defence team during the Rivonia Trial | |
| Nigel Willis | 1970 | Supreme Court of Appeal judge | |
| Eric Leach | 1969 | Supreme Court of Appeal judge | |
| John Milne | 1946 | Supreme Court of Appeal judge | |

=== Politicians ===
| Name | Class year | Notability | Reference(s) |
|---|---|---|---|
| Tim Harris | 1997 | Member of Parliament for the Democratic Alliance and Shadow Minister of Finance | |

== Armed Forces ==
| Name | Class year | Notability | Reference(s) |
|---|---|---|---|
| Sir Duncan McKenzie | | Brigadier-General. Leader of the Natal forces during the Bambatha Rebellion | |
| D'Urban Armstrong | | World War I Captain and flying ace. | |
| Reginald Hayward | | Lieutenant-Colonel and first South African to be awarded Victoria Cross in World War I | |
| Guy Jamieson | 1977 | Rear Admiral (JG) in the South African Navy | |

== Business ==
| Name | Class year | Notability | Reference(s) |
|---|---|---|---|
| David Hathorn | | Director of Anglo American and Chief Executive of Mondi Group | |
| Paul Maritz | | Senior executive at Microsoft from 1986 to 2000 | |
| Michael Pfaff | 1979 | Chief Executive of Rand Merchant Bank | |
| Bruce Hemphill | | Chief Executive of Liberty Group | |

== Arts & Literature ==
| Name | Class year | Notability | Reference(s) |
|---|---|---|---|
| Conor McCreedy | | Internationally renowned South African artist. | |
| Robert Berold | | Poet, editor and author | |
| Imraan Coovadia | 1987 | Poet and author. Winner of The Sunday Times Fiction Prize. | |
| Riky Rick | 2005 | renowned south African rapper | |

== Other ==
| Name | Class year | Notability | Reference(s) |
|---|---|---|---|
| Mike Melvill | | Test pilot for SpaceShipOne and world's first commercial Astronaut. | |
