= Kwela Books =

South African book publisher

Kwela Books is a South African publishing house founded in Cape Town in 1994 as a new imprint of NB Publishers.

== 1994-2004 ==
In the first ten years it published several books.

=== Notable publications ===
- Kafka's Curse by Achmat Dangor
- Bitter Fruit by Achmat Dangor
- Underground People by Lewis Nkosi
- The Quiet Violence of Dreams by K. Sello Duiker, 2001
- Shark's Egg by Henrietta Rose-Innes, 2000
- Vatmaar by A.H.M. Scholtz,
- Confessions of a Gambler by Rayda Jacobs, 20XX - winner of The Sunday Times Fiction Prize 2004
- Ons is nie almal so nie by Jeanne Goosen
- Kleur kom nooit alleen nie by Antjie Krog

== 2004-present ==
Post 2004 Kwela continued to publish, winning several awards.

=== Notable publications ===
- Dog Eat Dog by Niq Mhlongo, 2004 - winner of the 2005 Mar des Lettras Prize
- All We Have Left Unsaid by Maxine Case, 2006 – winner of 2007 Commonwealth Writers' Prize for Best First Book, Africa Region and joint winner of the 2007 Herman Charles Bosman Prize for English Fiction.
- Behind Every Successful Man by Zukiswa Wanner, 2008 -
- The Dream in the Next Body by Gabeba Baderoon, 2005 - winner of the 2005 Daimler-Chrysler Prize.
- The Rowing Lesson by Anne Landsman, 2008 - winner of The Sunday Times Fiction Prize 2009.
- Happiness is a Four-Letter Word by Cynthia Jele, 2010 - winner of 2011 Commonwealth Writers' Prize for Best First Book, Africa Region and the M-Net Film Prize 2011 at the M-Net Literary Awards.
- Homemaking for the Down-at-Heart by Finuala Dowling, 2011 - winner of the M-Net Prize for English Fiction 2012.
- Young Blood by Sifiso Mzobe, 2010 - winner of The Sunday Times Fiction Prize 2011, the 2010 Herman Charles Bosman Prize for English Fiction, the SALA
- Room 207 by Kgebetli Moele, 2006 - joint winner of the 2007 Herman Charles Bosman Prize for English Fiction and the University of Johannesburg Prize for debut fiction.
- Die staat teen Anna Bruwer by Anchien Troskie, 2012
- The Lazarus Effect by H. J. Golakai, 2011 - shortlisted for The Sunday Times Fiction Prize 2012.
- Moss by Mary Watson, 2004 -
- Siegfreid by Willem Anker, 2007 - winner of
- Ancient Rites by Diale Tlholwe - winner of the SALA
- Beauty's Gift by Sindiwe Magona, 2008 -
- Small Moving Parts by Sally-Ann Murray, 2009 - winner of the M-Net Prize for English Fiction 2010
- It Doesn't Have to Be This Way by Alistair Mackay, 2022 - longlisted for the 2022 British Science Fiction Association Award for best novel, listed as one of Brittle Paper's 100 Notable African Books of 2022.
