= Hathorne =

Hathorne is a surname. Notable people with the surname include:

- John Hathorne (1641–1717), American merchant and judge, son of William
- William Hathorne (c. 1606–1681), American merchant

== See also ==
- Elizabeth Manning Hawthorne (1802–1883), born Hathorne, American author, great-great-granddaughter of John
- Nathaniel Hawthorne (1804–1864), born Hathorne, American novelist and short story writer, great-great-grandson of John
- Hathorn
- Hawthorne (surname)
