= Hathorn =

Hathorn is a surname. Notable people with the surname include:

- David Hathorn (born 1962), South African businessman
- Gina Hathorn (born 1946), British alpine skier
- Henry H. Hathorn (1813–1887), American politician
- John Hathorn (1749–1825), American politician
- Libby Hathorn (born 1943), Australian writer
- Linda Hathorn (born 1982), Canadian women's soccer player
- Maitland Hathorn (1878–1920), South African cricketer

== See also ==
- Hathorn Hall, academic building at Bates College in Lewiston, Maine, United States
- Hathorne
