= Magagula =

Magagula is a surname. Notable people with the surname include:

- Dineo Magagula (born 1994), South African soccer player
- Jonathan Magagula (born 1954), Swazi boxer
- Modison Salayedvwa Magagula (born 1958), Swazi writer
- Nozipho Magagula (born 1984), South African model and physician
- Thokozile Magagula (born 1955 or 1956), South African politician
