= WHPS =

WHPS may refer to:

- Waterkloof House Preparatory School, Pretoria, South Africa
- The West Hartford Public Schools school district
- Whitchurch Highlands Public School
- White House Press Secretary
- WHPS-CD, a low-power television station (channel 15) licensed to serve Detroit, Michigan, United States
