= David Pfaff =

South African cricketer and businessman

Personal information
- Full name: David Brian Pfaff
- Born: 26 June 1966 (age 60); Cape Town, Cape Province, South Africa
- Batting: Left-handed
- Bowling: Right-arm medium
- Relatives: Brian Pfaff (father); Michael Pfaff (brother)

Domestic team information
- Years: Team
- 1991: Oxford University

Career statistics
Competition	First-class
Matches	8
Runs scored	231
Batting average	46.20
100s/50s	–/1
Top score	50
Balls bowled	12
Wickets	0
Bowling average	–
5 wickets in innings	–
10 wickets in match	–
Best bowling	–
Catches/stumpings	4/–
- Source: Cricinfo, 29 June 2020

David Brian Pfaff (born 26 June 1966) is a South African businessman and former first-class cricketer.

Pfaff was born at Cape Town in June 1966. He later studied at the University of Cape Town, before studying in England at Keble College at the University of Oxford. While studying at Oxford, Pfaff played first-class cricket for Oxford University in 1991, making eight appearances. Pfaff scored 231 runs in his eight matches at an average of 46.20, with a high score of 50.

After graduating from Oxford he went into business. Pfaff is currently the chief operating officer and chief financial officer of Truworths. His father, Brian, and brother, Michael, both played first-class cricket.
