= Keagan Africa =

South African cricketer

Personal information
- Full name: Keagan Clint Africa
- Born: 6 April 1985 (age 41); Johannesburg, South Africa
- Batting: Right-handed
- Bowling: Right-arm medium

Domestic team information
- Years: Team
- 2004–2007: KwaZulu-Natal
- Source: CricketArchive, 5 March 2017

Keagan Clint Africa (born 6 April 1985) is a former South African cricketer who represented KwaZulu-Natal between 2004 and 2007. He played as a right-arm medium-pace bowler.

Africa was born in Johannesburg and attended Hilton College. He represented the South African under-19 team at the 2004 Under-19 World Cup in Bangladesh, and took eight wickets from six matches. In his team's narrow one-wicket loss to Nepal, he scored 52 not out from ninth in the batting order, and then took 3/36 from ten overs opening the bowling. Africa made his first-class debut for KwaZulu-Natal in October 2004, and his limited overs debut just over a week later. He made semi-regular appearances over the following three seasons, and played his last game in November 2007. In total, Africa took 41 wickets from 19 first-class matches and 24 wickets from 22 limited-overs matches. His best figures for KwaZulu-Natal, 5/23 from 16 overs, came in the second innings of a Three-Day Challenge game against Border in January 2007.

== See also ==
- List of Old Hiltonians
