= Hawthorne (surname) =

Hawthorne is a toponymic surname of British and Irish origin, originally for someone who lived near a hawthorn hedge or in a place with such a name.

== Notable people ==
- Bert Hawthorne (1943–1972), New Zealand racing driver
- Bryce Hawthorne (born 2005), American football player
- Charles Stewart Hawthorne (c. 1760–1831), Barrister, M.P. for Downpatrick
- Charles Webster Hawthorne (1872–1930), American painter
- Denys Hawthorne (1932–2009), Northern Ireland actor
- Ed Hawthorne (born 1970), American football player
- Frank Hawthorne (born 1946), Canadian mineralogist and crystallographer
- M. Frederick Hawthorne (1928–2021), American chemist
- Greg Hawthorne (born 1956), American football player
- Dr. James C. Hawthorne (1819–1881), established and oversaw Portland, Oregon's Hospital for the Insane
- James Hawthorne (fl. 1951–2006), BBC controller in Northern Ireland
- Jim Hawthorne (disambiguation)
- John Hawthorne, philosopher, Waynflete Professor of Metaphysical Philosophy at Oxford University
- Julian Hawthorne (1846–1934), son of Nathaniel Hawthorne and an author
- Kim Hawthorne, American actress
- Koryn Hawthorne (born 1997), American musician and contestant from The Voice season 8
- Mayer Hawthorne (born 1979), American vocalist and musician
- Nate Hawthorne (1951–2005), American basketball player
- Nathaniel Hawthorne (1804–1864), novelist and short story writer, a key figure in American literature
- Nigel Hawthorne (1929–2001), British actor
- Phil Hawthorne (1943–1994), Australian rugby footballer
- Raymond Hawthorne (1936–2025), New Zealand theatre director
- Rob Hawthorne, English football commentator
- Robert Hawthorne (1822–1879), Irish recipient of the Victoria Cross
- Sophia Hawthorne (1809–1871), American transcendentalist painter
- Susan Hawthorne (born 1951), Australian writer, poet, political commentator and publisher
- William Hawthorne (1913–2011), British professor of engineering

== Fictional characters ==
- Angela Hawthorne, character in Coronation Street
- Christina Hawthorne, character in Hawthorne
- Sadie Hawthorne, title character from the Canadian television series Naturally, Sadie
- Dahlia and Iris Hawthorne, characters in the video game Phoenix Wright: Ace Attorney − Trials and Tribulations
- Daniel Hawthorne, character in the Hawthorne Investigates series of novels by Anthony Horowitz
- Gale Hawthorne, character in The Hunger Games
- Pierce Hawthorne, character in the television series Community
- Alisha and Izzy Hawthorne, characters in Lightyear
- Michonne Hawthorne, character in The Walking Dead
- Colonel Arnold Hawthorne, character in the motion picture The Prophecy
- Nathaniel Hawthorne, character in Bungo Stray Dogs
- Pauline Hawthorne, character in the television miniseries Little Fires Everywhere
- Jameson Winchester Hawthorne The Inheritance Games
