= Craig Higginson =

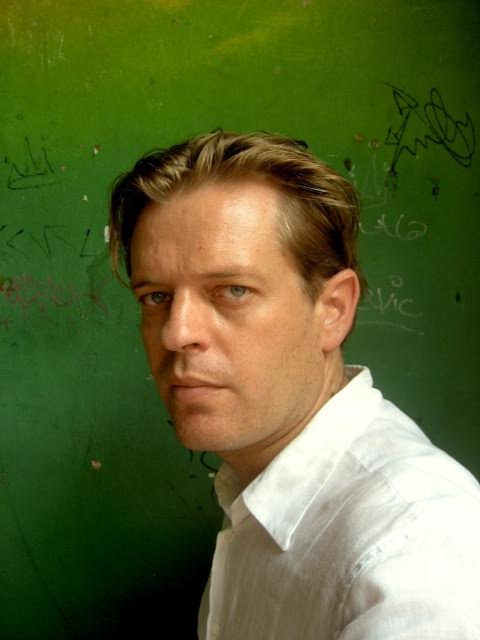

Craig Higginson (born 29 October 1971) is a novelist, playwright and theatre director based in Johannesburg, South Africa. He has written and published several international plays and novels and won and been nominated for numerous awards in South Africa and Britain.

== Life ==
Craig Higginson was born in 1971 in Salisbury, Rhodesia (now Harare, Zimbabwe). Due to the escalating situation during the Rhodesian Bush War, he moved with his mother and sister to Johannesburg, South Africa in 1976, the year of the Soweto Uprisings. At the age of ten, he attended boarding school in KwaZulu-Natal at Clifton Nottingham Road and Michaelhouse. The Midlands landscape would later feature strongly in his novels and plays.

In 1990, in the weeks that saw the release of Nelson Mandela from jail and the unbanning of the African National Congress, Higginson went to the University of the Witwatersrand to study Fine Art, but later moved to a BA (Honors) in English and European Literature. In 1995, he worked as assistant to the director Barney Simon at the Market Theatre.

Following Simon's death, he moved to England, where he would remain for ten years. There he worked at the Young Vic Theatre with Tim Supple and at the Royal Shakespeare Company with Michael Attenborough. He was also a theatre critic for some years at Time Out magazine. He published his first novel, Embodied Laughter, at the age of twenty-six in South Africa and England and adapted Laughter in the Dark for the Royal Shakespeare Company and BBC Radio 3 shortly afterwards. He returned to live and work in South Africa in 2004.

Since then, he has taught at the University of the Witwatersrand and been the Literary Manager of the Market Theatre. He has published several novels and plays and worked extensively in South African television as a writer. He has a PhD in Creative Writing and is married to the actress Leila Henriques. They live in KwaZulu-Natal, South Africa.

== Career ==
Craig Higginson is an internationally acclaimed writer and theatre director. His plays (see listing below) have been produced at the Grahamstown National Arts Festival, the Market Theatre (Johannesburg), the Royal Shakespeare Company (Stratford-upon-Avon), The National Theatre (London), the Finborough Theatre (London), the Trafalgar Studios (London's West End), the Baxter Theatre (Cape Town), the Traverse Theatre (Edinburgh), Live Theatre Company (Newcastle), the Citizens Theatre (Glasgow), the Stockholm City Theatre, the Salisbury Playhouse, Theatre 503 (London), and Next Theatre (Chicago), among others. His plays have been published by Methuen (London), Oberon Books (London) and Wits Press (Johannesburg).

Several of his plays are university set-works in South Africa and abroad. His play Dream of the Dog, starring Dame Janet Suzman, transferred to the West End after a sold-out run at the Finborough Theatre. Dominic Cavendish in The Telegraph wrote, "The Finborough has a massive, unmissable hit on its hands with Dream of the Dog … An evening fit to grab you by the throat." Higginson was one of ten playwrights from around the world to be commissioned by the National Theatre, London, for the Connections Festival 2012 to coincide with the Olympics. For this event he wrote the youth play Little Foot.

Higginson's novels include Embodied Laughter (Pan Macmillan), The Hill (Jacana), Last Summer (Picador Africa, Mercure de France), The Landscape Painter (Picador Africa), The Dream House (Picador Africa, Mercure de France), and The White Room (Picador Africa, St Martins Press, New York (audiobook)). The Landscape Painter and The Dream House both won the prestigious UJ Award for South African Literature in English and The Dream House was also shortlisted for the Sunday Times Barry Ronge Fiction Award. The Dream House is the prescribed IEB Matric set work for South African schools from 2019 to 2021.

Higginson has directed a range of theatre productions in the United Kingdom and South Africa, including Laughter in the Dark (Royal Shakespeare Company), Blood Wedding (Pegasus Theatre, Oxford), Grimm Tales and The Jungle Book (both Market Theatre, Johannesburg), The Perfect Circle (Wits Theatre) and Dream of the Dog (SAFM, Hilton Arts Festival).

Much of Higginson's writing explores different perspectives on the truth. His work increasingly explores character, plot and relationships to be sites for ambiguity and dialogue. He uses techniques from the theatre in his fiction such as differing perspectives and dramatic irony to represent the complexity of post-apartheid South African society – extending these themes to a global context in several instances. The Girl in the Yellow Dress, one of his best known works, dramatises a dialogue between Africa and Europe – the 'Third' World with the 'First' World. He uses his experience of growing up in war-torn Zimbabwe and apartheid and post-apartheid South Africa to speak back to the complacencies of contemporary America and Europe. Mary Corrigall in the Sunday Independent stated, “Higginson has crafted a complex and sophisticated piece of work that will become a new benchmark for South African theatre.”

Higginson has been celebrated by novelists Nadine Gordimer and Andre Brink. Shortly before her death, Gordimer stated "The Dream House is an open and frank exploration of human life that resonates beyond race. Looksmart is a welcome new kind of character in the constantly evolving reality of African literature."

Brink wrote, “Craig Higginson is in the vanguard of the latest and most exciting novelists in South Africa, both robust and sensitive, offering a barometer of the best to be expected from the newest wave of writing in the country”

== Works ==
=== Original plays ===
2006: Truth in Translation (co-writer)

2007: Dream of the Dog (published Wits Press 2009 (in At This Stage) and 2015 (in Three Plays), Oberon Books 2010 and 2015 (in Three Plays))

2008: Ten Bush (co-writer with Mncedisi Shabangu)

The Perfect Circle (monologue published in SA Monologues Vol. I, Junket Press 2015)

2009: The Table (co-writer with Sylvaine Strike and the Cast)

2010: The Girl in the Yellow Dress (published Oberon Books 2010, 2015 (in Three Plays))

2012: Little Foot (UK version published by Methuen in National Theatre Connections 2012, and South African version published by Oberon Books).

2015: The Imagined Land (published by Wits Press and Oberon Books under the title Three Plays).

=== Novels ===
1998: Embodied Laughter (PanMacmillan, Minerva Press)

2005: The Hill (Jacana)

2010/ 2013/ 2017: Last Summer (Picador Africa, Mercure de France respectively)

2011/2013: The Landscape Painter (Picador Africa)

2015/ 2016: The Dream House (Picador Africa, Mercure de France respectively, Audible, MacMillan, London )

2018: The White Room (Picador Africa, St Martin’s Press New York)

2020: The Book of Gifts (Picador Africa)

2023: The Ghost of Sam Webster (Picador Africa; Catalyst Press (North America))

=== Adaptations ===
2000, 2003: Laughter in the Dark (Royal Shakespeare Company, BBC Radio 3)

2005: Lord of the Flies

2008: The Jungle Book

2009: Brer Rabbit (co-writer)

=== Translations ===
2016: Maison de rêve (The Dream House, novel)

2017: L’ete dernier (Last Summer, novel)

2023: Translations of "The Dream House" and "The Book of Gifts" into Arabic. Translation of "The Dream House" into Turkish.

=== Selected essays by Craig Higginson ===
1. A Triangle of Thought: Side One with Joanna Laurens and Caridad Svich in Performance Research, Vol 9 issue 1.
2. The State of Writing in SA , The Sunday Independent Books, 11 July 2013

== Awards ==
2004: Laughter in the Dark winner of the Sony Radio Academy Gold Award as a radio play on BBC Radio.

2007: Truth in Translation (co-writer) Edinburgh Fringe First, nominated for Best South African Play at the Naledi Theatre Awards.

2008: Dream of the Dog nominated Naledi Award Best South African Play. Nominated for Naledi Award Best Director, Grimm Tales.

2009: Ten Bush (co-writer) nominated Naledi Award Best South African Play.

2011: Last Summer shortlisted for M-Net Literary Award.

The Girl in the Yellow Dress won Naledi Award for Best New South African Play. Nominated for Best South African Play - Fleur du Cap Awards.

Brer Rabbit (co-writer) nominated Naledi Award Best New South African Children's Production.

Beautiful Creatures (co-writer) won Naledi Award Best New South African Children's Production.

2012: The Landscape Painter won UJ Award Main Prize for South African Literature in English, shortlisted for M-Net Literary Award.

2016: The Dream House won the UJ Award Main Prize for South African Literature in English, shortlisted for SundayTimes Barry Ronge Fiction Award.

The Imagined Land nominated Naledi Award Best New South African Play

2024: The Ghost of Sam Webster won the Humanities and Social Sciences Award (HSS Award) for Best Fiction.

== Interviews ==
1. "Turning the Farm Novel Inside Out: Michele Magwood Interviews Craig Higginson on The Dream House", Sunday Times Magazine
2. '5 Minutes with Author Craig Higginson', Lauren McComb. O-The Oprah Magazine South Africa
3. 'Author Interview: Subverting the Farm Novel Tradition', Sue Grant-Marshall. Business Day
4. 'Interview with Craig Higginson', Author of The Dream House, Alexander Matthews. Wanted Online
5. "'A Rising Star: Craig Higginson', Karina Magdalena Szczurek", Itch-The Creative Journal
6. Book Review: The White Room by Craig Higginson' - SABC News

== Reviews ==
=== Novels ===
1. Review of The Dream House by Craig Higginson, Beverly Jane Cornelius. KZN Literary Tourism
2. Kate Turkington Reviews The Dream House by Craig Higginson, Sunday Times Books LIVE
3. Into The Gloom – Review of The Dream House by Craig Higginson. By Alexander Matthews, Aerodrome
4. SA book review: The Landscape Painter by Craig Higginson, Marianne Gray, The South African
5. Review of Maison de Rêve by Craig Higginson in Le Monde
6. Last Summer by Craig Higginson, Review. Caroline Smart, Artslink
7. Review of The White Room by Karina Magdalena
8. '“Fierce, sad, inspired” – Anna Stroud reviews Craig Higginson’s soul-stirring The White Room'

=== Plays ===
1. Dream of the Dog at the Finborough Theatre, Review. Dominic Cavendish, The Telegraph
2. Dream of the Dog review - British Theatre Guide
3. Review : The Girl in The Yellow Dress, Exeunt Magazine
4. Review; The Girl in The Yellow Dress, Edinburgh Festival
5. Review of The Imagined Land. Nigel Vermaas, Cue Magazine
6. Review of The Jungle Book, adapted by Craig Higginson. Chris Thurman

== Podcasts ==
1. 'Craig Higginson on How The Dream House is an Anti-Farm Novel' Books LIVE
2. 'Craig Higginson and Nancy Richards on The White Room' Country Life
3. 'Sue Grant-Marshall Interviews Craig Higginson' Books LIVE
