= J. J. Ncongwane =

South African author (born 1961)

Jabulane Johan Ncongwane
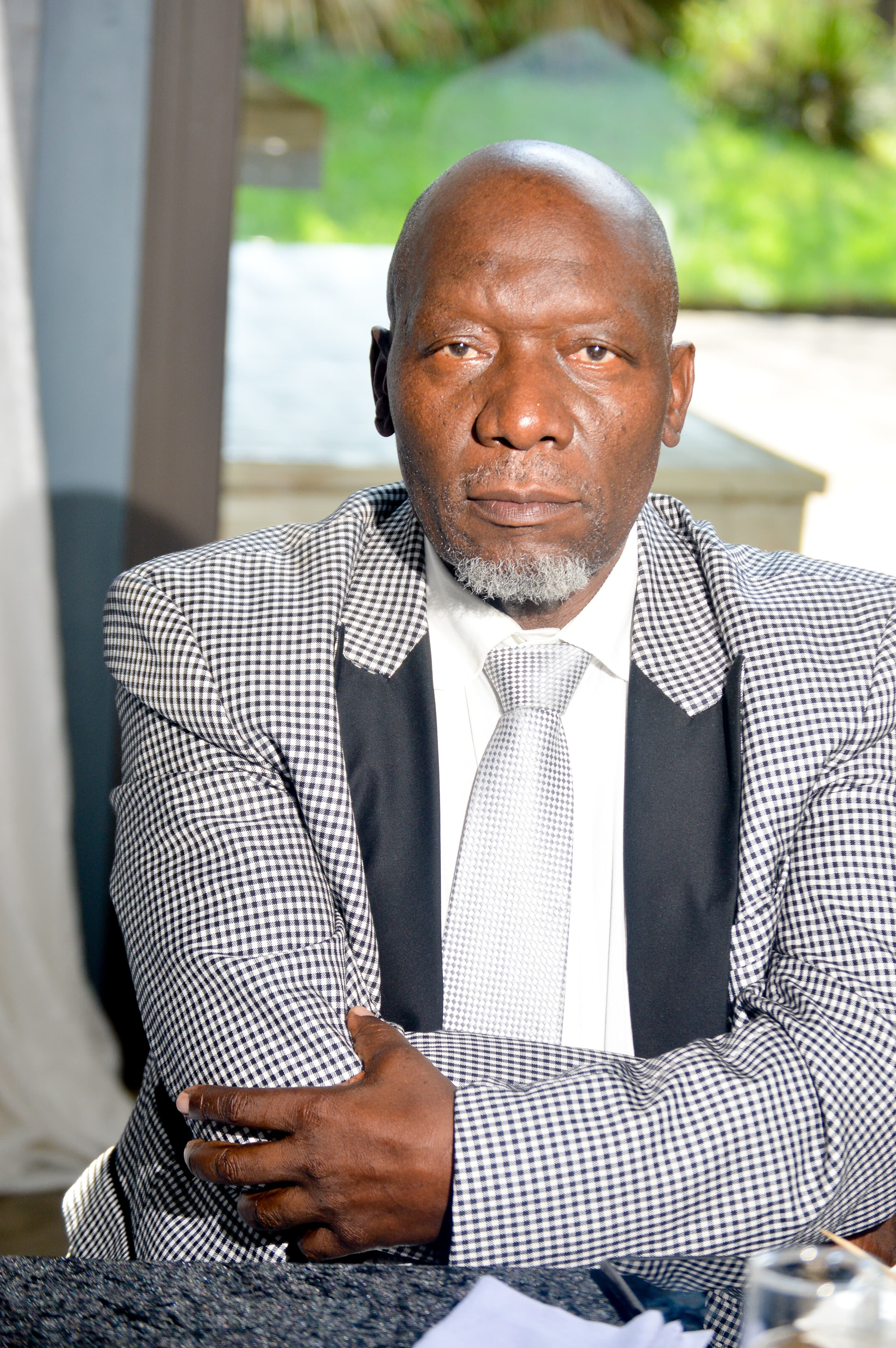
- J. J. Ncongwane in 2025
- Born: 30 September 1961 (age 64) Carolina, Mpumalanga, South Africa
- Occupation: Writer, teacher, translator
- Education: Umgwenya College, University of South Africa, University of Pretoria
- Genres: Novels, short-stories, drama and poetry
- Notable awards: Lifetime Achievement
- Spouse: Emma Zwane
- Children: Mbali Ncongwane (1988); Gugu Ncongwane (1990); Andile Ncongwane (1995); Njabulo Ncongwane (2005)
- Parents: Enoch Ngotjwa Ncongwane (1936-1977); Sonto Sarah Zwane (1925 -)
- Relatives: M. J. Ncongwane (brother); S.J. Ncongwane (brother)

Jabulane Johan Ncongwane, better known by his pen name J. J. Ncongwane (born 30 September 1961), is a South African novelist, short-story author, poet and educator who writes in Siswati. He was born at KaMagwamazi farm in Chief Albert Luthuli's Carolina area.

Ncongwane is regarded as one of the central figures in South Africa's Siswati literature. He is currently employed in the Parliament of South Africa as a Language Practitioner. He has written many Siswati books, including educational manuals, novels, short-stories, poems, and drama-plays and has co-authored several others since 1985. His work is taught at South Africa's high and tertiary schools.

== Early life ==
Jabulane Johan Ncongwane was raised at KaMagwamazi farm in Eastern Transvaal province (now Mpumalanga) in what was then Carolina District (now called Chief Albert Luthuli Local Municipality). His father, Enoch Ncongwane, was a bus-driver, and his mother, Sarah Zwane, worked as a domestic worker for the owner of the farm where they stayed. Enoch couldn't read and write but encouraged his children to read and brought home Afrikaans, English, and Zulu storybooks for them. JJ Ncongwane loved Thomas Hardy, Charles Dickens, CT Msimang, DBZ Ntuli, Maqhawe Mkhize, JJ Gwayi, and WP Steenkamp.

== Education and career ==
Ncongwane received a Teacher's Diploma from Mgwenya College and taught Siswati, Biology, and General Science at Nhlazatshe's Hlabangamehlo High School and Chief Jerry Nkosi High School between 1986 and 2007. He holds a Secondary Teacher's Diploma from Mgwenya College of Education (1985), a Degree in Arts from the University of South Africa (1996), and a Honours Degree in Arts from the University of Pretoria (1997).

He also worked at the Tshwane University of Technology as the first Editor-in-Chief for the university's Siswati Lexicography Unit that compiles Siswati dictionaries.

He has worked as a Siswati translator in South Africa's Parliament since May 2010.

His first published work was a collection of Siswati poems he co-wrote with his younger brother S.J. Ncongwane, titled Kuyophela Situnge (Beyond Boredom) in 1986.

He has translated many books into Siswati, including Lebogang Masango's children's books What Does Mpumi Eat? to Udlani Mpumi, What Does Mpumi Wear? to Ugcokeni Mpumi, and Gcina Mhlophe's Nozincwadi – Mother of Books.

== Works ==
- Ncongwane, JJ; Ncongwane, SJ (1986): Kuyophela Situnge, South Africa: Shuter & Shooter (Pty) Ltd. ISBN 978-0-86985-901-8
- Ncongwane, JJ; Sithebe, Z (1987): Emahemuhemu South Africa: Shuter & Shooter (Pty) Ltd. ISBN 978-0-7960-0043-9
- Ncongwane, JJ (1989): Tikhatsi Letimatima. Pretoria: J.L. van Schaik. ISBN 0627016065
- Ncongwane, JJ (1990): Mncwi! Ngitake Ngibone. South Africa: Educum Publishers. ISBN 0798015357
- Ncongwane, JJ; Mokoena, ZD; Mbuyane, MS (1990): Emagalelo . South Africa: Shuter & Shooter (Pty) Ltd. ISBN 9780796002570
- Ncongwane, JJ (1991): Emantjontjo. South Africa: Reach Out Publishers. ISBN 9780947457235
- Ncongwane, JJ (1991): Imihlanga Yeluhlanga. South Africa: Juta & Co. ISBN 9780702125843
- Ncongwane, JJ; Ncongwane, MJ; Ncongwane, SJ (1991): Imphilo Yimfumbe . South Africa: Educum Publishers. ISBN 0798015624
- Ncongwane, JJ (1992): Linyeva Ngelinyeva South Africa: BARD Publishers. ISBN 0947462139
- Ncongwane, JJ (1992): Ematekelo Ayitolo. South Africa. Shuter & Shooter Publishers. ISBN 0796003645
- Ncongwane, JJ (1993): Lapha Nalapho. South Africa: Palm Publishers. ISBN 0958319952
- Shongwe, JP et al (1996): Siswati Sasegcumeni 9. ISBN 0947472193
- Shongwe, JP et al (1996): Siswati Sasegcumeni 10. ISBN 0947472207
- Ncongwane, JJ. (1996): Tikhatsi Tiyagucuka. Oxford. ISBN 9780195709148
- Ncongwane, SJ (1996): Sigiya Ngenkondlo. South Africa: Shuter & Shooter (Pty) Ltd. ISBN 978-0-7960-0927-2
- Ncongwane, JJ; Ncongwane, SJ. Nyoni. South Africa: Educum Publishers. ISBN 9780798014588
- Ncongwane, JJ (1999): Letingayubuna (2003). South Africa: Acacia Books in 2003 ISBN 9780868171357
- Ncongwane, JJ (1999): Loyishayile Sewuyosile. South Africa: Heinemann. ISBN 1868538249
- Ncongwane, SJ (2005): Umshiyangculu. South Africa: Cambridge University Press. ISBN 9781108160001
- Ncongwane, JJ (2006): Ematfunti Etikhatsi. South Africa: Lutz Publishers. ISBN 9781868730780
- Translated work, Tindzaba Letikhulumako (2007). ISBN 9780980275056.
- Ncongwane, JJ (2010): Tinyembeti Tendvodza. South Africa: New Voices Publishing. ISBN 978-1-9204-1119-0
- Ncongwane, JJ. Lily waseLilydale. South Africa: Cambridge University Press. ISBN 0521137624
- Msibi, T; Magagula, HDT (2014) Sabalala Misebe. South Africa: Imisebe Publishers. ISBN 079780188X
- Ncongwane, JJ (2020): Kuyawusala Tibongo. South Africa: Blessed Seed Publishers (Pty) Ltd. ISBN 978-0-620-90905-1
- Ncongwane, JJ Telutsandvo Atipheli (School Edition). Shutter and Shooters Publishers. ISBN 9780796077219
- Ncongwane, JJ; (2017): Ngenca Yakho. South Africa: Shutter and Shooter. ISBN 9780796077226
- Dlamini, LZ; Msibi, T; Vilakati, NJ; (2016):Lukhalo Lwamanyovu: Naletinye TindzatjanaTeSiswati.ESwatini: Macmillan Education.ISBN 1852220384
- Ncongwane, JJ (2019): Kutawusho Sikhatsi. Elukwatini: Blessed Seed Publishers. ISBN 9780620833950
- Translated work Mpumi Udlani (2022): South Africa: New Africa Books.
- Translated work Mpumi Ugcokani (2022): South Africa: New Africa Books. ISBN 9781485630906
- Translated work Ngingumoya (2022): South Africa: New Africa Books. ISBN 9781485631064
- Translated work Ngingumlilo (2022): South Africa: New Africa Books. ISBN 9781485631064
- Translated work Nozincwadi (2022): South Africa: New Africa Books. ISBN 9781485631705
- Ncongwane, JJ (2020) Live Litawutsini 2nd edition. Elukwatini: Blessed Seed Publishers.ISBN 978-0-620-83311-0
- Ncongwane, JJ (2022): Kuyawush' Imifula. Elukwatini: Blessed Seed Publishers. ISBN 9780620883115
- Ncongwane, JJ; (2014): Ngingamane Ngicabuze Inja. ISBN 9781928302377
- JBC Luphoko, et al: Emanoni. ISBN 9781920412609
- Bhila, SS; Ngobe, AP (2022): Emakhono Elusha. ISBN 9780620997065
- Ncongwane, JJ (2023): Lifa Letilima. Elukwatini: Blessed Seed Publishers. ISBN 9780639763132
- Malangwane, BB; Ncongwane, JJ (2022): Letingeke Tiphuphe. Elukwatini: Blessed Seed Publisher. ISBN 9780620987912

== Awards ==
His first award was a R10 he received from Mgwenya College in 1985 for writing the short story Lunjalo-ke Lutsandvo (That is Love). This story appeared in the Mgwenya College magazine in that year and was then published in the collection of short stories called Tikhatsi Letimatima (Tough Times) in 1989.

Other awards include:

- Educum Drama Competition Award 1989 for the drama book Mncwi! Ngitake Ngibone (That Won't Happen!)
- Skotaville Publishers Bertrams VO Award for African Literature in 1990 for the novel Tikhatsi Tiyagucuka (Times Change)
- Maskew Miller Longman African Heritage Awards in 1993 for his collection of Siswati One-Act plays titled Intsatsakusa (Wee Hours)
- M-Net Book Prize in Nguni Languages in 2000 for his novel Loyishayile Sewuyosile (The One That Brings It Down Eats It)
- Nadine Gordimer Short Story Award in African Languages (SA) in 2009 for his volume of short stories book called Tikhatsi Letimatima (Tough Times)
- Mpumalanga Department of Culture, Sports & Recreations in 2023 for the category Siswati literature development
- The Book Behind Award (best novel) in 2023 for the work Live Litawutsini (What Will People Say)
- PanSALB Multilingualism Award for Siswati Literature in 2024
- Siswati Academic Book of the Year Award by Mbokodo Publishers for Ematekelo Ayitolo (Tales From Yesterday) in 2024
- Lifetime Achievement Award by Mbokodo Publishers in 2024
- Best Novel Award by the South African Literature Award for Lifa Letilima in 2024

== See also ==
- Salayedvwa Magagula
- JJ Thwala
