= Sabata-Mpho Mokae =

South African novelist

Sabata-Mpho Mokae, born on 26 October 1976, is an academic, novelist and translator from South Africa who writes in Setswana and English. He is the author of a biography: The Story of Sol T. Plaatje, published in 2010 by the Sol Plaatje Educational Trust, in which the then-Deputy President of South Africa, Kgalema Motlanthe wrote the foreword.

== Early life ==
Sabata-Mpho Mokae grew up in Taung in the North West raised by his grandparents. His debut Setswana novel Ga Ke Modisa published in 2012 won him the M-Net Literary Awards for Best Novel in Setswana as well as the M-Net Film Award in 2013. In 2014 the novel earned him the prestigious residency at University of Iowa United States of America.

== Career and works ==
Mokae is currently teaching Creative Writing in African Languages at the Sol Plaatje University in Kimberley, Northern Cape, where he is also coordinating a literary translation programme called the Repatriation of Letters. Mokae is the author of a biography, The Story of Sol T. Plaatje (2010) and Setswana novels; Ga ke Modisa, published in 2012, Dikeledi in 2014, and Moletlo wa Manong which means “Feast of the Vultures”, was published in 2018. He is a co-editor of three academic publications: Sol Plaatje's Mhudi: History, Criticism, Celebration published in 2020 with Brian Willian published by Jacana, Sol T. Plaatje: A Life in Letters published in 2020 and Revisiting Sol Plaatje's Mafeking Diary: Reconsideration and Restoration published in 2023. He is the translator of two children's books by Gcina Mhlophe from English to Setswana: Dinaane tsa Afrika (from Stories of Africa, 2016) and Semaka sa Dinaane (from Our Story Magic, 2016. He has received three South African Literary Awards (2019, 2011 and 2021), the Humanities and Social Sciences Award in 2021, the M-NET Literary Award for Best Setswana Novel (2013), and the M-NET Film Award (2013). His work, which includes writing, translating, and teaching in two languages at the university level, earned him the PanSALB Multilingualism Award in 2022.

On 20 June 2025 Mpho Mokae published his latest offering; "Lefatshe ke la Badimo" with Xarra books.

== Awards ==
- South African Literary Awards 2011.
- South African Literary Awards 2019.
- South African Literary Awards 2021.
- Humanities and Social Sciences Award 2021.
- PanSALB Multilingualism Award 2022.
