= Bill O'Hagan =

Butcher and journalist

William O'Hagan (né William Bastard; 4 June 1944 – 15 May 2013) was a British journalist with The Daily Telegraph and a butcher, known for his virtuosity in the making of top-quality sausages. He is credited with revitalizing the British sausage industry.

He was the son of Ebbo Bastard, a South African rugby union player, and took his mother's maiden name after Ebbo Bastard was murdered in 1949, when Bill was only four.
