= Gould Arthur Lucas =

Gould Arthur Lucas (14 March 1831 – 19 May 1914) was an Irish sailor in the British Royal Navy and the last living survivor of the sinking of HMS Birkenhead in 1852.

Lucas was born in Dublin, a son of the Right Honourable Edward Lucas of Castleshane, County Monaghan, and Anne Ruxton, daughter of William Ruxton, member of parliament for Ardee. He was an ensign at time of the sinking of Birkenhead.

Ensign Lucas and Lieutenant Girardot, were on watch together the night of the wreck. Both heard the night orders given to the naval officer of the watch; Lucas was afterwards always under the impression that a small grass fire high on the shore at Danger Point misled this officer into thinking it was the lighthouse at Cape Agulha. After the ship was breached, Lucas helped supervise the evacuation of the women and children in the ship's boat during the sinking of Birkenhead. Three weeks after the wreck, he posted home "an account of his experience which is of great interest. The narrative written while the circumstances were fresh in its author's memory gives us a vivid picture of the scene on that terrible night in February 1852."

Lucas retired as a captain in 1859, subsequently serving as a magistrate in Durban. Lucas together with Reverend William Orde Newnham, founded boys boarding high school, Hilton College (South Africa) in Hilton, KwaZulu-Natal in 1872. Prior to his retirement to England in 1897, he also served as Chief Magistrate at Durban. He died in 1914 in Caernarfonshire.
