= Alistair Mackay (writer) =

South African author

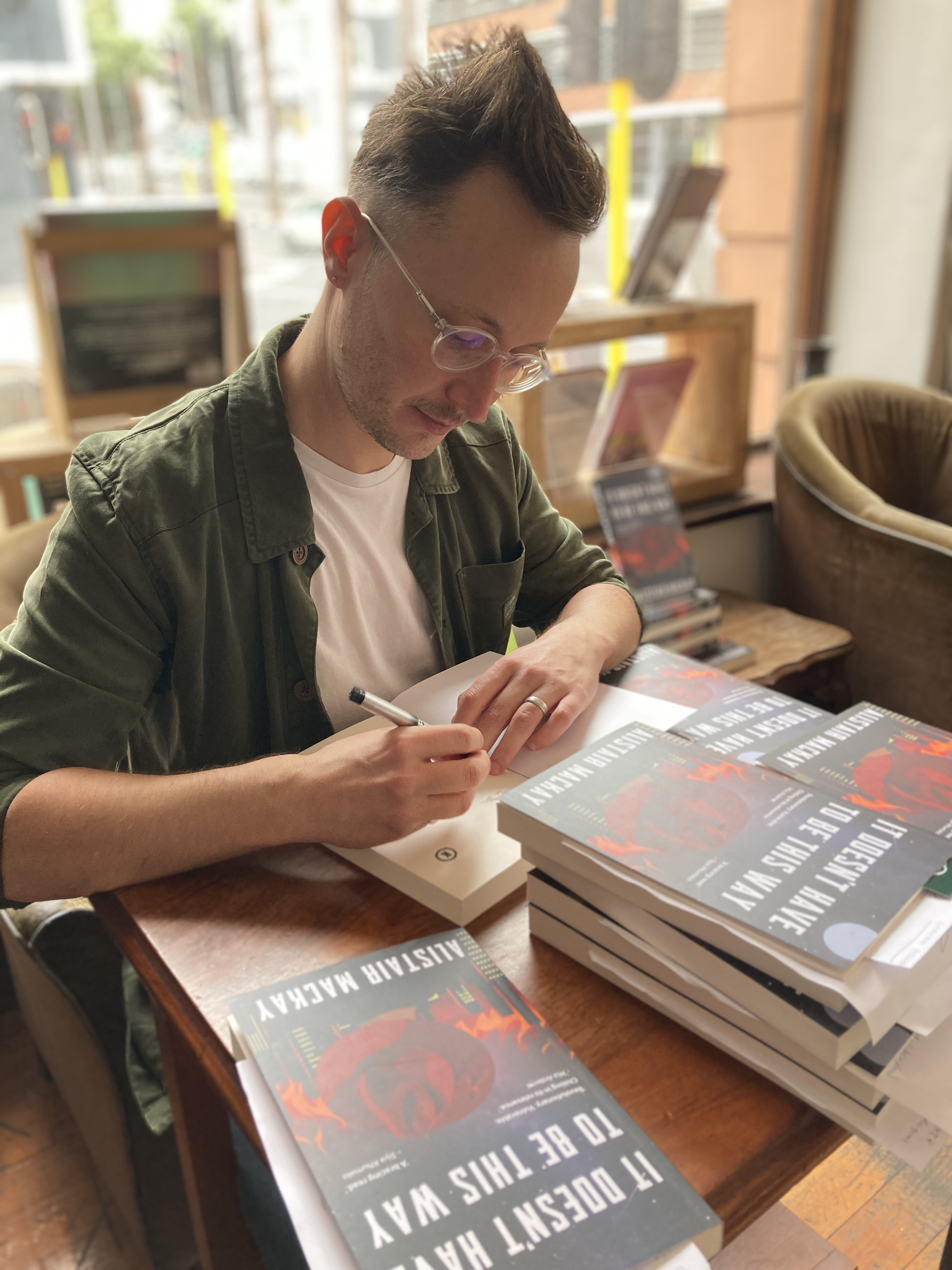
- Alistair Mackay signing copies of his debut novel, It Doesn't Have to Be This Way (Kwela, 2022), at the Book Lounge, an independent bookstore in Cape Town, South Africa (19 February 2022).
- Born: April 18, 1984 (age 42); Johannesburg, South Africa
- Education: University of Edinburgh; Columbia University
- Occupation: Author
- Years active: 2017–present
- Notable work: It Doesn't Have to Be This Way (Kwela Books, 2022)
- Parents: Graham Mackay (father); Brigid May Mackay (mother)
- Website: alistaircharlesmackay.com

Alistair Mackay (born 1984) is a South African novelist, short story writer and columnist. His debut novel It Doesn't Have To Be This Way was chosen by Brittle Paper as one of the 100 Notable African Books of 2022, and was long-listed for both the 2023 British Science Fiction Association Awards (for best novel) and the 2023 Sunday Times Literary Awards (for best fiction).

== Education ==
Mackay studied Politics at Edinburgh University, Scotland, and later completed an MFA in Creative Writing at Columbia University in New York City.

== Writing ==
Mackay's short stories have been published in Brittle Paper, New Contrast, The Kalahari Review and in the anthologies Queer Africa 2 (MaThoko's Books, 2017), which was shortlisted for a Lambda Award for best anthology in 2018 and Queer Africa: Selected Stories (New Internationalist, 2018).

His first novel, It Doesn't Have To Be This Way, was published in South Africa by Kwela in 2022.

== Bibliography ==
=== Novels ===
- The Child. Kwela Books. 2024.
- It Doesn't Have to Be This Way. Kwela Books. 2022.

=== Short stories ===
- "Going Home" in Queer Africa 2: New Stories. MaThoko’s Books. 2017. ISBN 9781928215424.
- "The King of the Jungle". Penny. Sixpenny & Co Publishing LLC. Vol 3. 2017.
- "Going Home" in Queer Africa: Selected Stories. New Internationalist. 2018. ISBN 9781780264639.
- “Why Don’t South Africans Read Fiction?” Kalahari Review. 28 June 2018.
- “Quiet as Ants”. New Contrast. Issue 184. Vol 46. Summer 2018.
- “From the List of Options”. Kabaka Magazine. 2019.
- “Fever Tree”. New Contrast. Issue 186. Vol 47. Winter 2019.
- “The Lucky Ones”. Brittle Paper. Brittle Paper. 2 March 2020.
- “Young People Problems”. adda. Commonwealth Foundation. 15 October 2020.
- “The Chair”. New Contrast. Issue 189. Vol. 50. Winter 2022. pp. 55–59.
