= JJ Thwala =

South African Siswati author (1959-2021)

- Born: Jozi Joseph Thwala; 22 April 1959; Mpumalanga, South Africa
- Died: 12 September 2021 (aged 62)
- Education: University of Venda
- Occupations: Academic, Author, Researcher
- Known for: SiSwati literature, linguistics
- Notable work: Kwahlwa emini, Insakavukela, Amaqhabanga

Jozi Joseph Thwala (22 April 1959 – 12 September 2021), also known as JJ Thwala, was a South African academic, author and linguist who made significant contributions to the development of the SiSwati language and literature.

== Early life, education and career ==
Thwala was born in 1959 in Mpumalanga, South Africa. He studied at the University of Venda, where he specialized in African languages, focusing particularly on the development and preservation of SiSwati.

He was a prolific writer and researcher who authored several books and scholarly articles in SiSwati and about SiSwati culture. He also published widely on anthroponymy, clan names and praises, and oral literature.

He held a senior academic position in the Department of African Languages at the University of Venda.

== Death ==
Thwala died of natural causes on 12 September 2021 at the age of 62. He was remembered by peers and students as a passionate educator, cultural preservationist, and literary figure. His works continue to influence studies in SiSwati linguistics, African literature, and cultural identity.

== Works ==
=== Books ===
- Kwasibekela emafu. South Africa: Shuter & Shooter (Pty) Ltd. 1987. ISBN 978-0-86985-985-8.
- Lilumbo lidla umninilo. South Africa: Van Schaik. 1987. ISBN 0627014909.
- Imilibo (in Zulu). Maskew Miller Longman. 1995.
- Umkhunsu. Aktua Press. 2008.
- Insakavukela. South Africa: Vivlia Publishers & Booksellers. 1991. ISBN 978-1-874868-10-1.
- Kwahlwa Emini (in Swati). South Africa: Vivlia Publishers & Booksellers. 1992. ISBN 978-1-874868-16-3.
- Emakhowa. South Africa.
- Emakhowa 3 (in Swati). South Africa.
- My First Multilingual Dictionary for Southern Africa with Siswati, Xhosa and Zulu Words. South Africa.
- Amaqhabanga (in Zulu). South Africa.

== See also ==
- SiSwati language
- J.J. Ncongwane
- African linguistics
- South African literature
