= It Doesn't Have to Be This Way (novel) =

2022 post-apocalyptic novel by Alistair Mackay

It Doesn’t Have to Be This Way
- Author: Alistair Mackay
- Language: English
- Genre: Literary fiction, Science fiction, Climate fiction, Speculative fiction, Dystopian fiction
- Publisher: Kwela Books
- Publication date: 2022
- Publication place: South Africa
- Pages: 264 (soft cover)
- ISBN: 9780795710322

It Doesn't Have to Be This Way is a speculative fiction novel by South African author Alistair Mackay. It was first published in South Africa by Kwela Books in February 2022. It is Mackay's debut novel set in a post-apocalyptic Cape Town.

The novel made Brittle Paper's 100 Notable African Books of 2022. It also made the longlist for best novel for the 2022 British Science Fiction Association Awards and best fiction for the 2023 Sunday Times Literary Awards.

== Plot ==
Set over a fifteen-year period from the present day to the near future, It Doesn't Have to Be This Way tells the story of three queer friends, Luthando, Viwe and Malcolm, and a young boy, Milo, as they navigate a dystopian version of Cape Town, which has been ravaged by the effects of climate change and social unrest.

The story alternates between the near future and the present. In the present day, before the Change, Luthando and Viwe meet at a reforestation festival. After a brief flirtation, and despite Viwe's difficulties in accepting his homosexuality, they begin a relationship. Luthando becomes increasingly concerned with the climate crisis, as he participates in protests and designs digital advocacy campaigns to raise awareness and prompt action. Over time, in part prompted by seclusion and a repressive governmental backlash, Luthando's environmental activism becomes radicalised leading to clashes with the government. As their lives begin to unravel, Viwe struggles with his sexuality. After his mother dies, he becomes involved in the religious end-of-days fanaticism that has become common in the city as "[g]roups of Believers impose tyrannical orthodoxy hostile to women and queers".

By this time, technological advancement and rampant social inequality have caused the city to rupture into The Citadel, a climate-controlled dome on the slopes of Signal Hill where the affluent spend much of their time lost in virtual reality, and Khapelitsha, a sprawling slum surrounding the city where the rest of the population struggle to survive. After being separated from Luthando and Viwe due to his decision to remain in The Citadel, Malcolm grapples with loneliness and increasingly intrusive technology. As he begins to fear that his work developing mental and emotional software is being used for sinister purposes, he is driven to take drastic action.

In the future, Milo shelters from the heat in a corrugated iron shack, awaiting his parents' return. He encounters an "arrival", a person who has recently arrived in Khapelitsha and is struggling with the physical effects of being disconnected from internal technology which includes partial blindness, and goes in search of his parents.

== Reception ==
It Doesn't Have to Be This Way received favourable reviews. Sanet Oberholzer of Sunday Times gave the novel a five-star rating, and called it "brutal and heartbreaking and undoubtedly brilliant". Glen Retief of the Mail & Guardian wrote that the novel's "prose is vivid, and often mesmerising, the characters tenderly drawn and vulnerable, the situations surreal and disturbing". He noted that "[i]t is also an important and intelligent contribution to the slender oeuvre of queer cli-fi focused on the developing world" and that it "deserves a wide, supportive audience". Sarah Hoek of Daily Maverick called it "an exquisitely crafted story of love and loss, identity and humanity". Jonathan Amid of News 24 described it as "an early frontrunner for the best local fiction debut of the year".

== Awards and nominations ==
It Doesn't Have to Be This Way was longlisted for best novel for the 2022 British Science Fiction Association Awards. In July 2023, it was longlisted for the best fiction award for the 2023 Sunday Times Literary Awards.
