= Jim Hawthorne =

Jim Hawthorne may refer to:

- Jim Hawthorne (DJ) (1918–2007), American radio personality and disc jockey
- Jim Hawthorne (sportscaster), American radio sportscaster for the LSU Tigers

== See also ==
- James Hawthorne (fl. 1951–2006), BBC Controller in Northern Ireland
- James C. Hawthorne (1819–1881), American physician and politician
