= Sally-Ann Murray =

South African author

- Born: 1961 (age 64–65); Durban, South Africa
- Education: University of Natal
- Occupations: Author and lecturer
- Writing career
- Language: English
- Genres: Poetry, fiction, academic research
- Notable work: Small Moving Parts
- Notable awards: M-Net Prize, Sanlam Award, Arthur Nortje/Vita Award, Herman Charles Bosman Prize

Sally-Ann Murray (born 1961) is an author from South Africa.

== Background ==
Murray was born in 1961 in Durban, South Africa, and attended the Durban Girls' High School. She received her MA and PhD from the University of Natal.

== Career ==
In 1992 Murray published her first anthology of poems entitled Shifting (Carrefour Press). Her second anthology, Open Season was published in 2006. Her first novel, Small Moving Parts, was published in 2009 by Kwela Books.

Poetry by Murray has appeared in literary journals and anthologies including, Imagination in a Troubled Space. A South African Poetry Reader (2004) and The New Century of South African Poetry (2002).

Murray has worked as a lecturer in the English Department of Stellenbosch University and University of KwaZulu-Natal. In addition to South African literature, Murray's research interests include environment, ecology, and cultural studies. She has contributed to academic journals including publishing in Critical Arts and English in Africa.

Murray has been the chair of the Poetry Africa schools' poetry programme and is an adjudicator of the Douglas Livingstone Creative Writing Competition.

== Awards ==
Murray's first poetry collection, Shifting, won the 1991 Sanlam Award and 1989 Arthur Nortje/Vita Award.

In 2009, her novel Small Moving Parts won the M-Net Prize for English Fiction. The novel also won the 2010 Herman Charles Bosman Prize and the 2013 University of Kwazulu-Natal General Book Prize. It was nominated as a Sunday Independent 'Book of the Year' in 2009, shortlisted for a Sunday Times Fiction Prize in 2010, and shortlisted for the University of Johannesburg Prize for Creative Writing.
