= Marc Milligan =

South African cricketer (born 1987)

Personal information
- Full name: Marc John Milligan
- Born: 1 August 1987 (age 39); Pretoria, Transvaal, South Africa
- Height: 6 ft 3 in (1.91 m)
- Batting: Right-handed
- Bowling: Right-arm fast-medium

Domestic team information
- Years: Team
- 2009–2011: Oxford UCCE/MCCU
- 2013: Hertfordshire

Career statistics
Competition	First-class
Matches	8
Runs scored	35
Batting average	5.83
100s/50s	–/–
Top score	13
Balls bowled	919
Wickets	14
Bowling average	42.35
5 wickets in innings	–
10 wickets in match	–
Best bowling	3/31
Catches/stumpings	4/–
- Source: Cricinfo, 8 July 2019

Marc John Milligan (born 1 August 1987) is a South African former first-class cricketer.

Milligan was born at Pretoria in August 1987. He was educated at Hilton College, before going up to Oxford Brookes University in England. While studying at Oxford Brookes he made his debut in first-class cricket for Oxford UCCE against Worcestershire at Oxford in 2009. He played first-class cricket for Oxford UCCE (and from 2010, MCCU) until 2011, making a total of eight first-class appearances. Playing as a right-arm fast-medium bowler, he took 14 wickets in his eight first-class matches at an average of 42.35, with best figures of 3 for 31. In addition to playing first-class cricket, Milligan also played minor counties cricket for Hertfordshire in 2013, making three appearances in the MCCA Knockout Trophy.
