= Modison Salayedvwa Magagula =

Swazi writer (born 1958)

Modison Salayedvwa Magagula (born 1958) is a Swazi novelist, educator, playwright, poet and short-story author. He has written some classical work, including Tentile (1990) and Bungani Bebangani (1997) which became part of the language curriculum at South Africa's schools.

== Biography ==
Magagula attended William Pitcher College in Manzini where he obtained a diploma in teaching. He began his career as a playwright in 1986 after attending a workshop for writers in the Swazi capital of Mbabane. In 1989 he started a travelling theatre called the Siphila Nje Drama Society, the first of its kind in Swaziland. He writes plays, poems and short-stories in SiSwati on themes including postcolonialism, sectarianism, juvenile delinquency, relationships and AIDS. In 2008, he received an award from the Swaziland National Council of Arts and Culture (SNCAC) for his work in the development of the arts in Swaziland.

== Also see ==
- J.J. Ncongwane

== Bibliography ==
- 1987: Ingcamu (A Journey's Provision)
- 1988: Idubukele (Dinner is Served!)
- 1989: Indlanganye (Our Gain)
- 1989: Asingeni Lapho (It is None of Our Business)
- 1990: Tentile (Hoist with your Own Petard)
- 1990: Kwesukesukela (Once Upon a Time)
- 1997: Bungani Bebangani
