= Ncedile Saule =

South African novelist, writer and academic

Ncedile Saule is a South African novelist, writer and academic.

== Career ==
Saule was born in Fort Beaufort and is from the Bhayi, Mvulane clan. Saule has written a number of notable works in Xhosa, including Unyana Womntu, which was adapted for television by the SABC in 1989, as well as Umthetho KaMthetho and Inkululeko Isentabeni. He has twice won the Nguni category in the M-Net Literary Awards.

Saule was a Xhosa lecturer at the University of South Africa from 1982 until joining Nelson Mandela Metropolitan University in around 2013. He is a Xhosa lecturer at Rhodes University.

== Awards ==
- 1997 M-Net Literary Awards, Nguni category for Ukhozi Olumaphiko
- 2011 M-Net Literary Awards, Nguni category for Inkululeko Isentabeni

== Works ==
Novels

- Unyana Womntu
- Vuleka Mhlaba
- Idinga
- Ukhozi Olumaphiko
- Indlalifa
- Umlimandlela
- Ilizwe Linjani

Textbooks

- Intaba Kamnqwazi
