= Castleshane, County Monaghan =

Village in County Monaghan, Ireland

Castleshane Caisleán an tSiáin
- Village
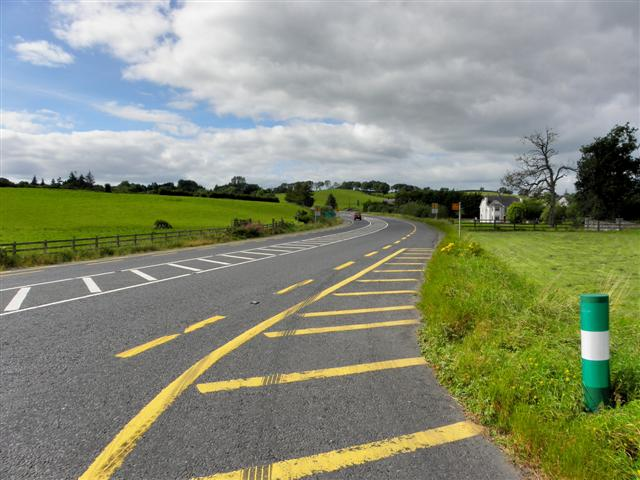
- N2 at Castleshane

- Location in Ireland
- Coordinates: 54°14′12″N 6°52′36″W
- Country: Ireland
- Province: Ulster
- County: County Monaghan

Castleshane (Irish: Caisleán an tSiáin, meaning 'castle of the fairy mound') is a small village on the outskirts of Monaghan town in the north of County Monaghan in Ireland. The village is situated on the N2, the main road from Dublin to Derry and Letterkenny, and is located approximately 6 kilometres (3.7 mi) from Monaghan town and 17 km (11 mi) from Castleblayney. It is also located approximately 3 km (1.9 mi) away from the border with County Armagh, which is part of Northern Ireland.

== Castle Shane Estate ==
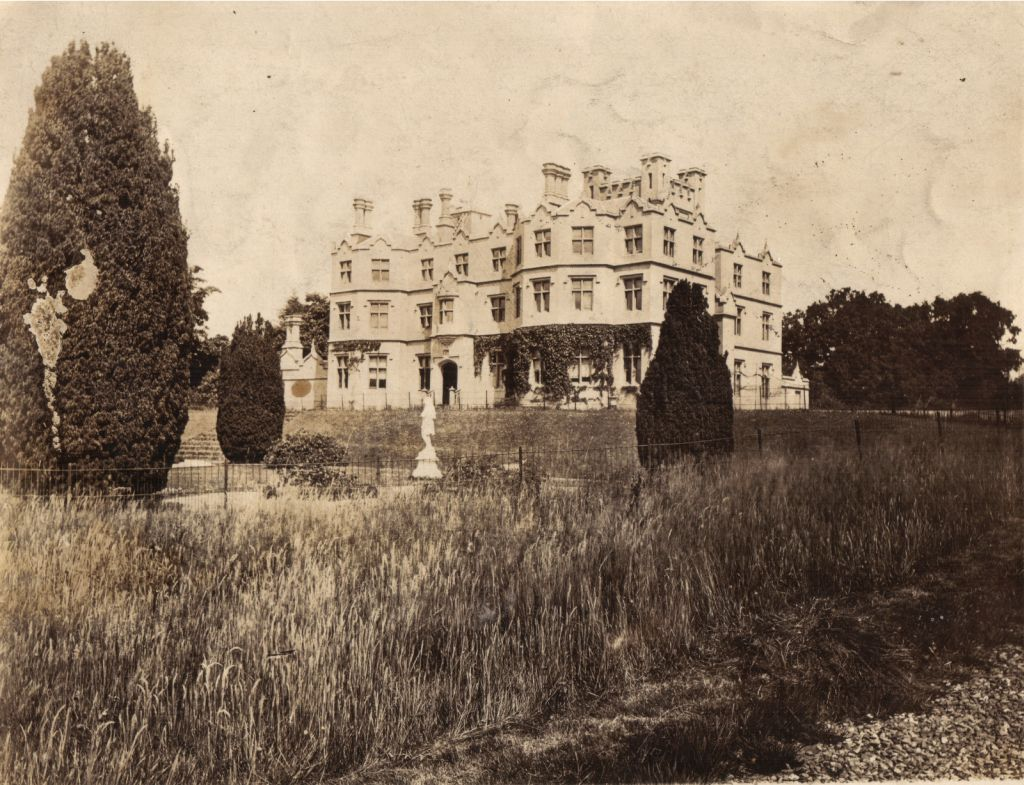
Castle Shane, a now largely demolished country house that formerly stood on the edge of Castleshane village.

The Castle Shane Estate, the former country estate in the area, was originally owned by Francis Lucas, eldest son of Henry Lucas and his second wife Alyce Bradocke. Francis was born circa 1553. His descendants held Castle Shane (spelled as two separate words), the country house on the Castle Shane Estate, for many generations. The original castle on the site may have been late medieval.

However, the castle was largely rebuilt for Francis Lucas, probably in the late Elizabethan style, around 1591. This was the architectural style chosen when the castle was rebuilt as a country house for the Lucas-Scudamore dynasty, beginning in 1836. The new country house was built in a mixture of the neo-Elizabethan style and the neo-Jacobean style. Castle Shane (the country house) consisted of a four-storey tower with corner bartizans and a main three storey block.

The mansion burned down in 1920 and very little of it remains. The house had three centre bays with three sided bays to each side with mullioned windows, curvilinear gables and neo-Tudor chimneys. All that remains is part of a three-storey bay window and gable end. There is also a gatelodge and a bellcote in the walled garden. Most of the former Castle Shane Demesne, which includes the remains of Castle Shane, the country house itself, is now mainly in ruins and belongs in majority to Coillte, the Irish forestry body.

== Notable people ==
- Patricia McKenna (born 1957), a former M.E.P. for Dublin, was born in Castleshane village.
- Gould Arthur Lucas, soldier
- Edward Lucas (1787–1871), landowner and politician
