= Ebbo Bastard =

South African rugby union player

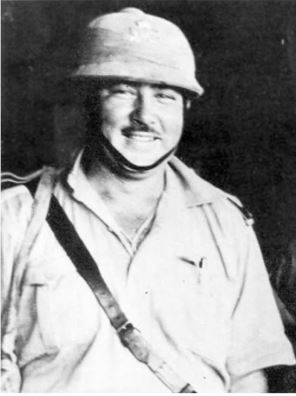
- Born: William Eberhardt Bastard; 10 February 1912 Kokstad, Natal, South Africa
- Died: 14 February 1949 (aged 37) Cedarville, Cape Province, South Africa
- School: Hilton College

Rugby union career
Amateur team(s)
Years	Team	Apps	(Points)
- Kokstad RFC
Provincial / State sides
Years	Team	Apps	(Points)
1932–1946	Natal		
International career
Years	Team	Apps	(Points)
1937–1938	South Africa	6	(6)

William Eberhardt Bastard, also known as Ebbo Bastard (10 February 1912 – 14 February 1949), was a South African rugby union player from Kokstad, Natal. He predominantly played as a flanker and played for Natal and the South Africa national rugby union team. On 14 February 1949 he was shot dead by his wife's ex-husband.

== Personal life ==
Bastard was educated at Hilton College. After leaving school, he started farming, which was his profession for the rest of his life.

Ebbo Bastard married Una Hagan in Kokstad in 1933 and had four children: Denise, Wendy, William (Billy), and Judy. Denise was killed in an accident while watching a rugby match in Kokstad in 1939. Ebbo and Una divorced when the youngest child (Judy) was 8 months and, after the divorce, Una moved to Mount Frere.

During World War II he joined the South African Army and was assigned to the Natal Mounted Rifles, seeing service with the unit in the Western Desert campaign.

== Career ==
Bastard started playing rugby for Kokstad RFC and made it onto the representative team of Natal. He was highly thought of in Natal, but when trials for the 1937 Springboks tour of Australia and New Zealand were announced at Newlands Stadium, Bastard was not invited. The Natal RFU were convinced he should be there, so they sponsored him to attend the trial without an invitation.

Following an impressive performance at the trials, Bastard was called up to the South Africa national rugby team for the tour of Australia and New Zealand, becoming the first and only Kokstad player to play for the Springboks. During his first match, he scored a try in a 9–5 win. He also scored a try against New Zealand in the second test match at Lancaster Park in Christchurch.

During the tour, his surname became a point of contention. At the first banquet of the tour in Australia, he was introduced as "Ebbo Jardine" after the English cricketer Douglas Jardine, who captained England during the infamous "bodyline" series against Australia. During Australian and New Zealand radio match commentaries, he was referred to as "one player who we shall call Smith". Following a match in Brisbane, he was spoken to by a Queensland Police Force constable who followed him, and caught Bastard and three other Springboks climbing a neon sign, which was smashed as a result. The policeman had spoken to the other Springbok players before coming to Bastard and asked for his name. Being given the name and thinking it was a joke, the policeman said, "I don't want to know what you are, I want to know who you are". Later in Sydney with Daantjie van de Vyver, a similar incident occurred when they were climbing lampposts. The New South Wales Police Force constable asked for their names; Bastard gave his and spelled it out for the policeman, with van de Vyver saying his surname straight afterward. The policeman replied, "No bastard is going to get a fiver out of me". He also played for the Springboks a year later against the British Lions in his last test match for South Africa.

=== Test history ===
No.	Opponents	Results (SA 1st)	Position	Tries	Dates	Venue
1.	Australia	9–5	Flank	1	26 Jun 1937	Sydney Cricket Ground, Sydney
2.	New Zealand	7–13	Flank		14 Aug 1937	Athletic Park, Wellington
3.	New Zealand	13–6	Flank	1	4 Sep 1937	Lancaster Park, Christchurch
4.	New Zealand	17–6	Flank		25 Sep 1937	Eden Park, Auckland
5.	(United Kingdom) British Isles	26–12	Flank		6 Aug 1938	Ellis Park Park, Johannesburg
6.	(United Kingdom) British Isles	16–21	Flank		10 Sep 1938	Newlands, Cape Town

== Death and legacy ==
When away from rugby, Bastard spent his time farming. He eventually moved to a farm in Franklin, where he lived next door to Clarice and Peter Young. During this time, Bastard made open advances toward Clarice, who later left her husband for Bastard. One night at the Royal Hotel after a match, Bastard and others had taunted Young, who left and waited for Bastard to arrive home from the party. Friends called Peter Young's sister at the farm and warned her that Peter was in a very angry state and to hide the car keys when he got home. When Peter could not find the keys, he too the tractor and drove next door to Ebbo's farm. Once Bastard got inside with Clarice, Young shot him. The Monday newspapers published the news as: "Ebbo Bastard murdered!". Young also was injured in the shooting, but was arrested and served 25 years in jail.

Ebbo left behind three children: Wendy (7), William/Billy (5) and Judy (4). Una and the children changed their names back to her maiden name, with the addition of an "O", so Una, Wendy, Billy, and Judy's names were changed from Bastard to O'Hagan. Bill O'Hagan became a journalist (Natal Witness, Cape Times, Kokstad Advertiser, Gatwick News - which he started as the first airport newspaper ever - and the Daily Telegraph) and sausage merchant.

Bastard's name is given to the "Ebbo Bastard Trophy", a rugby trophy contested by regional teams in KwaZulu-Natal.

== See also ==
- List of South Africa national rugby union players – Springbok no. 252
