= Henrietta Rose-Innes =

South African novelist and short-story writer

- Born: Cape Town, South Africa
- Occupations: Novelist and short-story writer
- Awards: Caine Prize for African Writing (2008)

Academic background
- Education: University of Cape Town; University of the Witwatersrand; University of East Anglia
- Thesis: Edgeland encounters in the South African city : stone plant: a novel (2019)

Henrietta Rose-Innes (born 14 September 1971) is a South African novelist and short-story writer. She was the 2008 winner of the Caine Prize for African Writing for her speculative-fiction story "Poison". Her novel Nineveh was shortlisted for the 2012 Sunday Times Prize for Fiction and the M-Net Literary Awards. In September of that year her story "Sanctuary" was awarded second place in the 2012 BBC (Inter)national Short Story Award.

== Background ==
Rose-Innes was "born and bred" in Cape Town, South Africa.

She has been a Fellow in Literature at the Akademie Schloss Solitude, Stuttgart (2007–08) and has held residencies at the Rockefeller Foundation's Bellagio Center; Chateau de Lavigny, Lausanne; the kunst:raum sylt quelle, Sylt; Georgetown University; the University of Cape Town's Centre for Creative Writing; Caldera Arts Center, Oregon; and Hawthornden Castle Writer's Retreat, Scotland. She is a 2012 Gordon Fellow at the Gordon Institute for Creative and Performing Arts (GIPCA), University of Cape Town. She has a PhD in Creative Writing from the University of East Anglia.

== Works ==
Novels

- Shark's Egg (2000)
- The Rock Alphabet (2004)
- Nineveh (2011)
- Green Lion (2015)

The Rock Alphabet has been published in Romanian (2007). Dream Homes: Schnappschüsse und Geschichten aus Kapstadt, collected essays and short stories, was published in German in 2008. Nineveh has been translated into French and Spanish (both 2015), and Green Lion has appeared in French as L'Homme au Lion (2016).

Short stories

- Homing (2010) (collection)

Other short pieces have appeared in a variety of international publications, including The Best American Nonrequired Reading (2011), The Granta Book of the African Short Story (2011) and Granta online.

Compilations

- Nice Times! A Book of South African Pleasures and Delights (compiled and edited by Rose-Innes, 2006).

== Awards ==
- Winner of the South African English Olympiad
- Shortlisted, 2001 M-Net Literary Award for Shark's Egg
- Shortlisted, 2007 Caine Prize
- Winner of the 2007 Southern African PEN short-story award
- Winner of the 2008 Caine Prize for African Writing for "Poison"
- Nineveh was shortlisted for the 2012 Sunday Times Prize for Fiction and the M-Net Literary Awards.
- Short story "Sanctuary" awarded second place in the 2012 BBC (Inter)national Short Story Award.

== See also ==
- List of South Africans
- List of South African writers
