= Anne Landsman =

South African-born novelist based in New York

- Born: Worcester, South Africa
- Occupation: Novelist
- Spouse: James Wagman
- Writing career
- Language: English
- Website: www.annelandsman.com

Anne Landsman (born 14 April 1959) is a novelist. She was born in Worcester, South Africa, the daughter of a country doctor, and is a graduate of the University of Cape Town and Columbia University. Until 2001, she lectured at The New School university in New York, where she still lives with her husband, architect James Wagman, and children.

She is the author of the novels The Devil's Chimney and The Rowing Lesson. The first novel developed from one of her short stories published in the American Poetry Review; the second is more autobiographical, telling the story of a Jewish South African woman.

Her novels have been published in the United Kingdom, Germany, South Africa, the Netherlands, Norway and Denmark, as well as the U.S. She has contributed essays to the anthologies Touch, An Uncertain Inheritance and The Honeymoon’s Over and has written for numerous publications including The Washington Post, The American Poetry Review, The Believer, The Guardian and The Telegraph. She has taught writing at Columbia University, Brooklyn College and The New School for Social Research. Landsman is on the board of trustees at The Writers' Room in New York City.

== Novels ==
- The Devil’s Chimney (1997) ISBN 1-56947-101-0
- The Rowing Lesson (2007) ISBN 1-56947-469-9

== Awards ==
- 2009 Sunday Times Fiction Prize,
- 2009 M-Net Literary Award
- PEN/Hemingway Award
- Janet Heidinger Kafka Prize
- Sami Rohr Prize for Jewish Literature (shortlisted)
- Harold U. Ribalow Prize (shortlisted)
