= Clifton Preparatory School, Nottingham Road =

Private school in KwaZulu-Natal, South Africa

Coordinates: 29.35722°S 29.97929°E

- Nottingham Road (Umgungundlovu District Municipality), KwaZulu-Natal; South Africa

Information
- Type: Private
- Motto: Champions of Childhood
- Established: 1942
- Locale: Rural
- Headmaster: Jason Brown
- Exam board: IEB
- Grades: 000–7
- Enrollment: 325
- Colors: Red, black and white
- Mascot: Hadeda
- Website: cliftonnotties.org.za/

Clifton Preparatory School, Nottingham Road is a private, co-educational day and boarding primary school located in the Nottingham Road area of the KwaZulu-Natal Midlands in South Africa.

== History ==
The school was founded in 1942 when a number of Clifton Durban boys moved to the KwaZulu-Natal Midlands over fears of danger during World War II.

Clifton has added Grade 000 and phased out Grade 8 which traditionally was a boys-only grade.

== Boarding ==
Clifton accepts boy and girl boarders from Grade 4 and offers boarding options, from full boarding to weekly and temporary boarding. Clifton is one of the few remaining independent preparatory schools in KwaZulu-Natal that offers full boarding to young children, with boarders coming from around the country and various Southern African countries.

== Grounds ==
The school has 60 hectares of land.

== Notable alumni ==
- Craig Higginson – author The Hill.
- Pat Cilliers – Sharks rugby player.
- David Miller (South African cricketer) – Dolphins cricket player.
- Wayne Fyvie – Sharks rugby player.
