= Brian Pfaff =

South African rugby union player

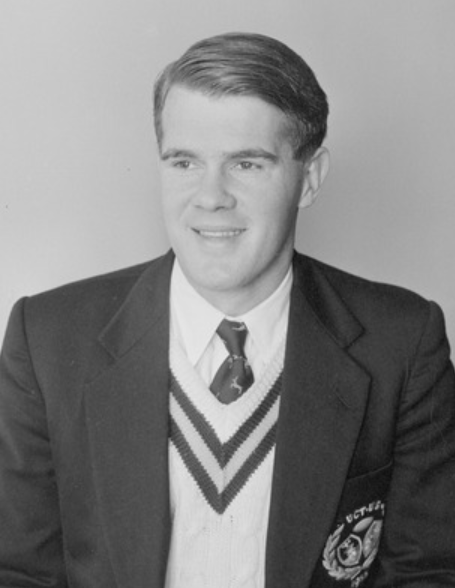
- Pfaff in New Zealand in 1956
- Born: Brian Desmond Pfaff; 2 March 1930 Durban, Natal
- Died: 8 May 1998 (aged 68) Johannesburg, Gauteng
- Height: 1.80 m (5 ft 11 in)
- Weight: 77 kg (170 lb)
- School: Hilton College
- University: University of Cape Town

Rugby union career
- Position(s): Flyhalf, Centre, Fullback
Provincial / State sides
Years	Team	Apps	(Points)
1950–1956	Western Province		
International career
Years	Team	Apps	(Points)
1956	South Africa	1	

Brian Desmond Pfaff (2 March 1930 – 8 May 1998) was a South African rugby union player and first-class cricketer.

== Rugby union career ==
Pfaff was born in Durban and attended Hilton College. At school he won colours for many sports, including rugby union and boxing. After school he went to the University of Cape Town to study accounting and played rugby and cricket for Western Province.

Pfaff made his provincial debut for Western Province in 1952 and played flyhalf and centre for the union. He toured with the Springboks to Australia and New Zealand in 1956. His first and only test match was against Australia at the Sydney Cricket Ground. On the New Zealand leg of the tour he played in three matches. Later in 1956 he captained the South African Universities rugby side on their tour of Europe.

=== Test history ===
No.	Opponents	Results (SA 1st)	Position	Tries	Dates	Venue
1.	Australia	9–0	Flyhalf		26 May 1956	Sydney Cricket Ground, Sydney

== Cricket career ==
Pfaff played first-class cricket for Western Province, making his debut during the 1952/53 season. He played in all six matches when Western Province won the Currie Cup in 1952/53. Pfaff scored 941 runs in his eighteen matches at an average of 33.60, with a high score of 78.

== See also ==
- List of South Africa national rugby union players – Springbok no. 331
