= David Hathorn =

South African businessman

David Hathorn (born 21 May 1962) is a South African based businessman and chief executive of Mondi Group.

Hathorn was educated at Hilton College and the University of Natal, where he received a Bachelor of Commerce degree. He is a qualified Chartered Accountant and Chartered Financial Analyst.

Hathorn served articles with Deloitte & Touche in Johannesburg in 1987. He joined Anglo American in 1989 as a divisional finance manager in the Corporate & International Finance Department. In 1991 he moved to Mondi to serve as finance director and then general manager of Mondi Europe. In 2000 he was appointed to his current position of chief executive officer of Mondi Group.
