= Elizabeth Manning Hawthorne =

American writer (1802 – 1883)

Elizabeth Manning Hawthorne (March 7, 1802 – January 1, 1883) was an American author of poetry, fiction, and nonfiction. She often wrote alongside and for her younger brother Nathaniel Hawthorne. She is known for her contributions to publications such as the American Magazine of Useful and Entertaining Knowledge and Peter Parley's Universal History, as well as for the vast number of personal letters that she wrote. She is noted for her skill as an editor and writer in an era when women faced difficulty in the publishing world.

== Early life ==
Hawthorne was born on March 7, 1802, to Nathaniel Hawthorne and Elizabeth Clarke Manning in Salem, Massachusetts. She spent her early years living with her mother, brother, and paternal grandmother while her father worked as a ship's captain. Called Ebe by her family, Hawthorne grew up in a household that encouraged education and reading. In 1808, when she was six years old, her father died at sea, and the family moved into her mother's childhood home with Hawthorne's maternal grandparents, aunts, uncles, and cousins. Soon after their father's death, Clarke Manning Hawthorne sent her two children to school, where they studied under the same schoolteacher for a few years before Nathaniel moved on to various private academies. Hawthorne often refused to do work that did not interest her, from chores to schoolwork other than reading or writing. Her teachers and classmates remarked at her reading ability as well as her skill in writing, noting that her accomplishments in those areas surpassed those of her peers. However, Hawthorne was often subjected to criticism of these solitary skills and habits from her family, while they approved of her younger brother's similar behavior. Despite their criticisms of Elizabeth, the family did not enforce social expectations of her. This left Elizabeth only "partially socialized," according to her peers and scholars of her brother Nathaniel. At an age where she was expected to marry, Hawthorne was described as "unpleasant," "cold, hard, and painfully proud." However, Hawthorne prided herself on her independent spirit, and many of her letters reflect an unwillingness to conform to the expectations of her family. Hawthorne remained living with the larger Manning family until she became supported by her brother. She, with her mother and sister, Maria Louisa, lived in her brother's home until after their mother's death.

== Writing and editing career ==
In her youth, most likely her teenage years, Hawthorne frequently wrote poetry, and there is a strong possibility she published some of it under an unknown pseudonym or submitted it anonymously. Nathaniel's own letters to other family members indicate that she had some experience publishing her writing, and this speculation is supported by the date of Nathaniel's letters and the family's recollection of her writing poetry during that time period. Hawthorne's career mainly consisted of her collaborations with her brother. She also considered a career as a librarian helping her brother choose books from the Salem Athenaeum and other libraries. When Nathaniel was appointed editor of the American Magazine of Useful and Entertaining Knowledge in 1836, Hawthorne acted as his co-editor for the publication. Nathaniel resigned after just six issues due to salary discrepancies, and Hawthorne never received credit for her role in the magazine's publication. In 1837, the siblings co-wrote the two volume work Peter Parley's Universal History. While scholars debate the extent of Hawthorne's involvement in the writing process, they agree that her letters with Nathaniel show her strong presence in the work; in addition, numerous scholars and several prominent libraries such as the New York Public Library indicate that she may have written the entire series by herself. These books, written for children, were attributed to author Samuel Goodrich, with Nathaniel occasionally credited and Hawthorne rarely so. Despite this, Hawthorne's writing on this project contributed to the establishment of the ideals of 19th century children's literature. These works remain Hawthorne's most ambitious writing projects, though she continued to write letters and translate books throughout her life.

== Later years and death ==
In 1850, Hawthorne moved to Montserrat in Beverly, Massachusetts, separating from her younger sister, Maria Louisa, with whom she had lived for most of her life. There she rented rooms from an elderly couple and lived in relative solitude, save for visits from family and interactions with her landlords. She functioned without running her own household, and in fact often went without necessities. However, her landlords provided her with meals, she had books to read, nature nearby, and connections with family that let her live happily despite periods of personal poverty. She lived in the same house until her death, remaining there when the previous owners died and a new family bought the house. Hawthorne died in her rooms on January 1, 1883, from the measles.

== Legacy ==
Numerous scholars have studied Hawthorne's work in context of women's publishing and writing during the nineteenth century. Literary researchers have studied her influence on her brother and his career as well as her own impact on the publishing world of the nineteenth century. Many libraries have begun to list Hawthorne as an author on works previously attributed solely to Nathaniel. Additionally, her letters have been collected and published to cement her own legacy as a writer rather than associating her with her brother's life and career.
