= William Pitcher College =

William Pitcher College (WPC) is the oldest teacher training institution in Eswatini and was founded in 1962. Located in Manzini, the school is named after a director of Education from the 1950's, William Pitcher, who was a strong proponent of educational development. WPC was the first public institutions to offer formal teacher qualifications. Prior to the founding of WPC, Christian missions that were based in the country took responsibility for schooling the majority of children. In 1970, the first teacher educator courses were approved.

== Applications ==
Applicant to WPC usually open at the beginning of the year and Close at the end of March
