= M-Net Literary Awards =

Defunct South African literary awards, (1991 to 2013)

The M-Net Literary Awards
- Country: South Africa
- Presented by: M-Net
- Reward: R50 000
- First award: 1991
- Final award: 20 September 2013

M-Net Literary Awards were a group of South African literary awards, awarded from 1991 to 2013. They were established and sponsored by M-Net (Electronic Media Network), a South African television station. The award was suspended indefinitely after the 2013 season. In the awards' fourth year, an award for indigenous African languages was inaugurated, alongside the original English and Afrikaans awards, to encourage writing in indigenous languages. In subsequent years there were six language categories, covering all eleven official South African languages: English; Afrikaans; Nguni (Zulu, Xhosa, Ndebele, and Swati); SeSotho (Sotho, Pedi, and Tswana); TshiVenda; and SeTsonga. In 2005, a Film award was introduced, for novels that novels that showed promise for translation into a visual medium. Three Lifetime Achievements Awards were also given: to Mazisi Kunene (2005), Cynthia Marivate (2006), and Mzilikazi Khumalo (2007).

== Judging criteria and history ==
In their early years, the M-Net Awards were notable among South African literary awards for considering, under their judging criteria, not only literary merit but also "strong narrative content" and "accessibility to a broad reading public." They were also, in the 1990s, the best remunerated literary awards in South Africa. From 2011, winners received a prize of R50 000, up from R30,000 in previous years.

Until 2010, the Awards were announced at the same event as the Via Afrika Awards (previously known as the Nasboek Literary Awards), which are ongoing as the Media24 Books Literary Awards.

== Award winners ==
Winners (1999–2013)
Year	Category	Winner	Work	Ref.	Notes
2013	English	Imraan Coovadia	The Institute for Taxi Poetry		Awarded 20 September in Johannesburg. (Note: A debut award for debut works in any language was awarded for the first, and only, time.) Shortlisted in the English category were: Life Under Water by Ken Barris; No Time Like the Present by Nadine Gordimer; The Land Within by Alistair Morgan; The Book of War by James Whyle
2013	Afrikaans	Ingrid Winterbach	Die aanspraak van lewende wesens		Awarded 20 September in Johannesburg. Shortlisted in the English category were: Life Under Water by Ken Barris; No Time Like the Present by Nadine Gordimer; The Land Within by Alistair Morgan; The Book of War by James Whyle
2013	Nguni	July Innocent Mtsweni	Inzinto Zyaphenduka		Awarded 20 September in Johannesburg. Shortlisted in the English category were: Life Under Water by Ken Barris; No Time Like the Present by Nadine Gordimer; The Land Within by Alistair Morgan; The Book of War by James Whyle
2013	Nguni	M.J. Mngadi	Bayeza Abanqobi		Awarded 20 September in Johannesburg. Shortlisted in the English category were: Life Under Water by Ken Barris; No Time Like the Present by Nadine Gordimer; The Land Within by Alistair Morgan; The Book of War by James Whyle
2013	SeSotho	Sabata-Mpho Mokae	Ga Ke Modisa		Awarded 20 September in Johannesburg. Shortlisted in the English category were: Life Under Water by Ken Barris; No Time Like the Present by Nadine Gordimer; The Land Within by Alistair Morgan; The Book of War by James Whyle
2013	SeTsonga	No award			Awarded 20 September in Johannesburg. Shortlisted in the English category were: Life Under Water by Ken Barris; No Time Like the Present by Nadine Gordimer; The Land Within by Alistair Morgan; The Book of War by James Whyle
2013	TshiVenda	N.M. Mphaphuli	Mbofho dza Malofha		Awarded 20 September in Johannesburg. Shortlisted in the English category were: Life Under Water by Ken Barris; No Time Like the Present by Nadine Gordimer; The Land Within by Alistair Morgan; The Book of War by James Whyle
2013	Film	Sabata-Mpho Mokae	Ga Ke Modisa		Awarded 20 September in Johannesburg. Shortlisted in the English category were: Life Under Water by Ken Barris; No Time Like the Present by Nadine Gordimer; The Land Within by Alistair Morgan; The Book of War by James Whyle
2013	Film	Karin Brynard	Onse Vaders		Awarded 20 September in Johannesburg. Shortlisted in the English category were: Life Under Water by Ken Barris; No Time Like the Present by Nadine Gordimer; The Land Within by Alistair Morgan; The Book of War by James Whyle
2013	Debut	James Whyle	The Book of War		Awarded 20 September in Johannesburg. Shortlisted in the English category were: Life Under Water by Ken Barris; No Time Like the Present by Nadine Gordimer; The Land Within by Alistair Morgan; The Book of War by James Whyle
2013	Debut	S.J. Gambu	Leqotjane		Awarded 20 September in Johannesburg. Shortlisted in the English category were: Life Under Water by Ken Barris; No Time Like the Present by Nadine Gordimer; The Land Within by Alistair Morgan; The Book of War by James Whyle
2012	English	Finuala Dowling	Homemaking for the Down-at-Heart		Awarded in October in Johannesburg. Shortlisted in the English category were: Lost Ground by Michiel Heyns; The Landscape Painter by Craig Higginson; Shooting Angels by Christopher Hope; Nineveh by Henrietta Rose-Innes
2012	Afrikaans	Sonja Loots	Sirkusboere		Awarded in October in Johannesburg. Shortlisted in the English category were: Lost Ground by Michiel Heyns; The Landscape Painter by Craig Higginson; Shooting Angels by Christopher Hope; Nineveh by Henrietta Rose-Innes
2012	Nguni	No award			Awarded in October in Johannesburg. Shortlisted in the English category were: Lost Ground by Michiel Heyns; The Landscape Painter by Craig Higginson; Shooting Angels by Christopher Hope; Nineveh by Henrietta Rose-Innes
2012	SeSotho	N.P. Maake	Manong a lapile		Awarded in October in Johannesburg. Shortlisted in the English category were: Lost Ground by Michiel Heyns; The Landscape Painter by Craig Higginson; Shooting Angels by Christopher Hope; Nineveh by Henrietta Rose-Innes
2012	SeSotho	Herbert Lentsoane	Tšhweu ya ditsebe		Awarded in October in Johannesburg. Shortlisted in the English category were: Lost Ground by Michiel Heyns; The Landscape Painter by Craig Higginson; Shooting Angels by Christopher Hope; Nineveh by Henrietta Rose-Innes
2012	SeTsonga	No award			Awarded in October in Johannesburg. Shortlisted in the English category were: Lost Ground by Michiel Heyns; The Landscape Painter by Craig Higginson; Shooting Angels by Christopher Hope; Nineveh by Henrietta Rose-Innes
2012	TshiVenda	Takalani Mbedzi	Murunzi wa Vhutshilo		Awarded in October in Johannesburg. Shortlisted in the English category were: Lost Ground by Michiel Heyns; The Landscape Painter by Craig Higginson; Shooting Angels by Christopher Hope; Nineveh by Henrietta Rose-Innes
2012	Film	Deon Meyer	7 Dae		Awarded in October in Johannesburg. Shortlisted in the English category were: Lost Ground by Michiel Heyns; The Landscape Painter by Craig Higginson; Shooting Angels by Christopher Hope; Nineveh by Henrietta Rose-Innes
2011	English	Ivan Vladislavic	Double Negative		Awarded in June in Cape Town. Shortlisted in the English category were: Zoo City by Lauren Beukes; In a Strange Room by Damon Galgut; Last Summer by Craig Higginson
2011	Afrikaans	Ingrid Winterbach	Die Benederyk		Awarded in June in Cape Town. Shortlisted in the English category were: Zoo City by Lauren Beukes; In a Strange Room by Damon Galgut; Last Summer by Craig Higginson
2011	Nguni	Ncedile Saule	Inkululeko Isentabeni		Awarded in June in Cape Town. Shortlisted in the English category were: Zoo City by Lauren Beukes; In a Strange Room by Damon Galgut; Last Summer by Craig Higginson
2011	SeSotho	K.J. Sekele	Lehutso		Awarded in June in Cape Town. Shortlisted in the English category were: Zoo City by Lauren Beukes; In a Strange Room by Damon Galgut; Last Summer by Craig Higginson
2011	SeTsonga	No award			Awarded in June in Cape Town. Shortlisted in the English category were: Zoo City by Lauren Beukes; In a Strange Room by Damon Galgut; Last Summer by Craig Higginson
2011	TshiVenda	No award			Awarded in June in Cape Town. Shortlisted in the English category were: Zoo City by Lauren Beukes; In a Strange Room by Damon Galgut; Last Summer by Craig Higginson
2011	Film	Cynthia Jele	Happiness is a Four-Letter Word		Awarded in June in Cape Town. Shortlisted in the English category were: Zoo City by Lauren Beukes; In a Strange Room by Damon Galgut; Last Summer by Craig Higginson
2010	English	Sally-Ann Murray	Small Moving Parts		Awarded 31 July in Cape Town. (Note: The Awards were announced at a separate event to the Via Afrika Awards for the first time.) Shortlisted in the English category were: To Heaven by Water by Justin Cartwright; Summertime by J.M. Coetzee; High Low In-between by Imraan Coovadia; Little Ice Cream Boy by Jacques Pauw
2010	Afrikaans	Eben Venter	Santa Gamka		Awarded 31 July in Cape Town. Shortlisted in the English category were: To Heaven by Water by Justin Cartwright; Summertime by J.M. Coetzee; High Low In-between by Imraan Coovadia; Little Ice Cream Boy by Jacques Pauw
2010	Nguni	Peter Mtuze	Iingada Zibuyile Endle		Awarded 31 July in Cape Town. Shortlisted in the English category were: To Heaven by Water by Justin Cartwright; Summertime by J.M. Coetzee; High Low In-between by Imraan Coovadia; Little Ice Cream Boy by Jacques Pauw
2010	SeSotho	M.S. Machitela	Ga di Mphelele		Awarded 31 July in Cape Town. Shortlisted in the English category were: To Heaven by Water by Justin Cartwright; Summertime by J.M. Coetzee; High Low In-between by Imraan Coovadia; Little Ice Cream Boy by Jacques Pauw
2010	SeTsonga	No award			Awarded 31 July in Cape Town. Shortlisted in the English category were: To Heaven by Water by Justin Cartwright; Summertime by J.M. Coetzee; High Low In-between by Imraan Coovadia; Little Ice Cream Boy by Jacques Pauw
2010	TshiVenda	No award			Awarded 31 July in Cape Town. Shortlisted in the English category were: To Heaven by Water by Justin Cartwright; Summertime by J.M. Coetzee; High Low In-between by Imraan Coovadia; Little Ice Cream Boy by Jacques Pauw
2010	Film	Karin Brynard	Plaasmoord		Awarded 31 July in Cape Town. Shortlisted in the English category were: To Heaven by Water by Justin Cartwright; Summertime by J.M. Coetzee; High Low In-between by Imraan Coovadia; Little Ice Cream Boy by Jacques Pauw
2009	English	Anne Landsman	The Rowing Lesson		Awarded 13 June in Cape Town.
2009	Afrikaans	Etienne van Heerden	30 Nagte in Amsterdam		Awarded 13 June in Cape Town.
2009	Nguni	No award			Awarded 13 June in Cape Town.
2009	SeSotho	Mathethe Molope	Babuši ba Lehono		Awarded 13 June in Cape Town.
2009	SeTsonga	No award			Awarded 13 June in Cape Town.
2009	TshiVenda	Tsireledzo Mushoma	Nne na inwi		Awarded 13 June in Cape Town.
2009	Film	Deon Meyer	13 Uuur		Awarded 13 June in Cape Town.
2008	English	J. M. Coetzee	Diary of a Bad Year		Awarded 15 June in Cape Town. Shortlisted in the English category were: Blood Kin by Ceridwen Dovey; After Tears by Niq Mhlongo; Plot Loss by Heinrich Troost; No Man's Land by Carel van der Merwe
2008	Afrikaans	Etienne van Heerden	Asbesmiddag		Awarded 15 June in Cape Town. Shortlisted in the English category were: Blood Kin by Ceridwen Dovey; After Tears by Niq Mhlongo; Plot Loss by Heinrich Troost; No Man's Land by Carel van der Merwe
2008	Nguni	Phakamile Gongo	Ukutshona kweHotyazana		Awarded 15 June in Cape Town. Shortlisted in the English category were: Blood Kin by Ceridwen Dovey; After Tears by Niq Mhlongo; Plot Loss by Heinrich Troost; No Man's Land by Carel van der Merwe
2008	SeSotho	M.C. Mphahlele	Dilo tšela ke batho		Awarded 15 June in Cape Town. Shortlisted in the English category were: Blood Kin by Ceridwen Dovey; After Tears by Niq Mhlongo; Plot Loss by Heinrich Troost; No Man's Land by Carel van der Merwe
2008	SeTsonga	M.C. Lubisi	Xijahatana		Awarded 15 June in Cape Town. Shortlisted in the English category were: Blood Kin by Ceridwen Dovey; After Tears by Niq Mhlongo; Plot Loss by Heinrich Troost; No Man's Land by Carel van der Merwe
2008	TshiVenda	No award			Awarded 15 June in Cape Town. Shortlisted in the English category were: Blood Kin by Ceridwen Dovey; After Tears by Niq Mhlongo; Plot Loss by Heinrich Troost; No Man's Land by Carel van der Merwe
2007	English	Shaun Johnson	The Native Commissioner		Awarded 17 June in Cape Town.Shortlisted in the English category were: Green-eyed Thieves by Imraan Coovadia; How We Puried Puso by Morabo Morojele; My Mother's Lovers by Christopher Hope; The Shadow Follows by David Medalie
2007	Afrikaans	Ingrid Winterbach	Die boek van toeval en toeverlaat		Awarded 17 June in Cape Town.Shortlisted in the English category were: Green-eyed Thieves by Imraan Coovadia; How We Puried Puso by Morabo Morojele; My Mother's Lovers by Christopher Hope; The Shadow Follows by David Medalie
2007	Nguni	Kula Siphatheleni	Elowo Nalawo		Awarded 17 June in Cape Town.Shortlisted in the English category were: Green-eyed Thieves by Imraan Coovadia; How We Puried Puso by Morabo Morojele; My Mother's Lovers by Christopher Hope; The Shadow Follows by David Medalie
2007	SeSotho	Kabelo Duncan Kgatea	Ntshware ka letsogo		Awarded 17 June in Cape Town.Shortlisted in the English category were: Green-eyed Thieves by Imraan Coovadia; How We Puried Puso by Morabo Morojele; My Mother's Lovers by Christopher Hope; The Shadow Follows by David Medalie
2007	SeTsonga	No award			Awarded 17 June in Cape Town.Shortlisted in the English category were: Green-eyed Thieves by Imraan Coovadia; How We Puried Puso by Morabo Morojele; My Mother's Lovers by Christopher Hope; The Shadow Follows by David Medalie
2007	TshiVenda	No award			Awarded 17 June in Cape Town.Shortlisted in the English category were: Green-eyed Thieves by Imraan Coovadia; How We Puried Puso by Morabo Morojele; My Mother's Lovers by Christopher Hope; The Shadow Follows by David Medalie
2007	Lifetime Achievement	Mzilikazi Khumalo			Awarded 17 June in Cape Town.Shortlisted in the English category were: Green-eyed Thieves by Imraan Coovadia; How We Puried Puso by Morabo Morojele; My Mother's Lovers by Christopher Hope; The Shadow Follows by David Medalie
2006	English	No award			Awarded at the Cape Town Book Fair. (Note: In 2005-6, each language category honoured works in different genres (short fiction, long fiction, and prose).)
2006	Afrikaans	André P. Brink	Bidsprinkaan		Awarded at the Cape Town Book Fair.
2006	Afrikaans	Marita van der Vyver	Bestemmings		Awarded at the Cape Town Book Fair.
2006	Afrikaans	I.L. de Villiers	Jerusalem tot Johannesburg		Awarded at the Cape Town Book Fair.
2006	Nguni	Nelisile Thabisile Msimang	Umsebenzi Uyindlala		Awarded at the Cape Town Book Fair.
2006	SeSotho	Mathediso Aletta Motimele	Ngwana wa Mpa		Awarded at the Cape Town Book Fair.
2006	SeSotho	Goitsemodimo L. Mancho	Wetsho ke a go rata		Awarded at the Cape Town Book Fair.
2006	SeTsonga	S.J. Malungana	Swilo Swa Humelela		Awarded at the Cape Town Book Fair.
2006	TshiVenda	No award			Awarded at the Cape Town Book Fair.
2006	Lifetime Achievement	Cynthia Marivate			Awarded at the Cape Town Book Fair.
2005	English				
2005	Afrikaans	Marlene van Niekerk	Agaat		
2005	Afrikaans	Anoeschka von Meck	Vaselinetjie		
2005	Afrikaans	Charl-Pierre Naudé	In die geheim van die dag		
2005	Nguni	S.D. Khumalo	Isiqalo Esisha		
2005	Nguni	C. Nyanda and J.J. Thwala	Intathakusa		
2005	SeSotho				
2005	SeTsonga				
2005	TshiVenda				
2005	Lifetime Achievement	Mazisi Kunene			
2004	English				
2004	Afrikaans	Dan Sleigh	Eilande		
2004	Nguni	M.J. Mngadi	Iziboshwa Zothando		
2004	SeSotho	No award			
2004	SeTsonga	No award			
2004	TshiVenda	No award			
2003	English				Awarded in Cape Town.
2003	Afrikaans				Awarded in Cape Town.
2003	Nguni	Nakanjani G. Sibiya	Kuxolelwa abanjani?		Awarded in Cape Town.
2003	SeSotho				Awarded in Cape Town.
2003	SeTsonga				Awarded in Cape Town.
2003	TshiVenda	Jemima L. Phaswana	Isha la mitodzi		Awarded in Cape Town.
2002	English				
2002	Afrikaans				
2002	Nguni				
2002	SeSotho				
2002	SeTsonga				
2002	TshiVenda				
2001	English	Zoe Wicomb	David's Story		Shortlisted in the English category were: Quiet Violence of Dreams by K. Sello Duiker; Shark's Egg by Henrietta Rose-Innes
2001	Afrikaans	Etienne van Heerden	Die swye van Mario Salviati		Shortlisted in the English category were: Quiet Violence of Dreams by K. Sello Duiker; Shark's Egg by Henrietta Rose-Innes
2001	Nguni	M.J. Mngadi	Ifa Ngukufa		Shortlisted in the English category were: Quiet Violence of Dreams by K. Sello Duiker; Shark's Egg by Henrietta Rose-Innes
2001	SeSotho	Kabelo Duncan Kgatea	Njeng manong fa ke sule!		Shortlisted in the English category were: Quiet Violence of Dreams by K. Sello Duiker; Shark's Egg by Henrietta Rose-Innes
2001	SeTsonga	N. Phaswana	Tshi do Lilwa		Shortlisted in the English category were: Quiet Violence of Dreams by K. Sello Duiker; Shark's Egg by Henrietta Rose-Innes
2001	TshiVenda	N. B. Mkhari	Mbilu ya Wanuna		Shortlisted in the English category were: Quiet Violence of Dreams by K. Sello Duiker; Shark's Egg by Henrietta Rose-Innes
2000	English				Shortlisted in the English category were: Disgrace by J. M. Coetzee; Frieda and Min by Pamela Jooste; Gods of our Time by Mongane Wally Serote; Manly Pursuits by Ann Harries; The Prodigal Husband by Lazarus Miti (Note: Shortlisted in the Afrikaans category were Boendoe by Chris Barnard, Buller se Plan by Ingrid Winterbach, Draaijakkals by George Weideman, Vos by Anna M. Louw and Wegkomkans by Marita van der Vyver; in the SeSotho category, Kodiyamalla by N.P. Maake, Lehlaba la lephako by T.W.D. Mohapi, and TsHwara thebe ka mallela by M.B. Tsolo; and in the Nguni category, Loyishayile Sewuyosile by J.J. Ncongwane.)
2000	Afrikaans				Shortlisted in the English category were: Disgrace by J. M. Coetzee; Frieda and Min by Pamela Jooste; Gods of our Time by Mongane Wally Serote; Manly Pursuits by Ann Harries; The Prodigal Husband by Lazarus Miti
2000	Nguni	J.J. Ncongwane	Loyishayile Sewuyosile		Shortlisted in the English category were: Disgrace by J. M. Coetzee; Frieda and Min by Pamela Jooste; Gods of our Time by Mongane Wally Serote; Manly Pursuits by Ann Harries; The Prodigal Husband by Lazarus Miti
2000	SeSotho				Shortlisted in the English category were: Disgrace by J. M. Coetzee; Frieda and Min by Pamela Jooste; Gods of our Time by Mongane Wally Serote; Manly Pursuits by Ann Harries; The Prodigal Husband by Lazarus Miti
2000	SeTsonga				Shortlisted in the English category were: Disgrace by J. M. Coetzee; Frieda and Min by Pamela Jooste; Gods of our Time by Mongane Wally Serote; Manly Pursuits by Ann Harries; The Prodigal Husband by Lazarus Miti
2000	TshiVenda				Shortlisted in the English category were: Disgrace by J. M. Coetzee; Frieda and Min by Pamela Jooste; Gods of our Time by Mongane Wally Serote; Manly Pursuits by Ann Harries; The Prodigal Husband by Lazarus Miti
1999	English	Mehlaleng Mosotho	The Tikeline Yuppie		
1999	Afrikaans	Christoffel Coetzee	Op soek na General Mannetjies Mentz		
1999	Nguni	Livingstone Lubabalo Ngewu	Koda Kube nina na?		
1999	SeSotho	Lazarus M. Malebana	Hlabang tlou ka diloka		
1999	SeTsonga	Conny Masocha Lubisi	I Vutomi		
1999	TshiVenda	Sampson Nditsheni Mahamba	Magala a vhahali		
1998	English	Ken Barris	The Jailer's Book		
1998	Afrikaans	Piet van Rooyen	Die olifantjagters		
1998	Nguni	M.J. Mngadi	Ashiko ndawo bakithi		
1998	SeSotho	Peter Tseole	Kgori e bona lee		
1998	SeTsonga	Gertrude Siphiwe Shabangu	N'wananga		
1998	TshiVenda	Azwianewi Elvis Maisha	Mme a nndwa dzothe		
1997	English	Zakes Mda	Ways of Dying		
1997	Afrikaans	Karel Schoeman	Verkenning		
1997	Nguni	Ncedile Saule	Ukhozi Olumaphiko		
1997	SeSotho	Ramadimetja Ruth Phasha	Ke Sehlola		
1997	SeTsonga	Ndhuma Benneth Mkhari	Nkhavi wa le Ndzhaku		
1997	TshiVenda	James Mafela	Mudi Ndi Wanga		
1996	English	Mark Behr	The Smell of Apples		
1996	Afrikaans	A. H. M. Scholtz	Vatmaar		
1996	Nguni	Rayman Fumanekile Mcimeli	Kazi ndenzeni na		
1996	SeSotho	Kgotso P.D. Maphalla	Bashemane ba Dibataolong		
1996	SeTsonga	N.R. Mgiba	Vutomi i Vhilwa		
1996	TshiVenda	Patrick Maanda Nefefe	Mato a penya mitodzi		
1995	English	Dianne Hofmeyr	Boikie, You Better Believe It		
1995	Afrikaans	Marlene van Niekerk	Triomf		
1995	Nguni	J.C. Buthelezi	Impi yabomdabu isethunjini		
1995	SeSotho	N.P. Maake	Kweetsa ya pelo ya motho		
1994	English	Justin Cartwright	Masai Dreaming		
1994	Afrikaans	Lettie Viljoen	Karolina Ferreira		
1994	Nguni	G.A. Malindzisa	Sihonga		
1994	SeSotho	N.P. Maake	Sejamonna ha se moto gete		
1994	SeSotho	S.A. Mamadi	Mahlagahlaga a Mafulang		
1993	English	John Eppel	D.G.G. Berry’s The Great North Road		
1993	Afrikaans	Marita van der Vyver	Griet skryf ‘n sprokie		
1992	English	Tony Spencer-Smith	The Man Who Snarled at Flowers		
1992	Afrikaans	John Miles	Kroniek uit die doofpot		
1991	English	Lesley Beake	A Cageful of Butterflies		
1991	Afrikaans	Jeanne Goosen	Ons is nie almal so nie		
