= Conor Mccreedy =

South African artist

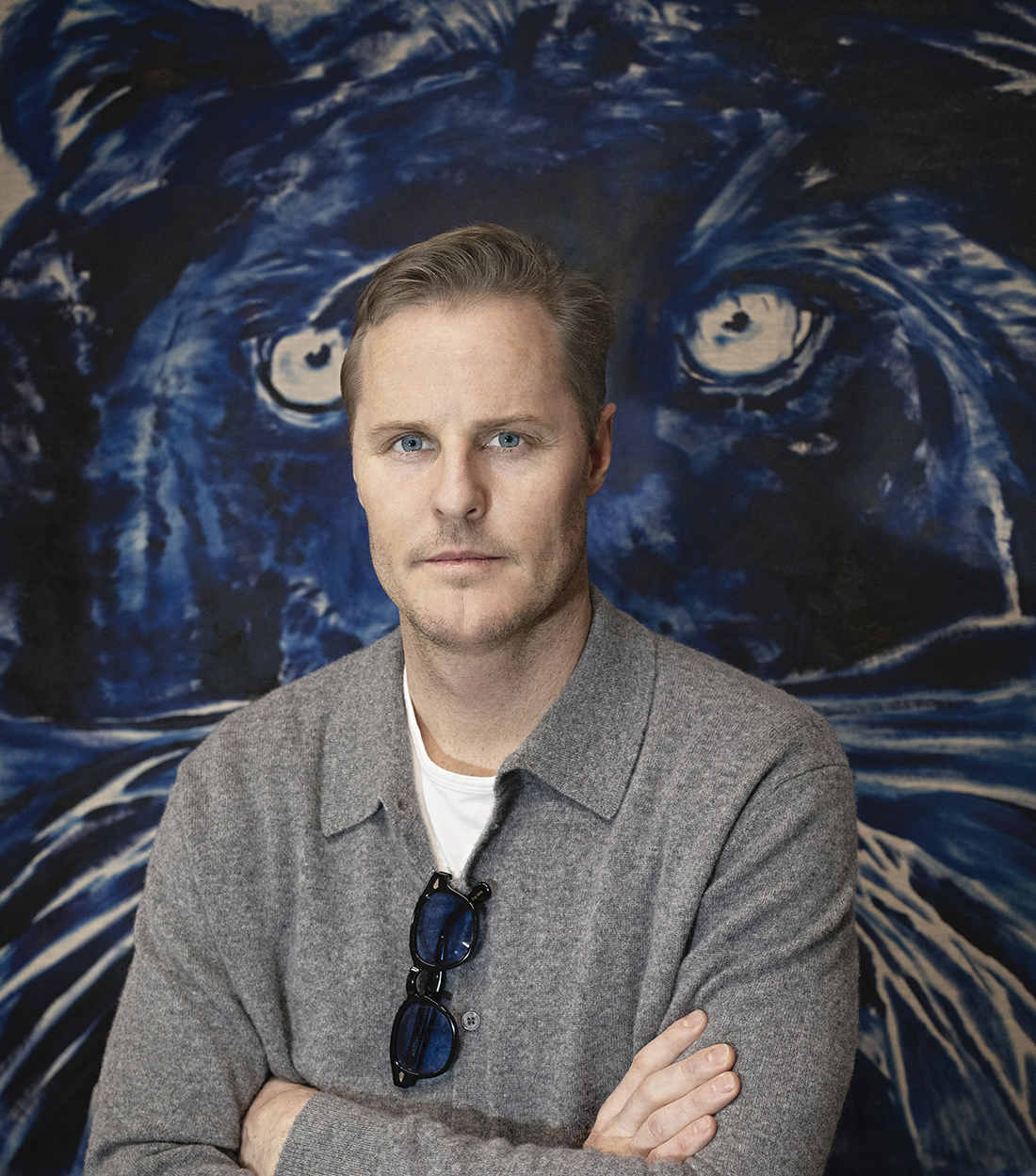
- Born: Conor Matthew Mccreedy; 1987 (age 38–39); Johannesburg, South Africa
- Education: Hilton College; Pratt Institute
- Known for: Painting, abstract expressionism
- Style: Abstract, blue, chiaroscuro
- Website: conormccreedy.com

Conor Matthew Mccreedy (born 1987) is a contemporary artist, conservationist and collector based in Switzerland. In his work, his depiction of abstraction is linked to chaos theory. The colour blue is prominent in his works.

== Personal life ==
Mccreedy was born in Johannesburg, South Africa in 1987, to a South African mother and a French-Irish father. He recalls painting at age four using his mother's makeup brush and coffee grounds. Later in his youth, he became a fashion model, working for fashion houses including Calvin Klein. He also attended Hilton College. In 2006, Mccreedy earned a golf scholarship to attend Barton College in North Carolina. Mccreedy dropped out of art school at the Pratt Institute in New York City to pursue an independent art career in 2007.

== Career ==
After dropping out of college, Mccreedy began selling his artwork on the streets of Union Square in New York City. After marketing manager Mick Rock noticed Mccreedy's work in a gallery, he urged him to talk to Aldon James Jr., the President of the National Arts Club, a private club. Mccreedy held his first solo exhibition here, titled Outliers, making him the youngest artist to have had a solo exhibition at the venue. The exhibition was composed of wildlife photography that he took in South Africa and African safari influenced paintings.

In 2011, he was commissioned by Time Warner to paint a version of its logo for a launch party using his "Mccreedyblue" colour. The colour used in all of his paintings is a combinations of five different blue pigments. In 2012 he produced the "African Ocean" exhibition at the Charles Bank Gallery, as a part of the Witness Hilton Arts Festival at Hilton College, and Selected Works, 2006–2012, at Ernie Els' estate in Stellenbosch.

Commissions of Mccreedy's work include murals painted in private New York City establishments such as the Soho House Hotel and the penthouse of the Bowery Hotel. In 2014, he had a solo exhibition at Gallery Proarta.

== Exhibitions ==
Solo exhibitions:

- "Outliers" National Arts Club. New York City, 2010.
- "African Ocean" Elizabeth Street, Charles Bank Gallery New York City, 2012.
- "Mcreedyblue" ProArta Galerie, Zurich, 2014.
- "Mccreedyblue" Cat Street Gallery, Hong Kong, 2015.
- "Chiaroscuro Abstract Portraits" HG Guggenheim Contemporary, New York City, 2016.
- "Splash Paintings" Askeri Gallery, Moscow, 2017.
- "Feelings" Askeri Gallery, Moscow, 2018.
- "Wild life Alter Ego" NetJets VIP Collector Lounge. Basel Switzerland, 2023.

In 2015, his new work formed the exhibition Mccreedyblue, held in Hong Kong, China at the Cat Street Gallery. He also held solo exhibitions in Zurich and Palm Beach. John Cole-Morgan of the South African stated of his Hong Kong exhibition that Mccreedy's work was "powerful, dynamic and genuinely hypnotic".

== Artwork ==
His painting was described by Amber Genuske in the Huffington Post as showing "fluid motion" and "expressionistic creation."

He has stated in several interviews that Pablo Picasso is one of his largest influences. Some of his pieces have been inspired by former South African president Nelson Mandela and the end of Apartheid in South Africa. In June 2013, pieces of Mccreedy's artwork were stolen from a gallery in New York City. Among the stolen pieces was a portrait of Nelson Mandela. His first Asian solo exhibition was opened in 2015. His paintings have sold for up to US$150,000. His "Mcreedyblue" is a combination of five blue pigments.

== Charity ==
During Art Basel, Switzerland in 2017, Mccreedy donated his small Houses of Parliament, London painting to the UNAIDS, United Nations foundation. The painting was auctioned off during the opening night gala dinner in Basel. Mccreedy is the founder of Protecting African Lions, an NPO set up to protecting the declining wild lion population.

Proceeds from the sale of his small 'Splash Painting' went to cerebral palsy causes, part of the Gracious Hearts Foundation. The painting was titled 'Feelings' The auction was held at Christie's in London and was auctioned off by Simon de Pury. He donated a small 'Angel Painting' to Ellerman House, Art Angels Foundation. The foundation is based in his home country. South Africa. It is an annual charity party to benefit the Click Foundation.

In 2023, Mccreedy collaborated with Swiss jewellery designer Suzanne Syz to make a 170 carat blue sapphire brooche that was incorporated into Mccreedy’s painting "Blue eyes sapphirus falco columbarius". The painting sold for ZAR8.2 million (ca. US$420,000) during Art Basel in Switzerland. Approximately ten per cent (ZAR800,000; US$40,000) of that sum was donated to Africamission's Drops of Life Campaign.

== Designs ==
Mccreedy designed an Art Bed called "My Blue Heaven".
