= Waterkloof House Preparatory School =

Location
- 535 Ruddell Street, Brooklyn; Pretoria, Gauteng 0181; South Africa; 25°46′00″S 28°13′55″E

Information
- School type: Private, day scholars & boarding from grade 3
- Motto: Work Hard, Play Straight
- Established: 1923; 103 years ago
- Locale: Urban campus
- Headmaster: Mark Whitelaw
- Exam board: IEB
- Grades: grade 000 & 00 (boys & girls), grades 0 – 7 (boys only)
- Enrollment: 460 boys
- Language: English
- Schedule: 07:30 – 14:00
- Colours: Maroon; Grey
- Website: www.whpsschool.com

Waterkloof House Preparatory School (WHPS, pronounced, and commonly known as, WHiPS) is an independent (private) primary school in Pretoria, South Africa, offering education to grade 000 and grade 00 boys and girls, and grade 0–7 boys only through the medium of English.

== History ==
The school began in 1923 with 12 pupils. The original Brooklyn House Preparatory School was on the south-east corner of MacKenzie and Alexander Streets in Brooklyn. To cope with rapidly expanding numbers, the school moved to its present seven-and-a-half acre site on Charles Street (Justice Mahomed Street), then known as Bailey's Avenue, in 1925.

The school now has 400 pupils.

== Notable former pupils ==
- Eddie Barlow, cricketer
- Elon Musk, businessperson, founder of SpaceX and CEO of Tesla Motors and senior advisor to President Donald Trump, and the head of the department of Government efficiency (DOGE)
- Neil Wheeler, Royal Air Force officer
