= Hilton College (South Africa) =

All-boys private school in Hilton, KwaZulu-Natal, South Africa

Coordinates: 29°29′31″S 30°18′04″E

- Hilton College school crest
- Hilton (Umgungundlovu District Municipality), KwaZulu-Natal; South Africa

Information
- School type: All-boys private school
- Motto: Orando et Laborando (by Prayer and Work)
- Religious affiliation: Christianity
- Established: 29 January 1872; 154 years ago
- Founder: Gould Arthur Lucas & Reverend William Orde Newman
- Sister school: St John's Diocesan School For Girls
- Exam board: IEB, Cambridge (IGCSE/IAL)
- Grades: Forms 1 to 5 (Grades 8 - 12)
- Gender: Male
- Age: 14 to 18
- Enrollment: 600 boys
- Language: English
- Schedule: 08:00 - 15:00
- Campus: Urban Campus
- Houses: Churchill; Ellis; Falcon; Lucas; McKenzie; Newnham; Pearce
- Colours: Black; White
- Song: Lift Up Your Hearts; O' Boys of Hilton
- Nickname: Hiltonian
- Rivals: Kearsney College; Michaelhouse; Maritzburg College
- School fees: R397,000 / US$21,500 (boarding & tuition)
- Feeder schools: Clifton Preparatory School; Cordwalles Preparatory School; Clifton School; Durban Preparatory School; Highbury Preparatory School; Pridwin Preparatory School; St. Peter's Preparatory School; Waterkloof House Preparatory School
- Affiliations: Cambridge International Schools; Headmasters' and Headmistresses' Conference; ISASA; International Boys' Schools Coalition
- Alumni: Old Hiltonians
- Website: hiltoncollege.com

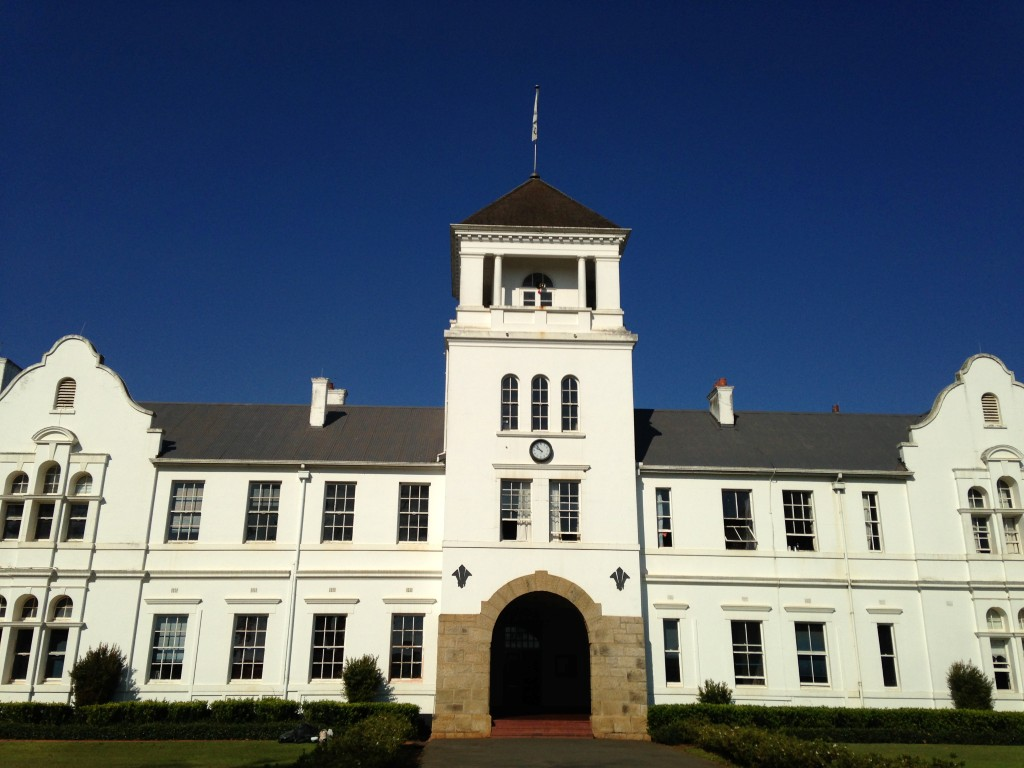
Main administrative block

Hilton College, more commonly referred to as Hilton, is a South African private boarding school for boys located near the town of Hilton in the KwaZulu-Natal Midlands. It is situated on a 1,762 ha (4,350 acre) estate that includes a 550 ha (1,400 acre) wildlife reserve and the 150 ha (370 acre) school campus.

Hilton College was founded in 1872 by Gould Arthur Lucas and Reverend William Orde Newnham as a non-denominational Christian boys' school. It follows English public school tradition and is a full boarding school, which means all pupils live at the school, and is one of only two such remaining single-sex boys' schools (the other being Michaelhouse) to continue this practice in South Africa.

Hilton's 500 pupils each have access to a personal tutor and have a bespoke academic plan. It has maintained its position as the most expensive school in South Africa.

== History ==
=== Establishment ===
The grounds on which Hilton College is located were established as farm by pioneering Voortrekkers. Ongegund, as it was then known, was sold to a young Englishman, Joseph Henderson, by Johanna Grobbelaar, widow of the original owner, in 1849. Later in 1857 Henderson and his wife renamed the farm Hilton, after Hilton Hall in Staffordshire, England.

The first of the founders, Gould Arthur Lucas, left for South Africa in 1851 as a lieutenant of the 73rd Foot Regiment of The British army. He had been one of three surviving officers during the sinking of HMS Birkenhead, in 1852. Following this he was reposted as a district adjutant in Pietermaritzburg. It was here in 1855 that he met the Rev. William Orde Newnham, who had arrived in Natal at the request of Bishop John Colenso to become master of the new Pietermaritzburg Grammar School. It was during this time that the two became close friends. In 1867, after a period in England, Newnham returned to Natal and left to establish a school in Ladysmith, with the encouragement and support of his friend Lucas.

However the school did not prosper and Newnham found "the summer climate there too oppressive". In 1871, upon hearing of Newnham's troubles, Lucas offered to help establish a new school near Pietermaritzburg. He arranged to purchase part of the farm Hilton from the Hendersons on which a school could be founded. Newnham arrived at Hilton on 27 January 1872 and two days later, on 29 January 1872, Hilton College was officially opened. The first 50 pupils were housed in dormitories built near the stables and the original farm house was enlarged to serve as the main school building. Newnham continued to run the school until he returned to England at the end of 1877.

=== Modernisation ===
In 1878 the lease of the school was taken over by Henry Vaughan Ellis. Ellis, a Rugby old boy, sought to reform Hilton College around the English public school system. Ellis brought many of the Rugby traditions to Hilton; thus beginning an unofficial link between the two schools, perpetuated today in the Hilton crest and motto. In 1903, Ellis announced his intent to retire, but wished to ensure the survival of his school. It was suggested to him by Ernest Acutt, a founding pupil and Mayor of Durban, that the farm and school should be sold to a company formed by Old Hiltonians which became the Hilton College Ltd. The capital raised by the old boys was intended to be used to buy the school from Ellis and for the construction of new buildings.

Shortly after Ellis' retirement the position of headmaster was taken over by George Weeks. However he too resigned that year and another new headmaster was needed. The position was awarded to William Falcon in 1906. Under his headmastership Hilton College grew from 50 pupils to over 200. Many buildings were completed such as the William Campbell building and the school chapel. The original school buildings, which were red brick, were changed to the present Cape Dutch style. The present school uniform was introduced along with the house system (the first three houses being Newnham, Ellis and Weeks (later renamed Pearce). Falcon also lead reforms in the school's academic curriculum and, foreseeing the inevitable union of the South African colonies, replaced French with Dutch as the official second language in 1907.

On 31 March 1928 the original shareholders of Hilton College Ltd. signed a Solemn Covenant of Dedication which, in 1930, established the Hiltonian Society, a non-profit sharing association of the Old Hiltonians which take over the original shares and thus would own and control the school.

=== Relationship with Michaelhouse ===
Hilton College and Michaelhouse have enjoyed a history of friendly rivalry. The two schools have much in common and are the only two full boarding schools remaining in South Africa. The schools are located near one another in the KwaZulu-Natal Midlands.

The bond between Hilton's "old friend and rival, Michaelhouse" has developed since 1904 when the two schools played their first rugby match at Hilton College, which Hilton won 11–0. Both schools consider each other their main fixture in all sporting disciplines. The high point of this rivalry is the biannual Hilton-Michaelhouse Day. This event, held alternately between the two schools, sees them play one another in rugby and hockey. The culmination of the day is the main rugby match between the two schools' 1st XVs, which is the oldest continuous rugby fixture in Kwa-Zulu Natal.

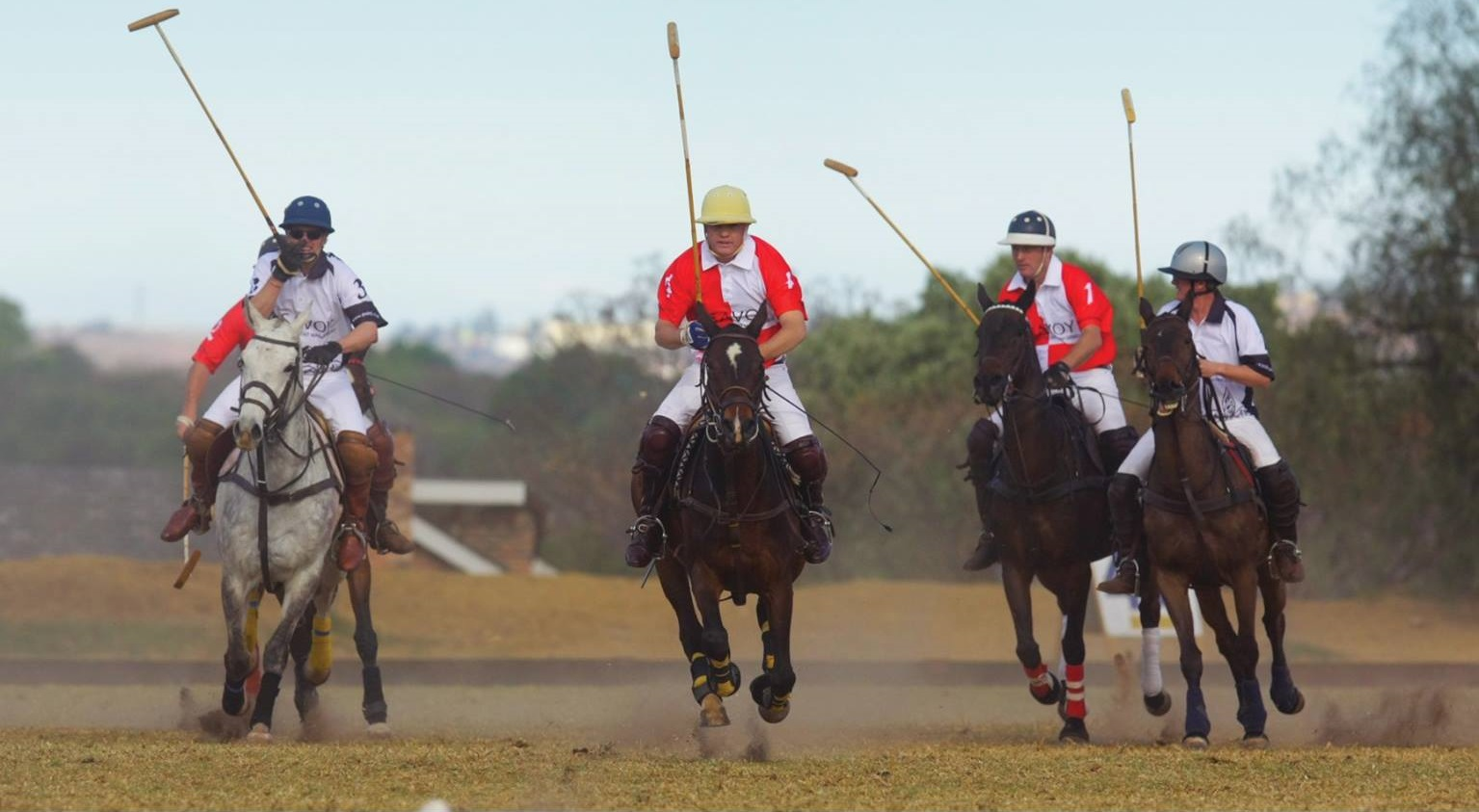
Hilton and Michaelhouse Old Boys competing in the Hilton Michaelhouse Polo Cup

=== Hilton College Guard ===
The Hilton College Guard was a mounted unit established on 4 June 1872 by Rev. William Newnham and lasted until its disbanding in the mid-1980s. As the oldest cadet corps in South Africa, the Hilton College Guard enjoyed the position of Cadet Detachment No. 1. Since its establishment, members of the Hilton College Guard and Old Hiltonians have fought in the Anglo-Zulu War, the South African War, World War I, World War II, the Korean War and the South African Border War.

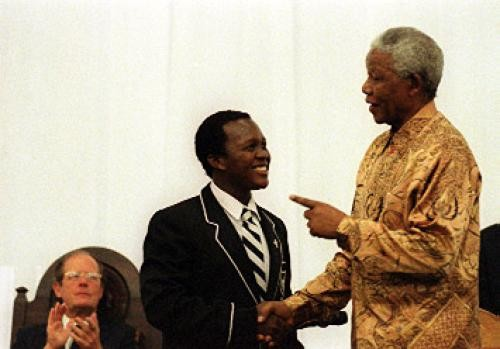
Former President Nelson Mandela at the Hilton College Speech Day, 2001

=== Headmasters ===
- W.O. Newnham (1872–1877)
- H.V. Ellis (1878–1904)
- G.E. Weeks (1905–1906)
- W. Falcon (1906–1933)
- T.W. Mansergh (1934–1947)
- J.A. Pateman (1947–1953)
- J.W. Hudson (1953–1957)
- E.L. Harison (1958–1967)
- R.G. Slater (1967–1980)
- R.H. Todd (1981–1983)
- D.V. Ducasse (1984–1986)
- P.W. Marsh (1987–1993)
- M.J. Nicholson (1994–2007)
- D.C.P. Lovatt (2008–2009)
- G.M. Thomson (2009–2012)
- P.B. Ducasse (2013–2016)
- G.J. Harris (2017- )

== Academics ==
The years of study at Hilton are referred to as Forms 1 to 5. "First Form" is the equivalent of Grade 8 and has boys aged 14. "Fifth Form" is the equivalent of Grade 12, also known as matric, and has boys aged 17–19. In Forms 1 and 2, Hilton College pupils follow a bespoke, semesterised curriculum that draws content and structure from the best curricular practices in South Africa and globally. In Form 3, pupils choose to follow either the IEB Pathway or the A Level Pathway. As such, Hilton College leavers write either the Independent Examinations Board exams or a set of International A Level exams (Cambridge Assessment International Education). Hilton has produced over 20 Rhodes scholars for study at the University of Oxford and two Elsie Ballot scholars for study at the University of Cambridge. Hilton College students can also be found in the USA ivy league universities. Harvard University has 1 Hilton College student currently (2019) studying Computer science and Philosophy, in second year. He is joined by a second Hilton student in August/September 2019.He plans to major in Social Sciences with a view to going to Harvard Law School. In addition, another Hilton College student began at the University of Pennsylvania in August 2018 studying Finance and Behavioral Economics at Wharton School of Business. Two students have been accepted to University of Pennsylvania and have started in August/September 2019. Currently (2023), there is one student in second year at Princeton University, one student in his third year at Brown University and recently (2018) a Hilton student graduated in public health from Cornell University. Two Hilton students who matriculated in 2019 have been accepted for undergraduate degrees at Harvard University have begun in August/September 2020.

== School life ==
=== Sports ===
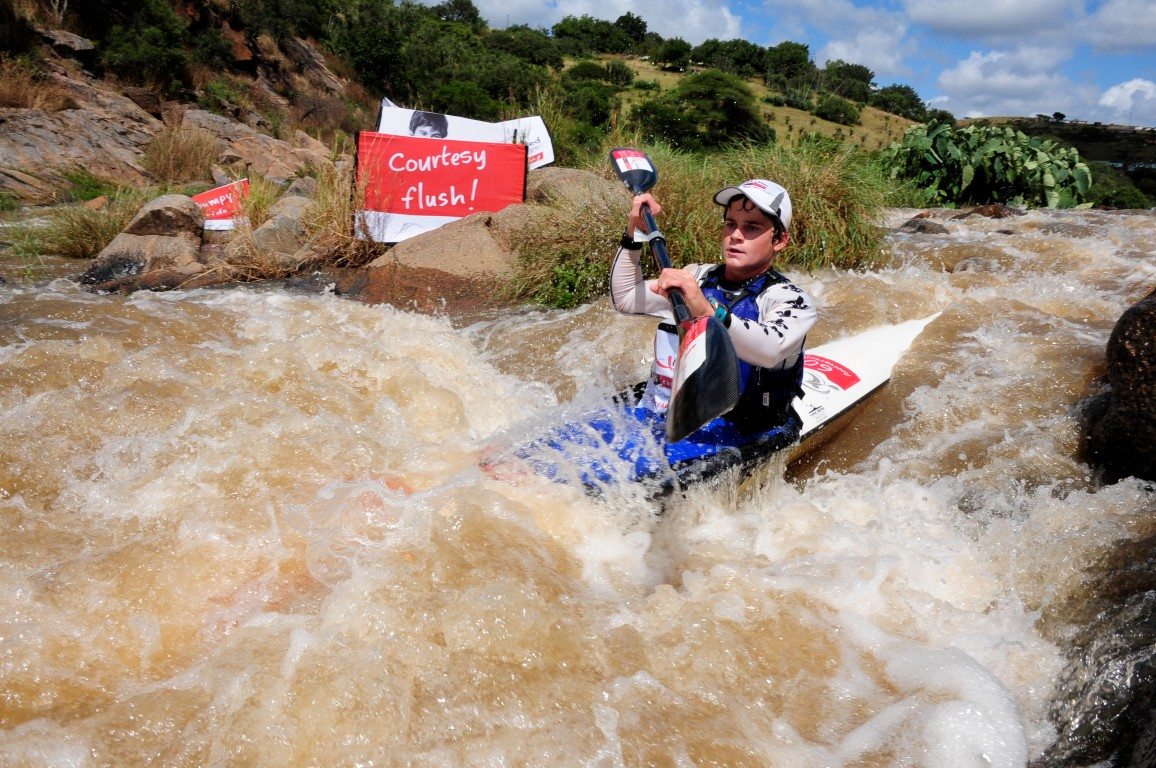
Hilton College paddler shooting Mission Rapid during the Dusi Canoe Marathon

Hilton College's sporting tradition stretches back to its establishment in 1872. There are three sports seasons at Hilton College and sport is compulsory at Hilton College and every form 1 is required to play a team sport in term 1. Hilton's most popular sports are Rugby, Cricket, Water Polo and Hockey. The school has seen success particularly in rugby, producing several Springbok Rugby players and also lending its colours to the Natal Rugby Union, which would later become the provincial colours of Natal and subsequently Kwa-Zulu Natal.

The school offers a wide variety of sports:

- Athletics
- Basketball
- Cross country
- Kayaking/Canoeing
- Cricket
- Golf
- Hockey
- Mountain biking
- Rowing
- Rugby/Rugby 7s
- Shooting
- Soccer
- Squash
- Swimming
- Table tennis
- Tennis
- Water polo

=== Cultural activities ===
- Art
- Choir
- Debating Society
- Drama Society
- Book Club
- Catholic Society
- Chess Club
- Christian Fellowship
- Computer Club
- Enterprise Club
- Film Society
- First Aid
- Fly Fishing Club
- Health and Fitness Club
- History Society
- Hollerith Society
- Jazz Band
- Marimba Band
- Senior Foreign Affairs Society
- Wildlife Society

=== Spiritual ===
Hilton is a non-denominational Christian college, and Christian worship, values and principles are the foundation of Hilton College life. Pupils attend chapel service twice a week, including Sundays. About 40% of the school pupils come from Anglican backgrounds; 15% from Roman Catholic; 13% from Methodist; the other denominations are less than 10% each.

=== School songs ===
Hilton College has two school songs. The formal 'School Hymn' is Lift Up Your Hearts!, an English hymn written in 1881 by A. Douglas. It is sung during chapel services such as Remembrance Day and Opening and Closing Services. The informal 'School Song' is Oh Boys of Hilton, which was written by Bobby Skinstad in 1993, and is sung to the tune of Flower of Scotland.

=== Exchange program ===
Hilton College has a student exchange programme with Eton College, Harrow School, Wrekin College and Framlingham College in England, Gordonstoun and Strathallan School in Scotland, Schule Schloss Salem in Germany, The Scots College, Knox Grammar School and Canberra Grammar School in Australia, and Charlotte Latin School and Woodberry Forest School in United States.

== Estate ==
A giraffe on the Hilton College Estate

Hilton College is situated on a 1,762 ha (4,350 acres) estate that includes a 550 ha (1,400 acres) wildlife reserve that borders the Umgeni River. The school campus, which has been described as one of the most beautiful in the world, is home to all school buildings including the Crookes Block (main academic building), the Centenary Centre (which incorporates the theatre), the William Campbell Building, Memorial Hall and the Chapel. Immediately beyond the campus is the school farm which includes wattle plantations and natural grazing areas and is used by boys for running and cycling.

The lower portion of the estate is the Hilton College Nature Reserve. Hilton boys have access to the reserve and make use of the grounds on Sundays for swimming, tubing, mountain biking, fishing, bird watching and exploring. In addition, academic departments make use of the reserve as part of the curriculum (e.g. Art, Biology, Geography)

== Notable Old Hiltonians ==
Hilton College has produced a number of notable old boys. There have been eight Springbok Rugby players including two captains (Gary Teichmann and Bobby Skinstad) and two constitutional court judges (John Didcott and Arthur Chaskalson).

Hilton also educated sports journalist Robert Marawa and Italian Rugby player Sebastian Negri. Lungi Ngidi is a South African cricketer.

Paul Maritz was previously Vice President of Microsoft and CEO of VMware

Fundi Sithebe former CEO of Airports Company South Africa (ACSA) and 4Racing.

Conor Mccreedy Swiss based artist and engineer. In 2022 a rare 4 kg book was made about his work by the publishing giant Assouline. Mccreedy has been described as the Blue Sultan of the Art World.

Robert-Falcon Ouellette is a politician from Canada and attended in 1995 for the historic elections. He was a member of Falcon House.

Neil Smith, class of 1997, Pearce House is an Emmy award winner for his contribution to Broadcast Technology at Super Bowl LVIII (Las Vegas 2024). He has been nominated for four other Emmy awards including the George Wensel Technical Achievement award for the 2023 Masters golf at Augusta.

== Hiltonian Society ==
The Hiltonian Society is a non-profit organisation that owns and runs Hilton College. It was formed in 1930 by the share holders of Hilton College Ltd., which owned the school at the time. Any Hilton Old boy or past teacher is eligible to become a member of the Hiltonian Society.

== Feeder schools ==
The following schools are all considered Hilton feeder schools and pupils are eligible to receive closed scholarships to Hilton College.

- Highbury Preparatory School, KwaZulu-Natal
- Clifton Preparatory School, Nottingham Road, KwaZulu-Natal
- Cowan House, KwaZulu-Natal
- Cordwalles Preparatory School, KwaZulu-Natal
- Clifton School, KwaZulu-Natal
- The Ridge School, Gauteng
- Pridwin Preparatory School, Gauteng
- St. Peter's Preparatory School, Gauteng
- Waterkloof House Preparatory School, Gauteng

== Memberships ==
- Independent Schools Association of Southern Africa
- Headmasters' and Headmistresses' Conference
- International Boys' Schools Coalition (IBSC)
- Cambridge International Schools

== See also ==
- List of boarding schools
