= Margaret Todd (doctor) =

Scottish medical doctor, schoolteacher, and writer

Margaret Georgina Todd
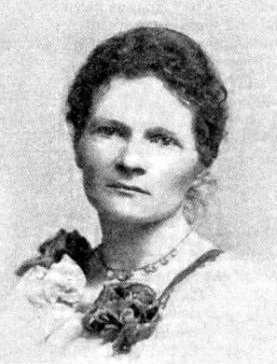
- Dr Margaret Todd
- Born: 23 April 1859; Kilrenny, Scotland
- Died: 3 September 1918 (aged 59)
- Education: Edinburgh School of Medicine for Women
- Known for: proposing the term isotope

Margaret Georgina Todd (23 April 1859 – 3 September 1918) was a Scottish medical doctor and writer. She coined the term isotope in 1913 in a suggestion to chemist Frederick Soddy.

== Early life and education ==
Todd was born in Kilrenny, Fife, Scotland, the daughter of James Cameron Todd and Jeannie McBain of Glasgow. She was educated in Edinburgh, Glasgow and Berlin.

Her brother was James Cameron Todd a British Anglican canon and schoolmaster, who founded Michaelhouse school in South Africa.

A Glaswegian schoolteacher, in 1886, Todd became one of the first students at the Edinburgh School of Medicine for Women after hearing that the Scottish Royal College of Physicians and Surgeons had opened their exams to women. She took eight years to complete the four-year course because, using the pseudonym Graham Travers, during her studies she wrote a novel, Mona Maclean, Medical Student.

This was described by Punch magazine as "a novel with a purpose – no recommendation for a novel, more especially when the purpose selected is that of demonstrating the indispensability of women-doctors". After graduating in 1894, she took her MD in Brussels.

== Career ==
She was appointed Assistant Medical Officer at Edinburgh Hospital and Dispensary for Women and Children, but retired after five years.

Her first book was well received. She later published Fellow Travellers and Kirsty O' The Mill Toun in 1896, followed by Windyhaugh in 1898, always using her male pen name, although her real identity was known by then and mentioned in reviews of her books. By 1906, even her publishers added "Margaret Todd, M.D." in parentheses after her pseudonym. In addition to six novels, she wrote short stories for magazines.

=== Isotopes ===
Todd was a family friend of chemist Frederick Soddy, then a lecturer at the University of Glasgow. In 1913, Soddy explained to her the research on radioactivity for which he won the Nobel Prize in Chemistry in 1921. He had shown that some radioactive elements have more than one atomic mass, although the chemical properties are identical, so that atoms of different masses occupy the same place in the periodic table. Todd suggested that such atoms be named isotopes, Greek for at the same place. This term was accepted and used by Soddy, and has become standard scientific nomenclature.

== Personal life ==
Todd is assumed to have been in a romantic relationship with Dr Sophia Jex-Blake, founder of Todd's university and place of employment. On Jex-Blake's retirement in 1899, they moved to Windydene, Mark Cross, where Todd wrote The Way of Escape (1902) and Growth (1906). After Jex-Blake's death, she wrote The Life of Dr Sophia Jex-Blake (1918) under her own name, describing the fight of women in the 19th century to enter the medical profession. The Times described it as "almost too laboriously minute for the general reader" but it received praise in other publications.

== Death and legacy ==
Todd died aged 59, three months after her book on Jex-Blake was published.

According to one source, she died by suicide; her Times obituary states only that she died in a nursing home in London. After her death, a scholarship was created in her name at the LSMW. She left £3,000 in her will (equivalent to £309,000 in 2025) to be used to promote the advancement of women in medicine.

== Selected works ==
- Graham Travers. Mona Maclean, Medical Student (Edinburgh and London: William Blackwood and Sons, 1892).
- Fellow Travellers (1896)
- Kirsty O' The Mill Toun (1896)
- Margaret Georgina Todd, Graham Travers (1899). Windyhaugh. D. Appleton and Company. (1899)
- The Way of Escape (1902)
- Growth (1906)
- The Life of Sophia Jex-Blake (1918)
