= Frankie's =

South African soft drink company

Frankie's Olde Soft Drink Company
- Industry: Beverage
- Founded: 2006
- Founder: Mike Schmidt
- Headquarters: Balgowan, KwaZulu-Natal (Umgungundlovu District Municipality), South Africa
- Area served: South Africa
- Products: Soft drinks
- Revenue: ▲ R18 million (2010/2011)
- Parent: Clover (dairy)
- Website: www.frankiessoftdrinks.com

Frankie's is a South African soft drink company based in Balgowan, KwaZulu-Natal. It specialises in the production of niche soft drinks that have the same or similar taste to soft drinks from or before the 1950s.

The company was established in 2006 by Mike and Paula Schmidt in Balgowan. Its largest markets in 2015 were the Western Cape, KwaZulu-Natal, and Gauteng provinces of South Africa. In 2015 the South African dairy company Clover bought a 51 percent ownership stake in the company, renaming the business operation Clover Frankie's.

== Woolworths controversy ==
In early 2012 the South African Advertising Standards Authority ruled that Woolworths’ vintage cold drink range was an imitation of Frankie’s soft drink range. It was ruled that Woolworths intentionally copied the phrase "Good Old Fashioned Soft Drinks" to promote its own line of beverages thereby infringing on the rights of Frankie's Soft Drinks. Woolworths agreed to remove the range immediately. The controversy got widespread coverage in the South African media. After the event Woolworths South Africa's CEO Ian Moir publicly stated that "Public opinion is so much against us and, whether we're right or whether we're wrong, customer opinion is against us."
