= Chick Henderson =

Chick Henderson may refer to:

- Chick Henderson (rugby union) (1930–2006), South African rugby union footballer and commentator
- Chick Henderson (singer) (1912–1944), English singer
