= Cordwalles Preparatory School =

Coordinates: 29°35′40″S 30°21′43″E

- Pietermaritzburg, KwaZulu-Natal; South Africa

Information
- Type: Private, Boarding
- Motto: Courage Builds Character
- Established: 1912
- Founder: Samuel Baines
- Locale: Suburban
- Headmaster: Lance Veenstra
- Grades: Pre-primary – 7
- Enrollment: 350 boys
- Colours: Brown & white
- Website: www.cordwalles.co.za

Cordwalles is a private, boarding preparatory school for boys founded in 1912. It is located in Pietermaritzburg, the capital city of KwaZulu-Natal, South Africa.

== Origins ==
Cordwalles was founded in 1912 by the Rt Revd Samuel Baines, Bishop of Natal as a preparatory school for Michaelhouse. It has grown considerably since its early beginnings as a boarding-only school and has had only seven headmasters. Cordwalles has an Anglican foundation.

=== Headmasters ===
- J. H. E. Besant, MA (Oxon) (1912 – 1946)
- J. D. Parmiter, MA (Cantab) (1947 – 1956)
- R. C. Brooks, MA (Cantab) (1957 – 1984)
- D. B. E. Bawden (1985 – 1995)
- T. G. Evans (1996 – 2003)
- S. J. Weaver (2004 – 2015)
- L. F. Veenstra (2016 – present)

== The school today ==
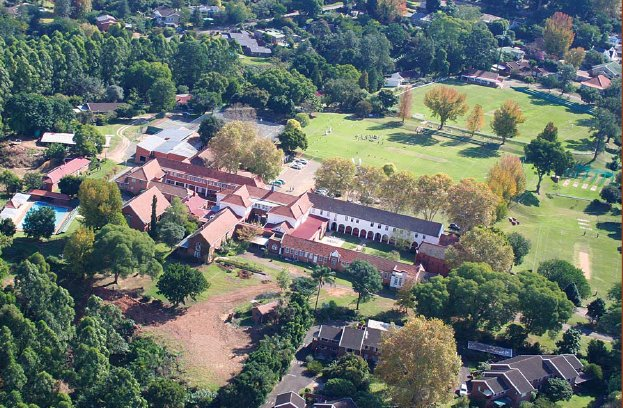
Cordwalles

Cordwalles is a boys preparatory school, which educates boys from Grade RR (boys turning 5) to Grade 7 (boys turning 13).

Cordwalles consists of fifteen hectares of ground, an 'Inky' (pre-school to grade 2) block and Lecture Room, Theatre, Science Laboratory, Design & Technology Centre and Computer and Media Centres.

There are over 300 boys taught by an academic and support staff of over 50. Most leavers go on to attend local private senior schools such as Hilton College, Kearsney College, Maritzburg College, St. Charles College and especially Michaelhouse.

== History ==
Cordwalles Preparatory School was founded by Bishop Samuel Baines in 1912 when Michaelhouse moved from Pietermaritzburg to Balgowan and needing a preparatory school of its own to ensure its future enrolment.

Cordwalles consisted of 5 acres (2.0 ha) of land, a house and twelve boys. By 1917 the school encompassed 19 acres (7.7 ha) of land, classrooms and dormitories. In the 1930s the chapel, gymnasium, swimming pool as well as additional classrooms, dormitories and land were added. During the Second World War numbers rose to one hundred and forty seven boys. From the 1950s further dormitories together with a Kitchen block, Sanatorium, and enlarged Dining Hall, Science Laboratory, Library and Staff Houses were constructed. The 1960s saw the development of the double storey block, the five sports fields and the four tennis courts.

== Notable alumni ==
- Professor David H.M.Brooks (1961), philosopher and author of The Unity of the Mind
- Gary Ralfe, former CEO of De Beers
- Robert Holmes à Court, Australia's first billionaire
- Barry Streek, journalist
- Wilbur Smith (1946), novelist
- Derek Varnals, cricketer
- Timothy Woods, schoolmaster
