= Giles Henderson =

Master of Pembroke College, Oxford

Giles Henderson CBE
- Born: Giles Ian Henderson; 20 April 1942 (age 84)
- Education: Michaelhouse School, South Africa
- Alma mater: University of the Witwatersrand; Magdalen College, Oxford
- Occupation: Retired
- Spouse: Lynne Fyfield (1971–present)
- Children: Mark; Simon; Clare
- Relatives: Eight grandchildren

Giles Ian Henderson, CBE (born 20 April 1942) is a solicitor who was Master of Pembroke College, Oxford.

== Early life and education ==
Giles Henderson was educated at Michaelhouse, a boarding independent school in Balgowan in Natal in South Africa, followed by the University of the Witwatersrand, from which he graduated with a Bachelor of Arts degree, and then Magdalen College at the University of Oxford, where he was a Senior Mackinnon Scholar and graduated as Master of Arts and Bachelor of Civil Law. He received a Fulbright Award and spent a year teaching at the Faculty of Law at University of California, Berkeley in 1966-67.

== Career ==
Henderson joined the leading London law firm of Slaughter and May in 1968 and was admitted as a solicitor in 1970. He became a partner in 1975 and was elected as the Senior Partner for two successive terms of office: 1993-2001. He was one of HM Government's main advisers on the process of privatisation (1983-1991). He was also a member of the Hampel Committee on Corporate Governance. He was appointed a Commander of the Most Excellent Order of the British Empire (CBE) by HM The Queen in 1992.

In 2001 he became Master of Pembroke College, Oxford, holding the office until 2013. Between 2007 and 2009 he also held the elected office of Chair of the Conference of Colleges in Oxford and was for six years a member of the Council of the University. He was also Chairman of the Nuffield Medical Trust.

Among his other previous appointments, Henderson was Chairman of the UK-China Forum law group, a non-executive director of Land Securities plc and Standard Life Assurance and a member of the Financial Reporting Council.

In 2019 he was elected as the Chairman of the Council at Marlborough College and retired in August 2023.

Academic offices
Preceded by Robert Stevens	Master of Pembroke College, Oxford; 2001-2013	Succeeded by Lynne Brindley
