= James Cameron Todd =

James Cameron Todd (October 13, 1863 - 1915) was a British Anglican canon and schoolmaster, who founded Michaelhouse school in South Africa.

James Cameron Todd in rugby outfit, 1897

== Early life ==
He was born in Rangoon in British Burma to a father of the same name. His schooling took place at the Royal High School (Edinburgh) from 1874 to 1881. He attended the University of Glasgow from 1881 to 1884 where he graduated with a B.Sc. degree, having been a pupil of Lord Kelvin.

His sister was Margaret Georgina Todd, a doctor and writer who was one of the first students to attend the Edinburgh School of Medicine for Women.

== Clergyman ==
He moved to South Africa, and in 1887 he was made deacon by the Rt Revd George Knight-Bruce, Bishop of Bloemfontein. He was curate of Vryburg, Bechuanaland in 1887 and curate of Kimberley, Griqualand from 1887 to 1888.

In 1888, he was admitted to Christ's College, Cambridge, having obtained a scholarship. He pursued an M.Sc. degree which he gained with first class honours, resulting in his election as Scholar of the College the following year.

In 1890, he was ordained priest in St. Paul’s Cathedral and took up the post of curate at St John’s Hammersmith in 1891.

He moved to Natal 1894 as chaplain to the Rt Revd Arthur Hamilton Baynes, Bishop of Natal and became Diocesan Theological Tutor (1894-1899), and was appointed Canon of Natal (1894-1904).

== School master ==
In 1896 he founded Michaelhouse in Loop Street, Pietermaritzburg. When he opened the doors on the first day in August 1896, it was as a private venture with 15 founding boys. Ten of these were boarders, and five were day boys. It is said that without Todd, Michaelhouse would never have been born.

While the school was in Pietermaritzburg, Todd worked to establish the school as the Diocesan College of Natal with its own Board of Governors. He also looked for a suitable country site to relocate the school away from the distractions of town. In 1901, the school moved to its current premises in Balgowan.

In 1903, Todd resigned as rector. He had ordered a piano without the approval of the board and as this was a substantial expenditure which required the board's approval a dispute ensued which culminated in Todd's decision to leave Michaelhouse.

== Life in England ==
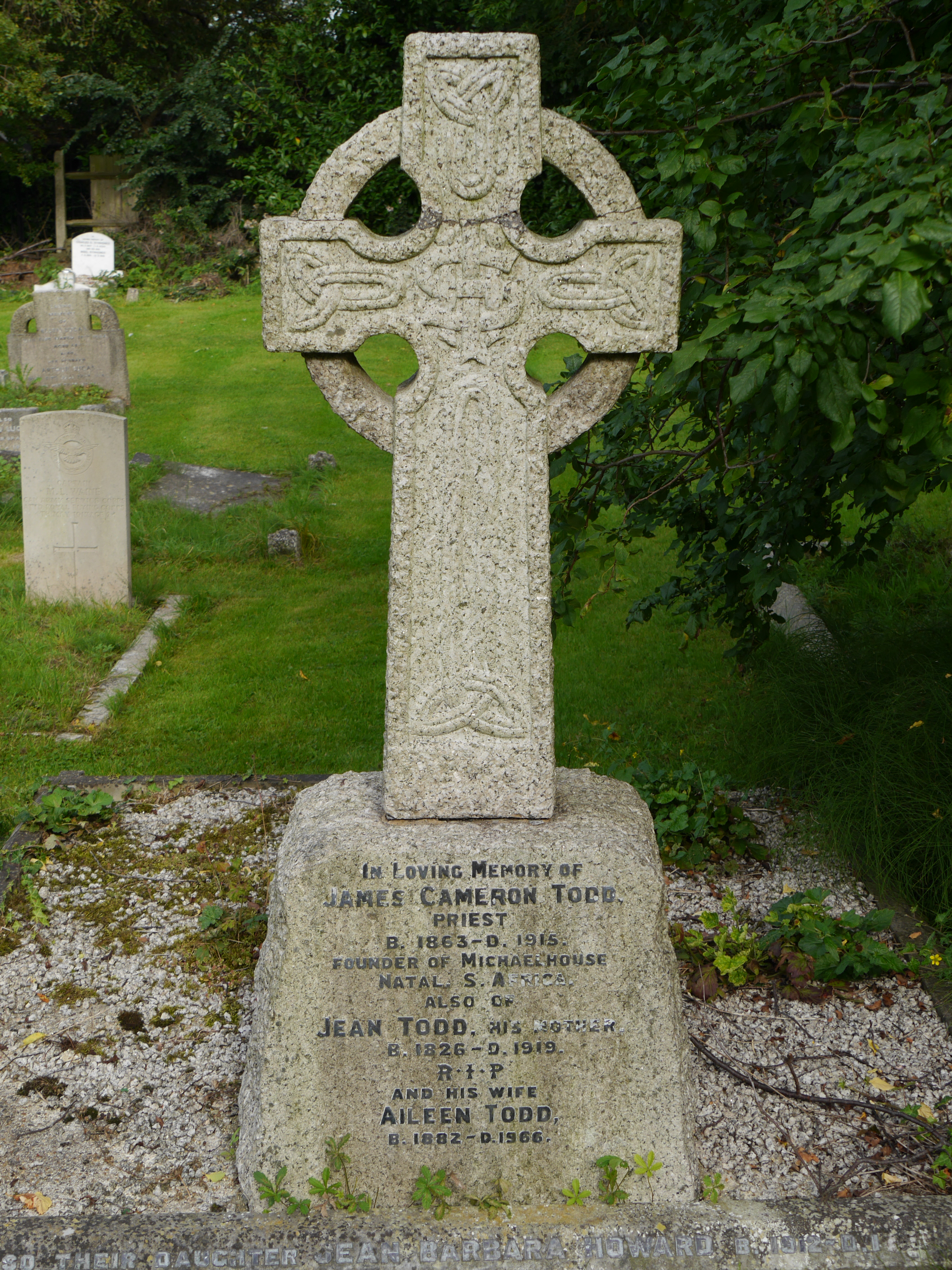
Todd's grave, St Martin's Church, Ruislip

Todd returned to England 1904. In London, he became engaged in literary and educational work. He wrote a number of books including Politics Religion in Ancient Israel; an Introduction to the Study of the Old Testament. BiblioBazaar. 1904. ISBN 9781176425491. and Undenominational Religion; what Does it Really Mean?. 1906.. Although he held no ecclesiastical position, he was in great demand as a preacher among the famous London Churches, preaching at both St James's Church, Piccadilly and the Temple Church.

He was sympathetic to the cause of the Suffragettes, despite opposition from the Church. At St. George's Church, Bloomsbury, he gave a memorable sermon at the funeral of Emily Davison. He was owner and headmaster of Netherfields School at Crouch End London, where he met his future wife, a staff member. In 1911, he sold the school and went to Canada where he married Aileen Mary Gallaher in Montreal.

On their return to England, the couple started a preparatory school (Kelvin House, named after Lord Kelvin) in Ruislip, London. In 1912, his first daughter Jean was born, followed in 1914 by Margaret. Todd died in 1915, at the age of 51, and is buried at St Martin's Church, Ruislip.
