= Witchery (company) =

Australian clothing store chain

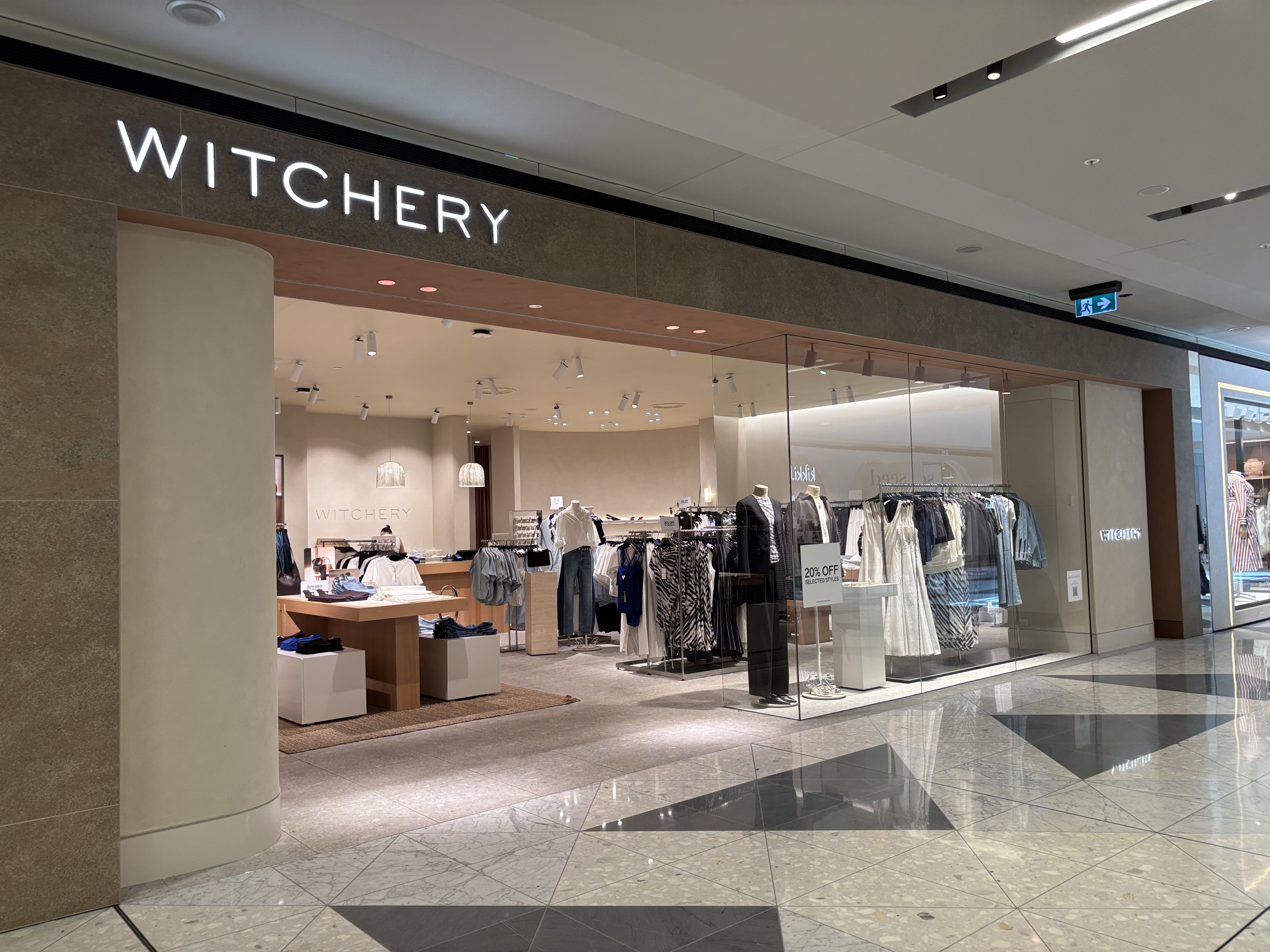
A Witchery store in the Canberra Centre

Witchery is an Australian fashion label specialising in women's clothing, shoes and accessories. Part of the Country Road Group, Witchery operates stores across mainland Australia, New Zealand and concession stores in Myer, David Jones and Woolworths South Africa. Based in Burnley, Victoria, Australia, the company has its flagship store located at Chadstone Shopping Centre.

== Acquisition ==
In 2012, Country Road purchased Witchery Group for $172 million. The takeover created one of Australia's biggest speciality apparel retailers, with 517 stores and $679 million in annual sales.
