= Country Road Group =

Australian fashion retail group

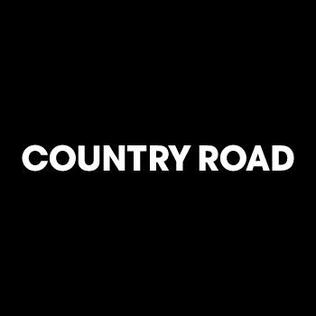
- Type: Subsidiary
- Traded as: ASX: CTY
- Industry: Retail
- Founded: 1974
- Founder: Stephen Bennett
- Headquarters: 572 Swan Street, Burnley, Victoria
- Number of locations: 630 (2025)
- Key people: Steven Cook (CEO)
- Products: Clothing; Footwear; Fashion accessories Homeware; Furniture
- Revenue: ▼ R12.57 billion (2025)
- Operating income: ▼ -R1.89 billion (2025)
- Net income: ▼ -R1.43 billion (2025)
- Number of employees: 3,470 (2025)
- Parent: Woolworths Holdings
- Website: countryroadgroup.com.au

The Country Road Group is an upper middle market clothing retailer with operations in Australia, New Zealand and South Africa. It is a subsidiary of major South African retail company Woolworths, which is headquartered in Cape Town.

The company's brands include the self-named Country Road, Mimco, Trenery, Politix, and Witchery. As of 2025, Country Road has 630 locations, 88 of which are in South Africa, with the rest situation across Australasia.

== History ==
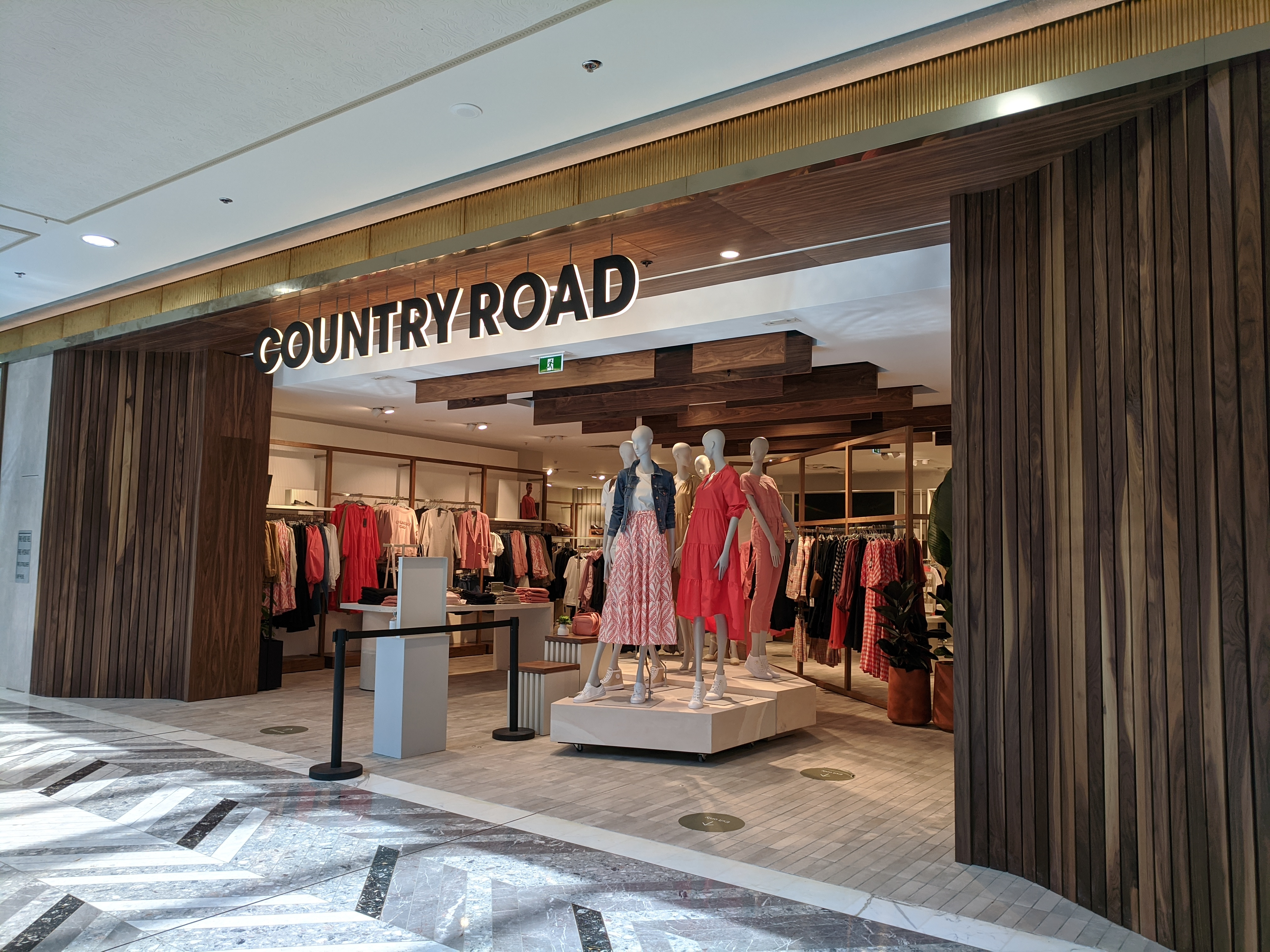
A Country Road store in Canberra

Country Road was founded in 1974 by Stephen Bennett, initially as a niche women's shirting label. It grew rapidly to become Australia's first lifestyle brand. In 1981, Myer purchased Country Road, before listing it on the Australian Securities Exchange (ASX) in 1987.

In 1988, it expanded into homewares and the American market. By 1980 it was selling women's apparel and had products in department stores as well as in ten Country Road stores. In 1984, Country Road began producing menswear, then in 1986, it began producing accessories. Its growth during the 1990s extended in both product range and location, operating over 100 stores at its peak.

In 1998, South African company Woolworths acquired a controlling interest in the company. However, Woolworths was unable to take the Country Road private due to Solomon Lew refusing to sell the 11.67% stake held by his family company Australian Retail Investments.

Country Road was relaunched in July 2004 as a company that has higher volume sales and lower product prices, with its head office in Burnley, Victoria, and the Australian flagship store at Chadstone Shopping Centre.

In 2003, Country Road entered into an exclusive agreement with Myer department stores. Under this agreement, Country Road agreed to sell exclusively to Myer and not to its main rival, David Jones. It also included joint marketing and in-store visual merchandising. This arrangement ended in January 2007 when Country Road became a concession store in David Jones and Myer stores. There were also stores in Boston, Chicago, New York City and other cities in the United States, as recently as 2000 or later, which closed due to weak sales.

In June 2009, Country Road launched Trenery, a new brand aimed at the 40-plus market.

In 2012, Country Road purchased Witchery Group, which include Witchery and Mimco. Having built up an 88% shareholding in the company, Woolworths took full ownership of Country Road in July 2014 when it purchased Solomon Lew's shareholding for $200 million with the company delisted from the ASX.

The Country Road Group acquired menswear chain Politix in October 2016.

In June 2021, the Country Road Group began selling products from its brands on online marketplace The Iconic.

In February 2024, Country Road Group chief supply chain officer Rachid Maliki left the company after allegations of sexual harassment and bullying. Mehmed Mustafic, a general manager, left the company the following month after allegations of workplace bullying. Staff dissatisfaction over the company's handling of their complaints and allegations that CEO Raju Vuppalapati had protected Maliki led to the scandal being made public in the media in May 2024.

Vuppalapati resigned in June 2025 and was succeeded by Steven Cook, a former Debenhams CEO, in July 2025. Under Cook, Country Road and Witchery began selling products from external brands on their websites in November 2025. Trenery, Mimco and Politix are expected to follow suit in 2026.

In October 2026, the company announced it would significantly reduce its concessions in David Jones stores in 2027 as both companies battle increasing financial pressure and many underpaid suppliers leave David Jones.

== Brands ==
The Country Road Group operates the following brands:

- Country Road
- Mimco
- Trenery
- Politix
- Witchery
