= David H. M. Brooks =

- Born: 6 February 1950; Pietermaritzburg, South Africa
- Died: 27 October 1996 (aged 46); Cape Town, South Africa
- Education: Cordwalles; Michaelhouse; University of Natal, Pietermaritzburg (B.A.); Emmanuel College, Cambridge (M.A.); University of Cape Town (Ph.D.)
- Occupations: Philosopher, Western Philosophy, 20th-century philosophy
- Known for: Analytic Philosophy, Philosophy of the Mind
- Spouse: Rowena Sylvia
- Parents: Ronald Brooks (father); Nan Jones (mother)
- Relatives: Alice Ann (sister), Peter Havard Macleod (brother)

David Havard Macleod Brooks (6 February 1950 – 27 October 1996) was a South African philosopher and professor of philosophy at the University of Cape Town.

He went to Cordwalles Preparatory School in Pietermaritzburg (1957–1963) where his father, Ronald Charles Brooks, was headmaster. He then went to Michaelhouse (1964-1967) and on to university in Pietermaritzburg. His second degree was his MA at Emmanuel College, Cambridge and his doctorate was from the University of Cape Town.

Brooks was born in Pietermaritzburg, KwaZulu-Natal. He is the author of The Unity of Mind, published by Macmillan in 1994 and also the author of papers on philosophical aspects of biology and on the special wrongness which characterises racial discrimination, On living in an Unjust Society published in the Journal of Applied Philosophy, and subsequently anthologized in a collection entitled Social Ethics; and on human rights in South Africa. He died in Cape Town on 27 October 1996.

== Publications ==
- Posthumous publication on research into the Enneagram of Personality. (Brooks, David, "Are personality traits inherited?" South African Journal of Science, Jan 1998, Vol. 94, p9.)
- Brooks, D. H. M. (1981). Memories and the world. Analysis 41 (June):141-145.
- Brooks, D. H. M. (1985). Strawson, Hume, and the unity of consciousness. Mind 94 (October):583-86.
- Brooks, D. H. M. (1986). Group minds. Australasian Journal of Philosophy 64 (December):456-70.
- Brooks, D. H. M. (1992). Secondary qualities and representation. Analysis 52 (3):174-179.
- Brooks, D. H. M. (1994). How to perform a reduction. Philosophy and Phenomenological Research 54 (4):803-14.
- Reduction comes to supervenience plus explicability. Thus biconditionals, multiple realizability, etc., are irrelevant. Biology is already reduced (mostly via functional explanation), and psychology looks promising. Nice.
- Brooks, D. H. M. (1995). The Unity of the Mind. St Martin's Press.
- Brooks, David (1980). The impossibility of psycho-physical laws. Philosophical Papers 9 (October):21-45.
- Brooks, David (1995). Cartesian inner space. South African Journal of Philosophy 14 (4):135-144.
- Brooks, David (2000). How to solve the hard problem: A predictable inexplicability. Psyche 6 (4):5-20.
