= Roy Gathorne =

South African cricketer (1920–2016)

Personal information
- Born: 21 August 1920; Durban, South Africa
- Died: 17 March 2016 (aged 95); Pietermaritzburg, South Africa
- Source: Cricinfo, 17 December 2020

Roy Gathorne (21 August 1920 – 17 March 2016) was a South African cricketer. He played in six first-class matches for Eastern Province in 1952/53.

The cricket ground at Michaelhouse, his old school, is named after him.

== See also ==
- List of Eastern Province representative cricketers
