= Warrick Fynn =

South African cricketer

Personal information
- Full name: Warrick Francis Sinclair Fynn
- Born: 19 April 1985 (age 41); Durban, Natal, South Africa
- Batting: Left-handed
- Bowling: Slow left-arm orthodox

Domestic team information
- Years: Team
- 2004/05: KwaZulu-Natal
- 2006/07–2009/10: Eastern Province
- 2017–2019: Shropshire

Career statistics
Competition	First-class	List A
Matches	10	12
Runs scored	367	182
Batting average	24.46	22.75
100s/50s	1/1	–/1
Top score	104	89*
Balls bowled	1,325	570
Wickets	24	19
Bowling average	28.08	22.84
5 wickets in innings	2	–
10 wickets in match	–	–
Best bowling	6/59	4/30
Catches/stumpings	9/–	2/–
- Source: Cricinfo, 10 July 2019

Warrick Francis Sinclair Fynn (born 19 April 1985) is a South African former first-class cricketer.

Fynn was born at Durban in April 1985. He was educated at Maritzburg College and Michaelhouse, before going up to Nelson Mandela University. He made his debut in first-class cricket for KwaZulu-Natal against Free State in the 2004–05 UCB Provincial Cup, taking 3 wickets in the match. He later played first-class cricket for Eastern Province between 2006/07–2009/10, making nine appearances. Playing as an all-rounder, he scored 365 runs at an average of 26.07, with a high score of 104. This score, which was his only first-class century, came against Border in November 2007. With his slow left-arm orthodox bowling, he took 21 wickets for Eastern Province at a bowling average of 27.14, with best figures of 6 for 59. These figures, which were one of two first-class five wicket hauls he took, came in the same match that he made his century. Fynn also scored List A one-day cricket for Eastern Province between 2006/07–2009/10, making twelve appearances. He scored 182 runs in these matches, with a high score of 89 not out. With the ball, he took 19 wickets at an average of 22.84, with best figures of 4 for 30.

Fynn later played minor counties cricket in England for Shropshire between 2017–19, making six appearances in the Minor Counties Championship and a single appearance in the MCCA Knockout Trophy.
