= Woolworths (South Africa) =

South African retail company

Woolworths Holdings Limited

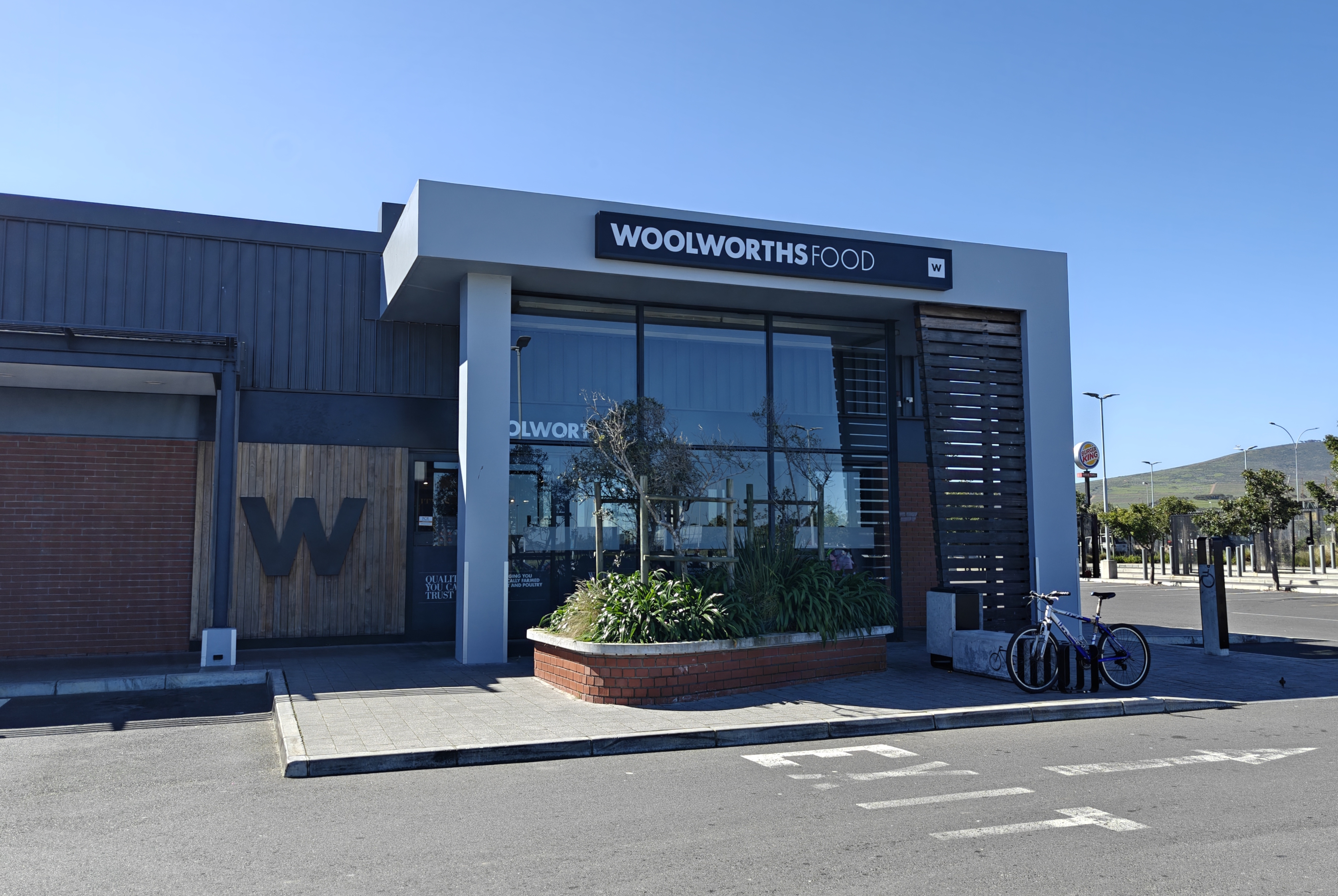
- The entrance to a Woolworths Food store in Richwood, Western Cape
- Type: Public
- Traded as: JSE: WHL
- ISIN: ZAE000063863
- Industry: Retail
- Founded: 1931; 95 years ago
- Founder: Max Sonnenberg
- Headquarters: Cape Town, South Africa
- Number of locations: ▲1,669 (2026)
- Area served: Africa (~68% of stores); Australasia (~32% of stores)
- Key people: Clive Thomson (Chairman); Sam Ngumeni (CEO)
- Products: Groceries; Clothing; Homeware; Financial services Cosmetics
- Revenue: ▲ R82.77 billion (2026)
- Operating income: ▲ R5.19 billion (2026)
- Net income: ▲ R2.58 billion (2026)
- Total assets: ▲ R43.29 billion (2026)
- Total equity: ▲ R11.14 billion (2026)
- Number of employees: 31,583 (2026)
- Divisions: Woolworths; WCafe; Woolworths Financial Services; Absolute Pets; Country Road Group
- Website: woolworthsholdings.co.za woolworths.co.za

Woolworths (officially Woolworths Holdings Limited, and colloquially known as Woolies) is a South African multinational retail company headquartered in Cape Town. Founded in 1931, the company owns the South African luxury department store and grocery chain Woolworths, the Australian retailer Country Road, and South Africa's largest pet store chain, Absolute Pets. As of 2026, the group employs around 32,000 people.

The South African division of Woolworths comprises grocery stores in various formats, as well as luxury goods retail, including fashion, homeware, and beauty products. Convenience stores situated at Engen gas stations are located in metropolitan areas across South Africa.

A major part of the group, Woolworths Financial Services (WFS), offers store cards, credit cards, revolving loans, and pet insurance to consumers. In its 2026 fiscal year, WFS accounted for 4% of Woolworths' revenue.

As of 2026, Woolworths has a total of 1,669 locations. Most of the company's stores (around 62%) are in South Africa, with the rest located in other African countries, as well as Australasia in the case of the Country Road Group.

The company also operates pet store chain Absolute Pets which, as of 2026, has a total of 196 stores in SA. As of its 2026 fiscal year, Woolworths has a retail trading area covering 839,600 sqm.

Woolworths also operates WCafe, a chain of approximately 230 cafés that vary in size – from full-service, sit-down restaurants, to coffee bars with their own counters integrated into Woolworths stores, to smaller barista stations outside certain food stores. The cafés also facilitate bakery orders. WCafe is a prominent brand within the South African coffeehouse market and is among those with the highest number of outlets.

== History ==
The first Woolworths store, in the stately dining room of The Royal Hotel, Cape Town

Founded by Max Sonnenberg and his son Richard Sonnenberg, Woolworths first opened its doors on 30 October 1931 on Plein Street, Cape Town, in the dining room of the recently closed Royal Hotel. The early success of the business led to the opening of two additional stores in the Cape region. A second branch was established in Durban three years later, with two additional branches opening in Johannesburg and Port Elizabeth the following year.

It soon became evident that the new business had the potential to expand nationwide, although a lack of capital initially hindered this prospect. Sonnenberg's friend, Elie Susman, provided the necessary funds for expansion into the Transvaal and subsequently became his business partner.

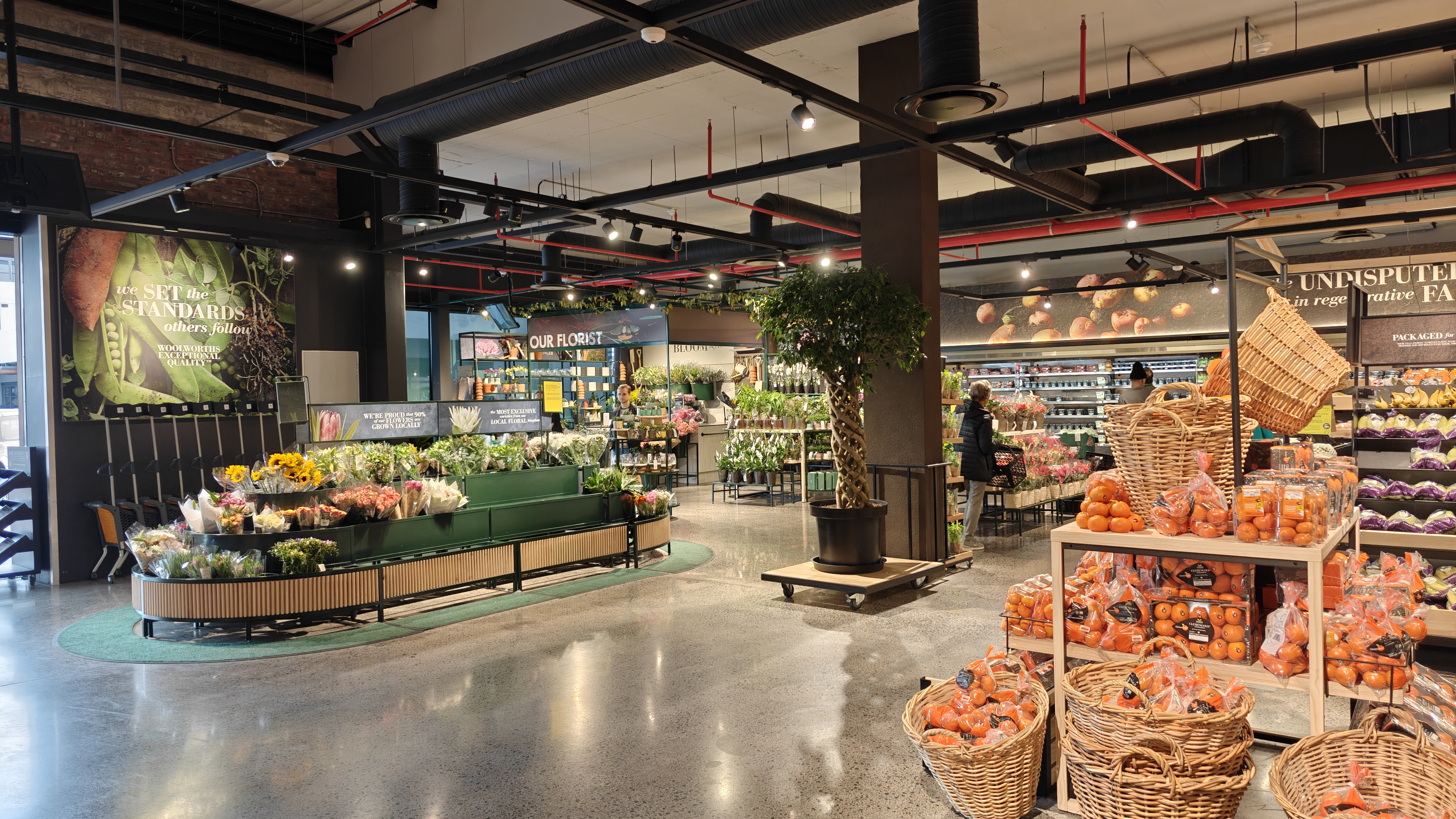
Florist and fresh produce sections of the Durbanville Woolworths Food Emporium

The choice of the name originated from Sonnenberg's friendship with a London shipper and financier, Percy (P.R.) Lewis. Lewis was a director of Australasian Chain Stores (ACS), a London shipping and finance house established to serve a rapidly expanding Australian business founded by W.T. Christmas.

London shippers frequently provided financing and selected goods sight unseen, which were then dispatched to their clients. Since the (now defunct) American company F.W. Woolworth Company had no interest in trading in Australia, "Father" Christmas – as he was known – adopted the name for his new enterprise. Lewis proposed to Sonnenberg that ACS could supplement "Father" Christmas's order sheet and send a scaled-down quantity of each successive item from Australia to South Africa.

Accordingly, Sonnenberg adopted the name for his venture. Two years later, a South African court ruled that sufficient goodwill had been established to dismiss an injunction brought by the American retailer against the use of the name.

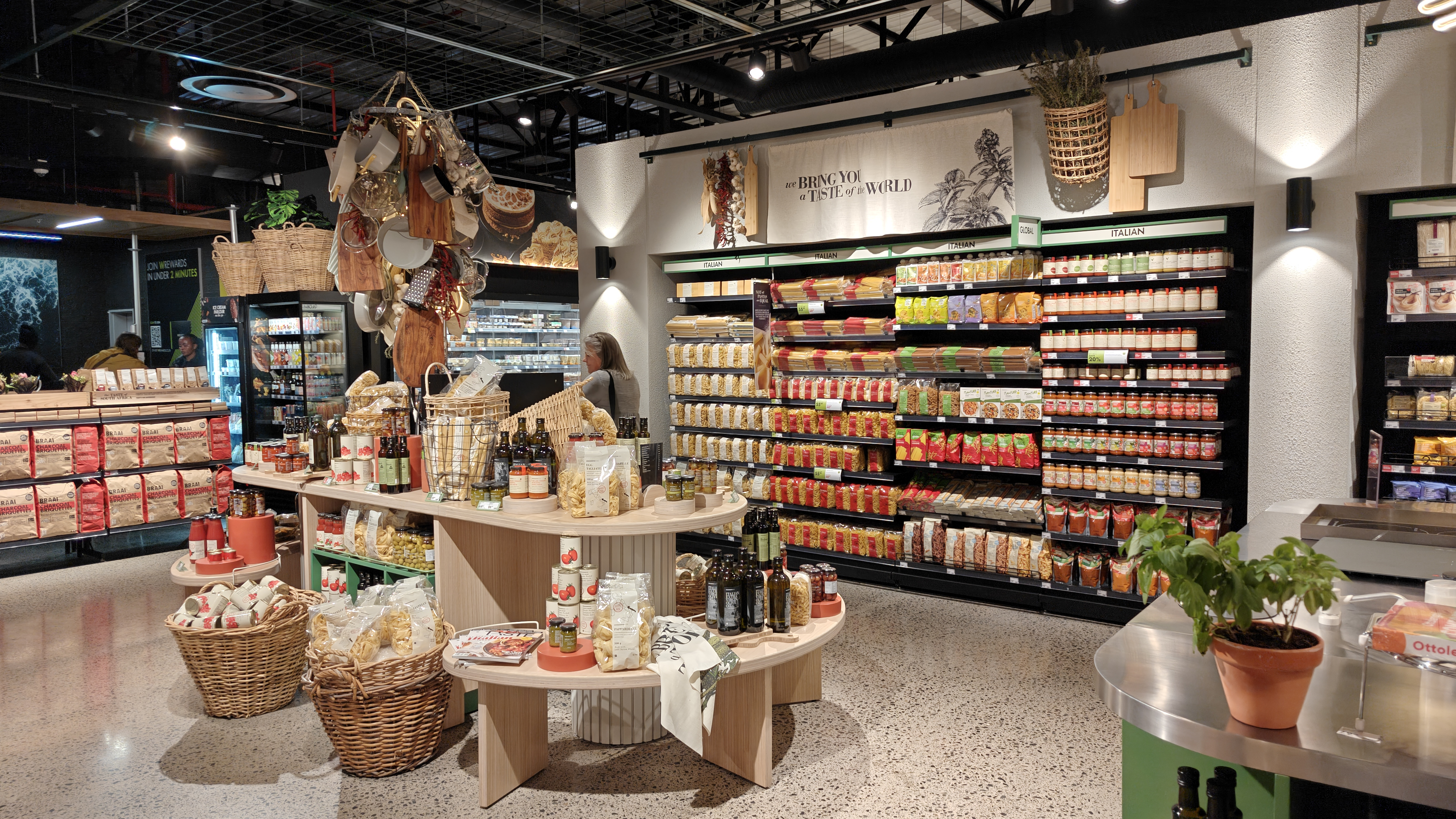
Italian and Mexican pantry section of the Durbanville Woolworths Food Emporium

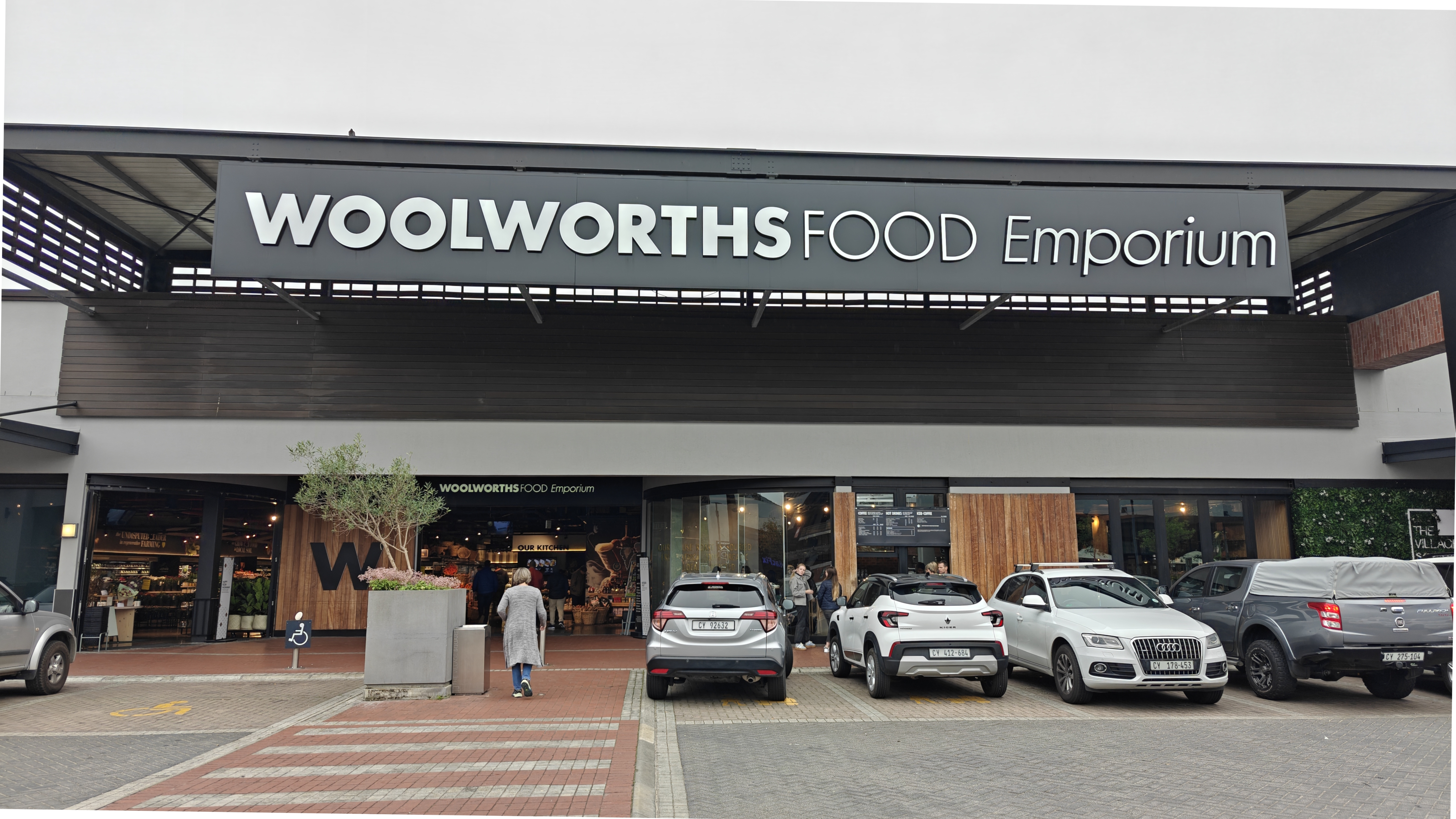
Woolworths Food Emporium in Durbanville, Western Cape

In 1998, Woolworths acquired a controlling interest in the Australian clothing retailer Country Road. However, the company was unable to take Country Road private due to Solomon Lew's refusal to sell his 11.67% stake in the business. Woolworths assumed full ownership of Country Road in July 2014 when it purchased Lew's shareholding for US$200 million.

In 2000, Woolworths partnered with South Africa's largest gas station chain, Engen Petroleum, to pilot a new Woolworths Foodstop convenience store format. In 2003, the partnership officially launched to the public.

In 2014, Woolworths purchased the Australian department store business David Jones for A$2.1 billion. David Jones was sold to the private equity firm Anchorage Capital Partners in December 2023.

In August 2023, Woolworths Financial Services (WFS) began offering pet insurance under the WPetInsure brand. The packages were underwritten by major commercial bank Absa, which also underwrites the group's credit cards and loans.

In March 2025, Woolworths launched its Woolies After Dark partnership with Uber Eats. Available at select Woolworths Foodstops in Engen gas stations, the service enabled at-home deliveries until midnight, beyond any of the retailer's standard store hours.

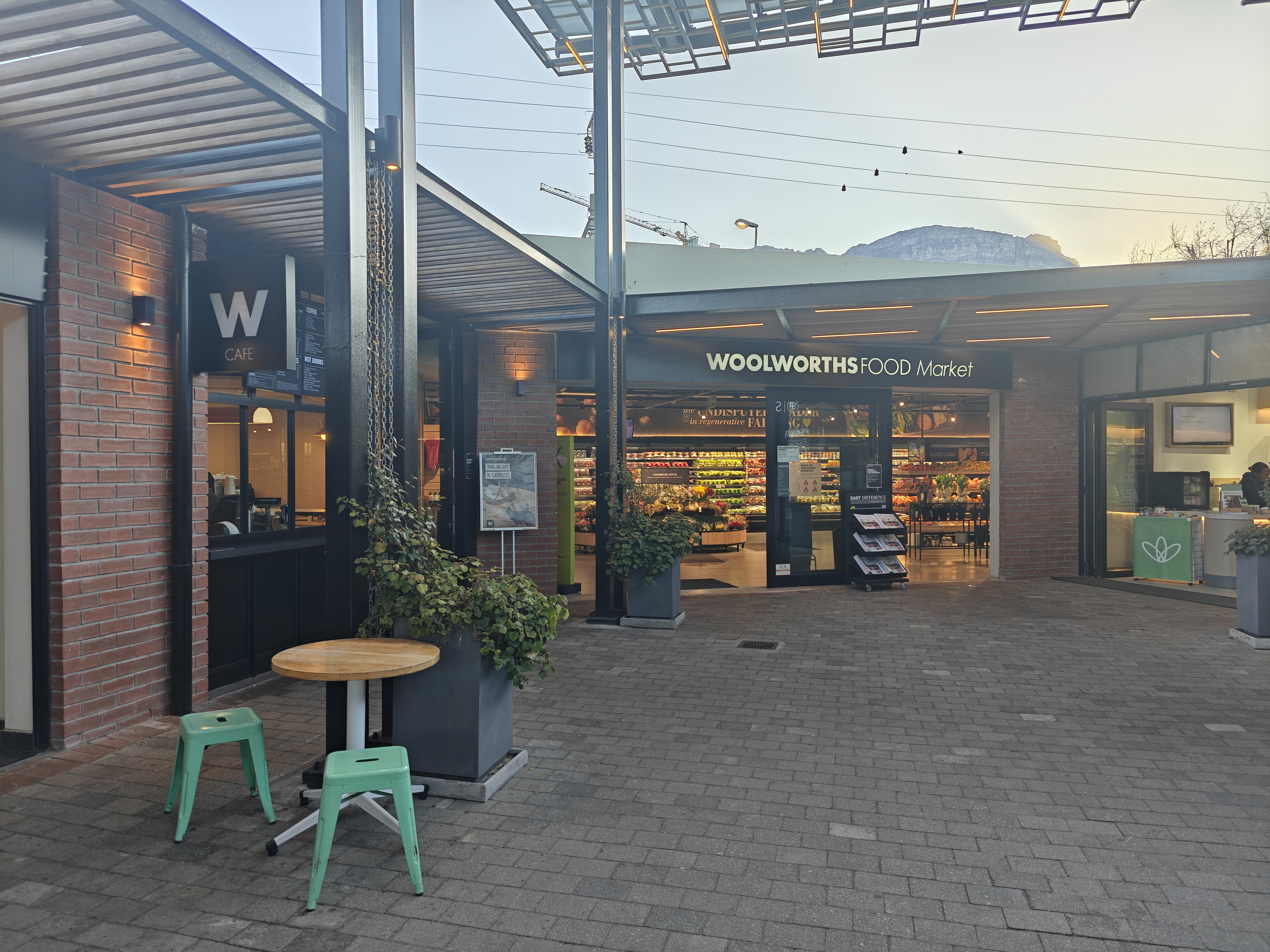
Entrance to a Woolworths Food Market and detached WCafe in Palmyra Junction shopping center, in Claremont, Cape Town

In July 2025, Woolies opened a new format of store – Woolworths Food Emporium – with the first location in Durbanville, Western Cape. The store became the company's new flagship. The supermarket is not only larger than the average Woolworths Food store but also features an experiential design. The new layout includes specialist areas including a florist station, Our Kitchen to-go counter with live cooking, fishmonger, confectionery section, Italian and Mexican pantry areas, and the WCellar wine section.

By late 2025, Woolworths had begun rolling out new store formats and format names. This included rebranding some of its existing food stores to Woolworths Food Local, while keeping its Food Market and Food Stop branding, as well as the far newer Food Emporium flagship store format. New standalone store types included WEdit for clothing and WCellar for liquor.

In February 2026, Woolworths announced that it was piloting self-checkout at its store in the Foreshore, Cape Town. The retailer aimed to determine whether a single Express Till could help reduce lunchtime queues. A Woolworths spokesperson stated that the trial would not eliminate cashier roles and that any affected staff would be retrained and redeployed to other store positions. The move followed an August 2025 pilot of smart shopping carts by competing retailer Checkers.

In March 2026, it was announced that Roy Bagattini would retire as Woolworths' CEO at the end of September 2026, after over six years in the position. He will be succeeded by the current Woolworths Food division CEO, Sam Ngumeni.

Also in March, it was reported that Woolworths had signed a deal to wholly acquire In2Food, a longtime supplier of its premium convenience food products, from the latter's founder, Old Mutual Private Equity. The value of the deal was not disclosed, but at the time, In2Food generated around R5 billion in annual revenue.

In June 2026, it was reported that Woolworths had partnered with Takealot Group for warehousing and distribution services, for Woolworths Online. The group was also using Takealot's delivery subsidiary Mr D, to deliver items from Woolworths-owned Absolute Pets.

In August 2026, Woolworths opened its second flagship Woolworths Food Emporium store. Located at Dainfern Square in Johannesburg, the store is the same large format as the first Emporium location that opened in Cape Town just over a year earlier.

In September 2026, it was reported that the 101st Woolworths Foodstop convenience store had opened, in partnership with Engen Petroleum.

That same month, Woolworths received approval, with conditions, from the South African Competition Commission for its acquisition of supplier In2Food.

In October 2026, Woolworths told the media it was accelerating the rollout of its "next generation stores" across South Africa. Serving as the blueprint for this rollout would be the Woolworths Tyger Valley store in Cape Town, which was the first full-line next gen store to open, back in 2025. The Tygervalley location was renovated with the goal of creating a more open and experience-focused environment in which Woolies' food, fashion, cosmetics, and home segments were merged, shifting away from a traditional department store layout. Next gen stores include changes to the way food and fashion departments are presented; on-site denim lasering, tailoring, bra fitting and beauty consultations; refreshed fashion areas for Country Road, Trenery, and Witchery; complimentary gift wrapping; upgraded food counters; and a reorganized Global Pantry area.

== Operations ==
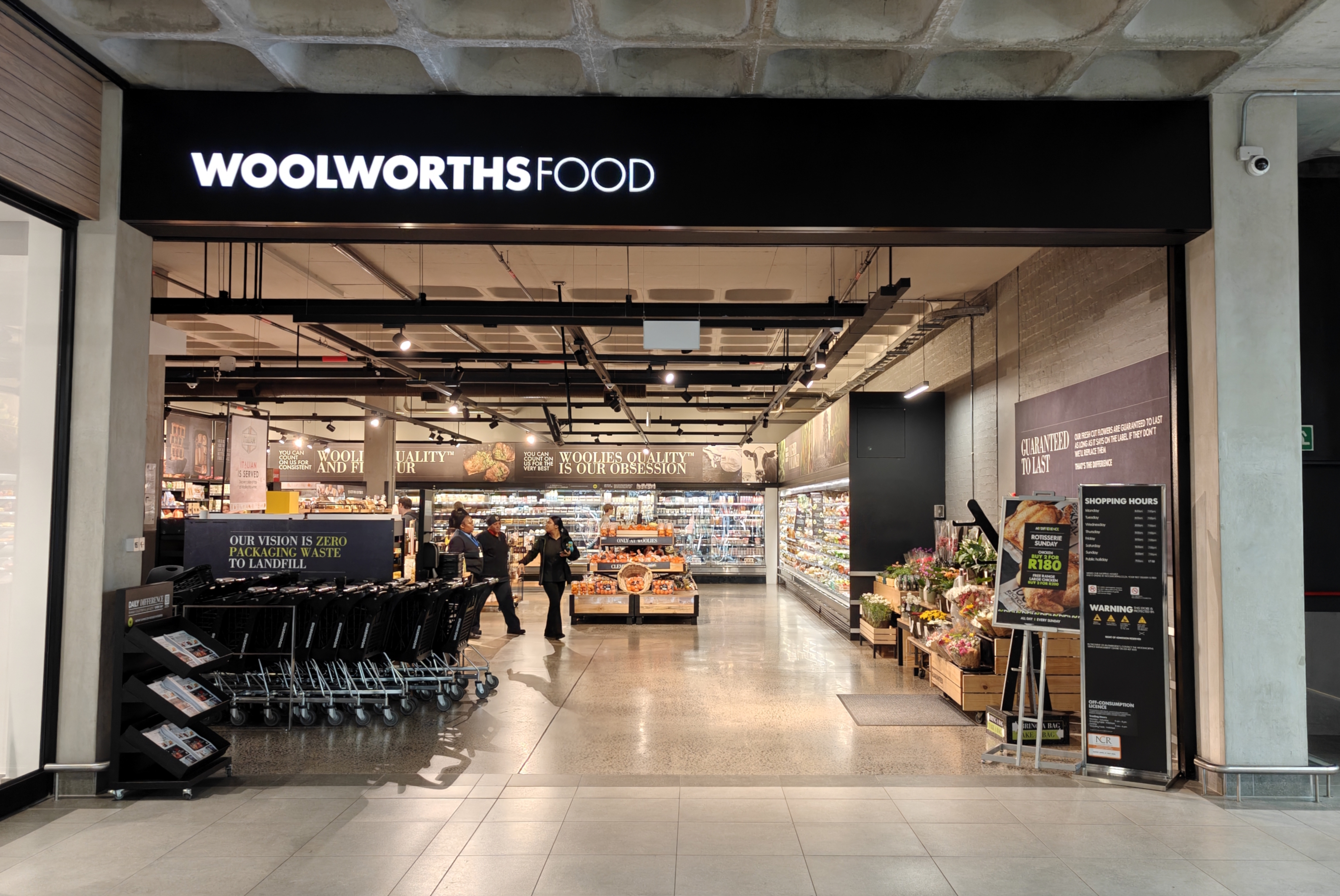
The entrance to a Woolworths Food store in 3Arts Village, Plumstead, Cape Town

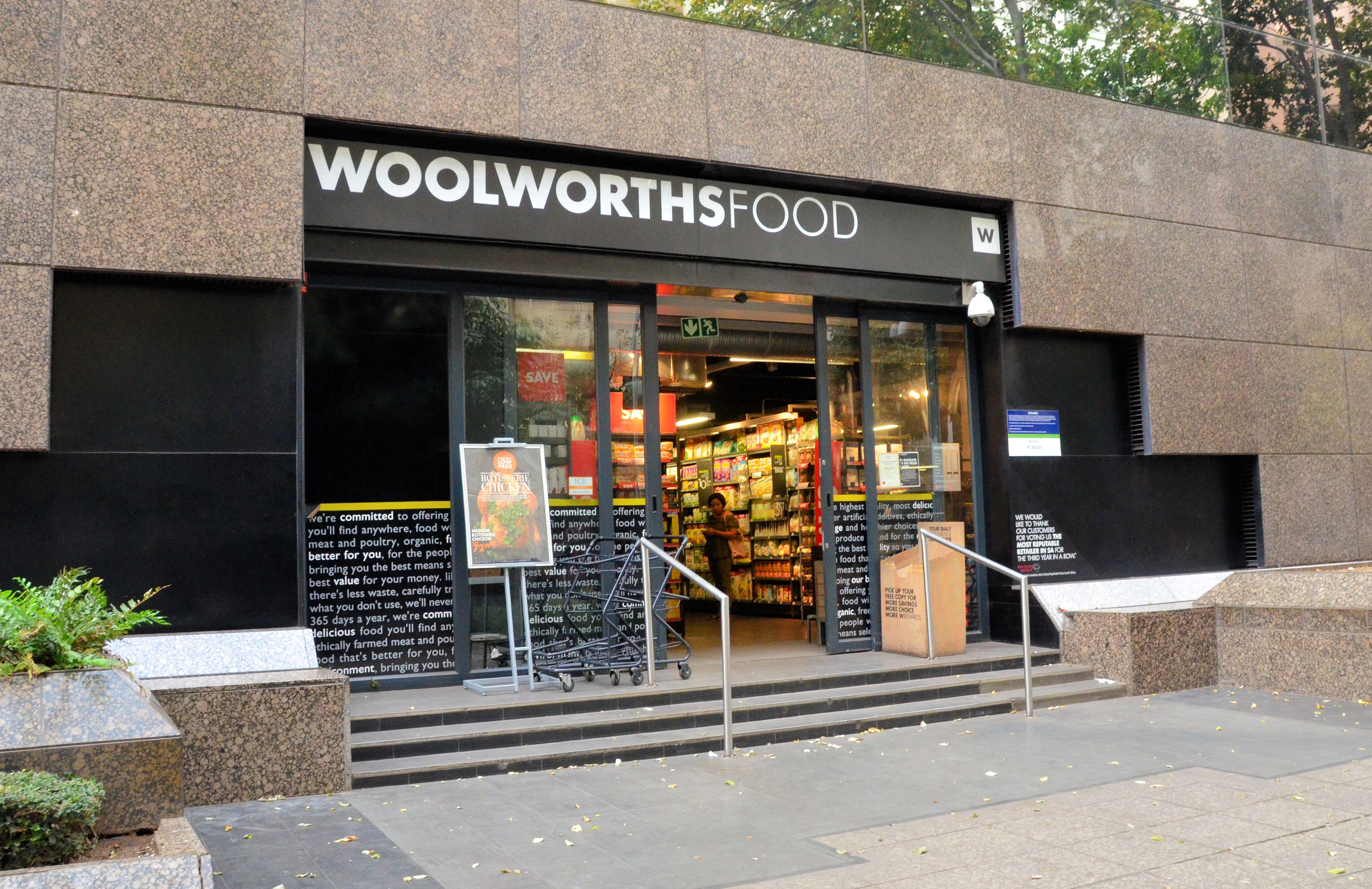
A Woolworths Food outlet in Johannesburg, Gauteng

Woolies operates numerous different formats of stores, including:

- Woolworths (department stores with food, clothing, and homeware)
- Woolworths Food Emporium (large grocery stores)
- Woolworths Food (medium grocery stores)
- Woolworths Food Market (small grocery stores)
- Woolworths Food Local (micro grocery stores)
- Woolworths FoodStop (convenience stores)
- WCafé (coffeehouses)
- WCellar (standalone liquor stores)
- WEdit (standalone clothing stores)
- Absolute Pets (pet stores)

Woolworths also operates Country Road Group - a separate clothing brand, with its own distinct areas in Woolworths department stores.

Furthermore, the company operates Woolworths Financial Services (WFS), a consumer finance division that offers store cards, credit cards, personal loans, and pet insurance to eligible clients.

As of 2026, of the company's 1,010 Woolworths-branded locations, 710 are dedicated food stores, with the other 300 including fashion, beauty, and/or homeware products.

As of 2026, Woolworths' geographical store distribution, across all store types, is as follows:

- South Africa – 1,007 (61.7%)
- Rest of Africa – 95 (5.8%)
- Australasia – 529 (32.4%)

== Brands ==
The company sells clothing and accessories under several brands, including Studio W, RE:, and Edition, while also representing the Group's Australian brands, including Country Road, Witchery, and Trenery.

Its financial service offerings are marketed under the WFS brand, with pet insurance marketed as WPetInsure. The group's loyalty program operates under the WRewards brand name.

== Corporate affairs and culture ==
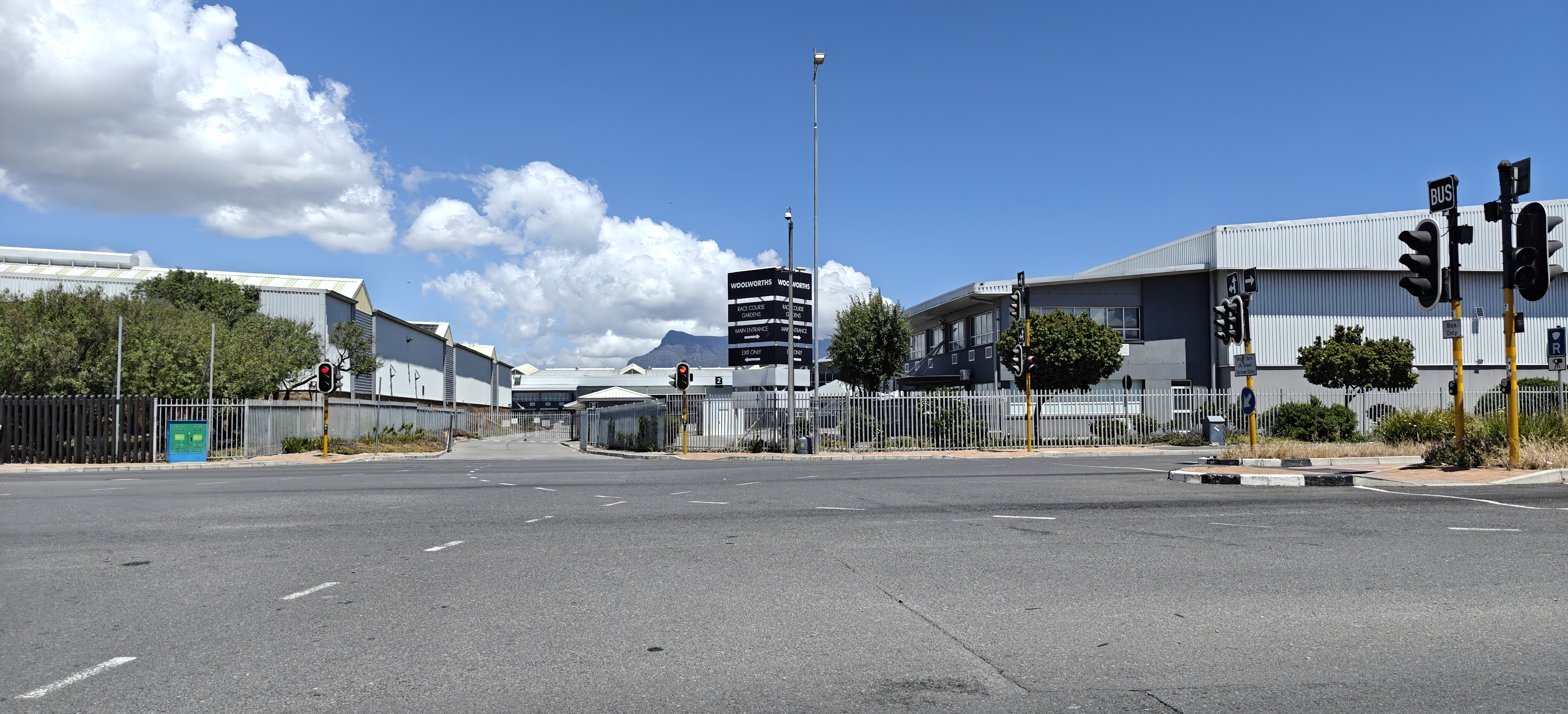
Woolworths distribution center in Milnerton, Cape Town

=== Good Business Journey ===
Launched in 2007, the Good Business Journey set specific public sustainability targets for the company. It also aims to ensure a consistent approach to addressing sustainability issues across its global supply chain, as part of Woolworths' stated ambition to be the most sustainable retailer in the Southern Hemisphere.

In 2016, the company introduced its GBJ 2020 goals, which included integrating the programme into the Group's Australian businesses – now accounting for over forty percent of turnover.

The WHL Group's GBJ 2020 commitments include contributing over R3.5 billion to communities across the Group over the subsequent five years; saving 500 billion litres of water during the same period; halving the company's energy impact by 2020 and achieving 100 percent clean energy by 2030; driving responsible sourcing of all key commodities by 2020; and ensuring that every private-label product sold incorporates at least one sustainability attribute by 2020.

=== Sustainable development goals ===
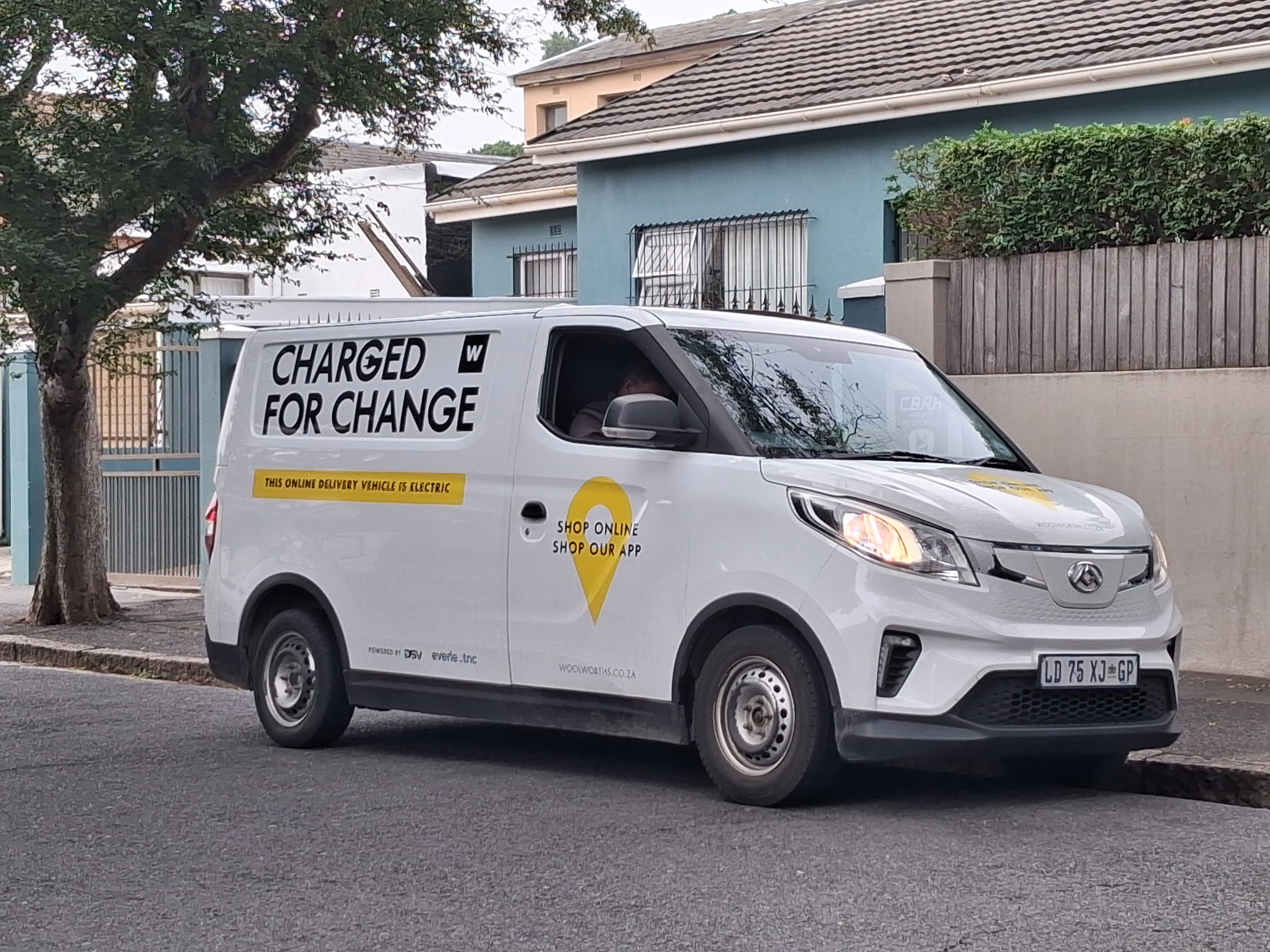
Woolies Maxus eDeliver 3 electric van in Cape Town

==== Zero packaging waste to landfill ====
In June 2018, Woolworths announced its intention to achieve zero packaging waste to landfill by 2022, aiming to ensure that none of its packaging ends up in landfills. This objective requires the use of 100 percent recyclable materials for its packaging, supported by an effective recycling infrastructure. Woolworths also committed to phasing out single-use plastic shopping bags completely by 2020.

In August 2018, the Palmyra Junction store in Claremont introduced in-store recycling vending machines.

==== Reusable bags ====
In October 2018, Woolworths launched an in-store reusable bag trial as part of its efforts to phase out plastic bags. Beginning on 5 November 2018, these new entry-level reusable shopping bags were made available in four stores across the Western Cape – V&A Waterfront, Palmyra Junction, Pinelands, and Steenberg – and have since been rolled out to additional stores.

During the trial, Woolworths Steenberg operated entirely without plastic bags, giving customers the choice of either purchasing a reusable bag or using their own. Single-use plastic bags remained available in the other three stores. In April 2019, additional stores – including those at Maroun Square, Moreleta Village, and Delcairn Centre – were designated as plastic bag–free.

==== Partnership with Pharrell Williams ====
In 2015, Woolworths entered into a partnership with American musician Pharrell Williams, marking the first strategic collaboration of its kind for a South African retailer. Williams assumed the role of Style Director for a series of sustainability-focused projects. The campaign comprised four key elements: entertainment, showcasing young talent, fundraising for education, and promoting sustainable fashion.

=== Black Economic Empowerment Employee Share Ownership Scheme ===
In July 2015, Woolworths announced the maturity of its Black Economic Empowerment Employee Share Ownership Scheme (BEEESOS).

Launched in 2007 as part of the company's Good Business Journey, the scheme forms part of Woolworths’ commitment to socio-economic transformation. The retailer was the first to introduce an empowerment initiative in which BEEESOS shares were allocated to previously disadvantaged employees based on both length of service and seniority. At the time, the scheme accounted for approximately 10% of Woolworths’ ordinary share capital.

Woolworths’ strong performance over the preceding eight years generated R2.4 billion for the scheme's participants, who also received dividends totalling R332 million during the scheme's lifetime.

== Controversies ==
=== Supplier treatment and disagreements ===
In May 2026, it was reported that Beyers Chocolates, a major supplier of confectionary items to Woolworths and manufacturer of its well-known Chuckles brand, was liquidating after over 30 years of operations. This, according to Beyers, was as a result of a recent decision by Woolworths to cancel its orders entirely. Beyers founder and CEO, Kees Beyers, said that Woolworths had pressured the company into an exclusivity contract that prevented the business from expanding and made it too reliant on Woolworths' orders. He said he did not sign the most recent supplier contract for this reason, but continued providing Woolworths with products regardless.

Beyers claimed that, for increased operational sustainability, his company had decided to build a new, entirely separate factory, in which products would be made to supply competing supermarket chains Checkers and Pick n Pay. However, he said that these products were not the same as the ones he provided to Woolworths, and he therefore concluded that he was not in breach of the exclusivity agreement.

Woolworths, on the other hand, stated that part of its competitive edge in the market was from multiple such exclusivity agreements, and that such contracts were common in the retail industry. Woolworths said it had appealed to Beyers not to supply confections to competing supermarkets, saying it was too risky that knowledge pertaining to its specific products could inadvertently be provided to the new factory, resulting in products too similar to its own being supplied to competing retailers. The company said that when Beyers refused, Woolworths proceeded to cancel its orders with the chocolatier. These were reportedly worth approximately R300 million in annual revenue - around half of Beyers' total annual revenue.

Both Kees Beyers and Woolworths CEO Roy Bagattini were interviewed about the matter, and their accounts of what had happened conflicted in numerous ways. It was therefore unclear to the public who, if anyone, was at fault for the situation. Woolworths confirmed it had already secured a new supplier for some of the impacted products, and that it did not expect supply to change in its stores.

Later that same month, a different supplier - Grey’s Marine, made similar public comments about Woolworths. The seafood supplier claimed it had also faced pressure from Woolworths, as well as mistreatment, intimidation, and threats. Grey's had worked with Woolworths for 30 years, and generated more than R200 million in annual revenue at its peak. The company said its relationship with Woolworths gradually deteriorated, and blamed Woolworths for its eventual closure. Woolworths denied responsibility.

As a result of the two supplier complaints, the Democratic Alliance stated that it planned to launch an investigation into South Africa's competition laws. The party said it would not target Woolworths specifically, but rather investigate broader structural issues within South Africa's retail sector. DA MP Toby Chance said that the party believed there was no reason for retailers to apply such strict exclusivity agreements to suppliers, and that the DA would seek to amend the Competition Act as a result of the situation.

=== Christian magazine removal ===
In October 2010, Woolworths faced criticism for its decision to remove Christian magazines from its shelves and discontinue their sale. This move sparked significant backlash from the Christian community, with many calling for a boycott of the retailer. Woolworths maintained that the decision was purely business-driven, with CEO Simon Susman attributing it to declining sales. Following the public outcry, the company reinstated the five magazines to its shelves.

=== Affirmative action ===
In September 2012, Woolworths faced allegations of racial discrimination after being accused of excluding white job applicants and staff. The controversy arose from claims that job advertisements on the company’s career website specified that positions were open only to "African, Coloured, and Indian" candidates.

Following the backlash, Woolworths amended the wording of its job advertisements to state: "In accordance with Woolworths' Employment Equity approach, preference will be given to candidates from designated groups." Various public groups and communities called for a boycott of Woolworths, similar to the response faced by the Dis-Chem pharmaceutical retail group after it announced a policy not to consider white applicants for certain positions.

=== Promotion of LGBTQIA+ merchandise ===
In June 2023, Woolworths faced public criticism from various groups, including religious organisations such as the Muslim Judicial Council and Christian groups, for promoting LGBTQIA+ merchandise to young customers. In response to the backlash, Woolworths issued a statement affirming its commitment to the marketing campaign as part of Pride Month, stating that it would not retract its support.

=== Plagiarism ===
==== Pillow designs ====
In October 2013, Woolworths faced allegations of plagiarism after South African artist Euodia Roets accused the retailer of using her designs without permission. Roets claimed that Woolworths had retained her designs as samples following failed contract negotiations and later used them on a cushion sold in its stores. In an article detailing her allegations, Roets presented side-by-side comparisons of her original artwork and the Woolworths cushion, highlighting the striking similarities. Woolworths denied the allegations on its website.

Roets further alleged that Woolworths had copied text from Wikipedia's Hummingbird article without attribution, in violation of the Creative Commons License. The text featured on the design was an exact match to portions of Wikipedia's content. When questioned about this, the official Woolworths South Africa Twitter account responded, "We've checked with our lawyer; Wikipedia does not own the content."

==== Baby carriers ====
In January 2019, Woolworths withdrew a line of baby carriers following accusations that the design had been copied from South African brand Ubuntu Baba and sold at a significantly lower price. The controversy emerged after Shannon McLaughlin, founder of Ubuntu Baba, published a blog post outlining her claims, which quickly gained traction on social media.

McLaughlin alleged that several of her company's baby carriers had been purchased by Woolworths and delivered to its head office in June 2017, approximately a year before Woolworths launched its own version. Woolworths later admitted that its baby carriers were derivatives of Ubuntu Baba's design and issued a formal apology.

==== Soft drink imitation ====
In early 2012, the South African Advertising Standards Authority (ASA) ruled that Woolworths' Vintage Cold Drink range was an imitation of Frankie's Soft Drinks. The ASA found that Woolworths had intentionally copied the phrase "Good Old Fashioned Soft Drinks" to market its product, thereby infringing on Frankie's intellectual property rights. Woolworths agreed to remove the range immediately. Following the ruling, Woolworths South Africa CEO Ian Moir acknowledged the negative public reaction, stating: "Public opinion is so much against us and, whether we're right or whether we're wrong, customer opinion is against us."

== See also ==
- Retailing in South Africa
