= Timothy Woods (schoolmaster) =

Timothy Phillips Woods (born 24 December 1943) is a South African schoolmaster and educationalist.

One of the sons of Arthur Phillips Woods and his wife Katherine Isabella Woods, he was educated at Cordwalles Preparatory School, Natal, Michaelhouse, Natal, Rhodes University, where he graduated BA (first class Honours) in History, MA and UED, and at the University of Oxford, where he took his degree of DPhil.

A Cape Province Rhodes Scholar in 1968, in 1971 he was appointed an assistant master at Felsted School, Essex, England, where he became Head of History four years later. He was Headmaster of Gresham's School, Holt, from 1982 to 1985 and then Head of History at Trent College, Derbyshire, from 1985 to 2004.

In The Times in 2005 he wrote about the value of hockey, referring to South Africa as "a country dominated by rugby as the major sport in the two winter terms".

== Personal life ==
Woods married Erica Lobb in 1969. He gives his recreations in the British Who's Who as "golf, gardening, music, history and architecture of cathedrals" and his club as Vincent's, Oxford.

He is the brother of David Randle Woods, Vice-Chancellor of Rhodes University from 1996 to 2006.
