= Mona Maclean =

Mona Maclean, Medical Student (1892) was the debut novel of Scottish author and medical practitioner Margaret Todd. It was published under the male pseudonym Graham Travers.

== Plot summary ==
The novel opens with Mona - an orphan and student at the London School of Medicine for Women - failing her Intermediate Examinations. Taking an extended break from her studies, she stays with her distant cousin, Rachel, a shopkeeper in rural Scotland. Rachel asks Mona to conceal her identity as a medical student from the local community and start working with her in the shop. Mona complies but finds the ruse difficult to sustain after she falls for a male medical student, Ralph Dudley, who is staying nearby. By the close of the novel, Mona and Dudley have successfully passed their medical examinations. They get married and set up a joint practice.

== Themes ==
The novel's key themes include women's education and work, female friendships, and marriage. Drawing on Todd's own experiences, the story explores women's roles in the medical profession. Charles Ferrall and Anna Jackson suggest that Mona's story is "largely about the negotiation of class" rather than romance. Mona's middle-class status becomes temporarily strained not only by her choice to pursue a medical vocation, but also by her decision to live with her poor relations.

== Reception ==
The novel was well-received upon its publication and reached fifteen editions by 1900. The Academy described it as ‘one of the freshest and brightest novels of the time’.

In the twenty-first century, Mona Maclean has attracted interest from literary critics and historians due to its positive depiction of a female medical student.
