= Colin Melville =

South African cricketer and educator

Personal information
- Full name: Colin McLean Melville
- Born: 13 July 1903; Carnarvon, Cape Colony
- Died: 12 June 1984 (aged 80); Johannesburg, Transvaal, South Africa
- Batting: Right-handed

Domestic team information
- Years: Team
- 1928: Oxford University

Career statistics
Competition	First-class
Matches	1
Runs scored	29
Batting average	14.50
100s/50s	–/–
Top score	28
Catches/stumpings	1/–
- Source: Cricinfo, 15 June 2020

Colin McLean Melville (13 July 1903 – 12 June 1984) was a South African first-class cricketer and educator.

Melville was born in July 1903 at Carnarvon, Cape Colony. He was educated at Michaelhouse, before going up to the University of Natal. From there, he studied in England at Trinity College at the University of Oxford as a Rhodes Scholar. While at Oxford, Melville made a single appearance in first-class cricket for Oxford University against Kent at Oxford in 1928. Batting twice in the match, he was dismissed in the Oxford first innings for a single run while opening the batting by Bernard Howlett, while in their second innings he was dismissed for 28 runs by Bill Ashdown.

After completing his studies at Oxford, Melville returned to South Africa where he became a master at Michaelhouse between 1929 and 1942. He died at Johannesburg in June 1984.
