= Robert Stevens (lawyer) =

British lawyer and academic (1933–2021)

22nd Master of Pembroke College, Oxford
- In office 1993–2001
- Preceded by: Roger Bannister
- Succeeded by: Giles Henderson

5th Chancellor of the University of California, Santa Cruz
- In office 1987–1991
- Preceded by: Robert Sinsheimer
- Succeeded by: Karl Pister

10th President of Haverford College
- In office 1978–1987
- Preceded by: John Royston Coleman
- Succeeded by: Tom G. Kessinger

Personal details
- Born: 8 June 1933
- Died: 30 January 2021 (aged 87) Oxford
- Relatives: Robin Stevens (daughter)

Academic background
- Education: Keble College, Oxford; Yale University

Academic work
- Discipline: Law
- Sub-discipline: Procedural law
- Institutions: Yale University; Tulane University; Haverford College; University of California, Santa Cruz; Keble College, Oxford

Robert Bocking Stevens (8 June 1933 – 30 January 2021) was a British lawyer and academic.

== Life ==
Stevens was educated at Oakham School and then at Keble College, Oxford, where he obtained his BA and BCL degrees. He was called to the bar in 1956 as a member of Gray's Inn. In 1958, he was awarded an LLM from Yale University. He then became a member of staff there, rising from assistant professor (1959–61) to associate professor (1961–65) and finally to professor (1965–76). He was then Provost of Tulane University, Louisiana from 1976 to 1978, when he became President of Haverford College, Pennsylvania, leaving there in 1987 to become Chancellor of the University of California, Santa Cruz. He left Santa Cruz in 1991, and in 1993 returned to England to take up office as Master of Pembroke College, Oxford. He was on the governing body of Abingdon School from 1994 to 2001.

He left the college in 2001, and was appointed an Honorary Fellow. Since 2001, he was a senior research fellow at the Constitution Unit of University College London.

His writings include The Restrictive Practices Court (1965), In Search of Justice (1968), Welfare Medicine in America (1974), The American Law School (1983) and The English Judges (2002).

His children with his first wife, Rosemary A. Stevens, are Carey Stevens and Richard Stevens. He was married to Kathie Booth Stevens (born 16 December 1948), a retired educator, art historian, and magistrate, until his death at Oxford in January 2021. Their daughter is the children's novelist Robin Stevens.

Academic offices
| Preceded by John Royston Coleman | 10th President of Haverford College; 1978 - 1987 | Succeeded by Tom G. Kessinger |
| Preceded by Robert Sinsheimer | 5th Chancellor of the University of California, Santa Cruz; 1987 – 1991 | Succeeded by Karl Pister |
| Preceded by Roger Bannister | 22nd Master of Pembroke College, Oxford; 1993 - 2001 | Succeeded by Giles Henderson |
