= Gary Ralfe =

Gary Ralfe is a South African businessman and former Managing Director of De Beers Group.

Ralfe was educated at Michaelhouse School, South Africa and the University of Cambridge. In 1966, he joined Anglo American. In 1974, he began working for De Beers. He was appointed managing director of De Beers in 1998. He retired in 2006, while remaining on the board until 2008. Ralfe authored Stars of the Morning: A History of Michaelhouse – 1896 – 2021, which was published in April 2024.
