= Michaelhouse =

Boarding school in Balgowan, South Africa

Coordinates: 29°24′S 30°02′E

- Balgowan, KwaZulu-Natal; South Africa

Information
- Type: Private & Boarding
- Motto: Quis ut Deus
- Religious affiliation: Christianity
- Established: 1896; 130 years ago
- Locale: Rural
- Authority: IEB
- Rector: Bart Wielenga
- Grades: Blocks E - A (grades 8–12)
- Gender: Male
- Age: 13 to 18
- Enrollment: 640 boys
- Language: English
- Colours: Red; White
- Rival: Hilton College; Kearsney College; Maritzburg College
- Tuition: 2025 Annual Board and Tuition E to A Block: ZAR R392 000 incl. tuition and boarding
- Feeder schools: Clifton Preparatory School; Cowan House Preparatory School; Cordwalles Preparatory School; Durban Preparatory High School; Highbury Preparatory School; Merchiston Preparatory School; Pridwin Preparatory School; St. David's Preparatory School; The Ridge Preparatory School; Waterkloof House Preparatory School
- Affiliations: HMC; ISASA
- Website: michaelhouse.org

Michaelhouse is a full boarding senior school for boys founded in 1896. It is located in the Balgowan valley in the Midlands of KwaZulu-Natal, South Africa. The Spear's Schools Index 2025 recognises Michaelhouse as one of the world's 100 leading private schools (Rest of the World category), for demonstrating excellence in academics, innovation and student development.

== History ==
St. Michael's Diocesan College was founded in Pietermaritzburg in 1896 by James Cameron Todd, an Anglican canon. The school was established as a private venture with fifteen boys in two small houses in Loop Street.

James Cameron Todd had a clear idea of what he wanted the school to be. He wrote: "A man's tone, moral and spiritual, as well as intellectual, is largely determined for life by his school."

Within a few years, Michaelhouse became the Diocesan College of Natal, governed by a permanent trust deed and administered by a board of governors.

In 1901 the school relocated to Balgowan, when some 77 boys took up residence in the buildings which remain the core to the school to this day. Its name was later changed to Michaelhouse. The school adopted the 9th century chorale "Stars of the Morning" as its official school hymn.

=== Motto ===
The Latin school motto, Quis ut Deus translates to 'Who like God?', or, less literally, 'Who is like God?'. This motto is derived from the name of the school whose origin stems from the Hebrew Mikha'el which translates to the same. The school hymn, Stars of the Morning, reflects this with the line "'Who like the Lord?' thunders Michael, the Chief."

=== Rectors ===
1. James Cameron Todd (1896–1903)
2. Edward Bertram Hugh Jones (1903–1910)
3. Antony William Scudamore Brown (1910–1916)
4. Eldred Pascoe (1917–1926)
5. Warin Foster Bushell (1927–1930)
6. Ronald Fairbridge Currey (1930–1938)
7. Frederick Rowlandson Snell (1939–1952)
8. Clement Yorke Morgan (1953–1960)
9. Robert 'Tommy' Norwood (1960–1968)
10. Rex Frampton Pennington (1969–1977)
11. Neil Jardine (1978–1986)
12. John Hay Pluke (1987–1996)
13. Reginald Dudley Forde (1997–2001)
14. Guy Norman Pearson (2002–2012)
15. Gregory Theron (2013-2017)
16. Paul Christian Fleischack (2018-2019)
17. Antony Roy Clark (2019-2025)
18. Bart Wielenga (2026-)

=== Relationship with Hilton College ===
Hilton College and Michaelhouse have enjoyed a long history of friendly rivalry. The two schools have much in common and are the only two full boarding schools remaining in KwaZulu-Natal. The schools are located near one another in the KwaZulu-Natal Midlands.

The bond between Hilton and Michaelhouse has developed since 1904 when the two schools played their first rugby match at Hilton College, which Hilton won 11-0. Both schools consider each other their main fixture in all sporting disciplines. The high point of this rivalry is the biannual Hilton-Michaelhouse Day. This event, held alternately between the two schools, sees them play one another in rugby and hockey. The culmination of the day is the main rugby match between the two schools' 1st XVs, which is the oldest continuous rugby fixture in Kwa-Zulu Natal.

== Academics ==
The years of study are referred to as blocks E to A. "A block" is the equivalent of grade 12 or year 12 and has boys aged 17 or 18 and "E block" is the equivalent of grade 8 or year 8 and has boys aged 13 or 14.

Michaelhouse educates boys and has an academic staff of about seventy with a male teaching quotient of approximately 62%; the master(teacher)/pupil ratio is 1:10. Each grade has 6 classes with approximately 21 boys per class.

Michaelhouse school-leavers write the Independent Examinations Board exams and consistently achieve top results.

IEB Results	2017	2018	2019	2020	2021	2022	2023	2024	2025
Number of candidates	107	114	99	108	110	115	117	125	130
Pass rate (%)	100	100	100	100	100	100	100	100	100
University endorsement (%)	98	99	94	99	100	93	100	100	99
Subject A's per boy	2	2,5	2	2,4	3,1	2,3	2	2.6	2.8
A aggregates (%)	23	22	17	23	37	25	20	26	32
Average aggregate mark (%)	72	74	71	73	75	71	72	73	74

The school has produced over 30 Rhodes scholars to study at the University of Oxford and 10 Elsie Ballot scholars to study at the University of Cambridge.

The school hosted the World Individual Debating and Public Speaking Championships in 2002.

== The estate and facilities ==
=== Pietermaritzburg foundation (1896 to 1902) ===
The school was founded in a building in Loop Street, Pietermaritzburg. It had capacity for about 30 boys in total, but it was not long before that became inadequate.

=== Balgowan estate (from 1902) ===
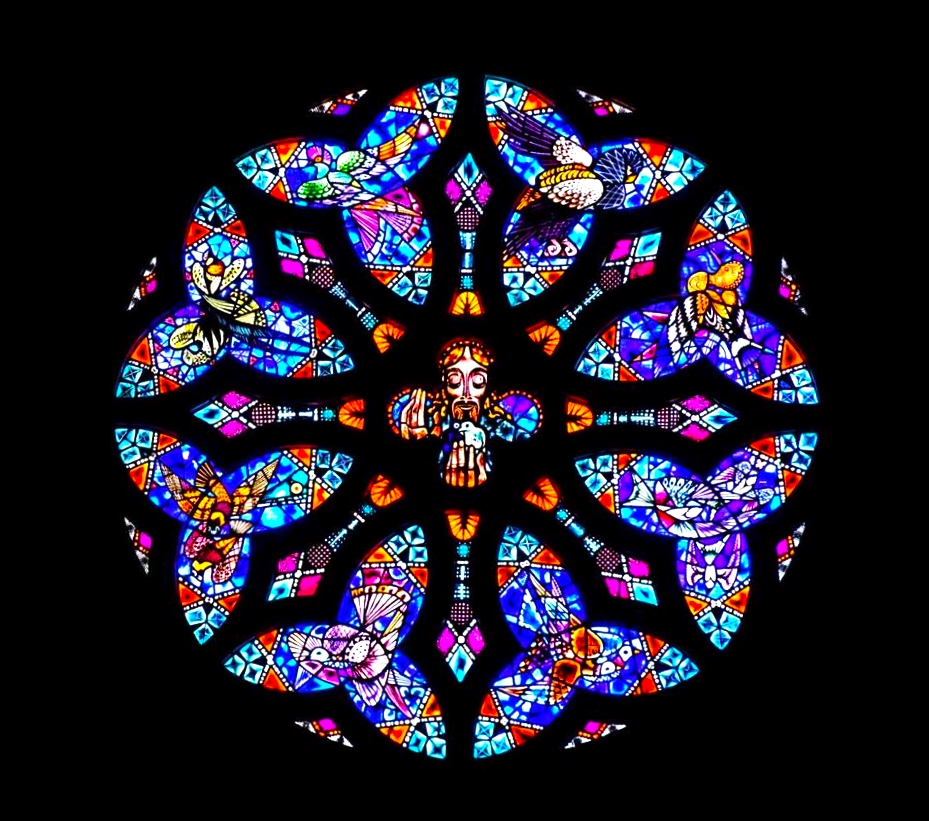
The chapel rose window depicts the head of Christ surrounded by the birds of Natal Province.

Around the turn of the century, approximately 60 acres (24 ha) of land in the picturesque Balgowan valley, approximately 45 minutes north-west of Pietermaritzburg was donated to Rector James Cameron Todd. The buildings were started in 1900 and the school took occupation in 1901. The first buildings to be completed were the existing administration block, vestry and gallery of the now extended chapel, and Founders House.

=== The Michaelhouse Nature Reserve ===
The hill overlooking Michaelhouse is one of the rarer biomes in the country (Midlands mistbelt grassland) and is the preferred habitat for an indigenous antelope, the Oribi.

=== The Estate ===
The original school buildings are made of traditional Pietermaritzburg red brick. The entire school is built in a lattice of quadrangles. It is in fact possible to move from one end of the school buildings to the other without ever having to get wet on a rainy day.

==== Boarding houses ====
There are ten boarding houses. The house system was put in place by Rector Warin Bushell in 1928. Initially, four houses were established but as the school grew the number of houses increased. These are, in order of age, with foundation date in brackets:

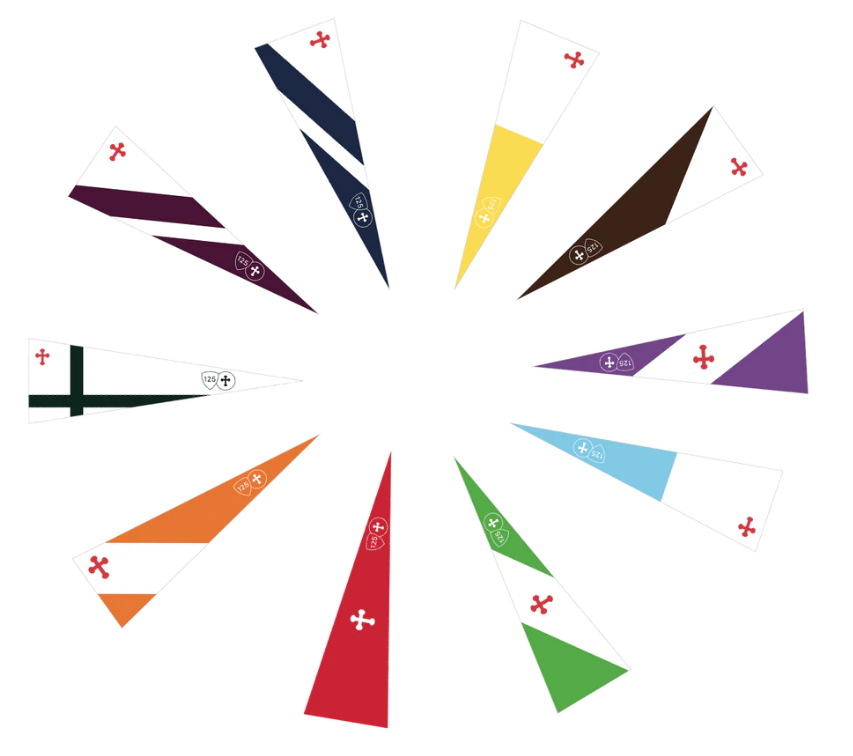
The colours and designs of each house flag

- Founders (1928, formerly called "Rector's" and "Foundation North")
- East (1928, formerly called "Foundation East")
- West (1928, formerly called "Foundation West")
- Farfield (1928)
- Tatham (1935, formerly called "Tathams")
- Pascoe (1940)
- Baines (1956)
- Mackenzie (1995)
- Ralfe (2020)
- McCormick (2020)

Each boarding house houses about 70 boys in dormitories of four to twelve for the younger boys and in double and single rooms for the senior boys.

The boys share two dining halls (one for senior boys and one for juniors) for their meals and are supplied by a kitchen, with an on-site bakery and butchery.

==== The chapel ====
The chapel is an important focal point in the school's architecture and ethos. The chapel was built running from North to South with the apse at the North end.

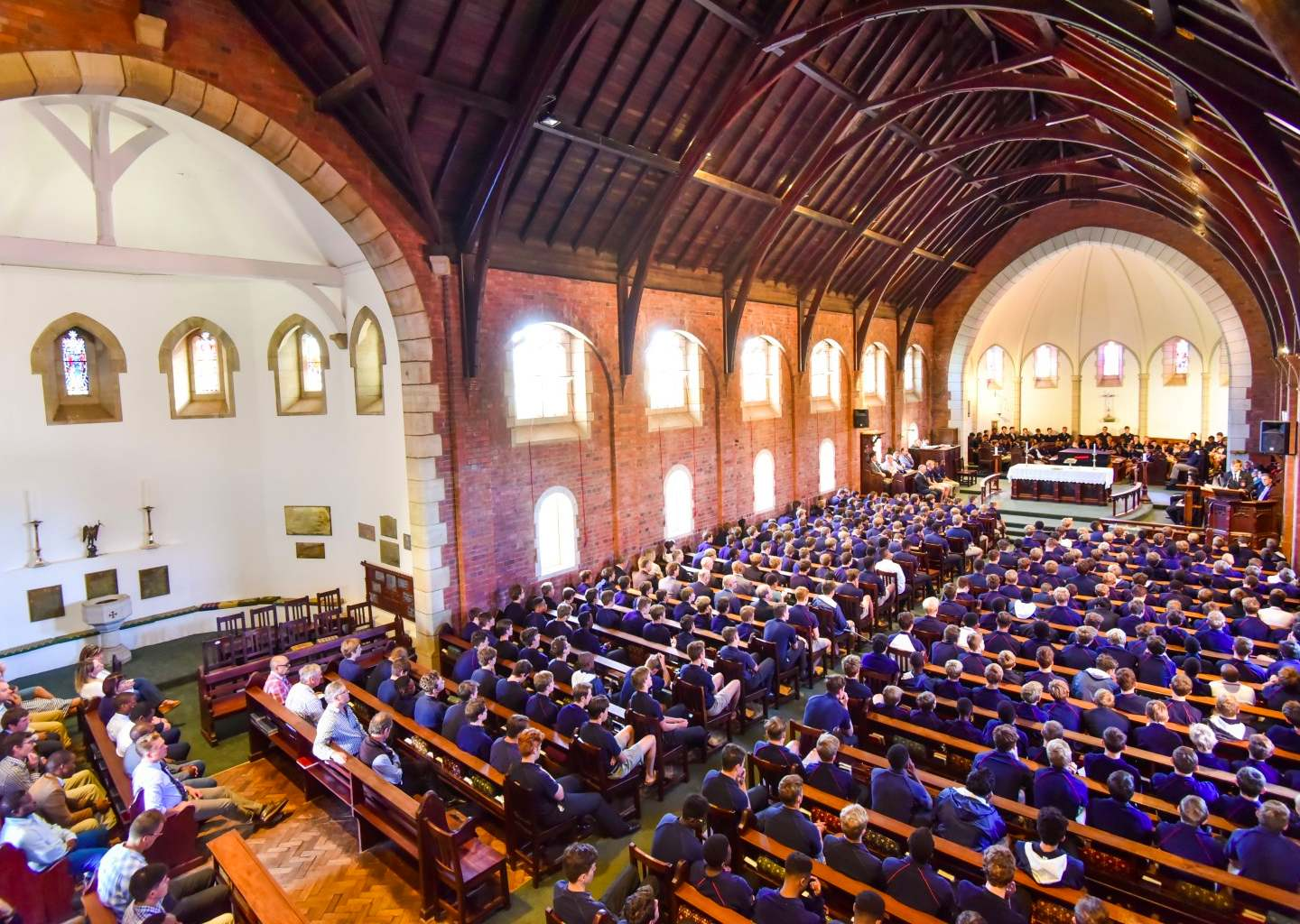
The Michaelhouse Chapel, full school Eucharist, 2019

In the 1940s, however, the chapel was no longer big enough to fit the entire school in for a service. Thus the chapel was extended towards the East. Because of World War II, the chapel was only finished in the 1950s. A memorial to those who died in World War II is outside the entrance to the chapel.

The original chapel now forms the gallery and vestry. The apse of the old chapel is used as a baptism font. The extended chapel can seat nearly 600 people. Beneath the new chapel is a crypt which is used for smaller prayer meetings and services. The crypt can seat 30 people.

The stained glass windows featured in the Sir Herbert Baker designed chapel, include the Michaelhouse rose window, created by Ervin Bossanyi depicting the head of Christ surrounded by the birds of Natal Province at the rear of the chapel. There is also a series of lancet windows in the sanctuary by Margaret Agnes Rope depicting the Virgin and child, flanked by the Archangels Michael and Gabriel and Samuel as a boy, King David as a young man, John the Baptist as a child and the boy with the loaves and fishes. The pews are made of solid teak.

The chapel has a bell-tower, installed in the 1950s with a carillon of eight bells. It has been a tradition (with unknown origins) that only boys from Tatham House may ring the bells. The bells are rung before each chapel service (there are three services a week, although not all are compulsory).

==== The Schlesinger Theatre ====
A 550-seat theatre was built and completed in 1976. It was opened at a ceremony by Elizabeth Sneddon in 1976. The theatre hosts a variety of performances, mainly aimed at the resident population of pupils. However, the theatre is open to the local community. Many performers give a one night performance on their way between runs in Johannesburg and Durban.

The Schlesinger theatre is one of a number of facilities at the school that was funded by an old boy.

==== The Indoor Centre ====
The construction of the Inglis Indoor Centre was finally completed in the month of August 2006. It is named after James Inglis, a past chairman of the Board of Governors. In summer it is used for basketball and cricket and has three courts that can be used simultaneously as well as 4 indoor turf cricket nets, whilst during winter it is used for indoor hockey.

The centre also features a cafeteria/restaurant which is available to the pupils as well as the public, and accommodation for visiting teams to stay overnight.

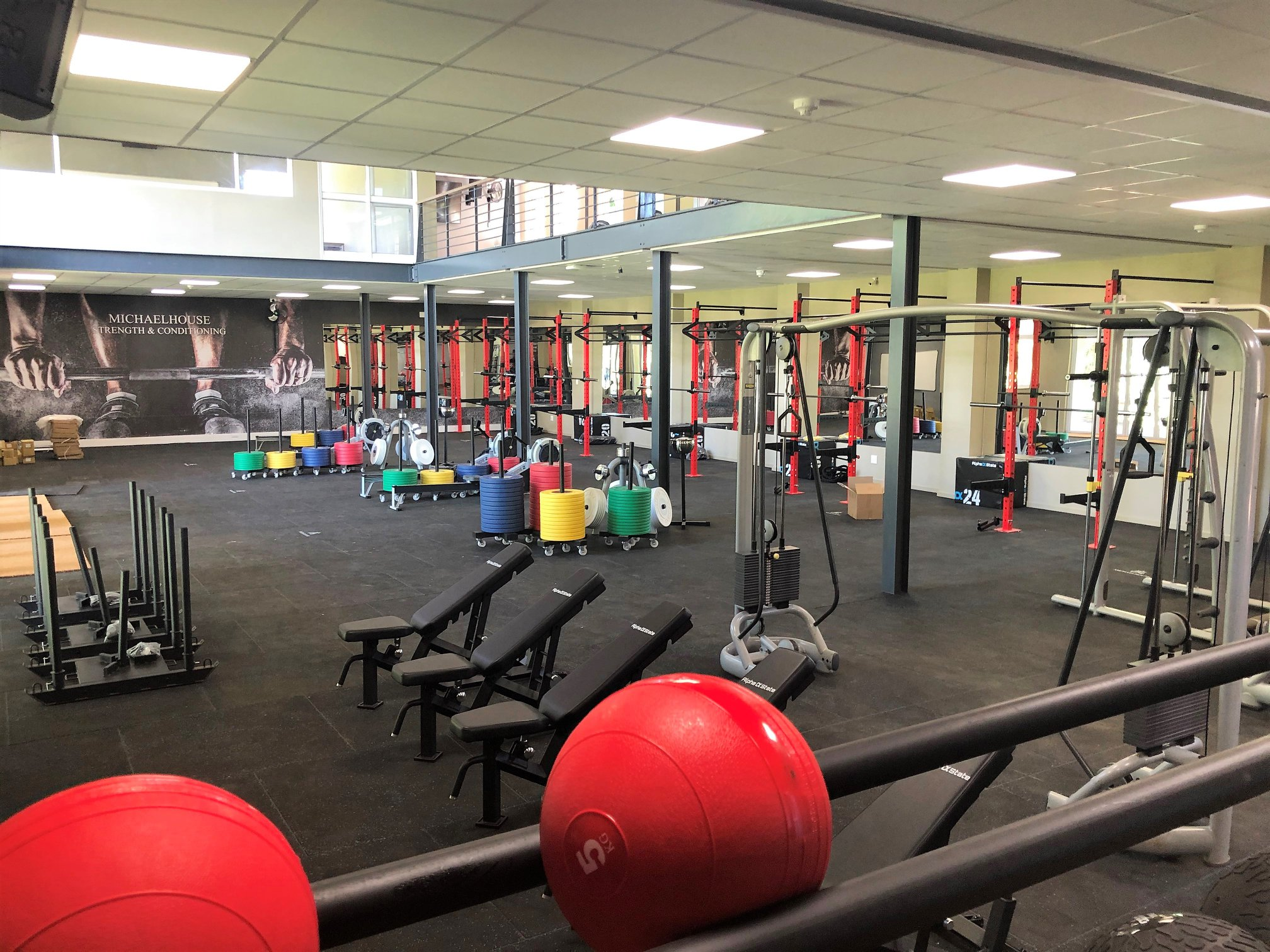
High Performance Sports Centre, 2022

==== Other features ====
The library is stocked with over 16,000 books and has an adjoining 50 seat lecture theatre. There are four Science laboratories, three Biology laboratories and four computer centres. The school has a sanatorium and laundry service. The staff reside on the estate.

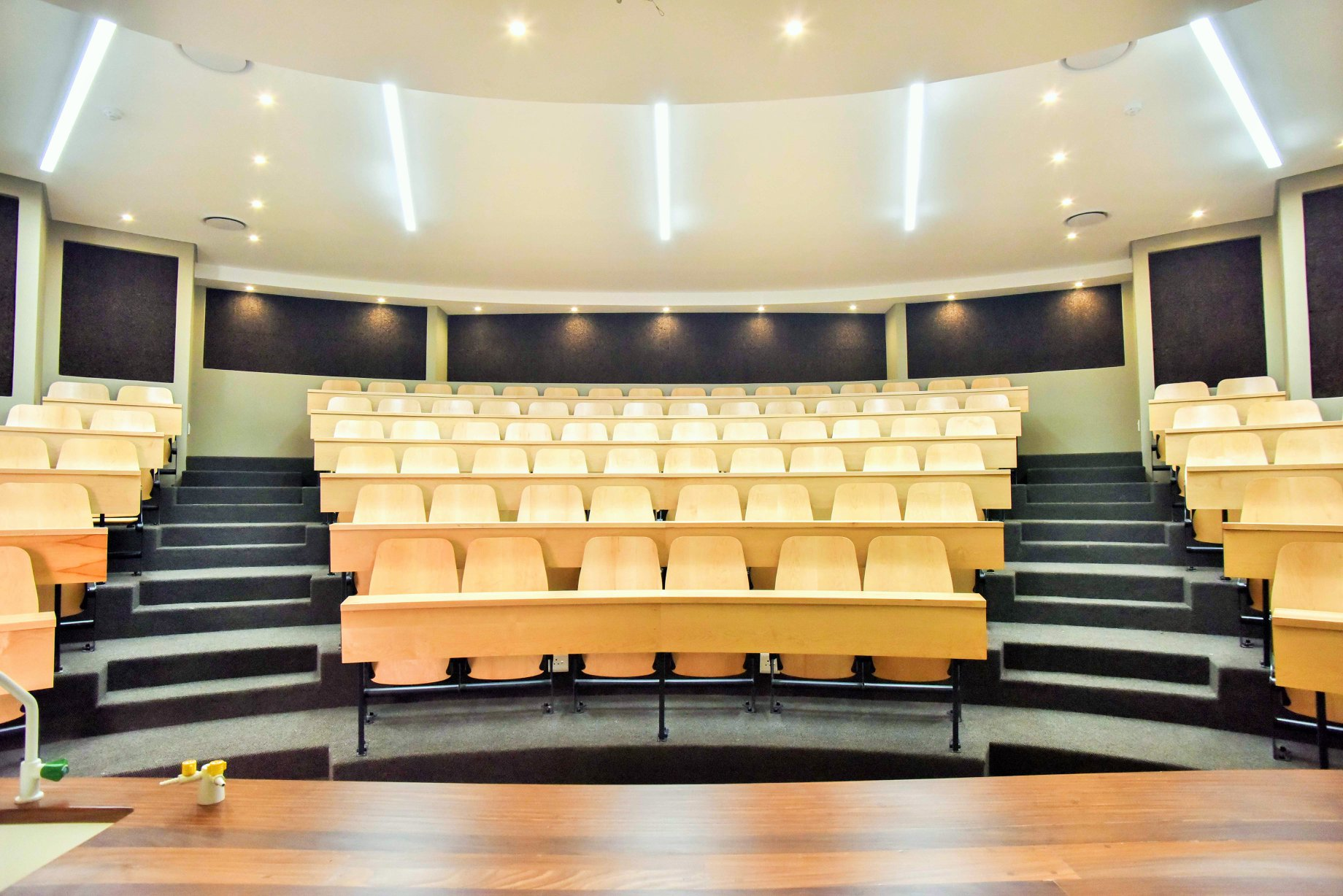
Lecture room, 2019

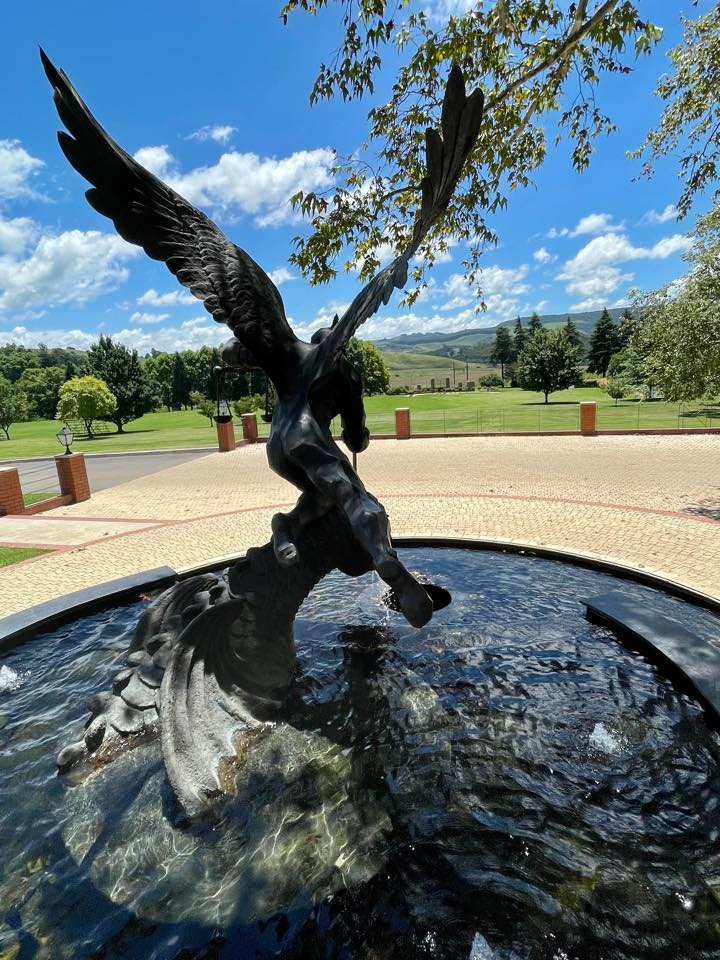
Statue of the Archangel Michael at the front of the school looking out to the Balgowan valley.

=== Sporting facilities ===
There are 11 playing fields:

- Willows - named after the Willow trees that stand along its length.
- Vlei - an Afrikaans name meaning marsh or bog. This is because of the field's affinity for flooding during heavy rains.
- Meadows - used as the main rugby field.
- Far Meadows - adjacent to Meadows
- Holleys
- Tarpeys - grew millet during World War II to feed the school.
- Baileys - the former main rugby field. Moved to Meadows when seating the hundreds of fans on its small banks became a problem
- Aitkens Astroturf - formerly a grass pitch, the astroturf was completed in 2001.
- Punchbowl Astroturf -It was a junior cricket oval, the new astroturf was completed in 2019.
- Hannahs - a senior cricket oval.
- Roy Gathorne Oval - the first team's cricket oval, named after Roy Gathorne.

These include six turf cricket pitches, two artificial astroturf hockey surfaces, a heated swimming pool (12 lanes by 25 metres), a heated water polo pool, eight tennis courts, a weight training facility, a six court squash complex, a golf driving range with artificial putting green, an indoor sports centre (used primarily for basketball and indoor hockey - the facility also houses four artificial surface indoor cricket practice nets) and a dam for canoeing.

=== Hosting of Paraguay national football team ===
The nearby Woodridge Estate hosted the Paraguay team for the 2010 FIFA World Cup, and Michaelhouse was chosen to be the team's training base for the tournament.

== Alumni organisation ==
Since the school was founded in 1896, it has produced approximately 8700 alumni. Around 6650 are living. Alumni are members of the Michaelhouse Old Boys' Club. The Club was founded on Whit Monday, 1 June 1903. The School's Founder (Reverend James Cameron Todd) was the Club's first President. The Club is headquartered in the Heritage Centre on the school campus.

== Notable alumni ==
The year of matriculation is given in brackets, where it is known.

- Rennie Airth (1952), novelist
- Dale Benkenstein (1992), Dolphins, Proteas and Durham cricket player, Proteas batting coach.
- Stephen Bird, Australian sprint canoeist, represented Australia at the 2012 Summer Olympics and the 2016 Summer Olympics
- Rupert Bromley, 10th Bt. (1952), Rhodes scholar and businessman
- David H.M.Brooks (1967), philosopher and author of "The Unity of the Mind"
- Peter Brown (1941), activist and founding member of the Liberal Party
- Michael Cassidy (1953) - evangelist
- Pat Cilliers (2005), Sharks, Lions, Stormers and Springbok rugby player
- Gary Porter (rugby union) Zimbabwe Rugby International
- Ruan Combrinck (2008), Lions and Springbok rugby player
- Sir John Craven, director of Reuters and Deutsche Bank
- Ross Cronjé, Lions and Springbok rugby player
- Robbie Diack (2003), Ulster Rugby and Ireland Rugby Union footballer, formerly of Western Province
- Patrick Dorehill (1938), Royal Air Force bomber pilot - flew the daring Augsburg raid in 1942.
- George Ellis (Cantab) (1955), scientist and author (co-written book with Stephen Hawking)
- Sir John Fieldsend, the first Chief Justice of Zimbabwe
- Nicholas Folker (1994), South African swimmer, represented SA at the 1999 All-Africa Games and the 2000 Summer Olympics
- Henry Fotheringham (1970), a retired South African cricketer who played in seven unofficial Test matches and fifteen unofficial One Day Internationals
- Warrick Fynn, cricketer
- John Harker (1972), retired Natal and Springbok swimmer
- Chick Henderson (1947), rugby union footballer and commentator
- Giles Henderson (1958), Master of Pembroke College, Oxford
- Paul Hepker (1984), film composer (Tsotsi)
- Craig Higginson, International novelist and playwright
- Robert Holmes à Court, entrepreneur and Australia's first billionaire
- Patrick Howard, Western Province, Munster and Newport Gwent Dragons rugby player
- Patrick Lambie (2008), Sharks and Springbok rugby player
- Sir Ian Lloyd (Cantab), British politician and Conservative MP
- Tufty Mann, former South African cricketer
- Don MacLeod (Oxon), Natal cricketer and chairman of Illovo Sugar
- Colin Melville, cricketer and schoolmaster, later taught at Michaelhouse
- Alan Melville, Captain South African cricket team.
- Paul Nash (1964), a South African sprinter who tied the 100-metre world record four times in 1968 with a time of 10.0 seconds.
- Chris Nicholson, High Court judge in the Natal Provincial Division who declared charges against Jacob Zuma were unlawful
- Gary Ralfe (1961), former managing director of De Beers
- Michael Rhodes, Stormers and Saracens rugby player
- Mark Richards, South African Sevens rugby player
- Desmond Sacco (1958), Chairman of Assore
- David 'the Kiffness' Scott (2005), musician
- Richard Scott, Baron Scott of Foscote (1951), British barrister and judge
- Wilbur Smith (1950), bestselling novelist
- Barry Streek, political journalist and anti-apartheid activist
- Rex Tremlett, gold prospector
- Paul Trewhela, journalist, communist and political prisoner
- John van de Ruit (1993), playwright and author of Spud
- Timothy Woods (1961), schoolmaster
- Jean van der Westhuyzen (2017), Australian canoeist, 2020 Summer Olympics gold medalist

== Feeder schools ==
- Clifton Preparatory School, Nottingham Road, KwaZulu-Natal
- Highbury Preparatory School, KwaZulu-Natal
- Cordwalles Preparatory School, KwaZulu-Natal
- Clifton School, Durban
- The Ridge School, Gauteng
- Pridwin Preparatory School, Gauteng
- Cowan House Preparatory School, KwaZulu-Natal
- Merchiston Preparatory School, Kwazulu-Natal
- Waterkloof House Preparatory School, Gauteng
- St. Peter's Preparatory School, Gauteng
- Durban Preparatory High School, KwaZulu-Natal
- St. Davids Preparatory School, Gauteng
- St. Peter's Preparatory School, Gauteng

== See also ==
- List of boarding schools
