= Clover Industries =

Dairy company in South Africa

Clover Industries Limited
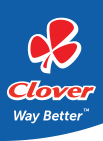
- Trade name: Clover
- Industry: Fast-moving consumer goods
- Headquarters: Johannesburg, South Africa
- Area served: Southern Africa
- Key people: JH Voster (CEO); WI Büchner (chairman)
- Number of employees: ± 50,000
- Website: www.clover.co.za

Clover Industries Limited ("Group" and/or "Clover") is a branded foods and beverages group that used to be listed on the main board of the Johannesburg Stock Exchange. The company was delisted after a takeover by Milco, led by the Central Bottling Company from Israel.

== History ==
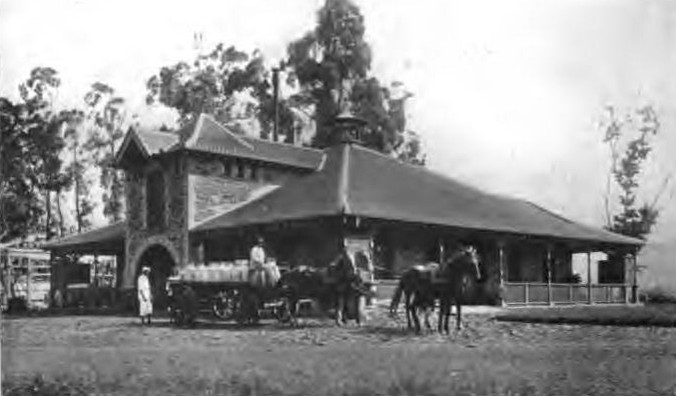
The dairy farm of Joseph Baynes at Nel's Rust, Natal, before 1903.The building is today a museum and a Provincial Heritage Site

Clover's history began in 1898 with a series of meetings among a group of farmers in the lush pastures of the Natal Midlands.

1898 – Farmers meet in Mooi River to discuss the establishment of a butter factory. At follow-up meetings the name Natal Creamery Ltd and co-operative principles are approved.

1899 – Joseph Baynes starts the first butter factory in Natal on his farm Nel's Rust. Due to the absence of proper legal channels to register a co-operative, Natal Creamery Ltd is registered under the Natal Companies Act and H Blaker is appointed as the first chairman.

1901 – The first reference is made to Model Dairy as a partnership between Natal Creamery Ltd and Joseph Baynes Ltd for the marketing of fresh milk in Durban. This partnership breaks up in October 1901.

1902 – Milk distribution by Natal Creamery Ltd commences in Pietermaritzburg.

1903 – Milk is dispatched to Johannesburg on a daily basis and Natal Creamery Ltd decides to investigate the Johannesburg milk industry.

1906 – Natal Creamery Ltd takes over the Johannesburg Milk Supply Company Ltd.

1908 – Heilbron Government Creamery is established.

1923 – Natal Creamery Ltd is registered under the Co-operatives Societies Act of 1922.

1932 – By 1932 Natal Creamery Ltd is operating in 32 centres countrywide.

1934 – The operation of a 100% co-operative style system is approved and the name Natal

Creamery Ltd is changed to National Co-operative Dairies Ltd.

1994 – Clover S.A. (Pty) Ltd is established.

1995 – Clover S.A. (Pty) Ltd and Compagnie Gervais Danone ("Danone") join forces as joint venture partners.

1997 – Clover Holdings Ltd is established to act as a holding company for Clover S.A. (Pty) Ltd.

1998 – Danone and Clover S.A. (Pty) Ltd form the Danone Clover (Pty) Ltd joint venture.

2003 – The conversation of National Co-operative Dairies Ltd from a co-operative to a public company took place during November 2003. A name change to Clover Industries Ltd was also approved during a series of special general meetings. The dynamics incorporated in Clover Industries Ltd in respect of ordinary shares exercising control and preferential shared being freely tradable, opens a new era for the Group. Clover S.A. (Pty) Ltd and Danone form the Clover Danone Beverages Ltd joint venture.

2004 – Clover Holdings Ltd is unbundled. Clover Industries Ltd is the new holding company of Clover S.A. (Pty) Ltd, one of the largest branded consumer goods companies in South Africa, South Africa's largest dairy company and one of the leading manufacturers and marketers of food products in South Africa.

2005 – Hosken Consolidated Investments Ltd acquires a 25.1% shareholding in Clover Industries Ltd as a BBBEE partner.

2006 – Clover S.A. (Pty) Ltd and Fonterra Ltd of New Zealand form the Clover Fonterra Ingredients (Pty) Ltd joint venture.

2007 – Hosken Consolidated Investments Ltd, the BBBEE partner, exercises its option to increase its ordinary shareholding to 34.9% and Clover S.A. (Pty) Ltd buys 39.8% of the shares in Clover Danone Beverages Ltd from Danone. The company's name is changed to Clover Beverages Ltd.

2008 – Danone Clover (Pty) Ltd acquires a 70% interest in Mayo Dairy (Pty) Ltd.

2009 – Deconsolidation/Recapitalisation of Danone Clover (Pty) Ltd.

2010 – Clover sells its 45% shareholding in Danone Clover (Pty) Ltd to Danone and commences with the capital restructuring of Clover Industries Limited. Removal of the condition that only milk producers may hold ordinary shares and de-linking the ordinary share from milk supply. Repurchase of 34.9% ordinary shares from Hosken Consolidated Investments Ltd. Conversion of preference shares to debt-only instruments. Clover Industries Limited was listed on the main board of the JSE Limited on 14 December 2010.

2011 – Buy-out of the non-controlling interest in Clover Beverages Limited and the subsequent transfer of the non-alcoholic beverages business to Clover SA.

2012 – Bought the Real Juice Co. Holdings (Pty) Ltd from AVI Limited. Acquired the minority interest in Clover Botswana (Pty) Ltd and Clover Manhattan (Pty) Ltd respectively.

2013 – Clover Waters (Pty) Ltd (in terms of which Clover owns 70% and Nestlé owns 30% is formed) is created resulting in the expansion of Clover's portfolio of value-added and branded beverage products. Clover is associated with global brands such as Nestlé Purelife and Nestea which opens up opportunities in the sub-Saharan market.

2014 – Clover Futurelife joint venture is established to launch a functional dairy based product. Various other initiatives are currently being explored.

2019 - Clover delists from the JSE after a takeover by Milco.

== Controversy ==
Prior to its $354 million sale of 59.5% to Milco, a newly formed consortium of the Central Bottling Company (CBC), the deal was met with opposition by BDS, the Palestine Solidarity Alliance, Palestine Solidarity Campaign and the South African Jews for a Free Palestine. BDS SA spokesman Tisetso Magama said that CBC “has operations in Israel’s illegal settlements – both in the occupied Palestinian West Bank and in the occupied Syrian Golan Heights,” adding that “CBC and its subsidiaries own a regional distribution centre in the illegal Israeli Atarot settlement industrial zone, a vineyard near Mount Shifon in the occupied Golan Heights and a dairy farm, as well as offices in the illegal Israeli settlement of Shadmot Mehola in the Jordan Valley – all in violation of international law.”

Brimstone Investments, one of the initial consortium members of the deal, pulled out.

Several trade unions in South Africa were against the approval of the deal: In a joint statement, trade unions such as the General Industries Workers Union of South Africa and Food and Allied Workers Union representing workers at Clover and its subsidiaries, together with their union federation, South African Federation of Trade Unions and Palestinian solidarity organizations in South Africa, “condemned the recent judgment by the Competition Tribunal of South Africa on the takeover of Clover by Israeli-led company, Milco SA.” They cited three main objections to the deal, claiming that “the takeover will have negative consequences for South African workers who will face job losses in the context of an already-struggling economy,” as well as “manipulative, unethical and anti-competitive practices by... the CBC... against which there are adverse findings in Israel,” and claims that the “CBC violation of international law, including UN resolutions and Geneva Conventions and the violation of human rights.”

== Business ==
Today, Clover is a branded consumer goods and products group operating in South Africa and other selected African countries in:

• The production of dairy and non-alcoholic beverages;

• The distribution of chilled and ambient consumer products; and

• The sales and merchandising of fast-moving consumer goods

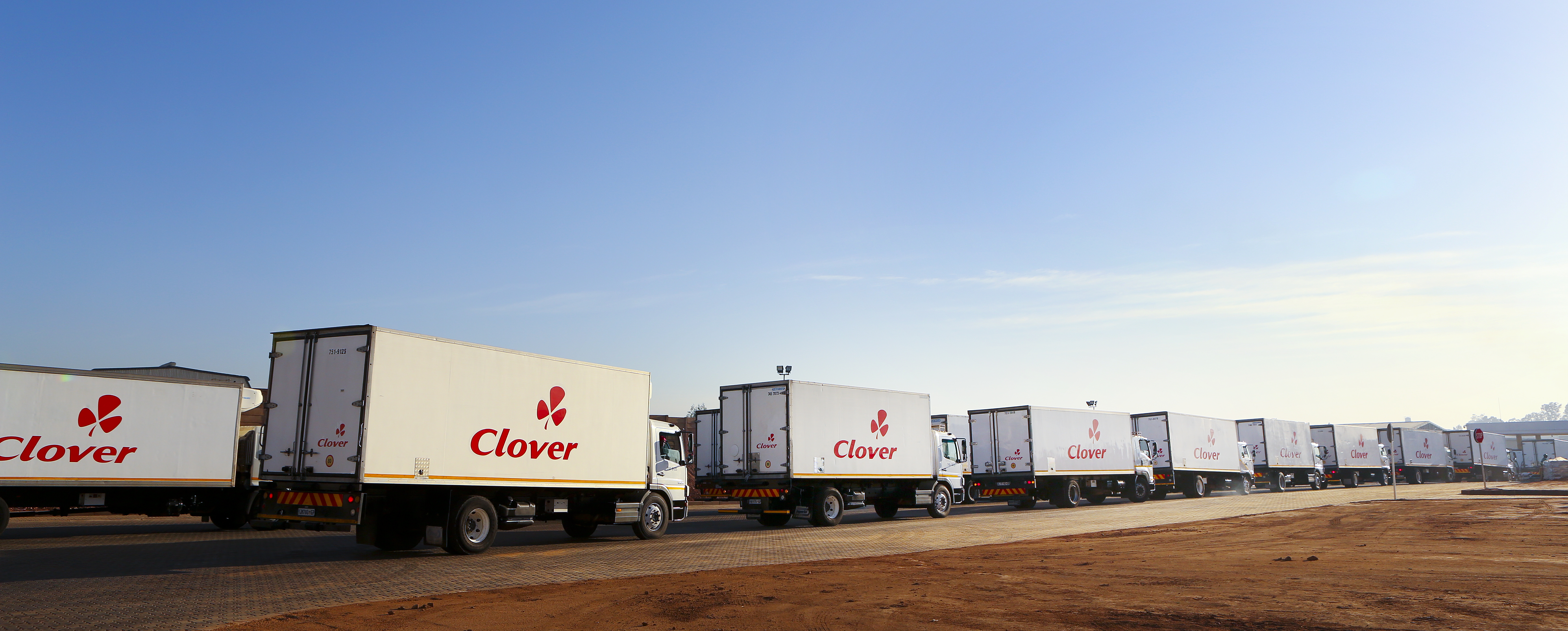
Delivery trucks lining up early in the morning at Clover's central distribution centre in Clayville, Johannesburg.

Clover was converted from a co-operative society into a public company in 2003.

Clover implemented a capital restructuring on 31 May 2010, which was a milestone in its corporate development and resulted in both economic benefits and voting control vesting in the ordinary shares. In addition, the delinking of the ordinary shares from the milk delivery agreements enabled persons other than dairy producers to acquire ordinary shares, facilitating its ability to raise equity capital. Capital scarcity has historically been a key constraint for Clover's growth and development.
