= Chick Henderson (rugby union) =

Scotland international rugby union player (1930–2006)

- Born: John Hamilton Henderson; 9 February 1930 Johannesburg, Gauteng, South Africa
- Died: 21 November 2006 (aged 76) Johannesburg, Gauteng, South Africa
- School: Michaelhouse
- University: Witwatersrand University; Oxford University

Rugby union career
Provincial / State sides
Years	Team	Apps	(Points)
–	Transvaal		
International career
Years	Team	Apps	(Points)
–	Scotland		

John Hamilton "Chick" Henderson (9 February 1930 – 21 November 2006) was a South African rugby union player and commentator.

== Biography ==
Henderson was born in Johannesburg on 9 February 1930. He was educated at Michaelhouse, the University of the Witwatersrand and the University of Oxford. He played rugby for the Transvaal and Scotland and later became nationally known as a radio and subsequently television commentator. He was a founder member of The Quagga Rugby Club and Life President of the South African Barbarians.

He was also chairman of his engineering company.

Chick Henderson died in Johannesburg after a long illness caused by a heart condition. He was 76 years old.
