= Balgowan, KwaZulu-Natal =

Balgowan
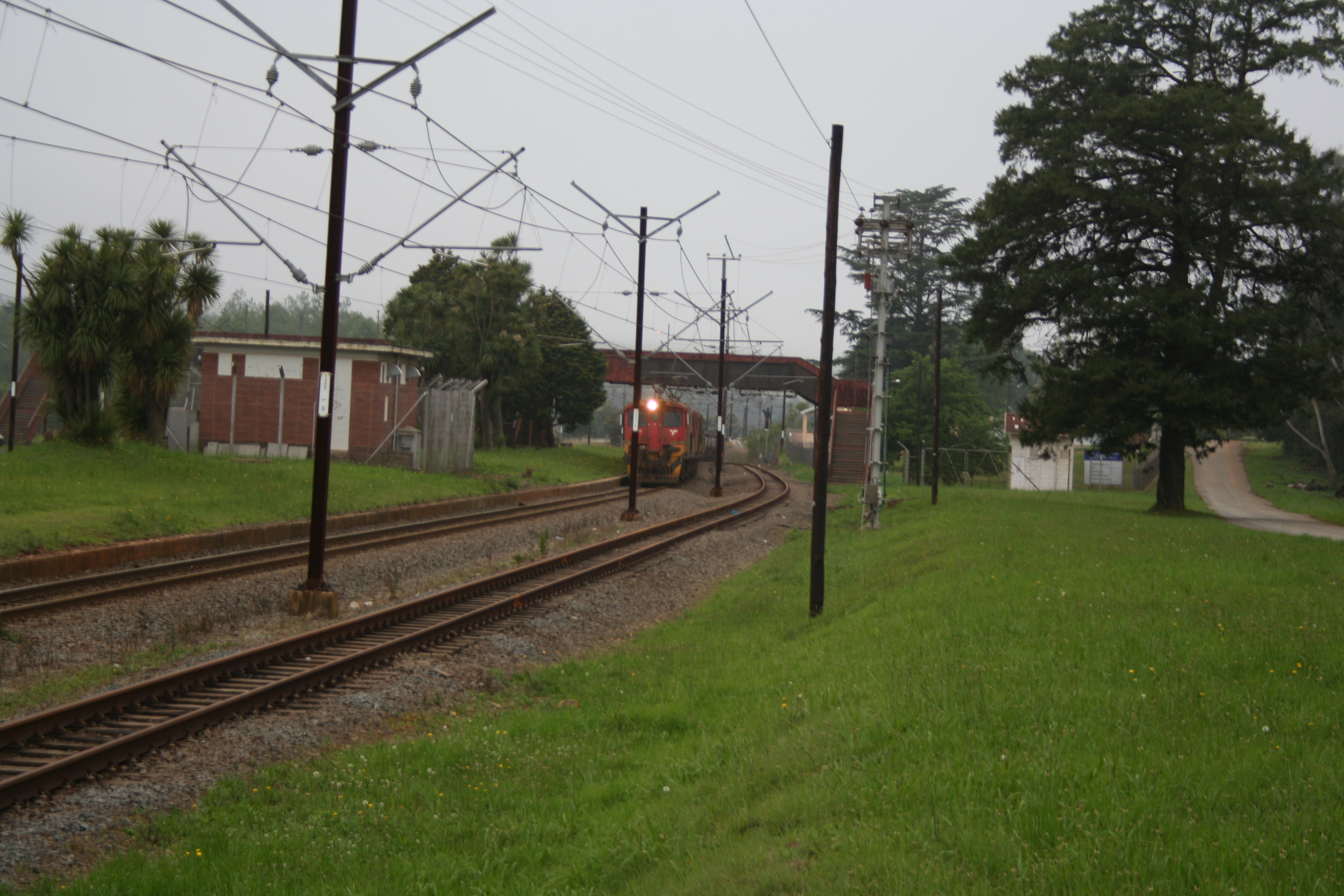
- A goods train approaching Balgowan station

- Location within KwaZulu-Natal Location within South Africa Location within Africa
- Coordinates: 29°23′55″S 30°2′50″E
- Country: South Africa
- Province: KwaZulu-Natal
- District: uMgungundlovu
- Municipality: uMngeni

Area
  - Total: 3.84 km^{2} (1.48 sq mi)

Population (2011)
  - Total: 980
  - Density: 260/km^{2} (660/sq mi)

Racial makeup (2011)
  - Black African: 40.6%
  - Coloured: 2.9%
  - Indian/Asian: 4.9%
  - White: 50.8%
  - Other: 0.9%

First languages (2011)
  - English: 48.6%
  - Zulu: 37.0%
  - Afrikaans: 10.7%
  - Xhosa: 1.2%
  - Other: 2.5%
- Time zone: UTC+2 (SAST)
- PO box: 3275

Balgowan is a valley in the KwaZulu-Natal Midlands in South Africa.

The town of Balgowan is not much more than an old trading store and a train station where locally grown timber is picked up. However, nearby is Michaelhouse, the Anglican boarding school for boys in the Diocese of Natal, an exclusive private boarding school. The school complex, built in the English gothic style from red Pietermaritzburg brick, includes a chapel which is open to the public, featuring a stained glass rose window by Ervin Bossanyi and seven lancet windows by Margaret Agnes Rope.

As elsewhere in the KwaZulu-Natal Midlands, Balgowan has some wealthy farmers, mostly in the timber production industry (pine and eucalyptus) or in dairy and cattle farming. Popular niche soft drinks manufacturer Frankie's Soft Drinks Company is located in the town.

The Midlands Meander, a scenic tourist route featuring arts and crafts, restaurants and accommodation, runs through Balgowan on the R103 road.
