= Sunday Times CNA Literary Awards =

Annual South African literature awards

The Sunday Times CNA Non-Fiction Award
- Sponsored by: CNA
- Country: South Africa
- Presented by: Sunday Times
- Formerly called: Alan Paton Award
- Reward: R100 000
- First award: 1989; 37 years ago

The Sunday Times CNA Fiction Award
- Sponsored by: CNA
- Country: South Africa
- Presented by: Sunday Times
- Formerly called: Barry Ronge Fiction Prize; Sunday Times Fiction Prize
- Reward: R100 000
- First award: 2001; 25 years ago

The Sunday Times CNA Literary Awards are awarded annually to South African writers by the South African weekly newspaper the Sunday Times. They comprise the Sunday Times CNA Literary Award for Non-fiction and the Sunday Times CNA Literary Award for Fiction, and are awarded for full-length non-fiction works and novels, respectively. Both winners receive R100 000. Ivan Vladislavic is the only person to have won both the fiction and the non-fiction award.

== History of the Awards ==
Originally established in 1989, the Alan Paton Award was conferred annually for meritorious works of non-fiction. It aimed to reward books presenting "the illumination of truthfulness, especially those forms of it that are new, delicate, unfashionable and fly in the face of power," and demonstrating "compassion, elegance of writing, and intellectual and moral integrity." The award was named for Alan Paton, the famous South African author of Cry, The Beloved Country (1948).

In 2001, a companion award for fiction was established, the Sunday Times Fiction Prize. The criteria stipulate that the winning novel should be one of "rare imagination and style... a tale so compelling as to become an enduring landmark of contemporary fiction." The prize was restructured in 2015 when fiction and non-fiction awards were brought together as the Sunday Times Literary Awards; the money for each prize was increased, from R75 000 to R100 000, and the Fiction Prize was renamed the Barry Ronge Fiction Prize in honour of Barry Ronge, a renowned South African journalist who was one of the founders of the awards.

In 2020, there was a one-year hiatus due to the COVID-19 pandemic. However, the awards recommenced in 2021 with a new sponsor, CNA, a South African retail chain of stationery shops, and are now known as the Sunday Times CNA Literary Awards. This sponsorship arrangement followed the acquisition of CNA from "embattled" parent company Edcon in February 2020. In 2021, books published between 1 December 2018 and 1 December 2020 were eligible.

== Fiction winners ==
Works shortlisted for the fiction prize, 2008–2024
Year	Nominee	Work	Result	Ref.
2026	Sven Axelrad	The Nicotine Gospel	Shortlisted	
2026	Ashraf Kagee	Song of the Slave Girl	Shortlisted	
2026	Michelle Kekana	The Fragile Mental Health of Strong Women	Shortlisted	
2026	Lindani Mbunyuza-Memani	Buried in the Chest	Shortlisted	
2026	Claire Robertson	The Immortalities	Shortlisted	
2025	Shubnum Khan	The Lost Love of Akbar Manzil	Won	
2025	Sven Axelrad	God's Pocket		
2025	Barbara Boswell	The Comrade's Wife		
2025	Karen Jennings	Crooked Seeds		
2025	Siphiwe Gloria Ndlovu	The Creation of Half-Broken People		
2024	Andrew Brown	The Bitterness of Olives	Won	
2024	Sven Axelrad	Buried Treasure		
2024	Morabo Morojele	Three Egg Dilemma		
2024	David Ralph Viviers	Mirage		
2024	Jarred Thompson	The Institute for Creative Dying		
2023	C. A. Davids	How to Be a Revolutionary	Won|	
2023	Andrew Brown	The Heist Men		
2023	Siphiwe Gloria Ndlovu	The Quality of Mercy		
2023	Yewande Omotoso	An Unusual Grief		
2023	Mark Winkler	The Errors of Dr Browne		
2022	Tshidiso Moletsane	Junx	Won	
2022	Karen Jennings	An Island		
2022	Joanne Joseph	Children of Sugarcane		
2022	Thenjiwe Mswane	All Gomorrahs Are The Same		
2022	Damon Galgut	The Promise		
2021	Marguerite Poland	A Sin of Omission	Won	
2021	Dawn Garisch	Breaking Milk		
2021	Siphiwe Gloria Ndlovu	The History of Man		
2021	Rešoketšwe Manenzhe	Scatterlings		
2021	Mark Winkler	Due South of Copenhagen		
2020	No award due to the COVID-19 pandemic			
2019	Siphiwe Gloria Ndlovu	The Theory of Flight	Won	
2019	John Hunt	The Boy Who Could Keep a Swan in His Head		
2019	Nozizwe Cynthia Jele	The Ones with Purpose		
2019	Claire Robertson	Under Glass		
2019	Mark Winkler	Theo & Flora		
2018	Harry Kalmer	A Thousand Tales of Johannesburg	Won	
2018	Maxine Case	Softness of the Lime		
2018	S. J. Naudé	The Third Reel		
2018	Lesego Rampolokeng	Bird-Monk Seding		
2018	Francois Smith	The Camp Whore		
2017	Zakes Mda	Little Suns	Won	
2017	Bronwyn Law-Viljoen	The Printmaker		
2017	Kopano Matlwa	Period Pain		
2017	Yewande Omotoso	The Woman Next Door		
2017	Mark Winkler	The Safest Place You Know		
2016	Nkosinathi Sithole	Hunger Eats a Man	Won	
2016	Alastair Bruce	Boy on the Wire		
2016	Craig Higginson	The Dream House		
2016	Claire Robertson	The Magistrate of Gower		
2016	Henrietta Rose-Innes	Green Lion		
2015	Damon Galgut	Arctic Summer	Won	
2015	Imraan Coovadia	Tales of the Metric System		
2015	Masande Ntshanga	The Reactive		
2015	Elaine Proctor	The Savage Hour		
2015	Zoë Wicomb	October		
2014	Claire Robertson	The Spiral House	Won	
2014	Lauren Beukes	The Shining Girls		
2014	Dominic Botha	False River		
2014	Songeziwe Mahlangu	Penumbra		
2014	Eben Venter	Wolf Wolf		
2013	Karen Jayes	For the Mercy of Water	Won	
2013	Imraan Coovadia	The Institute for Taxi Poetry		
2013	Steven Boykey Sidley	Entanglement		
2013	Chris Wadman	The Unlikely Genius of Dr Cuthbert Kamazuma		
2013	James Whyle	The Book of War		
2012	Michiel Heyns	Lost Ground	Won	
2012	H.J. Golakai	The Lazarus Effect		
2012	Henrietta Rose-Innes	Nineveh		
2012	Yewande Omotoso	Bom Boy		
2012	Adam Schwartzmann	Eddie Signwriter		
2011	Sifiso Mzobe	Young Blood	Won	
2011	Shaida Kazie Ali	Not a Fairy Tale		
2011	James Clelland	Deeper than Colour		
2011	Deon Meyer	Thirteen Hours		
2011	Ivan Vladislavic	Double Negative		
2010	Imraan Coovadia	High Low In-between	Won	
2010	J. M. Coetzee	Summertime		
2010	Zinaid Meeran	Saracen at the Gates		
2010	Kgebetli Moele	The Book of the Dead		
2010	Sally-Ann Murray	Small Moving Parts		
2009	Anne Landsman	The Rowing Lesson	Won	
2009	Tracey Farren	Whiplash		
2009	Damon Galgut	The Impostor		
2009	Michiel Heyns	Bodies Politic		
2009	Mandla Langa	The Lost Colours of the Chameleon		
2008	Ceridwen Dovey	Blood Kin	Won	
2008	Justin Cartwright	The Song Before it is Sung		
2008	J. M. Coetzee	Diary of a Bad Year		
2008	Andrew Gray	The Fence		
2008	Niq Mhlongo	After Tears		
2007	Marlene van Niekerk	Agaat (trans. Michiel Heyns)	Won	
2007	Imraan Coovadia	Green-Eyed Thieves		
2007	Morabo Morojele	How We Buried Puso		
2007	David Medalie	The Shadow Follows		
2006	Andrew Brown	Coldsleep Lullaby	Won	
2006	J. M. Coetzee	Slow Man		
2006	André Brink	Praying Mantis		
2006	Russel Brownlee	Garden of the Plagues		
2006	Consuelo Roland	The Good Cemetery Guide		
2005	Justin Cartwright	The Promise of Happiness	Won	
2004	Rayda Jacobs	Confessions of a Gambler	Won	
2003	André Brink	The Other Side of Silence	Won	
2002	Ivan Vladislavic	The Restless Supermarket	Won	
2001	Zakes Mda	The Heart of Redness	Won	

== Non-fiction winners ==
Works shortlisted for the non-fiction prize, 2006-2024
Year	Nominee	Work	Result	Ref.
2026	Popina Khumanda	The Smallest Ones: Two Sisters' Escape from DRC Rebels and Their Pursuit of Freedom	Shortlisted	
2026	Antjie Krog	Blood's Inner Rhyme: An Autobiographical Novel	Shortlisted	
2026	Roger Lucey	How to Build a House in the Mountains	Shortlisted	
2026	Jeff Wicks	The Shadow State: Why Babita Deokaran Had to Die	Shortlisted	
2026	Tanya Zack	The Chaos Precinct: Johannesburg as a Port City	Shortlisted	
2025	Khumisho Moguerane	Morafe: Person, Family and Nation In Colonial Bechuanaland 1880s-1950s	Won	
2025	Jonathan Jansen	Breaking Bread: A Memoir		
2025	Margie Orford	Love and Fury: A Memoir		
2025	Beverley Roos-Muller	Hunting the Seven: How the Gugulethu Seven Assassins Were Exposed		
2025	Lebogang Seale	One Hundred Years of Dispossession: My Family’s Quest to Reclaim Our Land		
2024	Jonny Steinberg	Winnie and Nelson: Portrait of a Marriage	Won	
2024	Eve Fairbanks	The Inheritors: An Intimate Portrait of South Africa’s Racial Reckoning		
2024	Justin Fox	Place: South African Literary Journeys		
2024	Justice Malala	The Plot to Save South Africa: The Week Mandela Averted Civil War and Forged a New Nation		
2024	Caster Semenya	The Race to Be Myself		
2023	Bulelwa Mabasa	My Land Obsession: A Memoir	Won	
2023	Liz McGregor	Unforgiven: Face to Face with My Father’s Killer		
2023	André Odendaal, with editorial contributions by Albie Sachs	Dear Comrade President: Oliver Tambo and the Foundations of South Africa’s Constitution		
2023	Matthew Wilhelm-Solomon	The Blinded City: Ten Years in Inner-City Johannesburg		
2023	Songezo Zibi	Manifesto: A New Vision for South Africa		
2022	Mignonne Breier	Bloody Sunday: The Nun, The Defiance Campaign and South Africa's Secret Massacre	Won	
2022	Tembeka Ngcukaitobi	Land Matters: South Africa's Failed Land Reforms and the Road Ahead		
2022	Imraan Coovadia	The Poisoners: On South Africa's Toxic Past		
2022	Thula Simpson	History of South Africa: From 1902 to the Present		
2022	Johnny Clegg	Scatterling of Africa: My Early Years		
2021	Andrew Harding	These Are Not Gentle People	Won	
2021	Jacob Dlamini	Safari Nation: A Social History of the Kruger National Park		
2021	Mark Gevisser	The Pink Line: Journeys Across the World’s Queer Frontiers		
2021	Pieter-Louis Myburgh	Gangster State: Unravelling Ace Magashule’s Web of Capture		
2021	Telita Snyckers	Dirty Tobacco: Spies, Lies and Mega-Profits		
2020	No award due to the COVID-19 pandemic			
2019	Terry Kurgan	Everyone is Present: Essays on Photography, Family and Memory	Won	
2019	Anneliese Burgess	Heist! South Africa’s Cash-in-Transit Epidemic Uncovered		
2019	Panashe Chigumadzi	These Bones Will Rise Again		
2019	Rekgotsofetse Chikane	Breaking a Rainbow, Building a Nation: The Politics Behind the #MustFall Movements		
2019	Sylvia Neame	Imprisoned: The Experience of a Prisoner Under Apartheid		
2018	Bongani Ngqulunga	The Man Who Founded the ANC: A Biography of Pixley ka Isaka Seme	Won	
2018	Stuart Doran	Kingdom, Power, Glory: Mugabe, Zanu and the Quest for Supremacy (1960–87),		
2018	Thandeka Gqubule	No Longer Whispering to Power: The Story of Thuli Madonsela		
2018	Sisonke Msimang	Always Another Country: A Memoir of Exile and Home		
2018	Thuli Nhlapo	Colour Me Yellow: Searching for My Family Truth		
2017	Greg Marinovich	Murder at Small Koppie: The Real Story of the Marikana Massacre	Won	
2017	Sean Christie	Under Nelson Mandela Boulevard: Life Among the Stowaways		
2017	Christa Kulijan	Darwin's Hunch: Science, Race, and the Search for Human Origins		
2017	Dikgang Moseneke	My Own Liberator: A Memoir		
2017	Steven Robins	Letters of Stone: From Nazi Germany to South Africa		
2016	Pumla Dineo Gqola	Rape: A South African Nightmare	Won	
2016	David Attwell	J.M. Coetzee and the Life of Writing		
2016	Maxine Case	Papwa: Golf's Lost Legend		
2016	Khaya Dlanga	To Quote Myself: A Memoir		
2016	Charles van Onselen	Showdown at the Red Lion		
2015	Jacob Dlamini	Askari: A Story of Collaboration and Betrayal in the Anti-Apartheid Struggle	Won	
2015	Mark Gevisser	Lost and Found in Johannesburg		
2015	Lindie Koorts	DF Malan and the Rise of Afrikaner Nationalism		
2015	Maria Phalime	Postmortem: The Doctor Who Walked Away		
2015	Jonny Steinberg	A Man of Good Hope		
2014	Max du Preez	A Rumour of Spring: South Africa after 20 Years of Democracy	Won	
2014	Vusi Pikoli and Mandy Wiener	My Second Initiation: The Memoir of Vusi Pikoli		
2014	Karen Schoeman	Portrait of a Slave Society: The Cape of Good Hope 1717 – 1795		
2014	Elizabeth van Heyningen	The Concentration Camps of the Anglo-Boer War: A Social History		
2014	Shaun Viljoen	Richard Rive: a Partial Biography		
2013	Redi Tlhabi	Endings and Beginnings: A Story of Healing	Won	
2013	Julian Rademayer	Killing for Profit		
2013	Jacques Pauw	Rat Roads: One Man’s Incredible Journey		
2013	Xolela Mangcu	Biko: A Biography		
2013	Hermann Giliomee	The Last Afrikaner Leaders		
2012	Hugh Lewin	Stones Against the Mirror: Friendship in the Time of the South African Struggle	Won	
2012	Jonny Steinberg	Little Liberia: An African Odyssey in New York		
2012	Anton Harber	Diepsloot		
2012	Mandy Wiener	Killing Kebble		
2012	Andrew Feinstein	The Shadow World: Inside the Global Arms Trade		
2012	McIntosh Polela	My Father, My Monster		
2011	Ronnie Kasrils	The Unlikely Secret Agent	Won	
2011	Adriaan Basson	Finish and Klaar: Selebi’s Fall from Interpol to the Underworld		
2011	David Klatzow and Sylvia Walker	Steeped in Blood: The Life and Times of a Forensic Scientist		
2011	Jay Naidoo	Fighting for Justice		
2011	Bill Nasson	The War for South Africa: The Anglo-Boer War: 1899-1902		
2010	Albie Sachs	The Strange Alchemy of Life and Law	Won	
2010	Kevin Bloom	Ways of Staying		
2010	André Brink	A Fork in the Road		
2010	Antjie Krog	Begging to be Black		
2010	James Ngculu	The Honour to Serve: Recollections of an Umkhonto Soldier		
2009	Peter Harris	In a Different Time	Won	
2009	Andrew Brown	Street Blues: The Experiences of a Reluctant Policeman		
2009	Pippa Green	Choice, Not Fate: The Life and Times of Trevor Manuel		
2009	Ahmed Kathrada with Tim Couzens	A Simple Freedom		
2009	Peter Harris	In a Different Time: The Inside Story of the Delmas Four		
2008	Mark Gevisser	Thabo Mbeki – The Dream Deferred	Won	
2008	George Bizos	Odyssey to Freedom		
2008	Charles van Onselen	The Fox and the Flies		
2007	Ivan Vladislavic	Portrait with Keys	Won	
2007	Glynis Clacherty	The Suitcase Stories		
2007	John Allen	Rabble-Rouser for Peace		
2007	Fred Khumalo	Touch My Blood		
2007	Denis Hirson	White Scars		
2006	Edwin Cameron	Witness to AIDS	Won	
2006	Adam Levin	AidSafari	Won	
2006	Antony Altbeker	The Dirty Work of Democracy: A Year on the Streets with the Saps		
2006	Ronald Suresh Roberts	No Cold Kitchen: A Biography of Nadine Gordimer		
2006	William N. Zulu	Spring Will Come		
2005	Jonny Steinberg	The Number: One Man's Search for Identity in the Cape Underworld and Prison Gangs	Won	
2004	Pumla Gobodo-Madikizela	A Human Being Died That Night	Won	
2003	Jonny Steinberg	Midlands	Won	
2002	Jonathan Kaplan	The Dressing Station: A Surgeon's Chronicle of War and Medicine	Won	
2001	Henk van Woerden	A Mouthful of Glass	Won	
2000	Anthony Sampson	Mandela: The Authorised Biography	Won	
1999	Antjie Krog	Country of My Skull	Won	
1999	Stephen Clingman	Bram Fischer: Afrikaner Revolutionary	Won	
1998	John Reader	Africa: A Biography of a Continent	Won	
1997	Charles van Onselen	The Seed is Mine	Won	
1996	Margaret McCord	The Calling of Katie Makanya	Won	
1995	Nelson Mandela	Long Walk to Freedom	Won	
1994	Breyten Breytenbach	Return to Paradise	Won	
1993	Tim Couzens	Tramp Royal	Won	
1992	Thomas Pakenham	Scramble for Africa	Won	
1991	Albie Sachs	Soft Vengeance of a Freedom Fighter	Won	
1990	Jeff Peires	The Dead Will Arise	Won	
1989	Marq de Villiers	White Tribe Dreaming	Won	
