= Nadia Davids =

South African playwright and novelist (born 1977)

- Born: Cape Town, South Africa
- Education: Zonnebloem Girls School; St Cyprian's School; University of Cape Town
- Occupations: Playwright, novelist, author of short stories and screenplays
- Notable work: What Remains
- Awards: Olive Schreiner Prize, 2020; Caine Prize, 2024
- Website: www.nadiadavids.com

Nadia Davids (born 1977) is a South African playwright, novelist, and author of short stories and screenplays. Her work has been published, produced, and performed in Southern Africa, Europe, and the United States. She was a Philip Leverhulme Prize winner in 2013. Her play What Remains won five Fleur du Cap Theatre Awards in 2018.

In 2017, Davids was elected president of PEN South Africa, serving in the role until July 2024.

Her short stories and articles have appeared in a range of outlets, including The Georgia Review, Zyzzyva magazine, Astra Magazine, The American Scholar, New Writing from Africa (edited by J. M. Coetzee, 2009), Los Angeles Review of Books, the Johannesburg Review of Books, and The Brooklyn Rail. Davids won the 2024 Caine Prize for African Writing for her short story "Bridling", which was described by the chair of judges as a "triumph of language, storytelling and risk-taking".

== Early life and education ==
Nadia Davids was born in 1977 in Cape Town, South Africa, where she grew up.

She was educated first at Zonnebloem Girls School – one of the oldest, most storied schools in the Cape, located at the edge of District Six – and later at St Cyprian's School. She has recalled: "As a child, performance and reading were my preferred modes of imaginative play. ...I staged lots of plays with my sister and the neighbourhood kids. In my final year of high school, in 1995, I took my first play to the National Arts Festival in Grahamstown. It was a devised work using South African poetry, projected photographs, dance and narration to chart the country’s transition from Apartheid to democracy".

In June 2008, she received a PhD in drama from the University of Cape Town (UCT) for her thesis entitled "Inherited Memories; Performing the Archive", which explored the history, memory and trauma of forced removals from District Six under the Group Areas Act during the Apartheid era in South Africa, through the lens of performance and a pioneering reading of Marianne Hirsch's theory of "post memory" onto the landscape of District Six.

== Career ==
Davids held a Mellon Fellowship between 2000 and 2005, and was a visiting scholar at UC Berkeley (2001) and New York University (2004–05).

She was one of 10 playwrights participating in the New York-based Women's Project Theater's Playwrights' Lab for 2008–10.

She took up a full-time lecturing position in the Drama Department at the Queen Mary University of London in September 2009.

In 2018, she joined the University of Cape Town's English Department as an associate professor, where she lectured until June 2022.

Her second novel, Cape Fever, was published by Scribner in 2025.

== Other activities ==
In July 2017, Davids was elected president of PEN South Africa, taking over tenure from Margie Orford. In 2020, Davids initiated the organisation's podcast "The Empty Chair", which brings together South African and American writers in conversation about literature and social justice, and by 2023, it was among the top 15 per cent of podcasts listened to globally. In July 2024, Davids stepped down as the organization's president, welcoming Bongani Kona as the incoming new president of PEN South Africa.

== Personal life ==
As of 2024 Davids lives in Los Angeles, California.

== Works ==
Davids' work is disseminated through a variety of forms – journal articles, live performances, published play texts, film documentaries, a novel – to a range of audiences (commercial, academic/educational).

At Her Feet (2002–12), a one-woman show centred on Cape Muslim women's identities post 9/11 performed by acclaimed South African actor Quanita Adams, and Cissie (2008–11), a play exploring feminist biography, the historiography of District Six, and archival storytelling through the theatrical imagining of anti-apartheid activist Cissie Gool's life, serve as good examples. At Her Feet first played at the Arena Theatre in 2002 and Cissie debuted at the National Arts Festival in Grahamstown in July 2008.

Both works have garnered theatre awards and nominations (five Fleur du Cap Theatre Awards, one Noma, one Naledi), and have been staged internationally (in Africa, Europe, the United States at venues such as Market Theatre, Baxter Theatre, Southbank Centre, and at the Grahamstown National Arts Festival, Afrovibes, and the London Book Fair). The plays are studied at a range of universities (University of Cape Town, Stanford University, New York University, SOAS, University of Warwick and York University) and are high-school set-works throughout South Africa. They are understood within these contexts as opening up unexpected spaces in which the lives of South African — specifically Muslim Capetonian — women, assume the central focus. At Her Feet was one of the first theatrical works to emerge in response to 9/11 and remains one of the only plays narrating the lives of Capetonian Muslim women. Described by Njabulo Ndebele as "Unforgettable... Art of the highest order", it returned to the Baxter in 2018 for its final run, starring Quanita Adams.

Davids' first novel, An Imperfect Blessing, was published in April 2014 by Random House Struik-Umuzi, and in December 2014 was announced as one of three books shortlisted for the Etisalat Prize for Literature. The novel was longlisted for the Sunday Times Award and shortlisted for the UJ Prize.

At the end of 2014, she began writing her play What Remains – about slavery at the Cape, "and the haunted city, about ghosts and property developers, about archives and madness, about history, memory and magic, about paintings, protests and the now" – which was staged at the Main Festival at the Grahamstown National Arts Festival in 2017, directed by Jay Pather, and featuring Denise Newman, Faniswa Yisa, Shaun Oelf and Buhle Ngaba. Sold out at Grahamstown, the play went on to a sold-out run at Hiddingh Hall in Cape Town, and was performed at the 2017 Afrovibes Festival in Holland. What Remains was hailed as a "beautiful masterpiece" in the Cape Times; it was later nominated for seven Fleur du Cap Theatre awards and won five, including Best New South African Play, Best Director, Best Ensemble, Best Actress and Best Lighting Design. An extract of What Remains appears in Margaret Busby's 2019 anthology New Daughters of Africa.

In May 2016, Davids hosted a BBC podcast on Shakespeare in South Africa.

In 2022, the Baxter Theatre in Cape Town staged her most recent play, Hold Still, "a challenging take on issues of migrancy, as seen through the eyes of a family still haunted by the ghosts of the past". Davids' script was described as "a work of beauty – lyrical, smart, contemporary, questioning" and as "dramatically taut but carves a space for lyricism, with sharp exchanges of dialogue offset by poetic monologues. It is also, by turns, poignant and politically astute; it tackles current affairs head-on without pontificating or compromising the audience's immersion in the world of the play."

== Awards ==
- Winner of the Rosalie van der Gught Prize at the Fleur de Cap Awards in the category of Best New Director in 2004 for At her Feet
- Finalist in the South Africa Pen Award adjudicated by Nobel Prize laureate J. M. Coetzee for her short story "Safe Home" in 2006, and in 2009 she was placed third for "The Visit"
- Nominated for the Noma Award for her play At Her Feet in 2007
- Nominated for three Fleur du Cap Awards, including "Best New South African Play" for Cissie in 2008
- Philip Leverhulme Prize for her research on Prestwich Place, a slave-burial ground in Cape Town
- Nominated for seven Fleur du Cap Awards for What Remains in 2017. The play went on to win in five categories in the 2018 awards: Best New South African Play (Nadia Davids), Best Director (Jay Pather), Best Ensemble, Best Actress (Faniswa Yisa) and Best Lighting Design (Wilhelm Disbergan).
- 2020 Olive Schreiner Prize for Drama, for What Remains: A Play in One Act
- 17 September 2024, Caine Prize for African Writing for her short story "Bridling", originally published in the Georgia Review in 2023. Chika Unigwe, the chair of the judging panel – which also included Julianknxx, Siphiwe Gloria Ndlovu, Tumi Molekane (aka Stogie T), and Ayesha Harruna Attah – described the story as "an impressive achievement, a triumph of language, storytelling and risk-taking while maintaining a tightly controlled narrative about women who rebel. It embodies the spirit of the Caine Prize, which is to celebrate the richness and diversity of short stories by African writers. That is to say, to challenge the single story of African literature."

== Publications ==
- An Imperfect Blessing (novel), Random House Struik-Umuzi, 2014
- Davids, Nadia (9 December 2025). Cape Fever. New York: Simon and Schuster. ISBN 978-1-6680-9073-2.
