= Masande Ntshanga =

South African writer (born 1986)

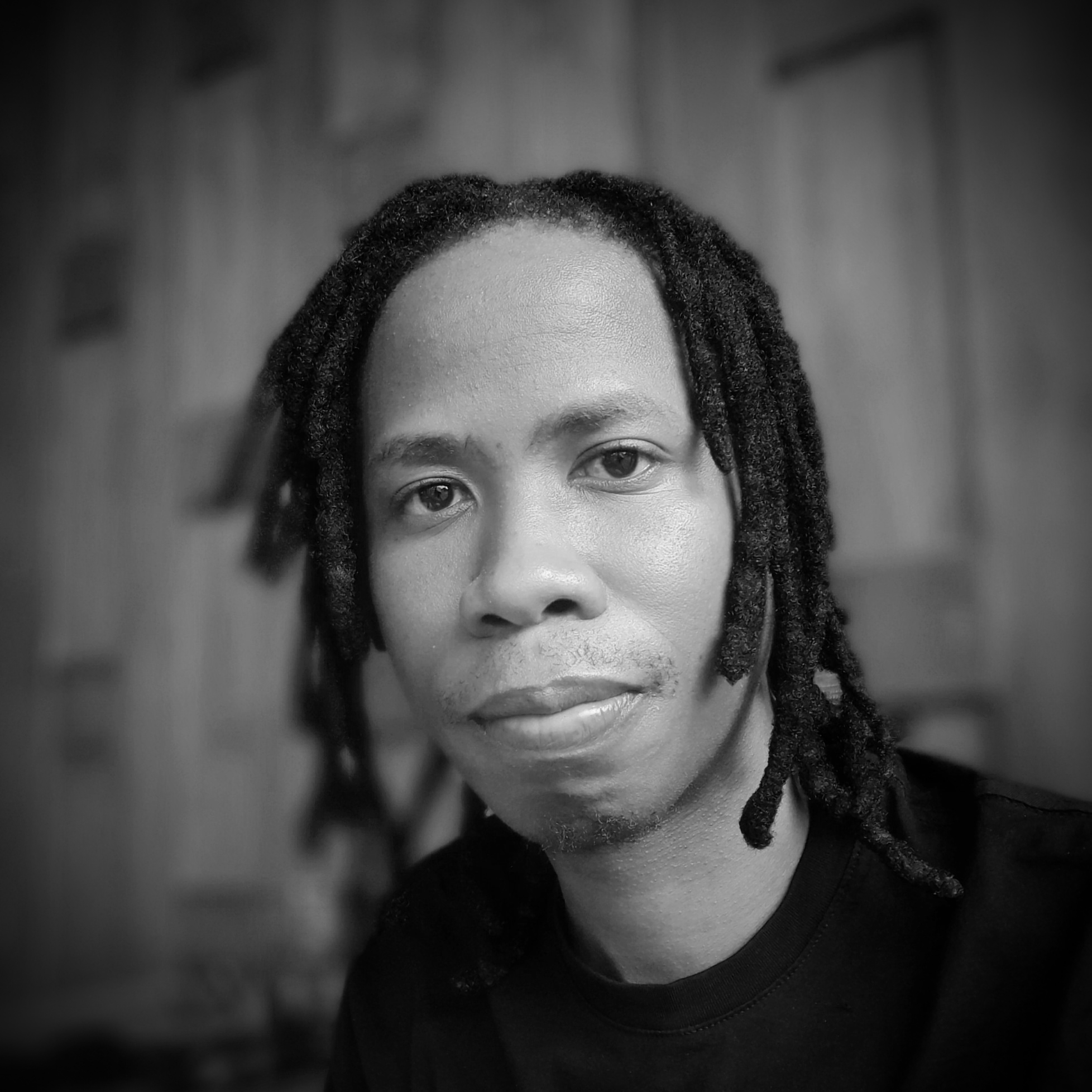
- Ntshanga in 2021
- Born: Masande Ngcali Ntshanga; 25 April 1986 (age 40); East London, Eastern Cape, South Africa
- Education: University of Cape Town
- Occupations: Novelist, short story writer, editor, poet, publisher and lecturer
- Writing career
- Genres: Literary fiction, experimental literature, science fiction, poetry
- Notable works: The Reactive, Triangulum
- Notable awards: PEN International New Voices Award, Betty Trask Award

Masande Ngcali Ntshanga (born 25 April 1986) is a South African novelist, short story writer, poet, editor and publisher. He is the author of two novels, The Reactive (2014), which was published in five territories and won a Betty Trask Award in 2018, and Triangulum (2019), for which he was nominated for a Nommo Award for Best Speculative Fiction Novel by an African. In 2020, Ntshanga released his third book, Native Life in the Third Millennium (2020), a collection of poetry and prose from his experimental press, Model See Media, which was also well received, with critics praising it for its themes and use of language. Ntshanga has delivered guest lectures at the Gordon Institute of Performing and Creative Arts in Cape Town, The Beeler Gallery in Columbus, The Columbus College of Arts and Design, The Centre for Creative Writing at the University of Cape Town, and The SAE Institute for Creative Media in Johannesburg. In 2020, he joined the Rhodes University MA in Creative Writing Program as a part-time lecturer and took over the literary journal, New Contrast, becoming its first black editor since the magazine was established in 1960. He now teaches at the Creative Writing Department at Wits University.

== Early life and education ==
Ntshanga was born in East London, in 1986, and spent his early childhood in Mdantsane and Bhisho, the capital of the former Ciskei. The Bantustan, which would later become part of the Eastern Cape, is a prominent feature in his fiction. In a 2020 interview with arts24, when asked about the prevalence of "machine logic" and "homelands" in his work, and whether or not this was autobiographical, Ntshanga said:

I think all writing is autobiographical. That it emerges from the same biographical detail: how the author perceives and arranges their world. It’s true, though, machine logic and the homelands do inform how I perceive and arrange mine. I’m still investigating the cause behind this, but I suspect it might have to do with the fact that the homelands themselves were technologies of conquest. That I was born into a malfunctioning machine.

In 1992, after the Bisho massacre, Ntshanga's family moved to King William's Town, where he attended an English medium school for the first time. Later, Ntshanga attended boarding school at St Gregory College, in Estcourt, where he became School Dux. In 2004, he matriculated from St Charles College in Pietermaritzburg, where he'd begun to write, placing his first story in the South African counterculture journal Laugh It Off at eighteen.

Ntshanga attended the University of Cape Town, where he continued to write and publish short stories in local literary journals. He completed a BA in Film and Media and an Honours degree in English Studies, before enrolling for the university's MA in Creative Writing program, working under the Mellon Mays Foundation. He was awarded an NRF Freestanding Masters Scholarship and in the program, Ntshanga was supervised by the South African novelist and academic, Imraan Coovadia.

== Writing ==
In his final year at the university, while working on his thesis, Ntshanga wrote the short story "Space", which won the inaugural PEN International New Voices Award in 2013. The judging panel included Sjón and Alain Mabanckou, amongst others, and the story was selected from a pool of PEN centres from across the world. Ntshanga flew to Reykjavík with the other shortlisted writers, José Pablo Salas and Claire Battershill, where he received the award and $1,000 USD on September 11, 2013, during the 79th PEN International Annual Congress, which was being held in the city as part of the Reykjavík International Literary Festival. The Executive Vice-President of PEN South Africa, Margie Orford, said, “Masande is a rare talent and an assured and lyrical writer. It is wonderful that a young South African won this prestigious award.” Ntshanga's short story drew the attention of Random House Struik, his South African publisher, and on returning home, he signed a book deal to develop his master's thesis into what became his debut novel, The Reactive.

== The Reactive (2014) ==
The Reactive was published in 2014 by Random House Struik. Following three Cape Town friends as they get high and sell antiretroviral drugs on the black market, the novel was positively received, praised for the beauty of its language despite its "harrowing" subject matter. In a review for Aerodrome, Eckard Smuts wrote: "From time to time a novel comes along that is so strange, yet so utterly fresh and compelling, that it feels tuned into a reality with which you are not yet familiar." In 2016, the novel was published in the United States by Two Dollar Radio, and to promote it, Ntshanga went on a North American tour, beginning at the Brooklyn Book Festival in New York City and concluding at City Lights Bookstore in San Francisco. Reviewing the US edition for Slate, Marian Ryan described the novel as what would happen "if Judd Apatow directed Jesus' Son and set it in Cape Town...The Reactive often teems with a beauty that seems to carry on in front of its glue-huffing wasters despite themselves." The book was translated into Italian and German, and in 2018, it was awarded a Betty Trask Award, becoming the first South African publication to receive the accolade.

== Triangulum (2019) ==
Triangulum was published in 2019 by Penguin Random House South Africa, Two Dollar Radio and Jacaranda Books. Mixing science-fiction with philosophy and South African history, the multi-layered, multi-genre novel, with references ranging from the Ciskei Bantustan to Stanisław Lem and The Legend of Zelda: Link's Awakening, was positively received. In a review for Booklist, Alexander Moran wrote: "The violent and fascinating history of South Africa―from colonialism to apartheid, and the recent struggles to come to terms with this past―serves as a rich backdrop for this unsettling, enrapturing novel that brings to mind Roberto Bolano’s 2666... a novel of incredible imagination that gradually unfurls into a wonderfully realized meditation on growing up, heritage, and the effects of technological progress on the world around us." In The Sunday Times, referring to the novel's setting of early 2000s South Africa, Kavish Chetty wrote: "Ntshanga exhumes a generational experience that might otherwise have disappeared altogether, leaving behind only our unreliable memories to provide testimony of another epoch in the life of this country." In 2020, Triangulum was shortlisted for a Nommo Award for Best Speculative Fiction Novel by an African.

== Native Life in the Third Millennium (2020) ==
Native Life in the Third Millennium was published in 2020 by Model See Media, also known as MDL SEE, Ntshanga's experimental press, which he established during the 2020 COVID-19 lockdown. It was released as a limited edition chapbook of 100 signed and numbered copies and distributed exclusively through independent South African bookstores. In the chapbook, a hybrid of interlinking poetry and prose, a philosopher, poet and programmer reflect on existence in millennial Africa. The book elaborates on Ntshanga's longstanding themes: addiction, mental illness, assimilation, technology, friendship, alienation and colonialism. In a Bubblegum Club interview with the author, Nkgopoleng Moloi wrote: "Sometimes classified as urban fiction, science fiction, political fiction and ‘coming of age’ stories, Ntshanga’s work is difficult to contain and is often a dance of binaries inching us closer towards the frigid and boundless voids of the human condition." For OkayAfrica, Rofhiwa Maneta wrote: "Ntshanga's swirling prose poses philosophical questions about what it means to be alive, the different mechanisms we use to keep the heaviness of being at a remove, and how the freight of our colonial past reaches into the future."

== Awards ==
- 2009: Fulbright Award
- 2012: Mellon Mays Foundation Creative Writing Scholarship
- 2013: PEN International New Voices Award
- 2014: Civitella Ranieri Foundation Writing Fellowship
- 2015: Africa Centre Artist in Residency Laureate Award
- 2016: Bundanon Artist-in-Residence Award
- 2018: Betty Trask Award

== Works ==
Novels

- The Reactive (2014)
- Triangulum (2019)

Poetry

- Native Life in the Third Millennium (2020)

Essays

- "Technologies of Conquest: On Writing the Dystopian through South Africa’s Past, Present and Possible Future(s)". The Johannesburg Review of Books. June 6, 2024.

Selected short stories

Title	Year	First published	Reprinted/collected	Notes
"Notes on USamson II"	2023	Ntshanga, Masande "Notes on USamson II" Lost Libraries, Burnt Archives Cape Town		
"Quiet Earth Philosophy"	2020	Ntshanga, Masande. "Quiet Earth Philosophy". MIT Technology Review. 123 (6): 80–87. Cambridge		
"Teachers"	2020	Ntshanga, Masande "Teachers'' menelique 1(3) Turin		
"The Sleeping Illness"	2019	Ntshanga, Masande "The Sleeping Illness" Los Angeles Review of Books Quarterly Journal No. 22. Los Angeles		
"Remedies"	2017	Ntshanga, Masande "Remedies" Berlin Quarterly 6: European Review of Culture 1 (6) Berlin		
"Space II"	2016	Ntshanga, Masande "Space II" The Daily Assortment of Astonishing Things: The Caine Prize for African Writing 2016 London		
"Calls"	2016	Ntshanga, Masande "Calls" n + 1 1 (25) New York City		
"The Reactive"	2016	Ntshanga, Masande "The Reactive" The White Review London		
"LT"	2015	Ntshanga, Masande "LT" VICE Toronto		
"Space"	2013	Ntshanga, Masande "Space" PEN South Africa Cape Town		
