= Justin Fox (disambiguation) =

Justin Fox (born 1964) is an American financial journalist.

Justin Fox may also refer to:

- Justin Fox (musician) (born 1979), lead vocalist for the American band Dishwalla
- Justin D. Fox (born 1967), South African author, photojournalist, lecturer and editor
- Justin Fox (DOGE employee), American businessman and employee of the Department of Government Efficiency (DOGE)

== See also ==
- Justin Foxton (1849–1916), Australian politician, barrister and soldier
