= Estoril Books =

Bookseller chain in South Africa

Estoril Books is a small bookselling chain in Johannesburg. This family-owned business, when compared to the estimated 1,600 bookshops in South Africa, has exerted a disproportionate influence on South African authors. Today Estoril Bookshops are located in suburban malls. But Estoril Books has its roots in Hillbrow where this bookstore contributed to a strong literary heritage in the city. The first Estoril bookshop was established in 1963 on Pretoria street, next to Checkers.

Under Apartheid, it was the Estoril bookstore that avoided the censor's attention and earned the reputation as a counter-culture haven, where well- known authors, like Mark Gevisser could access a range of international magazines, three months after they were published. At that time, the Estoril Hillbrow bookshop acted as a literary port of entry, for European immigrants to access and read books. This echoes another literary genre, the "Jim comes to Jo’burg novels”, where Johannesburg is once seen as a place of action and opportunity, but then becomes a place of disillusionment and despair where the rural protagonists eek out a living in the urban metropolis.
