= The Restless Supermarket =

2001 novel by Ivan Vladislavić

- Author: Ivan Vladislavic
- Language: English
- Genre: Novel
- Publisher: David Philip Publishers
- Publication date: 2001
- Publication place: South Africa
- Media type: Print (Hardback & Paperback)

The Restless Supermarket is a novel by Croatian-South African author Ivan Vladislavic. It tracks the changes in Hillbrow, Johannesburg, during the 1990s, through the eyes of a grumpy, retired proof-reader who spends his life in a café. It was published by David Philip Publishers in Cape Town in 2001 and was recently reissued. The book was published again in 2014 by publishing house 'And Other Stories.'

== Critical reception ==
The novel won the Sunday Times CNA Literary Awards in 2002.

A reviewer for The Independent, after describing it as "a masterpiece of voice", said, "A work of such immense imaginativeness, of such extraordinarily serious playfulness, comes along very rarely."
