= The Republic of Gupta =

2017 book by Pieter-Louis Myburgh

The Republic of Gupta: A Story of State Capture
- Author: Pieter-Louis Myburgh
- Language: English
- Subject: Gupta family, Politics of South Africa
- Published: Cape Town
- Publisher: Penguin Books
- Publication date: April 2017
- Publication place: South Africa
- ISBN: 978-1-77609-089-1 (Paperback)

The Republic of Gupta: A Story of State Capture is a 2017 book by South African investigative journalist Pieter-Louis Myburgh.

== Background and synopsis ==
The Republic of Gupta investigates the business activities of the Gupta family and how they came to hold a position of such power and influence over the President of South Africa, Jacob Zuma. It is an exposé of the many controversial business activities of the Gupta family from cricket to computers to newspapers and television. The book explores their conflict with Public Protector Thuli Madonsela and with the Finance Minister Pravin Gordhan which led to his dismissal by Zuma. The book also investigates the other close links between the Gupta family and others within South African politics and society.

== Reception ==
In The Sunday Times Graeme Hosken praises the book as "fascinating". Hosken writes that Myburgh "discloses their thirst for control and wealth through outrageous manipulation".
