= A Human Being Died That Night =

Book by Pumla Gobodo-Madikizela

- Author: Pumla Gobodo-Madikizela
- Published: 2003 (David Philip Cape Town)
- Publication place: South Africa
- Awards: Alan Paton Award, 2004
- ISBN: 978-0618211890

A Human Being Died That Night is a 2003 book by Pumla Gobodo-Madikizela.

The book is Gobodo-Madikizela's account of her interviews with state-sanctioned mass murderer Eugene De Kock from the time of apartheid in South Africa. These interviews are mixed in with stories of victims and criminals on both sides of the racial barrier with whom she met during her time as a member of the Human Rights Violations Committee, a part of South Africa's Truth and Reconciliation Commission. The book focuses on her growing empathy for those pushed by a cruel system into losing their morality and becoming killers (killers from all races) and her attempt to understand what causes someone to be able to commit crimes against humanity, and is considered an examination of the broader impact of the Truth Commission process. The book is 197 pages, separated into chapters.

The book won the Alan Paton Award in 2004.

== Pumla Gobodo-Madikizela ==
Pumla Gobodo-Madikizela is the author of the book A Human Being Died That Night. She was also a psychologist on the Truth and Reconciliation Commission (South Africa). She has received an honorary degree of theology from the Friedrich-Schiller University Jena in Germany due to her work in post-apartheid South Africa. She has gone on to give speeches discussing her book, time on the TRC, and interviewing de Kock. She speaks about the idea of forgiveness, and why people such as de Kock, should be forgiven in her eyes. She also discusses her time on the Truth and Reconciliation Commission as a psychologist, where she first met de Kock when he was on trial. During a speech for C-SPAN, she discusses the stories of different victims of apartheid crimes such as de Kock's along with her personal experience with him. Gobodo-Madikizela interviewed de Kock multiple times at Pretoria Central Prison where he was being held. In the book, she wrote about the anxiety and fear she felt going into the interviews, due to the crimes he had committed and the evil reputation he had. By the end of the book, she said she was surprised at how human and less evil de Kock was, and ultimately forgives him and urges others to forgive as well.

== Eugene De Kock ==
Eugene De Kock was born in the Western Cape Province of South Africa in 1949. He became involved in the South African police force, and in 1983 he earned the title of Commander in the Vlakplaas Unit. He took part in the South African Truth and Reconciliation Commission (South Africa) where he confessed to the murders of hundreds of people. He was then sentenced to 212 years plus two life sentences in 1996; he stayed in prison until 2016 when he was released on parole. De Kock was given the nickname Prime Evil. This nickname was given to him by South African citizens, most of whom were victims and/or families of victims of his crimes. In the book, Gobodo-Madikizela mentions this nickname making her nervous going into the interviews, as she was afraid he would be truly evil as people depicted him to be.

== The Truth and Reconciliation Commission (South Africa) ==
The Truth and Reconciliation Commission (TRC) in South Africa began in 1995 after the fall of apartheid. The premise was to have the full truth about politically charged crimes committed during apartheid be told, but to then grant most of the criminal amnesty if they did tell the truth. Those leading the TRC were, Desmond Tutu, chairman, and Alex Boraine, deputy chairman. The TRC had 22,000 statements from victims, 7,000 amnesty applications, 2,500 amnesty hearings, and 1,500 amnesties were granted.

== Pretoria Central Prison ==
Pretoria Central Prison is located in Pretoria, South Africa. It contains an all-male prison, in which de Kock was held. It is a large complex including multiple different buildings and areas. De Kock was held in the main part, where all of the sentenced prisoners were held, C-Max. There is also a female ward on site, but they are kept separate from the males. The prison can hold up to 8,000 prisoners and has a staff of 2,100 currently under the control of Area Commissioner, Tlabo Thokolo. The name has now changed to Kgosi Mampuru II Correctional Centre, although it is still often referred to as Pretoria Central Prison.

== Stage adaptation ==
A play, with the same title, was written in 2013 by Nicholas Wright, and produced at the Fugard Theatre in Cape Town, the Market Theatre in Johannesburg, and the Hampstead Theatre in London. The play was shown in both Cape Town and Johannesburg South Africa. The Johannesburg audience was majority (60%) black and majority young. The Cape Town audience was majority (85%) white. It was also presented to audiences of school children in order to educate them on the history of apartheid and the Truth and Reconciliation Commission.

== Reviews and reception ==
The book, for the most part, was highly acclaimed, with reviews praising Gobodo-Madikizela's writing along with her courage to interview de Kock.
