= Joseph Silver =

Polish sex trafficker

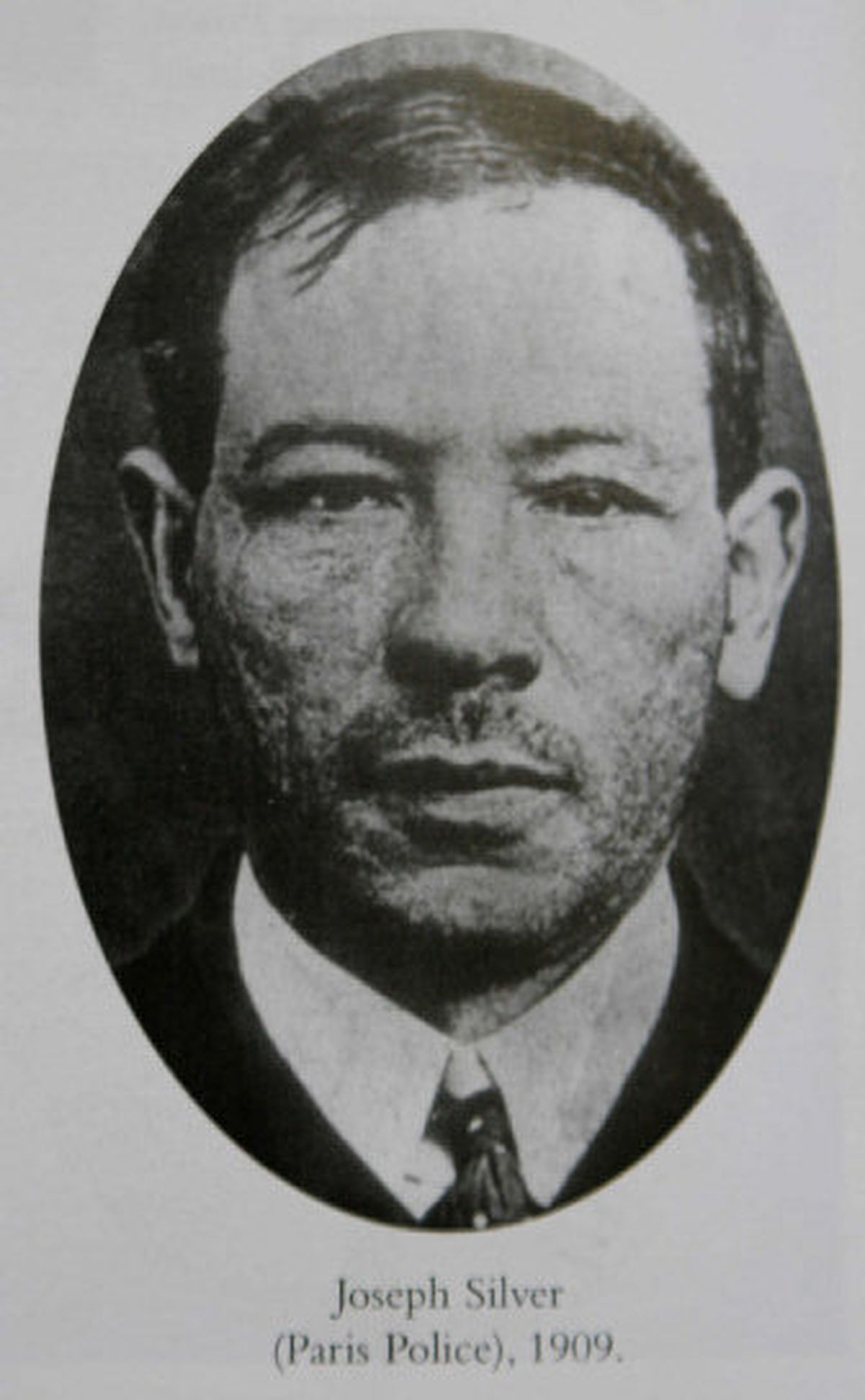
- Silver in 1909
- Born: Józef Lis; 1868; Kielce, Congress Poland, Russian Empire
- Died: 1918 (aged 49–50); Jarosław, Galicia, Austria-Hungary
- Cause of death: Execution by firing squad
- Occupations: Pimp; Criminal; Businessman
- Known for: Jack the Ripper suspect
- Spouse(s): Hannah Opticer; Hannah Vygenbaum; Rachel Laskin

Joseph Silver (born Józef Lis; 1868–1918) was a Polish gangster active in the late 19th century and early 20th century. A career criminal, Silver was involved in organized crime, specifically human trafficking and prostitution rings throughout Europe, the Americas and Southern Africa, oftentimes supported by corrupt law enforcement, becoming known as the "King of Pimps".

== Early life ==
=== Background ===
Silver's family, on both his paternal and maternal side, were Jewish tobacco merchants and hailed from Działoszyce and Opatów respectively, in what is now Świętokrzyskie Voivodeship. His father Anzelm Lis was born in 1849 in Chmielnik while his mother Hanna Kweksylber was born in 1850 in Staszów. They separately moved to Kielce in 1863, married in 1866 and lived primarily in a tenement on Hipoteczna Street (now Wolności Square). Silver was born in 1868 as the third of nine children (five girls and four boys) and raised with Yiddish as the household language.

The marriage of Silver's parents was marked by dysfunction. Hanna had several extra-marital affairs, resulting in the birth of Silver's younger brother Jacob in 1873, who was knowingly raised as Anzelm's son. Anzelm, a tailor by trade, was active in petty crime, being involved in the smuggling of alcohol and tobacco, and is known to have acted in at least one robbery on a fur store, but despite being identified, he was released without punishment after the arrest. The couple divorced in 1892, but they still shared living space, eventually reconciling in 1912. South African historian Charles van Onselen posits that Silver's misogyny was influenced by his mother's infidelities.

=== Name ===
His original Polish name "Lis" means "Fox". His alias "Silver", was a reference to his mother, whose maiden name was Kweksylber, derived from the German surname Quecksilber, both meaning Quicksilver. He was also known as Joe Liss, Joe Eligmann, James Smith, Joseph Schmidt, José Silva (also Silves), J. Cosman, Charlie Silver, Charles Greenbaum, Abraham Ramer and Ludwig.

== Career ==
At age 15, Silver, following the footsteps of several cousins, left Poland, obtained a passport on 14 August 1884, and entered the United Kingdom sometime in 1885, beginning his criminal career in the East End of London, where he also started taking on numerous aliases and began cooperating with corrupt police officers for his personal gain, until leaving for the United States in 1889. In New York City, he served two years at Sing Sing prison for a Lower East Side burglary in which he stole $1.50 (equivalent to $54 in 2025) and a silk shawl. Silver was released on 12 October 1891 and according to his own testimony, supported by police records, he ended up working as a "special agent" for NYC's Society for the Prevention of Crime. Between 1893 and 1894, Silver was involved in criminal activity in Pittsburgh and in 1895, Silver fled New York for London, where he went on to run a brothel near Waterloo station. Shortly after, he was tried for rape, but acquitted on a technicality before serving a sentence in HM Prison Pentonville and HM Prison Wormwood Scrubs for petty larceny. While in London, Silver was recorded as marrying three times: Hannah Opticer, Hannah Vygenbaum, a.k.a. Annie Alford, and Rachel Laskin a.k.a. Lizzie Silver, all of them fellow Polish Jews from Opatów, his mother's ancestral home, whom he had forced into prostitution beforehand. Silver was known to mistreat his wives, as well as the prostitutes and sex slaves that labored in his brothels, regularly subjecting them to sexual assaults. Contemporary accounts, as well as three of the four known photographs that exist of Silver which showed that his face was riddled with deep pockmarks, indicated that he contracted syphilis in the 1890s.

In 1898, Silver, along with his third wife Rachel Laskin, appeared in the South African Republic. In Johannesburg, he operated a network of cafes, cigar shops and police-protected brothels, with the sex workers at the latter being primarily composed of Jewish women that were trafficked from parts of Eastern Europe, steadily expanding his criminal reach within the country, including to the cities of Kimberley, Cape Town, and Bloemfontein. He based his activities out of an establishment called the American Club, located on Sauer Street, which was described as housing "a trade union of pimps in coded, telegraphic and postal communication". During his time in South Africa, Silver frequently engaged in litigation and wrote vehement letters to newspapers who reported on his racketeering. The majority of his aliases appear to date from his period in South Africa. Silver's brutality was noted to escalate, with him once punishing a disobedient prostitute by subduing her with chloroform and threatening to pour irritating blue vitriol into her vagina and in 1898, he intimidated Lillie Bloom, a prostitute who had threatened to expose Silver's abuse to the authorities, by telling her in front of police that he would "slit [her] belly open" in Yiddish, which the officers did not understand.

Silver continued to cooperate with police to maintain his connections and get rid of competitors, often providing anonymous testimony for criminal trials regarding burglary or theft. Nevertheless, Silver was briefly imprisoned in Old Fort Prison, where he raped a Zulu inmate, an act which, according to van Onselen, led to the coinage of the derorgatory term "impimpi" as a police informer in South African English slang, and "AmaSilva" as a prison term for a procurer, specifically one who provides young white males as sex partners, to imprisoned members of the Ninevites. In 1905, Silver left for German South West Africa, setting up illegal brothels in Swakopmund and Windhoek, for which he was convicted in 1906 and sentenced to three years imprisonment, of which he served two. Afterwards, he left the continent for Europe again, leaving behind his wife, who was subsequently admitted to a mental asylum in Potchefstroom, where she died in 1945.

After arriving in Neumünster, Silver headed for Paris, where his mugshot was taken by French authorities in 1909. For a year, he ran prostitution rings in Antwerp, Brussels, Liège, and Aachen. Silver moved to Balvanera, Buenos Aires in 1910 and conducted human trafficking operations for his brothels in Europe within neighboring Chile, largely in the area between Santiago and Valparaíso, in addition to gun-running, while working as a police officer. Silver's last official residence was in Rio de Janeiro, where he lived between 1914 and 1916, although he was known to occasional stay in New York City and London.

In 1917, during the late stage of World War I, while Silver was in Europe, he was recruited by the newly formed Russian government to act as a spy in Austria-Hungary. Silver was caught in Austrian Galicia and held in a prison in Jarosław, where he was shot for espionage in 1918. Silver's execution is not documented, but it is certain that it took place. After being taken on a short trip to Jaroslaw to Przemyśl, he was never heard from again. On 1 October 1918, an officer in Jarosław noted that the case had been brought to a conclusion.

== Jack the Ripper suspect ==
In 2007, Charles van Onselen claimed in the book The Fox and The Flies: The World of Joseph Silver, Racketeer and Psychopath that Silver was the infamous Jack the Ripper serial killer in the Whitechapel murders in 1888, citing their shared "pathological misogyny" and apparent desire "to exploit and humiliate" prostitutes inspired by Ezekiel 23:25, also alleging that Silver was motivated by a twisted interpretation of Tevilah instead involving the bathing in the blood of prostitutes, a claim that has been characterized as antisemitic blood libel. Building on the assertion, crime authors connected him to Lewis Lis, a shopkeeper who owned a business in Plumber's Row near Whitechapel, and Joseph Isaacs, a potential suspect in the murder of Mary Jane Kelly, claiming that Isaacs was another one of Silver's aliases, both based largely around their shared names. Critics note, among other things, that van Onselen provides no evidence that Silver was in London when the murders took place and that the accusation is based entirely upon speculation. Van Onselen has responded that the number of circumstances involved should make Silver a suspect. He would have been 20 at the time, much younger than contemporary suspect descriptions of Jack the Ripper.

== See also ==
- List of Jack the Ripper suspects
