= Bhisho =

Capital of the Eastern Cape, South Africa

Bhisho Bisho
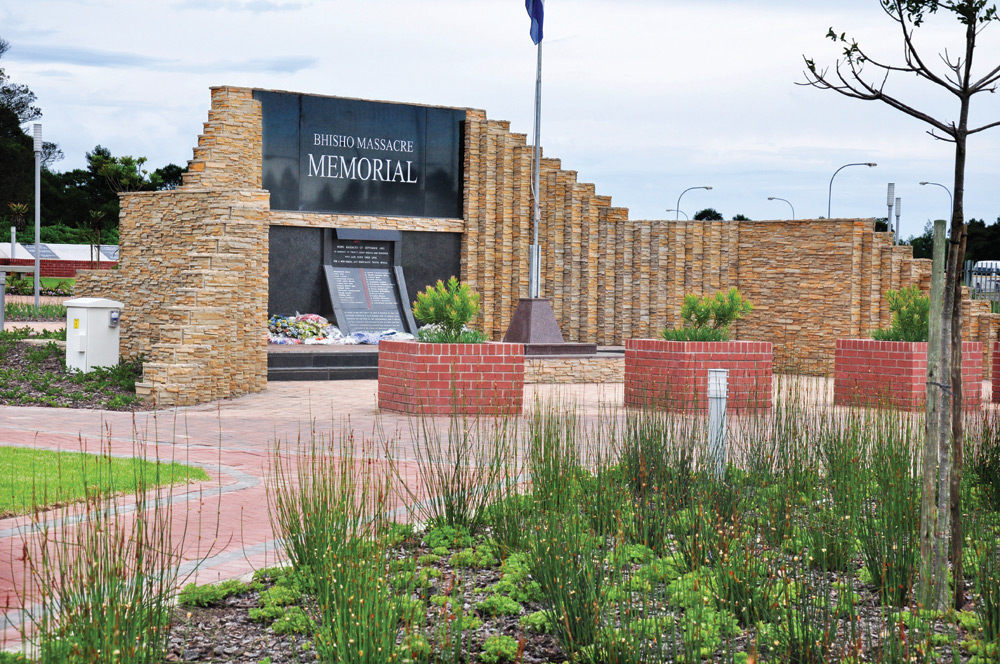
- Bisho Massacre Memorial Site

- Location in Eastern Cape, South Africa Bhisho (South Africa) Bhisho (Africa)
- Coordinates: 32°50′58″S 27°26′17″E
- Country: South Africa
- Province: Eastern Cape
- Municipality: Buffalo City

Area
  - Total: 8.08 km^{2} (3.12 sq mi)
- Elevation: 435 m (1,427 ft)

Population (2011)
  - Total: 11,192
  - Density: 1,390/km^{2} (3,590/sq mi)

Racial makeup (2011)
  - Black African: 98.3%
  - Coloured: 1.0%
  - Indian/Asian: 0.2%
  - White: 0.2%
  - Other: 0.2%

First languages (2011)
  - Xhosa: 92.0%
  - English: 4.0%
  - Other: 4.1%
- Time zone: UTC+2 (SAST)
- Postal code (street): 5605
- PO box: 5605
- Area code: 040

Bhisho, formerly Bisho, is the capital of the Eastern Cape province of South Africa. The Office of the Premier, Provincial Legislature and many other government departments are headquartered in the town. The town, three kilometres from Qonce and 70 kilometres from East London, is also part of Buffalo City.

== History ==
Bhisho derives its name from the Xhosa word for buffalo, which is also the name of the river (Buffalo River) that runs near this town. Bhisho was named after the song by Ben Tyazashe, who wrote of his longing for his home, Bisho, his name for King William's Town. However, it has also been claimed that the name was invented by Ciskei leader Lennox Sebe, after his unsuccessful bid to incorporate King William's Town into Ciskei, as Qonce (the Xhosa version of the Khoikhoi name for the Buffalo River; it means “buffalo”) was already used as the native name for King William's Town.

=== Capital of Ciskei ===
When the bantustan of Ciskei was nominally granted independence in 1981, although this was never recognised outside South Africa, Bisho served as its capital city. During the early 1980s under the leadership of Lennox Sebe, Bisho underwent a period of intense development.

Its location six kilometres north of King William's Town on the main road linking the Cape to the Transkei and Natal has been described as the result of the Ciskei government wanting to place an "economic stranglehold" upon the white community of King William's Town who united across political lines against incorporation into the homeland, in the face of a 1979 recommendation by the South African government.

In 1983 Bisho signed a sister-city agreement with the settlement of Ariel in the Israeli-occupied West Bank. This saw the construction of two hospitals (one on a floodplain) including Bisho Hospital and up to 10 firms around the capital by Israeli entrepreneurs and technicians. In 1985, when Bisho ended its relationship with the West Bank, there were 200 Israelis in the Ciskei.

=== Bisho Massacre ===
On 7 September 1992, Bisho became the scene of what is known as the Bisho massacre, when about 80–100,000 people marched on Bisho calling for the dismantling of Ciskei, which still maintained a measure of independence, and removal of the homeland's leader Brigadier Oupa Gqozo. The Ciskei Defence Force opened fire, shooting dead 28 or 29 people, and wounding 100. The massacre came at a critical time when negotiations towards democracy were underway.

=== Post-Apartheid Era ===
Bisho was reincorporated into South Africa on 12 August 1994, following the first democratic elections in the country in April the same year. In October 1994, the then Eastern Cape Premier Raymond Mhlaba announced that Bisho had been selected as the capital city of the Eastern Cape due to its infrastructure, accessibility to major roads and space for further development.

The department of Arts and Culture published a correction of spelling of Bisho to Bhisho in their government notice No. 830 of Gazette No. 26552 on 16 July 2004.

== Bhisho today ==
Bhisho's major structures include the Eastern Cape government offices (including office of the Premier), a branch of the University of Fort Hare, Bhisho Hospital, Bisho massacre Memorial, Bhisho Stadium and an SABC radio station known as trufm. Bhisho is dependent on the nearby Qonce (formerly King William's Town) and East London. The majority of the town's population who are employed are public service workers.

== Climate ==
Köppen-Geiger climate classification system classifies Bhisho's climate as cool semi-arid (BSk), although it borders closely on both a hot semi-arid climate (BSh) and a humid subtropical climate (Cfa).

Climate data for Bhisho
Month	Jan	Feb	Mar	Apr	May	Jun	Jul	Aug	Sep	Oct	Nov	Dec	Year
Mean daily maximum °C (°F)	26.4 (79.5)	26.6 (79.9)	25.5 (77.9)	23.9 (75.0)	22.1 (71.8)	20.4 (68.7)	20.0 (68.0)	20.9 (69.6)	21.7 (71.1)	22.3 (72.1)	23.5 (74.3)	25.3 (77.5)	23.2 (73.8)
Daily mean °C (°F)	21.1 (70.0)	21.3 (70.3)	20.3 (68.5)	18.2 (64.8)	15.8 (60.4)	13.9 (57.0)	13.4 (56.1)	14.2 (57.6)	15.4 (59.7)	16.7 (62.1)	18.1 (64.6)	19.8 (67.6)	17.4 (63.2)
Mean daily minimum °C (°F)	15.8 (60.4)	16.1 (61.0)	15.1 (59.2)	12.5 (54.5)	9.6 (49.3)	7.4 (45.3)	6.9 (44.4)	7.5 (45.5)	9.2 (48.6)	11.2 (52.2)	12.8 (55.0)	14.4 (57.9)	11.5 (52.8)
Average rainfall mm (inches)	65 (2.6)	71 (2.8)	72 (2.8)	43 (1.7)	22 (0.9)	19 (0.7)	17 (0.7)	28 (1.1)	47 (1.9)	80 (3.1)	76 (3.0)	70 (2.8)	610 (24.1)
Source: Climate-Data.org

== Notable people ==
- Ma Nala (born 1994) - singer-songwriter
- Masande Ntshanga (born 1986) - novelist
