= Pumla Gobodo-Madikizela =

South African academic (born 1955)

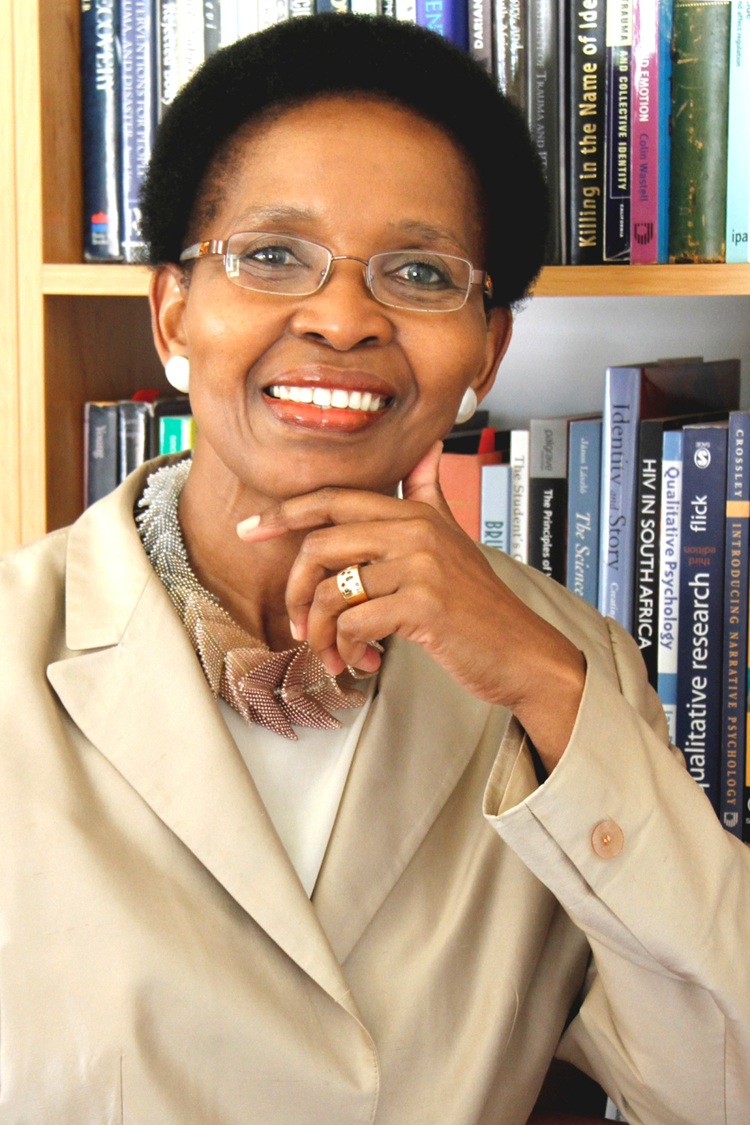
- Pumla Gobodo-Madikizela in 2011
- Born: Pumla Phillipa Gobodo; 15 February 1955 (age 71); Langa, Cape Town, Western Cape, South Africa
- Awards: Alan Paton Award Official website

Academic work
- Main interests: Traumatic Memories, Post-conflict reconciliation, empathy, forgiveness, psychoanalysis and Intersubjectivity
- Notable ideas: Empathic Repair; Making Public Spaces Intimate

Pumla Gobodo-Madikizela (born 15 February 1955) is the Research Chair in Studies in Historical Trauma and Transformation at Stellenbosch University in South Africa. She graduated from Fort Hare University with a bachelor's degree and an Honours degree in psychology. She obtained her master's degree in Clinical Psychology at Rhodes University. She received her PhD in psychology from the University of Cape Town. Her doctoral thesis, entitled "Legacies of violence: An in-depth analysis of two case studies based on interviews with perpetrators of a 'necklace' murder and with Eugene de Kock", offers a perspective that integrates psychoanalytic and social psychological concepts to understand extreme forms of violence committed during the apartheid era. Her main interests are traumatic memories in the aftermath of political conflict, post-conflict reconciliation, empathy, forgiveness, psychoanalysis and intersubjectivity. She served on the Truth and Reconciliation Commission (TRC). She currently works at the University of the Free State in Bloemfontein as a senior research professor.

== Life and career ==
=== Early life ===
Gobodo-Madikizela was born in Langa Township, the oldest residential area for Black Africans in Cape Town. The eldest daughter of William Wilberforce Tukela and Nobantu Herman-Gilda Gobodo, she was given the names Pumla Phillipa by her parents. Influenced by the Black Consciousness Movement, which she joined during her high school days, she dropped her English middle name, and formalised the name change later in her adulthood. Gobodo-Madikizela attended Inanda Seminary, a boarding school for girls near Durban, which was founded and run by the American Board of Missions, and at the time the only private school for black girls in South Africa. She credits her parents with having taught her a deep sense of caring for others, integrity and a strong work ethic. She described her early childhood as "happy, despite apartheid." Yet she also talks about how she discovered the beauty of Cape Town only in her adulthood when she visited the city after the historic welcoming of Nelson Mandela from Pollsmoor Prison in February 1990, and relocating to Cape Town to study for her PhD at the University of Cape Town in 1991.

In a poignant statement, that illustrates how the Apartheid government's Group Areas Act went beyond geographic separation of racial groups according to race-defined residential areas, Gobodo-Madikizela said, "Although Table Mountain is visible from Langa Township, I never saw this iconic mountain during my childhood. It was a world I did not belong to, and therefore a world whose beauty I could not experience until much later in life." She experienced the feeling of being a "second-class citizen" in her country of birth most strongly during her first trip to the United States in 1989, when she spent a few months as a research fellow affiliated with the Psychology Department at the University of Southern California in Los Angeles. She encountered many Americans who eagerly spoke about the beautiful landscape of a city about which she knew very little.

=== School and university years ===
Like most Black South Africans of her generation who were active in student politics, both her high-school and university years were interrupted by expulsions, student protests and closure of universities. After expulsion from Inanda Seminary School (for refusing to divulge the names of fellow strike organisers without the principal's assurance that divulging the names would not lead to expulsion of the students) her parents sent her to a co-ed school, Shawbury High School (Winnie Madikizela-Mandela graduated from the same high school). At this school, Gobodo-Madikizela directed her activist energy to drama. She directed and acted in her first play, A Man for All Seasons, adapted from a book by Robert Bolt based on the story of Sir Thomas More. She worked with an all-female student cast, who collaborated and assembled "costumes" for the play, and with the help of the school principal raised funds to travel to perform the play at other schools, including a school in the South Coast of KwaZulu-Natal.

Throughout her primary and high school education, her academic strength was in the sciences and mathematics, and she obtained distinctions and prizes for mathematics at Inanda Seminary. In her first year at Fort Hare University, she registered for a BSc degree, taking a combination of courses (called "pre-med" at the time) that would allow her to enter into medical school. Her parents wanted her to become a medical doctor, however, an incident in the Zoology laboratory led to her abandoning the idea of a medical degree. She received her BA degree from Fort Hare University in 1977, and completed her Honours in Psychology in 1979. She later went on to train as clinical psychologists at Rhodes University, where she received a master's degree in Clinical Psychology in 1984. She worked for a few years at the Psychiatric Clinic in Mtata before taking up a lectureship position in psychology at the university now known as Walter Sisulu Metropolitan University. In this period, she also ran a part-time clinical practice, married Msimang Madikizela (of the Madikizela clan from the rural village Mbongweni, Bizana), and gave birth to her son and only child. She divorced in 1987.

=== Professional life ===
She worked with Martin Luitingh, who was a South African advocate involved in human rights work. She was invited to join Martin Luitingh's team as a defence expert witness in a "Necklace murder" trial. Field research deepened her interest in the psychological aftermath of mass trauma and violence. In 1991, Gobodo-Madikizela started a PhD at the University of Cape Town on "Necklace murders" committed in the context of crowd violence. In 1994–1995, she was at Harvard University when she was invited to join the Truth and Reconciliation Commission of South Africa (TRC). She served on the Human Rights Violations Committee until May 1998. In 1998, she returned to Harvard University to take up a fellowship at the Radcliffe Institute for Advanced Study. She completed her doctoral dissertation in November 1999 and graduated at the University of Cape Town in June 2000. She remained in Cambridge for two more years, with affiliations at Harvard's Carr Centre for Human Rights Policy at the Kennedy School, and the Center for Ethics at Harvard Divinity School respectively. In this period, she gave lectures and started writing on what she referred to as the "new phenomenon" she witnessed while serving on the TRC's Human Rights Violations Committee – forgiveness of the unforgivable.

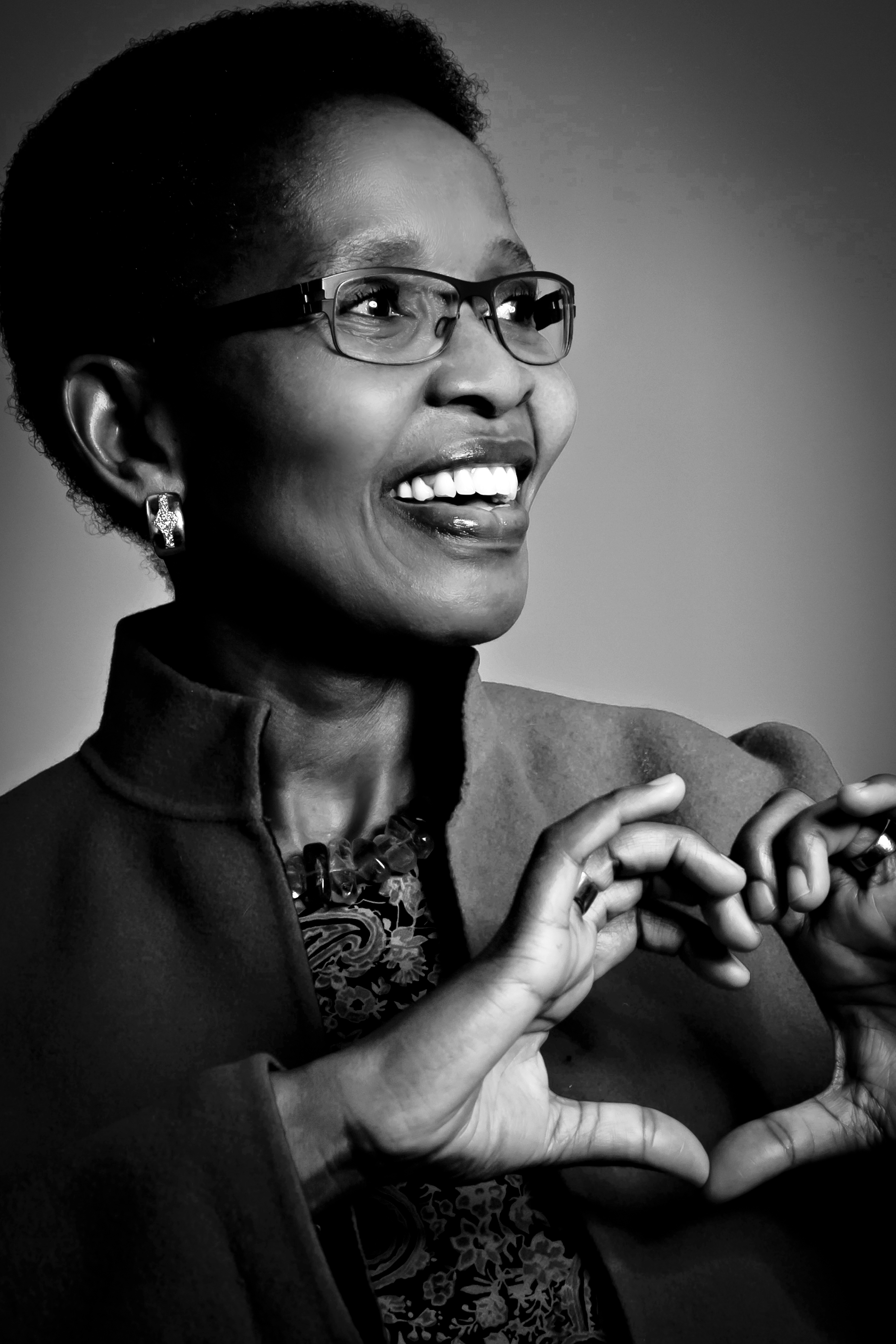
Pumla Gobodo-Madikizela in 2012

=== Research on forgiveness ===
Gobodo-Madikizela has meditated on the concepts central to the phenomenon of forgiveness and developed a body of work revolving around the process of reconciliation. She describes her current research as the phenomenological study of empathy and what being moved to offer forgiveness entails.

In her award-winning book, A Human Being Died That Night: A South African Story of Forgiveness, Gobodo-Madikizela argues that the TRC overturns Hannah Arendt's notion of acts that are unforgivable and unpunishable, and for which no apology can be made. She claims that, at South Africa's TRC, precisely the opposite occurred – apology and forgiveness for what Arendt referred to as "radical evil." In both academic and popular settings she has examined the concepts that underlie the process of forgiving in the aftermath of historical trauma, and the potential for dialogue, remorse and forgiveness to break intergenerational cycles of repetition.

=== Professorship in University of Cape Town ===
Gobodo-Madikizela was appointed Associate professor of Psychology at the University of Cape Town in 2003. She became a full professor at the same university in 2010. Her inaugural lecture, entitled "The 'Face of the Other': Human Dialogue at Solms Delta and the Meaning of Moral Imagination", focused on the 320-year-old Solms Delta estate in Franschhoek, home to the "Museum van de Caab" - a museum of the farm's slave heritage from pre-colonial times. In her address, Gobodo-Madikizela used Solms' story as a representative story for recognizing 'the other' in dialogue, and to demonstrate the importance of memory and memorialisation in the aftermath of historical trauma.

=== Senior Research Professor at University of the Free State ===
In 2012, she resigned from the University of Cape Town to take up a position as Senior Research Professor for trauma, forgiveness and reconciliation at the University of the Free State.

=== Research Chair in Studies in Historical Trauma and Transformation at Stellenbosch University ===
In 2017, Professor Gobodo-Madikizela was appointed to the post of Research Chair in Studies in Historical Trauma and Transformation at Stellenbosch University in the Western Cape. She describes her work as focusing mainly on two strands of research. The first is exploring ways in which the impact of the dehumanising experiences of oppression and violent abuse continues to play out in the next generation in the aftermath of historical trauma. The second research area expands on her earlier work on remorse and forgiveness and probes the role of empathy more deeply by engaging a perspective that makes transparent the interconnected relationship among empathy, Ubuntu and the embodied African phenomenon of inimba. She currently sits on the International Advisory Board of The Senator George J. Mitchell Institute For Global Peace, Security And Justice at Queen's University Belfast.

=== Visiting Professor at University of Uppsala, Sweden ===
From August to December 2015, she was a guest professor at Uppsala university in Sweden. She holds the Claude Ake Visiting Chair, which is co-financed by the Nordic Africa Institute and the Department of Peace and Conflict Research at Uppsala University.

== Writings ==
Pumla Godobo-Madikizela has authored and edited a number of books, including award-winning A Human Being Died That Night.

- A Human Being Died that Night: A South African Story of Forgiveness (2003)
- Narrating Our Healing: Perspectives on Working through Trauma (2008, co-author with Chris van der Merwe)
- Memory, Narrative and Forgiveness: Perspectives on the Unfinished Journeys of the Past (2009, co-editor with Chris van der Merwe)

Her critically acclaimed book A Human Being Died that Night received several awards, including the Alan Paton Award (sometimes referred to as "the Pulitzer" of non-fiction writing in South Africa), and the Christopher Award in the United States. The theatre adaptation of the book premiered at the Hampstead Theatre in London in May 2013.

== Honours ==
- Carnegie Resident Scholars Fellowship, University of the Witwatersrand, 2011.
- Social Change Award. Awarded by Rhodes University for "contribution made by leading psychologists to social change in South Africa," September 2010.
- Eleanor Roosevelt Medal, 2007
- Honoured among "100 People who made a difference" in Permanent Exhibit of Hall of Heroes in the National Underground Railroad Freedom Centre in Cincinnati, 2005.
- The Alan Paton Book Award for A Human Being Died That Night: A Story of Forgiveness, 2004.
- The Christopher Award in the United States for A Human Being Died That Night, 2003.
- A Human Being Died That Night nominated for Best Book of the Year by the National Book Critics Circle, 2004.
- Honorary Doctor of Law awarded by Holy Cross College, May 2002.
- The Dr Jean Mayer Global Citizenship Award by Education for Public Inquiry and International Citizenship (EPIIC), Tufts University, March, 2001.
- Peace Fellowship, Radcliffe Institute for Advanced Research, Harvard University, 1998–99.
- Distinguished Old Rhodian Award in 2017
- In 2019 Rhodes University in Grahamstown announced it would award Gobodo-Madikizela an honorary doctorate in laws (LLD, hc)
- She was awarded the 2024 Templeton Prize Laureate by John Templeton Foundation.
