= Tim Couzens =

- Born: 13 February 1944; Durban, South Africa
- Died: 26 October 2016 (aged 72)
- Education: Durban High School; Rhodes University; University of the Witwatersrand
- Occupations: Writer, literary and social historian
- Writing career
- Language: English

Tim Couzens (1944–2016) was a South African literary and social historian, and travel writer. He was educated at Durban High School, Rhodes University, and the University of the Witwatersrand. He won a number of awards for his works, and was employed in the Graduate School for Humanities and Social Sciences at the University of the Witwatersrand, Johannesburg.

Couzens authored 16 distinct works and was also involved in the publication of Nelson Mandela's "Conversations With Myself".

In mid October 2016 Couzens suffered a severe head injury from a fall causing a brain haemorrhage. He fell into a coma and then died on October 26.

== Publications ==
- The Return of the Amasi Bird: Black South African Poetry 1891-1981 (Ravan Press, 1982), co-edited with Essop Patel
- The New African: A Study of the Life and Work of H.I.E. Dhlomo (Ravan Press, 1985)
- Tramp Royal: The True Story of Trader Horn (Wits University Press, 1992)
- A new edition of Sol Plaatje's Mhudi with (Francolin Publishers, 1996)
- Murder at Morija: Faith, Mystery, and Tragedy on an African Mission (University of Virginia Press, 2003)
- Battles of South Africa (David Philip, 2004)

== Awards ==
- 1993 Alan Paton Award (Tramp Royal)
