= Charles van Onselen =

South African historian

- Born: 14 August 1944 (age 82); Boksburg, Transvaal; Union of South Africa

Academic background
- Education: Rhodes University; University of the Witwatersrand; Oxford University
- Thesis: African mine labour in Southern Rhodesia, 1900-1933 (1974)

Academic work
- Institutions: University of Pretoria
- Notable works: The Seed is Mine

Charles van Onselen (birth 14 August 1944, Boksburg) is a researcher and historian based at the University of Pretoria, South Africa.

== Education ==
Van Onselen holds a B.Sc. and U.E.D. from Rhodes University, a B.A. Hons. from the University of the Witwatersrand, a D.Phil. from Oxford University and a D.Lit.(Honoris Causa) from Rhodes.

== Academic career ==
He is based at the University of Pretoria, South Africa.

== Recognition and awards ==
He received the Alan Paton Award for The Seed is Mine in 1997.

== Personal life ==
Charles was married to Belinda Bozzoli, and their three children including Gareth van Onselen.

== Selected works ==
- The Seed is Mine: The Life of Kas Maine, a South African Sharecropper 1894–1985 (1996), described as a "detailed and compelling history of the effect of South Africa's Land Laws on one man and his family"
- New Babylon New Nineveh: Everyday life on the Witwatersand 1886–1914, a social and economic history of the late nineteenth/early twentieth century Witwatersrand
- The Fox and the Flies (2007), a social, political, and economic history of the Trans-Atlantic underworld from about 1890 until 1918, the year Joseph Silver was executed by the Austro-Hungarian military, in which Van Onselen speculates that Silver could have been Jack the Ripper

== Bibliography ==
- Chibaro: African mine labour in Southern Rhodesia, 1900-1933. London: Pluto Press. 1976. ISBN 978-0902818880.
- Studies in the Social and Economic History of the Witwatersrand, 1886–1914: Volume I: New Babylon, Volume II: New Nineveh. Johannesburg: Ravan Press. 1982.
- The Small Matter of a Horse: The Life of 'Nongoloza' Mathebula, 1867-1948. Johannesburg: Ravan Press. 1984. ISBN 0869752391.
- The Seed is Mine: The Life of Kas Maine, A South African Sharecropper, 1894-1985. Oxford: James Currey. 1996.
- The Fox and the Flies: The Secret Life of a Grotesque Master Criminal. New York: Walker Publishing. 2007. ISBN 978-0-8027-1641-5.
- Masked Raiders: Irish Banditry in Southern Africa, 1880-1899. Cape Town: Zebra Press. 2010. ISBN 9781770220805.
- Showdown at the Red Lion: The Life and Times of Jack McLoughlin, 1859-1910. Johannesburg: Jonathan Ball. 2015. ISBN 9781868426225.
- The Cowboy Capitalist: John Hays Hammond, The American West, and the Jameson Raid. Johannesburg: Jonathan Ball Publishers. 2017. ISBN 9781868427383.
- The Night Trains. Johannesburg: Jonathan Ball Publishers. 2019. ISBN 9781868429806.
