= The Seed Is Mine =

- First South African paperback edition, 1996
- Author: Charles van Onselen
- Publisher: David Philip
- Publication date: 1996
- Awards: Alan Paton Award for Nonfiction (1997); Herskovits Prize (1997)
- ISBN: 080909603X

The Seed is Mine: The Life of Kas Maine, a South African Sharecropper 1894-1985 is a microhistorical study by Charles van Onselen. It is a profound social history of an African peasant sharecropper and his family in a racially divided South Africa. Van Onselen paints a stark picture of the relationship between landowner and farmer and its development in an increasingly racist society.

Van Onselen details the developing familial structures in South Africa, affected by the South African War, finding of diamonds and Apartheid.

== Sources ==
- Current History Review
- Graeber, Laurel (16 March 1997). "New & Noteworthy Paperbacks". The New York Times.
