= Ma Nala =

- Born: Aphelele Mnyango; 4 October 1994 (age 31); Bhisho, Eastern Cape, South Africa
- Genres: Soul music; Pop; R&B; Neo Soul
- Occupations: singer; songwriter
- Years active: 2016–present
- Label: YAL Entertainment
- Website: ma-nala.com

Aphelele Mnyango, better known as Ma Nala, is a South African singer, songwriter born in Bhisho, Eastern Cape. Ma Nala comes from a musical family. Her late father, Zolisa "Senzol" Mnyango was one of the first DJs at Radio Ciskei and her older brother is acclaimed South African producer and artist Anatii. Ma Nala began her musical journey by studying music in Los Angeles, California, being mentored by Phillip Ingram.

The artist takes her moniker from her family's Xhosa clan name.

== Discography ==
=== Singles ===
List of singles, with selected information
Title	Single details
Tryna Find Love	Released: 14 February 2017; Label: YAL Entertainment; Formats: Digital download
Soze	Released: 3 November 2017; Label: YAL Entertainment; Formats: Digital download
Forever feat. Gemini Major	Released: 26 October 2018; Label: YAL Entertainment; Formats: Digital download
