= Jeff Peires =

South African historian

Jeffrey Brian Peires is a South African historian at the University of Fort Hare. His book about the Xhosa cattle-killing movement of 1856–57, The Dead Will Arise, won the Alan Paton Award in 1990. Peires has also worked as a civil servant in the Eastern Cape and represented the African National Congress in the National Assembly for a brief period from 1994.

== Early life and education ==
Peires was born in Cape Town and studied history at the University of Cape Town and University of Wisconsin–Madison from 1972 to 1975. He is Jewish and his mother is a published historian of the Holocaust.

== Political career ==
In the 1994 South African general election, South Africa's first post-apartheid election, Peires was elected to represent the African National Congress in the National Assembly, the lower house of the South African Parliament. He resigned from his seat before the end of the legislative term. He later worked in the Eastern Cape Provincial Government.

== Academic career ==
As of 2022, Peires was emeritus professor of history at the University of Fort Hare in the Eastern Cape. His work largely concerns the history and historiography of the Xhosa people in the Cape. His best known monograph, The Dead Will Arise: Nongqawuse and the Great Xhosa Cattle-Killing of 1856–7, disputed then-prevalent materialist explanations of the millenarian Xhosa cattle-killing movement, emphasising instead the role of Nongqawuse's prophecies. Peires has also challenged Julian Cobbing's account, and other materialist accounts, of the Mfecane.

=== Responses to The Dead Will Arise ===
The Dead Will Arise was first published by Jonathan Ball in 1989 while Peires was lecturing at Rhodes University in Grahamstown and won the Alan Paton Award for non-fiction in 1990. Peires's interpretation of the causes of the cattle-moving movement was highly controversial among historians, but the book is viewed as having inaugurated a new and more critical phase in the historiography of the movement, drawing more extensively on Xhosa sources.

The book also provided much of the textual basis for Zakes Mda's acclaimed novel The Heart of Redness, to the extent that portions of Peires's text are reproduced verbatim in the novel. In 2008, Andrew Offenburger, a historian at Yale University, alleged that Mda's reliance on Peires's research amounted to "masquerading plagiarism as intertextuality". The allegation was published in Research in African Literature, which also published Mda's response, and was debated in the South African press. In an open letter in the Mail & Guardian, Mda wrote:

You only have to go to a search engine such as Google Scholar to realise that many academic papers have been written on this novel since 2002 and some of them make a thorough study of the intertextual relationship between The Heart of Redness and Jeff Peires's The Dead Will Arise. None of them makes the absurd accusation of "cribbing"... The story of Nongqawuse and the cattle killing is well known; as children we grew up with it. Our language is replete with proverbs based on that story and we sang songs about her. It is our story. Jeff Peires does not own that story. So I can't steal it from him. He did not invent it or create those events in the manner that I have created the fictional world in The Heart of Redness. But in The Dead Will Arise he rendered those events and interpreted them in a manner that captivated me. I didn't think of using the Nongqawuse story in any fiction because it was so commonplace until Peires wrote his history book. It was Peires's rendition of that story that inspired my fiction rather than the historical events themselves, and I had to make that obvious in my fiction by deliberately using Peires's phraseology as an intertextual device.

Mda also pointed out that he had acknowledged Peires's book as his historical basis in the dedication of the book and said that Peires approved of his use of The Dead Will Arise. Offenburger argued that the acknowledgement was insufficiently clear about the extent to which Peires's wording had been reproduced in the novel.
