= Mark Winkler =

South African writer

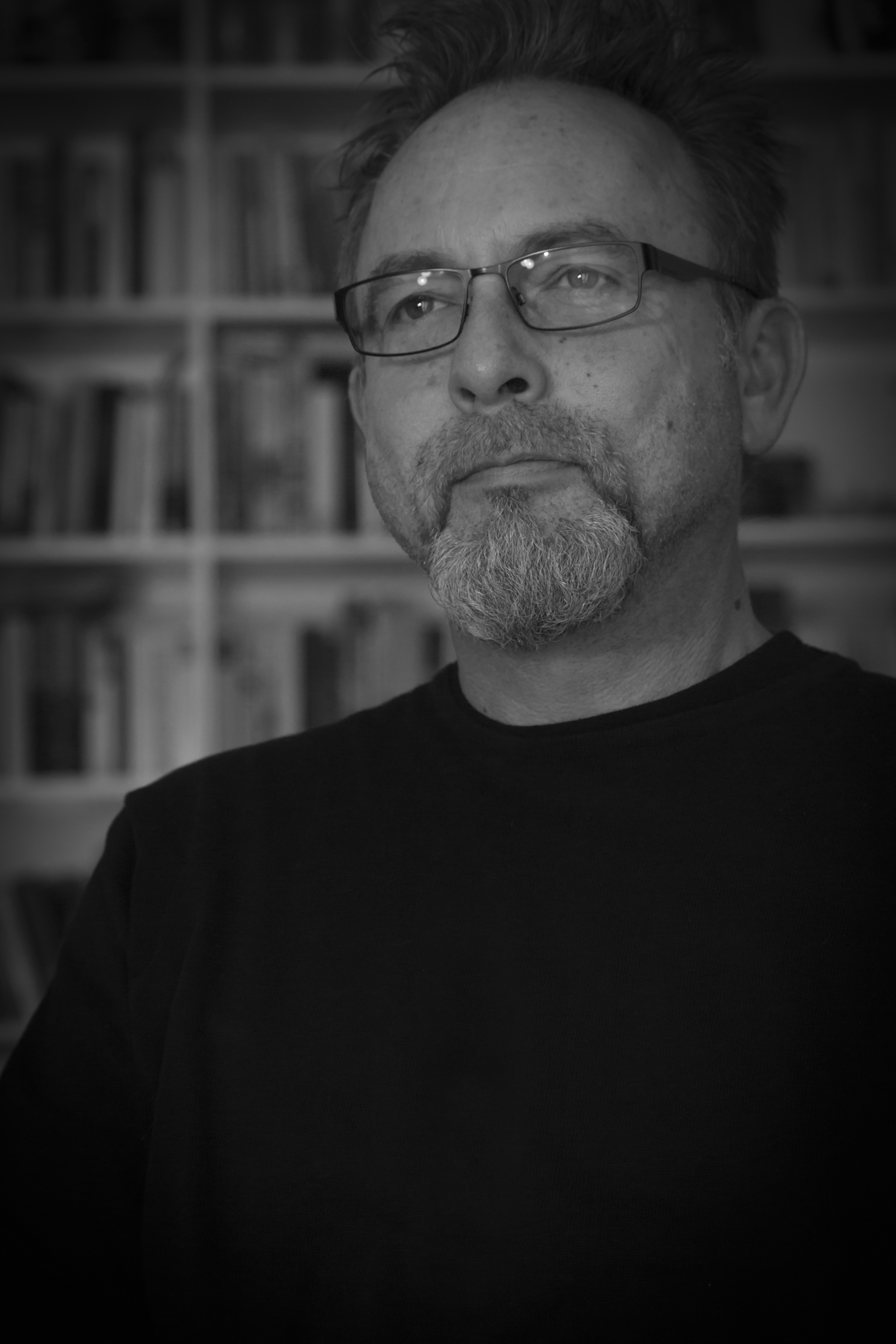
- Born: 29 January 1966 (age 60); Johannesburg, South Africa
- Occupation: Writer
- Writing career
- Genre: Fiction
- Notable works: An Exceptionally Simple Theory of Absolutely Everything and Wasted
- Website: themarkwinkler.blogspot.co.za

Mark Winkler (born 29 January 1966) is a South African writer of literary fiction living in Cape Town. He is the author of six novels, An Exceptionally Simple Theory of Absolutely Everything (2013), Wasted (2015), The Safest Place You Know (2016), Theo & Flora (2018), Due South of Copenhagen (2020) and The Errors of Dr Browne, published in August 2022.

== Life ==
Winkler was born in Johannesburg in 1966. He grew up in what is now Mpumalanga and attended high school at St. Alban's College, Pretoria. He graduated from Rhodes University, Grahamstown, with a Bachelor of Journalism in 1990.

== Works ==
=== Novels ===
His first novel, An Exceptionally Simple Theory of Absolutely Everything, has been described in a review as “an intensely absorbing and unapologetically apolitical tale”, and “remarkable in its refusal to conform to ideas of what a South African novel should be”.

His second novel, the Wasted, was longlisted for the 2016 Sunday Times Barry Ronge Fiction Prize. Wasted has been described as “tense, darkly humorous, unpredictable and thought-provoking”, “one of the year’s most ambitious, suspenseful, tightly controlled and expertly executed novels”.

=== Short stories ===
Winkler’s short story, When I Came Home, was shortlisted for the 2016 Commonwealth Writer’s Prize, one of 26 stories to be selected out of almost 4,000 submissions from 47 countries.

His short story, Ink, was awarded third prize in the 2016 Short Story Day Africa competition and was published in the anthology Water.

Winkler is a member of PEN South Africa.

== Published works ==
- An Exceptionally Simple Theory (of Absolutely Everything). Kwela. 2013. ISBN 978-0-7957-0451-2.
- Wasted. Kwela. 2015. ISBN 978-0-7957-0700-1.
- Ink, Water, Short Story Day Africa, 2016
- When I came home, adda, Commonwealth Writers, May 2016
- The Safest Place You Know. Penguin Random House. 2016. ISBN 978-1-4152-0909-7.
- The Theo & Flora. Penguin Random House. 2018. ISBN 978-1-4152-1019-2.
- Due South of Copenhagen. Penguin Random House. 2020. ISBN 978-1-4152-1047-5.
- The Errors of Dr Browne. Penguin Random House. 2022. ISBN 978-1-4859-0494-6.
