= Barry Ronge =

South African journalist (1948–2022)

- Born: Barry Johann Ronge; 30 December 1947; Hillbrow, Johannesburg, South Africa
- Died: 3 July 2022 (aged 74); Johannesburg, South Africa
- Other name: Rebecca Parker (pseudonym)
- Education: University of the Witwatersrand
- Occupations: journalist; columnist; writer; broadcaster; movie reviewer; raconteur
- Partner: Albertus van Dyk

Barry Johann Ronge (30 December 1947 – 3 July 2022) was a South African journalist, columnist, writer, broadcaster, movie reviewer and raconteur. He was one of the country's best-known movie critics as well as one of its most widely read (and discussed) columnists.

== Early life ==
Ronge was born in Hillbrow, Johannesburg, and grew up on the West Rand where he attended Florida Park High School. He completed his studies at the University of the Witwatersrand, after which he began a teaching career at St. John's College, followed by a ten-year stint as a lecturer in literature at the University of the Witwatersrand.

== Career ==
He later moved on to become a print and electronic journalist, specializing in the arts. In addition to writing movie reviews he was also a food critic in his early career writing under the pseudonym Rebecca Parker.

Ronge is best known for his Spit and Polish column in the Sunday Times, his movie reviews for the same newspaper, and his Sunday evening show on Radio 702 where he worked with is partner Albertus van Dyk. After writing for the Sunday Times for 27 years, he wrote his last column on 23 February 2014. In 2015, the Sunday Times renamed its prize for South African literature to the Barry Ronge Fiction Prize.

During the 1990s and 2000s Ronge was a film critic on M-Net where worked on a number of movie review shows most notably Front Row, Revue Plus and Cinemagic with Barry Ronge. He also appeared on the SABC 3 movie review show Screenplay.

== Death ==
He died in his hometown, Johannesburg, on 3 July 2022.

== Books ==
- Spit 'n Polish, 2006, Penguin Books SA, ISBN 9780143025252

== Awards ==
- Thomas Pringle Award for Reviews, English Academy of South Africa, 2005
- Barry Ronge Fiction Prize longlist.
