= The Exploded View =

2004 stories by Ivan Vladislavic

- First edition (publ. Random House)
- Author: Ivan Vladislavic
- Language: English
- Publisher: Random House
- Publication date: 1 January 2004
- ISBN: 9780958446860

The Exploded View is a quartet of stories by Ivan Vladislavic published in 2004. The stories revolve around four very different gauteng residents in Johannesburg: a statistician employed on the national census, an engineer out on the town with his council connections, an artist with an interest in genocide, and a contractor who erects billboards on building sites; each tries to make sense of a changed world after the demise of apartheid.
