= Highbury Preparatory School =

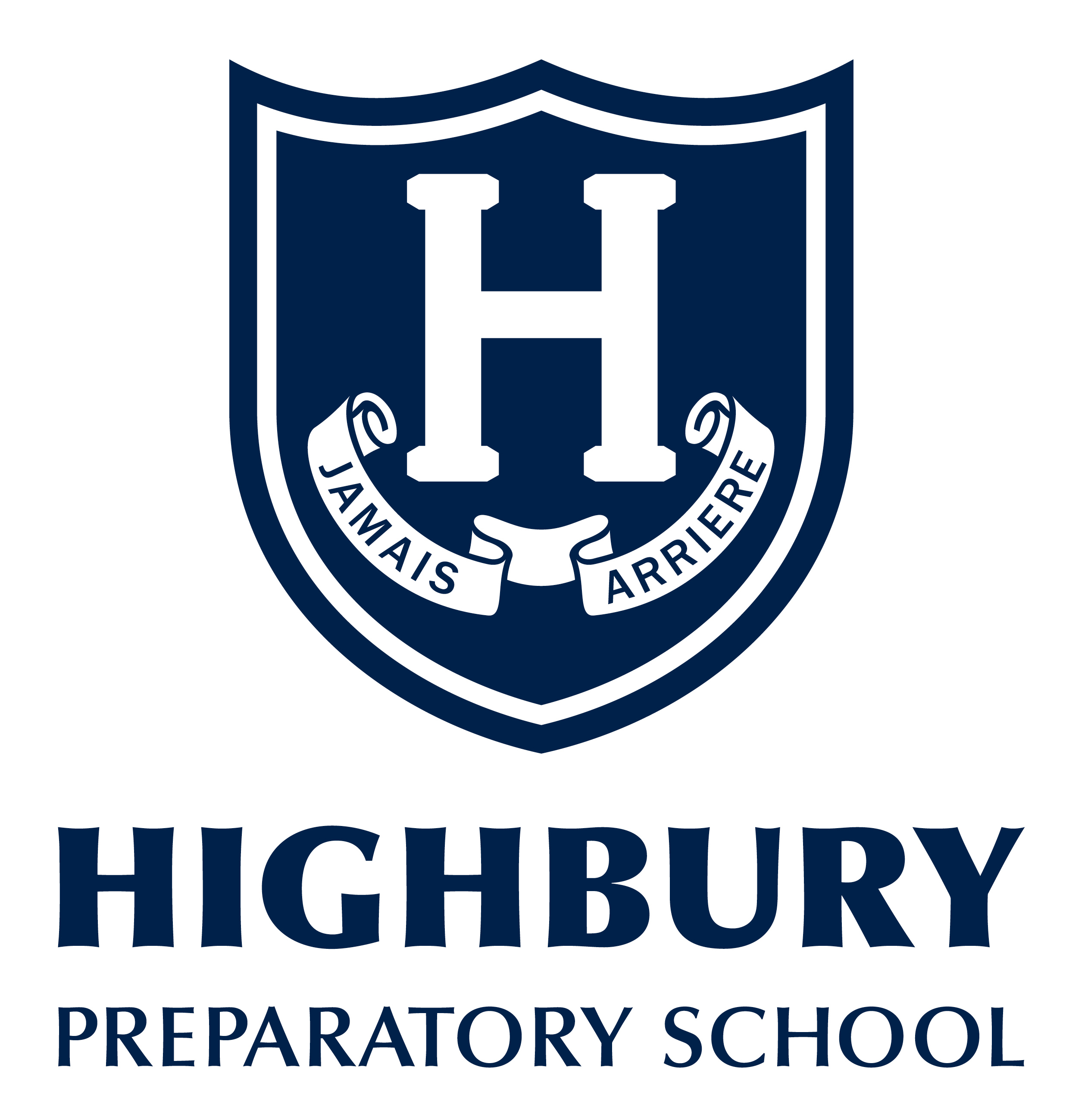
- Highbury Preparatory School crest

Location
- Hillcrest, KwaZulu-Natal; South Africa
- Coordinates: 29.7805°S 30.7577°E

Information
- Type: Private
- Motto: Jamais Arriere (Never Behind)
- Religious affiliation: Christian
- Established: 1903; 123 years ago
- Founder: Sibella Douglas McMillan
- Locale: Suburban
- Headteacher: Roland Lacock
- Grades: 0000 - 7
- Enrollment: 600+
- Colors: Navy blue, Khaki
- School fees: R68 652 - R138 544 p.a. (2024 Per year, depending on grade)
- Website: www.hps.co.za

Highbury Preparatory School is a South African private school for boys located in Hillcrest (eThekwini Metropolitan Municipality), KwaZulu-Natal.

== History ==
Highbury was founded in 1903 by Sibella Douglas McMillan, née Duff. It was named after Highbury House School in England, which was established by Sibella McMillan's father, the Reverend Charles Duff.

== Headteachers ==
- Sibella Douglas McMillan
- Elliot Douglas McMillan and in his absence, his brother Noel Douglas McMillan.
- John Sholto Douglas McMillan
- Robert Clarence
- Richard Stanly
- Brendon Carol (January 2015 - July 2016)
- Roland Lacock (January 2017 – present)

== Notable alumni ==
- Imraan Coovadia (author)
- Dale Benkenstein (cricketer)
- Paul Maritz (former Microsoft executive; VMware CEO)
- Mike Melvill (test pilot)
- Mike Procter (cricketer)
- Bobby Skinstad (rugby player)
- Lungi Ngidi (cricketer)

== Highbury Today ==
Highbury is a day school in Hillcrest, KwaZulu-Natal for boys from Grade R - 7.

Richard Stanley who succeeded Mr Clarence in 1994, was followed by Brendon Carrol in January 2015. In July 2017, Roland Lacock became Highbury's seventh Head Master.

In 2009, Highbury closed its boarding and opened a co-educational pre-primary school called Weavers' Nest. In 2017, Weavers' Nest opened a Grade 0000 class.
