= Andrew Brown (author) =

South African-born novelist

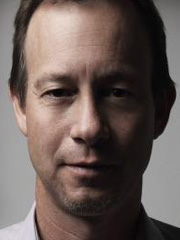
- Born: Cape Town, South Africa
- Occupations: Novelist, police reservist, advocate
- Writing career
- Language: English
- Notable awards: Sunday Times Fiction Prize (2006, 2024); Alan Paton Award (shortlisted in 2009); Commonwealth Writers' Prize (Africa Region) (shortlisted in 2010)

Andrew Brown is a South African novelist influenced by William Boyd and Ian McEwan, police reservist in the South African Police Service (SAPS), and an advocate. He is the author of four novels: Inyenzi, which centres on the Rwandan genocide, and the crime novels of Coldsleep Lullaby, Refuge and Solace. Brown is also the author of one non-fiction work, Street Blues, in which he writes about his experiences as a police reservist. Brown was the recipient of the 2006 Sunday Times Fiction Prize for Coldsleep Lullaby, and his work has been shortlisted for both the Alan Paton Award and the Commonwealth Writers' Prize (Africa Region).

== Achievements ==
Most notably, Andrew Brown was the recipient of the Sunday Times Fiction Prize for Coldsleep Lullaby in 2006. In addition, he was shortlisted for the Sunday Times Alan Paton award in 2009 for his non-fiction book Street Blues: The experiences of a reluctant policeman; and the Commonwealth Writers' Prize (Africa Region) for Refuge.. His books are published in South Africa, Germany, the Netherlands, the United States of America and Canada. In April 2014 he released his new book, Devil's Harvest, which is a political thriller set in South Sudan: the book is due for release in Germany in 2015.

== Personal life ==
Andrew Brown lives in Cape Town, and is married with three children. He was an activist in the 1980s against the apartheid regime and was arrested/detained on several occasions, spending time in Pollsmoor Prison in solitary confinement. In 1999, he joined the new South African Police Services as a reservist, in order to make a contribution towards the transformation of the police force. He is now a Sergeant in the SAPS and is stationed at Mowbray police station. He works as an advocate in private practice at the Cape High Court.

== Philosophy and Politics ==
Andrew Brown is an atheist. Brown describes himself as having a great respect for Judaism and as being a supporter of the old ANC political party in South Africa.

== Bibliography ==
=== Fiction ===
Andrew Brown is the author of four novels and one non-fiction title.

- Inyenzi (First published 2000; second publication 2007)
- Coldsleep Lullaby (First published 2005; second publication 2012)
- Refuge (2009)
- Solace (2012)
- Devil's Harvest (2014)
- The Heist Men (2022)
- The Bitterness of Olives (2023)

=== Non-Fiction ===
- Street Blues (2008)
- Good Cop, Bad Cop: Confessions of a Reluctant Policeman (2016)

=== Interviews ===
- "Meet Author Andrew Brown", Mary Corrigall, 28 August 2012
- "Andrew Brown Talks to Sue Grant-Marshall About Solace", BooksLIVE Podcast, 25 June 2014
- "Andrew Brown Chats to Nancy Richards About His Political Thriller, Devil’s Harvest", BooksLIVE Podcast, 3 August 2014

=== Reviews ===
- John Maytham book review of Devil's Harvest, 30 May. 2014
