= Ivan Vladislavic =

South African author, editor and professor

Ivan Vladislavić
- Born: Ivan Vladislavić; 17 September 1957 (age 69); Pretoria, South Africa
- Occupations: Author, editor, professor

Ivan Vladislavić

Ivan Vladislavić (born 17 September 1957) is a South African novelist, essayist and editor. Vladislavić's style has been described as postmodern, innovative, humorous and unpredictable. He has won numerous awards including Yale University’s Windham-Campbell Prize for fiction. He lives in Johannesburg where he is a Distinguished Professor in Creative Writing at the University of the Witwatersrand.

== Biography ==
Vladislavić was born in Pretoria in 1957. His father was a mechanic of Croatian heritage and his mother was a housewife. He attended the University of the Witwatersrand and graduated in 1979.

He has worked as Social Studies Editor for anti-apartheid publishing house Ravan Press and as an editor for Staffrider magazine.

He lives in Johannesburg, South Africa and is a Professor of Creative Writing at the University of the Witwatersrand.

== Bibliography ==
=== Novels ===
- The Folly (1993 New Africa Books David Philip; 2014 Penguin Random House (Umuzi); 2015 Archipelago Books: 2015 And Other Stories)
- The Restless Supermarket (2001 New Africa Books David Philip; 2012 Penguin Random House (Umuzi); 2014 And Other Stories)
- The Exploded View (2004 Random House; 2017 Penguin Random House (Umuzi); 2017 Archipelago Books)
- TJ/Double Negative (2010) with photographer David Goldblatt (Umuzi, Cape Town, 2010; Contrasto, Rome, 2010)
- Double Negative (2011 Penguin Random House (Umuzi); 2013 And Other Stories)
- A Labour of Moles (2012 Sylph Editions) An illustrated novella designed by Sunandini Banerjee
- The Distance (2019 Penguin Random House (Umuzi); 2020 Archipelago Books)

=== Collections ===
- Missing Persons (1989 New Africa Books David Philip)
- Propaganda by Monuments (1996 New Africa Books David Philip;
- Flashback Hotel: Early Stories (2010 Penguin Random House; 2019 Archipelago Books)
- 101 Detectives (2015 Penguin Random House; And Other Stories, 2015)

=== Essays & Nonfiction ===
- Willem Boshoff (2005 David Krut Publishing), extended essay on the work of conceptual artist Willem Boshoff
- Portrait with Keys (2006 Umuzi, Cape Town; Portobello, London; 2009 Norton, New York).
- The Loss Library and other unfinished stories (2011 Penguin Random House Umuzi, Cape Town; 2012 Seagull Books, Calcutta). A hybrid work blending "essay, fiction and literary genealogy"
- The Near North (2024 Pan Macmillan Picador)

=== As Editor ===
- Ten Years of Staffrider Magazine: 1978–1988, an anthology of the best work from the magazine, compiled and edited with Andries Oliphant (Ravan Press, Johannesburg, 1988)
- blank_Architecture, apartheid and after, edited with Hilton Judin (1998 Netherlands Architecture Institute, Rotterdam; New Africa Books David Philip, Cape Town).
- T’kama-Adamastor: Inventions of Africa in a South African Painting (2000 University of the Witwatersrand, Johannesburg)
- Ponte City, edited for Mikhael Subotzky and Patrick Waterhouse (Steidl, Göttingen, 2014)
- My Mother’s Laughter: Selected Poems of Chris van Wyk, edited with Robert Berold (2020 deep south books, Grahamstown/Makhanda)

== Selected interviews ==
- Steyn, Jan, 'Interview with Ivan Vladislavić' The White Review, August 2012
- De Kok, Ingrid, 'Ivan Vladislavić: The Restless Supermarket,' World Literature Today, January 2002
- De Vries, Fred, 'Joburg’s ambiguity mirrored in Portrait,' The Weekender, 9 September 2006
- Jooste, Pamela, 'In Conversation with Ivan Vladislavić,' LitNet, March 2005
- Warnes, Christopher, 'Interview with Ivan Vladislavić,' Modern fiction studies, 46 (1) Spring, 2000: pp 280.
- Interview with Ivan Vladislavić on The Ledge, an independent platform for world literature. Includes excerpt and audio.
- Malec, Jennifer ‘The fallible memory is surely at the heart of writing fiction’—Jennifer Malec interviews Ivan Vladislavić about his novel, The Distance,' The Johannesburg Review of Books, 6 May 2019
- Katie Kitamura, BOMB Magazine, No. 135, Spring 2016, pp. 72–8
- Gaylard Gerald, At Home With Ivan Vladislavić: An African Flaneur Greens the Postcolonial City (Routledge 2023)
- Hoby Hermione, 'The South African Parables of Ivan Vladislavić, The New Yorker, 8 August 2017
- Poyner Jane and Jewel Josh, 'An Interview with Ivan Vladislavić', Contemporary Literature, University of Wisconsin Press 20, June 2022
- Msimang Sisonke, 'Acts of Faith and Frightening Fictions: An interview with Ivan Vladislavić' Wasafiri Vol 36, Issue 3, 3 July 2021

== Awards and honors ==
- 1991: Olive Schreiner Prize, Missing Persons
- 1993: CNA Literary Award, The Folly
- 1994: Thomas Pringle Prize, "Propaganda by Monuments" and "The WHITES ONLY Bench"
- 1997: Honorable Mention, Noma Award for Publishing in Africa, "Propaganda by Monuments"
- 2002: Sunday Times Fiction Prize, The Restless Supermarket
- 2007: Sunday Times Alan Paton Award for Nonfiction, Portrait with Keys
- 2007: University of Johannesburg Prize, Portrait with Keys
- 2009: Long-listed, Warwick Prize for Writing, Portrait with Keys
- 2011: University of Johannesburg Prize, Double Negative
- 2011: M-Net Literary Awards, Double Negative
- 2015: Windham–Campbell Literature Prize for Fiction, valued at $150,000
