= Justin D. Fox =

South African author, photojournalist, lecturer and editor

Justin Fox
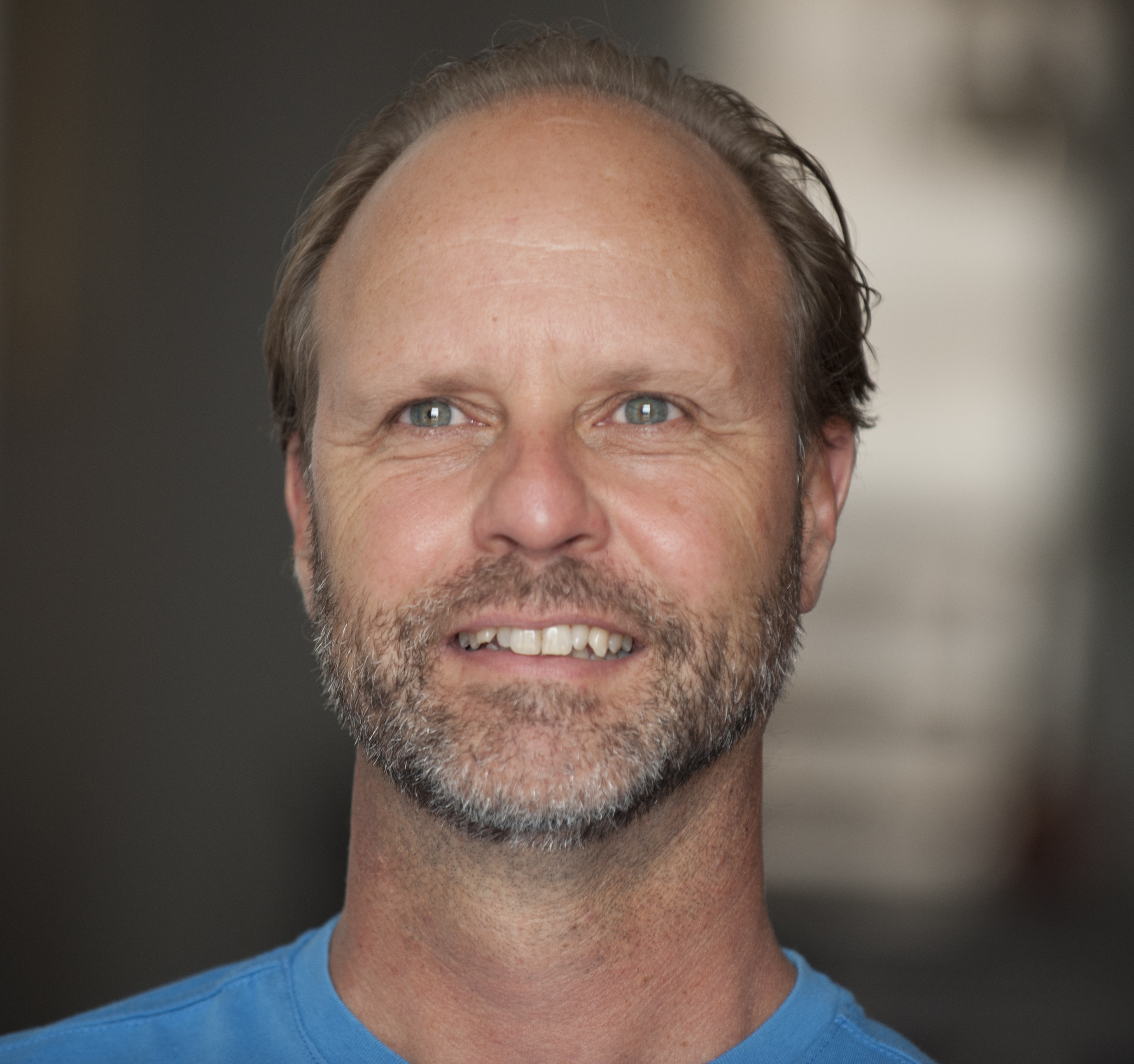
- Born: 4 May 1967 (age 59); Cape Town
- Citizenship: South Africa
- Education: SACS; University of Cape Town; Oxford University
- Occupations: author, photojournalist, lecturer and editor
- Organization: Getaway travel magazine
- Notable work: The Cape Raider; Whoever Fears the Sea; The Marginal Safari; Secret Cape Town; The Impossible Five

Justin D. Fox (born 4 May 1967) is a South African author, photojournalist, lecturer and editor living in Cape Town, South Africa. He was editor of Getaway travel magazine until 2020, and has freelanced internationally for many newspapers and magazines. Educated at SACS junior and high schools, he graduated from the University of Cape Town with a BA in English in 1990. He was elected as a Rhodes Scholar in 1991 and graduated with a masters and a doctorate in English from Oxford University. He is the author of more than a dozen books, ranging from travel and children's literature to photography and fiction.

Fox's book The Impossible Five named South Africa's most elusive animals, including the Cape mountain leopard, the aardvark, the ground pangolin, the white lion, and the riverine rabbit. They are almost impossible to track in the wild, and spotting one in the wild is considered a major accomplishment.

== Awards and honours ==
- 1991 – Rhodes Scholarship to the University of Oxford
- 1999 – Mondi Award for journalism
- 2004 – Mondi Award for journalism
- 2006 – third place, J. M. Coetzee PEN short-story award
- 2009 – runner-up, PICA Travel Writer of the Year Award
- 2011 – longlist, Alan Paton Award for non-fiction (for The Marginal Safari)
- 2012 – longlist, Olive Schreiner Prize for literature (for The Marginal Safari)
- 2012 – runner-up, PICA Travel Writer of the Year Award
- 2012 – ANFASA bursary for non-fiction writing
- 2014 – longlist, Etisalat Prize for Literature (for Whoever Fears the Sea)
- 2014 – Patricia Schonstein – Poetry in McGregor Award

== Bibliography ==
=== Books ===
- The Cape Raider
- The 30-Year Safari
- My Great Expedition
- Mijn Kleine Safari
- Secret Cape Town
- The Impossible Five
- The Hobbsian Line
- Whoever Fears the Sea: A Novel
- African Epic: The Untamed Mountain-Bike Race
- The Marginal Safari: Scouting the Edge of South Africa
- Africa Lens: 20 years of Getaway Photography
- Cape Town Calling
- Under the Sway: a Photographic Journey Through Mozambique
- Just Add Dust: Overland from Cape to Cairo
- The Best of Getaway Gallery
- With Both Hands Waving
- The Life and Art of François Krige
- Revel Fox: Reflections on the Making of Space
