= Gangster State =

2019 non-fiction book by Pieter-Louis Myburgh

Gangster State: Unravelling Ace Magashule's Web of Capture
- Author: Pieter-Louis Myburgh
- Language: English
- Subject: Ace Magashule, Politics of South Africa
- Genre: Non-fiction
- Publisher: The Penguin Group (SA) (Pty) Ltd
- Publication date: March 2019
- Publication place: South Africa
- Pages: 360
- ISBN: 9781776093748

Gangster State: Unravelling Ace Magashule's Web of Capture (2019) is a book by Pieter-Louis Myburgh, a South African investigative journalist. The book is an account of Ace Magashule's rise to power as premier of the Free State and his impact on both the African National Congress (ANC) and the South African government.

== Synopsis ==
The book explores Magashule's relationship with the controversial Gupta family and alleges that he was responsible for a number of corrupt activities. It explores the methods used to maintain his premiership and elevate him to the post of secretary-general of the ruling African National Congress (ANC) party. It also reveals that he was about to be arrested by the Scorpions prior to their disbanding in 2009.

== Reception ==
The Daily Maverick described the likely impact of the book and the corruption case it makes against Magashule as detonating "like a hand-grenade" in South African politics.

The ANC made a number of statements regarding the book. It initially criticized the book and accused Myburgh of being a former member of Stratcom, a disinformation unit in the apartheid-era security police, and spreading anti-ANC propaganda. Two days later the ANC stated that it would only be making a statement on the book after following "due processes" as the ANC secretary-general “had no authority to release a statement” on behalf of the ANC on issues that affected him personally.

Following the book's publication, supporters of Magashule destroyed copies of the book while disrupting an event to launch the book in Sandton City. Free State ANC Youth League (ANCYL) spokesperson Sello Pietersen went on to state that they would organize a book burning event in Mangaung to destroy copies of the book. Magashule denied any role in the disruption whilst the ANC condemned the book burning event stating that it undermined freedom of expression. Due to security concerns following the Sandton City disruption, the Cape Town book launch had to be moved to an alternative location, the offices of CapeTalk.
