= Pieter-Louis Myburgh =

South African investigative journalist

Pieter-Louis Myburgh is a South African investigative journalist.

Myburgh attended Paul Roos Gymnasium before obtaining his BPhil in Journalism at honours level from Stellenbosch University.

On 18 March 2016 he was honoured with the 2016 Taco Kuiper Award for Investigative Journalism for his exposé on impropriety at the publicly owned rail corporation, Prasa. The judges of the Taco Kuiper Award praised Myburgh for his work describing it as "classic investigative work: careful, patient probing to find supporting evidence for an abuse of public moneys, backed up with solid documentation, and powerfully presented to ensure it had impact". During the course of his investigation into impropriety in government procurement sacked Prasa boss Lucky Montana allegedly attacked him with a brick, damaging his car.

He is currently employed at News24. He is the author of The Republic of Gupta, an investigation into state capture by the Gupta family, and Gangster State, on Ace Magashule, the Secretary-General of the African National Congress.
