= Imraan Coovadia =

South African novelist

- Born: 1970 (age 55–56); Durban, South Africa
- Occupations: Writer, Associate Professor (UCT), Director of Creative Writing Program (UCT)
- Writing career
- Period: 2001 -
- Notable works: High Low In-between, The Institute for Taxi Poetry, Tales of the Metric System

Imraan Coovadia (born 1970) is a South African novelist, essayist, and academic. He is the director of the creative writing program at the University of Cape Town. He has taught 19th-Century Studies and Creative Writing at a number of US universities. His debut novel, The Wedding, published simultaneously in the US and SA in 2001, has been translated into Hebrew and Italian.

== Background ==
Imraan Coovadia was born in Durban, in 1970, South Africa to Jerry Coovadia and Zubie (Zubeida) Hamed. His father is a well-known AIDS activist, member of the UDF and doctor. His mother is a dermatologist. He is a regular contributor to various newspapers, journals and magazines such as N+1, Agni, The New York Times, Boston Globe, The Times of India, and South Africa's The Mail and Guardian and Sunday Independent (South Africa).

== Education and career ==
Coovadia spent his early years in Durban, attending Highbury Preparatory School where he was the School Dux and then the prestigious Hilton College (South Africa) before moving to the United States to study at Harvard College where he majored in Philosophy. Later, he would achieve his doctorate at Yale University. He currently lectures at the University of Cape Town (UCT), and is the director of the Creative Writing program.

== Life and writing ==
Coovadia has travelled and lived widely, as extensively as, London, Melbourne, Boston, New York City, Durban and Cape Town. His writing reflects this in its diverse themes and influences. His early novels were focused more on South African Indian experiences. He was also influenced stylistically by V. S. Naipaul and others. His first novel, The Wedding, was published in 2001. The novel was well received, garnering a variety of accolades such as runner-up in the Sunday Times Fiction Award (2002), longlisted for the International Dublin Literary Award, a finalist for the first annual Connecticut Book Award, and short-listed for the Ama-Boeke Prize (2003).

His early writing is considered an important addition to Indian-South African literature, in that it deals with the issues of migration, mobility, historical concerns, loss of culture and nationality. His style is comedic and thoughtful. His later writing, such as the Institute for Taxi Poetry, is set in Cape Town and explores both the taxi industry and the intricacies of life in Cape Town.

As an academic at UCT, his research interests include: 18- and 19th-century English and American literature, philosophy and literature, political and social thought of the 18th and 19th centuries including Adam Smith, Hazlitt, Hume, Edmund Burke, and Swift, and contemporary fiction. Coovadia is also known for his contribution to the controversial debate surrounding JM Coetzee's biography by J.C Kannemeyer. His writing has been the focus of a 2016 special issue of the scholarly journal Current Writing.

== Awards ==
His debut novel, The Wedding, was shortlisted for the 2002 Sunday Times Fiction Award, Ama-Boeke Prize (2003), International Dublin Literary Award (2005), and was chosen as book of the week by Exclusive Books (South Africa) and Asian Week.com. He has also won The Sunday Times Fiction Prize and the University of Johannesburg Prize for his 2010 novel, High Low In-between and the English category of the M-Net Literary Awards for his 2012 novel, The Institute for Taxi Poetry.

== Fictions ==
=== The Wedding ===
The Wedding (2001) was published by Picador. The Wedding is a novel that describes the journey of Ismet Nassin from India to South Africa and the love story between Ismet and Khateja. The story is based on Coovadia's grandparents' journey to South Africa. The book has also been called a subcontinental version of Shakespeare's The Taming of the Shrew.

=== Green-eyed Thieves ===
Green-eyed Thieves (2006) was published by Seagull Books. The novel centres on the relationship between twins, Firoze and Ashraf. It deals with an adventurous family of criminals.

=== High Low In-between ===
High Low In-between (2009) was published by HarperCollins. It details the life of Nafisa, a doctor, in turmoil when her husband is murdered.

=== The Institute for Taxi Poetry ===
In this novel, Solly Greenfields, a taxi poet, is killed. Adam Ravens, Solly's protégé, attempts to make sense of his life and that of Solly's after his death. The novel was published in 2012 by Random House Struik.

=== Tales of the Metric System ===
Tales of the Metric System was published by Ohio University Press and is Coovadia's fifth novel. It is said to be inspired by novels like Ghostwritten and Cloud Atlas by David Mitchell, Half of a Yellow Sun by Chimamanda Adichie, Tales of the Metric System explores a modern South Africa in segments, beginning during Apartheid up until the FIFA World Cup in 2010.

=== A Spy in Time ===
A Spy in Time was published by Rare Bird Books and is Coovadia's sixth novel. It is a science fiction tale featuring time travel and centres on the adventures of Enver Eleven, a black time-traveler from Johannesburg, the only existing city on Earth after the strike of a supernova.

== Publications ==
- The Wedding (2001)
- Green-Eyed Thieves (2006)
- Authority and Authorship in V. S. Naipaul (2009)
- High Low In-Between (2009)
- The Institute for Taxi Poetry (2012)
- Transformations: Essays (2012)
- Tales of the Metric System (2014)
- A Spy in Time (2018)
