= New Africa Books =

South African book publisher

New Africa Books is a South African book publisher based in Cape Town. The company incorporates David Philip Publishers, one of South Africa's oldest and most influential independent publishers. New Africa Books currently publishes literary and educational books for adults, children and young adults. It is one of the very few publishing imprints in South Africa to publish books in all 11 official South African languages.

== History ==
David Philip Publishers was originally founded in 1971 by David Philip and his wife and business partner Marie Philip, with the aim of publishing “books that matter for Southern Africa” and that challenged the apartheid regime. The company proceeded to publish many of the great figures of African and South African literature, including Nobel Prize laureates Nadine Gordimer and Wole Soyinka. Among the many renowned authors they published were Mongane Wally Serote, Ivan Vladislavic, Alan Paton, Miriam Tlali, Pauline Smith and Mandla Langa.

One of the company's achievements was the groundbreaking Africasouth paperback series, a series devoted to republishing "important works of southern African literature that are at present ... not readily accessible"; the series included writers from "Africa south-of-the-Sahara", several recently unbanned books, and historical works dating back to 1911. By 1985, this series included titles by notable authors including Stephen Gray, Guy Butler, Can Themba, Todd Matshikiza and Ngũgĩ wa Thiong'o.

In 1992, Nadine Gordimer stated: “David and Marie Philip started an independent publishing firm in South Africa during some of the darkest days of censorship. Their unintimidated aim was to publish good books. In spite of all odds, they have come of age as among not only the bravest but also the most highly regarded of our publishers. I am happy to be on their list.” After his death in 2009, the former Sunday Times (South Africa) books editor Ben Williams wrote glowingly: "To call David Philip a publishing giant would be to do him an injustice. He was a colossus who shaped the modern South African English canon more than anyone else. The catalogue of South African books that he first breathed into life upon establishing his imprint in 1971 is a near-inexhaustible source of literary nourishment. Many of us were raised on it."

Shortly after the Philips’ retirement in 1999, David Philip Publishers was bought by New African Investments Limited (the first black-owned business on the Johannesburg Stock Exchange), and merged with two other publishers to form New Africa Books. Journalist, editor, a co-founder of New African Investments, Zwelakhe Sisulu, became the major shareholder of the new publisher. The company is currently owned by the Sisulu family. In 2013, Sisulu's nephew Shaka Sisulu, New Africa Books and the Sisulu family donated 25,000 children's books to the Nal'ibali Literacy Project in memory of his late uncle.

== Imprints ==
The company currently publishes under two imprints: New Africa Books, and the historical David Philip imprint.

- New Africa Books:

In addition to "trade books of political, historical and cultural import for the South African and international market", the list focuses on literacy development in children and young adults, in various South Africa languages. Prominent titles include the language courses Clicking with Xhosa and Zooming in on Zulu. This list also holds the popular Kwezi graphic-novel series, written and illustrated by Loyiso Mkize - South Africa's first superhero comic.

- David Philip:

The imprint remains a leading name in South African fiction, with a catalogue that includes award-winning writers. The imprint also contains the young-adult Siyagruva series, as well as Sindiwe Magona’s African Folk Tales series – South African folktales, individually published in all official South African languages.

== Notable current authors ==
- Sindiwe Magona
- Richard Rive - new editions of the late author's best-known works such as Buckingham Palace, District Six and Emergency
- Mohale Mashigo
- Gcina Mhlophe
- Elinor Sisulu
- Ben Turok
