= Siphiwe Gloria Ndlovu =

Zimbabwean novelist and filmmaker (born 1977)

- Born: 1977 (age 48–49); Bulawayo, Zimbabwe
- Education: Girls' College
- Alma mater: Emerson College; Emerson College; Ohio University; Stanford University
- Occupations: Novelist and filmmaker
- Notable work: The Theory of Flight (2018); The History of Man (2022); The Quality of Mercy (2023)
- Awards: Sunday Times Fiction Prize; Windham–Campbell Prize

Siphiwe Gloria Ndlovu (born 1977) is a Zimbabwean novelist and filmmaker.

== Background ==
Siphiwe Gloria Ndlovu was born and partly grew up in the city of Bulawayo, Zimbabwe. A few months after she was born, her family moved to Sweden as political refugees, and this is where Ndlovu spent the formative years of her life. The family then moved to the United States, and returned to Zimbabwe after 1980 when the country had attained its independence.

Ndlovu attended Girls' College in Bulawayo and thereafter went to the United States to pursue her university studies in Boston, Massachusetts (at Emerson College); Athens, Ohio (at Ohio University) and Palo Alto, California (at Stanford University). She spent 18 years in the United States, before deciding to move back to Africa, where she lived between South Africa and Zimbabwe.

== Writing career ==
Ndlovu's fiction has gained critical acclaim since her appearance on the literary scene in 2018. Her debut novel, The Theory of Flight (2018), was followed in 2020 by The History of Man. The two books have won praise, been included on the shortlists of awards, and have earned their author places at prestigious fellowships around the world. The third title in her "City of Kings" trilogy is The Quality of Mercy (2023).

Besides her creative writing, Ndlovu is a trained literary scholar. She is also a filmmaker, and her films have premiered at the Zanzibar International Film Festival, among other festivals.

== Awards and honours ==
- Miles Morland Writing Scholarship (2018)
- Sunday Times Fiction Prize (2019) for The Theory of Flight
- Windham–Campbell Prize (2022), category of fiction

== Publications ==
- The Theory of Flight. South Africa: Penguin Random House. 2018. ISBN 978-1-4152-1011-6.
- The History of Man. Catalyst Press. 2022. ISBN 978-1-946395-56-6.
- The Quality of Mercy. Catalyst Press. 2023.
