= Maxine Case =

South African writer

Maxine Case (born January 17, 1976, in Cape Town) is a South African novelist, and short story writer. Her debut novel, All We Have Left Unsaid, (Kwela Books, 2006) won the 2007 Commonwealth Writers’ Prize for Best First Book, Africa Region and was the joint winner of the Herman Charles Bosman Prize 2007.

She was a 2009 International Writing Program fellow at the University of Iowa and a writer in residence at the City of Asylum/Pittsburgh from November 2009 to February 2010.

== Works ==
- All We Have Left Unsaid, Kwela Books, 2006, ISBN 978-0-7957-0229-7
- J. M. Coetzee (ed.) "Homing Pigeons", African Compass: New Writing from Southern Africa, New Africa Books, 2005, ISBN 978-0-86486-580-9
- Waarover we zwegen, Mistral Uitgevers, 2009, ISBN 978-90-499-5126-9
