= Mark Gevisser =

South African author and journalist

- Born: 1964 (age 61–62); South Africa
- Education: Yale University
- Occupation: Journalist

Mark Gevisser (born 1964) is a South African author and journalist. His latest book is The Pink Line: Journeys Across the World's Queer Frontiers (2020). Previous books include A Legacy of Liberation: Thabo Mbeki and the Future of the South African Dream and Lost and Found in Johannesburg: A Memoir. His journalism has appeared in many publications, including The Guardian, The New York Times, Granta, and the New York Review of Books.

== Early life ==
Mark Gevisser was born in 1964 in South Africa to a family of Lithuanian Jewish heritage. He graduated from Yale University in 1987 magna cum laude with a degree in comparative literature.

== Career ==
Gevisser started his career in New York, where he worked for Village Voice and The Nation before returning to South Africa in 1990. Over the years, his work has been published in the Mail & Guardian, The Sunday Times, the Sunday Independent, The New York Times Magazine, The Observer, The Guardian and The New York Times.

Gevisser's book on the South African president, Thabo Mbeki: The Dream Deferred, won the 2008 Alan Paton Award; his political profiles were collected as Portraits of Power: Profiles in a New South Africa, published in 1996; and he co-edited Defiant Desire: Gay and Lesbian Lives in South Africa with Edwin Cameron. An abridged version of the Mbeki biography, A Legacy of Liberation: Thabo Mbeki and the Future of the South African Dream, was published in 2009, with an epilogue briefly detailing Mbeki's ousting at the hands of Jacob Zuma. Gevisser's book Lost and Found in Johannesburg: A Memoir was published in 2014. It was among the finalists for that year's Jan Michalski Prize.

Gevisser joined the new political party Rise Mzansi in February 2024 as its 'strategic communications' advisor, disclosing this in a New York Review of Books article in October 2024, 3 months after the end of South Africa's 2024 elections in which the party obtained 0.42% of the national vote.

=== Books ===
- Portraits of Power: Profiles in a Changing South Africa (David Philip, 1996, ISBN 9780864863140)
- Thabo Mbeki: The Dream Deferred (Jonathan Ball Publishers, 2007, ISBN 9781868423019)
  - Abridged version: A Legacy of Liberation: Thabo Mbeki and the Future of the South African Dream (St. Martin's Press, 2009, ISBN 9780230611009)
- Lost and Found in Johannesburg: A Memoir (Farrar, Straus and Giroux, 2014, ISBN 9780374176761)
- The Pink Line: Journeys Across the World's Queer Frontiers (Farrar, Straus and Giroux, 2020, ISBN 9780374279967)
