= Margie Orford =

Novelist, journalist, film director, activist (born 1964)

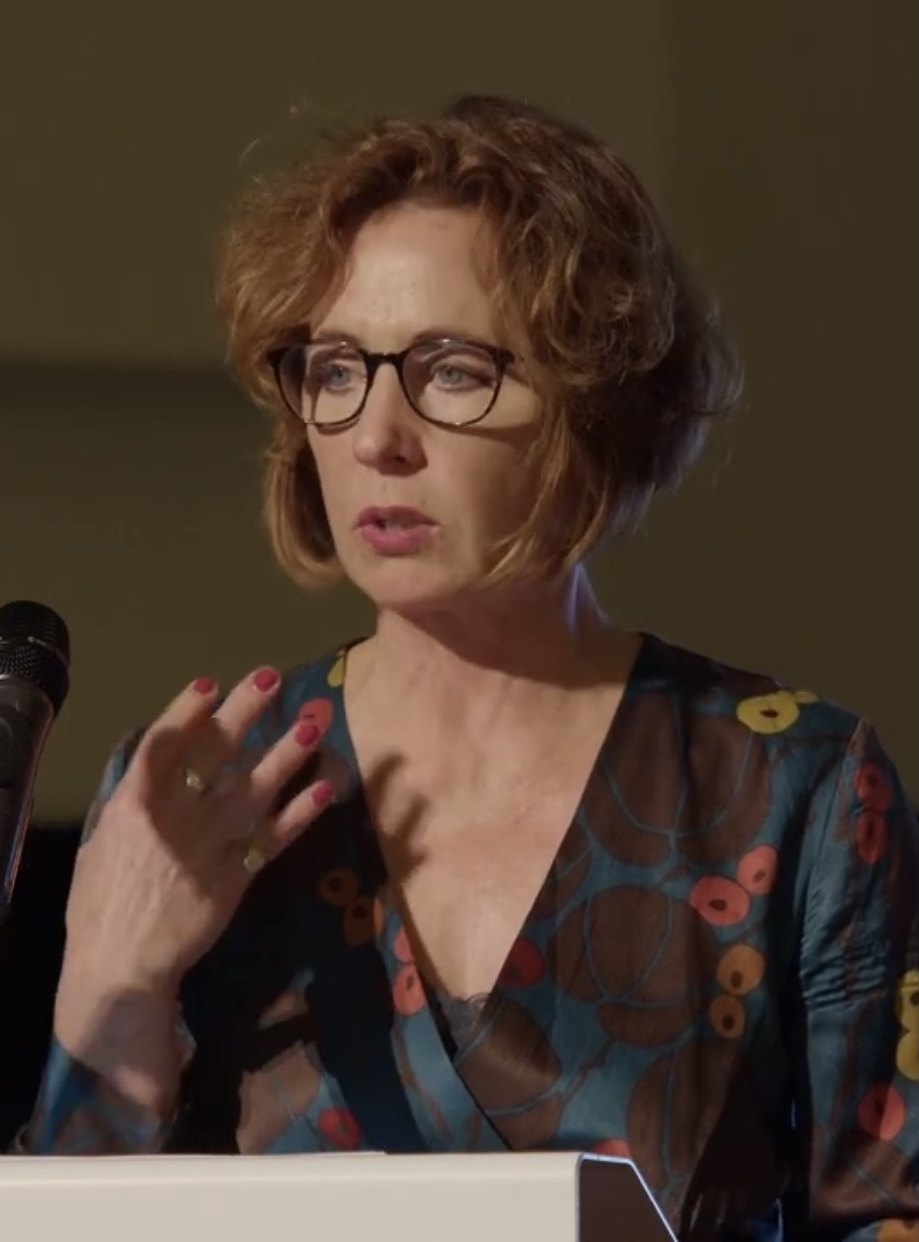
- Orford at the British Library in 2022
- Born: 30 September 1964 (age 61); London
- Education: University of Cape Town
- Occupations: Novelist, journalist, film director
- Writing career
- Genres: Crime fiction, children's literature, non-fiction, school textbooks

Margie Orford (born 30 September 1964) is a South African journalist, film director and author of crime fiction, children's fiction, non-fiction and school text books.

== Biography ==
Orford was born in London and grew up in Namibia and South Africa. She was detained during the 1985 State of Emergency while a student at the University of Cape Town, taking her final examinations in prison. After travelling widely, she studied under J. M. Coetzee before embarking on a career in publishing in the newly emerged Namibia. She returned to live in South Africa in 2001.

She holds a PhD from the University of East Anglia.

== Works ==
=== Crime fiction ===
- Like Clockwork. South Africa: Jonathan Ball Publishers SA. October 2008. ISBN 978-1-86842-327-9.
- Daddy's Girl. South Africa: Jonathan Ball Publishers SA. 2009. ISBN 978-1-86842-326-2.
- Blood Rose. South Africa: Jonathan Ball Publishers SA. August 2009. ISBN 978-1-86842-348-4.
- Gallows Hill. United Kingdom: Atlantic Books. September 2011. ISBN 978-1-86842-395-8.
- Water Music. South Africa: Jonathan Ball Publishers SA. July 2013. ISBN 978-1-86842-396-5.

=== Non-fiction ===
With Schimke, Karin (30 September 2006). Fabulously 40 and Beyond: Coming into Your Power an Embracing Change. Spearhead P. ISBN 978-0-86486-588-5.

=== Journalism ===
- "Once upon a life: Margie Orford". The Guardian. 4 September 2011. Archived from the original on 9 March 2014.
- "Oscar Pistorius trial: the imaginary black stranger at heart of the defence". The Guardian. 4 March 2014. Archived from the original on 11 March 2014.
