= Qaqambile Matanzima =

South African politician and tribal leader

Qaqambile Matanzima (15 December 1949 – 5 August 2013) was a South Africa politician and tribal leader. Matanzima had served as a colonel in the former Transkei Defence Force (TDF), the military force the Republic of Transkei, a de facto independent Bantustan which existed from 1976 to 1994. After Transkei was reincorporated into South Africa, Matanzima joined the South African National Defence Force (SANDF), leaving the military as a colonel in 1996. He was nicknamed "Big Q."

== Biography ==
Born on 15 December 1949, Matanzima was one of the four sons of George Matanzima (1918-2000). His father would later become the Prime Minister of Transkei and the leader of the now defunct Transkei National Independence Party.

== Career ==
Qaqambile Matanzima began his career as a teacher at the Mncuncuzo Junior Secondary in Cofimvaba, South Africa. He then joined the Transkei Defence Force (TDF) when he was 36 years old in 1975, shortly before Transkei was declared independent by South Africa. He achieved the rank of colonel in the TDF.

In 1986 and 1987, Transki Prime Minister George Matanzima and several other Transkei politicians were implicated in a scandal over the embezzlement of funding originally intended for a housing project. Under pressure from South Africa to resolve the crisis, the Transkei Defence Force served papers on 3 September 1987, ordering Prime Minister George Mathanzima and six Transkei cabinet minister to reign from office. Prime Minister Mathanzima and the six ministers resigned from office on 2 October 1987, completing the military coup. Qaqambile Matanzima, a colonel within the TDF at the time, sided with the military during the takeover.

Qaqambile Matanzima was among the senior members of the Transkei military who planned the removal of his father from office. He did not alert his father or his father's political allies of the military's plans. In 2013, following Qaqambile Matanzima's death, the President of the United Democratic Movement Bantu Holomisa, a former Transkei Defence Force officer who led the 1987 military coups, recalled Qaqambile Matanzima's support for the 1987 ouster of the Prime Minister, noting that Matanzima had to choose between his family and the military. Holomisa told reporters, "He was part of the senior military officers who planned a coup to remove his own father, George Matanzima, who was prime minister at the time...He showed great loyalty to the military. He did not even tip-off his father. He was part of those who wanted to uproot fraud and corruption and ensure clean governance in the Transkei government. This is great loss." Matanzima's father, former Prime Minister George Matanzima, fled into exile in Austria before returning to South Africa, where he served three years in prison before being pardoned.

The Transkei Defence Force was dissolved in 1994 when Transkei was reincorporated into South Africa. Qaqambile Matanzima achieved the rank of colonel in the South African National Defence Force (SANDF) before leaving the military in 1996.

Matanzima became the leader of the Mtshanyane Traditional Council, as well as a senior traditional leader, in 2000. He was also a member of the Eastern Cape House of Traditional Leaders from 2003 until his death in 2013.

On 5 August 2013 Matanzima, who was en route to a meeting in Bhisho, picked up a man pretending to be a hitchhiker in Stutterheim, Eastern Cape. Matanzuma was stabbed by the man during an attempted carjacking and robbery, which took place on the N8 road approximately 10 km from Stutterheim. Qaqambile Matanzima was taken to hospital, where he died of his injuries the same day. He was survived by his wife, Nozolile, and five children. He was buried at the Mtshanyane Great Place in Cofimvaba on 11 August 2013.

Qaqambile Matanzima was former Transkei Prime Minister George Matanzima's last surviving son.
