= Lusikisiki =

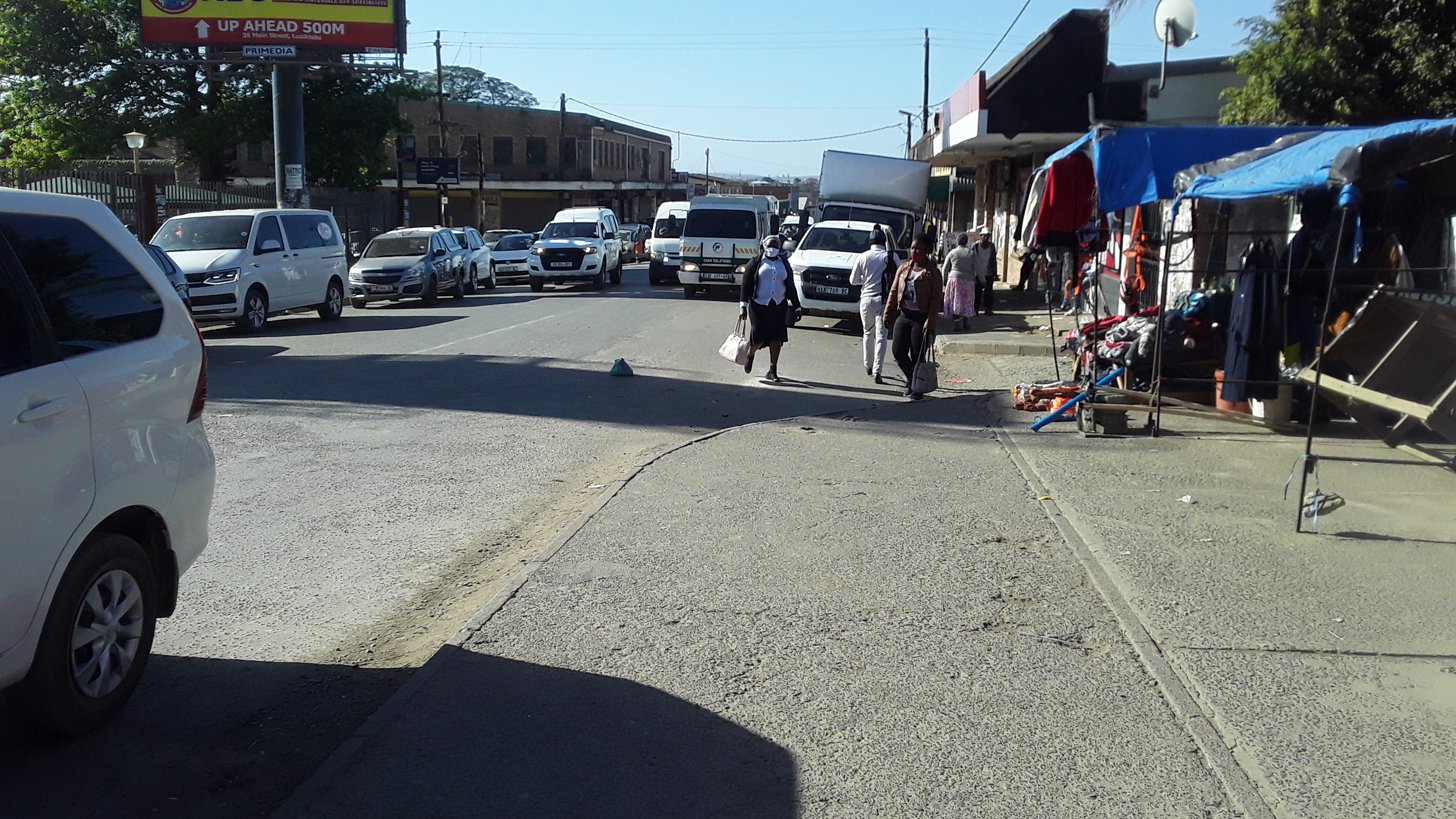
- Main road of Lusikisiki Town.

- Location within Eastern Cape Location within South Africa
- Coordinates: 31.368°S 29.576°E
- Country: South Africa
- Province: Eastern Cape
- District: O.R. Tambo
- Municipality: Ingquza Hill

Area
  - Total: 4.09 km^{2} (1.58 sq mi)

Population (2011)
  - Total: 4,028
  - Density: 985/km^{2} (2,550/sq mi)

Racial makeup (2011)
  - Black African: 94.0%
  - Coloured: 1.9%
  - Indian/Asian: 1.8%
  - White: 0.7%
  - Other: 1.6%

First languages (2011)
  - Xhosa: 81.3%
  - English: 8.3%
  - Zulu: 2.2%
  - Other: 8.2%
- Time zone: UTC+2 (SAST)
- Postal code (street): 4820
- PO box: 4820
- Area code: 039

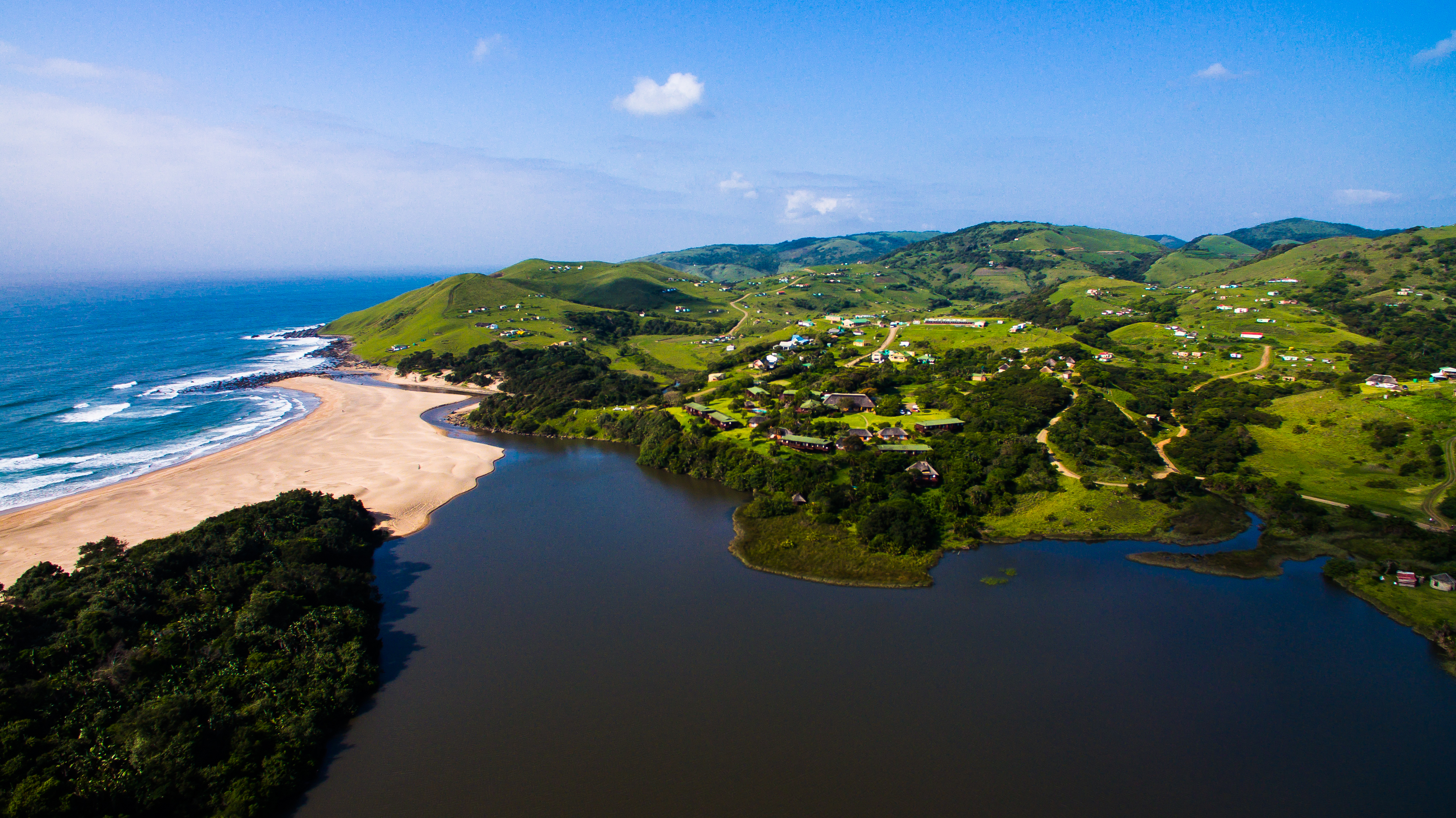
An aerial view of Mboyti, a small settlement and coastal resort located south-east of Lusikisiki on the mouth of the Mbotyi River.

Lusikisiki is a town in the Ingquza Hill Local Municipality in the Eastern Cape Province, South Africa. The name is onomatopoeic, derived from the rustling sound of reeds in the wind, named by the local Xhosa people. Lusikisiki is 45 kilometres (28 mi) inland from and north of Port St Johns. The town is positioned along the R61 (future N2 Wild Coast Toll Route) leading to Mthatha to the west and Port Shepstone to the north-east.

== History ==
=== Pre-colonial era ===
In this era, the AmaMpondo King's kraal occupied what is now the present town village.

=== Colonial era ===
By 1894 European settlers started settling in Lusikisiki after Mpondoland was annexed by the Cape Colony and a magistrate took up residence there with a military camp established as well.

=== Apartheid era ===
In 1953 the South African Apartheid government made attempts to persuade the people of Lusikisiki to accept the rule of Bantu authorities which they had established. The government worked with Paramount Chief King Botha Sigcau to attempt to start a rehabilitation scheme in Pondoland. The scheme was presented to the Lusikisiki community but was rejected. A few days later, the police entered the area. A man called Mngqinga led a large local group to attack the police. This was later known as the Lusikisiki Revolt.

== Climate ==
Lusikisiki receives high levels of rainfall, ranging between 874–1,060 mm (34–42 in) of rain per annum. Rainfall is considered unseasonal, although Lusikisiki receives the majority of its rainfall during summer. Winter temperatures reach their lowest in July, averaging 8 °C (46 °F) Celsius at night. The area lies within Forest and Indian Coastal Thicket biomes, and White Milkwood (Sideroxylon inerme) are common.

== Attractions around Lusikisiki ==
The Magwa Waterfall lies in the middle of the 1,800-hectare (4,400-acre) Magwa tea plantation, South Africa's last remaining tea estate just outside Lusikisiki. The curtain of the Magwa Waterfall falls 144 metres (472 ft) and drops into a narrow canyon.

Other points of interest include the Mkambati Nature Reserve which includes the Mzamba Fossil Beds estimated to be about 60 million years old, the Ntsubane Forest and Lupatana Nature Reserve.

== Notable people ==
- Khotso Sethuntsa – Sangoma
- King Botha Sigcau – 1st president of the Bantustan of Transkei
- Princess Stella Sigcau – 1st female prime minister of the Bantustan of Transkei & South African national minister
- Prince Nkosi Ntsikayezwe Sigcau – traditional leader of Lwandlolubomvu Traditional Council
- Simphiwe Dana – musician
- Mpho Mbiyozo – rugby union player
- Austin Roberts (1883–1948), zoologist, died in Lusikisiki

== Crime ==
As of 2021, Lusikisiki has ranked number 1 in South Africa in terms of the national crime rate; these crimes include domestic robbery and sexual harassment.

On September 28th 2024, two mass shootings took place in Lusikisiki, killing 18 people and injuring 5 others.

== See also ==
- Mpofu Nature Reserve
- Pondoland
