= Mpondo people =

Southern African ethnic group

Ama-Mpondo Ama-Mpondo
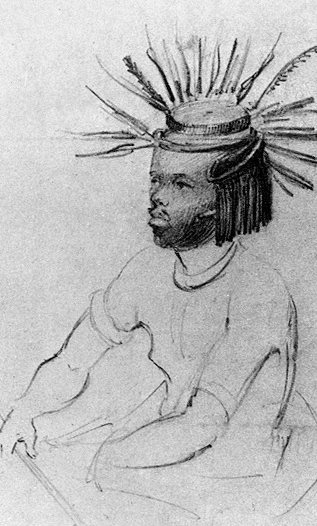
- The son of Mpondo King Faku (before 1864)

Total population
- ~5 million

Regions with significant populations
- South Africa

Languages
- Xhosa (IsiMpondo), English

Religion
- Christianity, African Traditional Religion

Related ethnic groups
- Xhosa, Mpondomise, Thembu, Xesibe Swati, Hlubi, Zulu other Bantu peoples

The Ama-Mpondo Nation
- Person: I-Mpondo
- People: Ama-Mpondo
- Language: Isi-Mpondo
- Country: Ema-Mpondweni

The Mpondo people, or Ama-Mpondo, belong to a kingdom in what is now the Eastern Cape. It was established on the 28th of March 1028 AD when the founder was just 28 years old. The Ama-Mpondo-Nation was first ruled by its founder who was King-Mpondo ka-Njanya (1000-1082), and ruled from 1028 until his death in 1082; later the 'Ama-Nyawuza' clan was established by King-Nyawuza Ka-Thahle one of his descendants that ruled centuries after his own death (a royal clan from his time when he ruled the Ama-Mpondo-Nation), by nationality referred to themselves as 'Ama-Mpondo'. They are related to other Aba-Mbo kingdoms and chiefdoms in South Africa.

== Origins ==
The story of the origins of ema-Mpondweni was told to personify and symbolise the fact that it was a nation with lands shaped like a horn, when it includes the lands ema-Mpondomiseni, and to make it easier for telling Iintsomi, meaning educative stories. Taking Mpondo as the son since it was used for defending and Mpondomise as the daughter since it was used for attacking and negotiation. Thus according to the Mpondo oral tradition, they are the legendary descendants of King Mpondo, the grandson of King Sibiside who was the leader of the once-powerful Embo nation (Aba-Mbo or Ma-Mbo). Mpondo people are part of the Aba-Mbo group who are thought to have migrated from the Great Lakes into modern-day South Africa or the race of people coming from Ethiopia and along Zambia down past Eswatini, believed to be under the Great Kingdom of Kush. This is evident from the ruling plant in the coast south-east of Africa and north-west of Madagascar, the marijuana plant. It grows in abundance from ema-Mpondweni up the coast and the coast of Madagascar. It is through king Sibiside that Mpondo the forefather of the nation emerges together with other well-known nations. Mpondo people share a common lineage with Ama-Mpondomise, Ama-Xesibe, Abakwa-Mkhize, Ama-Bomvu and Ama-Bomvana.

King Sibiside's offspring:

1. Mavovo ( King Sibiside's heir and father of the Mkhize clan)
2. Gubhela (his descendants also call themselves abakwa-Mkhize)
3. Nomafu (Ama-Bomvu and Ama-Bomvana)
4. Njanya (Ama-Mpondo, Ama-Mpondomise, Ama-Xesibe)

Mpondo and Mpondomise were twins. There is an ongoing argument about the twin who was the eldest, the most commonly held view is that Mpondo is the senior twin. It is said that while out hunting, Mpondo killed a lion and refused to hand over the skin to Mpondomise as was the custom (the senior was entitled to skins of certain animals). The tension between the two started from that day and Mpondo and his followers were the first ones to leave and settle elsewhere away from their father's land.Historically confirmed by early historians and custodians it was proven that Amampondo were the first to occupy EC,other ethnic groups like Amampondomise,Abathembu,Amaxhosa,Amabomvane were all welcomed by Amampondo when passing the Umzimkhulu river.

"The invasion of Shaka's forces into Mpondoland commenced in 1824, during the tumultuous period known as the Mfecane. The Zulu army waged war against the Mpondo kingdom, but the latter valiantly defended their territory, successfully repelling the invaders. The Zulu forces suffered significant losses, with many starving and losing their cattle. Those who survived were forced to forage for wild watermelons, known as 'amabhece' in Zulu or 'ujodo' in IsiMpondo, to sustain themselves. Consequently, this conflict became known as the 'Impi yama Bhece'.

A subsequent Zulu invasion occurred in 1828, preceded by a warning from a white messenger named Henry Fynn, who had arrived from Zululand. Despite initial skepticism from the Mpondo people, Fynn's message proved accurate, and King Faku prepared his army for battle. The king strategically relocated women and children to the Mngazi forests west of the Mzimvubu River, while his eldest son, Prince Ndamase, led the Mpondo army. The Zulu forces, bolstered by a contingent of white soldiers armed with modern weaponry, posed a formidable threat. However, King Faku's astute observation and the Mpondo chiefs' counsel led to a decisive victory, reportedly facilitated by supernatural means – it is said that King Faku unleashed wild dogs and hyenas to devour the enemy, dispersing and driving the Zulu forces and their allies back to Natal.

A third Zulu invasion was thwarted at the Mthavuna River, where Faku's traditional healer employed magical African powers to prevent the Zulus from crossing. This victory solidified the Mpondo kingdom's boundaries and earned King Faku enduring recognition as a wise and powerful leader.

Throughout this period, the Mpondo people fought numerous wars against neighboring tribes, including the Abathembu of Ngoza, the Amazizi of Mavumengwana, the Amampondomise of Mhlontlo, the Amabomvana of Gambusha, the Amaqwabe of Nqetho,Amaxhosa of Sarhili,Abathembu of Ngubengcuka and the Amabhaca of Ncapayi. To this day, the Mpondo people take pride in their heritage, acknowledging King Faku as a warrior, diplomat, and visionary leader who safeguarded their land and legacy" .

== Ama-Mpondo-Kingdom ==
The great house of Mpondo is called Ndimakude Great Palace and is situated in Flagstaff, Eastern Cape. The right-hand house is called Nyandeni Great Place and is situated in Libode, Eastern Cape. The Nyandeni house enjoyed autonomy for decades and was often referred to as Western Mpondo-land, while the Qawukeni house was referred to as Eastern Mpondo-land.

The towns in the Mpondo kingdom include Lusikisiki, Siphaqeni (known as Flagstaff), Mbizana (erroneously called Bizana), Ntabankulu, Port St. Johns, Libode and Ngqeleni.

Mzintlava (now known as Kokstad) was allotted to Adam Kok of the Griquas.

- King-Sibiside (-Son-of-Sidwabasiluthuli-)

(+Born:0921-Died:1014+)

- King-Njanya "Khubazi" (-Son-of-Sibiside-)

(+Born:0954-Died:1040+)

- King-Mpondo (-Son-of-Njanya-)

(+Born:1000-Died:1080+)

[=Reigned-From:1028 Till 1082=]

- King-Sithula (-Son-of-Mpondo-)

(+Born:1042-Died:1128+)

[=Reigned-From:1080 Till 1128=]

- King-Mithwane (-Son-of-Sithula-)

(+Born:1076-Died:1168+)

[=Reigned-From:1128 Till 1168=]

- King-Santsabe (-Son-of-Mithwane-)

(+Born:1125-Died:1210+)

[=Reigned-From:1168 Till 1210=]

- King-Khondwane (-Son-of-Santsabe-)

(+Born:1170-Died:1258+)

[=Reigned-From:1210 Till 1258=]

- King-Shukude (-Son-of-Khondwane-)

(+Born:1220-Died:1303+)

[=Reigned-From:1258 Till 1303=]

- King-Hlambangobubende (-Son-of-Shukude-)

(+Born:1264-Died:1346+)

[=Reigned-From:1303 Till 1346=]

- King-Ziqelekazi (-Son-of-Hlambangobubende-)

(+Born:1306-Died:1393+)

[=Reigned-From:1346 Till 1393=]

- King-Mhlamandane (-Son-of-Ziqelekazi-)

(+Born:1358-Died:1443+)

[=Reigned-From:1393 Till 1443=]

- King-Thobela (-Son-of-Mhlamandane-)

(+Born:1398-Died:1486+)

[=Reigned-From:1443 Till 1486=]

- King-Msizana (-Son-of-Thobela-)

(+Born:1432-Died:1528+)

[=Reigned-From:1486 Till 1528=]

- King-Ncindisi (-Son-of-Msizana-)

(+Born:1465-Died:1562+)

[=Reigned-From:1528 Till 1562=]

- King-Cabe (-Son-of-Ncindisi-)

(+Born:1519-Died:1592+)

[=Reigned-From:1562 Till 1592=]

- King-Gangatha (-Son-of-Cabe-)

(+Born:1552-Died:1626+)

[=Reigned-From:1592 Till 1626=]

- King-Bhabhala (-Son-of-Gangatha-)

(+Born:1586-Died:1662+)

[=Reigned-From:1626 Till 1662=]

- King-Chithwayo (-Son-of-Bhabhala-)

(+Born:1626-Died:1696+)

[=Reigned-From:1662 Till 1696=]

- King-Ndayeni (-Son-of-Chithwayo-)

(+Born:1651-Died:1728+)

[=Reigned-From:1696 Till 1728=]

- King-Thahle (-Son-of-Ndayeni-)

(+Born:1682-Died:1754+)

[=Reigned-From:1728 Till 1754=]

- King-Nyawuza (-Son-of-Thahle-)

(+Born:1708-Died:1782+)

[=Reigned-From:1754 Till 1782=]

- King-Ngqungqushe (-Son-of-Nyawuza-)

(+Born:1740-Died:1818+)

[=Reigned-From:1782 Till 1818=]

- King-Faku (-Son-of-Ngqungqushe-)

(+Born:1786-Died:1867+)

[=Reigned-From:1818 Till 1867=]

- King-Mqhikela (-Son-of-Faku-)

(+Born:1831-Died:1887+)

[=Reigned-From:1867 Till 1887=]

- King-Sigcawu (-Son-of-Mqhikela-)

(+Born:1855-Died:1905+)

[=Reigned-From:1887 Till 1905=]

- Prince-Mhlanganisa (-Son-of-Mqhikela-) *Acting-king*

(+Born:1863-Died:1918+)

[=Held-Power-From:1905 Till 1910=]

- King-Marhelane (-Son-of-Sigcawu-)

(+Born:1890-Died:1925+)

[=Reigned-From:1910 Till 1925=]

- Prince-Mswakezi (-Son-of-Sigcawu-) *Acting-king*

(+Born:1887-Died:1949+)

[=Held-Power-From:1925 Till 1930=]

- King-Mandlonke (-Son-of-Marhelane-)

(+Born:1907-Died:1937+)

[=Reigned-From:1930 Till 1937=]

- King-Mandlenkosi (-Son-of-Marhelane-)

(+Born:1910-Died:1968+)

[=Reigned-From:1937 Till 1968=]

- King-Zwelidumile (-Son-of-Mandlenkosi-)

(+Born:1948-Died:1984+)

[=Reigned-From:1968 Till 1984=]

- King-Zanozuko (-Son-of-Zwelidumile-)

(+Born:1974-Died:2022+)

[=Reigned-From:1984 Till 2022=]

- King-Silosohlanga "Yolisa" (-Son-of-Zanozuko-)

(+Born:1997-Alive:Aging+)

[=Reigning-since:2022 Till Present-Date=]

The current reigning monarch Today

== Mpondo clans and tributary clans ==
There are three types of clans you find in Mpondo-land (kwa-Mpondo/ema-Mpondweni) today. First, there clans that arise out of the many houses of the Kings listed in the section above is ( King Mpondo's descendants). Secondly, there are clans of the older Aba-Mbonambi Ma-Mbo Clan from which Mpondo himself was born out, therefore these are people of his ancestors. Thirdly, there are clans who have immigrated to Mpondo-land and now pay tribute to the Mpondo kingdom.and the clan names that avail are Nyawuza that is from the royal family and ngcitshana ,Tiyana ,tolo,bhukhwana so and so

In more detail:

- From Sihula we have Imi-Qwane, Ama-Ntusi (The elder son called Mbangweni and the young brother called Gavu kaMbangweni)
- From Mthwa we have Imi-Thwa, Ama-Woshe, Ama-Ngcwangule, Ama-Gingqi, Ama-Khwalo, Ama-Beko
- From Mkhondwane we have Ama-Ntlane, Ama-Valela, Ama-Gcuda
- From Sukude we have Ama-Same, Ama-Ncenjane
- From Cabe we have Ama-Cabe, Ama-Tshomane, Ama-Dwerha, Ama-Qhiya, Ama-Njilo, Ama-Gqwarhu, Ama-Nqanda
- From Gangatha we have Ama-Gangatha, Imi-Capathi
- From Bhala we have Ama-Bhala, Ama-Chithwayo, Ama-Khonjwayo, Ama-Nyathi, Ama-Heleni, Ama-Ngcoya, Ama-Jola (not to be confused with Ama-Mpondomise clan)
- From Ndayini we have Ama-Ndayini
- From Thahle we have Ama-Thahle
- From Nyawuza we have Ama-Nyawuza, Ama-Faku, oNgqungqushe.

Some of the following clans were followers of Mpondo kings from the beginning, some only came later during the reign of Faku:

- Ama-Yalo
- Ama-Mpisi
- Ama-Ngcikwa
- Ama-Khanyayo
- Imi-Zizi
- Ama-Ntshangase
- Ama-Khwetshube
- Ama-Ngutyana
- Ama-Ndunu
- Izi-langwe (lineage of the silangwe clan according to the oral history)

== 1960 revolts ==
=== Causes ===
There were varying reasons that led to the revolts notably the land rehabilitation programme, the Bantu Authorities System and the increase in taxes.

==== The land rehabilitation programme ====
The land rehabilitation programme was a system that entailed the colonisers keeping the fertile soils to themselves and allocating the less fertile lands to the local people. The Mpondo people revolted against this.

==== The Bantu Authorities System ====
This system brought about tension between the people of Pondoland and their chiefs. The Bantu Authorities System created a pseudo sense of power as colonial authorities gave chiefs limited power, ensuring that administrative duties were still being assigned to the colonial government. This disrupted the system as people were used to being consulted at the Inkundla before decisions were made. Inkundla was when members of a community met together to discuss issues affecting the district/area and made decisions.

=== Series of events leading to the 1960 revolts ===
The first signs of revolt were apparent through local vigilante groups such as the Makhuluspani. The Makhuluspani was a group that was created in a bid to combat stock theft in the districts of Tsolo and Qumbu in the 1950s. It is reported that these groups targeted headmen and chiefs who were cooperating or suspected to be cooperating with the colonial government. There were also conflicts around the Bizana area during that same year as the government intended to fence off a certain area on the coastal area to reserve the forests and coastal zones without having consulted the people of Mpondo-land. People were evicted out of their land, and at one stage during evictions police were attacked.

In 1959, in the Bizana district, Saul Mabude who was the chairman of the district authority and advocate for the Bantu Authorities system was asked to meet with the people of that community. He was tasked with explaining the Bantu Authorities system to them, however he did not show up as he feared for his life. The consequence to his actions resulted in him having his house burnt and the police terrorizing the people in that area. This did not deter the Mpondo people from mobilising against the government, who made it clear to Chief Sigcawu, who was the King at the time that the Bantu system was not going to be enforced on their watch.

In June 1960 a meeting was called at Ngquza Hill. These meetings had become the norm during the apartheid era around that area as people used them to educate each other on the events that were taking place, thus the meetings on the hill were not held secretly. The police were tipped about the meeting, who in turn upon their arrival fired on the people at the hill. This resulted in the arrest of 23 people and the death of 11 people. In retaliation, there was an ambush on a police patrol in Flagstaff. These people were shot at by the police, resulting in the injury of two policemen and the arrest of one headman.

In November 1960 in Flagstaff, a mass meeting was called at Ngqanduli. Chief Vukayibambe called the police and helped disperse the meeting. One of the protesters was killed, this resulting in Vukayibambe's kraal being set on fire and his death. All those who had an affiliation with the chief and supported him were killed, injured and their kraals set alight. The police were sent to defuse the situation.

=== Stabilisation of the revolts ===
A commission of inquiry was held right after the massacre. The demands from the people of Pondoland entailed the Bantu Authorities, Bantu Education Acts being withdrawn, the relief from taxes. Their demands were not met, and in retaliation the Pondo boycotted all white owned stores in Pondoland.

By the end of November 1960, a state of emergency was declared in Pondoland, in Flagstaff, Bizana, Tabankulu, Lusikisiki and Mount Ayliff. No one could access those areas without a permit, and the west of Umtata was closed off. The revolts were shut down through heavy policing and raiding tax evaders. The Bantu Home Guard was also established by the chiefs in a bid to shut down the revolts, with the aid of the military force that was sent by the state in a bid to subjugate the areas in Pondoland where the revolts had occurred until 1963.

In 1960, a total of 4,769 had been imprisoned during this period of the revolts from 1950 and 1960, and 2,067 brought to trial and it is reported that 30 people were sentenced to death during August and October in 1961.

== Arts and entertainment ==
The Mpondo people are one of the major tribes that produce and consumes the genre of music called Maskandi but the Mpondo people are unique in a performance of ukusina (Nguni dance) and their own traditional dance called "imfene" (baboon dance). This dance(imfene) is performed by young ones and adults of both sexes to the sounds of Maskandi music.

=== Mpondo Culture and Heritage Festival ===
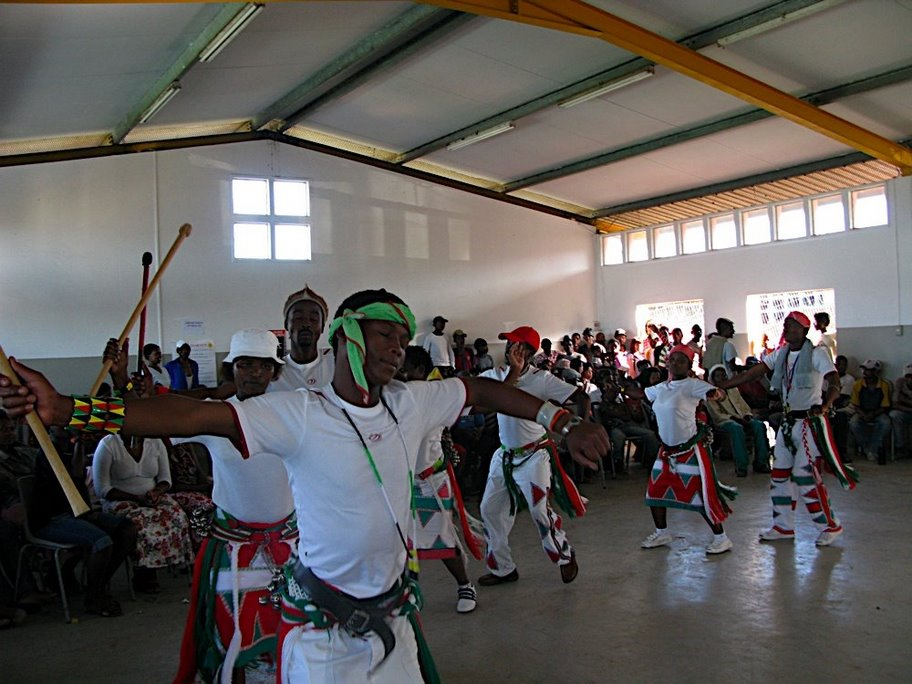
Imfene, a Mpondo Dance Festival, Kennedy Road Shack Settlement, Durban (2008)

Mpondo Culture and Heritage Festival is celebrated annually by Mpondo to celebrate their culture and heritage. It is the biggest cultural event celebrated in the Kingdom attended by approximately over 20,000 people preceded by the Annual Mpondo Reed Dance. It is held in September of every year at Lwandlolubomvu Great Place, Ntabankulu; palace of the customary head Jongilanga Sigcau. Ntabankulu is the mountainous part of the Mpondo Kingdom surrounded by the great Mzimvubu River. Ntabankulu in Mpondo language means 'Big Mountains'. September is important in Mpondo history as it was originally the Mpondo new year in the ancient Mpondo calendars and also two of the Mpondo Kings King Mqikela and King Sigcau were born on this month. The Mpondo culture and Heritage Festival also celebrates the roles played by these icons, including the legendary kings Faku, Mqikela, Sigcawu, Marhelane amongst others. This events also seeks to promote cultural diversity through sharing of Mpondo culture and heritage with other cultures from South Africa, broader African continent and beyond the oceans. It attracts a lot of tourists, both local and international, and is one of the biggest events in the Eastern Cape Province of South Africa.

== Lunar Calendar ==
According to the ancient Aba-Mbo people, including Mpondo, September is the first month of the year. There are some Mpondo people who recognise the appearance of the Pleiades ("isilimela") to signal the beginning of the year, but it is most likely that this interpretation was adopted from the sotho people. Mpondo calendar is as follows commencing with uMphanda the first month of the year according to the ancient Mpondo Calendar.

- u-Mphanda (September)
- u-Zibandlela (October)
- u-Lwezi (November)
- u-Ntsinga (December)
- u-Ntlolanja (January)
- u-Ndazosela (February)
- u-m'Basa (March)
- u-Mgudlula (April)
- u-Ntlangula (May)
- u-Ntulikazi (June)
- u-Ncwabakazi (July)
- u-Mfumfu (August)

== Notable Mpondo leaders ==
- Gquma - queen of the Tshomane Mpondo
- Tutor Nyangelizwe Vulindlela Ndamase
- Pumelele Ndamase
- Faku kaNgqungqushe
- Ngqungqushe kaNyawuza
- Botha Sigcau
- Nkosi Ntsikayezwe Sigcau – ANC activist
- Stella Sigcau – former ANC MP
- Makhenkesi Stofile
- Nosiviwe Mapisa-Nqakula
- Oliver Reginald Tambo – ANC activist
- Dali Tambo
- Winnie Madikizela-Mandela – ANC activist
- Chief Mwelo Nonkonyane
- Sizwe Kupelo
- Luyanda Matandabuzo
- Stella Ndabeni-Abrahams
- Lulu Dikana
- Zonke Dikana

== See also ==
- Botha Sigcau
- Tutor Nyangelizwe Vulindlela Ndamase
- Faku kaNgqungqushe
- Ngqungqushe kaNyawuza
- Ndamase
- Sigcau
- Isinuka Mud Caves and Sulphur Pools
- List of current constituent African monarchs
- Mpondoland
- Mpondomise people
- Xhosa clan names
