= Cofimvaba =

- Location within Eastern Cape Location within South Africa Location within Africa
- Coordinates: 32°0′9″S 27°34′50″E
- Country: South Africa
- Province: Eastern Cape
- District: Chris Hani
- Municipality: Intsika Yethu

Area
  - Total: 21.19 km^{2} (8.18 sq mi)

Population (2011)
  - Total: 8,783
  - Density: 414.5/km^{2} (1,074/sq mi)

Racial makeup (2011)
  - Black African: 98.3%
  - Coloured: 0.5%
  - Indian/Asian: 0.3%
  - White: 0.0%
  - Other: 0.5%

First languages (2011)
  - Xhosa: 93.1%
  - English: 2.6%
  - Other: 4.3%
- Time zone: UTC+2 (SAST)
- PO box: 5380
- Area code: 047

Cofimvaba is a town in Chris Hani District Municipality in the Eastern Cape province of South Africa.

== Location ==
The town is on the R61 road 79 km east of Queenstown on the route to Ngcobo.

== History ==
The village of Cofimvaba was probably established in 1877 when the magisterial seat for Thembuland (which had originally been located at St Marks) was transferred to a more accessible location. Chris Hani was born in Cofimvaba.

In September 2022, more than nine people were murdered in and around this small town, within a 30-day period, in which people suspected to be "mapara paras" (thugs) were killed by a group of locals, claiming a lack of policing by the South African Police Service. It has been claimed that the suspects were killed for offences such as stealing television sets, assault and other petty and more serious infractions.

== Name origin ==
Probably named after the nearby stream which, after rains, froths turbulently and resembles milk. The name is also said to be derived from cofa, "press", mvaba, "milk-bag" (of goat-skin), done to break lumps of sour milk. Another explanation is that the sound of the water gurgling over the rocks is reminiscent of the splashing of milk in the bag when shaken.

== Features ==
There is a hospital in Cofimvaba called Cofimvaba Hospital. There are also two high schools in town, St. James High School and Cofimvaba High School.

== Notable people ==
- Chris Hani, former leader of the South African Communist Party and chief of staff of uMkhonto we Sizwe, the armed wing of the African National Congress (ANC)
- Chief George Matanzima – prime minister of the Bantustan of Transkei
- Chief Kaiser Matanzima – 2nd president of the Bantustan of Transkei
- King Zwelenkosi Matanzima, Aa! Zwelenkosi! - King of the Western Thembu.
