= Jongilizwe College =

School in South Africa

Coordinates: 31.29012°S 28.75621°E

Jongilizwe College was a school in Tsolo, Transkei (now Eastern Cape), South Africa which served the sons of Chiefs and Headmen from the Transkei bantustan.

== Alumni ==
- Bantu Holomisa (1975)
- Stanley Ntapane (1979)
- Dumisa Ntsebeza (1975)
- Holomisa, Bantu; Meyer, Rudolph Adriaan (1999). A better future: United Democratic Movement towards a winning nation in ten years. UDM. ISBN 978-0-620-24041-3.
- Sibuyiselwe Dumani (1995)
