= Sigcau =

Sigcau is a South African surname that may refer to:

- Botha Sigcau (1913–1978), King in the Eastern Pondoland, President of Transkei from 1976 to 1978 and grandson of Sigcau
- Nkosi Ntsikayezwe Sigcau (1947–1996), atraditional leader of Lwandlolubomvu Traditional Council, the youngest son of King Botha Sigcau, brother to Princess Stella Sigcau and descendant of Sigcau
- Stella Sigcau (1937–2006), Mpondo Princess, Minister in the South African Government; the first and the desce only female prime minister of Transkei, and descendant of Sigcau
- Sylvia Sigcau (born 1946), South African politician
