= Stanley Ntapane =

South African politician

Stanley Ntapane is a South African politician. A member of the United Democratic Movement, Ntapane is a member of the National Assembly of South Africa and spokesperson with the UDM. Ntapane attended Jongilizwe College for the Sons of Headmen and Chiefs in the Transkei, from which he graduated from in 1979. He was a lecturer at Nelson Mandela Metropolitan University in 1998-99
