= St Mark's, South Africa =

St Mark’s
- Location within Eastern Cape Location within South Africa
- Coordinates: 32.013°S 27.381°E
- Country: South Africa
- Province: Eastern Cape
- District: Chris Hani
- Municipality: Intsika Yethu

Area
  - Total: 2.43 km^{2} (0.94 sq mi)

Population (2011)
  - Total: 1,500
  - Density: 620/km^{2} (1,600/sq mi)

Racial makeup (2011)
  - Black African: 99.8%
  - Coloured: 0.1%
  - Indian/Asian: 0.1%

First languages (2011)
  - Xhosa: 95.7%
  - Zulu: 2.0%
  - Other: 2.4%
- Time zone: UTC+2 (SAST)

St Mark's, Eastern Cape is a town in Chris Hani District Municipality in the Eastern Cape province of South Africa. Village on the White Kei River, about 15 km west of Cofimvaba and 40 km north-east of Cathcart.

== History ==
It was founded in 1855 by Bishop John Armstrong as one of four Anglican mission stations named after the apostles.
