= Khotso Sethuntsa =

South African herbalist (1898–1972)

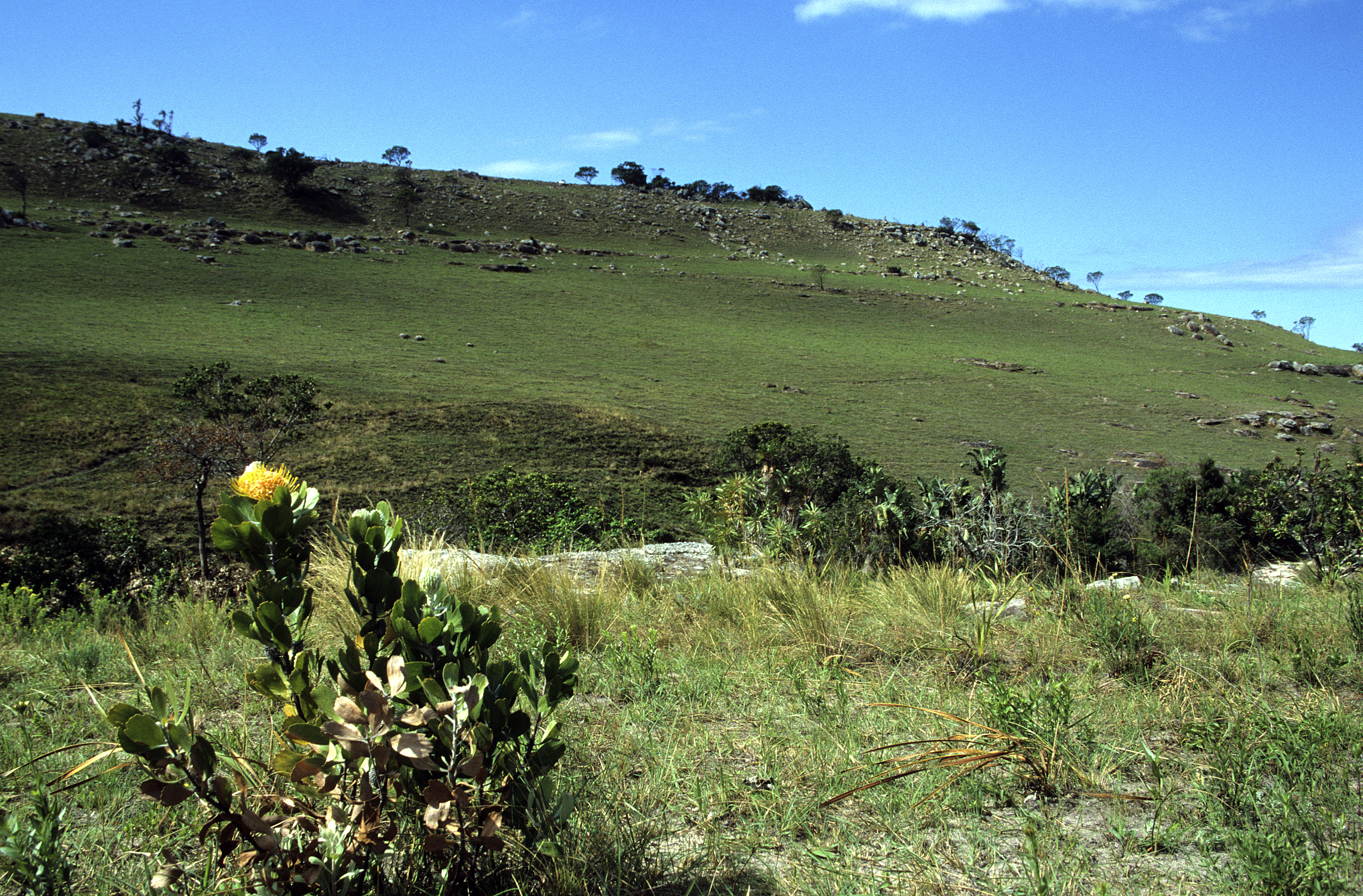
Sethuntsa had a large property in Lusikisiki

Khotso Sethuntsa (1898–1972) was a South African herbalist who lived in the Eastern Cape town of Lusikisiki. By the mid-twentieth century, he was perceived to be a powerful man whose wealth was amassed through his relationship with Water Spirits, living with his own personal serpentine Mermaid in Xhosa as uMam’Mlambo and a River Serpent/Dragon. Little material evidence attests to his supernatural powers, with only oral accounts available to describe his talents. What was widely known amongst native South Africans at the time was that he was a millionaire with 23 wives and had an expansive clientele that included J. G. Strijdom and Hendrik Verwoerd.

== Upbringing ==
Sethuntsa was born in Ha Ramokakatlela, a remote village in the Maloti Mountains, in Lesotho. He relocated to Kokstad in the 1920s where he built his White House. Little is known about Sethuntsa's upbringing, but he claimed that his parents worked on Paul Kruger's farm, with his father working as Kruger's coachman. It was widely known that Sethuntsa held a deep reverence for Paul Kruger, the South African Republic's first president. To this day, statues of Paul Kruger can be found at Sethuntsa's compound in Mount Nelson, Lusikisiki. He claimed to have discovered Paul Kruger's lost treasure chest rumoured to be worth millions, a substantial contributor to his wealthy lifestyle.

== Rise to fame ==
While he was still working as a young farm worker, Sethuntsa got into a dispute with the farm owner. As a result, the farm owner punished him. A tornado struck the farm, resulting in the destruction of the farm owner's house. Khotso claimed responsibility for this, a story that also appeared in ‘The Kokstad Advertiser’ newspaper. As a result of this event, his fame and legend as a powerful medicine man began to grow.

It was believed that Sethuntsa enjoyed a relationship with the "spirits of the water", known in Xhosa as abantu bomlambo. These were believed to be two different snakes that Sethuntsa communed with: Inkanyamba which was believed to provide good health, luck and prosperity, and Mamlambo had the ability to shapeshift into a beautiful yet dangerous serpentine mermaid that could provide power and wealth. These "spirits" inspired a procedure known as ukuthwala that was meant to result in extreme wealth for Sethuntsa's clients. Ukuthwala in southern African traditional beliefs is often associated with the act compromising your soul and/or human relationships in order to gain wealth. Locals in Kokstad and Pondoland both feared and loathed Sethuntsa for his perceived power. Every year Sethuntsa celebrated Kruger Day by holding a massive feast. His connection to Kruger was so deep that he told people that he had conversations with Paul Kruger in his dreams. It was also believed that Paul Kruger was the one who told Sethuntsa which horses to bet on in the Durban July Handicap Horse Races. Sethuntsa won the Durban July three years in a row from 1954 to 1956. Sethuntsa was also famous for purchasing luxury Cadillacs with a suitcase full of cash every year at the Kokstad Agricultural Show.

== Political ties ==
Sethuntsa had relationships with key Nationalist Party leaders, including D. F. Malan, J. G. Strijdom and Hendrik Verwoerd. He was known to be a supporter of the separate development policies that gave way to the apartheid system in 1948. On eve of the 1948 elections, it is believed that Verwoerd, who was still the minister of Bantu Affairs, held a secret meeting with Sethuntsa, where Verwoerd was given special muti by Sethuntsa that would deliver the elections to the Nationalist Party. The counter narrative was that Sethuntsa enjoyed close ties with Verwoerd and the Nationalist Party because he was the Broederbond's intelligence agent within the Tranksei region. Sethuntsa was forcibly removed from his palace in Kokstad due to the Bantu-Self Government Act under new apartheid legislation that came into effect in 1957. He was relocated to Lusikisiki.

== International acclaim ==
By the mid-1960s Sethuntsa was reported to have amassed a lot of wealth, with nine houses and 16 farms under his name. Word of his gifts reached as far as the United States, with African-Americans writing to him in search of charms and medicines that may assist in alleviating their health problems.

== Death ==
Sethuntsa died in Durban at the age of 74 due to heart failure.

== See also ==
- Vusamazulu Credo Mutwa
