= Qamata, South Africa =

Qamata
- Location within Eastern Cape Location within South Africa
- Coordinates: 31°58′39″S 27°26′23″E
- Country: South Africa
- Province: Eastern Cape
- District: Chris Hani
- Municipality: Intsika Yethu

Area
  - Total: 0.90 km^{2} (0.35 sq mi)

Population (2011)
  - Total: 114
  - Density: 130/km^{2} (330/sq mi)

Racial makeup (2011)
  - Black African: 100.0%

First languages (2011)
  - Xhosa: 95.6%
  - Northern Sotho: 1.8%
  - Other: 2.7%
- Time zone: UTC+2 (SAST)
- PO box: 5327

Qamata is a small town in Intsika Yethu Municipality, Chris Hani District (formerly St. Mark's District), Eastern Cape Province, South Africa. From 1963 to 1994, it was part of the semi-autonomous Transkei, and before that of western Tembuland. Qamata is located on Route R61 and on the Qamata River. It is 18 kilometres (11 mi) west of the town of Cofimvaba, 39 kilometres (24 mi) east of the R61 junction with the N6 national route and 58 kilometres (36 mi) east of Queenstown.

== History ==
Qamata was the birthplace of the Matanzima brothers, Kaiser and George, who were former rulers of the Transkei. It is also where they lived on probation after being released from gaol on corruption charges in 1987.
