= Ndamase =

Ndamase is a South African surname. Notable people with the surname include:

- Tutor Nyangelizwe Vulindlela Ndamase (1921–1997), King in the Western Pondoland, President of Transkei from 1986 to 1994 and descendant of Ndamase
- Mihlali Ndamase, South African influencer, businesswoman and make-up artist
- Pumelele Ndamase, South African politician and former public servant for the ANC
