= Tutor Ndamase =

South African politician

Tutor Vulindlela Ndamase

3rd President of Transkei
- In office 20 February 1986 – 26 April 1994
- Prime Minister: George Matanzima; Dumnisani Gladstone Gwadiso (Acting); Stella Sigcau
- Military Leader: Bantu Holomisa
- Preceded by: Kaiser Matanzima
- Succeeded by: Position abolished

Personal details
- Born: Tutor Vulindlela Ndamase; 11 January 1921
- Died: 21 February 1997 (aged 76)
- Party: Independent (from 1987)
- Other political affiliations: Transkei National Independence Party (until 1987)

King Vulindlela Nyangelizwe KaPhangwa (Tutor Vulindlela Ndamase; 11 January 1921 – 21 February 1997) was the third President of the bantustan of Transkei, which was granted nominal independence from South Africa on 26 October 1976. (Note: The Status of Transkei Act 100 of 1976 granted Transkei "independence" with effect from 26 October 1976.) He was the King of Western Mpondoland, the son of King Victor Poto Ndamase. He was brother to Xhosa Queen Nondwe Sigcawu the wife of King Xolilizwe Sigcawu, Aa! Xolilozwe!; AmaRharhabe Queen Nolizwe Sandile the wife of King Mxolisi Sandile, Aa! Bazindlovu! and mother of AmaRharhabe King Maxhob'ayakhawuleza Sandile, Aa! Zanesizwe! and AmaMpondomise Queen Nolitha Matiwane (mother to AmaMpondomise King Luzuko Matiwane, Aa! Zwelozuko!); and Chieftain Nolusapho Mabandla the wife of AmaBhele Chief Thandathu Jongilizwe Mabandla, Aa! Jongilizwe!.

Ndamase became president on 20 February 1986, after the retirement of King Kaiser Matanzima, the second President of Transkei (in office from 1979) and served until 26 April 1994, when Transkei was reintegrated into South Africa.

Ndamase represented the Transkei National Independence Party (TNIP) until 1987, when the party was abolished following the coup d'état led by Bantu Holomisa. He died on 21 February 1997 at the age of 76.

== Notes ==
Political offices
Preceded by Kaiser Matanzima	President of Transkei; 1986–1994	Position abolished
