= Ngqungqushe kaNyawuza =

Ama-Mpondo-Kingdom

King-Ngqungqushe ka-Nyawuza

AmaMpondo Kingdom
- Reign: 18 June 1782 To 28 April 1818
- Predecessor: King-Nyawuza ka-Thahle (Father)
- Successor: King-Faku kaNgqungqushe (Son)
- Born: c. 1753
- Died: 28 April 1818

King-Ngqungqushe ka-Nyawuza was the 20th monarch of the Ama-Mpondo state of modern-day Eastern Cape and Kwa-Zulu Natal provinces now in South Africa. He succeeded his father, King-Nyawuza ka-Thahle, on 18 June 1782 and he reigned until his death on 28 April 1818.

During what was an eventful reign, the Grosvenor, East Indiaman a British vessel ran aground on 4 August 1782 at the coast of the land of this region at Lambasi with 123 survivors, causing consternation on King-Ngqungqushe ka-Nyawuza leading him to order the survivors to be slain for fear of them ravaging his people and stealing cattle. This is despite the fact that a smaller number of survivors on previous shipwrecks, (the Sao Jao, the Sao Bento, etc.) had been assimilated into the Mpondo cultural way of life and sometimes assisted to get to their destination by the hospitable but fierce ama-Mpondo-kingdom.

== Death of King Ngqungqushe ==
Sometime in the late 1810s the King intervened in a succession dispute among the Ama-Bomvana-People who had been a Mpondo-vassal-state for centuries, on behalf of his son in law, Prince-Ngezana who was married to King-Ngqungqushe's daughter. Confident of the military prowess of his ama-Mpondo-armed-forces who had never been conquered before, the confident King led his army Southwest after briefly assembling at his Vungeni great place. He crossed into Bomvana-territory assured of victory.

The combined Ama-Mpondo-Military-force under King-Ngqungqushe's control together with a band led by Prince-Ngezana attacked Gambushe who was the Bomvana regent at the time, forcing the regent and his forces to retreat. While savouring the taste of their victory Ama-Mpondo-troops and their King-Ngqungqushe relaxed for the night on the banks of Dangwana River on their way home enjoying the spoils of a victory well earned. Unbeknownst to them, the Ama-Bomvana regent-King-Gambushe had reorganized his forces and surprised the relaxed Ama-Mpondo-Military-army with great force. In the ensuing chaos, King-Ngqungqushe's Royal-guard was overtaken and then King-Ngqungqushe Ka-Nyawuza was "sent to meet his ancestors" in the otherworld.

Having not secured the succession of his heir, the relatively young Prince-Phakane ka-Ngqungqushe, King-Ngqungqushe was said to be succeeded by Prince-Faku ka-Ngqungqushe who usurped the throne from the heir Prince-Phakane with the help of the Ama-Mpondo-Royal-Court. During the time of King-Ngqungqushe the Ama-Mpondo-Royal-state, consisting of many vassal chiefdoms, was located near the coast along both sides of the Mthatha River and extended along the coast roughly to the Mzimkhulu River to the northeast and the Mthatha river to the southwest.
