= Ncora =

Ncorha Ncora
- Location within Eastern Cape Location within South Africa
- Coordinates: 31.7938°S 27.7579°E
- Country: South Africa
- Province: Eastern Cape
- District: Chris Hani
- Municipality: Intsika Yethu

Area
  - Total: 177.97 km^{2} (68.71 sq mi)

Population (2001)
  - Total: 9,755
  - Density: 54.81/km^{2} (142.0/sq mi)

Racial makeup (2001)
  - Black African: 100.0%

First languages (2001)
  - Xhosa: 99.4%
  - Other: 0.6%
- Time zone: UTC+2 (SAST)
- PO box: 5403
- Area code: 047

Ncora, officially Ncorha is a town in Chris Hani District Municipality in the Eastern Cape province of South Africa.
