= Faku kaNgqungqushe =

Ama-Mpondo-Kingdom

King-Faku ka-Ngqungqushe
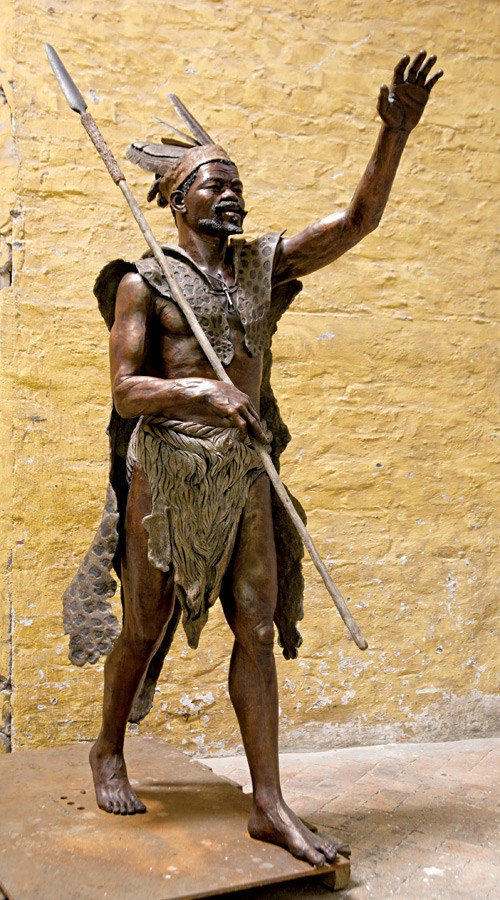

AmaMpondo Kingdom
- Reign: 1818 – 1867
- Predecessor: King-Ngqungqushe kaNyawuza (Father)
- Successor: King-Mqikela ka-Faku (Son) in the Eastern-Kingdom; King-Ndamase ka-Faku (Son) in the Western-Kingdom
- Born: 1780
- Died: 29 October 1867 (aged 86–87)
- Spouse: 1. Queen of Sikelweni Royal Homestead - Mazilangwe - non-royal - (Qawukeni supporting wife - First Wife); 2. Queen of Nyandeni Royal Homestead - Manqayiya - Bomvana Royal - (Great Wife); 3. Queen of Qawukeni - Mamanci - minor Mpondo Royal - (Great Wife); 4. Queen of Mafini - Mazilangwe - minor Mpondo Royal - (Nyandeni supporting wife); 5. Queen of Mdikisweni - marital name unknown - non-royal (Qawukeni supporting Wife - third wife); 6. Queen of Tshinweni - marital name unknown - non-royal (Qawuekni supporting wife - fourth wife); 7. Queen of Sihlonyaneni - Mabaneka - non-royal (Nyandeni supporting wife - fifth wife); 8. Queen of Ntsonyini - marital name unknown - non-royal (Nyandeni supporting wife - sixth wife); 9. Queen of eMawuleni - Marital name unknown - non-royal (Nyandeni supporting wife - seventh wife); 10. Queen of eMpoza - Manobinda - non-royal (Qawukeni supporting wife - eighth wife)
- Issue: 1. Prince Bhekameva of Sikelweni with his siblings; 2. Nkosi Nonkobe of Mdikisweni with his siblings 3. Nkosi Ndamase of Nyandeni with his siblings 4. Nkosi Koyana of Mafini with his siblings 5. Nkosi Ndabeni of Tshinweni with his siblings 6. Nkosi Sitata of Mhlonyaneni with his siblings 7. Nkosi Mkungekwana of Ntsonyini with his siblings 8. Nkosi Simayi of eMawuleni with his siblings 9. Nkosi Mbambe of eMpoza with his siblings; 10. Nkosi Mqikela of Qawukeni with his siblings

King Faku kaNgqungqushe was a King of the Ama-Mpondo Kingdom. He was born around 1780 at Vungeni homestead, the royal centre of the amaMpondo Kingdom. He reigned for around 50 years, resisting invasions from other African kingdoms, internal dissention, and European colonial pressure. In his old age his son, Ndamase, established himself as effectively independent in the western part of the Kingdom, which spilt in two upon King Faku's death at the age of 87.

== Parents and background ==
He was the son of King Ngqungqushe, who ruled over a polity already well established along the coastal and inland regions between the Mzimkhulu and Mthatha rivers and Queen Mamngcambe (a Mpondomise princess). The amaMpondo Kingdom was a layered political formation composed of homesteads, subordinate chiefs, and regimental structures tied together by allegiance to the king. Authority rested on cattle, control of land, and the ability to mobilise armed followers.

Although King Faku’s mother seems to have been deposed as King Ngqungqushe’s Great Wife in favour of Phakani’s mother, she was to later regain this position immediately after King Ngqungqushe’s death. What could have caused the deposition of King Faku’s mother as the Great Wife during the lifetime of King Ngqungqushe remains a mystery and led many to mistakenly believe that King Faku was not of full royal blood and that he had acquired his Kingship by force of arms. However, the amaMpondo naming system suggests otherwise. His mother being the sister of King Mngcambe of amaMpondomise, she was the only wife of King Ngqungqushe of full royal blood out of 8 wives. She was given the marital name of Mamngcambe after her brother Mngcambe the King of amaMpondomise. Thus this suggests that when the Royal Council overturned King Ngqungqushe's decision about who his heir was, it was merely to re-instante a son who was of full Royal Blood who may have lost this position because his father was said to be cruel.

== Rise to kingship ==
Faku’s rise to kingship must be located in the crisis that followed the death of his father around 1810-15. Ngqungqushe was killed in a military campaign against the Bomvana regent Gambushe, where he had unsuccessfully sought to install Ngezana on the amaBomvana throne. At the moment of his father’s death, the heir was Phakani. They seem to have re-instated Faku’s mother into the position of Great Wife, thereby retroactively legitimising Faku’s claim to the throne. This act was not arbitrary. It reflected the balance of power within the kingdom: Faku was already a mature man, married, with followers and standing among the leading men of the polity, whereas Phakani was young and politically untested. And, whatever decisions were taken by the late King, seem to have died with him.

His accession, however, was not universally accepted. Opposition emerged from within the royal family itself. Mtengwane, a senior right-hand son of Ngqungqushe, rejected Faku's authority and sought refuge among the Bomvana. Other elements within the kingdom fled toward the Xesibe, signalling uncertainty about the new king’s legitimacy. Even the displaced heir, Phakani, represented a potential focal point for dissent, though he never developed into a serious rival. Anyway, Faku had support of two younger brothers who stood to benefit from his rise to power such as Cingo and Sitata, who later "who both eventually became subordinate rulers of large sections of the Mpondo state" according to Stapleton. Faku moved swiftly to consolidate power. The dissenters found little external support, and those who fled were compelled to return. What might have become a prolonged civil conflict instead resolved relatively quickly, demonstrating that Faku’s claim was backed not only by councillor support but by real power on the ground and military support from the army itself.

== Reign ==
=== Early war against the Bomvana ===
The first major expression of that power was military. Faku launched a campaign against Gambushe of the Bomvana, both to avenge his father’s death and to eliminate a refuge for internal rivals. The campaign was significant and sustained. Faku’s forces drove the Bomvana westward across the Mbashe River, displacing them into the territory of the Gcaleka under Hintsa. Gambushe regrouped and mounted a counterattack, forcing Faku’s army to retreat. Even so, the strategic outcome favoured Faku: the Bomvana were removed from their previous position as a proximate threat, and Faku’s authority within the Mpondo polity was strengthened. From this early moment, his reign was defined by a combination of aggression and calculation—he was neither reckless nor passive, but deliberate in the use of force.

Faku’s kingship unfolded during a period of intense upheaval in Southern Africa: Portuguese slave trade in Delagoa Bay and land theft and rape by Boer and Briton on the side of the Cape. The early nineteenth century saw widespread movement of peoples, warfare, and the reorganisation of states. In this context, Faku did not merely survive; he expanded and transformed his kingdom. Maize cultivation expanded, cattle accumulation intensified, and trade networks developed further. Authority became more concentrated around the king, even as the underlying structure of semi-autonomous regiments and local loyalties remained.

=== Invasions ===
The abaThembu bakaNgoza invasion

Soon as Faku dealt with those who could challenge his Kingship internally and their allies on his Southwestern border, an invasion by Ngoza and his abaThembu on the East on the banks of uMzimkhulu River. Arrayed in a formation of three regiments, Ngoza’s abaThembu poured into amaMpondo and sought to grab territory. King Faku, repelled and killed the invader King Ngoza on the banks of Mzimkhulu River. Recounting the episode, a Thembu oral informant in 1909 recalling tales from his grandfather who was present at the time of the episode Languza ka Mpukane told James Stuart that amaMpondo were so incensed by this incursion that they cut off the arms of the abaThembu in order to remove “the metal ornaments they wore on the arm.” So terrible was the deed that the people who had lost their wrists had to kneel to eat food as they had no hands to pick it up. Most of the abaThembu retreated back east of uMzimkhulu while the rest were assimilated into the Mpondo polity as vassals.

AmaBhaca of Ncaphayi become a vassal

Soon after, King Faku received amaBhaca under Ncaphayi who pledged themselves to King Faku’s service and sought land. One of Madzikane’s minor sons, Dliwako, first led a section of amaBhaca into Faku’s Mpondo Kingdom for protection. Soon after, Ncaphayi—a more senior son—brought the remainder of the group. According to Bhaca oral tradition, Madzikane had long foreseen that his people would find peace only by seeking refuge with Faku. Upon their arrival, King Faku warmly welcomed amaBhaca. He granted them land in the northern reaches of his territory, primarily along the upper Mzimvubu River area. AmaBhaca settled as a semi-autonomous tributary chiefdom under Ncaphayi, adopting elements of Mpondo language and culture while retaining their distinct identity. This incorporation strengthened Faku’s kingdom by adding a significant military ally during a time of intense regional instability.

Ncaphayi quickly proved a valuable partner. From the mid-1820s to the early 1830s, amaBhaca under Ncaphayi became one of Faku’s most important military regiments. They participated enthusiastically in campaigns, including a major 1826 raid against the amaBomvana (who had re-entered Mpondo territory). In that operation, Faku’s Mpondo forces attacked directly while amaBhaca regiments were instructed to circle north to cut off the enemy’s retreat and seize cattle. Similar coordinated raids targeted abaThembu and other neighbours. Faku further cemented the alliance by marrying his daughter Dludla to Ncaphayi. The Bhaca provided crucial scouting, manpower, and combat support.

Tensions eventually strained the relationship. By the late 1830s, disputes arose—possibly over bride-wealth, cattle, or stock-raiding incidents. In December 1840, Boer forces under Andries Pretorius launched a devastating raid on Ncaphayi’s Bhaca kraals, killing dozens, seizing thousands of livestock, and taking captives (often termed “apprentices”). Faku distanced himself to avoid direct confrontation with the Boers. By 1845, the alliance had fully broken down. The amaBhaca sought to attack their hosts by allying with the amaXesibe (another amaMpondo vassal) and began raiding amaMpondo specifically those under Ndamase's Nyandeni section. In retaliation, Faku mobilized his Mpondo warriors. During the ensuing battle in 1845, Ncaphayi was killed at Nowalala. His son Makaula succeeded him as the principal amaBhaca leader.

Ncaphayi's death marked the end of the close Mpondo–Bhaca partnership, but it did not result in full Bhaca independence. A small remnant of the Bhaca stayed in Pondoland under Ncaphayi’s widow and then Makaula (the main Bhaca ruler thereafter). They distanced themselves by moving about thirty miles north but remained within the broader Pondoland region. Most other amaBhaca groups (under a nephew, Mdushane) moved toward Natal.

From 1845 onward, the Bhaca operated with practical autonomy and engaged in periodic skirmishes and mutual stock raids with the Mpondo. However, the Mpondo never accepted the amaBhaca as fully independent. Faku (and later his heir Mqikela) continued to treat them as subjects living on Mpondo land who refused to recognize Mpondo authority. The Mpondo launched multiple military campaigns to reassert dominance:

- In 1848–1849, Mpondo forces attacked Bhaca sub-chief Cetwa.
- In 1852, Mpondo warriors raided a Bhaca community near the Shawbury mission.
- In 1866, Mqikela led a major invasion with 7,000–8,000 Mpondo warriors against Makaula’s great place. The Bhaca initially fled but rallied and inflicted a disastrous defeat on the amaMpondo in hand-to-hand fighting. Mpondo oral tradition records that Faku had opposed the attack, but Mqikela proceeded anyway.

Soon after Faku’s death in 1867, Mqikela launched another offensive against the Bhaca, again aiming to bring them “back into the orbit of the Mpondo state.”

In short, while the tributary relationship ended with Ncaphayi’s death and the Bhaca successfully resisted full re-subjugation (at least militarily), they remained entangled in a hostile, contested relationship with the amaMpondo rather than becoming a completely separate and independent chiefdom. The Mpondo kings continued to assert suzerainty over them. Colonial powers (British in Natal and the Cape) increasingly intervened and eventually dominated both groups, but within the pre-colonial and immediate post-Faku context, the Bhaca never achieved full independence from Mpondo claims and pressure. This dynamic of rivalry and incomplete autonomy persisted for decades after Ncaphayi’s death.

Zulu Invasions

Impi Yama-Bhece (Watermelon War) 1824

King Faku had to face another invasion in 1824 by King Shaka’s amaZulu regiments led by their commander Mdlhaka. King Faku delegated command to his twenty-five-year-old son Ndamase. Ndamase mobilized the Mpondo rapidly, intercepted the invading amaZulu, and inflicted heavy losses on three senior Zulu regiments. Among the many amaZulu casualties was Sikhonyana ka Ngqungqulu who was seriously injured and was nursed back home by other amaZulu regiments. Mdhlaka had to reinforce the army with younger regiments; and only then were the Mpondo compelled to break contact, allowing the Zulu to withdraw. Even that withdrawal did not end the pressure. A Zulu oral informant later claimed that Faku used supernatural power to send hyenas against the retreating army. So the 1824 war was a crushing Zulu defeat. AmaZulu were to never forgive King Faku for this humiliating defeat which they termed the amaBhece campaign because the army had to run away eating watermelons and wild plants.

INHLAMBO 1828

Fresh from a rousing defeat of Zwide aided by white allies, and impressed by their artillery, King Shaka started preparing to use these against amaMpondo that had defeated him earlier, unfortunately, his mother passed away and a period of mourning ensued. No soon was the mourning period for his mother concluded, he led his army towards amaMpondo with spears and white mercenaries and their muskets. They poured into the amaMpondo in great numbers around uMzimvubu in 1828. Although King Faku again, re-organized his army and defended his territory under the military command of his capable son Ndamase, this time, victory was not as sweet, as the asymmetry of a combination of AmaZulu spears and English guns against amaMpondo spears proved decisive leading to a stalemate. AmaZulu were again forced to retreat without victory, but at least this time, without the humiliating defeat they had suffered in their first invasion.

War With Ama-Ngwane 1829

With his army still grazed by the bullets of King Shaka’s guns, Faku’s amaMpondo in 1829 came to the aid of King Ngubengcuka's abaThembu Kingdom around Mthatha's Mbolompo when they routed amaNgwane and greatly slew Matiwane's amaNgwane. At this point, it seems everyone wanted to test the efficacy of guns and King Faku’s amaMpondo were no different. The slaughter of amaNgwane were reduced to a vassal state and some assimilated into the Mpondo King’s state such that the Masumpa's still inhabit Mpondoland to this day.

=== Colonial contacts ===
Militarily, Faku was active throughout his reign, but his wars were directed primarily at African rivals. He engaged the Bomvana, Mpondomise, Thembu, Bhaca, and Xesibe at various points, seeking to dominate the regional balance of power. These conflicts were not incidental; they were central to the consolidation of the Mpondo state. After the attack by AmaZulu allied with English mercenaries, he saw it necessary to also get a colonial missionary. From the 1830s, onward, he maintained contact with the Cape Colony and later Natal through Wesleyan missionaries, who served as intermediaries. Through them, he communicated, negotiated, and gathered intelligence. He allowed missionary presence but as a diplomatic instrument, not once allowing any of his children to learn to read and write or to be taught by the Europeans. Neither he nor his family converted to Christianity, but often engaged cordially with the missionaries and engaged in trade with the Europeans. Also, he refused to be drawn into the orbit of their wars.

The most prominent missionary during Faku’s reign was the Reverend Thomas Jenkins, who arrived in Pondoland in 1838 and remained there until his death in 1868, only months after Faku. Jenkins acted as a trusted advisor; his extensive correspondence and surviving diary (covering 1845–1852 in detail) constitute one of the richest contemporary sources on Faku’s later life, diplomacy, and internal affairs.

When Boer trekkers established themselves in Natal in the late 1830s, and later when the British annexed Natal in the early 1840s, Faku found himself positioned between competing colonial powers. He exploited this situation with considerable skill. He aligned when it suited him, as in the 1844 treaty with the British under Maitland, but he resisted being drawn into their wars. The British repeatedly sought his military assistance against amaXhosa groups to the west, yet these efforts largely failed and King Faku always pretended that he could not assist because the River was too much to ford. Faku refused to commit his forces to conflicts that did not serve his interests. As historian Stapleton makes clear, this pattern of avoidance was consistent: Faku preserved his military resources for his own regional objectives and avoided entanglement in colonial campaigns. This decision was of profound significance. While other African polities were drawn into destructive wars with colonial states, Faku maintained autonomy for decades until he died.

=== Tension with Prince Ndamase and later years ===
Internally, however, his greatest challenge emerged not from external enemies but from within his own house. His son, Ndamase, rose as a powerful military figure, commanding regiments and earning a reputation for bravery and leadership. By the 1840s, Ndamase had effectively become a major political force in his own right. The tensions between father and son culminated in the events around 1845, after which Ndamase crossed the Mzimvubu River and established himself in the west. From that point onward, the Mpondo polity existed in a dual form: Faku ruled in the east, while Ndamase exercised autonomous authority in the west. This was not a formal division declared by Faku, but a political reality he was unable—or unwilling—to reverse. The relationship between them remained complex: there was no decisive confrontation, but neither was there reintegration. Even colonial officials recognised this dual authority, at times dealing with both figures separately.

Loss of Land to the British

In his later years, Faku faced increasing colonial pressure. From the 1850s onward, both the Cape and Natal sought to expand their influence into Mpondo territory.

In the early 1850s, colonial officials in Natal sought to amend the territorial provisions of the 1844 treaty. In 1854–1855, Natal commissioner Walter Harding, accompanied by Henry Francis Fynn, met with Faku and his councillors to obtain consent for enlarging Natal’s boundary into Mpondo territory. The stated reason was to relieve Faku of responsibility for stock theft (particularly by San/Bushmen groups) occurring in the area between the Mzimkhulu and Mtamvuna rivers. Although Wesleyan missionary Thomas Jenkins attempted to negotiate more favourable terms for the Mpondo, Faku ultimately agreed to the alteration. A new document was signed that ceded the country lying east of the western branch of the Mtamvuna River (and a line running from there to the Drakensberg), thereby moving the boundary southwest from the Mzimkhulu River. This document, was not co-signed with Ndamase who had already moved west unlike the Maitland Treaty.

Further pressure on Mpondo territory occurred in the early 1860s. In November 1860, Governor George Grey proposed settling Adam Kok’s Griqua—a mixed-race group then living north of the Drakensberg—in the northeastern section of the Mpondo Kingdom. Faku strongly objected through Jenkins, arguing that the 1844 treaty had guaranteed Mpondo borders and that his land could not be taken for the Griqua. Despite these protests, approximately 3,000 Griqua moved into the area in 1863. This territory, located just south of the Drakensberg Mountains in what had been the northern part of Eastern Pondoland, became known as Griqualand East, with the modern town of Kokstad named after Griqua leader Adam Kok.

The Griqua settlement and associated boundary adjustments led to ongoing disputes. Faku and his successor Mqikela continued to view the Griqua as occupying Mpondo land, while the Griqua acted as an independent force and engaged in raids and counter-accusations of horse theft against the Mpondo. Colonial officials occasionally discussed integrating the Griqua into the Mpondo Kingdom or exchanging land, but these plans were largely abandoned amid deteriorating relations. The establishment of Griqualand East represented a significant loss of territory for the Mpondo in Faku’s final years.

The crossing of Ndamase to the West of Mzimvubu seems to have weakened King Faku's military power and capacity to negotiate knowing well that he had a capable military commander. He was left with half his army and Ndamase was more focused on subjugating other vassal states such as abaThembu and amaMpondomise and asserting his dominance on the Western side. Thus, King Faku, old and frail, had to resort to diplomacy rather than the threat of war. Agreements were imposed, and land was gradually lost. Yet even in old age, Faku remained a capable negotiator, using his experience and connections to delay deeper encroachment.

His long reign, extending over five decades, allowed him to navigate multiple phases of transformation—from early nineteenth-century upheaval to mid-century colonial expansion.

== Death and legacy ==
Faku died on the 29 October 1867 at exactly 87 years old. By the time of his death, the kingdom was both strong and divided. In the east, his son Mqikela assumed kingship without opposition, but his authority did not extend into the west, where his son Ndamase had long established his own power since 1845 after a brief quarrel with his father and thus ruled semi-autonomously. This outcome reflected both the strength and the limits of Faku’s rule. He had created a powerful and enduring state, yet he had not fully resolved the internal dynamics of royal power that allowed alternative centres of authority to emerge even during his lifetime.

In historical perspective, Faku stands as one of the most significant rulers of the amaMpondo. He was not merely a passive intermediary between Africans and Europeans, nor a minor figure overshadowed by larger kingdoms. He was a state-builder, a military leader, and a strategist of considerable skill. His wars against African rivals were not random but purposeful. His kingship was neither absolute nor fragile, but negotiated within a complex system of power. Above all, his reign demonstrates that African political systems of the nineteenth century were dynamic, adaptive, and capable of producing leaders of great ability.

During his lifetime, King Faku, earned the official Royal greeting Jasele (he who crushes all) from his people after defeating amaQwabe in 1832, and was affectionately called Sophankomo (he who gifts his people in cattle) and a plethora of praise poems.

Some rendered thus:

Nzuka mthi kosala izipunzi ku-Sontswelane,

Bayadla bayasola oo-Nongingila ka Nomatshobe'Ndlovu

uNokhalimel'ibango lide libangazeke

^{[1]} C. de B. Webb and J.B. Wright (eds.), The James Stuart Archive of Recorded Oral Evidence Relating to the History of the Zulu and Neighbouring Peoples (Durban: Killie Campbell Africana Library, 1976), vol. 1, pp. 298–99, evidence of Lunguza ka Mpukane, 11, 3, 1909.

During his reign, King Faku consolidated and unified several groups and expanded the territory he had inherited from his father. Through a series of events, the kingdom was eventually annexed by the British Empire, became part of the Cape Colony and is today a section of the Eastern Cape province of South Africa.
