= Intsika Yethu Local Municipality =

Coordinates: 32°00′29″S 27°35′03″E

Intsika Yethu
- Local municipality
- Seal

- Location in the Eastern Cape
- Country: South Africa
- Province: Eastern Cape
- District: Chris Hani
- Seat: Cofimvaba
- Wards: 21

Government
  - Type: Municipal council
  - Mayor: Khanyiswa Mdleleni (ANC)
  - Speaker: Myolisi Toni (ANC)
  - Chief Whip: Yanga Zicina (ANC)

Area
  - Total: 2,711 km^{2} (1,047 sq mi)

Population (2011)
  - Total: 145,372
  - Density: 53.62/km^{2} (138.9/sq mi)

Racial makeup (2011)
  - Black African: 99.4%
  - Coloured: 0.2%
  - Indian/Asian: 0.1%
  - White: 0.1%

First languages (2011)
  - Xhosa: 95.9%
  - English: 1.5%
  - Other: 2.6%
- Time zone: UTC+2 (SAST)
- Municipal code: EC135

Intsika Yethu Municipality (Xhosa: uMasipala wase Intsika Yethu) is a local municipality within the Chris Hani District Municipality, in the Eastern Cape province of South Africa. The municipality is one of the six local municipality in this district. Intsika Yethu is an isiXhosa word meaning "our pillars".

== Main places ==
The 2001 census divided the municipality into the following main places:

Place	Code	Area (km^{2})	Population
Amabhele	22201	50.39	2,901
Amahlubi	22202	373.66	21,761
Amazizi	22203	153.62	6,614
Cofimvaba Part 1	22204	23.22	4,654
Cofimvaba Part 2	22225	46.48	3,612
Ehlatini	22205	123.15	2,650
Emaqwatini	22206	171.21	7,629
Engcobo	22207	18.42	1,054
Gcaleka	22208	45.97	4,041
Gcuwa	22209	90.10	4,824
Hala	22210	598.02	27,005
Idutywa	22211	80.35	5,513
Intsika Yethu	22212	9.29	30
Jumba	22213	91.59	6,216
KwaNkwenkwazi	22214	187.20	11,575
Lady Frere	22215	12.46	217
Mhlontlo	22216	28.79	597
Mtshanyana	22217	273.57	12,211
Ncora	22218	177.97	9,755
Ndlunkulu	22219	73.11	4,322
Ndungwana	22220	267.03	12,069
Qamata	22221	478.40	31,056
Qwebeqwebe	22222	135.96	7,869
Tsomo Part 1	22223	74.21	3,666
Tsomo Part 2	22226	6.80	979
Xalanga	22224	27.93	1,441

== People ==
In 2016, the population was 146,341 with an estimated population growth of 0.09% per year. This rural community is 99% Black with Xhosa as the most widely spoken language.

Villages within the district have a sense of community and often work collectively, forming communal networks to address their impoverished circumstances. Women generally head households and support their families through informal employment. They are primarily responsible for caring for the elderly and younger members of the family, providing food and gathering firewood.

The late political activist and former leader of the South African Communist Party, Chris Hani, was born in Intsika Yethu in the town of Sabalele. He grew up in a home with five siblings, his mother Nomayise and father Gilbert. The province commemorates the late Chris Hani with a statue, a municipality named after him and the annual Chris Hani Freedom Marathon, which is held on the route that Hani walked to school.

== Infrastructure ==
This predominantly rural area is characterised by poverty and unemployment, subsistence farming, food insecurity and diseases like HIV/AIDS. Natural disasters such as drought, erosion, and floods and a lack of adequate emergency plans make pre-existing shortages worse.

Intsika Yethu is part of the greater Chris Hani District Municipality that was reported as one of three HIV/AIDS hotspots in the Eastern Cape. This, while the prevalence of new infections and the syndrome have decreased in other districts in the province.

The area remains underserviced with only 2.4% of the 35 851 households having piped water within their homes in 2016. In 2016, President Jacob Zuma launched the Ncora Bulk Water Project, a government initiative that committed to delivering water to areas in the Chris Hani District Municipality and other areas in the country. This project also aimed to broadened the areas’ economic activities. Its main economic sectors include community services, trade and agriculture.

As part of Eskom’s mission to achieve widespread access to electricity for South Africans by 2020, 94 000 homes were connected over three years in the Eastern Cape. In 2016, 86.6% of the homes in Intsika Yethu had electricity.

== Economy ==
Many of the households rely on social grants as their sole source of income. The working-age population is largely absent in this region with poorly developed infrastructure and limited employment opportunities. Youth often migrate to the cities in search of work in labour-intensive industries like mining.

== Politics ==
The municipal council consists of forty-two members elected by mixed-member proportional representation. Twenty-one councillors are elected by first-past-the-post voting in twenty-one wards, while the remaining twenty-one are chosen from party lists so that the total number of party representatives is proportional to the number of votes received. In the election of 1 November 2021 the African National Congress (ANC) won a majority of thirty-five seats on the council.

The following table shows the results of the election.

Intsika Yethu local election, 1 November 2021
Party	Votes				Seats		
Party	Ward	List	Total	%	Ward	List	Total
African National Congress	27,300	28,280	55,580	78.4%	21	14	35
Economic Freedom Fighters	2,995	3,249	6,244	8.8%	0	4	4
Independent candidates	3,590	–	3,590	5.1%	0	–	0
United Democratic Movement	783	1,192	1,975	2.8%	0	1	1
Democratic Alliance	680	675	1,355	1.9%	0	1	1
Pan Africanist Congress of Azania	369	767	1,136	1.6%	0	1	1
African Transformation Movement	321	489	810	1.1%	0	0	0
Inkatha Freedom Party	2	192	194	0.3%	0	0	0
Total	36,040	34,844	70,884		21	21	42
Valid votes	36,040	34,844	70,884	97.2%			
Spoilt votes	809	1,256	2,065	2.8%			
Total votes cast	36,849	36,100	72,949				
Voter turnout	36,925						
Registered voters	75,098						
Turnout percentage	49.2%						
