= 1987 Transkei coup d'état =

Bloodless military coup d'état in Transkei

- Map of Transkei (red) within South Africa.
- Date: 30 December 1987; 38 years ago
- Location: (Transkei) Umtata
- Type: Military coup
- Motive: Regime change
- Target: TNIP–led government of Stella Sigcau
- Organised by: Bantu Holomisa
- Participants: Transkei Defence Force (faction)
- Outcome: Coup succeeds: The overthrow of government of Prime Minister Sigcau.; The establishment of military rule under the Military Council headed by Major General Holomisa.

Topographic map of Transkei.

The 1987 Transkei coup d'état was a bloodless military coup in Transkei, an unrecognised state and a nominally independent South African homeland for the Xhosa people, which took place on 30 December 1987. The coup was led by the then 32-year-old Major General Bantu Holomisa, the Chief of the Transkei Defence Force, against the government of Prime Minister Stella Sigcau (TNIP). Holomisa suspended the civilian constitution and refused South Africa's repeated demands for a return to civilian rule on the grounds that a civilian government would be a puppet controlled by Pretoria.

A counter-coup staged in 1990 failed, and Holomisa's military government stayed in power until the reunification of Transkei with South Africa in 1994, after the first post-apartheid general election.

The Military Rule Medal was instituted to commemorate the 1987 coup d'état. While the medal is known to have been instituted and awarded, no warrant has yet been traced.

== See also ==
- 1990 Ciskei coup d'état
- 1990 Venda coup d'état
- 1994 Bophuthatswana crisis
