= George Matanzima =

South African politician (1918–2000)

George Mathanzima

2nd prime minister of Transkei
- In office 20 February 1979 – 24 September 1987
- President: Kaiser Matanzima
- Preceded by: Kaiser Matanzima
- Succeeded by: Dumnisani Gladstone Gwadiso (Acting); Stella Sigcau

Personal details
- Born: George Mzimvubu Mathanzima; 26 December 1918 Qamata, Cape, South Africa
- Died: 10 November 2000 (aged 81) Queenstown, Eastern Cape, South Africa
- Party: Transkei National Independence Party

Chief George Mzimvubu Matanzima, often misspelled as Mathanzima (26 December 1918 – 10 November 2000) was a leader of the Transkei bantustan in South Africa, a young brother of Kaiser and a grandnephew of Nelson Mandela. He and his brother, Kaiser co-founded and led the Transkei National Independence Party. Mathanzima was appointed as Prime Minister of Transkei after his brother became president. He served as prime minister from 20 February 1979 to 24 September 1987. Bantu Holomisa forced his resignation and exile in October 1987. Stella Sigcau succeeded him as prime minister, but Holomisa forced her out of office in a coup d'état and took power himself in December 1987.

== Government crackdown ==
The independence of the Transkei was widely rejected by critics of the Nationalist government worldwide. Some of the most vocal critics came from within the Transkei itself, from the leaders of the Black Consciousness Movement rejecting the move for statehood.

In the lead up to the independence-day celebrations of 1976, Matanzima detained political activists and cultural artists under Proclamation 400, an act similar in function to the Apartheid government's Terrorism Act. George Matanzima banned the Democratic Progressive Party that was led by the AbaThembu King Sabata Dalindyebo. He was accused of bringing the President Kaiser Matanzima's name into disrepute, as a result having his crown taken away. The 1980s saw an even more severe crackdown by Matanzima, arresting journalists and students who were vocal about the Transkei government.

== Corruption charges ==
By the mid 1980s, Matanzima's position as prime minister was brought into question when an audit launched by the Nationalist government of South Africa revealed the embezzlement of state funds by Matanzima and his brother. This led to an investigation over the accepting of $500,000 in kickbacks from a Lebanese businessman who needed to secure a housing contract in the Transkei. Further claims were made that South African business tycoon Sol Kerzner paid Matanzima and some members of his cabinet two million Rand in order to secure exclusive gambling rights in the Transkei. By this time Matanzima had been elected president of the Transkei National Independence Party.

The relationship between the Matanzima brothers soured when a dispute over party candidate selections emerged. Kaizer Matanzima testified against his brother during the 1987 Alexander Commission of Inquiry, headed by Judge Alexander. The judge made recommendations that Matanzima's case be referred to the Attorney General. As a result, George Matanzima banished his brother Kaizer Matanzima from the Transkei.

== Coup ==
In 1987 then Defence Force chief Major General Bantu Holomisa orchestrated a coup against George Matanzima in the wake of the massive corruption scandal. Six of his cabinet ministers were forced to resign by Gen. Holomisa as they were found to have unduly benefited from Matanzima's network.

Matanzima's successor was Stella Sigcau, daughter of Paramount Chief Botha Sigcau. She too was linked to having accepted kickbacks from George Matanzima, and was subsequently requested to vacate her position as prime minister. Matanzima fled to Austria, fearing arrest. The Nationalist government of South Africa gave him an assurance that he would not be detained, but on his return he was forced to hand himself over to the authorities. He was sentenced to nine years in prison, but only served three of those years. George Matanzima died in Queenstown, in November 2000.

== See also ==
- Steve Biko
- United Democratic Front
- African National Congress

Political offices
Preceded by Kaiser Matanzima	Prime Minister of Transkei; 1979–1987	Succeeded by Dumnisani Gladstone Gwadiso (Acting)
