= Nkosi Ntsikayezwe Sigcau =

Nkosi Ntsikayezwe Twenty-man Sigcau (1947–1996) was a leader of the Lwandlolubomvu Traditional Council. He was a member of the royal family of the Ama Ama Mpondo Kingdom. He was the youngest son of King Botha Sigcau and brother to Princess Stella Sigcau, and his elder brother King Mpondombini Sigcau. Nkosi Ntsikayezwe Sigcau was father to Nkosi Nzululwazi Sigcau, Princess Stella Kholeka Sigcau and Princess ZamaFaku Sigcau. From 1994 to his death in 1996, he was serving as an ANC member in the Eastern Cape Legislature.

References- Dial Ndima in his book The law of Commoners and Kings: Narratives of a Rural Transkei Magistrate wrote, “The accused Chief Ntsikayezwe Sigcau was a chief in Ntabankulu District. The government’s accusation against him was that he was sympathetic to the then banned African National Congress, which he had visited in exile in Zambia long before the official national negotiations were in place, and this was generally known. "The Law of Commoners and Kings: Narratives of a Rural Transkei Magistrate, page 58" According to a book Mandela's Kinsmen, Jacana Media (ltd), 2014, p53 Timothy Gibbs says "It was clear that Nkosi Ntsikayezwe was one of the handful of young Mpondo Royals who was involved in radical political circles even making informal links with the ANC.

in 1974 Ntsikayezwe Sigcau became known as one of the leaders of violent anti rehabilitation protests. p129 "Chief Ntsikayezwe Sigcau was taken to Lusaka to meet Chris Hani and the ANC leadership. Apartheid officials were clearly worried"

References- from the speech of the former Deputy President Phumzile Mlambo Ngcuka, "Date: 08/04/2006 Source: The Presidency Title: Mlambo-Ngcuka: Commemoration and unveiling of stone of Inkosi Ntsikayezwe Sigcau From the Address delivered by the Deputy President, Phumzile Mlambo-Ngcuka, at the 10th commemoration and unveiling of the stone of Inkosi Ntsikayezwe Sigcau, Tabankulu (http://www.polity.org.za/article/mlambongcuka-commemoration-and-unveiling-of-stone-of-inkosi-ntsikayezwe-sigcau-08042006-2006-04-08)

" Nkosi Ntsikayezwe Sigcau belonged to the Royal family of Ama Mpondo Kingdom. Nkosi Ntsikayezwe Sigcau exhibited in all his life the legacy that was left by his forefathers, the Great Pondo Kings, as he always reflected a strong leadership capacity, bravery and sense of identity. He committed himself to fighting for the liberation of all of South Africa at all costs. This further endeared him to his people who, despite the fact that he was a chief, was also an elected representative of his people in the Eastern Cape Legislature from 1994 until his death in 1996. He dedicated his life to ensuring that African people are freed from mental slavery, poverty, colonisation, of the mind and any form of oppression. In him we had a chief who embraced both traditional leadership as well as modern democratic principles"

== Activism ==
Sigcau was very vocal on articulating his political convictions and very defiant, organising some of the boycotts, establishing a strong ANC base in the Transkei, hiding some of the political activist who were wanted by the colonial authorities in Mpondoland, in Ntabankulu in particular, arrested many times for his political beliefs. The list goes on. In 2012, the ANC honoured his legacy and his role in the liberation struggle by taking the centenary touch to his homestead, Lwandlolubomvu, Matshona Village, Ntabankulu, where a wreath was laid on his grave. In 2014, Ntabankulu Municipality honoured him with an Award for his role in the liberation struggle.

He was also honoured posthumously during the Pondo Culture and Heritage Festival with the first King Faku Award for his bravery and the sacrifices he made during the struggle for liberation and contribution in building a sustainable South African nation.

Sigcau was very passionate about Mpondo culture, history and heritage as he was with freedom of all South Africans from all forms of oppression. He was also passionate about youth, education, sports and rural development. In his effort to support education, he gave a plot of his land so that a school is built. The school was built and named Ntsikayezwe Senior Secondary School. He was very concerned about the developmental, social challenges and high levels of poverty in South Africa. He believed in unity in a diversity of cultures and in sharing our beautiful African cultures with the rest of the world. He felt strongly against the colonisation of the mind and mental slavery. He believed in the concept of Ubuntu. Pondo Culture and Heritage Festival was launched in 2006 during his commemoration and to also honour his legacy.
