= Kaiser Matanzima =

South African politician (1915–2003)

2nd President of Transkei
- In office 20 February 1979 – 20 February 1986
- Prime Minister: George Matanzima
- Preceded by: Botha Sigcau; Zwelibanzi Maneli Mabandla (Acting)
- Succeeded by: Tutor Ndamase

1st Prime Minister of Transkei
- In office 26 October 1976 – 20 February 1979
- President: Botha Sigcau; Zwelibanzi Maneli Mabandla (Acting)
- Preceded by: Position established
- Succeeded by: George Matanzima

Chief Minister of Transkei
- In office 6 December 1963 – 26 October 1976
- Preceded by: Position established
- Succeeded by: Position abolished

Personal details
- Born: Kaiser Daliwonga Mathanzima; 15 June 1915 Qamata in Cofimvaba, Cape, South Africa
- Died: 15 June 2003 (aged 88) Queenstown, Eastern Cape, South Africa
- Party: Transkei National Independence Party

Chief Kaiser Daliwonga Matanzima, often misspelled as Mathanzima (15 June 1915 – 15 June 2003), was the long-term leader of Transkei. In 1950, the South African government first offered to establish an autonomous Transkei authority under the Bantu Authorities Act, but the Bhunga, the council of Transkei chiefs, rejected the proposal. However, Matanzima was in favour and in 1955 Matanzima persuaded them to accept it.

== Early life and education ==
Born in Qamata, Cape Province, a brother of George, Ngangomhlaba and a grandnephew of Nelson Mandela, Mathanzima spent part of his childhood at the homestead of Chief Falo Mgudlwa, a repository of Thembu history and lore. He received the name Daliwonga (meaning "Maker of Majesty") upon reaching manhood as an "isikhahlelo" (praise name). Mathanzima studied law at Fort Hare University and completed his articles in the Transkei capital, Mthatha, in 1948. However, he never practised law, instead, he involved himself in Thembu and Transkei politics.

== Political career ==
Made paramount chief of the "Emigrant Thembus", a breakaway and sub-group to the Thembus, Mathanzima's support of the South African government's Bantu Authorities Act (1951), which looked to foster traditional African leadership structures, gave the Act credibility in the eyes of many chiefs, but saw him part ways with Mandela politically (although the two initially remained friends, with Mathanzima acting as best man at Mandela's wedding).

=== Relationship with South African government ===
In his 1975 book Independence My Way, Mathanzima argued that emancipation would come through a federation of semi-autonomous black states, such as Transkei, rather than through the militant nationalism espoused by the African National Congress (ANC). Mandela condemned Mathanzima as a de facto supporter of apartheid.

Mathanzima became a member of the United Transkeian Territorial Council in 1955 and an Executive Council member of the newly created Transkeian Territorial Authority (TTA) in 1956. In 1961 he graduated to Chairman of the TTA, survived an assassination attempt in December 1962 by members of the Pan Africanist Congress, and in 1963 was an obvious candidate for Chief Minister of the newly formed Transkeian Legislative Assembly. Mathanzima was not a popular vote for everyone because of his strong support of apartheid. Mathanzima and his brother George founded the Transkei National Independence Party, led it to election victories in 1968 and 1973, and was sworn in as Prime Minister in 1976 when Transkei became the first bantustan to gain nominal independence. According to an article published in Time Magazine at the time, though Transkei declared independence theoretically as a "free state", Mathanzima ruled the territory as a de facto puppet-state dictator, banning local opposition parties and buying at subsidized prices Transkei farmlands offered by the South African government.

Mathanzima clashed with the South African government over various issues, mostly connected with territorial demands made by Mathanzima. This led to his announcement on 2 February 1978 that Transkei would break all diplomatic ties with South Africa, including the non-aggression pact between them. He ordered that all South African Defence Force members seconded to the Transkei Army leave Transkei by 31 March. But he soon backed down in the face of Transkei's dependence on South African economic aid.

=== Presidency ===
In 1979, after the death of AmaMpondo King Botha Sigcau, Mathanzima became state president, with his brother George as prime minister. Their approach included jailing protesters and banning such opposition parties as, in 1980, the Democratic Progressive Party. That party's leader, AbaThembu King Sabata Dalindyebo, was convicted of "violating the dignity" of President Mathanzima, but escaped to Zambia and joined the ANC.

Mandela's father-in-law was a member of the Transkei cabinet, and Mathanzima attempted to persuade Mandela to accept exile in Transkei in lieu of imprisonment. Mandela not only refused but declined to see Mathanzima during his imprisonment on Robben Island, fearing that such a meeting would legitimize the bantustans to the international community.

However, in common with other bantustan leaders, Mathanzima did not shy away from criticism of South Africa's racial policies and called for the repeal of Apartheid legislation (which were repealed in bantustans that were nominally independent), and occasionally pressed for a federal system for South Africa.

=== Retirement ===
On 20 February 1986, faced with South African evidence of corruption, Mathanzima was forced to retire as president, although he tried to claim that he wanted to spend more time dealing with family affairs. Kaiser Mathanzima was replaced as president by his brother, George Mathanzima, who resigned later on because he too had been accused of being corrupt. Kaiser Mathanzima was still described as Transkei's effective leader for a time, but the two soon fell out and Kaiser was temporarily detained in the Transkei gaols in 1987; upon release, he was restricted to Qamata.

== Death ==
Matanzima died in Queenstown on his 88th birthday. He received an official funeral, but not a state one as former allies and supporters had hoped. The continued mixed feelings toward him in South Africa were reflected in then President Thabo Mbeki's eulogy for him. Although Matanzima was said to have been a harsh ruler, Mbeki looked at the positive legacies that Matanzima left behind. Mbeki praised Matanzima's dream of eliminating poverty in South Africa as well as seeing all South Africans citizens educated. Others who spoke at Matanzima's funeral said they admired how he fought to see the recognition of traditional leaders in South Africa. Former South African President and Kaiser Matanzima's great-uncle, Nelson Mandela, was not in attendance for Matanzima's funeral because he was in Dublin, Ireland for the opening ceremonies of the 2003 Special Olympics.

Matanzima's grandson, King Lwandile Zwelenkosi Matanzima, ruler of Western Thembuland of Eastern Cape, died on 22 May 2010.

Political offices
Preceded by Zwelibanzi Maneli Mabandla (Acting)	President of Transkei; 1979–1986	Succeeded by Tutor Ndamase
New title	Prime Minister of Transkei; 1976–1979	Succeeded by George Matanzima
New title	Chief Minister of Transkei; 1963–1976	Position abolished
