= Mamlambo =

South African deity

Mamlambo is a deity in South African and Zulu mythology, the "goddess of rivers", described as a large snake-like creature.

In 1997, South African newspapers (including Johannesburg's The Star and Cape Town's Cape Argus) reported on sightings of a "giant reptile" monster in the Mzintlava River near Mount Ayliff in South Africa. Villagers in the area claimed that the creature was about 20 meters (65.62 feet) long, had the head of a horse, the lower body of a fish, short legs, and the neck of a snake, and that it shined with a green light at night. During the period between January and April 1997, as many as nine deaths had been attributed to the Mamlambo. According to police, the victims had been in the water a while and had the soft parts of their heads and neck eaten by crabs; local villagers, on the other hand, claimed that these mutilations had been caused by the mamlambo's habit of eating faces and brains. For this reason, the Mamlambo is often referred to as "the Brain Sucker". As Felicity Wood points out in The Extraordinary Khotso (2007), "the mamlambo tends to be associated with Western forms of prosperity, like money, so the fact that she is often depicted as a Western mermaid. She has arisen in part from a sense of disconnection to a traditional, communal way of life, inequalities and imbalances in the social order, and the lure of Western materialism. Like the Mami Wata, she is a dangerous, seductive figure, offering wealth and power but able to bring about terrifying ruin".

== Film and television ==
- An expedition in search of the mamlambo was done on the SyFy Show Destination Truth; the mission found no evidence of the creature's existence.
- The Cartoon Network animated series Secret Saturdays features a cryptid inspired by the Mamlambo in an episode.

== See also ==
- Hippocampus (mythology)
- List of hybrid creatures in mythology
