= Transkei Defence Force =

Defence force of the Republic of Transkei

- Flag of the TDF
- Founded: 1981
- Disbanded: April 1994
- Service branches: Infantry; Special Forces; Air Wing
- Headquarters: Umtata

Leadership
- Commander-in-Chief: Major General Bantu Holomisa

Personnel
- Military age: 18–49

Related articles
- History: Military history of South Africa
- Ranks: Military ranks of Transkei

The Transkei Defence Force (TDF) was established during March 1981, from the 141 Battalion of the South African Defence Force (SADF). It was the defence force of the Republic of Transkei, a nominally independent bantustan during the Apartheid era of South Africa.

== History ==
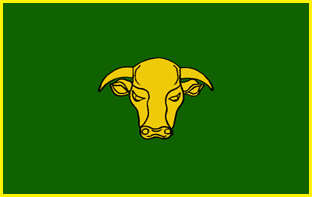
Transkei Defence Force Army Flag

=== Origin ===
In 1981, the newly formed Transkei Defence Force (TDF) received a gift of equipment from the South African Defence Force.

=== The Rhodesian connection ===
In 1982, the Minister of Defence and then prime minister, G.M. Matazima announced the employment of a group of expatriate advisers from the former Rhodesia. A group of about 30 former Rhodesians had actually commenced employment in March 1981, under the auspices of the Security Services Transkei Company. Former Rhodesian Selous Scouts founder Ronald Reid-Daly was hired to serve as commander of the TDF and to supervise training.

=== Head of the Defence Force ===
President K.D. Matanzima retired as State President in February 1986, and was succeeded by his brother, G.M. Matanzima.

=== Attack on the Ciskei ===
In 1985, Apartheid practitioners conceived a plan to merge the Transkei and Ciskei and create a 'united nation of Xhosa speakers' who they thought would support the South African government and help it to stamp out unrest in the Eastern Cape. Matanzima had long held ambitions to rule such a territory, and had opposed the 'independence' of Ciskei in 1981 in the hope that this merger would be realised.

On 19 February 1987, a truckload of Transkei special forces entered the Ciskeian capital Bisho, and unsuccessfully attacked the home of the Ciskei President, Chief Lennox Sebe. The raid was apparently under the control of former members of the Rhodesian Security Forces, although Matanzima refused to admit Transkeian involvement. The raid appeared to be aimed at the overthrow of Lennox Sebe, but the plan failed, after it was leaked to Brigadier Bantu Holomisa.

==== Consequences of the attack ====
This together with resistance to the raid from elements within the Transkei, played an important role in the ascendance to power of Stella Sigcau and Brigadier Bantu Holomisa.

By April 1987, the contracts of 27 white military officers, including the former Rhodesians, were terminated and a group of 20 of these men including their commander, Major General Ronald Reid-Daly were expelled from the Transkei.

Rumours of a coup attempt by the former State President K.D. Matanzima followed the expulsions. The botched raid also earned Transkei the enmity of South Africa which had considered the Rhodesians to be a stabilising factor.

President G.M Matanzima announced Brigadier Holomisa who had been released due to public pressure after nine weeks detention would be promoted to major general and would succeed General Zondwa Mtirara as commander of the TDF. Holomisa had been detained by the Government as he had apparently agitated against the role of the white officers in the TDF as well as stirring disaffection on the basis of the Matanzima government.

=== Coup ===
By 23 September 1987, TDF soldiers served resignation letters on the Transkei cabinet. President G.M. Matanzima resigned in the wake of mounting evidence of corruption. Ms Stella Sigcau was elected as the new prime minister, but the TDF took over the administration of the Transkei in a bloodless coup on 30 December 1987, after only 86 days. Major General Holomisa declared martial law and suspended the Transkei constitution, alleging Ms. Sigcau had been involved in the corruption as well. A military council was formed and remained in power.

=== Coup attempt ===
In November 1990, a group of six white and black soldiers attempted to mount a coup, but they failed when troops loyal to Holomisa overcame the plotters. Eighteen people were killed, including the leader of the coup, Colonel Craig Duli.

=== Equipment ===
The TDF was equipped for counter-insurgency (COIN) operations. The TDF used:

- R4/R5 assault rifles,
- 7.62 mm (0.300 in) light machine guns,
- 40 mm (1.6 in) multiple grenade launchers,
- 60 mm (2.4 in) and 81 mm (3.2 in) mortars and
- 7.62 mm (0.300 in) Browning machine guns.

== Insignia ==
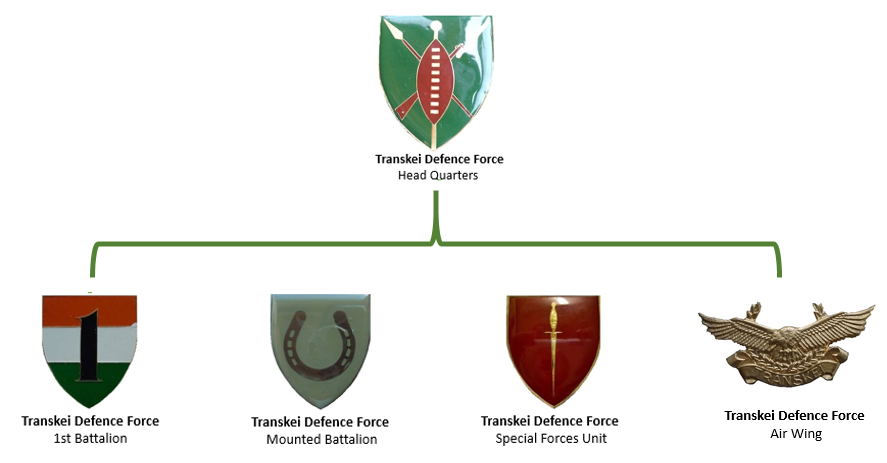
Transkei Defence Force insignia

== Ranks ==
Rank group	General / flag officers				Senior officers			Junior officers
Transkei Army
Transkei Army	General	Lieutenant general	Major general	Brigadier	Colonel	Lieutenant colonel	Major	Captain	Lieutenant	Second lieutenant

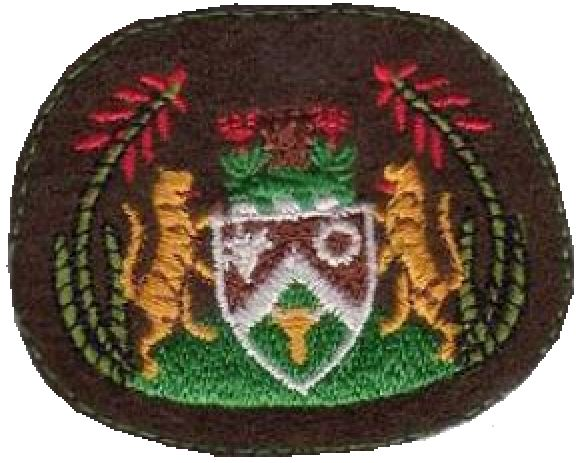
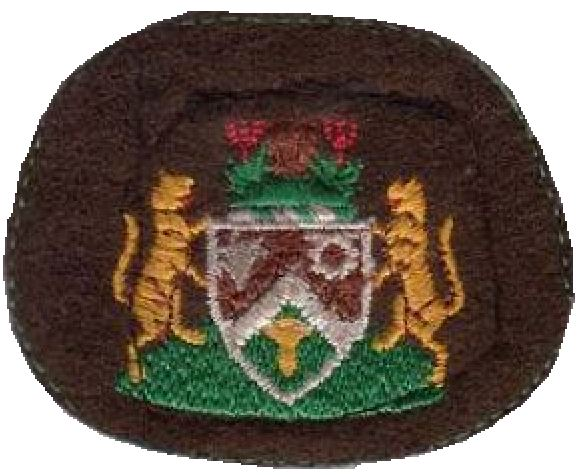
Rank group	Senior NCOs				Junior NCOs		Enlisted
Transkei Army							No insignia
Transkei Army	Chief warrant officer	Warrant officer	Staff sergeant	Sergeant	Corporal	Lance corporal	Private

== Awards ==
- Cross for Bravery
- Faithful Service Medal (10 Years)
- Independence Medal
- Military Rule Medal
- Transkei Defence Force Medal
- Commander Class Medal (CCM)

== Disbandment ==
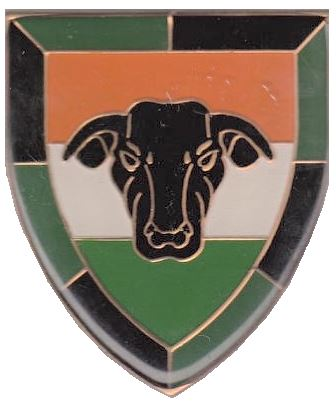
SANDF's 14 SAI emblem

With the end of Apartheid in 1994 in South Africa, the former defence forces of the Bantustans were incorporated into the newly formed South African National Defence Force. The SANDF's new 14 South African Infantry Battalion heraldry clearly originates from the Transkei Defence Force, its forebear.
