= Bantu Holomisa =

South African politician (born 1955)

The Honorable Major General Bantu Holomisa MP
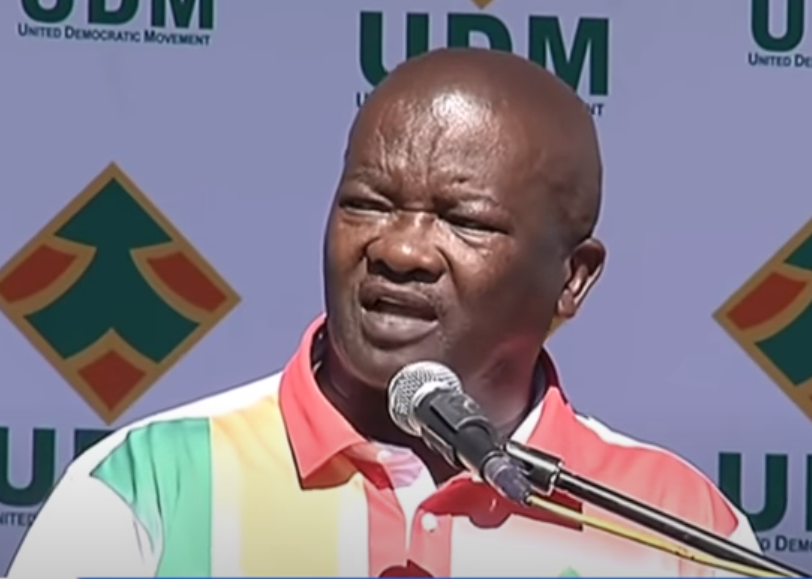
- Holomisa delivering a speech in Khutsong, Gauteng in 2019

Deputy Minister of Defence and Military Veterans
- Incumbent
- Assumed office 30 June 2024 Serving with Richard Mkhungo
- President: Cyril Ramaphosa
- Minister: Angie Motshekga
- Preceded by: Thabang Makwetla

President of the United Democratic Movement
- Incumbent
- Assumed office 27 September 1997
- Deputy: Khanyisile Litchfield-Tshabalala; Nqabayomzi Kwankwa
- Preceded by: Position established

Deputy Minister of Environmental Affairs and Tourism of South Africa
- In office 1994–1996
- President: Nelson Mandela
- Minister: Dawie de Villiers

Member of the National Assembly of South Africa
- Incumbent
- Assumed office since 1994

4th Head of Government of Transkei Chairman of the Military Council and of the Council of Ministers
- In office 30 December 1987 – 26 April 1994
- President: Tutor Ndamase
- Preceded by: Stella Sigcau (as prime minister)
- Succeeded by: Position abolished

Personal details
- Born: Bantubonke Harrington Holomisa; 25 July 1955 (age 71) Mqanduli, South Africa
- Party: United Democratic Movement (1997–present)
- Other political affiliations: African National Congress (1994–1996)

Military service
- Allegiance: Republic of Transkei
- Branch/service: Transkei Defence Force
- Years of service: 1976–1994
- Rank: Major General; Brigadier (1985)
- Unit: 141 Battalion
- Commands: South African Defence Force

Bantubonke Harrington Holomisa (born 25 July 1955) is a South African politician. He is a member of parliament for and president of the United Democratic Movement. and the current Deputy Minister of Defence and Military Veterans. Holomisa was born in Mqanduli, Cape Province. He joined the Transkei Defence Force in 1976 and had become a brigadier by 1985.

Holomisa forced the resignation and exile of Prime Minister of Transkei George Matanzima in October 1987 and overthrew Matanzima's successor, Prime Minister Stella Sigcau in a bloodless coup d'état in December 1987. Holomisa then became the head of government of Transkei from 1987 to 1994, upon which Transkei was reintegrated into the "new" South Africa and Holomisa joined the African National Congress (ANC).

== National politics ==
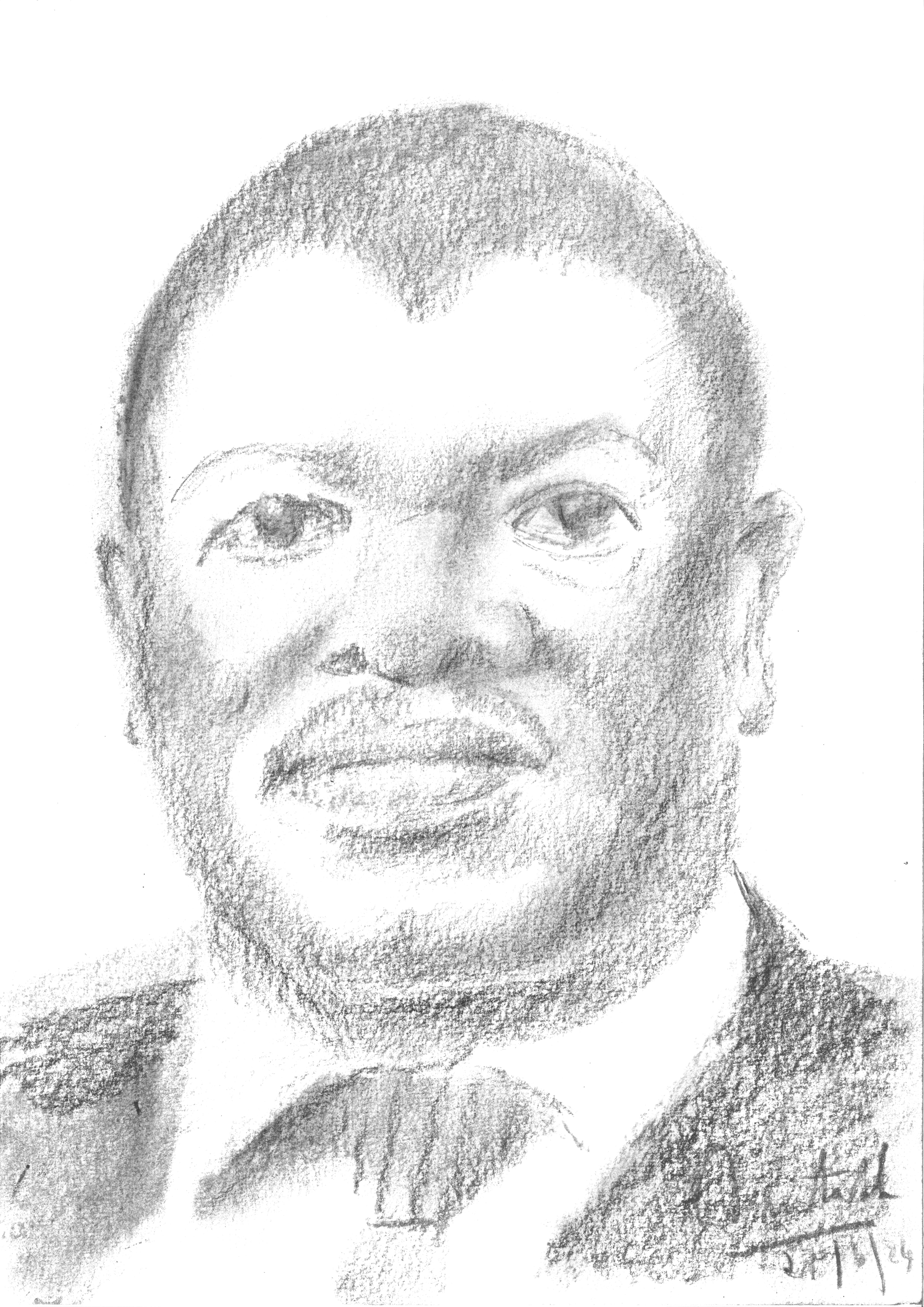
General Bantu Holomisa, President of United Democratic Movement Charcoal on Paper by Amitabh Mitra

In 1994 Holomisa was elected to the National Executive Committee of the African National Congress, and was the Deputy Minister of Environment and Tourism of South Africa.

=== Expulsion from the ANC ===
Holomisa testified to the Truth and Reconciliation Commission that Stella Sigcau should be investigated for corruption. Holomisa stated that Sigcau was involved in accepting bribes from South African hotel and casino magnate Sol Kerzner when she was minister of public enterprises in the Transkei government of George Matanzima. Instead of investigating the accusations of corruption the ANC accused Holomisa of bringing the party into disrepute. Holomisa then also accused the ANC of also accepting funds and kickbacks from Kerzner. The ANC then expelled Holomisa on 30 September 1996. Deputy president Thabo Mbeki was instrumental in pushing for Holomisa's expulsion and recommended that there was no need to investigate Sigcau for corruption even though the circumstances of Sigcau accepting money from Kerzner were not in doubt.

=== Founding of the UDM ===
Holomisa co-founded the United Democratic Movement (UDM) in 1997 with former ANC executive member John Taylor and Roelf Meyer, and was elected to parliament in 1999.

Holomisa and the UDM supported a motion of no confidence in President Jacob Zuma on several occasions, including on 8 August 2017.

== Personal life ==
Holomisa supports South African football club Kaizer Chiefs, for whom he declared his love in an interview with Radio 702 in 2015.

Political offices
| Preceded by Stella Sigcau as Prime Minister | Head of Government of Transkei; Chairman of the Military Council and of the Council of Ministers; 1987–1994 | Position abolished |
