= United Democratic Movement =

Political party in South Africa

- Abbreviation: UDM
- President: Bantu Holomisa
- Secretary-General: Yongama Zigebe
- Chairperson: Bongani Msomi
- Deputy President: Nqabayomzi Kwankwa
- Founder: Bantu Holomisa & Roelf Meyer
- Founded: 27 September 1997
- Split from: African National Congress
- Headquarters: Ground Floor; CPA House; 101 Du Toit Street; Pretoria; Gauteng
- Student wing: United Democratic Students' Movement
- Youth wing: United Democratic Movement Youth Vanguard
- Women's wing: United Democratic Movement Women’s Organisation
- Ideology: Social democracy
- Political position: Centre-left
- National affiliation: Progressive Caucus (2024)
- Colours: Yellow; Green; Red
- National Assembly seats: 3 / 400
- NCOP seats: 1 / 90
- Provincial Legislatures: 3 / 487
- Cape Town City Council: 3 / 231

Party flag

Website
- udm.org.za

The United Democratic Movement (UDM) is a centre-left, social-democratic, South African political party, formed by a prominent former National Party leader, Roelf Meyer (who has since resigned from the UDM), a former African National Congress and Transkei homeland leader, General Bantu Holomisa, and a former ANC Executive Committee member, John Taylor. It has an anti-separatist, pro-diversity platform; and supports an individualist South Africa with a strong moral sense, in both social and economic senses.

Mongameli Bobani was the Executive Mayor of the Nelson Mandela Bay Metropolitan Municipality from 2018 to 2019 and the first mayor from the UDM since the party governed King Sabata Dalindyebo Local Municipality (2000-2002).

In the 2024 general election, UDM got three seats with 0.49% of the vote in Parliament (National Assembly).

In June 2024, United Democratic Movement agreed to join the ANC-led government of national unity (GNU). Leader of the UDM, Bantubonke ‘Bantu’ Holomisa, became the Deputy Minister of Defence and Military Veterans in the Government of National Unity.

== Formation ==
=== The National Consultative Forum ===
During his testimony at the Truth and Reconciliation Commission (TRC), Holomisa made reference to a possible bribe that was paid to the former Prime Minister of Transkei, Chief George Matanzima and Miss Stella Sigcau, the then incumbent Prime Minister. Holomisa was expelled from the ANC because of these allegations. In November 1996, Holomisa publicly announced consulting South Africans on the need or not for a new political party. With this objective, the National Consultative Forum (NCF) was established on 8 February 1997.

=== The New Movement Process ===
Roelf Meyer left the National Party on 17 May 1997, along with fellow politicians Nilo Botha, Takis Christodoulou, Kobus du Plessis, and Annelizé van Wyk, some of whom had resigned their seats in the Gauteng Legislature. At a three-day strategic planning conference in May 1997, it was decided that a political movement should be established capable of unifying people around shared values across racial, historical, ideological and social dividing lines. The New Movement Process (NMP) was then established.

Bantu Holomisa and Roelf Meyer (who had met with Meyer still representing the National Party to discuss the process for a new movement) again met at Loftus Versveld, in mid-1997, to discuss working together and agreed in principle to explore the possibility of formal cooperation. A Joint Committee (JC) between the NCF and the NMP was formed to look into matters of common interest. The JC amalgamated its two (NCF and NMP) technical support teams into a Technical Committee (TC) to act as its executive body to implement the brief of the JC. This was to “look into matters of common interest between the two sides… consider… the establishment of a new party at an appropriate time… (and) in regard to the latter question… (investigate) matters of strategy, time scales, policy and funding”. The TC was jointly chaired by Kobus du Plessis (NMP) and Joel Mafenya (NCF) and its first meeting took place at the Carlton Hotel on 22 June 1997. After a joint strategic session at the Vaal Dam in July 1997 it was agreed that a new political party should be formed. The United Democratic Movement was launched at the World Trade Centre, in Kempton Park, on 27 September 1997. Bantu Holomisa was elected the party's first president at its first national congress in June 1998.

=== First elections ===
As one of several newcomer parties, UDM was among the most successful in the 1999 general election; the party garnered 3.4% and earned seats in six of the nine provincial legislatures. It also became the official opposition in the Northern Province and its stronghold, the Eastern Cape.

== Decline ==
In the 2000 municipal elections, the UDM won control of the King Sabata Dalindyebo Local Municipality. The party lost the council during the floor crossing period, however, and this would begin a time of decline; In the 2004 general election, nine members were elected to the National Assembly, five fewer than were elected in the 1999 election. The UDM lost its position as the official opposition in the Eastern Cape after two of its members in the Eastern Cape Legislature had defected to the splinter United Independent Front in 2005.

On October 8, 2008, the UDM announced its kickoff of the 2009 general election campaign. It also welcomed over 300 former members of the ANC who had left their former party following the deposition of former president Thabo Mbeki in September 2008. Almost 1,000 former African National Congress members joined the party after the ANC recalled President Mbeki and replaced him with Kgalema Motlanthe. Nevertheless, the election would continue the downward trend of the UDM, with the party retaining only four MPs with 0.8% of the vote and losing its representation in all provinces except the Eastern Cape, where it was pushed into fourth place.

In 2014, a faction of the Congress of the People led by Mbhazima Shilowa joined the UDM. This helped to strengthen the party in its Eastern Cape stronghold, where it likely gained support from many previous COPE supporters. In the 2014 general elections, UDM support remained at very low levels in eight of the provinces, and it failed to re-establish itself nationally, but made a convincing rebound in the Eastern Cape, where it overtook COPE to become the third-largest party. The increase was especially convincing in the King Sabata Dalindyebo region. However, this new growth had largely evaporated by the time of the 2016 local elections.

The general election of 2019 saw its support drop further. The UDM lost half of its seats both nationally and in the Eastern Cape, becoming the seventh-most supported party nationally, and fourth-most in the Eastern Cape. In the 2021 South African municipal elections, party support declined even further, leaving the UDM as the twelfth-most supported party nationally. In the 2024 national elections, the UDM's support remained stable, winning 0.49% of the national vote and 3 seats in Parliament.

The party recovered somewhat in the 2026 municipal elections, increasing its national vote share to 0.76%. It became the second largest party in Buffalo City, winning 19 seats, and also increased its seat count in Nelson Mandela Bay and Cape Town.

== Election results ==
=== National Assembly elections ===
Election	Party leader	Total votes	Share of vote	Seats	+/–	Government
1999	Bantu Holomisa	546,790	3.42%	14 / 400	New	in opposition
2004	Bantu Holomisa	355,717	2.30%	9 / 400	▼5	in opposition
2009	Bantu Holomisa	149,680	0.85%	4 / 400	▼5	in opposition
2014	Bantu Holomisa	184,636	1.00%	4 / 400	±0	in opposition
2019	Bantu Holomisa	78,030	0.45%	2 / 400	▼2	in opposition
2024	Bantu Holomisa	78,448	0.49% (Note: From 2024, seats in the National Assembly are determined by a combination of the national ballot, and the nine regional ballots. Only the national ballot figures are shown here.)	3 / 400	▲1	ANC–DA–IFP–PA–GOOD–PAC–VF+–UDM–RISE-ALJ coalition government

=== Provincial elections ===
Election	Eastern Cape		Free State		Gauteng		Kwazulu-Natal		Limpopo		Mpumalanga		North-West		Northern Cape		Western Cape	
Election	%	Seats	%	Seats	%	Seats	%	Seats	%	Seats	%	Seats	%	Seats	%	Seats	%	Seats
1999	13.60%	9/63	1.67%	0/30	1.95%	1/73	1.17%	1/80	2.51%	1/49	1.42%	1/30	1.29%	0/33	0.90%	0/30	2.40%	1/42
2004	9.23%	6/63	0.88%	0/30	0.99%	1/73	0.75%	1/80	1.72%	1/49	1.00%	0/30	0.96%	0/33	0.45%	0/30	1.75%	1/42
2009	4.13%	3/63	0.36%	0/30	0.40%	0/73	0.23%	0/80	0.35%	0/49	0.26%	0/30	0.51%	0/33	0.15%	0/30	0.17%	0/42
2014	6.16%	4/63	0.21%	0/30	0.44%	0/73	0.17%	0/80	0.27%	0/49	0.13%	0/30	0.88%	0/33	0.09%	0/30	0.48%	0/42
2019	2.60%	2/63	0.09%	0/30	0.21%	0/73	0.10%	0/80	0.09%	0/49	0.08%	0/30	0.30%	0/33	0.06%	0/30	0.28%	0/42
2024	3.71%	3/73	0.12%	0/30	0.19%	0/80	0.07%	0/80	0.06%	0/64	0.08%	0/51	0.24%	0/38			0.30%	0/42

=== Municipal elections ===
Election	Votes	%
2000		2.6%
2006	334,504	1.3%
2011	168,351	0.6%
2016	238,000	0.6%
2021	157,700	0.5%
2026	315,152	0.8%

== See also ==
- List of political parties in South Africa
