= Botha Sigcau =

South African politician

The Honorable King Botha Sigcau

1st President of Transkei
- In office 26 October 1976 – 1 December 1978
- Prime Minister: Kaiser Matanzima
- Preceded by: Position established
- Succeeded by: Zwelibanzi Maneli Mabandla (Acting)

Personal details
- Born: c. 1913
- Died: 1 December 1978 Umtata, Transkei
- Party: Transkei National Independence Party

King Botha Manzolwandle Sigcau (born c. 1913 – died 1 December 1978) was a King in Eastern Pondoland, Transkei, South Africa (1939–1976) and later the figurehead President of Transkei from 1976 to 1978. A graduate of the University of Fort Hare, Sigcau was an early supporter of the Bantu Authorities in Transkei and was rewarded by the South African government when he was appointed chairman of the Transkei Territorial Authority, the parliament before independence.

== Political career ==
In 1939, the government gave Botha Sigcau the chieftaincy over his half-brother, Nelson Sigcau, who the Mpondo people felt was their rightful heir. Botha Sigcau was favoured by the apartheid government because they could pay him a large salary in exchange for control of the Transkei. When the Transkei was formed in 1976, Botha Sigcau was appointed the first President of Transkei in Eastern Pondoland, South Africa. Kaiser Matanzima was his elected deputy. The area was granted self-governance under the apartheid regime. The area was known as the Republic of Transkei and it was a Bantustan, an area set aside for members of a specific ethnicity. Botha Sigcau was instrumental in writing the constitution of the Transkei.

There was popular opposition to Botha Sigcau's chieftaincy because he lacked legitimacy according to Pondo custom. Opposition also arose because Sigcau openly supported the Bantu Authorities and the National Party. There was also widespread corruption in the government appointed tribal courts of Eastern Pondoland, which Botha Sigcau ruled over. In 1958, all the Pondoland districts were invited to send representatives to a large gathering called by the Minister of Bantu Administration and Development Michel Daniel Christiaan de Wet Nel, and Botha Sigcau. In this meeting, both Nel and Sigcau promised to grant Pondo chiefs seats in local government as councillors but, in practice, Sigcau selected councillors from his own friends and supporters.

Dissent over Botha Sigcau’s leadership as president and chief came to its height during the 1960 Mpondo Revolt. A popular movement of resistance arose among the people, and although meetings were illegal, they were held just the same and attended by thousands of people, who came on foot and on horseback to chosen spots on the mountains and ridges. The demands of the people were: the withdrawal of the Bantu Authorities and Bantu Education Acts; representation in the Republic’s parliament; relief from the increased taxes and passes which hampered free movement; and the removal of Paramount Chief Botha Sigcau. The Pondos discovered that news of their meetings was reaching the magistrate. Drastic action was taken against these informers; huts were burnt down, and many of them were forced to flee from the area.

On 6 June 1960, a massacre occurred when people met to discuss their complaints. Two aircraft and a helicopter dropped tear-gas and smoke bombs on the crowd, and police vehicles approached from two directions. Although it was a peaceful gathering, 11 people died and 23 were arrested after the meeting on a charge of ‘fighting’, and of these 19 were convicted and sentenced. It is reported that Sigcau fired the first shot from the helicopter.

On 1 December 1978, a little more than two years after becoming the first President of Transkei, Botha Sigcau died of a heart attack in Umtata.

== Family ==
King Botha Manzolwandle Sigcau's daughter, Princess Stella Sigcau, was the senior member of amaMpondo Royal family, was the leader of the Transkei National Independence Party, the first female Prime Minister of Transkei in 1987, appointed in different portfolios after 1994 national elections as a Minister of Public Enterprise from 1994 to 1999, Minister of Public Works from 1999 to 2006 . King Mpondombini Thandizulu Sigcau was the eldest son of King Botha Manzolwandle Jongilizwe Sigcau who succeeded him as a King of amaMpondo in 1978. King Botha Manzolwandle's youngest son was Nkosi Ntsikayezwe Sigcau who was a traditional leader of Lwandlolubomvu Traditional Council.

Political offices
New title	President of Transkei; 1976–1978	Succeeded by Zwelibanzi Maneli Mabandla (Acting)
