= Stella Sigcau =

South African politician (1937–2006)

The Honorable Princess Stella Sigcau MP

Minister of Public Works
- In office 17 June 1999 – 7 May 2006
- President: Thabo Mbeki
- Preceded by: Jeff Radebe
- Succeeded by: Thoko Didiza

Minister of Public Enterprises
- In office 1994–1999
- President: Nelson Mandela
- Preceded by: Position established
- Succeeded by: Jeff Radebe

Member of the National Assembly of South Africa
- In office 9 May 1994 – 7 May 2006
- Succeeded by: Zipporah Nawa

3rd Prime Minister of Transkei
- In office 5 October 1987 – 30 December 1987
- President: Tutor Ndamase
- Preceded by: Dumnisani Gladstone Gwadiso (Acting)
- Succeeded by: Bantu Holomisa (Chairman of the Military Council and of the Council of Ministers)

Personal details
- Born: Stella Nomzamo Sigcau; 14 January 1937 Lusikisiki, Cape, South Africa
- Died: 7 May 2006 (aged 69) Durban, KwaZulu-Natal, South Africa
- Party: African National Congress
- Other political affiliations: Transkei National Independence Party

Stella Nomzamo Sigcau (14 January 1937 – 7 May 2006) was a South African politician. Sigcau was also the first female Prime Minister of the bantustan of Transkei before being deposed in a military coup in 1987. After Transkei was merged into South Africa following the end of apartheid, Sigcau became a minister in the cabinets of Nelson Mandela and Thabo Mbeki until her death.

== Early life and career ==
Born on 14 January 1937, Sigcau was the daughter of King Botha Sigcau of the AmaMpondo state who was a former President of the Transkei in 1976–1978. Her brothers are King Mpondombini Thandizulu Sigcau and the late ANC activist and Member of Parliament Nkosi Ntsikayezwe Sigcau. She named Nkosi Ntsikayezwe Sigcau's daughter Princess Stella Sigcau II (Founder: Lwandlolubomvu Rural Development Project) after her. Sigcau graduated from the Loveday Institute in 1954 before marrying Ronald Tshabalala in 1962.

She went on to attend the University of Fort Hare. There she joined the African National Congress Youth League (ANCYL), then graduating with a BA degree majoring in Anthropology and Psychology. She was married for a brief period, her husband Roland Tshabalala died in 1964. She taught in a number of schools in Natal during the 1960s.

== Transkei politics ==
In 1968, she was elected in Transkei representing the seat of Lusikisiki. Prior to the granting of independence, she held a number of portfolios, including energy, education and telecommunications. She was the only woman in the Transkei's cabinet. Sigcau had a frosty relationship with Prime Minister Kaiser Matanzima. Her political ideologies and associations with the ANCYL at Fort Hare were in direct opposition to Matanzima's. This she believed was the reason why she found it difficult to secure a post as a teacher in the Eastern Cape, as a result she taught in a number of schools in Natal during the 1960s. Even though Sigcau was a part of the Transkei administration, she still maintained links with the ANC, who were operating from Lusaka at the time. Her father Botha Sigcau was king of the Mpondo people, who had influence within the Transkei State. A battle for power ensued between the Mpondo chieftaincy and Matanzima's Transkei government. In 1977 she gave birth to her third child after having an affair with Chief JD Moshesh, who was also a government official. Shortly thereafter her father Botha Sigcau died from a long illness. After King Sigcau's death Matanzima was looking to consolidate his authority over the Mpondo people, and he forced Sigcau out of office. Matanzima cited Sigcau and Chief JD Moshesh's affair as a breach of code of conduct for the reasons to recall her from public office. This was met with mixed reactions, given that she was also a widowed princess at the time. After the opening of parliament in 1978 Sigcau led a floor crossing of all Pondoland MPs, and formed the Democratic Progressive Party, but two years later she re-joined the Transkei National Independence Party, which was still the ruling party at the time.

After independence, she held the portfolios of Interior Affairs and Posts and Telecommunications. She became the leader of the Transkei National Independence Party on 5 October 1987 and became the third Prime Minister of Transkei two days later. Then Prime Minister and brother to Kaiser Matanzima, George Matanzima was forced to resign from office due to corruption allegations. She defeated Kholisilie Nota and Ngangomhlaba Matanzima to the position, both of whom were male. Her term as prime minister did not last long as she was overthrown in a coup by General Bantu Holomisa. This came after Holomisa accused her government of corruption, alleging that Sigcau received bribes in exchange for gambling rights. While she denied these allegations, she conceded to accepting a bursary worth R50 000 from an official in order to pay for her daughter's tuition.

== South African politics ==
Transkei was absorbed back into South Africa after 27 April 1994. Sigcau stood for election as a candidate on the African National Congress party list and was successful. President Nelson Mandela appointed her as Minister of Public Enterprises in 1994 and she served in that role, which involved attempts at transforming the face of South African Airways and Transnet until 1999. President Thabo Mbeki then appointed her as Minister of Public Works, and she served in that capacity until her death in 2006 of heart failure.

== See also ==
- African National Congress
- Transkei

Political offices
Preceded by Dumnisani Gladstone Gwadiso (Acting)	Prime Minister of Transkei; 1987	Succeeded by Bantu Holomisa as Chairman of the Military Council and of the Council of Ministers
