= Transkei =

Bantustan in South Africa (1976–1994)

Coordinates: 31°00′S 29°00′E

Republic of Transkei iRiphabliki yeTranskei
- 1976–1994
- Flag Coat of arms
- Motto: Imbumba yamaNyama; Xhosa: Unity is Strength
- Anthem: Nkosi Sikelel' iAfrika; Xhosa: God Bless Africa
- Location of Transkei (red) within South Africa (yellow).
- Status: Bantustan (de facto) puppet state of Apartheid South Africa
- Capital: Mthatha
- Common languages: Xhosa (official) –Sesotho and English translations required for laws to come into effect –Afrikaans allowed in administration and judiciary¹
- Leader
  - 1976–1986: Chief Kaiser Daliwonga Matanzima (Nominal parliamentary democracy, effective one-party rule)
  - 1987–1994: Bantu Holomisa (Military rule)
- Legislature: Parliament
  - Parliament: President plus National Assembly (Immune to judicial review)²
  - National Assembly: Paramount Chiefs; 70 District Chiefs; 75 elected MPs³
- History
  - Self-government: 30 May 1963
  - establishment of puppet state: 26 October 1976
  - Break of diplomatic ties: 1978
  - Coup d'état: 1987
  - Foiled coup d'état: 1990
  - Dissolution: 27 April 1994

Area
- 1980: 43,798 km^{2} (16,911 sq mi)

Population
  - 1980: 2,323,650
- Currency: South African rand
Preceded by	Succeeded by
Republic of South Africa (1961–1984)	South Africa
- 1. Constitution of the Republic of Transkei 1976, Chapter 3, 16/Chapter 5, 41; 2. Constitution of the Republic of Transkei, Chapter 5, 24(4): "No court of law shall be competent to inquire into or to pronounce upon the validity of any Act."; 3. 28 electoral divisions; number of MPs per division in proportion to number of registered voters per division; at least one MP each

Transkei (/trænˈskeɪ, trɑːn-, -ˈskaɪ/ tran-SKAY, TRAHN-, -SKY, meaning the area beyond [the river] Kei), officially the Republic of Transkei (Xhosa: iRiphabliki yeTranskei), was an unrecognised state in the southeastern region of South Africa from 1976 to 1994. It was, along with Ciskei, a Bantustan for the Xhosa people, and operated as a nominally independent parliamentary democracy. Its capital was Umtata (renamed Mthatha in 2004).

Transkei represented a significant precedent and historic turning point in South Africa's policy of apartheid and "separate development"; it was the first of four territories to be declared independent of South Africa. Throughout its existence, it remained an internationally unrecognised, diplomatically isolated, politically unstable de facto one-party state, which at one point broke relations with South Africa, the only country that acknowledged it as a legal entity. In 1994, it was reintegrated into its larger neighbour and became part of the Eastern Cape province.

== History ==
=== Establishment ===
The South African government set up the area as one of the two homelands for Xhosa-speaking people in Cape Province, the other being Ciskei; it was given nominal autonomy by Prime Minister Hendrik Verwoerd in 1963. Although the first election was contested and won by the Democratic Party, whose founder Chief Victor Poto was opposed to the notion of Bantustan independence, the government was formed by the Transkei National Independence Party. Of the 109 members in the regional parliament, 45 were elected and 64 were held by ex officio chiefs.

The entity became a nominally independent state in 1976 with its capital at Umtata (now Mthatha), although it was recognised only by South Africa and later by the other nominally independent republics within the Bantustan (TBVC) system. Chief Kaiser Daliwonga Matanzima was Transkei's Prime Minister until 1979, when he assumed the office of President, a position he held until 1986.

==== International reaction ====
Prime Minister of South Africa B. J. Vorster justified the declaration of Transkei as an independent republic by referring to "the right of every people to have full control over its own affairs" and wished "Transkei and its leaders God's richest blessings on the road ahead."

My heritage commands me in the name of [Xhosa] nationhood to sacrifice the best of my abilities to the advancement of my own nation in its own country [...].

— Kaiser Matanzima

The General Assembly rejects the declaration of "independence" of the Transkei and declares it invalid.

— United Nations General Assembly

A press release by the African National Congress at the time rejected the Transkei's independence and condemned it as "designed to consolidate the inhuman policies of apartheid". During its thirty-first session, in resolution A/RES/31/6 A, the General Assembly of the United Nations referred to Transkei's "sham independence" as "invalid," re-iterated its labelling of South Africa as a "racist régime," and called upon "all [g]overnments to deny any form of recognition to the so-called independent Transkei." An article published in Time Magazine opined that, though Transkei declared independence theoretically as a "free black state", Matanzima ruled as the dictator of a one-party state. He banned local opposition parties and bought, for himself and his family, farmlands offered by the South African government at subsidised prices.

Matanzima published Independence my Way in 1976, a book in which he argued that true liberation could only be gained through a confederation of black states; he described Transkei as a positive precedent and maintained that the liberation struggle chosen by the African National Congress would not be successful.

The United Nations Security Council supported moves not to recognise Transkei, and, in Resolution 402 (1976), condemned moves by South Africa to pressure Lesotho to recognise Transkei by closing its borders with the country.

=== Troubled existence ===
Throughout its existence, Transkei's economy remained dependent on that of its larger neighbour, with the local population being recruited as workers into South Africa's Rand mines.

Because of a territorial dispute, Matanzima announced on 10 April 1978 that Transkei would break all diplomatic ties with South Africa, including a unilateral withdrawal from the non-aggression pact between the two governments, and ordered that all South African Defence Force members seconded to the Transkei Defence Force should leave. This created the unique situation of a country refusing to deal with the only internationally recognised nation it was recognised by. Matanzima soon backed down in the face of Transkei's dependence on South African economic aid.

During his rule, Matanzima arrested state officials and journalists at will; in late 1979, he detained the head of the newly formed Democratic Progressive Party, Sabata Dalindyebo, king of the Thembu people and vocal opponent of apartheid, for violating the dignity and injuring the reputation of the president. Dalindyebo went into exile in Zambia, a move that marked the end of official opposition politics in Transkei, and in the 1981 election, the ruling Transkei National Independence Party was re-elected, gaining 100% of all open seats.

Resistance to the administration intensified in the early 1980s, centred largely around student and clerical activism. This culminated in May 1984 with a peaceful student protest at the University of Transkei (UNITRA) library over the detention of SRC members. Riot police and military forces stormed the building, resulting in numerous injuries and the death of student Patricia Cele. Following the unrest, the government enforced a strict nightly curfew and a state of emergency that lasted over three years. The police state environment was further intensified following the June 1985 sabotage of the Umtata fuel depot, electricity sub-station, and water pipelines by uMkhonto weSizwe (MK). The Matanzima regime used these militant actions to justify heightened military oppression and the assassination of activists, such as Batandwa Ndondo. During this period, several prominent academics were deported and over 300 activists and students were detained. During the state of emergency an American missionary, Father Casimir Paulsen, was detained without trial for 85 days and subjected to torture.

On 20 February 1986, faced with South African evidence of corruption, Matanzima was forced to retire as president. He was succeeded by his brother George. Kaiser Matanzima was still described as Transkei's effective leader for a time, but soon the two fell out and Kaiser was temporarily detained in the Transkei gaols in 1987; upon release, he was restricted to Qamata.

In 1987, Transkei, a larger, wealthier and more populous entity, had long sought the annexation of Ciskei, and had undertaken a series of military raids on Ciskei. This included an attack on leader Lennox Sebe's compound, with the apparent goal of taking him hostage, in order to force a merger of the two Bantustans. The South African government intervened to warn the Transkei government off.

General Bantu Holomisa of the Transkei Defence Force forced the resignation and exile of Prime Minister George Matanzima in October 1987 and then overthrew Matanzima's successor, Prime Minister Stella Sigcau in a bloodless coup d'état in December 1987. Holomisa became the Head of State, and the Transkei was from that point onwards effectively in (often uneasy) alliance with the African National Congress and provided a relatively safe area for the ANC's activities. In 1990, Holomisa evaded a failed attempt to be ousted from his post, and when asked about the fate of his opponents, he claimed that they had died in the ensuing battles with TDF soldiers. It was later found that those deemed responsible for the foiled coup had only suffered minor injuries, but were subsequently executed without trial.

=== Dissolution ===
The Transkei government was a participant in the CODESA negotiations for a new South Africa. The territory was reincorporated into South Africa on 27 April 1994, and the area became part of the Eastern Cape province.

The Transkei Penal Code, 1983, applied between the Kei River and the border with KwaZulu-Natal, where persons charged with crimes were prosecuted under the code. It was repealed with effect on 2 April 2024 by the Repeal of the Transkeian Penal Code Act, 2023.

== Government and politics ==
Political parties
Party	Years
Democratic Party (DP)	1976–1979
Transkei National Independence Party (TNIP)	1976–1987
New Democratic Party (NDP)	1976–1979
Transkei People's Freedom Party (TPFP)	1976–1979
Transkei National Progressive Party (TNPP)	1978–1979
Democratic Progressive Party (DPP)	1979–1980

Nominally, the Republic of Transkei was a parliamentary democracy that allowed for a multi-party system. During its existence, six parties registered to compete in elections at different points of its history. Until the military coup of 1987, the Transkei National Independence Party remained the ruling party, while the Transkei People's Freedom Party constituted the official opposition. Because its founder, Cromwell Diko, was a former member of the ruling party, and due to its continued support of President Matanzima's policies, there is a widely held belief that it was actually initiated by Matanzima himself to give the impression of free elections when in fact there were none. Other parties that existed never gained any representation in parliament.

According to the Constitution of Transkei, parliament consisted of the president in joint session with the National Assembly and its laws and legislative decisions were immune to judicial review. Seventy-five of its members were elected by popular vote from the various districts Transkei's territory was divided into. The remaining members were unelected Paramount Chiefs and ex officio chiefs whose number per district was enshrined in the constitution.

=== Citizenship ===
With the establishment of the republic, the citizenry consisted of all those who had been holding the citizenship of the former territory of Transkei. Individuals were given no choice in this matter as the Transkeian constitution was a legally binding act; for the future, it provided citizenship regulations based on both jus sanguinis and jus soli. Citizenship by descent was given along the paternal line, regardless of a person's place of birth; in addition, any individual born within the republic's territory was eligible for citizenship, excluding those whose father held diplomatic immunity or was deemed an illegal immigrant and whose mother was a non-citizen. Dual citizenship at birth was not permitted, and renunciation of one's citizenship was legally possible, but rendered the individual stateless in most cases. In effect, the regulations thus created an almost homogeneous population of Xhosa ethnicity, though exceptions existed.

=== Flag ===
The flag of Transkei is a triband. The colours are (from the top down) ochre red, white, and green.

== Geography and demographics ==
Topographic map of the Transkei

Map of the Transkei showing districts and border changes

The Transkei consisted of three disconnected sections with a total area covering 45,000 km^{2} (17,000 sq mi). The large main section was bordered by the Umtamvuna River in the north and the Great Kei River in the south. The Indian Ocean and the Drakensberg mountain range, including parts of the landlocked kingdom of Lesotho, served as the eastern and western frontiers. A further two small sections occurred as landlocked isolates within South Africa. One of these was in the north-west, along the Orange River adjoining south-western Lesotho, and the other in the uMzimkhulu area to the east, each reflecting colonially designated tribal areas where Xhosa speaking peoples predominated. A large portion of the area was mountainous and not suitable for agriculture.

The territorial dispute with South Africa that led to the break in relations was a patch of territory called East Griqualand (which was situated between the main and eastern segments of Transkei with its northern limit at the Lesotho border). South Africa put East Griqualand under the jurisdiction of the Cape Province instead of Transkei, thus making it an exclave of the Cape Province.

The majority of the population was Xhosa-speaking, and according to the Constitution of the Republic of Transkei, Xhosa was the sole official language, but laws had to be translated into Sotho and English in order for them to come into effect, and Afrikaans was permissible in court proceedings and for other administrative purposes. In addition, many thousands of northern Transkei residents spoke a small hybrid Nguni–Sotho language, called Phuthi. (Note: Neither South Africa nor Lesotho release official statistics on the number of speakers. Its status as a language in its own right is disputed. Ethnologue lists Phuti as a dialect of Sotho, and research on the language is scarce.)

Conflicting data exist about the number of inhabitants. According to the South African Encyclopaedia, the total population of the Transkei increased from 2,487,000 to 3,005,000 between 1960 and 1970. An estimate of 1982 puts the number at about 2.3 million, with approximately 400,000 citizens residing permanently outside the territory's borders. Fewer than 10,000 individuals were of European descent, and the urbanisation-rate for the entire population was around 5%.

== Security forces ==
Flag of Transkei Defence Force

The Transkei Defence Force (TDF) was formed in October 1976 and numbered about 2,000, including one infantry battalion and an air wing with two light transporters and two helicopters. By 1993, the number of troops had risen to 4,000. Initial training was provided by the South African Defence Force, and despite its diplomatic isolation, the government of Transkei received advice from and collaborated with Israeli counterinsurgency experts. Armscor/Krygkor was its main supplier of weaponry.

After breaking all diplomatic ties with South Africa, President Matanzima announced construction-plans for an international airport by an unnamed French consortium in order for "arms and troops from other countries" to be brought into Transkei without touching South African soil, but did not elaborate on where those resources would originate.

During its last days in 1994, the Transkei Police had 4,993 police officers, operating from 61 police stations throughout the territory.

With the dissolution of Transkei in 1994, the TDF and the Transkei Police were incorporated into the South African National Defence Force and the South African Police Service, respectively.

== Notable people ==
- Nelson Rolihlahla Mandela, former president of the ANC and President of South Africa 1994–1999
- Thabo Mvuyelwa Mbeki, Co-Deputy President of South Africa 1994–1996, Deputy President of South Africa 1996–1999, President of South Africa 1999–2008
- Govan Archibald Mvuyelwa Mbeki, former South African politician and leader of the ANC and SACP
- Oliver Reginald Kaizana Tambo, anti-apartheid activist and former ANC president (1967–1991)
- Alfred Bitini Xuma, doctor and former ANC president (1940–1949)
- Ashby Solomzi Peter Mda, former political activist and member of PAC
- Donald and Wendy Woods, journalists and anti-apartheid activists born in Transkei
- D. G. M. Wood-Gush, FRSE expert on animal behaviour and father of "free-range" farming, born and raised in Transkei
- Oscar Mafakafaka Mpetha, former anti-apartheid activist, trade unionist and member of the ANC
- Walter Max Ulyate Sisulu, former anti-apartheid activist and member of the ANC
- Vuyisile Mini, former anti-apartheid activist and member of the ANC
- Robert Resha, former anti-apartheid activist and member of the ANC
- Clarence Mlami Makwetu, former political activist and member of PAC
- Vusumzi Linda Make, former political activist and member of the PAC
- John Nyathi Pokela, former political activist and member of the PAC
- Zollie Malindi, former trade unionist and anti-apartheid activist
- Mapetla Mohapi, member of the Black Consciousness Movement
- Chief Kaiser Daliwonga Matanzima, Transkei's first and longest-serving president until 1986
- Chief George Mzivubu Mathanzima, former Prime Minister of Transkei
- Bantu Holomisa, former Chief of Staff of the Transkei Defence Force 1985–1987, last Head of State of Transkei 1987–1994, South African Member of Parliament, President of the United Democratic Movement
- Chris Hani, former South African Communist Party General Secretary
- King Botha Sigcau, former President of Transkei
- King Tutor Vulindlela Ndamase, former President of Transkei
- Nkosi Ntsikayezwe Sigcau – ANC activist
- Sabelo Phama, former Azanian People's Liberation Army commander and Pan Africanist Congress of Azania member

== See also ==
- Bantustan
- Ciskei
- Diplomatic recognition
- Jongilizwe College
- List of heads of government of Transkei
- List of heads of state of Transkei
- List of historical unrecognized states and dependencies
- Pondoland
- Puppet state
- Satellite state
- Transkei Defence Force
