= Mpondomise people =

Ethnic group

Mpondomise people Ama-Mpondomise
Total population
- ~3 million

Regions with significant populations
- South Africa

Languages
- Xhosa, English

Religion
- Christianity, African Traditional Religion

Related ethnic groups
- Mpondo, Xhosa, Thembu, Swati, Zulu, Southern Ndebele Northern Ndebele and other Bantu peoples

The Ama-Mpondomise nation
- Person: i-Mpondomise
- People: Ama-Mpondomise
- Language: Isi-Mpondomise & Isi-Xhosa
- Country: Ema-Mpondomiseni

The Mpondomise people, also called Ama-Mpondomise, are a Xhosa-speaking people. Their traditional homeland has been in the contemporary era Eastern Cape province of South Africa, and during apartheid they were located Transkei region. Like other separate mostly Xhosa-speaking kingdoms such as Aba-Thembu and Ama-Mpondo, they speak Xhosa and are at times mistakenly considered as part of the Xhosa people.

The Ama-Mpondomise form part of the AbaMbo ethnic group of South Africa one of few indigenous groups of Southern Africa alongside the San and Khoekhoe. The formal establishment of the ethnic groups as a separate nation from the other local AbaMbo. They are not Nguni but some people turn to confuse them with Nguni people due to the intermarriage. Their Kingdom was established thousands of years before the European and other native tribes arrived. One of their notable kings is estimated around 13th century. The San and AmaMpondomise are the earliest residence of what was later to be renamed East Griqualand by the colonialist government of Hamilton Hope chief Magistrate. The area of Maclear did not have Griquas or Khoe descendants up until Adam Kok arrived later in the 1800s and found both the San and AmaMpondomise residing and intermarrying; in fact, one of the most notable royal clans of AmaMpondomise, the Jola/Majola clan, are descendants of the intermarriage between AmaMpondomise and the San. The Mpondomise encountered Dutch and English colonists migrating further inland and eastwards from the Cape of Good Hope.

As a result of colonial conquest, a majority of ama-Mpondomise speak Xhosa, with a minority who are bilingual speaking Isi-Mpondomise as their home language and Xhosa as a second language. Some people view Mpondomise as a dialect of Xhosa. However, the language is dying out.

== History ==
=== Origins ===
The name Mpondomise, which means "to hold your horns upright", is a descriptor for the mountainous lands that the ethnic group occupied. It is also to signify the fighting strength of the nation. The Ama-Mpondomise-People originate in traditional Southern Africa and Embo|lands in south-east Africa and the northern parts of the Western Cape. They presently reside in KwaZulu Natal, the Eastern Cape and the Western Cape. They are part of the Nguni people, being part of the greatest subdivision of the Ngunis i.e. the Aba-Mbo people. Aba-Mbo-people include some Zulus (Mkhize, Mavovo, Majola etc.), some Tswanas (Bapo), Swatis (particularly Dlaminis from which the monarch of Eswatini comes), Mpondos, Ama-Xesibe-people and the Ama-Bomvu or Ama-Bomvana are the descendants of princess Nomafu the daughter of King Sibiside. the Ama-Mpondomise-people did not migrate to Southern Africa because the region forms parts of their land. The Lebombo born that is estimated to be about 35 000 years the oldest mathematical tool in the world, which is similar to the Ishango bone found in the Lebombo border serves as proof that Abe-Nguni-people and the Ama-Mbo-people are indigenous to Southern Africa.

In the aba-Mbo-history and tradition, Ama-Mpondomise-people are seen as wise since the name metaphorically means to be dual in nature or to raise your horn: in other words, to be diplomatic but also be ready to attack (with the literal meaning being "hold your horns upright"). the Ama-Mpondomise-people are the descendants of King Mpondomise himself son of Khubazi, the grandson of King Sibiside Son of Sidwabasiluthuli who was the leader of the once-powerful Embo-nation (Aba-Mbo or Ma-Mbo). It is through King Sibiside's son Prince Khubazi Aka Njanya (the father of Prince Mpondomise & Prince Mpondo & Prince Xesibe & Prince Nyambose) so that's how the Ama-Mpondomise-nation emerged together with other Abe-Nguni-nations or ethnic groups as a force to be reckoned with. It is also through King Sibiside Son of Sidwabasiluthuli (the king of the aba-Mbo-nation and the grandfather of King Mpondomise) So that's how the Ama-Mpondomise-people are cousins to other aba-Mbo-people such as the Ama-Mpondo-people (who was King Mpondomise's the twin), Ama-Xesibe-people (born after the twins), ooMkhize and ooDlamini (regardless of Nguni affiliation, including those who are so-called "Mfengu").

Since Prince Mpondomise and Prince Mpondo were twins, there is an ongoing argument as to which twin was the eldest. The most commonly held view is that King Mpondomise is the senior twin. It is said that while out hunting, Prince Mpondo killed a lion and refused to hand over the skin to Prince Mpondomise as was the custom (the senior was entitled to skins of certain animals). The tension between the two started from that day. Prince Mpondo and his followers had to leave and settle elsewhere away from their father's land, as custom dictates that the senior inherits the father's land.

In terms of genealogy of kings, King Sibiside Son of Sidwabasiluthuli begests: (01) Prince Khubazi Aka Njanya (Ama-Mpondo-people, Ama-Mpondomise-people, Ama-Xesibe-people) (02) Prince Mavovo (father of the Mkhize-clan) King Sibiside's heir apparent (03) Princess Nomafu (daughter of Sibiside) (whose descendants are known as Ama-Bomvu or Ama-Bomvana-people)

It is worth noting that Ama-Mpondomise-people also intermarried with the San people. This can be picked up in their language that has various clicks. Evidence is also found in their clan names. The Ama-Mpondomise-people openly assert themselves as a San woman's descendants (thole loMthwakazi).

== The Ama-Mpondomise and Ama-Bhaca Conflict ==
According to Mpondomise counselor Vethe Mziziba, AmaBhaca found Ama-Mpondomise-people at Mcuthu and defeated them however the Ama-Mpodomise-people would just not submit to the letter because Ama-Bhaca-people were rather backward people who would gruesomely kill even defenseless old men women and children in times of battle, faced with this crisis Ama-Mpondomise-people appealed for help from AbaThembu, King Ngubengcuka agreed to join hands with Ama-Mpondomise-People against Ama-Bhaca-people and proceeded to cross the Tsitsa river to join them.

Both the Ama-Mpondomise-people and AbaThembu under King Ngubengcuka were defeated once again, however, after King Ngubengcuka sort a rather diplomatic approach towards the King of AmaBhaca Madzikane the war came to a halt and instead of continuing to expand, the Ama-Bhaca-people settled near Ama-Gcina for a short but peaceful period up until their eventual defeat by the combined forces of AbaThembu, AmaGcaleka, AmaQwathi, AmaMpondomise and some Irish Mercenaries who had defected from the Cape Colony.

== Ama-Mpondomise-Kingdom ==
After existing as a kingdom for over 800 years, the Ama-Mpondomise-people were stripped of their Royal status by the Union of South Africa in 1904 after King Mhlontlo Ka-Matiwane was accused of killing a Qumbu magistrate, Hamilton Hope, and two white police officers during the Ama-Mpondomise-people's Revolt in 1880–81. Although King Mhlontlo Ka-Matiwane was acquitted of the murder charge, he lost his kingship Status by administrative action. The Ama-Mpondomise-nation hopes were again dashed during the democratic dispensation when the Nhlapo Commission found in 2005 that they had no claim to a kingship. However, a 115-year battle, for this anti-colonial nation, to get their king and the kingdom reinstalled and reinstated respectively, ended when the Eastern Cape High Court (Mthatha) officially recognised the Ama-Mpondomise's-kingship. It ordered that the kingship be reinstated. With the presiding judge setting aside the Tolo Commission's decision to oppose the Ama-Mpondomise's claim of kingship.

=== Genealogy of the kings ===
The most prominent of all the kings of the Ama-Mpondomise was King Myeki. Both royal houses include him in their clan names.

- King-Mnguni-1st-(Son-of-??????????)

[=Fathered:Crowned-Prince-Yeyeye-1st=]

- King-Yeyeye-1st-(Son-of-Mnguni-1st)

[=Fathered:Crowned-Prince-Godongwane-1st=]

- King-Godongwane-1st-(Son-of-Yeyeye-1st)

[=Fathered:Crowned-Prince-Yeyeye-2nd=]

- King-Yeyeye-2nd-(Son-of-Godongwane-1st)

[=Fathered:Crowned-Prince-Godongwane-2nd=]

- King-Godongwane-2nd-(Son-of-Yeyeye-2nd)

[=Fathered:Crowned-Prince-Ntunsingana=]

- King-Ntunsingana-(Son-of-Godongwane-2nd)

[=Fathered:Crowned-Prince-Mntalaba & Prince-Mumbo & Prince-Mbhinja=]

- King-Mumbo-(Son-of-Ntunsingana)

[Fathered:Crowned-Prince-Hlumbo]

- King-Hlumbo-(Son-of-Mumbo)

[=Fathered:Crowned-Prince-Mbokane=]

- King-Mbokane-(Son-of-Hlumbo)

[=Fathered:Crowned-Prince-Mbazane=]

- King-Mbazane-(Son-of-Mbokane)

[=Fathered:Crowned-Prince-Lobamba=]

- King-Lobamba-(Son-of-Mbazane)

[=Fathered:Crowned-Prince-Lubombo & Prince-Vozana=]

- King-Lubombo-(Son-of-Lobamba)

[=Fathered:Crowned-Prince-Mbabane=]

- King-Mbabane-(Son-of-Lubombo)

[=Fathered:Crowned-Prince-Mankayane & Prince-Shlengene=]

- King-Mankayane-(Son-of-Mbabane)

[=Fathered:Crowned-Prince-Hlathikhulu=]

- King-Hlathikhulu-(Son-of-Mankayane)

[=Fathered:Crowned-Prince-Zumbane & Prince-Zambuka & Prince-Zamula & Prince-Mjakane=]

- King-Zumbane-(Son-of-Hlathikhulu)

[=Fathered:Crowned-Prince-Nhlangano=]

- King-Nhlangano-(Son-of-Zumbane)

[=Fathered:Crowned-Prince-Mbombela=]

- King-Mbombela-(Son-of-Nhlangano)

[=Fathered:Crowned-Prince-Zehlendaba=]

- King-Zehlendaba-(Son-of-Mbombela)

[=Fathered:Crowned-Prince-Gubhela=]

- King-Gubhela-(Son-of-Zehlendaba)

[=Fathered:Crowned-Prince-Khuboni=]

- King-Khuboni-(Son-of-Gubhela)

[=Fathered:Crowned-Prince-Mgebelezana & Prince-Hlamazi=]

- King-Mgebelezana-(Son-of-Khuboni)

[=Fathered:Crowned-Prince-Ndlozela & Prince-Ndizokuhle=]

- King-Ndlozela-(Son-of-Mgebelezana)

[=Fathered:Crowned-Prince-Sidwabasiluthuli & Prince-Khuwawa & Prince-Kulwamba=]

- King-Sidwabasiluthuli-(Son-of-Ndlozela)

[=Fathered:Crowned-Prince-Sibiside & Prince-Nyamuzi=]

- King-Sibiside-(Son-of-Sidwabasiluthuli)

[=Fathered:Crowned-Prince-Khubazi [•Njanya•] & Prince-Shange & Prince-Ngcongo & Prince-Hlengwa & Princess-Madlebe & Princess-Lebuka & Princess-Nomafu=]

(Born:1120-Died:1202)

[=Reigned-From:1154-Till-1202=]

- King-Khubazi-{•Njanya•}-(Son-of-Sibiside)

[=Fathered:Crowned-Prince-Chibi & Prince-Mpondo & Prince-Mpondomise & Prince-Xesibe & Prince-Nyambose=]

(Born:1151-Died:1225)

[=Reigned-From:1202-Till-1225=]

- King-Mpondomise-(Son-of-Khubazi)

[=Fathered:Crowned-Prince-Snduntu & Prince-Hlahlane & Prince-Vamba=]

(Born:1204-Died:1277)

[=Reigned-From:1224-Till-1277=]

- King-Snduntu-(Son-of-Mpondomise)

[=Fathered:Crowned-Prince-Nxunxa=]

(Born:1229-Died:1304)

[=Reigned-From:1277-Till-1304=]

- King-Nxunxa-(Son-of-Snduntu)

[=Fathered:Crowned-Prince-Bambeza=]

(Born:1263-Died:1346)

[=Reigned-From:1304-Till-1346=]

- King-Bambeza-(Son-of-Nxunxa)

[=Fathered:Crowned-Prince-Malangana=]

(Born:1291-Died:1368)

[=Reigned-From:1346-Till-1368=]

- King-Malangana-(Son-of-Bambeza)

[=Fathered:Crowned-Prince-Sikhomo=]

(Born:1322-Died:1385)

[=Reigned-From:1368-Till-1385=]

- King-Sikhomo-(Son-of-Malangana)

[=Fathered:Crowned-Prince-Hlombose & Prince-Rhudulu=]

(Born:1346-Died:1408)

[=Reigned-From:1385-Till-1408=]

- Regency-King-Rhudulu-(Son-of-Sikhomo)

[=Fathered:Crowned-Prince-Sinukaza=]

[•He was the very first regent of the Ama-Mpondomise-Kingship and Held-power for about 2 years or more while his younger brother was being groomed and initiated into the responsibility of the Kingdom as he hadn't been seen their father King Sikhomo (Son-of-Malangana) Passed away and he didn't think he would be King of the whole nation until the last minute•]

(Born:1371-Died:1439)

[=Held-Power-From:1408-Till-1413=]

- King-Hlombose-(Son-of-Sikhomo)

[=Fathered:Crowned-Prince-Ntose=]

(Born:1376-Died:1443)

[=Reigned-From:1413-Till-1443=]

[•Who was assisted by his Brother Prince-Rhudulu (Son-of-Sikhomo) led the Aba-Mbo-People movement from their third settlement in Natal/Swatini, settled near the source of a mysterious river called Dedesi. This is where they resided with the Ama-Xhosa-kingdom and the Aba-Thembu-kingdom under King-Xlazana (Son-of-Gxama) and King-Xhaphane (Son-of-Mhlamawele) respectively. The Ama-Mpondo-kingdom crossed the Mzimkhulu river first Under King-Hlambangobubende (Son-of-Shukude) and. King-Hlombose's Main-Son and Heir-Apparent of the Ama-Mpondomise-Throne at the time Prince-Ntose (Son-of-Hlombose) took over after his demise•]

- King-Ntose-(Son-of-Hlombose)

[=Fathered:Crowned-Prince-Ngcwina & Prince-Cwerha & Prince-Mpinga & Prince-Dhlombo & Prince-Debeza & Prince-Nqukhwe & Prince-Hlongothi & Prince-Gxarha & Prince-Ntsikhwe=]

(Born:1407-Died:1461)

[=Reigned-From:1443-Till-1461=]

- Regency-King-Cwerha-(Son-of-Ntose)

[=Fathered:????????=]

[•He was a regent for his younger brother King-Ngcwina (Son-of-Ntose) who was next in line to the Ama-Mpondomise-throne because their father King-Ntose (Son-of-Hlombose) died while King-Ngcwina (Son-of-Ntose) was still in a process of entering an initiation school•]

(Born:1428-Died:1493)

[=Held-Power-From:1461-Till-1464=]

- King-Ngcwina-(Son-of-Ntose)

[=Fathered:Crowned-Prince-Dosini & Prince-Cirha & Prince-Nxothwe & Prince-Nxamase & Prince-Ngcinase & Prince-Ngcitshana & Prince-Gcaga & Prince-Ngqukatha & Prince-Bhukwana & Prince-Zumbe=]

(Born:1434-Died:1498)

[=Reigned-From:1464-Till-1498=]

- King-Cirha-(Son-of-Ngcwina)

[=Fathered:Crowned-Prince-Sabe & Princess-Lodumo was the infamous (Mother-of-King-Tshawe) and the Junior-wife of King-Nkosiyamntu of the Ama-Xhosa-Kingdom=]

(Born:1469-Died:1522)

[=Reigned-From:1498-Till-1522=]

- King-Sabe-(Son-of-Cirha)

[=Fathered:Crowned-Prince-Mhlandela & Prince-Mhagana & Prince-Krhancolo & Prince-Gqwetha & Prince-Gqubusha=]

(Born:1493-Died:1545)

[=Reigned-From:1522-Till-1545=]

- King-Mhlandela-[•Mte•]-(Son-of-Sabe)

[=Fathered:Crowned-Prince-Vongeza & Prince-Ngxabane=]

(Born:1518-Died:1567)

[=Reigned-From:1545-Till-1567=]

- King-Vongeza-(Son-of-Mhlandela)

[=Fathered:Crowned-Prince-Qengeba=]

(Born:1540-Died:1592)

[=Reigned-From:1567-Till-1592=]

- King-Qengeba-(Son-of-Vongeza)

[=Fathered:Crowned-Prince-Majola [•Jongolunde•] & Prince-Tshanzi=]

(Born:1561-Died:1624)

[=Reigned-From:1592-Till-1624=]

- King-Majola-[•Jongolunde•]-(Son-of-Qengeba)

[=Fathered:Crowned-Prince-Hlazane=]

(Born:1585-Died:1653)

[=Reigned-From:1624-Till-1653=]

- King-Hlazane-(Son-of-Majola)

[=Fathered:Crowned-Prince-Ngwanya & Prince-Njomose=]

(Born:1612-Died:1675)

[=Reigned-From:1653-Till-1675=]

- King-Ngwanya-(Son-of-Hlazane)

[=Fathered:Crowned-Prince-Phahlo=]

(Born:1644-Died:1708)

[=Reigned-From:1675-Till-1708=]

- King-Phahlo-(Son-of-Ngwanya)

[=Fathered:Crowned-Prince-Sonthlo & Princess-Mbingwa & Prince-Mgabisa & Prince-Sixhuba=]

(Born:1665-Died:1732)

[=Reigned-From:1708-Till-1732=]

- Queen-Mbingwa-(Daughter-of-Phahlo)

[=Mothered:No child of her own=] or otherwise known as (Queen Mamani kaPhahlo)

[•She was the eldest daughter of King-Phahlo (Son-of-Ngwanya) out of all his Female children, she is the only one who became queen in her own right and influenced the succession of her helf-brother king-Sonthlo (Son-of-Phahlo)•].

(Born:1702–Died:1758)

[=Reigned-From:1732-Till-1758=]

- King-Sonthlo-(Son-of-Phahlo)

[=Fathered:Crowned-Prince-Mngcambe & Prince-Hlontshi=]

(Born:1718-Died:1771)

[=Reigned-From:1758-Till-1771=]

- Regency-King-Mgabisa-(Son-of-Phahlo)

[=Fathered:Crowned-Prince-Velelo=]

[•He was a regent for his nephew King-Mngcambe (Son-of-Sonthlo) who was away training in an initiation school center but then when he returned home his uncle who was the caretaker for the throne refused to hand over the reins to him then war broke out which led to his being killed in battle•]

(Born:1725-Died:1781)

[=Held-Power-From:1771–1781=]

- King-Mngcambe-(Son-of-Sonthlo)

[=Fathered:Crowned-Prince-Myeki & Prince-Gxumisa & Prince-Notshweleka & Prince-Xhoki=]

(Born:1745-Died:1807)

[=Reigned-From:1781-Till-1807=]

- Regency-King-Velelo-(Son-of-Mgabisa)

[=Fathered:Crowned-Prince-Diko=]

(He was a regent for his cousin King-Myeki (Son-of-Mngcambe) who was away in an initiation school preparing for his leadership on the Ama-Mpondomise-Throne but then same that happened with his father and great-granduncle who fought for the Throne happened to him too but than his cousin who was a caretaker for the nation fled the battle ground and escaped opening a way for King-Myeki (Son-of-Mngcambe) to take his place on the Ama-Mpondomise-throne)

(Born:1753-Died:1820)

[=Held-Power-From:1807-Till-1814=]

- King-Myeki-(Son-of-Mngcambe)

[=Fathered:Crowned-Prince-Matiwane & Prince-Mtshotsho & Prince-Mbhali & Prince-Ndamane Prince-Mcelu=]

(Born:1778-Died:1851)

[=Reigned-From:1814-Till-1851=]

- King-Matiwane-(Son-of-Myeki)

[=Fathered:Crowned-Prince-Mhlontlo & Prince-Xhabadiya & Prince-Matshiki & Prince-Noqholo=]

(Born:1802-Died:1865)

[=Reigned-From:1851-Till-1865=]

- Regency-King-Mbhali-(Son-of-Myeki)

[=Fathered:????????=]

[•He was a regent for his nephew King-Mhlontlo (Son-of-Matiwane) who was not prepared for his leadership role when his father King Matiwane (Son-of-Myeki) who was Killed by the Ama-Bhaca-People in Bettle so then his uncle held-power for him until his under the initiation process in order to sit on the Ama-Mpondomise-Throne•]

(Born:1814-died:1877)

[=Held-Power-From:1865-Till-1870=]

- King-Mhlontlo-(Son-of-Matiwane)

[=Fathered:Crowned-Prince-Tshalisi & Prince-Ntabankulu=]

(Born:1837-Died:1912)

[=Reigned-From:1870-Till-1912=]

- King-Tshalisi-(Son-of-Mhlontlo)

[=Fathered:Crowned-Prince-Sigidi & Prince-Dailza=]

(Born:1878-Died:1936)

[=Reigned-From:1912-Till-1936=]

- Regency-King-Ntabankulu-(Son-of-Mhlontlo)

[=Fathered:????????=]

[•He was a regent for his nephew King-Sigidi (Son-of-Tshalisi) because he was too young to rule Ama-Mpondomise-People so then his uncle had to hold the throne for him until he was old enough to rule on his own which he did and allowed him to take back his place on the royal sit and there was no bad blood when handing over the reins to him•]

(Born:1899-Died:1968)

[=Held-Power-From:1936-Till-1939=]

- King-Sigidi-(Son-of-Tshalisi)

[=Fathered:No child of his own=]

[•He was first to be king but than he died before he could produce his own Children so than the royal family decided give the throne to his younger brother Prince Dailza (Son-of-Tshalisi)•]

(Born:1919-Died:1962)

[=Reigned-From:1939-Till-1962=]

- King-Dailza-(Son-of-Tshalisi)

[=Fathered:Crowned-Prince-Welisha=]

(Born:1921-Died:1984)

[=Reigned-From:1962-Till-1984=]

- King-Welisha-(Son-of-Dailza)

[=Fathered:Crowned-Prince-Zwelozuko & Prince-Zwelitsha=]

(Born:1953-Died:2018)

[=Reigned-From:1984-Till-2018=]

- King-Zwelozuko-(Son-of-Welisha)

[=Fatherd:????????=]

[•He is the Current-Reigning-Monarch of the Ama-Mpondomise-people in South-Africa today in the Eastern-Cape-Province)•] or otherwise known as (Luzuko)

(Born:1978-Alive:Aging)

[=Reigning-Since:2018-Till-Present-Date=]

Prince Luzuko is yet to ascend the throne. His coronation has been delayed by the Ama-Dosini-Royal-family Branchline's unsuccessfully contest for the succession.

- Prince Dosini's descendants in terms of the Ama-Mpondomise-Kingship claimants were: King-Ngcwina-(Son-of-Ntose)

He-Fathered=Chief-Dosini-(Son-of-Ngcwina) He-Fathered=Chief-Nqabashe-(Son-of-Dosini) He-Fathered=Chief-Nceleduna-(Son-of-Nqabashe) He-Fathered=Chief-Mqhorana-(Son-of-Nceleduna) He-Fathered=Chief-Mjoko-[=Hala=]-(Son-of-Mqhorana) He-Fathered=Chief-Shwemela-(Son-of-Mjoko) He-Fathered=Chief-Xhonto-(Son-of-Shwemela) He-Fathered=Chief-Zanoxolo-(Son-of-Xhonto) He-Fathered=Chief-Xhuxhe-(Son-of-Zanoxolo) He-Fathered=Chief-Marule-(Son-of-Xhuxhe) He-Fathered=Chief-Mxoko-(Son-of-Marule) He-Fathered=Chief-Gxaba-(Son-of-Mxoko) He-Fathered=Chief-Nyakatya-(Son-of-Gxaba) He-Fathered=Chief-Ncilashe-(Son-of-Nyakatya) He-Fathered=Chief-Sigiwili-(Son-of-Ncilashe) He-Fathered=Chief-Masethi-(Son-of-Sigiwili) (from whom this royal family derives its surname) He-Fathered=Chief-Ntamnani-(Son-of-Masethi) He-Fathered=Chief-Myezo (Son-of-Ntamnani) He-Fathered=Chiefness-Ntombenkonzo (Daughter-of-Myezo). Chiefness-Ntombenkonzo is the current claimant from this line. She has lost the case in court -see court papers in references

== Language ==
Colonists wrongly identified Mpondomise as Xhosa. Some colonists later identified Mpondomise as a dialect of Xhosa. Consequently, ama-Mpondomise people had to learn and speak Xhosa fluently to conduct business. Contemporarily, Mpondomise people speak Xhosa as a home language or as a second language in order to conduct business since Mpondomise is not recognised as an official language of the Republic of South Africa. There is a minority, comprising mostly older people, who speak the language. They are concentrated in the far eastern part of the Eastern Cape, primarily in the OR Tambo District Municipality, in the Tsolo and Qumbu villages where the great house and right-hand house reside, respectively. Other languages similar to Mpondomise include Swati, Ndebele and the various Tekela languages of nations such as ama-Mpondo, Ama-Hlubi and Ama-Zizi.

Ama-mpondomise are learning Xhosa at schools and are required to select Xhosa as their preferred language on official documents such as government forms. Consequently, they are slowly losing their language. This is also evident in that ama-Mpondomise linguistically identify themselves with their cousins, ama-Xhosa, as Xhosa speaking people; while retaining a separate ethnic identity as ama-Mpondomise.

== Mpondomise clans and tributary clans ==
The Mpondomise people comprise various clans. First are clans that arise out of the many houses of the kings. Second are clans of the older Aba-Mbo nation from which Mpondomise was born out. Therefore, clan names are indicative of people's ancestors (or dynasties and cadet branches). Third, there are clans or ethnic groups who have immigrated to the kingdom of the Mpondomise and now pay tribute to the Mpondomise kingdom.

In more detail

- From Zumbe – Ngcwina, Mabhula, Ndalane kaNdodi, Mnxothi, Siqwephu Solusu, Nyama yangaphakathi, Nyama Emdaka ethandwa ngamafazi, Mntwana wenkosi uNgcwina, Simanga sekati Edla Amanqathe odwa.Malilelwa zintombi, zibona iintongo zithi ziipesika, OoNtongo zosulwa ngababathandayo, Amangcingwane, Mpondomise.
- From Bhukwana – ooMbara, Mtshobo, Phaphulengonyama, Into ezingaphathwa mntu ngoba zizinkosi ngokwazo
- From Debeza – OoDebeza, ngoJebe, Nonyanya, Nongoqo, Mbeka Ntshiyini Bathi uqumbile, Khonkcoshe Mbokodo engava mkwetsho
- From Dosini – ooDosini, Ncele, Ntose, Nqabashe, Ngcelenduna, Mqhorhana, Ngxow'inoboya, uNoyiila, uNogqaz'unthonyama, isihlobo sikaMthimkhulu, sikaBhungane yena mntu ungaphezulu nakuThixo kuba abantu ubanike amabele, Ingqoq'enebal, Ngwanya kaMajola, uMajola inyoka enothando kuba ityelela abafazi endlwini (The royals of the Mpondomise, the right-hand house).
- From Gxarha – Gxarha -Cwerha, Vambane, Mahlahlana, Mlawu, Potwana, Siyoyo
- From Jola – SingaMampondomse ngohlanga (i.e. we are ethnically Mpondomise), ooJola, ooJoliNkomo, ooMphaNkomo, ooQengeba, OoNgwanya, Nomakhala, Njuza, S'thukuthezi, sithandwa mhla kukubi, Hoshode, Hakaha, mfaz' obele 'nye omabele made, oncancisa naphesheya komlambo (The royals of the Mpondomise, the great house). The South African politician, Fikile Mbalula is from this clan.
- From Mpehle – amaMpehle, Vengwa, Dikana, Cabashe, Nohushe
- From Mpinga – ooMpinga, Mawawa, Mbala kaNkqoshe, Mpondomise, Ntose, Nto'mntwana, Ngwangwashe, uSenzwa, Sineka, Mbetshane, Hlahla lamsik' unntu esendeni, Ngceza, Sintila, Nyaw'zinoshukela, mzukulu kaSityulu, kheth'omthandayo, yazi b'inobaya ifanelwe ngabafana. This is the clan of Enoch Sontonga, the author of "Nkosi Sikelel' iAfrika", part of the National Anthem of Republic of South Africa.
- From Nxasana – NguSikonza, uNxasana, uTotoba, uDunjane, uMalilelwaziintombi zithi ndizeke, adinamama andinatata, uBhili, uMagazo, uLunguza, gastyeketye umbona obomvu othandwa ngabantwana
- From Nxotwe – ooNxotwe, Gabazi, Qamkazi, Mfuza afulele okwelifu lemvula, Mpondomise
- From Nxuba – ooNxuba, Mduma, Rhudulu, Mngcengane
- From Skhoji – (Inzala ka William Saunders wase Scotland)
- From Skhomo – ooUmntu womlambo, Tshangisa, Mhlatyana, Rhudulu, uNxub’ongafiyo ofa ngokuvuthelwa, Mngwevu, Jola, Manz’amnyama, Qengebe, Mhaga
- From Zongozi – ooSenzela ooPhondo liyagexeza (bazalwa nguNtose kaCirha ikumkani yama-Mpondomise, hayi lo wama-Xhosa)

There are tributary clans such as:

- Nyathi uMsuthu, uMphuthi, uRhahla, uRhabani, uTsiki, uNhose; Oogaxel’umbengo, boya beNyathi, Amathol’enkomo zikaNyathi, abeSuthu, ebePhuth'ephuthini! Oozishuba zimdakana phesheya komlanjana wegqili, Izilwana zona zehla ezintabeni ngeziluluthwana, Nje ngoko namagama ezixela ziintsuthu ezi ngobuhlanga” sithetha ngenzala ka Nose (Nhose) kubafazi bakhe abathathu kuMawushe, uMatshezi naye umaMhlwane. Esikhoyo isikululwana sesabo oonyana neenkulu zakhe, uQhaziyana uGeorge kwa noLanga. Ziintsuthu zaseQuthini (Sotho) ngokomlandu kodwa ngenxa yemfuduko/ mfeguza zokhokho bafumaneka Eastern Cape kuTsolo kwela maMpondomise eMcwangele [amaMpondomise ngokuma]

== Culture and religion ==
Among the Mpondomise people, most practise African religions alongside Christianity. African religions encompass ancestral worship (or veneration) and sometimes some Totemism in which a spiritual meaning is attached to some animals and plants, which may be deified. For Mpondomise people this is uMajola (mole snake). This snake is revered and venerated. They believe that it visits a newborn "to prepare it for a successful and safe adult life. It comes as a friend and protector. The friendship it expresses is not anchored in a benign demonstration of goodwill but rather an active expression of solidarity and striving to support and encourage long-term success of the young and growing members of the human race." A visitation from uMajola signifies good fortune. It also means the ancestors are showing their favour on the visited people or family. Killing the snake is believed to have severe physiological and psychological consequences. This last part is central to the plot of the famous Xhosa novel Ingqumbo yeminyanya ("The Wrath of the Ancestors"). The snake is common in South Africa in the provinces where generally abaMbo (and by extension amaMpondomise) mostly reside: KwaZulu-Natal, the Eastern Cape and the Western Cape.

== Notable people ==
- Butana Komphela – South African politician.
- Steve Komphela – South African football manager and a former footballer.
- Fikile Mbalula – South African politician.
- Jabu Mbalula – South African politician and diplomat.
- Raymond Mhlaba – South African politician and first Premier of the Eastern Cape.
- Thulas Nxesi – South African politician.
- Enoch Sontonga – South African composer of the national anthem.
- Mvuyo Tom – South African doctor, administrator and academic.
- Selby Mbenenge – South African judge, he is currently Judge President of the Eastern Cape Division of the High Court of South Africa.

== See also ==
- List of current constituent African monarchs
- Mpondo people
- Xhosa people
- Xhosa clan names
