= Cadet branch =

Male-line descendants of a monarch's younger sons

A cadet branch or branch family consists of the male-line descendants of a monarch's, lord's or clan patriarch's younger sons (cadets). In the ruling dynasties and noble families of much of Europe and Asia, the family's majority assets (realm, titles, fiefs, estates, land tenures, private properties and income) have historically been passed from the father to his eldest living legitimate son (known as the firstborn heir) in what is known as primogeniture; younger legitimate sons, i.e. the cadets, generally inherited much less wealth and authority (such as a small appanage) to pass on to future generations of their descendants, but carry the family name as kins of the extended family. Cadet branches are still eligible to claim the assets of the primogeniture household — known as the main branch — if the latter die out or end up heirless.

In families and cultures in which that was not the custom or law, such as the feudal Holy Roman Empire, the equal distribution of the family's holdings among male members would often eventually fragment the inheritance, rendering it too small to sustain the descendants at the socio-economic level of their ancestors, and too small to efficiently manage or effectively defend. Moreover, brothers and their descendants sometimes quarreled over their allocations, or even became estranged. While agnatic primogeniture became a common way of keeping the family's wealth intact and reducing familial disputes, it did so at the expense of younger sons and their descendants. Both before and after a state legal default of inheritance by primogeniture, younger brothers sometimes vied with older brothers to be chosen as their father's heir or, after the choice was made, sought to usurp the elder's birthright.

== Status ==
In such cases, primary responsibility for promoting the family's prestige, aggrandizement, and fortune, fell upon the senior branch for future generations. A cadet, having less means, was not expected to produce a family. If a cadet chose to raise a family, its members were expected to maintain the family's social status by avoiding derogation (embarrassment), but could more easily pursue endeavors considered too demeaning or too risky for the senior branch—for example, emigration to another sovereign's realm, or to a colony; engagement in commerce, or in a profession such as law, religion, academia, military service or government office.

Some cadet branches came, eventually, to inherit crown of the senior line. For example, the Bourbon Counts of Vendôme mounted the throne of France (after civil war) in 1593; the House of Savoy-Carignano succeeded to the kingdoms of Sardinia (1831) and Italy (1861); the Counts Palatine of Zweibrücken obtained the Palatine Electorate of the Rhine (1799) and the Kingdom of Bavaria (1806); and a deposed Duke of Nassau was restored to sovereignty in the Grand Duchy of Luxembourg (1890).

In other cases, a junior branch came to eclipse more senior lines in rank and power, e.g. the Electors and Kings of Saxony who were a younger branch of the House of Wettin than the Grand Dukes of Saxe-Weimar.

A still more junior branch of the Wettins, headed by the rulers of the small Duchy of Saxe-Coburg and Gotha, would, through diplomacy or marriage in the 19th and 20th centuries, obtain or consort and sire the royal crowns of, successively, Belgium, Portugal, Bulgaria and the Commonwealth realms. Also, marriage to cadet males of the Houses of Oldenburg (Holstein-Gottorp), Polignac, and Bourbon-Parma brought those dynasties patrilineally to the thrones of Russia, Monaco, and Luxembourg, respectively. The Dutch royal house has, at different times, been a cadet branch of Mecklenburg and Lippe(-Biesterfeld). In the Commonwealth realms, the male-line descendants of Prince Philip, Duke of Edinburgh are cadet members of the House of Glücksburg.

It was a risk that cadet branches maintaining legal heirs could sink in status because of shrunken wealth that was too meagre to survive the shifting political upheavals (legal mechanisms in factionalism or revolution of attainder, capital offences and show trials) as much as unpopularity or distance from the reigning line.

- The Capetian branch of the princes de Courtenay's last 'prince' died in 1733 without recognition by the crown as dynastic princes du sang despite having undisputed but remote male-line descent from Louis VI of France.
- The Grüningen-Landau family (a sideline of the Counts of Württemberg), whose ancestor, Hartmann I of Württemberg/Grüningen, was granted the Reichssturmfahne ("Imperial War Flag"), or, rather, the prestigious right to keep it as official bearer (so-called bannerer) by the German king William of Holland as an imperial fief, along with the city and castle of Markgröningen. This made him one of the senior imperial vassals in Swabia. However, the Reichssturmfahne and Markgröningen were taken away from the family by King Rudolf I as part of his policy of recovery of imperial goods. Hartmann I's heirs then retreated to one of his minor seats, Landau Castle, over the Danube. Successive generations gradually lost their importance and landholdings, which was most evident in the disappearance of use of their ancestral comital title. Eventually being forced to sell the last parts of their inheritance, the Grüningen-Landaus settled in Lower Austria and were socially demoted to the rank of lower nobility. In 1336, the prestigious imperial office/position of bearer of the Reichssturmfahne was eventually granted to their mighty kinsman, Ulrich III, Count of Württemberg, thus returning to the family.
- The principi di Ottajano (of the House of Medici) were heirs to the grand duchy of Tuscany when the last male of the more senior branch died in 1737, but they were bypassed by intervention of Europe's major powers, which allocated the title instead to Francesco II Stefano, of the House of Habsburg-Lorraine.
- The Romanovs, the house which dominated Russia's throne (owing to their kinship-by-marriage to tsar Ivan the Terrible) from 1613 to the end of monarchy, became reluctant to admit their descent from the 9th century founding ruler Rurik after 1880, when Tsar Alexander II wed Catherine Dolgorukov, a Rurikid princess. That was partly so that later cadet children could be sidelined and partly because the marriage was deemed morganatic, as Alexander had long been involved with Catherine as his mistress.

== Notable cadet branches ==
- House of York: A branch of the House of Plantagenet who were twice-descended from Edward III of England, cognatically through his second son and agnatically though his fourth son. Over the course of the Wars of the Roses (1455–1485), they displaced the agnatically senior line of Plantagenets, the Lancaster branch who were descendants of Edward III's third son, on the English throne (1461), only to be finally displaced themselves by a Lancastrian cognatic descendant, Henry Tudor, Earl of Richmond, who obtained the crown by conquest from Richard III (August 1485). As Henry VII, he took as queen consort the heiress of the cadet branch, Elizabeth of York, in January 1486. Their son, Henry VIII, thus united in his person and on the throne of England both branches of the Plantagenets, and inaugurated the House of Tudor, which ruled England until 1603 when Elizabeth I died childless. From there, the crown went to the House of Stuart who were cognatically descended from Henry VII and Elizabeth of York through their eldest daughter Margaret Tudor.
- House of Schleswig-Holstein-Sonderburg-Glücksburg: descendants of a younger son of King Christian III of Denmark (of the House of Oldenburg), who eventually became monarchs of Denmark, Norway and Greece.
- House of Bourbon: descendants of a younger son of Louis IX of France who, in the person of Henry IV of France, inherited the throne of France from the senior Capetian line of the Valois in 1589 and from which sprang the Bourbon kings of Spain (including the Carlist and French legitimist lines), the kings of the Two Sicilies, and the sovereign Dukes of Parma, who currently reign in the Grand Duchy of Luxembourg in a cadet line. Also from the Bourbon Louis XIII descends the cadet branch known as the House of Orléans, to which the Citizen-king Louis-Philippe, the Orleanist claimants to the throne of France (Jean, Count of Paris) belong, as does the House of Orleans-Braganza.
- House of Gonzaga: the noble family which reigned in Mantua counted in its dynasty some cadet branches.
- House of Guise: although the Dukes of Lorraine exercised continental independence, they were nominally vassals of the Holy Roman Emperors, and their geopolitical importance resided less in the size of their realm than in their crucial location between the competing French and German nations. A younger brother of Duke Antoine, Claude of Lorraine, was appanaged with the lordship of Guise in France and betook himself to the French court in search of his fortune. There, he was granted the title Duke of Guise as a member of the Peerage of France, he and his male-line descendants henceforth being accorded the rank of prince étranger. As the Calvinist form of Protestantism spread widely among the nobility and mercantile class of France, Claude's descendants embraced the Counter-Reformation and formed the Catholic League to prevent a Protestant monarch from inheriting or seizing the throne of the last Valois kings. Their leadership of the League infused the Guises with unequalled power in French politics. Their leadership role during the French Wars of Religion further extended their influence in European affairs until the accession of the House of Bourbon to the throne in 1593 and was far beyond that of their senior cousins, reigning in Nancy.
- Mandela: Nelson Mandela, the late president of the Republic of South Africa, was a male-line great-grandson of King Ngubengcuka of the Thembu nation of Southern African Xhosas. Be that as it may, he was—and his fellow members of the Mandela branch of the Thembus' ruling royal AmaHala dynasty are—ineligible to succeed to the ancestral throne because all of them descend from Ngubengcuka's morganatic marriage to a woman of a ritually inferior family. As such, their traditional role in the kingdom is that of hereditary privy counsellors to Thembu monarchs that are unable to succeed to the throne themselves. In addition, the family's recognised leader, Chief Mandla Mandela, also serves by tradition as the tribal chieftain of Mvezo under the authority of his relative the paramount chief of Thembuland, currently King Buyelekhaya Dalindyebo.
- Spencer: the comital branch of the Spencer family descended from John Spencer, the youngest son of Charles Spencer, 3rd Earl of Sunderland and Lady Anne Churchill. The couple's eldest son, Robert, inherited his father's title of Earl of Sunderland. When Robert, 4th Earl of Sunderland, died without an heir, his paternal titles passed to his younger brother, Charles, who later inherited the title of Duke of Marlborough upon the death of his aunt Henrietta, and became the 3rd Duke of Marlborough. Charles's descendants (later known as the Spencer-Churchills) became the senior branch of the Spencer family. His younger brother, John, had an only son, also named John, who became the 1st Earl Spencer. From the line of the Earls Spencer descend many prominent figures, including Diana, Princess of Wales, whose son William, Prince of Wales, is heir to the Crown of the United Kingdom.
- Wellington: Arthur Wellesley, the younger brother of Richard Wellesley, the 2nd Earl of Mornington, started his career as a protégé of his older brother. He entered the military, a traditional occupation of younger sons. From 1809 to 1814, he won a series of very significant victories, and was awarded a series of ascending titles; Baron Douro, Viscount Wellington, Earl of Wellington, Marquess of Wellington and finally Duke of Wellington. A descendant of Baron Cowley, youngest brother of Richard Wellesley, became Earl of Cowley in the Peerage of the United Kingdom, his junior line of the family thereby also achieving a higher status than that of the Earldom of Mornington, in the Peerage of Ireland.
- In the case of the House of Saud, the surname "Al Saud" is carried by any descendant of Muhammad bin Saud or his three brothers: Farhan, Thunayyan, and Mishari. Al Saud's other family branches, like the Al Kabir, the Al Jiluwi, the Al Thunayan, the Al Mishari and the Al Farhan, are the cadet branches. Members of the cadet branches hold high and influential positions in government, but they are not in line of succession to Saudi throne. Many cadet members intermarry within the Al Saud to re-establish their lineage and continue to wield influence in the government. Sons, daughters, patrilineal granddaughters and grandsons of Ibn Saud are referred to by the style "His Royal Highness" (HRH), differing from those belonging to the cadet branches, who are called "His Highness" (HH) and in addition, a reigning king has the title of Custodian of the Two Holy Mosques.
- In the Muhamamdzai dynasty of Afghanistan, the address as Sardar (Prince) is referred to all descendants of Payindah Muhammad Khan the patriarch of the Muhamamdzai Dynasty. Cadet branches of the Muhammadzai are defined by the respective son of Payindah Muhammad through which a prince descends. The cadet branches include the Telai, the descendants of Sultan Mohammed Khan to which King Zahir Shah, Prince Daoud Khan and Professor Prince Abdul Khalek belonged; the Seraj, descendants of Dost Mohammed Khan to which King Amanullah Khan belonged and the Shaghasi, descendants of other children of Payindah Muhammad Khan to which Loynab Shir Dil and Prince Ali Khan Shaghasi belonged.

== See also ==
- Secundogeniture
