= Thembu =

Xhosa speaking people based in South Africa

Thembu people AbaThembu
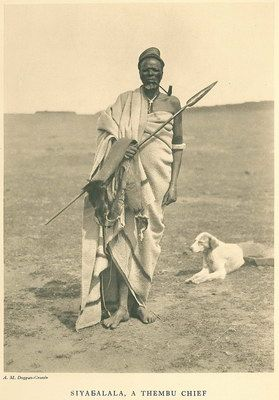
- Siyaɓalala, chief of the Ndungwana clan of the Thembu, c. 1930s

Total population
- 3.3 million 2023

Regions with significant populations
- South Africa; Lesotho

Languages
- IsiXhosa; Sesotho, English; Historically ǀXam

Religion
- Christianity, uThixo

Related ethnic groups
- Xhosa, Mpondo, Swati, Zulu, Mpondomise, Xesibe, Bhaca, Mfengu, Basotho, Khoisan

The Thembu
- Person: UmThembu
- People: AbaThembu
- Language: IsiXhosa
- Country: EbaThenjini

The Thembu (Xhosa: AbaThembu) are a isiXhosa-speaking nation that inhabited the Kingdom of Thembuland. They were established around the 16th century as one of the federations in what became the apartheid era Transkeian territories. The federation was later annexed by the British Empire shortly after the death of King Sarhili.

According to Xhosa oral tradition, the Hala clan migrated along the east coast of southern Africa before settling in KwaZulu-Natal. The earliest known Thembu ancestor is Chief Mbulali Ka-Nanzinzaba, whose grandson (named uMthembu KaNtongakazi), led his people from what became the South African province of KwaZulu-Natal to Dedesi in the present-day Eastern Cape region of South Africa. The Thembu emerged as a single political entity during the reign of Nxeko, who settled in Dedesi and was awarded chieftainship by King Togu, who later handed him independence to form a new Xhosa state. Famous descendants of Nxeko include members of the royal line of the Xhosa Kingdom and politicians like Nelson Mandela, whose father was a reigning nobleman from a junior branch of the AmaMadiba clan of kings, and Walter Sisulu.

== Name ==
In Xhosa, the name is abaThembu (aba- is a common prefix implying "people"). The territory of the Thembu state was historically known as Thembuland.

In the 19th century, the Thembu were frequently known as the "Tamboekie" or "Tambookie" people. This name was originally the Khoisan language term specifically for the followers of Chief Maphasa, who moved into the area west of the Great Kei River in the 1820s. However, Europeans used these terms as synonyms for "Thembu" for much of the 19th century.

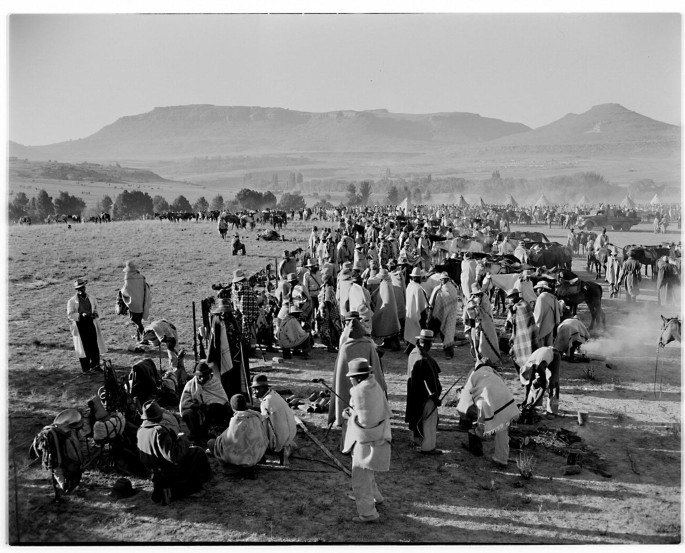

== Origin ==
The Thembu people were known as 'ǀXam bu ǃe' , 'ǀXam', and 'the Embo people'. In Xhosa, ǀXam bu ǃe translates to 'Thembu'.

AbaThembu is derived from 'ǀXam ka ǃue'. 'ǀXam' means an oryx or an antelope. The original name of AbaThembu was 'ǀXam ka ǃeten' (Antelope water people). In Khoemana, the word exists as 'ǀehem'.

AbaThembu spoke ǀXam or ǀXam ke (an extinct language). The Basotho used to call the Eastern Cape "Bathebu ke ing ke ma ǀXam" since it was known as an ǀXam area. There is no historical evidence of AbaThembu descending from Central Africa, but there is proof of a minority of them ascending to Central Africa due to Shaka's expansion known as 'Imfecane' (The Crushing).

== ǀXam and Thembu history ==
The town of ǂKhomani, now known as Queenstown, used to be called ǀXam land, then ǀXam land later became Thembuland. ǂkhomani people still exist in the Kalahari (ǃkung ra ma ba), which is Upington, Eastern Cape, used to be a Cape Colony. Queenstown (now called Komani) is named after Komani of the Zima clan who lived on the site before white settlers. AmaQoma, Qoma means (A tree where a lion would rest). The Ntsundu people are Nǀuu people; they exist in the Northern Cape, Free State and Kalahari.

The name 'Thembu' directly translates to ǀXam bu ǃe. ǀXam intermarried with Abambo a minority, not the majority of Abambo they build a relationship with them, that's why today the ǀXam bu ǃe, ǃe is a suffix when people say AbaThembu it is a Xhosa language it's not a Indigenous language in Transkei they speak a different type of dialect which is not their own original dialect it's a diversified dialect that kept connection with Abambo people. The original Thembus spoke five to six dialects.

Thembus always praises a phrase called Sopitso or Yem-Yem, which means (ǀXam - ǀXam), it connects all the Madiba, Dlomo, Nxongo, and Qwithi people.

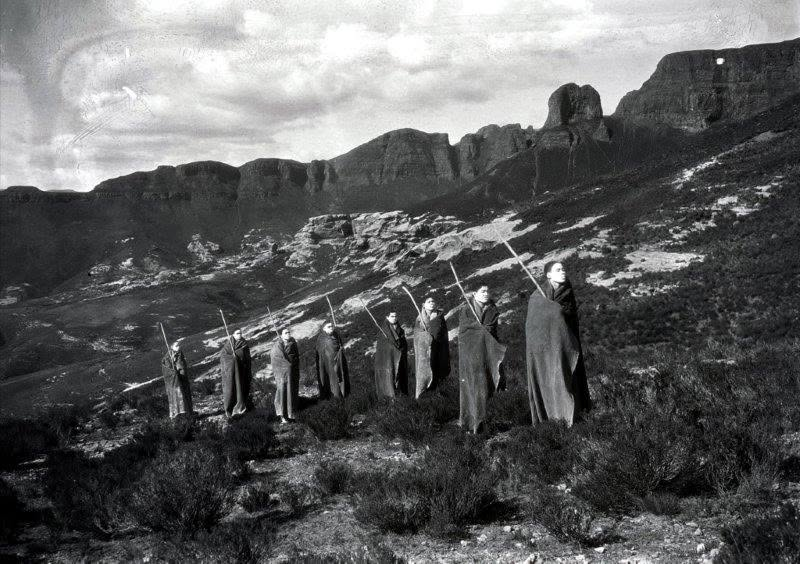
Ulwaluko

== Mvelase ==
The Mvelase people belong to the AbaThembu nation. Their history as a distinct and noble group begins with King Mthembu (Thembu), the foundational patriarch of the AbaThembu people. The nation experienced a monumental historical split through King Mthembu’s two sons Ndilo and Mvelase. While Ndilo migrated southwards with a large part of the community to Eastern Cape founding the Royal lineage that would later integrate into the greater Xhosa speaking frontier Mvelase remained in the north Consequently, Mvelase became the founding father of the AbaThembu branch that rooted themselves deeply within the KwaZulu-Natal (KZN) region, specifically around areas such as Qhudeni and Msinga For generations, the Mvelase people maintained their sovereign identity as the AbaThembu bakwaMvelase. It was only during the 19th-century expansion and consolidation of the Zulu Kingdom under King Shaka that the Mvelase people were geographically and politically integrated into the Zulu nation. While they are often classified as Zulu today due to modern linguistic and provincial boundaries, their true, original bloodline is entirely AbaThembu.

The Mvelase people do not originate from the Zulu clan they are originally a core, royal branch of the AbaThembu nation, descended directly from the son of King Mthembu originally they are not Zulus.

=== The Shared Blood of Mthembu ===
The Xhosa nation is not just a single lineage, but a large federation built by integrating prominent kingdoms, with the AbaThembu nation serving as one of its largest pillars. When Ndilo (Mvelase’s brother) led his section of the AbaThembu to the Eastern Cape, those people flourished, integrated linguistically and culturally with the Xhosa, and eventually became recognized as a core part of the broader Xhosa nation.

=== The Connection to the Madiba Royal House ===
This historical reality means that the Mvelase people of KZN and the AbaThembu of the Eastern Cape (from whom the Madiba clan and King Nelson Mandela emerge) are descended from two biological sons of the same father, King Mthembu. Therefore, a Mvelase person shares a direct genetic and ancestral link to the royal bloodlines of the AbaThembu who comprise the Xhosa nation today.

=== Conclusion on the Relationship ===
This confirms that the Mvelase people are significantly closer by heritage and DNA to the Xhosa nation (via their shared Thembu identity) than they are to the original Zulu clan. Their lineage connects directly to the royal houses of the Transkei and the Eastern Cape through their founding ancestors.

== History ==
AbaThembu is a nation independent of AmaXhosa, from the eMboǀAba-Mbo Empire. Zwide (not to be confused with Zwide kaLanga) was the first man to leave eMbo, and he begot Malandela (not of AmaZulu years before), who settled in Mozambique, who begot Mbulali, who begot Njanye, who begot Mthembu.

Mthembu settled with his people in a place known as Mbabane in Swaziland and then went to KwaMsinga in Natal, where he got two sons, Ndilo and Mvelase, also known as Qudeni. He founded the tribe known as Abathembu BakwaMvelase. Ndilo left and died in a place known as Msana in the Eastern Cape. Ndilo's sons were Ntongakazi (dumakazi), Bhomoyi, Mncotshe, Mdlane, Qoma, and Jali. The houses of Mdlane and Jali, Qoma, and Mncotshe were unimportant because their mothers were commoners. The only houses that were respected were the houses of Bhomoyi and Ntongakazi, also known as Dumakazi; both their mothers came from Royal houses.,

Bhomoyi left Msana for Lesotho to a place known as Qacha's Nek, he got into a battle with the Basothos and won his newfound land when Bhomoyi confiscated land Basotho came to ask him to leave so that they could continue to farm on their land Bhomoyi replied (Andizuhamba de ndizobe ndibhentselwa zintombi zabesotho), meaning I won't leave until I'm awarded young Basotho women, the messenger went back to the Basotho King and returned with fifteen Basotho women, this is where Isiduko Zabathembu got the phrase (VelaBembhentsele). Bhomoyi begot Ceduma, who begot Mguti, who begot Mngxongo and a daughter named Khazeka, whose mother came from the Mpondo royal family, and who begot Ntoyi in the right-hand house, whose mother was a commoner.

Khazeka is one of the two woman names mentioned in the history of AbaThembu because of their fearlessness and victories in unifying and stabilizing the Kingdom. Amagorhakazi esizwe saBathembu.

One day, Mtshutshumbe's section of AmaXesibe had to pass by the land of AbaThembu to reach AmaGcaleka. But because AbaThembu namaXesibe had some history, Mtshutshumbe decided to hide his Xesibe identity by calling his people AmaQwathi, named after a cow used at his graduation from initiation school.

After arriving, they presented a cattle tribute to Mnguti in exchange for land, which they got from eNgcobo. Mguti then told his son Mngxongo to confiscate their land, and when he had done so, amaQwathi gave him cattle that were all black, which is preserved in iziduko zamaNgxongo Ntsundu (these were the cattle's colors).

It then happened that Mngxongo didn't return, and his father, Mguti, got lost searching for him to crown him the next King. He drowned with his dogs in the Qethume River.

Mngxongo's heir was Mphosesebeni, but the royal family refused his place on the throne. To this day, when Mguti and Mngxongo's names are mentioned, it gets awkward ebaThenjini because the rightful king was overlooked.

Mphosesebeni's uncle, Ntoyi, who had usurped the royal throne, begot Ntande and Zima. When Ntoyi passed on, Zima succeeded him as regent for the young Ntande. This is when amaTola arrived, led by Mkhuma and his brother. They are the ones who introduced the use of spears to abaThembu.

Ntande took over the reins after Zima's death, and he begot Ngxeko, Maya, and the twins Qithi and Cube. During the 16th century, Ngxeko led the migration from Dedesi to Msana in the Mthatha district.

Ngxeko was the first legitimate king of abaThembu because he assimilated various fragments from tribes such as amaBomvana, amaVundle, amaMpondomise, and amaMfengu to build his kingdom. Nxekwa begot Hlanga by a Mpondo woman of the Mqiha clan, Dlomo, the eldest from another wife, and twins Balisa and Ndungwana, from a third wife.

All these women had not been classified into different ranks from major to minor. But it was clear that Hlanga, whose mother was a princess, would most likely be the royal successor.

At that time, AmaMfene asked to be incorporated into the Thembu nation. They were duly received, and Ndungwana was instructed to allocate sites to them.

Ndungwana never returned from his mission; instead, he remained with the strangers, enjoying all the respect accorded him, and he installed himself as their Nkosi.

Whenever Dlomo slaughtered a cow, he sent the inxaxheba (the right hindquarter) to Ndungwana, his junior. Then Hlanga would also send his nxaxheba to his junior Balisa, a popular costume displaying royal authority.

One day, cows were slaughtered in the homes of Dlomo and Hlanga. Dlomo decided to share meat with Welangaye, a maiden from the Mpemvu clan. She burst out in praise of how Dlomo had basically installed himself as King and left, shedding tears of joy.

Before the British conquest in the 19th century, the Thembu had an independent kingdom. The Xhosa clan name of the Thembu kings is Ntlazi aNkosiyane. Recent kings, Buyelekhaya Zwelibanzi Dalindyebo, including Sabata Jonguhlanga Dalindyebo, took the surname Dalindyebo after a 19th-century king.

After the conquest, the Thembu came under the government of the Cape Colony as part of Transkei. Except for a few missionaries and traders, Transkei was a Bantustan. The Transkei remained a Bantustan under apartheid and was regarded, along with Ciskei, as the homeland of the Xhosa people.

== Great House ==
The great house of AbaThembu is called Eastern Thembu at Bumbane Great Palace and is situated in Mthata, Eastern Cape.

The right-hand house is called Western Thembu at Qamata Great Palace and is situated in Cofimvaba, Eastern Cape.

The Western Thembus' house enjoyed autonomy for decades and was often referred to as the right-hand house, while the Eastern Thembus' house was referred to as the great house.

King Buyelekhaya Dalindyebo, son of King Sabata Jonguhlanga Dalindyebo, became the King of the AbaThembu Nation in May 1989; his praise name is Aaǃ Zwelibanziǃ.

== The invasion of Thembuland ==
When King Moshoeshoe I of Basotho invaded Thembuland for more cattle, he went along with his younger brother Magabane and Morosi, his great friend and the king of BaPhuthi. Moshoeshoe then instructed Magabane to raid for cattle at Ngubengcuka’s royal estate, while he and Morosi relaxed on a mountain near Ngcobo. When Magabane returned with some cattle, Ngubengcuka's regiments gave him a tough time, but they failed to stop him.

The AbaThembu gradually built their regiments as more and more warriors responding to the war drum kept joining them. They attacked the Basotho repeatedly but were repulsed every time. Just as Magabane was about to ascend eLuhewini mountain with the cattle, a joint army of AmaHala and AmaQwathi arrived and Basotho with their small axes, reaping havoc on the enemy's limbs. Still, they were thrown into confusion as AbaThembu attacked from behind.

After some time, the Basotho gave in and sought refuge in a forest. Ngubengcuka instructed his army to completely expel Basotho from his Kingdom, but one of the men informed him that they had run out of weapons. Ngubengcuka then told them to get wood from the forest and make clubs. At once, the orders of the King were carried out, the Basotho were driven out of the forest with sticks and clubs, and Magabane was critically injured and later died as a result of his wounds.

When the fight reached Moshoeshoe, he put up no resistance and joined the flight into a nearby forest, which Ngubengcuka ordered his men to surround at once. Evening soon approached, and the AbaThembu could not drive the Basotho out of the forest because of the darkness. By the following morning, there was not a single Mosotho in the forest, as they had all escaped in that way. Moshoeshoe was defeated by King Ngubengcuka.

The forest was renamed Nduku, meaning (stick to commemorate how they were used to drive out Basotho who nearly perished in Thembuland). At the time when everything was under control in King Ngubengcuka’s country, no nation dared to touch him, and his power was accepted and recognized by all.

== King ==
Buyelekhaya Dalindyebo, son of Sabata Jonguhlanga Dalindyebo, became the Thembu king in May 1989; his praise name is Zwelibanzi. Sabata deposed Kaiser Matanzima, whom the government had installed and who advocated against South African liberation movements. In December 2009, King Buyelekhaya was convicted of offenses including culpable homicide, kidnapping, arson and assault. In response, he proposed secession from South Africa, and later demanded that the government pay Dalindyebo R900 million and the tribe a further R80 billion in compensation for the humiliation caused by his criminal trial.

Dalindyebo was imprisoned in December 2015. He was also dethroned and was expected to be administratively dethroned.

Prince Azenathi Dalindyebo, Buyelekhaya's heir, served as the acting king of the tribe while Dalindyebo was in prison.

On 23 December 2019, following President Cyril Ramaphosa's Day of Reconciliation speech, the abaThembu king was released from prison after serving one-third of his sentence.

Following his release from prison, an imbizo was called to remove Buyelekhaya Dalindyebo from the throne permanently. The king declared the imbizo to be invalid, and reportedly assaulted the regent and his wife with an ax.

Eastern Cape premier Oscar Mabuyane intervened, restoring Buyelekhaya Dalindyebo to the throne.

== Thembu Kingship line ==
Mthembu
Ndilo
Qoma (AmaQoma) Sigqu, Qomukuyitya, Mvand'inyama, Nyoyela	Mdlane (AmaMdlane) Tutuse, Nomdimba, Qandashe, Mbhomboyi	Jali (ooJali) Juta, Mbhomoyi, Nxeko, Ngciva	Mncotshe (AmaNcotshe) Ndala, Momamana, Msunu, Ngxunga, Thole
Ntongakazi
Bhomoyi
Ceduma
Zima
Mnguti
Ngxongo
Ntoyi
Ntande
Nxeko
Ndungwane (AmaNdungwane)	Dlomo	Hlanga (AmaQhayi)
Hala
Madiba
Tato
Zondwa (Zondwazintshaba) (he never became a King because he died before his father)
Ndaba (Ndabenyamazana)
1800 -10 August 1830 Vusani Ngubengcuka Aa! Vusani!
Mthikrakra	Mandela (chief)
Ngangelizwe (Qheya)	Matanzima	Henry Gadla Mphakanyiswa Mandela; Aa! Gadla!
Dalindyebo (Alava)	Mvuzo	Nelson Rolihlahla Mandela; Aa! Dalibhunga!
Sampu Dalindyebo Aa! Jongilizwe!	Sihlobo	Madiba "Thembi" Thembekile Mandela [1945–1969]	Makgatho Mandela [1950–2005]
Sabata Dalindyebo Aa! Jonguhlanga!	Kaiser Matanzima; Aa! Daliwonga!	George Matanzima Aa! Mzimvubu!	Mandla Mandela; Aa! Zwelivelile!
May 1989 - Buyelekhaya Dalindyebo Aa! Zwelibanzi!	Mthethuvumile Matanzima!	Siyambonga Dalimvula Matanzima; Aa! Dalimvula!
Lwandile Zwelenkosi Matanzima Aa! Zwelenkosi!

== See also ==
- Dalindyebo
- Matanzima
- Xhosa clan names
