= Bhaca people =

Ethnic groups of South Africa

Bhaca AmaBhaca
Total population
- 570,000 estimated 2024

Regions with significant populations
- Eastern Cape, Kwazulu Natal, South Africa)

Languages
- IsiBhaca (endangered); IsiXhosa, IsiZulu

Religion
- Christianity, African Traditional Religion

Related ethnic groups
- Xhosa, Swati, Zulu, Phuthi, Thembu other Nguni people

The AmaBhaca Nation
- Person: IBhaca
- People: AmaBhaca
- Language: IsiBhaca
- Country: KwaBhaca

The Bhaca people, or amaBhaca, are an Nguni ethnic group in South Africa.

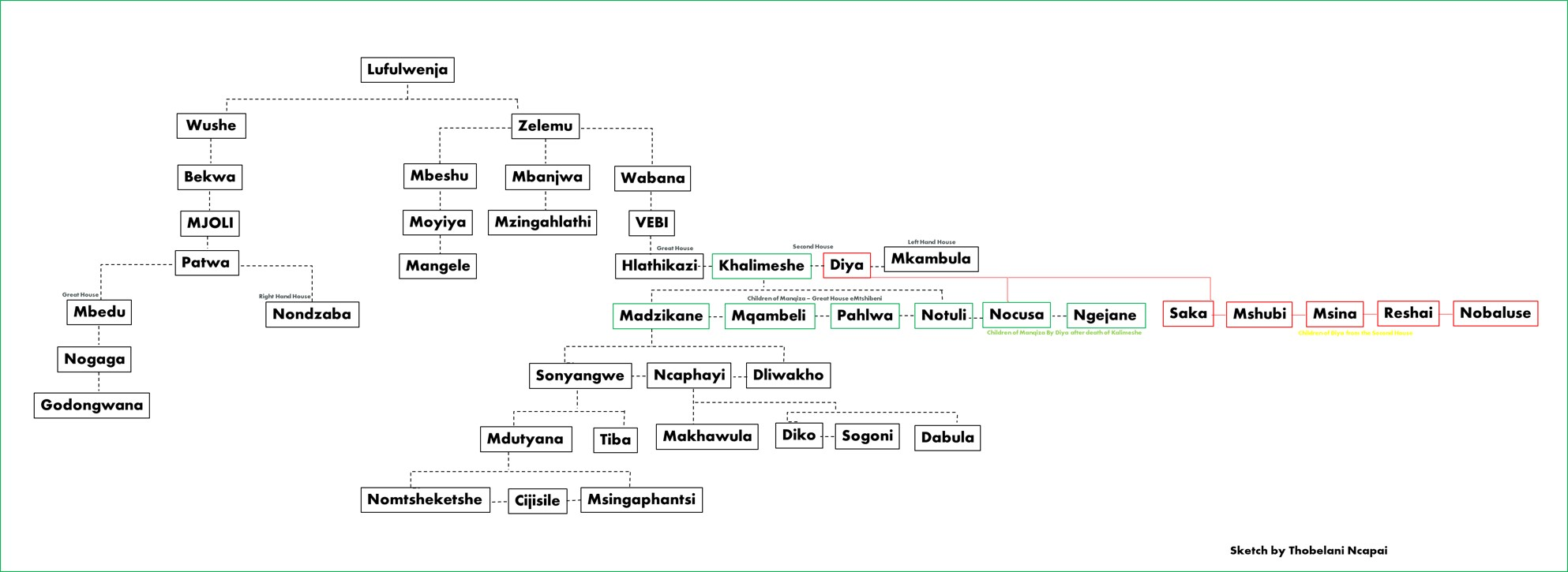
Genealogy of Wushe and Zelemu who merged to form AmaBhaca

== Background ==
AmaBhaca were formerly known as the Zelemus or AbakwaZelemu between the 1700s until 1830 when they were formally referred to as AmaBhaca. They are the descendants of chief Zelemu who lived in the Pongola and ruled his people who were part of the abaMbo people. Chief Zelemu shared the same ancestor with Chief Wushe by the name of Lufulelwenja. Zelemu and Wushe went separate ways in the early 1700s and their descendants were both called the AmaWushe and AbakwaZelemu. It was in the 1730 when their grandsons ( Khalimeshe and Mjoli) reunited again to form one tribe that later migrated south under the leadership of Madzikane ka Khalimeshe.

== Language ==
The AmaBhaca primarily speak isiBhaca, one of the Tekela languages in the Nguni branch. IsiBhaca reflects their cultural identity and is spoken in areas such as Mount Frere, Ixopo, Umzimkhulu, and Bulwer. IsiBhaca is an indigenous South African language which is unfortunately not taught in schools and through formal education. This has led to a decline in its use, many Bhaca people (amaBhaca) are adopting privileged languages like isiXhosa, isiZulu and English. IsiBhaca is considered to be on the brink of extinction unless necessary measures are taken to restore it. It faces significant challenges that threaten its survival. Despite this, efforts are made to preserve it through informal teaching and community initiatives. The linguistic shift highlights broader issues of language maintenance among marginalised groups in South Africa.

== Bhaca Kings ==
Here's a list of Bhaca kings from the earliest known time when the Bhaca (then known as the Zelemus) were settled around the Lebombo region until the time they moved south to isiBubulungu to the present day KwaBhaca, iXopo, Bulwer, Underberg, Mzimkhulu.

- Lufulwenja
- Zelemu
- Vebi
- Wabana
- Khalimeshe
- Madzikane
- Sonyangwe
- Ncapai

After the death of Ncaphayi the ruling line split into two sections, the great house section under Mdutyana moved back to Mzimkhulu. Ncaphayi's successor was his son from the great house King Diko who was birthed by Queen Mamjucu.

== Ncapayi ==
King Ncapayi had many wives. The first wife, Makhohlisa (daughter of Dzanibe clan), gave birth to King Diko and Sogoni. His second wife, Indlu yekunene, bore him Makaula, while his third wife Iqadi lendlu enkulu, produced Dabula, Tshalaza and Mpongoma.

Ncapayi is said to have been a fearless freebooter, and a diplomat of note who showed more intelligence than his father Madzikane. When Shaka's Army made an attempt to invade Bhaca land it was Ncapayi who acted as the army general and slew a great number of Shaka's impis in a running battle at Ntsizwa Mountain which forced the remaining small force to retreat, ensuring the independence of the Bhaca Kingdom.

According to Rev. Soga, during the year that Madzikane was killed, Ncapayi entered Thembuland to avenge the death. The Thembus under King Ngubengcuka made an ineffectual stand and the Bhacas swept away a large number of cattle. According to A. Bryant, this invasion of Thembuland also resulted in the Death of Ngubengcuka at the hands of Ncapayi.

Before Madzikane died and because of his relationship with King Faku, he advised his son to temporarily be a tributary King in Pondoland. Ncapayi took the advice and Faku welcomed the Bhacas, which coincided with the arrival of Nqetho, a Chief of the Qwabes who had moved from Natal to escape King Shaka's army because he would not serve under King Dingane. When he entered Pondoland and tried to secure land by violence, Faku was anxious to evict him with Ncapayi's assistance. AmaBhaca drove them back into Natal and Dingane issued an instruction to kill Nqetho.

After the Thembus' defeat by the Bhacas, Faku made an arrangement with Ncapayi when the Pondos wanted to attack the Thembus. They entered Thembuland on three occasions and each time succeeded.

Soga asserted that cupidity was the force that brought Faku and Ncapayi together and to have destroyed their relationship later. In 1845 Ncapayi attacked Nyanda, the Right Hand section of the Pondos under Ndamase, the son of Faku. He raided Nyanda successfully. King Faku assembled an army and moved against the Bhacas, attacking them on all sides. He drove the Bhacas before him on the ridge kuNowalala. Ncapayi was wounded and forced off the ridge, landing on a ledge. He was in a helpless condition with both arms broken and a severe assegai wound. He lay there for days, asking those who came to look at him to end his misery. After King Faku gave the order, he was killed. However, this was not the end of the Bhaca-Mpondo war as later down the line the Mpondo would suffer a huge defeat at the hands of Makaula ka Ncapayi after a failed invasion of Bhacaland.

== Conflict with the Afrikaners and the British ==
In about 1837 Boers arrived in Natal with herds of cattle. Between 1837 and 1840, the Boers fought the Bhacas who teamed up with the Bushmen to raid the herds.

In about February 1838 the Boers settled in the upland of Natal and began to create the Republic of Natalia. After their victories over Dingane, they extended northward to uMfolozi and St. Lucia Bay. The Boers created arrangements with other kings and therefore did not consider them as enemies. For example, they considered King Faku to be a friendly king and rated Ncapayi as having a powerful military and as a threat.

When the Boers came back, they attacked the Bhacas and raided with 700 men and 50 horses. This is said to have provided the spark for the British intervention in the Bhaca land (which had become part of Natal). An area near Maclear is called Ncapayi land (Kapayi land – because they could not pronounce "Nca").

== See also ==
- Xhosa clan names
- List of Bhaca kings

== Sources ==
- Bryant, Alfred T. (1929). Olden Times in Zululand and Natal: Containing Earlier Political History of the Eastern-Ngu̇ni Clans. Longmans, Green and Company. ISBN 978-0-598-89639-1.
- Soga, Tiyo (1878). A page of South African Mission Work.
