= Walter Stanford =

South African civil servant and politician

Walter Stanford KBE CB CMG
- Walter Stanford aged 33, in 1883

Under-Secretary for Native Affairs
- Incumbent
- Assumed office 1886
- Monarch: Victoria
- Governor: Henry Hugh Clifford

Magistrate
- In office 1876–1886
- Monarch: Victoria
- Governor: Henry Barkly; Henry Bartle Frere; Henry Hugh Clifford

Personal details
- Born: 2 August 1850 Alice, Cape Colony
- Died: 9 September 1933 (aged 83) Cape Town, South Africa
- Occupation: Politician, civil servant

Military service
- Rank: Colonel
- Unit: Cape Corps
- Battles/wars: Ninth Frontier War; Second Boer War; First World War

Sir Walter Ernest Mortimer Stanford KBE CB CMG (2 August 1850 – 9 September 1933) was a South African civil servant and politician.

Stanford was born in Alice, South Africa, in 1850 and was educated at the Lovedale Mission School. He left school and became a clerk under his uncle, the government agent to the Thembu. At age 18 he joined the civil service and was stationed at Queenstown, East London and in 1876 was appointed magistrate to the Qwathi chief, Dalasile, and settled at Engcobo, in Thembuland. He married Alice Sarah Walker in 1883 and they had three sons and four daughters. In 1885 he was promoted to chief magistrate of Griqualand East at Kokstad.

Stanford was involved in negotiations with the Mpondo and in 1886 reached an agreement which provided for peaceful future relations. He was appointed CMG in 1891 and became responsible for the administration of eastern Pondoland. In 1897 Stanford became under-secretary for native affairs in Cape Town, and subsequently the first chief magistrate of the newly formed Transkeian Territories. In 1904 he was appointed to the headship of the Native Affairs department, as well as chief magistrate. Special duties included roles as an adviser at the inter-state customs conference 1903, membership of the native affairs commission, 1903–1905, and acting as adviser to William Palmer, 2nd Earl of Selborne, the British High Commissioner to South Africa) on Swazi affairs in 1906. Stanford entered the Cape Legislative Assembly in 1908 as an independent member for Thembuland and was selected to represent the views of the African people at the National Convention of 1909, which led to the Union of South Africa. He argued strongly for universal franchise, regardless of race and gender but his proposal was not accepted. From 1910 to 1929, he served in the Senate, nominated for his knowledge of the African peoples. He was a colonel with the South African forces in the First World War. In 1919 he was appointed KBE, and died age 83 in 1933.

== Early years ==
Stanford was descended from the British 1820 Settlers in the Cape Colony on both his father's (William Stanford) and his mother's (Joanna Warner) sides. Walter Ernest Mortimer was their second son, born at Alice on 2 August 1850. His father died in 1856 at the early age of 36 following amputation of a leg after a riding accident. His mother 'was a small woman of indomitable courage who continued trading, farming and transport-riding, while still finding time to encourage her sons to read and write".

Walter was in "poor health" so was sent at the age of 7 to live with his uncle Joseph Cox Warner in the Queenstown district where the altitude might improve his strength, a strategy which seems to have been effective, judging by his long and strenuous career. He received some schooling from a maiden aunt, Mary Warner, and for two years attended the Lovedale Missionary Institution, finishing his formal education just before he turned twelve.

On 1 July 1863, just before his 13th birthday, Walter became a clerk under his uncle, the government agent to the Thembu at Glen Grey. He thus entered the service of the department of African affairs in which he was to remain for 45 years and through which "he was destined to exercise a profound influence on the development of South Africa". Responsibility came early: in his uncle's absence he became in effect the agent, Her Majesty's representative to a semi-independent African tribe. He continued in Thembuland for six years, before moving to Queenstown and then East London as a servant of the department.

== Magistracy ==
Walter advanced steadily and in 1876 was appointed magistrate to Thembuland. He was commissioned and fought in the Ninth Frontier War (1877–8) with "gallantry, energy and judgement". This was followed by further skirmishes and tribal unrest, before Walter returned to magisterial duties in 1881. His first task was to relocate the defeated tribes. The Report of the Thembuland Commission testifies to "the fairness of the magistrates and the tenacity with which they attempted to ensure their native charges were justly treated". He was also appointed to the Native Laws and Customs Commission, which was responsible for drafting a criminal code which recognised both African custom and European principles of justice.

In 1883 Walter married Alice Walker of Port Elizabeth, a long and happy marriage, with seven children: Walter, Dorothy, Robert, Alice, Arthur, Helen and Eileen.

Two years later he was appointed chief magistrate and administrative head of East Griqualand, headquartered in Kokstad. This was a tricky appointment as there were constant border skirmishes, raids and friction with the neighbouring Mpondo tribe until Stanford negotiated a treaty, signed in 1886, despite unhelpful instructions from the Government and Prime Minister in Cape Town, which Stanford was able largely to ignore because of the distance by horse! In due course he was appointed C.M.G (Companion of the Order of St Michael and St George) for this achievement.

In 1894 the paramount chief of the Pondo died, leaving a leadership vacuum which led to a decision by Cecil Rhodes to annexe Pondoland. That this contentious act was achieved without bloodshed was largely due to the diplomacy of Stanford and other magistrates. Rhodes was not pleased by the magistrates' commitment to just and fair treatment of the natives, leading to some acrimony (for which Rhodes apologised to Stanford much later).

== Cape Town ==
In 1896 the prime minister, Sir Gordon Sprigg, appointed Stanford under-secretary for native affairs, in Cape Town. Stanford accompanied the next prime minister, W.P. Schreiner on a tour of the Eastern Province in 1899, explaining the African culture so coherently that Schreiner described the tour as "his road to Damascus" so profound a change did it make to his views on African policy.

During the Second Boer War Stanford was the liaison between the Cape authorities and the Transkeian Territories and soon was placed in charge of a field force there. Following the war the Territories were consolidated under one magistrate, to which post Stanford was appointed in 1902. Remarkably the two assistant magistrates were his brothers: Robert at Kokstad and Arthur at Umtata. Walter was always sympathetic to the Transkeians. Known by them as 'Ndabeni' ('in the news'), he was deeply respected. His popularity was such that when Cape Town's first African township was set up in 1901, on Crown land near Maitland, following recommendations by a commission chaired by Stanford, it was named Ndabeni in his honour at the residents' request.

From 1903 to 1905 Walter Stanford was a member of the Native Affairs Commission 1903 which recommended, inter alia "that a central Native College be established for training native teachers and to afford opportunity for higher education to native students", although these high principles came to nothing. Walter also advocated the commission's recommendations that Africans should have representation in Parliament. In 1904 he was recalled to Cape Town to head the Native Affairs Department but by 1907 his heart was under strain and he retired on medical advice. However, by 1908 he was so recovered that he stood for Parliament and was returned for Thembuland, as an Independent

== National Convention ==
An election in 1908 brought in John X. Merriman as Prime Minister of the Cape Colony, opening the way to convening representatives of the four hitherto rival South African colonies (Cape, Natal, Transvaal and Orange Free State). The National Convention was set up to advise on the nature and constitution of the Union, and Stanford was appointed as one of the 30 members, reflecting the liberal view as well as the interests of the Transkei and other African communities. He put the interest of the great majority of the population before the need for unifying the two colonies and two former republics, all of them legislated for and governed solely by white men.

Colonel Stanford argued strongly for enfranchisement of the Native Peoples and asserted "there must be a just native policy". He formally proposed "that all subjects of His Majesty resident in South Africa shall be entitled to franchise rights irrespective of race or colour…” He argued that the franchise was the crux of the whole native question in South Africa.

Despite his reputation and his understanding of African life he was unable to persuade the convention to adopt a universal franchise. The Convention did however agree to preserve the existing non-racial Cape Colony franchise and to entrench it in the South Africa Act, passed by Parliament in London in May 1910, which created the Union of South Africa.

== Later years ==
Following the Union Stanford was nominated to the Senate on the basis of his experience with the African people, and continued to champion their cause until the outbreak of the First World War when he took up recruiting work for the army, serving with the Cape Corps, of which he later became Hon Colonel.

In November 1914 he was sent to East Griqualand where there were fears of an armed uprising. He identified genuine grievances (related to sheep dipping regulations) made recommendations and negotiated a peaceful settlement. He returned to Cape Town and in 1918 became director of recruiting. At the end of the war he was appointed commissioner for returned soldiers. His lifelong services were recognised in 1919 with his appointment as Knight Commander of the Order of the British Empire (KBE)

After the war Stanford remained busy. He helped found the 1820 Memorial Settlers Association and served as a steward of the South African Turf Club for 20 years. He gave his time and energy to the Western Province Agricultural Society, the Church, and the Community Chest of Cape Town. In 1927 he was awarded the honorary degree of Doctor of Laws by the University of Cape Town, an honour he greatly valued. Senate work continued until he retired in 1929.

In 1933 Walter and Alice celebrated their golden wedding, surrounded by their children and grandchildren. Soon afterwards Walter was taken ill and died on 9 September 1933.

Following his death Jan Smuts (Prime Minister 1919–1924, 1939–48)) wrote to Alice: "I counted Sir Walter Stanford among those of my friends on whom I could rely for wise counsel and support and it is a deep sorrow that he has passed away. He has had an exceptional record of service to his country, and leaves behind a record of which we are all very proud".
