= Madzikane =

King of the AmaBhaca Nation

Madzikane kaZulu
- IKumkani of AmaBhaca
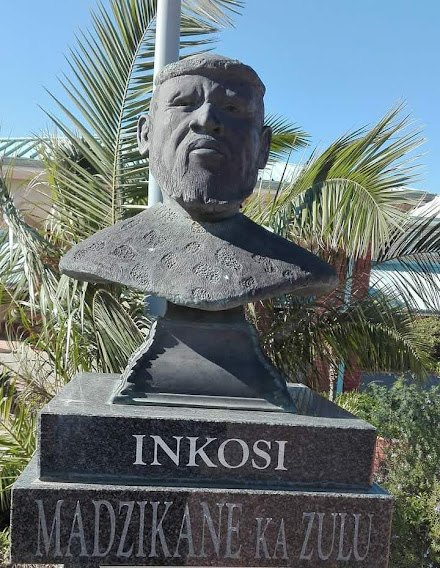
- Bust erected outside the Madzikane kaZulu Memorial Hospital in Mount Frere (KwaBhaca)
- Reign: 1801 to 1836
- Coronation: March 1801
- Predecessor: Inkosi Khalimeshe kaWabana
- Successor: King Ncapai kaMadzikane
- Born: Gobiswana ka Khalimeshe; Lebombo
- Died: 20 December 1836; Ngcobo, Eastern Cape
- Burial: Gqutyini Forest, eNgcobo
- Issue: Sonyangwe, Ncapai, Chitha, Bhekezulu, Dliwakho, Mafingila, Sontsi, Matiwane, Ngamlana, and many others
- House: House of Zulu
- Father: Khalimeshe

King Madzikane was the founder and a King of the amaBhaca nation. He was the son of the Zelemu King Khalimeshe kaWabana.

== Family ==
King Madzikane's father was King Khalimesh. His firstborn was Crown Prince Sonyangwe followed by Prince Ncapai. However, because of the Mfecane wars, Prince Sonyangwe the crown prince was burnt to death at night in his hut by traitors from the Memela who were vassals of the AmaBhele Clan of u-Mdingi who were subjects of King Madzikane while he still reigned. Prince Sonyangwe died at Rode before he could become King of amaBhaca people.

Therefore, on the death of King Madzikane, Prince Ncaphayi was crowned King of all AmaBhaca people but because his elder brother Sonyangwe had left behind two sons in Natal, (i.e. Princes Mdutyane and Thiba), King Ncaphayi was obliged to share the throne with Sonyangwes' heir. When Prince Mdutyane was only twenty-one, King Ncaphayi died in a war against the AmaMpondo King Faku. Crown Prince Mdutyane was crowned King of all the AmaBhaca Clans and hence became the supreme ruler of the whole AmaBhaca nation consisting of more than forty-four different Clans scattered all over southern Natal.

=== Wives ===
King Ncapayi had many wives. Indlu Enkulu birth to Prince Diko and Prince Sogoni. From his second wife, bore Prince Makaula. His third wife Iqadi Lendlu Enkulu bore Prince Dabula. King Madzikane's kingdom is currently being revived by the Reat House of King Ncapayi, Inkosi King Madzikane II Thandisizwe Diko. The home of the AmaBhacas and their Kingdom is in Mount Frere, KwaBhaca in the Eastern Cape.

King Ncapayi is said to have been a fearless freebooter, a diplomat of note who showed even more intelligence than his father and was respected by many nations (Soga, p. 444)

=== Death ===
After many vicissitudes, including managing to defeat Shaka Zulu's army at Nunge/Ntsizwa Mountains, the AmaBhaca Nation moved down into Thembuland where they attacked the amaTshatshu and AmaGcina AbaThembu Kingdom, causing the amaTshatshu to flee to Prince Maqoma for safety. The Paramouncy (AmaXhosa Kingdom), AbaThembu and AmaMpondomise combined forces and crushed the AmaBhaca, killing they leader who was King Madzikane(1828-1836)

The AmaBhaca Kingdom and the AmaMpondo Kingdom entered into an uneasy alliance and launched a joint attack on the AmaBomvana Kingdom, but this was repulsed by the Paramount, King Hintsa. According to Reverend Soga, during the same year in which King Ncapayi’s father King Madzikane was killed, King Ncaphayi entered Thembuland to avenge his father’s death. The AbaThembus under King Ngubengcuka made an ineffectual stand and the AbaBhaca nation swept away a large number of cattle and claimed the life of King Ngubengcuka.

Before King Madzikane died, and because of the relationship he had with King Faku, he advised his son to temporarily be a tributary king in Mpondoland. He indeed did that and Faku at this time welcomed the AmaBhaca people as this also coincided with the arrival of Nqetho, a chief of the AmaQwabe clan who had moved from Natal running away from King Tshaka's army because he could not serve under King Dingane. When he entered Mpondoland and tried to secure land by violence, King Faku was anxious to get rid of him and therefore secured assistance from Ncaphayi to eject Nqetho. AmaBhaca drove them back into Natal and King Dingane issued instructions to kill Nqetho.

Soon after Prince Sonyangwe's death King Madzikane died, but before he died he split the Kingdom of the AmaBhaca Kingdom between his deceased crown prince and his son Prince Ncaphayi.

The AbaThembu Kingdom's defeat by the AmaBhaca Kingdom, also led to King Faku of AmaMpondo Kingdom making an arrangement with King Ncapayi when the AmaMpondos wanted to attack the AbaThembus. They entered into Thembuland on three successive occasions and each time their raid was a success.

Soga asserts that cupidity is said to have been the force that brought King Faku and King Ncapayi to work together. It is also cupidity that is said to have destroyed their good working relationship. Because they were both strong, it became difficult to know which one was more powerful than the other. King Ncapayi attacked Nyanda, the right hand section of the AmaMpondos under Prince Ndamase, the son of King Faku. He raided Nyanda successfully. Meanwhile, the alarm had been raised with King Faku and he assembled a powerful army and this came up with the AmaBhacas and attacked them on all sides. Faku drove the AmaBhaca people before him onto the kuNowalala Ridge. King Ncaphayi was wounded and forced over the edge, falling onto a ledge some distance from the bottom. He was in helpless condition with both arms broken, besides a severe assegai (spear) wound. He lay there for days, persuading those who came to look at him to put an end to his misery and kill him. And sibobi No one could do this until King Faku gave orders that he must be killed. King Madzikane’s son, King Ncapayi died in the 1846

== Ncapai ==
King Ncapai Ka Madzikane
- King of AmaBhaca Kingdom
- Predecessor: King Sonyangwe ka Madzikane
- Successor: King Diko ka Ncapai
- Born: c. 1804; Bluff (Esibubulungu) now Durban Zulu Kingdom
- Died: 1846 (aged -1–0); Nowalala, Pondoland
- Spouse: Queen Makhohlisa (senior wife) and several other wives

King Ncapai (also spelt as Ncapayi or Ncaphayi) was the king of the AmaBhaca people between 1836 until his death in 1846. He was the second son from the first wife of King Madzikane ka Zulu. The first born being Prince Sonyangwe his elder brother. He resided at his father's royal residence in Mpoza great place facing Mganu mountains and also build another residence in the nearby Lutateni. While trying to attack mpondo people due to Maitland treaty he fell off the cliff died in a place called Nowalala near Ntabankulu in March 1844. King Faku kaNgqungqushe ordered he must be killed to save him from pain and agony he had suffered as for days he had plunged beneath the cliff. Ncapayi is said to have been a ruthless freebooter.

=== 1837 ===
In about 1837, Boers arrived in Natal with herds of cattle and the AmaBhaca Nation saw an opportunity to attack and raid. Between 1837 and 1840, the Bhacas teamed up with the Bushmen and raided the Boers.

=== 1838 ===
In about February 1838, the Boers settled in the upland of Natal and had successfully set the foundation upon which they could build the Republic of Natalia. After their victories over Dingane, they extended northward to uMfolozi and St. Lucia Bay (Blue Book on Native Affairs, 1885). The Boers had managed to make arrangements with other kings and therefore no longer considered them as potential enemies. For example, they considered King Faku a friendly king and rated Ncapayi a threat as he had a powerful military.

When the Boers returned, they decided to attack the AmaBhacas (Bryant, p. 400) and raided with 700 men and 50 horses (Nchanga, 119). This is said to have provided the spark for the British intervention in the Bhacaland. (At this time this land had become part of Natal). There is an area near the town of Maclear which is still called Ncapayiland (Kapayiland – because they could not pronounce “Nca”).

=== 1845 ===
By 1845 the AmaBhacas had already been stripped of their Kingdom by the Maitland Treaty. King Ncapayi, the first enemy in the Maitland Treaty died and was survived by his first son Diko. But he would be reduced to a headman later on.

He led the AmaBhaca nation for thirty-five years from 1845 to 1880 after the death of his father iKumkani King Ncapayi ka Madzikane. INkosi King Diko was the grandson of King Madzikane Ka Zulu.

=== 1880 ===
iNkosi King Diko was a fierce leader who fought against the annexation of the land by the British colonial government. He resisted handing over the AmaBhaca nation so its people could become British subjects. As a result of his resistance to the oppressive rule of the colonisers he was not a favourite of the colonial government of his time. The government decided to overthrow him in 1880. The oppression of King Diko’s house had been felt by all eight generations, for a period of 130 years.

According to the writings of Anderson Mhlawuli Makaula (1988), by virtue of birth, and according to tradition, King Diko was the heir to iKumkani King Ncaphayi. But because some of the councillors of AmaBhaca liked Mamjucu, the mother of Makaula, she was fraudulently made a great wife, hence her son attained chieftainship. Makhohlisa (the mother of Prince Diko and prince Sogoni) who was King Ncaphayi’s wife of the great house (u-Ndlunkulu), was not loved by these councillors, hence they plotted against her.

It happened that King Ncaphayi had killed a man in one of the Mfecane battles and according to AmaBhaca tradition, iNkosi was not supposed to have any contact with his wives until he had undergone some medical treatment. A separate accommodation was to be provided for him. King Ncaphayi was then placed in isolation for a stipulated period. The councillors under Qulu Siwela further conspired so that the wife who goes to cook for iNkosi King Ncaphayi while he is in isolation, and conceives during that period, would be the one who would give birth to the chief that would succeed him after his death.

After iNkosi King Ncaphayi’s death, King Diko (his first and eldest son) led the AmaBhaca Nation from 1845. iNkosi King Diko was always in conflict with the British government and he blatantly refused the annexation of the AmaBhaca nation's land. When the British supremacy pervaded the Transkei Territory during the 1860s, the government pioneered the annexation of the Transkeian Territories. The amakhosi were to give up their power and become subjects of the British Colonial Government. Magistrates were to take over power from the amaKhosi, especially those who refused to submit their nations to be under British rule. iNkosi King Diko was one of those traditional leaders who resisted and he was then overthrown, deposed, and made headman by the Colonial Government in 1880.

Battles were fought throughout this period. For example, a friend to iNkosi King Diko was iNkosi King Mhlontlo of amaMpondomise who is said to have killed a magistrate at Qumbu while resisting annexation. Other amaKhosi who accepted annexation were rewarded for their loyalty to the colonial government and were looked after and treated well.

The plan to destroy any trace of iNkosi King Diko and his descendants has prevailed over generations after this great hero had died. Even today, King Diko’s files, from iNkosi King Diko himself, King Qoza ka-Diko, Prince Mthakathi ka-Qoza, King Mabhijela ka-Mthakathi, King Dingumhlaba ka-Mabhijela and King Mzawugugi ka-Dingumhlaba (all the descendants of King Diko) have been removed from the archives in Mthatha. The big question is: What happened to these files and where are they?

AmaBhaca are mainly found in the small towns such as Mount Frere, uMzimkhulu, Xopo and some surrounding areas. The isiBhaca language is a mixture of isiXhosa, isiZulu and isiSwati. The language of isiSwati was influenced by the fact that King Madzikane’s mother was from one of the Royal Houses of the Swatis of aMalambo. He grew up within the AmaSwatis from his mother’s side and therefore spoke the language. Although he accepts that he is not an authority on this, Jordan, A.C. (1953) argues and also asserts that in the traditional history of the Bhacas, “u-Dlamini and kwaDlamini” figure a great deal (P.5). He further states that the AmaBhaca language was stifled to death chiefly by isiXhosa through, amongst others, schools and churches and that a large number of enlightened Bhacas were taught to look down upon their mother tongue.

Diko is the first son of King Ncapayi, (Queen Makhohlisa a daughter of AmaDzanibe clan was the first wife of King Ncapayi) with his younger brother Prince Sogoni from the first wife of King Ncaphayi. The younger brother from the second wife was Inkosi King Makaula followed by Inkosi King Dabula and others from other younger wives. Inkosi King Madzikane ll Diko is the crown prince of iNkosi King Dilizintaba, ka King Dingumhlaba, ka King Mabhijelai, ka ka King Mthakathi, ka King Qoza ka King Diko ka King Ncaphayi, ka King Madzikane, ka King Khalimeshe, ka King Vebi, ka King Wabane, ka King Didi, ka King Dlungwana, Mzulu 2nd, ka King Ntombela, ka King Mzulu 1st, ka King Malandela, ka King Luzumana, King Mnguni 2nd .

INkosi King Madzikane II Thandisizwe Diko is currently the head of kwaBhaca/EmaBhacweni Traditional Council at ELundzini Royal Kraal, Ncunteni Great Place, EmaBhacweni A/A in Mount Frere, KwaBhaca.

AmaBhaca Nation were therefore stripped off their dignity and their Kingdomship by the colonial powers, the Boers, the Griquas and later on, the apartheid did not make it any better. The home of the AmaBhacas is in Mount Frere, while other AmaBhacas who went back to KwaZulu are in Mzimkhulu and Ixopo under the AmaZulu Kingdom.

Preceded by Khalimeshe kaWabana	King of the Bhaca Nation; 1801–1824	Succeeded by Sonyangwe kaMadzikane

== See also ==
- List of Bhaca kings
