= Dalindyebo =

Dalindyebo is a South African surname that may refer to

- Sabata Dalindyebo (1928–1986), South African royalty, descendant of Ngubengcuka
- Buyelekhaya Dalindyebo (born 1964), South African royalty, descendant of Ngubengcuka
