= Ncapai =

17th-century Bhaca king (1804-1845)

Ncapai ka Madzikane
- King of AmaBhaca Kingdom
- Predecessor: Sonyangwe ka Madzikane
- Successor: Diko ka Ncapai
- Born: c. 1804; Bluff (Esibubulungu) now Durban, Zulu Kingdom
- Died: July 1845 (aged 40–41); Nowalala, Pondoland
- Spouse: Makhohlisa (senior wife) and several other wives
- Issue: Diko, Makaula, Sogoni, Dabula, Mpongoma, Tshalaza, Skelem, Ndimitsi
- Father: Madzikane

Ncapai (also spelt as Ncapayi or Ncaphayi; c. 1804 Bluff—July 1845, Pondoland) was the king of the Bhaca people between 1826 until his death in July 1845. He was the second son from the first wife of King Madzikane ka Zulu; the first born being Sonyangwe, his elder brother. He resided at his father's royal residence in Mpoza, the great place facing Mganu mountains and also built another residence in the nearby Lutateni. While trying to attack the Mpondo people, due to the Maitland treaty, he fell off a cliff and died in a place called Nowalala, near Ntabankulu in July 1845. Faku kaNgqungqushe ordered that he must be killed to save him from the pain and agony he had suffered for days after he had plunged beneath the cliff. Ncapayi is said to have been a ruthless freebooter.

Preceded by Sonyangwe kaMadzikane	King of the Bhaca Nation; 1826–1846	Succeeded by Mdutyana kaSonyangwe

== See also ==
- List of Bhaca kings
