= Matanzima =

Matanzima is a South African surname that may refer to

- George Matanzima (1918–2000), leader of Transkei, an area in South Africa and descendant of Ngubengcuka
- Kaiser Matanzima (1915–2003), leader of Transkei, an area in South Africa, brother of George and descendant of Ngubengcuka
- Lwandile Zwelenkosi Matanzima (1970/71–2010), South African clan leader and descendant of Ngubengcuka
- Qaqambile Matanzima (1949–2013), South Africa politician and tribal leader and descendant of Ngubengcuka
- Simphiwe Matanzima (born 1997), South African rugby union player
- Themba Matanzima (born 1953), South African Army officer
