= King Ncapayi =

Ncapai ka Madzikane
- King of AmaBhaca Kingdom
- Predecessor: Sonyangwe ka Madzikane
- Successor: Diko ka Ncapai
- Born: c. 1804; Bluff (Esibubulungu) now Durban Zulu Kingdom
- Died: 1846 (aged 41–42); Nowalala, Pondoland
- Spouse: Makhohlisa (senior wife) and several other wives

Ncapayi (also spelt as Ncapai or Ncaphayi) was the king of the Bhaca people between 1834 until his death in 1846. He was the second son from the first wife of King Madzikane, the firstborn being Sonyangwe his elder brother. He resided at his father's royal residence in Mpoza facing the Mganu mountains and also built another residence in the nearby Lutateni. While trying to attack the Mpondo people due to the Maitland treaty he fell off the cliff and died in a place called Nowalala near Ntabankulu in March 1844. Faku ordered he must be killed to save him from pain and agony he had suffered as for days he had plunged beneath the cliff.

== See also ==
- List of Bhaca kings

Preceded by Sonyangwe kaMadzikane	King of the Bhaca Nation; 1826–1846	Succeeded by Diko kaNcapayi
