= Bomvana =

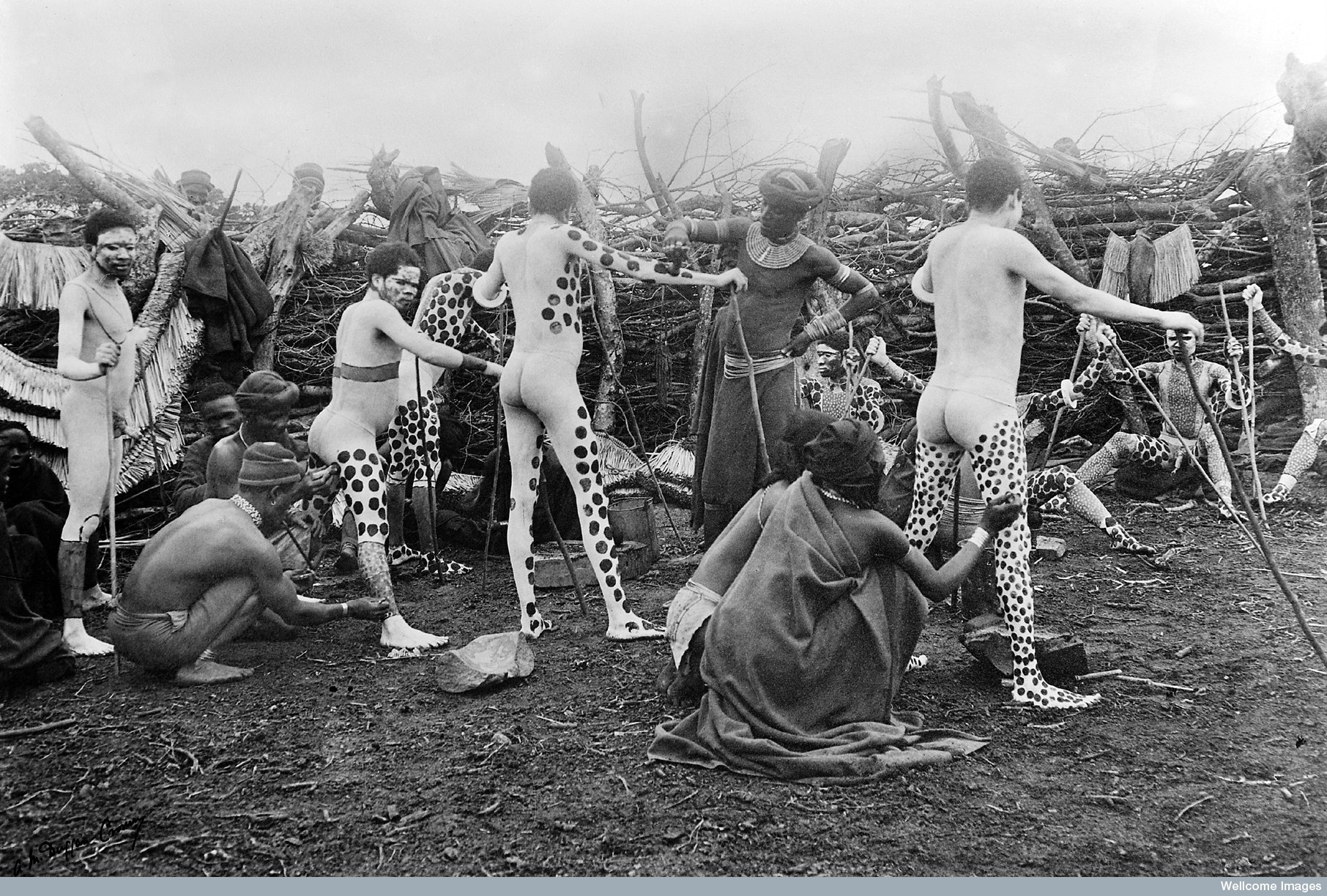
Bomvana Abakweta being painted

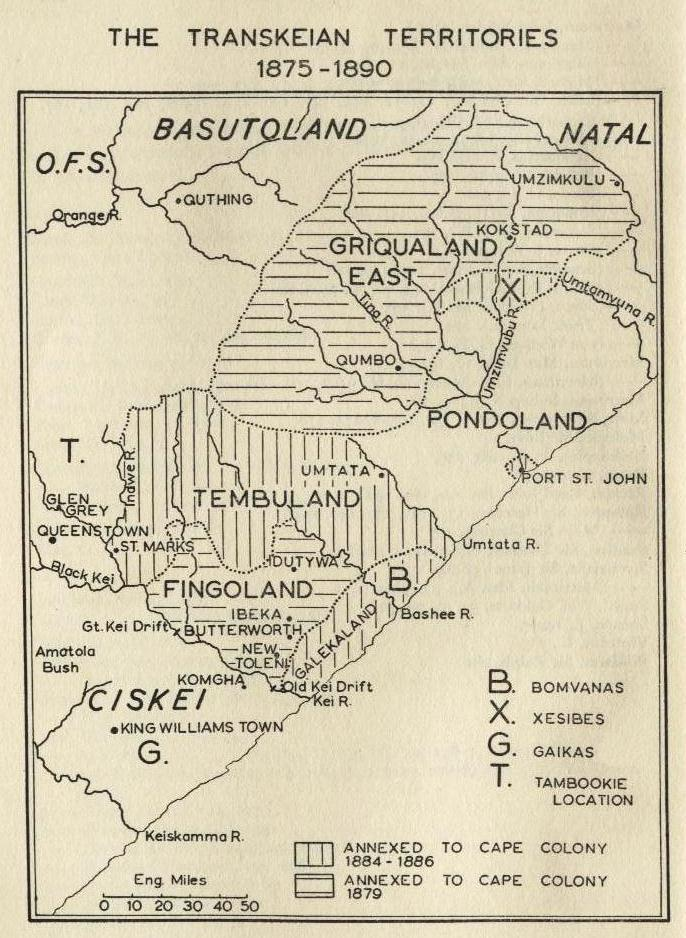
Bomvanas between Tembuland and Galekaland on a map of the Transkei Cape frontier 1875-1890

According to their own tradition, the Bomvana originate from the AmaNgwane people of KwaZulu-Natal. The AmaBomvana are descended from Nomafu, the first of the AmaNgwana tribe and from Bomvu, who gave rise to the AmaBomvu tribe. Bomvu's Great Son, Nyonemnyam, carried on the Bomvu dynasty. His son Njilo is the progenitor of the AmaBomvana. The AmaBomvana people left Natal in 1650 to settle in Pondoland after a dispute over cattle. After the death of Njilo’s wife, their grandson Dibandlela refused to send, in accordance with custom, the isizi cattle to his grandfather. This led to an open dispute. Dibandlela fled with his supporters and their cattle to settle in Pondoland

The AmaBomvana remained in Pondoland until 1837. After experiencing two centuries of tribal wars, the amaBomvana were driven out of Pondoland into the area east of the Mbashe river, including the present-day Cwebe reserve and they put themselves under the wing of the Gcaleka, with permission from King Hintsa, who was the Paramount of all states in the Eastern Cape.

They are historically related and share a common lineage with the AmaMpondomise, AmaXesibe, AbakwaMkhize, AmaBomvu and AmaMpondo as they all have related cultural similarities. The passing of four centuries since their division and the influence of neighboring tribal groups have brought about the linguistic and cultural differences, and differences in their rituals and rites of passage that we observe today.

== Agriculture and husbandry ==
The Bomvana people are pastoralists and agriculturists, breeding a type of cattle they consider sacred called Bolowana Cattle or Izankayi. Bolowana cattle are used for ploughing and other draft purposes. The possession of land and cattle, for example, is necessary for full participation in the social and religious life of the tribe.

After their migration from Kwa-Zulu Natal Bomvana people remained affluent across the Mbashe river, because their chief, Ntshunqe, had refused to participate in the prophecy of Nongqawuse, the Xhosa prophetess whose prophecies led to a millennialist movement that culminated in the Xhosa cattle-killing movement and famine (1854–1858). While most of the other Xhosa tribes suffered famine because of this prophecy they had obeyed, the Bomvana people grew their cattle and farmed their lands.

After the turn of the century subsistence for the AmaBomvane people and other groups living around the Mbashe river became more problematic. Two waves of cattle disease, in 1897 and 1910, decimated the herds of the Bomvana and plunged them into poverty and dependency.

The Bomvana tribe have been said to have traded tobacco and cannabis with the Amapondo and other Xhosa speaking tribes for metal

== Early education ==
Education had effectively split the Amabomvana into two groups: the “red” illiterate people and the “school”. The red people, or amaqaba, continue to paint themselves with red ochre and are classified as educated in traditional ways and the “school” people, or "amagqobhoka”, are people who have left traditional life and are usually Christians and educated in Western ways.

In 1878, the countryside which the AmaBomvana occupied was involved in a war and Moni, the chief of the Bomvanas, was unable to maintain neutrality so applied to be received as a British subject. The high commissioner accepted his offer, and took possession of the district surrounding the Mbase River, called Elliotdale, and brought the area under the British flag, ensuring the protection of the AmaBomvana. In the aftermath of the annexation of the Transkei in the 1890s, measures to disempower the traditional leaders and extend the authority of the colonialists brought dislocation to the societies, which mostly depended on traditional leadership like the Bomvana and the Gcalecka.

Similarly, the impact of migrant labour during the apartheid years has withdrawn from their tribal society and mobilised men between the ages of 18 and 50 for the labour market.

== See also ==
- Xhosa clan names
- Nguni people
- The Heart of Redness (2000), novelist Zakes Mda
