= Xesibeland =

Coordinates: 30°48′S 29°22′E

Location of Xesibeland

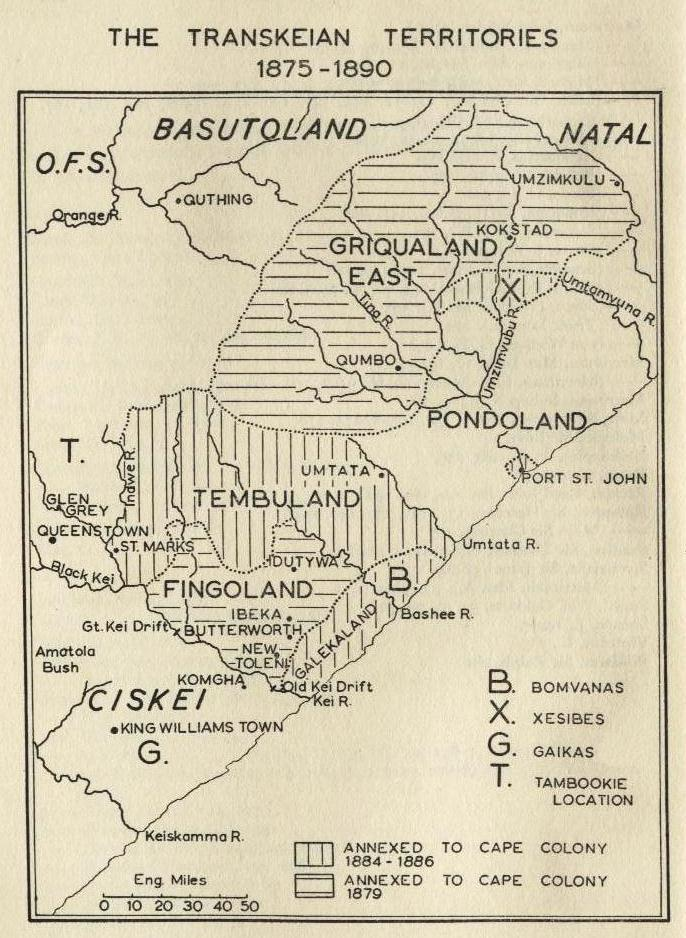
Xesibeland marked with an "X" in a map of the Transkei Cape frontier 1875-1890

Xesibeland was a region in South Africa lying between Griqualand East and Pondoland the area around Mount Ayliff. Xesibeland was the traditional region of the Xesibe people (AmaXesibe), closely related to the Mpondo people and the Mpondomise.

== History ==
Xesibeland had been formerly part of Mpondoland. On 20 October 1886 after xesibe was annexed by the colonials, armed Mpondo people invaded Xesibeland, burning kraals and causing much disorder. They resented the loss of Xesibeland, an area that was not so crowded as other parts of Mpondoland and thus could have supported a greater population. About 10,000 more Mpondos concentrated on the border after the invasion, but after occasional battles and retreats by the Mpondo, order was eventually restored in December that same year. At that time the leader of the Mpondos was Umquieka. Xesibeland was annexed by the British to Cape Colony in 1886.
