= Ndabeni =

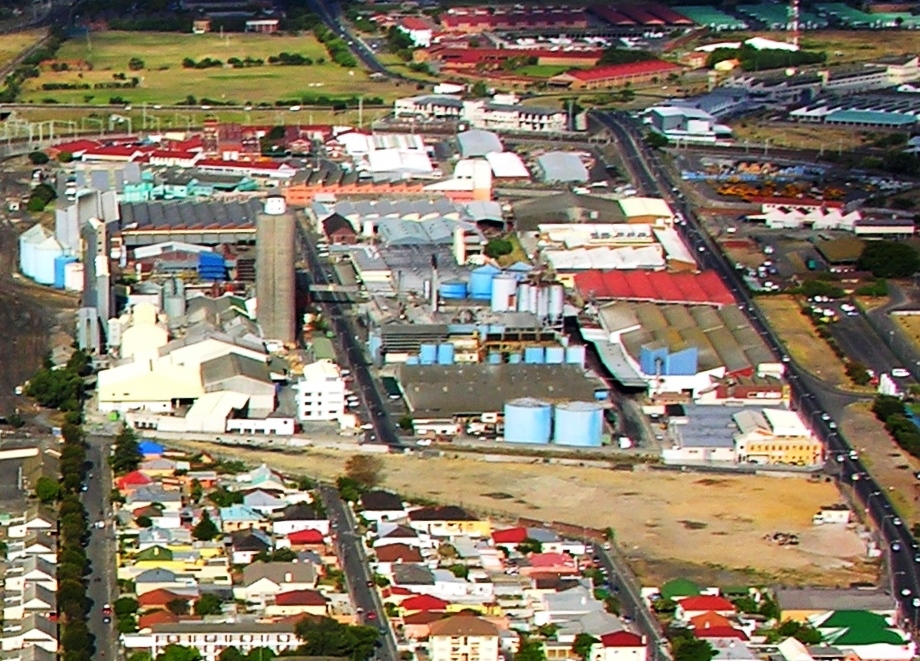
- An industrial area in Ndabeni, 2007

- Location within Western Cape Location within South Africa
- Coordinates: 33°55′46″S 18°29′32″E
- Country: South Africa
- Province: Western Cape
- Municipality: City of Cape Town
- Main Place: Cape Town

Area
  - Total: 2.16 km^{2} (0.83 sq mi)

Population (2011)
  - Total: 1,014
  - Density: 469/km^{2} (1,220/sq mi)

Racial makeup (2011)
  - Black African: 49.4%
  - Coloured: 36.1%
  - Indian/Asian: 3.8%
  - White: 8.1%
  - Other: 2.6%

First languages (2011)
  - English: 53.0%
  - Afrikaans: 14.5%
  - Xhosa: 5.4%
  - Southern Ndebele: 1.6%
  - Other: 25.4%
- Time zone: UTC+2 (SAST)
- Postal code (street): 7405

Ndabeni is an industrial suburb of Cape Town, South Africa, mainly occupied by light industries such as textiles and clothing. It is located about 6 km (4 miles) east of Cape Town city centre and is serviced by a railway station. Ndabeni is bordered to the south east by Pinelands and to the north by Maitland. Its postcode is 7405.

== History ==
Throughout the 19th century the black population of Cape Town increased dramatically. An 1865 census carried out by the colonial government put the figure at 274 (Western, p. 45). By 1881, some of the whites had begun to think the black population in Papendorp and District Six was so sizeable that they "[needed] to establish an official 'Kafir location' for it..." (Saunders, p. 29). In 1890 the Dock Native Location was established to house black labourers at the dock. This removed the need for employers to house them, often in their own homes. By the end of the century the population had, according to Saunders, risen to 10,000 in greater Cape Town. The town was named "Ndabeni" after Sir Walter Stanford at the residents request. Called Kwa-Ndabeni by the original residents, meaning "house of Ndabeni", the name literally means "place of debate", or "place of speaking and conversations", but the term was a nickname for Stanford, Under-Secretary of the Department for Native Affairs, with a meaning closer to "in the news".

In 1902, the bubonic plague broke out among the population which the authorities soon blamed on "these uncontrolled Kafir hordes" (Iliffe, p. 115) leading to many whites demanding segregation. According to the Cape Town Medical Officer of Health the living conditions of Africans were 'very undesirable, both from the point of view of sanitation and socially, by bringing uncleanly, half-civilised units into intimate contact with the more cleanly and civilised portion of the community". (Illustrated History of South Africa, pp. 314–5). It was as a result of this that Ndabeni was established, Cape Town's first black township (Richmond, p. 48). The location was, at the time, on the Cape Flats near a sewage plant (Iliffe, p. 115). "Natives who were living under insanitary conditions in the slums of Cape Town were offered accommodation at low rental in Ndabeni" (Wilson & Mafeje, p. 3), although several thousand remained in the city. Iliffe suggests the number moved to the township is in the 6,000–7,000 range, "many at bayonet-point". In an early example of Nimbyism local residents objected to Cape Town "shunting its kaffirs" in their direction. There were also complaints from Cape Town merchants that it would be inconvenient to have their workers housed out of town. The Cape Register replied in March 1901, "[T]he protection of the metropolis from the insanitary disease-spreading nigger is a much more vital matter than the convenience of a few St George Street merchants". (Illustrated History of South Africa, p. 315).

The black township was not to be tolerated within the city so, as the city grew, new townships were built on its outer edge and the community was relocated. In 1923 Langa was established about 5 km south east of Ndabeni, and it was to here that the population was sent before Ndabeni was dismantled. In this year, the Natives (Urban Areas) Act was passed, restricting the entry of black South Africans into the city (Western, p. 46).
