= Lwandile Zwelenkosi Matanzima =

South African clan leader (1970/71–2010)

Lwandile Zwelenkosi Matanzima (1970/71 – 22 May 2010) was a South African clan leader and ruler as king of Western Thembuland.

He was the son of Mthethuvumile Matanzima and grandson of the former President of Transkei, Kaiser Matanzima, and a great-great-nephew of Nelson Mandela.

Matanzima, the king of the Western Thembuland Kingdom was one of six traditional kings in the Eastern Cape of South Africa. The Thembu people were divided into two kingdoms by colonial authorities; Matanzima was ruler of the illegally colonial created Western Thembuland Kingdom while his uncle, King Buyelekhaya Dalindyebo, led the Senior kingdom, BakaDalindyebo. which is based at Bumbane Great Place in Mthatha. He had a wife, Phila.

King Matanzima suffered from declining health and was admitted to One Military Hospital in Pretoria, South Africa in 2009. He died unexpectedly at Life St Dominic's Hospital in East London, South Africa, on 22 May 2010, at the age of 39. He had vomited blood and complained of stomach pain the day before his death.
