= Thembuland =

Historical region in South Africa

- Natural region
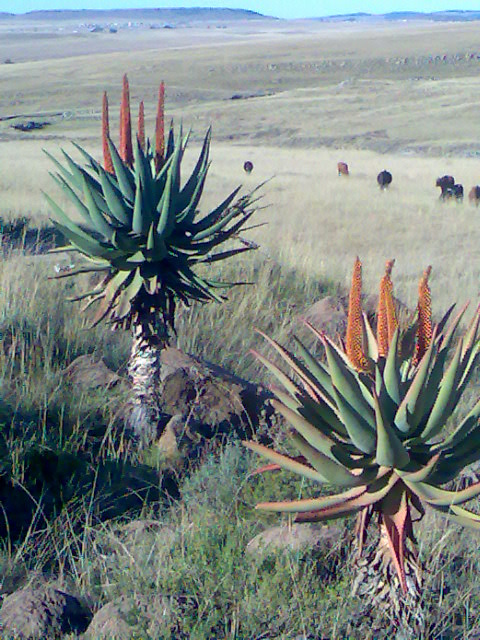
- Landscape in Thembuland near Ngcobo

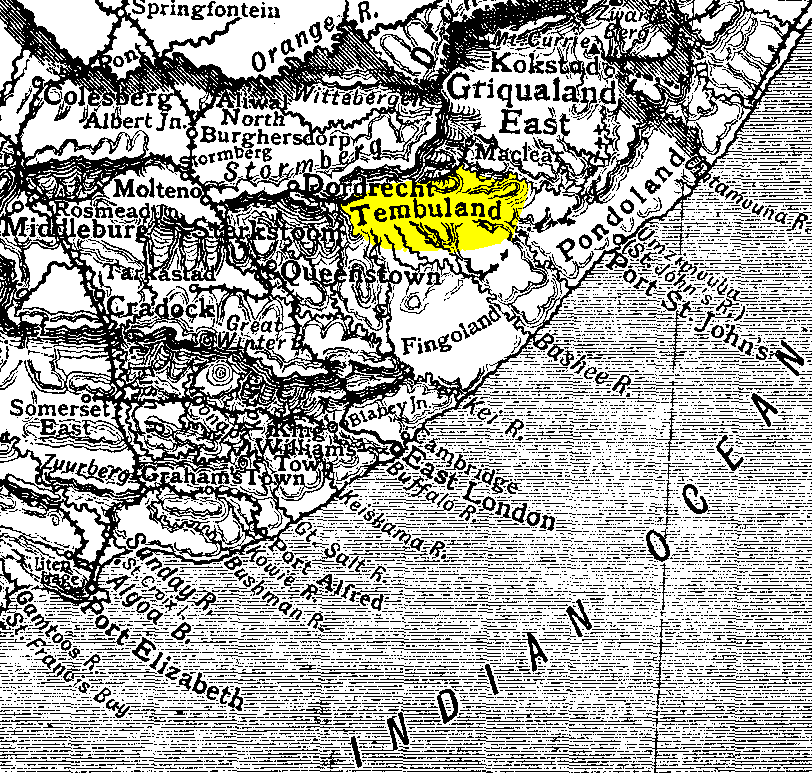
- Old map of the Eastern Cape, showing Thembuland (highlighted)
- Country: South Africa
- Elevation: 600 m (2,000 ft)

Thembuland, Afrikaans: Temboeland, is a natural region in the Eastern Cape province of South Africa. Its territory is the traditional region of the abaThembu.

It was formerly also known as "Tamboekieland" or "Tambookieland". The area of Thembuland proper includes present-day Mthatha, Mqanduli, Ngcobo, Mjanyana, Dutywa and Willowvale as well as their surroundings.

== Geography ==
Thembuland was historically defined as the area between Umtata and the upper Kei River. As such it formed an area of 50 by 120 miles, although its boundary was considered disputable with Pondoland on the coast, and with Fingoland just to the south. The definition of the area has also changed over time.

Before colonial conquest, it was divided into Tembuland Proper, Emigrant Tembuland and Bomvanaland—the Bomvana were a related people who lived on the east bank of the Bashee River, in what was later the district of Elliotdale. In colonial times it was defined as consisting of the districts of Emjanyana, Engcobo, Mqanduli, Umtata, St Marks, Southeyville and Xalanga.

== History ==
=== Early history ===
San hunter-gatherer communities inhabited the region in scattered nomadic groups from c. 30,000 BCE. In the 16th century, iron-working Xhosa people entered the area during their expansion. Once immigrant clans arrived in this region, they were conquered by Xhosa people, becoming part of the nation. They would later be given land and permission by the Xhosa Kingdom to rule themselves in the region now known as Thembuland.

Thembuland became an independent kingdom, ruled by the Hala royal clan. Beginning in the 19th century, Thembuland became embroiled in conflict with the neighboring British Empire. After the famine of Nongqawuse, the Thembu became embarked on a pan-Xhosa alliance. The Thembu Paramount-Chief, Ngangelizwe, had sought to unite the Xhosa federations including the Pondo and Bomvana tribes against the Cape Colony, but failed after an invasion by Sarili kaHintsa of the amaTshawe clan. The conflict had a personal side, as Ngangelizwe's Chief Wife Novili was the daughter of Sarhili, and rumours had been spread that Ngangelizwe had ill-treated her.

Facing severe military pressure from the combined armies of his enemies, Chief Ngangelizwe and his Ministers approached the nominally-independent Cape Colony to negotiate alliance and possible incorporation.

=== Incorporation into the Cape Colony ===
The Cape Colony, having recently achieved a degree of independence from Britain under the system of Responsible Government, operated under a relatively inclusive system of multi-racial franchise - whereby qualifications for suffrage applied equally to all male residents, regardless of race. Its laws also forbade any white settlement in traditional "Native territory". The Cape was therefore viewed by Ngangelizwe and his ministers as a satisfactory entity to merge with. Ngangelizwe however, was a highly controversial leader in the Xhosa-speaking community. He was hated by many in the neighbouring Pondo and Gcaleka states, and accused of a range of crimes. The Cape Government demanded his resignation, as a precondition for any annexation.

According to Cape Parliamentary records, the Thembu leaders demanded, among other things, four magistracies with equal access to the Cape's current system of multiracial franchise, and military support in the event of a conflict with the British and their Gcaleka enemies. If these conditions were incorporated into law, together with respect for the traditional authority of the chiefs, then they would request incorporation. The Cape government agreed to these terms and signed them into law with the Tembuland Annexation Act (1876), creating the magisterial districts of Xalanga, St. Marks, Elliot and Engcobo. Additional stipulations of the 1876 act were that the Thembu traditional government system was to get full government recognition; Thembu King, Chiefs and Subchiefs were to earn government salaries; normal taxation would only begin in 1878; the boundaries of Thembuland were final and were not to be altered in any way; and that the sale of alcohol be prohibited to Thembu subjects.

The resignation of the controversial Thembu King Ngangelizwe, in favour of his successor, had initially been demanded by the Cape government as a precondition for annexation, but this condition was waived as being impractical. Otherwise, the terms of the incorporation were implemented as stated. Traditional land ownership was fully recognised and, with the exception of a few missionaries and white traders, Thembuland was preserved for Thembu occupation, as part of the "Transkeian territories". However, the Colonial Office's overthrow of the elected Cape government in 1878 and assumption of direct rule over the Cape Colony caused the Confederation Wars, and the later disruption of the treaty's peaceful implementation.

The annexation was only finally completed in 1885. Thembuland was defined at the time as being the territory between Umtata and the Tsomo River, and home to 60,000 people. Thembuland also submitted troops to the Frontier Armed forces of the Cape Colony, who, in this capacity, fought several victorious campaigns against their Gcaleka and Mpondo enemies.

=== Early political restrictions ===
According to the original laws of the Cape Colony, as well as the terms of the Annexation Act, Europeans were prohibited from owning land in the Thembu territories. This was initially intended to prevent the dispossession of the Thembu by aggressive settlers, however in the ensuing political upheavals, the law was badly enforced.

From the 1880s, the pro-imperialist governments of Prime Ministers John Gordon Sprigg and Cecil Rhodes turned a blind eye to white incursions. Already by 1882, white settlers had illegally moved north of the Great Kei River and, in the same year, Chief Ngangelizwe himself sold territory within Umtata district to white land owners.

In 1894, the Glen Gray Act constituted the Thembu chiefs as leaders of "District Councils", thereby establishing a system of proxy rulers. The Government of Cecil Rhodes passed legislation, such as the Parliamentary Registration Act, that severely curtailed the voting rights of the Thembu and all Black African citizens of the Cape. However it was the Union of South Africa, in the Twentieth Century, that was to oversee the greatest growth in oppression against the people of Thembuland.

=== The Union of South Africa and Apartheid history ===
Later, in the lead up to the Union of South Africa and the beginning of Apartheid, the franchise and property rights of the Thembu were gradually revoked, and what rights remained were applied only in their original homeland.

Later still, under apartheid, the Transkei was turned into a bantustan. In the ethnic theory underpinning apartheid, the Transkei was declared as the "homeland" of the Xhosa people.

=== Secession dispute ===
The current Thembu king is King Buyelekhaya Dalindyebo, son of Sabata Jonguhlanga Dalindyebo, and his praise name is Zwelibanzi.

The King caused controversy in 2009, by calling for secession from South Africa, as a response to a criminal case against him. In December 2009 King Buyelekhaya was convicted of offences including culpable homicide, kidnapping, arson and assault. In response he proposed secession from South Africa and later demanded that the South African government pay the king R900m and the tribe a further R80bn in compensation for the humiliation caused by the criminal trial.

Dalindyebo was imprisoned in December 2015, released in 2019 and is back to rule his kingdom.
