= Sabata Jonguhlanga Dalindyebo =

Previous ruler of the Thembu Kingdom

Sabata Jonguhlanga Dalindyebo (1928–1986) was the ruler of the Thembu Kingdom. He was the son of Jongilizwe Sampu Dalindyebo.

His rule was marked by conflict with Kaiser Matanzima. This political conflict escalated until Sabata was arrested in 1979 for subverting the sovereignty of Parliament and the constitutional independence of Transkei, and for violating and injuring the dignity of the State President. Before his arrest Sabata had been described as "somewhat erratic" in habits, but was also respected for having moral authority in his resistance of luxuries and criticism of how Kaiser dealt with Apartheid-era South Africa. Sabata left Transkei due to the arrest and ultimately died in exile in Zambia.

Sabata was buried twice. His first burial was described as a "tawdry affair" that highlighted the tension between Kaiser and Sabata. His 1989 reburial is believed to relate to the efforts of Bantu Holomisa to align himself with Dalindyebo's legacy. Among the dignitaries on that day were Bishop Stanley Mogoba and the late Peter Mokaba. He had many children and upon his death the king was succeeded by his son Buyelekhaya Dalindyebo, who was jailed and released in South Africa.
