= Izibongo =

Genre of oral poetry in Bantu language

Izibongo is a genre of oral literature among various Bantu peoples of Southern Africa, including the Zulu and the Xhosa. While it is often considered to be poetry of praise, Jeff Opland and others consider the term "praise" (for "bonga") to be too limiting, since it can contain criticism as well.

== Subject matter ==
Noleen Turner distinguished four different categories: the praise of ordinary people (izibongo zabantu kumbe izihasho), of inanimate things (izibongo zezinto ezingaphili); of kings, and of great people (nezibongo zamakhosi/izibongo zabantu abakhulu abagqamile); and of clans (izithakazelo kanye nezibongo). Opland recognized three topics: people, animals, and objects, and noted that izibongo "is a poetry rooted, in subject and imagery, in the concrete", and that it does not treat landscape or emotion "in the manner of romantic or lyric poetry".

Somadoda Fikeni points out that regarding izibongo as pertaining only to famous people (a Eurocentric paradigm) discredits common people, women, young people—Fineki argues that izibongo is a central element in the life of the people, and that while not everyone can have an "imbongi-public poet", everyone practices izibongo one way or another, since "izibongo form a collective memory, conscience and soul of an African society, and they are spiritually-centered oral narratives which are repositories of Indigenous wisdom". Izibongo, according to Fikeni, express both a oneness with the universe and a collective memory, and an individuality rooted in history. Jeff Opland also stated that earlier studies (into the 1970s) of Bantu poetry tended to focus on "the poetry of chiefs and prominent people", though he recognized a number of insightful studies on poetry by women, for instance, starting in the 1970s.

== See also ==
- Isiduko, Xhosa clan names
- Oríkì, a similar concept amongst the Yoruba of West Africa
