= Buyelekhaya Dalindyebo =

King of the abaThembu (born 1964)

King Buyelekhaya Zwelibanzi Dalindyebo KaSabata (born 5 April 1964), reign name Zwelibanzi, is the king of the abaThembu people of South Africa since the late 1980s to present day. Dalindyebo is the son of the previous king of the AbaThembu King Sabata Jonguhlanga Dalindyebo, he is a direct descendant of King Dhlomu KaNxeko who founded the AmaDlomo dynasty, and currently the ruler of bakwaDalindyebo lineage.

As king, as of 2025, Dalindyebo receives at least R1.4 million, in addition to a car, medical aid and household expenses, from the government.

== Controversies ==
In May 2005, Dalindyebo was indicted for fraud, murder, attempted murder, kidnapping, and arson at the Mthatha High Court, and was subsequently convicted. In 2013, while he was appealing, the Democratic Alliance of South Africa recruited Dalindyebo into the party. It is surmised that he was chosen because he could bring votes to the DA in the Eastern Cape province.

In July 2014, a group of Thembu chiefs wrote to President of South Africa Jacob Zuma requesting that Dalindyebo be removed, claiming he was an "evil king" and "not fit to rule".

In October 2015, Dalindyebo was sentenced to 12 years in prison, and his membership in the DA was terminated. In December 2015, as Dalindyebo was due to start serving his sentence, he made last-minute efforts to avoid incarceration by petitioning Zuma for a presidential pardon. The petition was dismissed at the end of December, and he was incarcerated on 30 December 2015. A second bid for a presidential pardon was apparently launched in early 2016. In January 2016 there were reports that Dalindyebo had been on a hunger strike. Dalindyebo spent much of his first couple of months of imprisonment in the hospital.

On 23 December 2019, following president Cyril Ramaphosa's Day of Reconciliation speech, Dalindyebo was released from prison after serving a third of his sentence.

A royal imbizo was called to permanently remove Dalindyebo from the throne. Dalindyebo declared the imbizo invalid, and, according to reports in local newspapers, arrived at the royal residence, the Great Place, at 2 a.m. on the morning of 13 March carrying an axe. He then allegedly proceeded to attack the current acting king and his son, Azenathi, and his wife, who was later hospitalised. In an attempt to escape, Azenathi reportedly jumped out of the window of the palace. On 13 March 2020, Dalindyebo was arrested for assault.

Eastern Cape premier Oscar Mabuyane intervened, restoring Dalindyebo to the throne.

In the runup to the 2021 South African municipal elections, Dalindyebo received a cow and was promised a Mercedes-Benz SUV by the Economic Freedom Fighters, after which he announced his support for the party and called on the nation to do the same.

In December 2025, following a return from an Israeli state-sponsored trip, Dalindyebo launched into a profanity-laced tirade at a press conference witnessed by two journalists, before being escorted away by his entourage. Following his visit to Israel and comments that he would 'wipe everything out in Gaza', two AbaThembu royal houses announced another attempt to call a convocation to dethrone the king. Dalindyebo has publicly advocated for cooperation with Israel in areas including water security, healthcare, and agriculture, arguing that such partnerships could help address service-delivery challenges in the Eastern Cape. On his trip, he met with President Isaac Herzog and other officials and visited facilities focused on water management and medical innovation. Following the visit, he engaged in discussions with Israeli representatives regarding potential initiatives in the province, including possible hospital partnerships and water infrastructure projects.

== Personal life ==
On 1st September 2023 he married his sixth wife, Amangxongo princess and later Queen Khazeka Nolubabalo Mcinga Dalindyebo. Mcinga left after three months, stating that she felt unsafe.
