= Xhosa clan names =

Family Clan names of Xhosa people

Iziduko (pl.) in Xhosa are family names that are considered more important than surnames among Xhosa people. Many Xhosa persons can trace their family history back to a specific male ancestor or stock. Mentioning the clan name of someone is the highest form of respect, and it is considered polite to enquire after someone's clan name on meeting. The clan name is also sometimes used as an exclamation by members of that clan.The original Xhosa clans are AmaQhinebe,AmaBamba,AmaNywabe,AmaNzotho,AmaKhwemte,AmaNtakwenda including AmaQocwa, AmaNqarhwane, AmaSukwini,AmaCete, AmaGiqwa, Amangqosini and AmaGqwashu who were of Khoi origin it has to be noted that AmaJwarha,AmaCirha,AmaQwambe,AmaTshawe and AmaKwayi were not yet born during the formation of the Xhosa Nation they descendant from Nkosiyamntu.

When a woman marries, she may take her husband's surname, but she always keeps her own clan name and adds the prefix "Ma-" to it. A man and a woman who have the same clan name may not marry, as they are considered to be related.

The AmaMpondo have their separate lineage that is traceable from Sibiside to Dlemini to Njanya, to Mpondo and Mpondomise (twins) and Xesibe. The descendants of Mpondo are Santsabe, Sukude, Msiza, Ncindise, Cabe, Gangata, Bhala, Chithwayo, Khonjwayo, Ngcoya, Hlamandana, Tahle, Nyawuza and many others. The descendants of Xesibe are Ntozabantu to Ndzuza to Miyana to Bimbi to Nondzaba who begot Hlabe to Mthetho to Mtshutshumbe who founded the amaQwathi nation. Mtshutshumbe begot Mndwana begot Ncobe begot Nkovane begot Ntswayibana begot Dikela. The amaMpondo, amaMpondomise, amaXesibe and amaQwathi nations are related but the amaQwathi settled in Thembuland more than 350 years ago and as a result Qwathi chiefdom is more Thembu in culture and political association.

== Sources ==
- Mlungisi Ndima (1988). A History of the Qwathi People from the Earliest Times to 1910. MA Thesis. Rhodes University.
- Kirsch et al. Clicking with Xhosa (2001). Cape Town: David Phillips Publishers. p. 22.
- Makuliwe, Mpumelelo T.A. Iziduko zabantu abathetha IsiXhosa: isikhokelo kwintetho yesintu.
