= Ngubengcuka =

King of the Thembu people

Ngubengcuka Aa! Ndaba!, also known as Vusani, (c. 1790 – 10 August 1830) was the king of the abaThembu, in the eastern-southern part of Xhosaland (Eastern Cape). Ngubengcuka succeeded his father, Ndaba, as king in 1810. Known as Inkosi Enkhulu (Great Chief), Ngubengcuka united the Thembu kingdom before it was subjected to British colonial rule. He was the proverbial author and finisher of the modern kingdom that it eventually became.

Ngubengcuka had wives from the Great House, Right Hand House, and the Ixhiba, the lesser or Left Hand House. Among his many descendants is Nelson Mandela, a great-grandson via the Ixhiba or left-hand house. The name Mandela was first given to a younger brother of Simakade, the oldest son of the Ixhiba house.
