= Pondoland =

Coordinates: 31°20′S 29°15′E

Pondoland EmaMpondweni
- Natural region
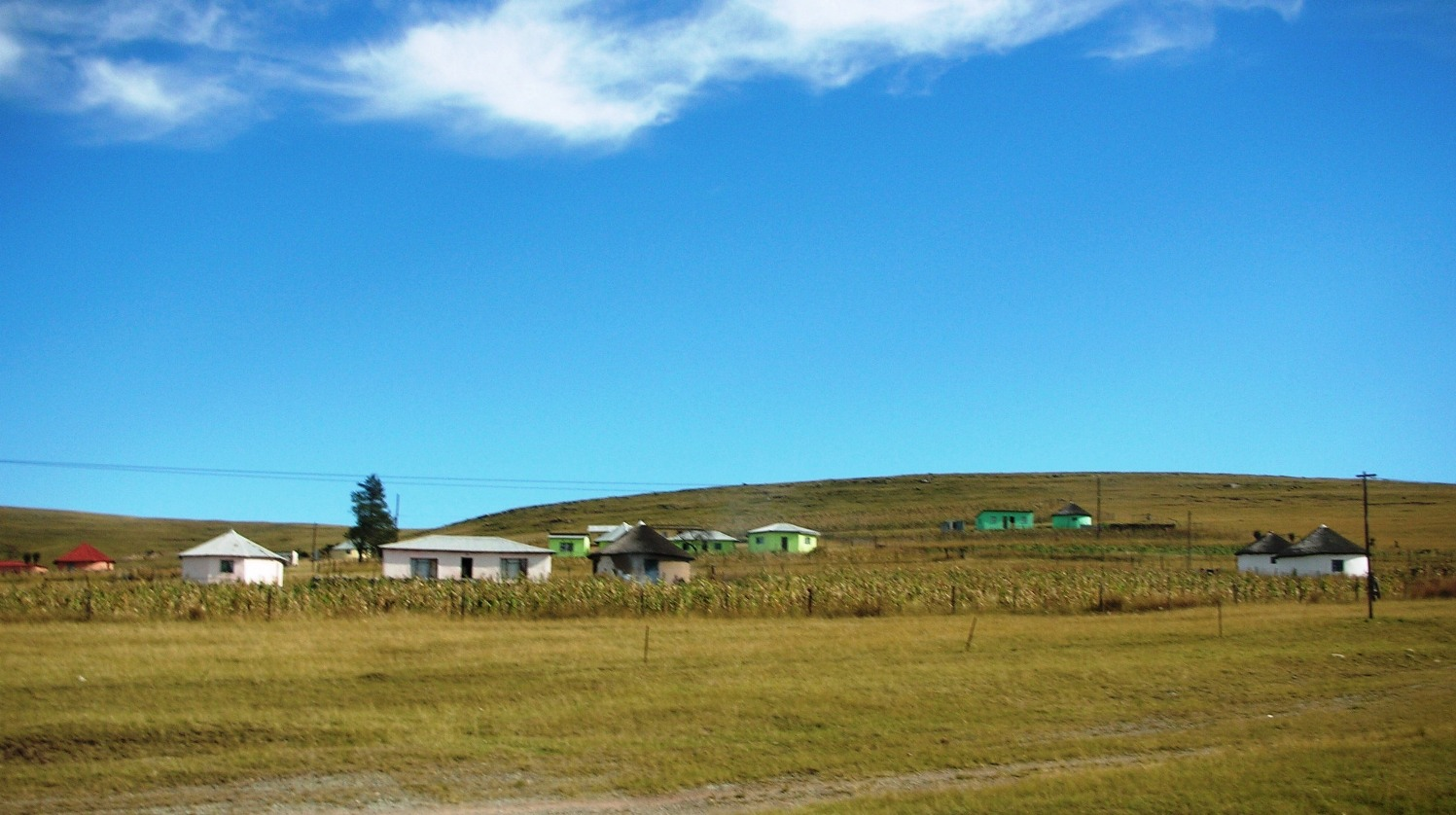
- Landscape in Mpondoland

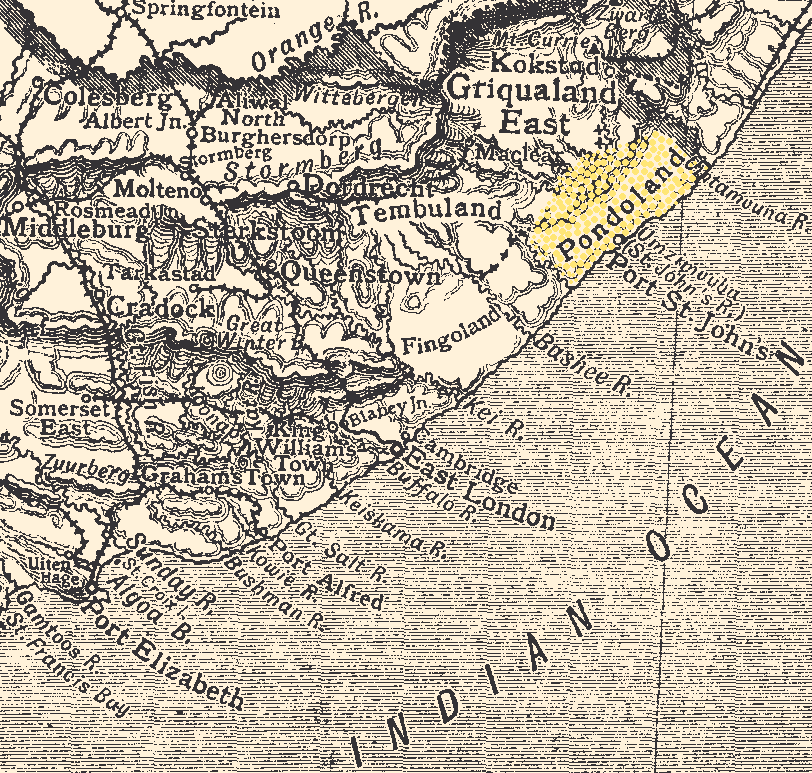
- Old map of the Eastern Cape, showing Mpondoland (highlighted)
- Country: South Africa

Location of Mpondoland in South Africa

Pondoland or Mpondoland (Mpondo: EmaMpondweni), is a natural region on the South African shores of the Indian Ocean. It is located in the coastal belt of the Eastern Cape province. Its territory is the former Mpondo Kingdom of the Mpondo people.

== Geography ==
Mpondoland stretches between the Mthatha River, whose mouth is its southernmost point, and the Mtamvuna River in the north along a coastal strip that is not more than 50 km wide. The Mzimvubu River divides Mpondoland into an eastern and a western region.

It is a mountainous area whose main vegetation consists in thornveld, grassland, as well as subtropical evergreen forests in the humid coastal valleys.

== History ==
Mpondo sub-group
- Person: umMpondo
- People: amaMpondo
- Language: isiMpondo
- Country: emaMpondweni

The Khoikhoi and San people had inhabited the region since ancient times in scattered nomadic groups. About 500 AD the Xhosa speaking Ngunis settled in the area, for the mountain grasslands were a good resource for cattle-rearing. Geographically Mpondoland was a remote area, not strongly affected by the events in the rest of Southern Africa. During the centuries of European navigation on the Indian Ocean, Portuguese ships, as well as ships from other colonial empires (such as the Grosvenor) ran aground at different spots of the coast of Mpondoland. Some of the castaways stayed in Mpondoland and were later absorbed into Mpondo communities. The Mpondo clan of AbeLungu traces its ancestry to a castaway English girl named Bessie, who married the son of Mpondo Chief Mathayi of the amaTshomane.

In 1820, Mpondo King Faku granted permission to the Wesleyans to establish a mission within his territory. A few decades later some German settlers came to Mpondoland and by 1885 German lieutenant Emil Nagel tried to establish a German colony, an effort that was unsuccessful. In 1886 the British annexed Xesibeland, traditionally part of the Mpondo Kingdom, and armed Mpondo people resisted the move by invading the territory, burning kraals and causing disorder. The segregation of Xesibeland was a first step prior to its annexation to the Cape Colony at the end of the same year. Finally Mpondoland as well became a British protectorate and in 1894 the amaMpondo were forced to accept the annexation of their own region to the Cape Colony.

The implementation of Apartheid legislation in the form of the 1951 Bantu Authorities Act led to the Pondo Revolt in 1960. After the quelling of the revolt, Mpondoland was made part of the Transkei homeland in 1963, which in turn became a nominally-independent bantustan in 1976. Finally the region, along with the other areas that were part of Transkei, was reincorporated into South Africa in 1994.

In recent times (circa 2010) the name of this traditional region of the Mpondo people has been revived for the Maputaland-Pondoland-Albany Hotspot biodiversity hotspot, the Maputaland-Pondoland bushland and thickets, one of the ecoregions of South Africa, and for the Pondoland Centre of Plant Endemism. It is also found in scientific works, as well as in the naming of species, such as the Pondoland palm (Jubaeopsis afra), the Pondoland ghost bush (Raspalia trigyna), the Pondoland conebush (Leucadendron pondoense), the Pondoland widow (Dira oxylus) and the Pondoland cannibal snail (Natalina beyrichi).

== See also ==
- AmaMpondo
- Kaffraria
- Wild Coast
- Xesibeland
- Transkei
- Anglican Diocese of Mthatha

== Bibliography ==
- Elephant Coast Visitor Guide, (2007/8).
- Pooley, E. (1993). The Complete Field Guide to Trees of Natal, Zululand and Transkei. ISBN 0 620 17697 0
- Gibson, Alan (1900) Reminiscences of the Pondomisi War
