= List of elections in South Africa =

This article lists elections for legislative or quasi-legislative bodies in South Africa.

== Parliamentary general elections ==
=== House of Assembly (1910–1984) ===
- 15 September 1910
- 20 October 1915
- 20 March 1920
- 8 February 1921
- 19 June 1924
- 14 June 1929
- 17 May 1933
- 18 May 1938
- 17 July 1943
- 26 May 1948
- 15 April 1953
- 16 April 1958
- 8 October 1961
- 30 March 1966
- 22 April 1970
- 24 April 1974
- 30 November 1977
- 29 April 1981

=== Tricameral Parliament (1984–1994) ===
- 22 and 28 August 1984 (House of Representatives and House of Delegates)
- 6 May 1987 (House of Assembly)
- 6 September 1989 (all houses)

=== National Assembly (1994–present) ===
- 26–29 April 1994
- 2 June 1999
- 14 April 2004
- 22 April 2009
- 7 May 2014
- 8 May 2019
- 29 May 2024

== Referendums ==
- Natal Union referendum, 10 June 1909
- Republic referendum, 5 October 1960
- Constitutional reform referendum, 2 November 1983
- Negotiated reform referendum, 17 March 1992

== Municipal elections ==
- 1 November 1995 (delayed to 29 May 1996 in the Western Cape and 26 June 1996 in KwaZulu-Natal)
- 5 December 2000
- 1 March 2006
- 18 May 2011
- 3 August 2016
- 1 November 2021
- 4 November 2026

== Bantustan elections ==
=== Transkei ===
- 20 November 1963
- 23 October 1968
- 24 October 1973
- 29 September 1976
- 24 September 1981
- September 1986

=== Bophuthatswana ===
- 4 October 1972
- 22–24 August 1977
- October 1982
- 27 October 1987

=== Venda ===
- 15–16 August 1973
- 5–6 July 1978
- July 1984

=== Ciskei ===
- 19–23 February 1973
- 18–22 June 1978
- Independence referendum, 4 December 1980
- September 1986

=== Gazankulu ===
- 16–17 October 1973
- 13 September 1978
- 7 September 1983
- 25 January 1989

=== KwaNdebele ===
- 8–10 December 1988

=== Lebowa ===
- 11 April 1973
- 15 March 1978
- 16 March 1983

=== QwaQwa ===
- 19–21 March 1975
- 19–21 April 1980
- 1985
- 1990

== Representative council elections ==
=== Coloured Persons Representative Council ===
- 30 September 1969
- 19 March 1975

=== South African Indian Council ===
- 4 November 1981
