= List of leaders of the TBVC states =

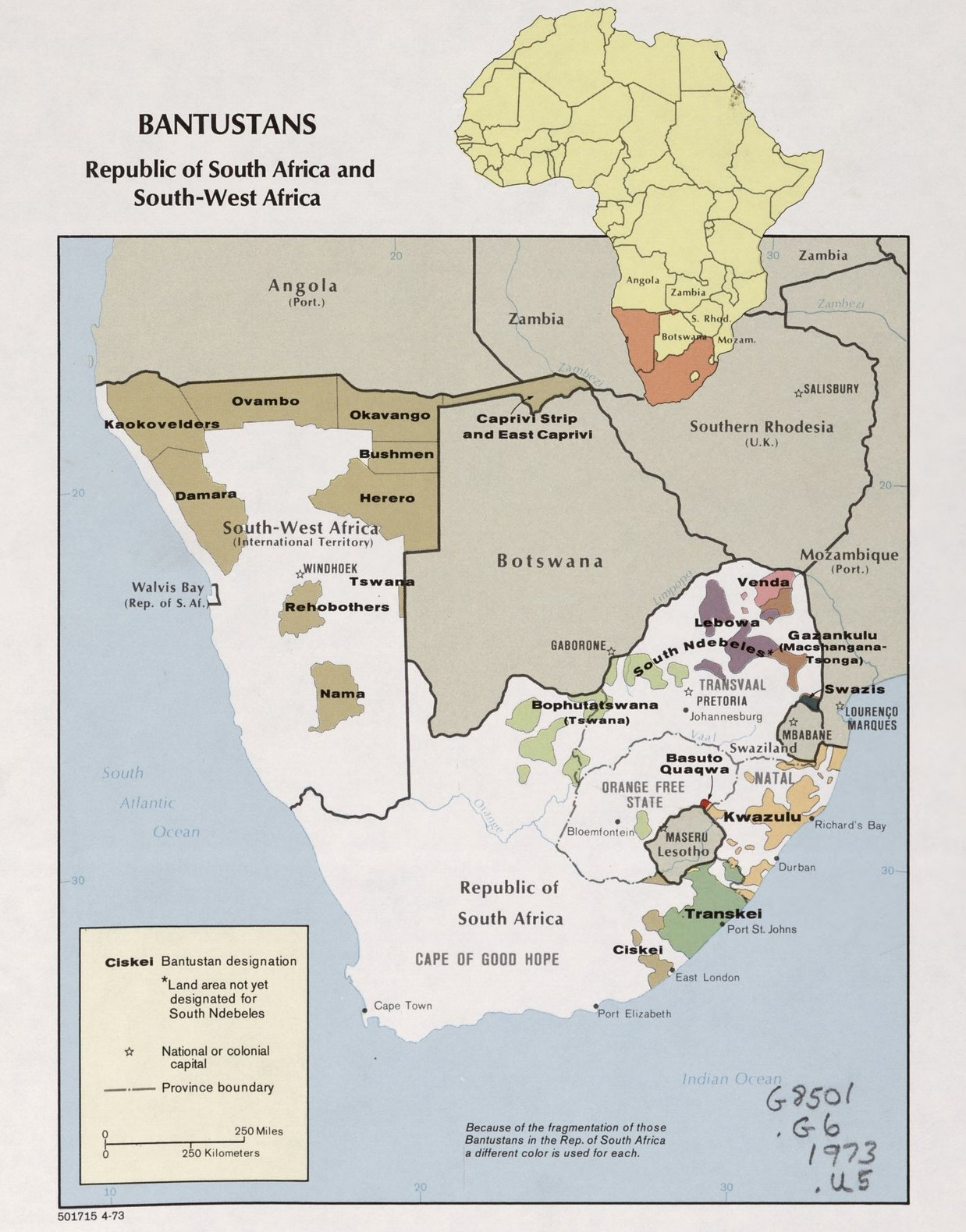
A 1973 CIA map of Bantustans in the Republic of South Africa and South West Africa (now Namibia).

This article lists the leaders of the TBVC states, the four Bantustans which were declared nominally independent by the government of the Republic of South Africa during the period of apartheid, which lasted from 1948 to 1994. Their independence was not recognized outside South Africa.

The bantustans with nominal independence were namely: Transkei (1976), (Note: The Status of Transkei Act 100 of 1976 granted Transkei "independence" with effect from 26 October 1976.) Bophuthatswana (1977), (Note: The Status of Bophuthatswana Act 89 of 1977 granted Bophuthatswana "independence" with effect from 6 December 1977.) Venda (1979) (Note: The Status of Venda Act 107 of 1979 granted Venda "independence" with effect from 13 September 1979.) and Ciskei (1981), (Note: The Status of Ciskei Act 110 of 1981 granted Ciskei "independence" with effect from 4 December 1981.) hence the abbreviation TBVC.

The TBVC states were reintegrated into South Africa in the wake of the first post-apartheid general election in April 1994.

== Transkei ==
Leader of Transkei
- Coat of arms of Transkei

- Flag of Transkei
- Incumbent; None
- Status: Head of state; Head of government
- Member of: Military Council (1987–1994) (head of government)
- Seat: Umtata
- Term length: No fixed term
- Formation: 6 December 1963; 62 years ago (head of government); 26 October 1976; 49 years ago (head of state)
- First holder: Kaiser Matanzima (head of government); Botha Sigcau (head of state)
- Final holder: Bantu Holomisa (head of government); Tutor Ndamase (head of state)
- Abolished: 26 April 1994; 32 years ago

Map of Transkei (red) within South Africa.

=== Heads of state ===
No.	Portrait	Name (Birth–Death)	Term of office			Political affiliation
No.	Portrait	Name (Birth–Death)	Took office	Left office	Time in office	Political affiliation
Presidents
1		Botha Sigcau (c. 1913–1978)	26 October 1976	1 December 1978 ^{†}	2 years, 36 days	TNIP
–		Zwelibanzi Maneli Mabandla (1906–?); Acting	1 December 1978	20 February 1979	81 days	TNIP
2		Kaiser Matanzima (1915–2003)	20 February 1979	20 February 1986 (Retired)	7 years	TNIP
3		Tutor Ndamase (1921–1997)	20 February 1986	26 April 1994	8 years, 66 days	TNIP
3		Tutor Ndamase (1921–1997)	20 February 1986	26 April 1994	8 years, 66 days	Independent

=== Heads of government ===
No.	Portrait	Name (Birth–Death)	Term of office			Political affiliation
No.	Portrait	Name (Birth–Death)	Took office	Left office	Time in office	Political affiliation
Chief Minister
1		Kaiser Matanzima (1915–2003)	6 December 1963	26 October 1976	12 years, 325 days	TNIP
Prime Ministers
(1)		Kaiser Matanzima (1915–2003)	26 October 1976	20 February 1979 (Become president)	2 years, 117 days	TNIP
2		George Matanzima (1918–2000) (Note: Brother of Kaiser Matanzima.)	20 February 1979	24 September 1987 (Resigned)	8 years, 216 days	TNIP
–		Dumnisani Gladstone Gwadiso (born 1952); Acting	25 September 1987	5 October 1987	10 days	TNIP
3		Stella Sigcau (1937–2006) (Note: Daughter of Botha Sigcau.)	5 October 1987	30 December 1987 (Deposed)	86 days	TNIP
Chairman of the Military Council and of the Council of Ministers
4		Bantu Holomisa (born 1955)	30 December 1987	26 April 1994	6 years, 117 days	Nonpartisan (Military)

=== Foreign ministers ===
Term	Name
1976–1980	Digby Koyana
1980–1983	G. T. Vika
1983–1986	Mtutuzela Lujabe
1986–1988	Caleb Songca
1988–1989	E. R. G. Keswa
1989–1992	Thembekile Enoch KaTshunungwa
1992–1994	Bantu Holomisa

== Bophuthatswana ==
Leader of Bophuthatswana
- Coat of arms of Bophuthatswana

- Flag of Bophuthatswana (1972–1994)
- Incumbent; None
- Status: Head of state; Head of government
- Seat: Mmabatho (1977–1994); Mafeking (provisionally, until 1977)
- Term length: No fixed term
- Formation: June 1968; 58 years ago
- First holder: Lucas Mangope (Chief Executive Officer of the Tswana Territorial Authority)
- Final holder: Lucas Mangope (President)
- Abolished: 13 March 1994; 32 years ago
- Superseded by: Administrators of the Transitional Executive Council

Map of Bophuthatswana (red) within South Africa.

=== Heads of state and government ===
No.	Portrait	Name (Birth–Death)	Term of office			Political affiliation
No.	Portrait	Name (Birth–Death)	Took office	Left office	Time in office	Political affiliation
1	Chief Executive Officer of the Tswana Territorial Authority					
1		Lucas Mangope (1923–2018)	June 1968	1 May 1971	2 years, 11 months	BNP
1	Chief Executive Councillor					
1		Lucas Mangope (1923–2018)	1 May 1971	1 June 1972	1 year, 31 days	BNP
1	Chief Minister					
1		Lucas Mangope (1923–2018)	1 June 1972	6 December 1977	5 years, 188 days	BNP
1		Lucas Mangope (1923–2018)	1 June 1972	6 December 1977	5 years, 188 days	BDP (From 1974)
1	President					
1		Lucas Mangope (1923–2018)	6 December 1977	13 March 1994 (Fled) (Note: Forced to flee during the 1994 crisis.)	16 years, 97 days	BDP
—		Rocky Malebane-Metsing (1949–2016) (Note: In rebellion staged by members of the military. Coup attempt crushed by the SADF troops.)	10 February 1988		Hours	PPP
Administrators (Transitional Executive Council)
		Tjaart van der Walt (1934–2019)	13 March 1994	26 April 1994	44 days	
		Job Mokgoro (born 1948)	13 March 1994	26 April 1994	44 days	ANC

=== Foreign ministers ===
Term	Name
1977–1987	T. M. Molatlhwa
1987–1990	Solomon L. L. Rathebe
1990–1991	G. S. M. Nkau
1991–1994	Thomas M. Setiloane

== Venda ==
Leader of Venda
- Coat of arms of the Republic of Venda

- Flag of Venda (1973–1994)
- Incumbent; None
- Status: Head of state; Head of government
- Member of: Council of National Unity (1990–1994)
- Seat: Thohoyandou (1979–1994); Sibasa (provisionally, until 1979)
- Term length: No fixed term
- Formation: June 1969; 57 years ago
- First holder: Patrick Mphephu (Chief Executive Officer of the Venda Territorial Authority)
- Final holder: Tshamano Ramabulana (Head of State [Chairman of the Council of National Unity])
- Abolished: 26 April 1994; 32 years ago

Map of Venda (red) within South Africa.

=== Heads of state and government ===
No.	Portrait	Name (Birth–Death)	Term of office			Political affiliation
No.	Portrait	Name (Birth–Death)	Took office	Left office	Time in office	Political affiliation
1	Chief Executive Officer of the Venda Territorial Authority					
1		Patrick Mphephu (c. 1924–1988)	June 1969	1 June 1971	2 years	NPV
1	Chief Executive Councillor					
1		Patrick Mphephu (c. 1924–1988)	1 June 1971	1 February 1973	1 year, 245 days	NPV
1	Chief Minister					
1		Patrick Mphephu (c. 1924–1988)	1 February 1973	13 September 1979	6 years, 224 days	NPV
1	Presidents					
1		Patrick Mphephu (c. 1924–1988)	13 September 1979	17 April 1988 ^{†}	8 years, 217 days	NPV
2		Frank Ravele (1926–1999)	17 April 1988	10 May 1988	1 year, 353 days	NPV
2		Frank Ravele (1926–1999)	10 May 1988	5 April 1990 (Deposed)	1 year, 353 days	NPV
Heads of State (Chairmen of the Council of National Unity)
3		Gabriel Ramushwana (1941–2015)	5 April 1990	25 January 1994	3 years, 266 days	Nonpartisan (Military)
4		Tshamano Ramabulana (1940–2020)	25 January 1994	26 April 1994	91 days	Nonpartisan (Military)

=== Foreign ministers ===
Term	Name
1979–1980	G. M. Ramabulana
1980–1986	A. M. Madzivhandila
1986–1989	Gota E. R. B. Nesengani
1989–1990	C. A. Nelwamondo
1990–1992	G. M. Ligege
1992–1994	V. S. Landela
1994	Gabriel Ramushwana

== Ciskei ==
Leader of Ciskei
- Coat of arms of Ciskei

- Flag of Ciskei
- Incumbent; None
- Status: Head of state; Head of government
- Member of: Military Committee / Council of State (1990–1994)
- Seat: Bisho (1981–1994); Zwelitsha (provisionally, until 1981)
- Term length: No fixed term
- Formation: June 1968; 58 years ago
- First holder: Thandathu Jongilizwe Mabandla (Chief Executive Officer of the Ciskei Territorial Authority)
- Final holder: Oupa Gqozo (Chairman of the Military Committee and of the Council of State)
- Abolished: 22 March 1994; 32 years ago
- Superseded by: Administrators of the Transitional Executive Council

Map of Ciskei (red) within South Africa.

=== Heads of state and government ===
No.	Portrait	Name (Birth–Death)	Term of office			Political affiliation
No.	Portrait	Name (Birth–Death)	Took office	Left office	Time in office	Political affiliation
1	Chief Executive Officer of the Ciskei Territorial Authority					
1		Thandathu Jongilizwe Mabandla (1926–2021)	June 1968	1 June 1971	3 years	CNP
1	Chief Executive Councillor					
1		Thandathu Jongilizwe Mabandla (1926–2021)	1 June 1971	1 August 1972	1 year, 61 days	CNP
1	Chief Ministers					
1		Thandathu Jongilizwe Mabandla (1926–2021)	1 August 1972	21 May 1973	293 days	CNP
2		Lennox Sebe (1926–1994) (Note: Gained power in the 1973 election.)	21 May 1973	June 1975	2 years, 1 month	CNIP
–		Charles Sebe (died 1991); Acting (Note: Brother of Lennox Sebe.)	June 1975	24 October 1975	4 months	Nonpartisan (Military)
(2)		Lennox Sebe (1926–1994) (Note: Proclaimed independence following the 1980 referendum.)	24 October 1975	4 December 1981	6 years, 41 days	CNIP
(2)	President					
(2)		Lennox Sebe (1926–1994) (Note: Declared president for life in 1983.)	4 December 1981	4 March 1990 (Deposed)	8 years, 90 days	CNIP
Chairman of the Military Committee and of the Council of State
3		Oupa Gqozo (born 1952)	4 March 1990	22 March 1994 (Resigned)	4 years, 18 days	Nonpartisan (Military)
3		Oupa Gqozo (born 1952)	4 March 1990	22 March 1994 (Resigned)	4 years, 18 days	ADM (From 1991)
Administrators (Transitional Executive Council)
		Pieter van Rensburg Goosen	23 March 1994	26 April 1994	34 days	
		Bongani Blessing Finca (born 1953)	23 March 1994	26 April 1994	34 days	

=== Foreign ministers ===
Term	Name
1981–1983	Ray Mali
1983–1990	B. N. Pityi
1990–1991	M. S. Manzi
1991–1993	Oupa Gqozo
1993	Thamsanqa Linda
1993–1994	Mickey Webb

== See also ==
- Bantu Authorities Act, 1951
- Promotion of Bantu Self-government Act, 1959
- Bantu Homelands Citizenship Act, 1970
- Bantu Homelands Constitution Act, 1971
- Foreign relations of South Africa during apartheid
