= 1990 Ciskei coup d'état =

Bloodless military coup d'état in Ciskei

- Map of Ciskei (red) within South Africa.
- Date: 4 March 1990; 36 years ago
- Location: (Ciskei) Bisho
- Type: Military coup
- Motive: Regime change
- Target: CNIP–led government of Lennox Sebe
- Organised by: Oupa Gqozo
- Participants: Ciskei Defence Force (faction)
- Outcome: Coup succeeds: The overthrow of authoritarian government of President for Life Sebe.; The establishment of military rule under the Military Committee headed by Brigadier Gqozo.

Topographic map of Ciskei.

The 1990 Ciskei coup d'état was a bloodless military coup in Ciskei, an unrecognised state and a nominally independent South African homeland for the Xhosa people, which took place on 4 March 1990. The coup was led by the then 37-year-old Brigadier Oupa Gqozo, the Chief of Staff Intelligence of the Ciskei Defence Force, against the government of President for Life Lennox Sebe (CNIP), who was on a state visit to Hong Kong at the time. The coup was followed by widespread rioting and looting, prompting Gqozo to request that the South African government send SADF troops to help restore order.

Subsequently, Gqozo's military government survived several coup attempts, most notably the February 1991 attempt, led by the Chief of the Ciskei Defence Force, Brigadier Andrew Jamangile. Gqozo stayed in power until his resignation in March 1994, several weeks before the reunification of Ciskei with South Africa after the first post-apartheid general election.

== See also ==
- Bisho massacre
- 1987 Transkei coup d'état
- 1990 Venda coup d'état
- 1994 Bophuthatswana crisis
