= Thandathu Jongilizwe Mabandla =

South African politician (1926–2021)

Justice Thandathu Mabandla

Chief of the Bhele Clan
- In office c 1959 – 22 December 2021

1st Chief Minister of Ciskei
- In office 1 August 1972 – 21 May 1973
- Preceded by: Office established
- Succeeded by: Lennox Sebe

Chief Executive Councillor of the Ciskei Territorial Authority
- In office 1 January 1969 – 1 August 1972
- Preceded by: Office established
- Succeeded by: Office abolished

Personal details
- Born: 16 August 1926 Tyume, Alice, Cape Province, Union of South Africa
- Died: 22 December 2021 (aged 95)
- Spouse: Nolusapho Phumla Ndamase (1935–2001)
- Children: Prince Langalivelile Ntabayikhonjwa Mabandla and Loyiso Mabandla
- Parent: Simolwana Mabandla (1879–1944)

Chief Justice Thandathu Jongilizwe Mabandla known as Chief Justice Mabandla (16 August 1926 – 22 December 2021) was a Xhosa chief from Alice in Eastern Cape.

== Education ==
In 1931, he started primary school at Mdlankomo before attending Grantville and St Barrabas, completing his primary studies at the later in 1944. He then attended Lovedale High School completing a senior certificate in 1948. Furthering his education, he completed a two-year course at Lovedale Training School and obtained a Primary Education Certificate in 1950. In 1963 he completed a Diploma in Bantu Law and Tradition at the Jongelizwe College for the Sons of Chiefs and Headmen.

== Career ==
Leaving the Lovedale Training School, he taught at various primary schools around the Ciskei until April 1959. His reign as chief of the Bhele tribe started in 1959. On 1 January 1968, he became the first chief executive councillor of the Ciskei Territorial Authority and later on 1 August 1972 ascended to newly created position of Chief Minister. In 1972 Lennox Leslie Wongama Sebe, a member of Mabandla's cabinet, broke with Mabandla and formed his own party, the Ciskei National Independence Party (CNIP). The CNIP became successful in 1973 and Sebe then became the new Chief minister of the Ciskei. In 1978, Mabandla and other members of his party crossed floors to the CNIP and Ciskei became a one-party state.

== Personal life and death ==
Mabandla married Pumla Ndamase, daughter of King Victor Poto Ndamase "Aa! Bhekuzulu", West Pondoland and sister to King Tutor Vulindlela Ndamase "Aa! Nyangelizwe", on 6 January 1960. He died on 22 December 2021, at the age of 95.

== Sources ==
- Ciskei Legislative Assembly (1968–1980). Debates of the session of the Ciskei Legislative Assembly.
- Vail, L. (1989). The Creation of Tribalism in Southern Africa. London Berkley: Currey.
