= 1986 Ciskei parliamentary election =

Parliamentary elections were scheduled to be held in Ciskei in November 1986. However, the 23 candidates of the Ciskei National Independence Party were the only ones to register, and were deemed to be elected unopposed in September 1986.

== Results ==
Party	Seats
Ciskei National Independence Party	23
Total	23
Source: African Elections Database
