= Setsoto Local Municipality elections =

Local elections in the Free State, South Africa

The Setsoto Local Municipality council consists of thirty members elected by mixed-member proportional representation. Fifteen councillors are elected by first-past-the-post voting in fifteen wards, while the remaining fifteen are chosen from party lists so that the total number of party representatives is proportional to the number of votes received.

In the 2026 South African municipal elections the African National Congress (ANC) lost its majority, but remains the largest party, with thirteen seats.

== Results ==
The following table shows the composition of the council after past elections.

Event	ANC	DA	EFF	FF+	PAC	Other	Total
2000 election	24	5	—	—	1	1	31
2006 election	27	4	—	1	1	0	33
2011 election	26	6	—	1	—	2	35
2016 election	21	5	3	1	—	3	33
2021 election	17	2	3	2	—	9	33
2026 election	13	5	4	2	0	6	30

== December 2000 election ==
The following table shows the results of the 2000 election.

Party	Ward			List			Total seats
Party	Votes	%	Seats	Votes	%	Seats	Total seats
African National Congress	18,577	75.89	15	18,537	76.20	9	24
Democratic Alliance	3,547	14.49	1	3,775	15.52	4	5
Alliance 2000+	1,326	5.42	0	1,010	4.15	1	1
Pan Africanist Congress of Azania	561	2.29	0	1,006	4.14	1	1
Independent candidates	469	1.92	0				0
Total	24,480	100.00	16	24,328	100.00	15	31
Valid votes	24,480	97.30		24,328	96.65		
Invalid/blank votes	680	2.70		842	3.35		
Total votes	25,160	100.00		25,170	100.00		
Registered voters/turnout	50,236	50.08		50,236	50.10		

== March 2006 election ==
The following table shows the results of the 2006 election.

Party	Ward			List			Total seats
Party	Votes	%	Seats	Votes	%	Seats	Total seats
African National Congress	19,969	80.93	17	20,076	81.24	10	27
Democratic Alliance	3,062	12.41	0	2,950	11.94	4	4
Pan Africanist Congress of Azania	592	2.40	0	469	1.90	1	1
Freedom Front Plus	422	1.71	0	441	1.78	1	1
Independent Democrats	405	1.64	0	386	1.56	0	0
United Democratic Movement	186	0.75	0	310	1.25	0	0
National Democratic Convention	37	0.15	0	81	0.33	0	0
Total	24,673	100.00	17	24,713	100.00	16	33
Valid votes	24,673	97.58		24,713	97.75		
Invalid/blank votes	613	2.42		570	2.25		
Total votes	25,286	100.00		25,283	100.00		
Registered voters/turnout	55,545	45.52		55,545	45.52		

== May 2011 election ==
The following table shows the results of the 1911 election.

Party	Ward			List			Total seats
Party	Votes	%	Seats	Votes	%	Seats	Total seats
African National Congress	20,849	74.28	17	21,316	75.34	9	26
Democratic Alliance	5,099	18.17	1	4,936	17.45	5	6
Congress of the People	1,138	4.05	0	1,397	4.94	2	2
Freedom Front Plus	518	1.85	0	288	1.02	1	1
Dikwankwetla Party of South Africa	397	1.41	0	356	1.26	0	0
Independent candidates	68	0.24	0				0
Total	28,069	100.00	18	28,293	100.00	17	35
Valid votes	28,069	97.32		28,293	98.16		
Invalid/blank votes	772	2.68		529	1.84		
Total votes	28,841	100.00		28,822	100.00		
Registered voters/turnout	57,669	50.01		57,669	49.98		

== August 2016 election ==
The following table shows the results of the 2016 election.

Party	Ward			List			Total seats
Party	Votes	%	Seats	Votes	%	Seats	Total seats
African National Congress	18,835	60.98	16	19,090	61.81	5	21
Democratic Alliance	5,076	16.43	1	4,935	15.98	4	5
Economic Freedom Fighters	2,693	8.72	0	2,629	8.51	3	3
United Front of Civics	1,398	4.53	0	3,259	10.55	3	3
Independent candidates	1,532	4.96	0				0
Freedom Front Plus	534	1.73	0	461	1.49	1	1
Congress of the People	532	1.72	0				0
Dikwankwetla Party of South Africa	205	0.66	0	177	0.57	0	0
African People's Convention	83	0.27	0	269	0.87	0	0
Inkatha Freedom Party				63	0.20	0	0
Total	30,888	100.00	17	30,883	100.00	16	33
Valid votes	30,888	97.46		30,883	97.42		
Invalid/blank votes	806	2.54		819	2.58		
Total votes	31,694	100.00		31,702	100.00		
Registered voters/turnout	59,053	53.67		59,053	53.68		

== November 2021 election ==
The following table shows the results of the 2021 election.

Party	Ward			List			Total seats
Party	Votes	%	Seats	Votes	%	Seats	Total seats
African National Congress	12,405	50.77	14	12,409	51.14	3	17
Setsoto Service Delivery Forum	5,597	22.91	3	5,542	22.84	5	8
Economic Freedom Fighters	2,174	8.90	0	2,263	9.33	3	3
Democratic Alliance	1,687	6.90	0	1,701	7.01	2	2
Freedom Front Plus	1,253	5.13	0	1,106	4.56	2	2
African Transformation Movement	320	1.31	0	304	1.25	1	1
Inkatha Freedom Party	193	0.79	0	228	0.94	0	0
Independent candidates	408	1.67	0				0
All Unemployment Labour Alliance	98	0.40	0	302	1.24	0	0
Forum for Service Delivery	158	0.65	0	160	0.66	0	0
Congress of the People	85	0.35	0	139	0.57	0	0
Power of Africans Unity	54	0.22	0	109	0.45	0	0
Total	24,432	100.00	17	24,263	100.00	16	33
Valid votes	24,432	97.88		24,263	97.36		
Invalid/blank votes	529	2.12		658	2.64		
Total votes	24,961	100.00		24,921	100.00		
Registered voters/turnout	55,718	44.80		55,718	44.73		

=== By-elections from November 2021 ===
The following by-elections were held to fill vacant ward seats in the period from November 2021.

Date	Ward	Party of the previous councillor	Party of the newly elected councillor
7 August 2024	8	Setsoto Service Delivery Forum	Economic Freedom Fighters

After the three August 2024 by-elections, the new composition of council was as follows:

Party	Ward	List	Total
African National Congress	14	3	17
Setsoto Service Delivery Forum	2	5	7
Economic Freedom Fighters	1	3	4
Democratic Alliance	0	2	2
Freedom Front Plus	0	2	2
African Transformation Movement	0	1	1
Total	17	16	33

== November 2026 election ==
The following table shows the results of the 2026 election.

Party	Ward			List			Total seats
Party	Votes	%	Seats	Votes	%	Seats	Total seats
African National Congress	12,615	44.16	12	12,855	44.97	1	13
Democratic Alliance	4,510	15.79	2	4,508	15.77	3	5
Economic Freedom Fighters	3,585	12.55	1	3,630	12.70	3	4
South African Communist Party	1,928	6.75	0	1,760	6.16	2	2
Setsoto Service Delivery Forum	1,828	6.40	0	1,762	6.16	2	2
Freedom Front Plus	1,579	5.53	0	1,638	5.73	2	2
ActionSA	569	1.99	0	586	2.05	1	1
African Congress for Transformation	461	1.61	0	461	1.61	1	1
African Independent Congress	338	1.18	0	220	0.77	0	0
African Transformation Movement	262	0.92	0	279	0.98	0	0
Patriotic Alliance	234	0.82	0	307	1.07	0	0
Afrika Mayibuye Movement	125	0.44	0	155	0.54	0	0
Inkatha Freedom Party	92	0.32	0	108	0.38	0	0
Independent candidates	186	0.65	0				0
African Content Movement	74	0.26	0	76	0.27	0	0
Congress of the People	81	0.28	0	61	0.21	0	0
African Christian Democratic Party	4	0.01	0	97	0.34	0	0
uMkhonto weSizwe Party	83	0.29	0				0
United Africans Transformation	1	0.00	0	47	0.16	0	0
Pan Africanist Congress of Azania	9	0.03	0	20	0.07	0	0
All Unemployment Labour Alliance	5	0.02	0	15	0.05	0	0
Total	28,569	100.00	15	28,585	100.00	15	30
Valid votes	28,569	97.69		28,585	97.87		
Invalid/blank votes	677	2.31		623	2.13		
Total votes	29,246	100.00		29,208	100.00		
Registered voters/turnout	60,134	48.63		60,134	48.57		
