= 1978 Ciskei legislative election =

Parliamentary elections were held in Ciskei between 18 and 22 June 1978. The Ciskei National Independence Party won all 50 elected seats. The election was preceded by a wave of arrests and intimidation of opposition party supporters, and 13 opposition candidates lost their deposits. There was also corruption in the operation of the election, as bribes of houses and money had been made to people to vote for the CNIP, and voters were forced to show their completed ballot papers to officials before voting.

== Electoral system ==
The Legislative Assembly had a total of 137 seats, 50 of which were elected and 87 of which were appointed.

== Results ==
Party	Seats
Ciskei National Independence Party	50
Appointed members	87
Total	137
Source: African Elections Database
