= Vice President of Ciskei =

The Vice President of Ciskei was a political position in that republic. The Vice President was appointed as a deputy by the President. Rev. Willie Xaba held the office between December 1981 and 1983.
