= 1994 South African general election =

First South African election held under nonracial, universal suffrage

- 26–29 April 1994

All 400 seats in the National Assembly 201 seats needed for a majority
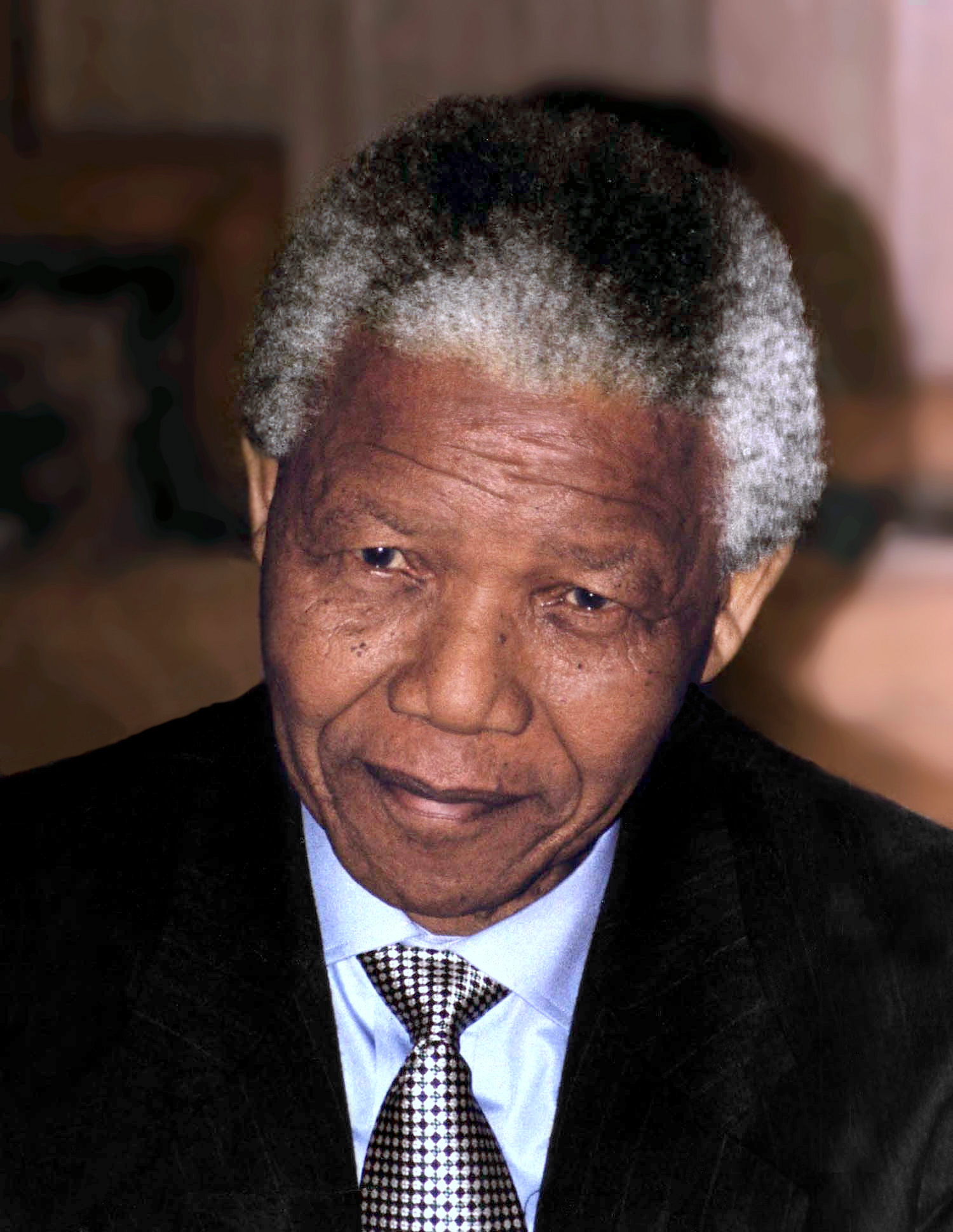

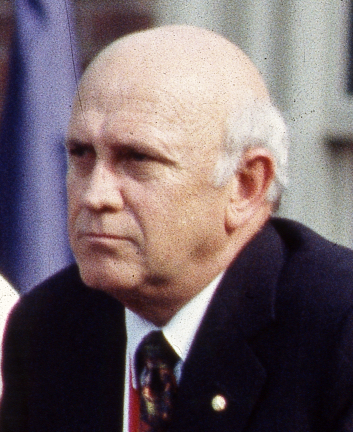

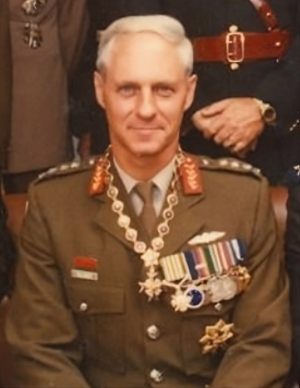

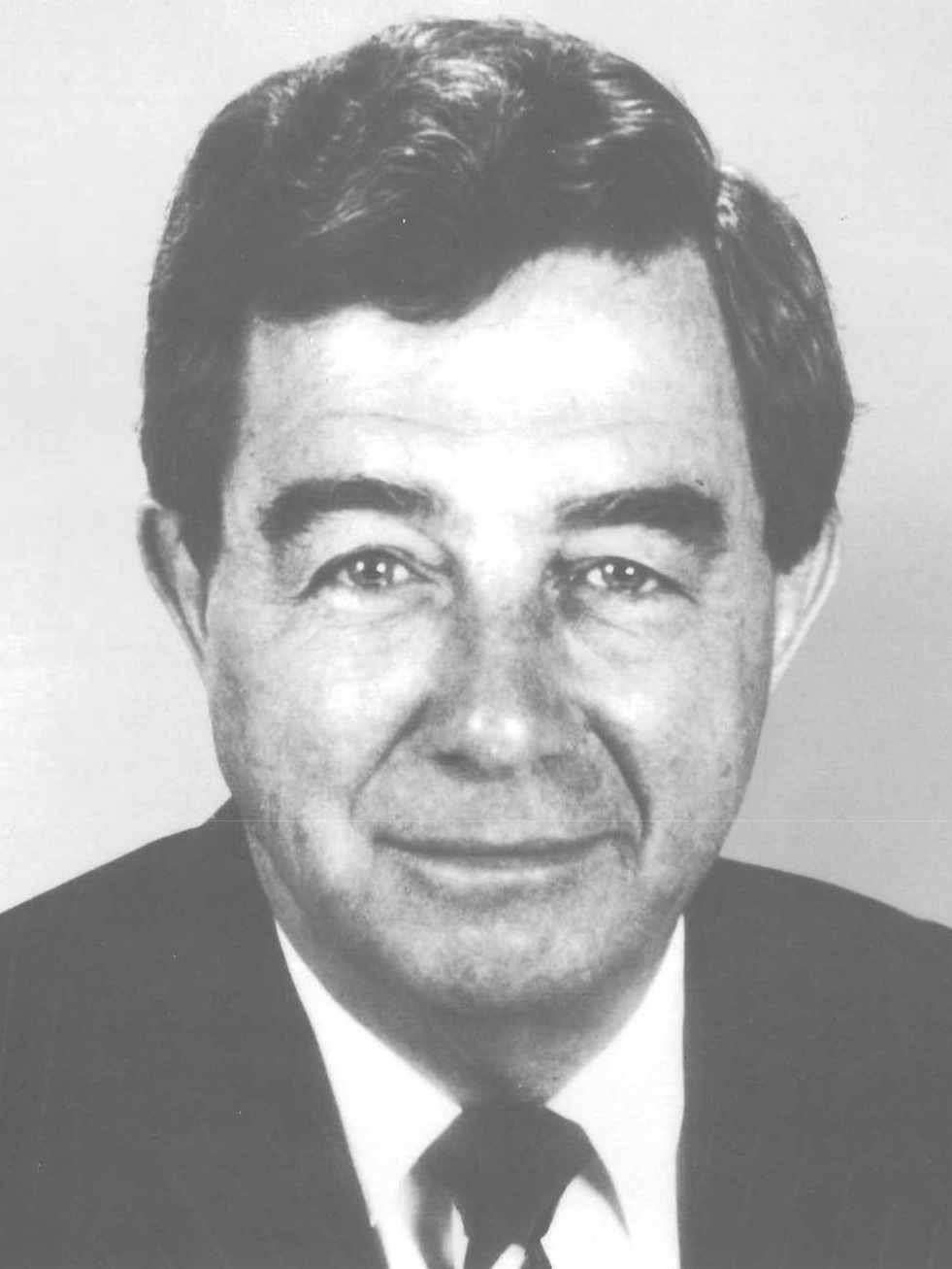

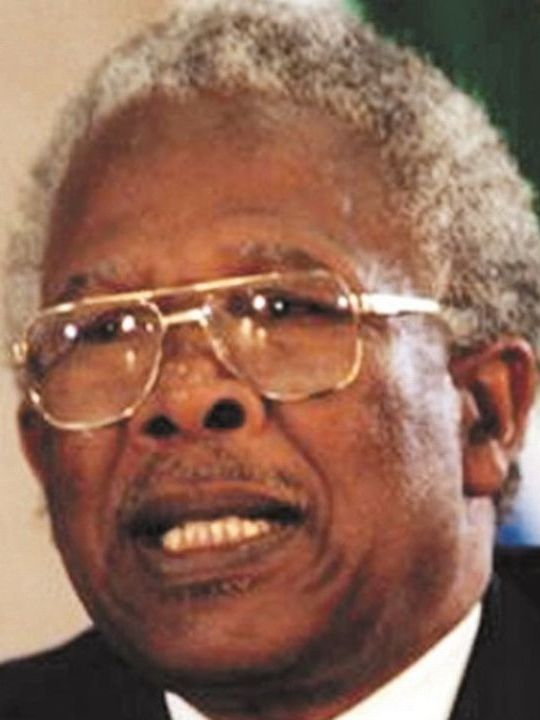
	First party	Second party	Third party
Leader	Nelson Mandela	F. W. de Klerk	Mangosuthu Buthelezi
Party	ANC	NP	IFP
Last election	Outlawed	48.19%, 94 seats	Did not exist
Seats won	252	82	43
Seat change	New party	▼12	New party
Popular vote	12,237,655	3,983,690	2,058,294
Percentage	62.65%	20.39%	10.54%
Swing	New party	▼27.80pp	New party
	Fourth party	Fifth party	Sixth party
Leader	Constand Viljoen	Zach de Beer	Clarence Makwetu
Party	VF	DP	PAC
Last election	Did not exist	20.00%, 33 seats	Outlawed
Seats won	9	7	5
Seat change	New party	▼26	New party
Popular vote	424,555	338,426	243,478
Percentage	2.17%	1.73%	1.25%
Swing	New party	▼18.27pp	New party
State President before election
F. W. de Klerk
NP
Elected President
Nelson Mandela
ANC

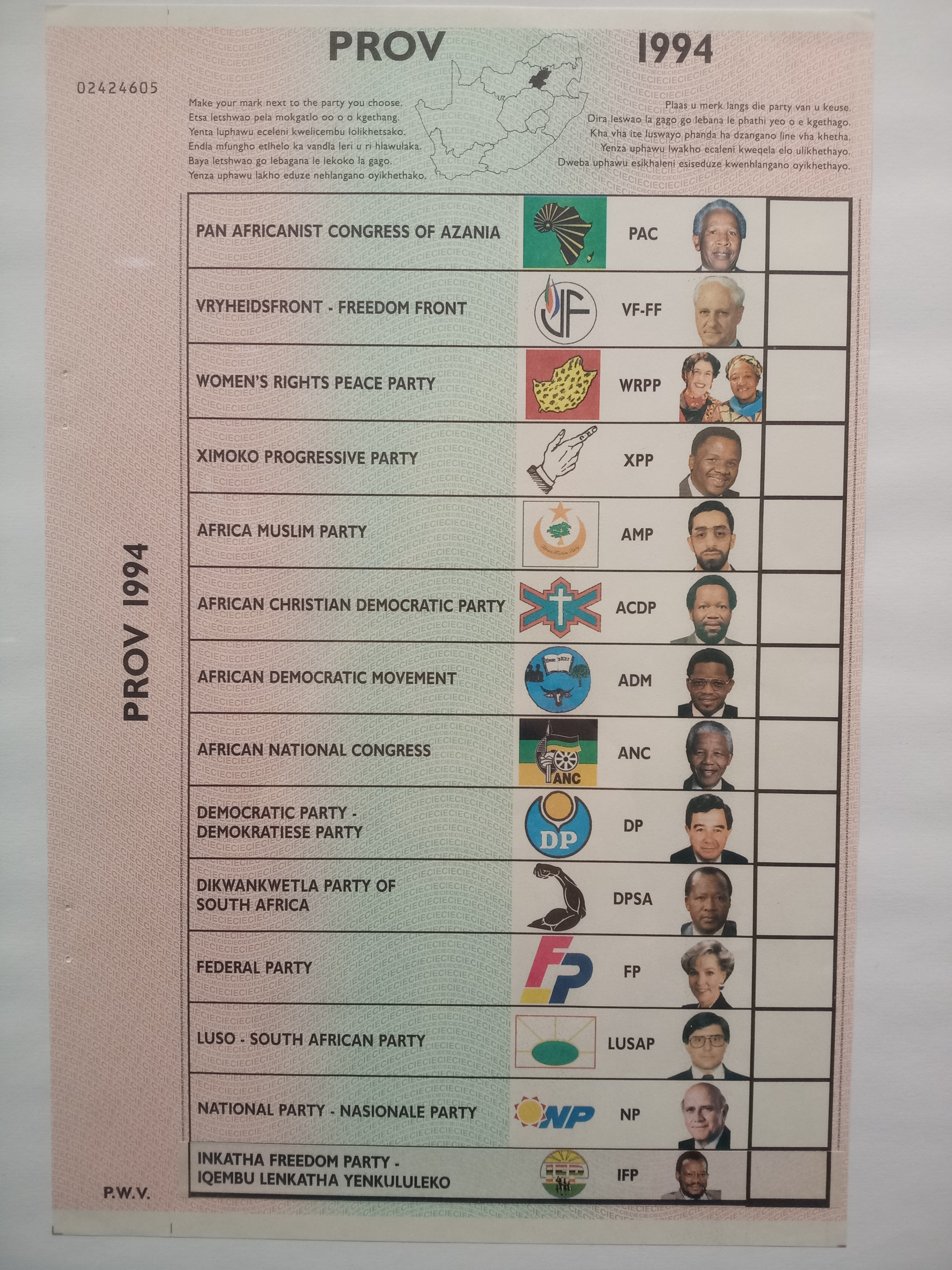
Ballot paper used in the 1994 election

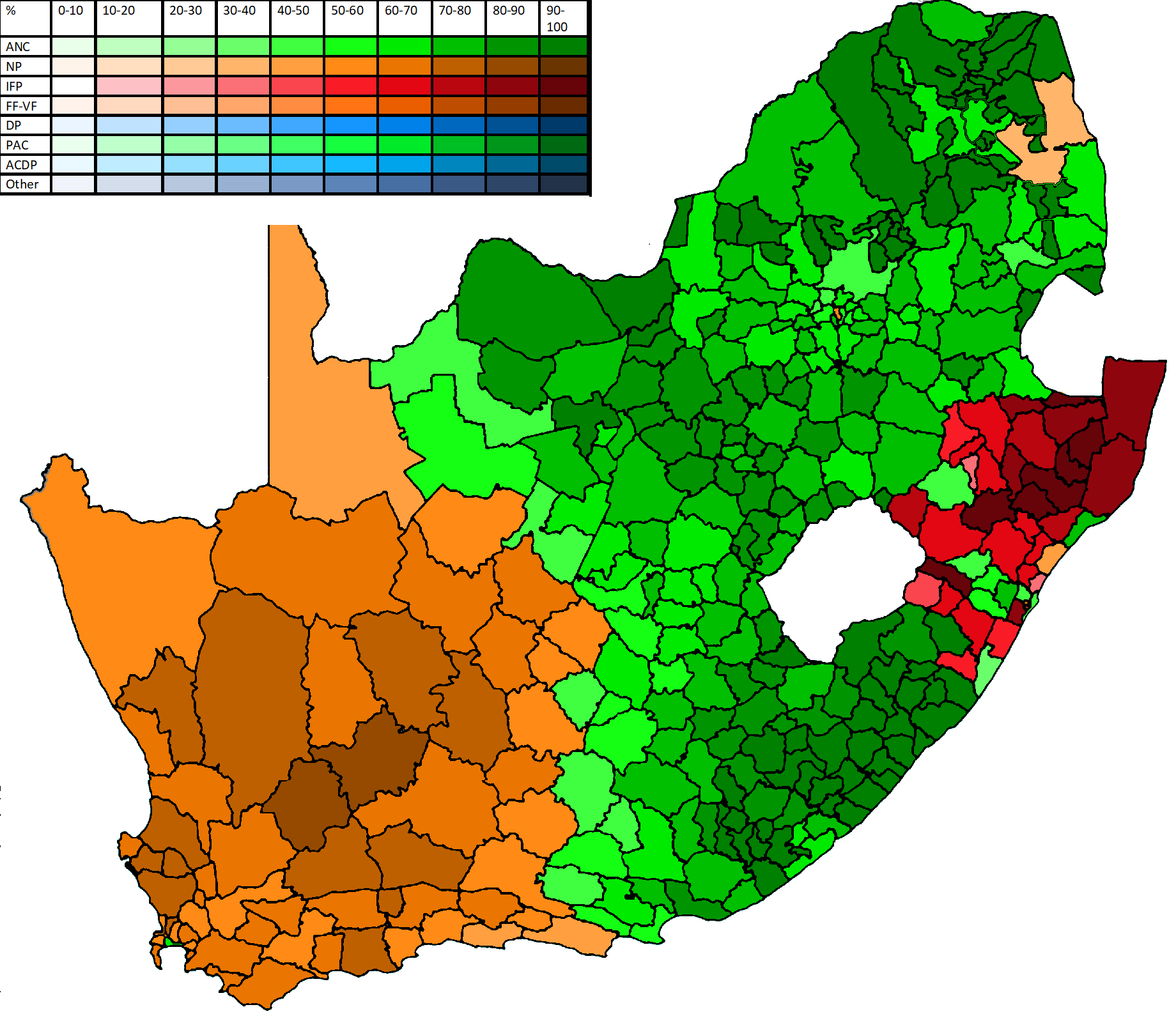
Share of each party's votes in the election

General elections were held in South Africa between 26 and 29 April 1994. The elections were the first in South Africa in which citizens of all races could vote, bringing an end to the herrenvolk democracy that had existed since 1948 and marking the country's first election under universal suffrage. The election was conducted under the direction of the Independent Electoral Commission (IEC), and marked the culmination of the four-year process that ended apartheid.

Millions queued in lines over a four-day voting period. Altogether, 19,726,579 votes were counted, and 193,081 were rejected as invalid. As widely expected, the African National Congress (ANC), whose slate incorporated the labour confederation COSATU and the South African Communist Party (SACP), won a landslide victory, taking 62 percent of the vote, just short of the supermajority required to unilaterally amend the Interim Constitution.

As required by that document, the ANC formed a Government of National Unity with the National Party (NP) and the Inkatha Freedom Party (IFP), the two other parties that won more than 20 seats in the National Assembly. The governing NP polled just over 20%, and was thus eligible for a post of Vice President to incumbent president De Klerk. The new National Assembly's first act was to elect Nelson Mandela as President, making him the country's first black chief executive. He then appointed the Cabinet of Nelson Mandela. The date 27 April is now a public holiday in South Africa, Freedom Day.

== Background ==
=== Apartheid ===
In 1948, the newly elected National Party government in South Africa began to institute apartheid, an institutionalized system of racial segregation that placed sociopolitical dominance in the hands of the European-descended white minority. Under the Population Registration Act, 1950, all South Africans were categorised by the government as White, Black, Coloured (mixed) or Indian. Suffrage was reserved for Whites, interracial sexual relationships were forbidden and over 80% of the country's land was reserved for the white minority. Members of the Black majority were stripped of citizenship under the Bantu Homelands Citizenship Act, 1970, and were instead made citizens of one of the country's "bantustans", territories reserved for various black ethnic groups. The South African government faced international condemnation against the backdrop of the decolonisation of Africa, and by the 1980s, the state was struggling with major internal political violence, a war of independence in Namibia and intervention in Angola and a failing economy burdened by international sanctions and the heavy costs of national security, effectively forcing the government to move towards political reform.

In 1983, P. W. Botha's government approved a new constitution, which implemented a Tricameral Parliament, with additional houses representing the Coloured and Indian populations. However, Blacks remained unrepresented in parliament, with political representation only existing under the bantustan system. Anti-apartheid groups opposed to the Tricameral Parliament instead reorganized under the umbrella of the United Democratic Front. The 1984 election to the non-white houses of parliament also faced widespread boycotts from Indian and Coloured voters. In 1985, the government introduced a sweeping state of emergency in response to growing civil unrest, which included sweeping restrictions on freedom of movement, freedom of speech and freedom of the press, particularly for non-White South Africans. In 1989, F. W. de Klerk was elected State President of South Africa, succeeding Botha. On 2 February 1990, de Klerk made a speech at the opening of Parliament in Cape Town, in which he unexpectedly announced his intention to unban anti-apartheid groups such as the ANC, SACP and the Pan Africanist Congress of Azania (PAC), to release political prisoners such as ANC leader Nelson Mandela and requested a process of negotiation with the anti-apartheid opposition. On 11 February, Mandela was released from Victor Verster Prison in Cape Town, after 27 years of incarceration.

=== Political transition ===
Formal negotiations between the ANC and the government were initially scheduled to begin on 11 April 1990. However on 26 March, police opened fire on protestors in the township of Sebokeng, killing 11 people. Consequently, the ANC cancelled the talks, and negotiations were only rescheduled for 2–4 May following an emergency meeting between Mandela and de Klerk. The "talks about talks" were held at the Groote Schuur presidential estate, and were intended to discuss terms before more substantive constitutional negotiations could begin. The parties jointly agreed to aim to end political violence, and to establish a joint working group. On 6 August, the government and ANC issued a further joint declaration, known as the Pretoria Minute, in which the ANC and its armed wing, uMkhonto weSizwe (MK) agreed to the suspension of armed activities, in exchange for the government lifting of the State of Emergency (then only active in Natal Province), further release of political prisoners from September 1990, and a review of certain provisions of the Internal Security Act. On 14 September 1991, 24 organisations signed the National Peace Accord, which included a code of conduct for political parties and security forces, and structures for the resolution of political conflict, such as the Goldstone Commission.

On 30 November 1991, 19 organisations announced that the first meeting of the Convention for a Democratic South Africa (CODESA) would be held in Johannesburg on 20 and 21 December 1991, in order to discuss constitutional arrangements. The CODESA 1 plenary session saw all participating groups, except for the Inkatha Freedom Party (IFP) and the government of the Bophuthatswana homeland, agree to a declaration of intent on establishing a united South Africa with common citizenship for all racial groups, and to promote peaceful political participation so that constitutional change could be advanced. Working groups were established with the aim of forming a constitution-making body, deciding the future of the bantustans, and establishing an interim government within a set time frame. CODESA 1 was not attended by the PAC, Conservative Party (CP) or Azanian People's Organisation (AZAPO). Around the same time, de Klerk's National Party government faced a series of whites-only by-election losses, leading his government to hold a referendum on 17 March 1992 on the continuation of the negotiation process. The NP and Democratic Party campaigned for a "Yes" vote, while the CP supported the "No" vote. The referendum produced a landslide victory for the government, with 68.3% of voters voting "Yes" for the process to end the apartheid system.

The second session, CODESA 2, convened at the Kempton Park World Trade Centre on 25 May 1992. The session collapsed following a deadlock on constitutional issues between the ANC and NP. In response to the failure of negotiations, the ANC announced a campaign of "rolling mass action", encompassing public protests and strikes in order to pressure the government to meet its demands. On 23 June, the ANC announced the suspension of talks after alleging government complicity in a 17 June massacre against residents of the township of Boipatong by supporters of the Inkatha Freedom Party. On 7 September, ANC supporters, marching against the government of Oupa Gqozo in the homeland of Ciskei, were opened fire on by the Ciskei Defence Force in the homeland's capital, Bhisho, killing 29 people. Despite the massacre often being cited as the impetus for a return to negotiations, the aftermath saw an escalation of political violence in Ciskei.

While negotiations between the ANC and NP had been suspended, unofficial talks were continued from June 1992 without authorization between Cyril Ramaphosa of the ANC and Roelf Meyer of the NP. The talks culminated in the official Record of Understanding between the ANC and the government on the 26 September, recognizing agreements reached between the two in meetings. On 1-2 April 1993, a new multilateral conference, the Multiparty Negotiating Process, was first attended at Kempton Park by 26 different organizations. The only significant absent groups were AZAPO and some Afrikaner nationalist organizations.

In October 1992, the IFP initiated the formation of the Concerned South Africans Group (COSAG) alongside the Bantustan governments of Bophuthatswana and Ciskei and the white pro-apartheid Conservative Party, in protest at its alleged sidelining during the negotiation process, and in order to ensure its representation among factions other than the national government and the anti-apartheid opposition. In June 1993, the IFP walked out from the MPNF in protest at the mechanism being used to determine the upcoming election date. Bophuthatswana and Ciskei continued participation until withdrawing in October, upon which COSAG was replaced with the Freedom Alliance, incorporating additional far-right elements. On 17 November 1993, an MPNF plenary meeting endorsed an interim constitution, under which non-racial elections were due to be held on 27 April 1994.

=== Political violence ===
Prior to the political transition, South Africa suffered from serious internal political violence, which intensified following the government's announcement of the negotiation process in 1990. Political violence was perpetrated by various actors, including the state, anti-apartheid groups, bantustan authorities, Zulu supporters of the Inkatha Freedom Party and pro-apartheid white supremacist groups.

Following de Klerk's speech in which he announced political reform, members of the far-right responded by attacking the British embassy in Pretoria and murdering a black civilian in Klerksdorp on 5 February 1990. On 4 March, military officer Oupa Gqozo overthrew the government of President-for-Life Lennox Sebe in the bantustan of Ciskei in a military coup, prompting two days of rioting which resulted in the South African government deploying troops to quell the unrest.

=== Conduct ===
Two days before the election, a car bomb exploded in Johannesburg, killing nine people. The day before the elections, another one went off, injuring 13.

The Afrikaner nationalist and pro-apartheid Conservative Party, the official opposition in the outgoing National Assembly, did not contest the elections. The similarly aligned Herstigte Nasionale Party, which had run in the white-only elections in 1989 also chose not to run.

There was some difficulty in organising the voting in rural areas, but people waited patiently for many hours to vote amidst a palpable feeling of goodwill. An extra day was added to give everyone the chance. International observers agreed that the elections were free and fair. The European Union's report on the election compiled at the end of May 1994, published two years after the election, criticised the Independent Electoral Commission's lack of preparedness for the polls, the shortages of voting materials at many voting stations, and the absence of effective safeguards against fraud in the counting process. In particular, it expressed disquiet that "no international observers had been allowed to be present at the crucial stage of the count when party representatives negotiated over disputed ballots". This meant that both the electorate and the world were "simply left to guess at the way the final result was achieved".

After initially announcing a boycott due to constitutional disagreements, the Inkatha Freedom Party (IFP) reversed its decision on 19 April, days before the election. It was added to the already-printed ballot papers by means of a sticker. In rural areas with limited infrastructure, people queued "for days" in order to vote.

At midnight on 26–27 April 1994 the previous "orange white blue" flag adopted in 1928 was lowered, and the old (now co-official) national anthem Die Stem ("The Call") was sung, followed by the raising of the new Y-shaped flag and singing of the other co-official anthem, Nkosi Sikelel' iAfrika ("God Bless Africa").

== Results ==
=== National Assembly ===
The 400 members of the National Assembly were chosen from party lists in proportion to each party's share of the national ballot.

Party	Votes	%	Seats
African National Congress	12,237,655	62.65	252
National Party	3,983,690	20.39	82
Inkatha Freedom Party	2,058,294	10.54	43
Freedom Front	424,555	2.17	9
Democratic Party	338,426	1.73	7
Pan Africanist Congress	243,478	1.25	5
African Christian Democratic Party	88,104	0.45	2
Africa Muslim Party	34,466	0.18	0
African Moderates Congress Party	27,690	0.14	0
Dikwankwetla Party	19,451	0.10	0
Federal Party	17,663	0.09	0
Minority Front	13,433	0.07	0
Sport Organisation for Collective Contributions and Equal Rights	10,575	0.05	0
African Democratic Movement	9,886	0.05	0
Women's Rights Peace Party	6,434	0.03	0
Ximoko Progressive Party	6,320	0.03	0
Keep It Straight and Simple Party	5,916	0.03	0
Workers' List Party	4,169	0.02	0
Luso-South African Party	3,293	0.02	0
Total	19,533,498	100.00	400
Valid votes	19,533,498	99.02	
Invalid/blank votes	193,112	0.98	
Total votes	19,726,610	100.00	
Source: African Elections Database

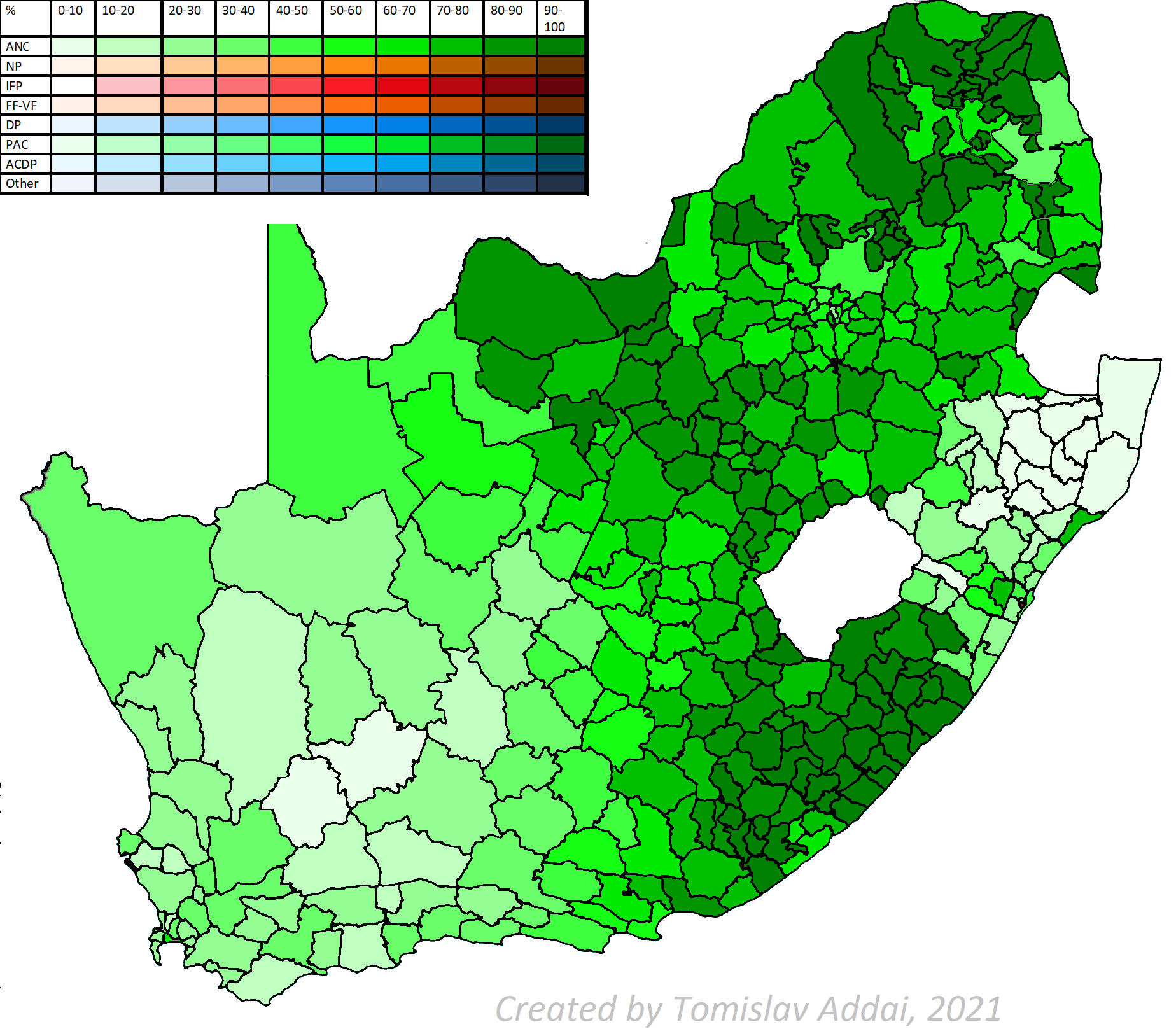
ANC Party vote

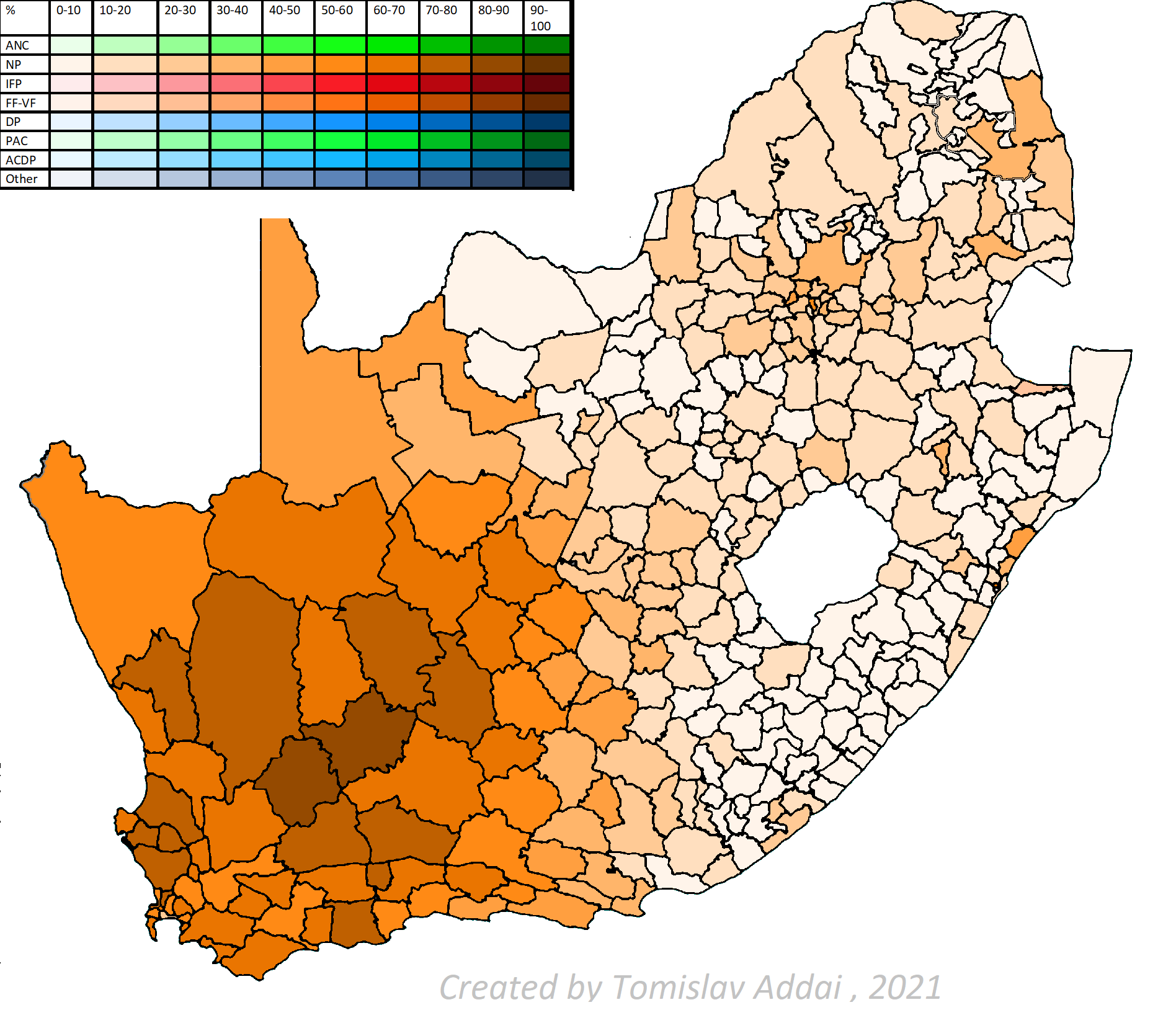
National Party vote

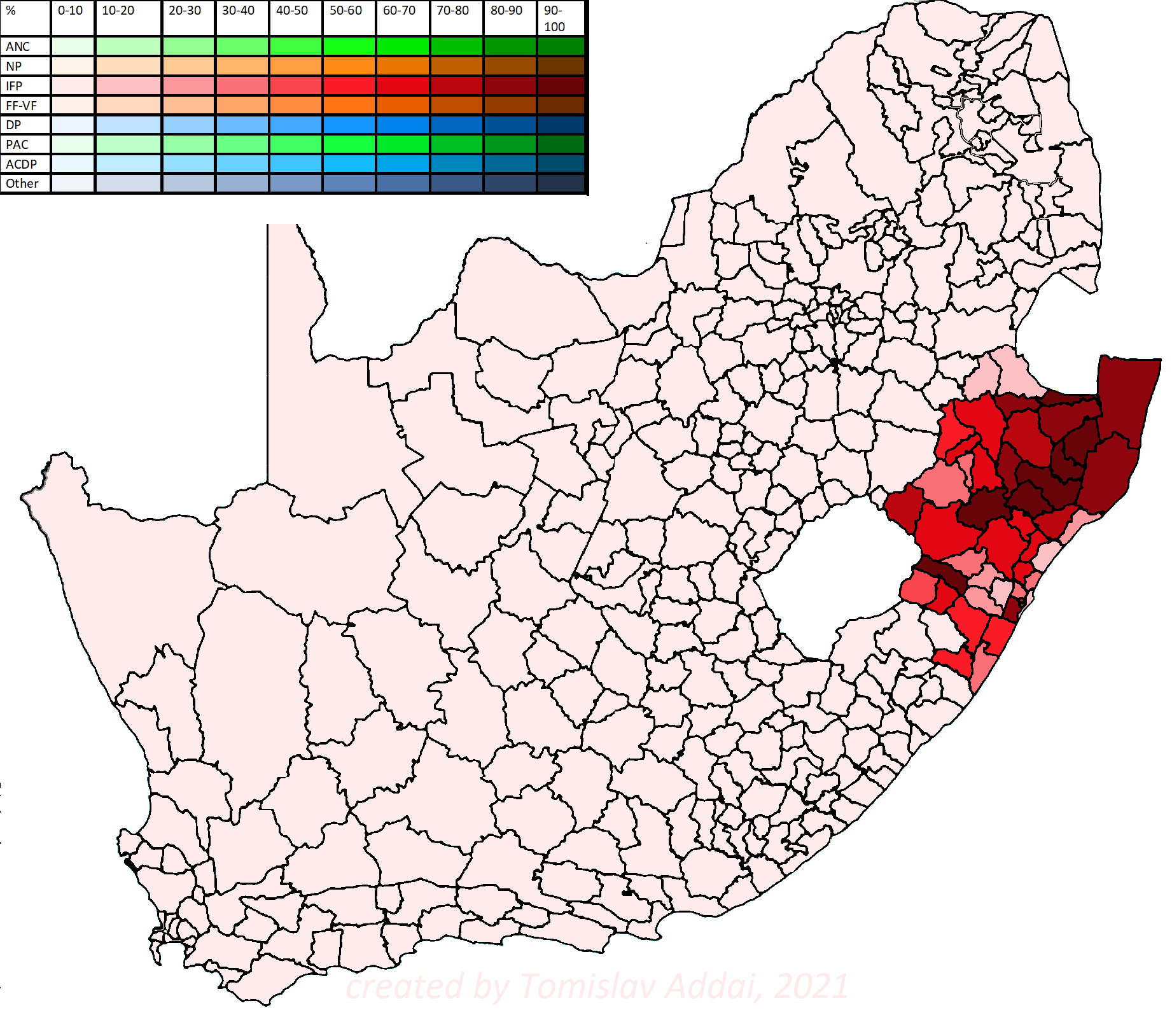
Inkatha Freedom Party vote

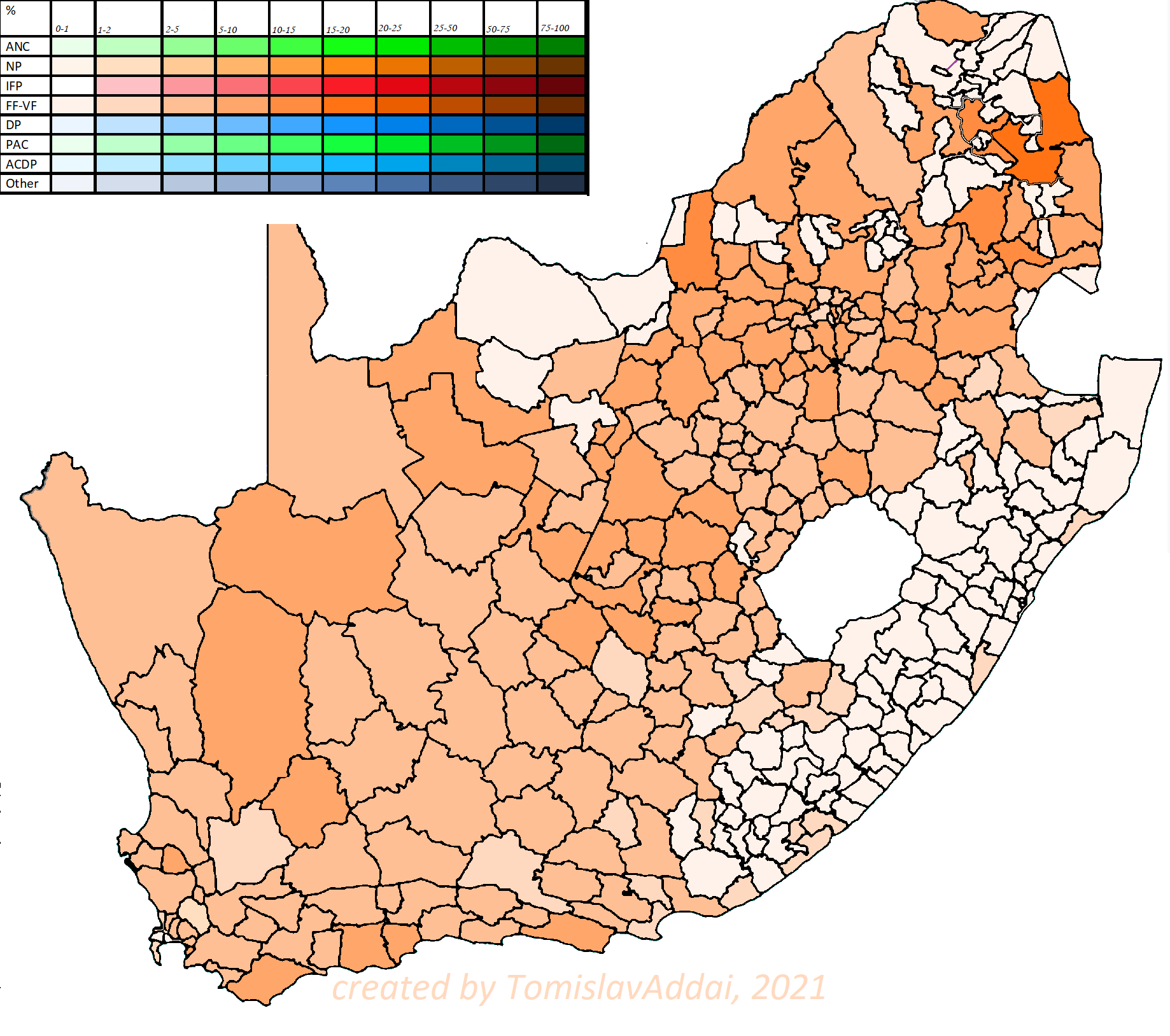
Freedom Front Party vote

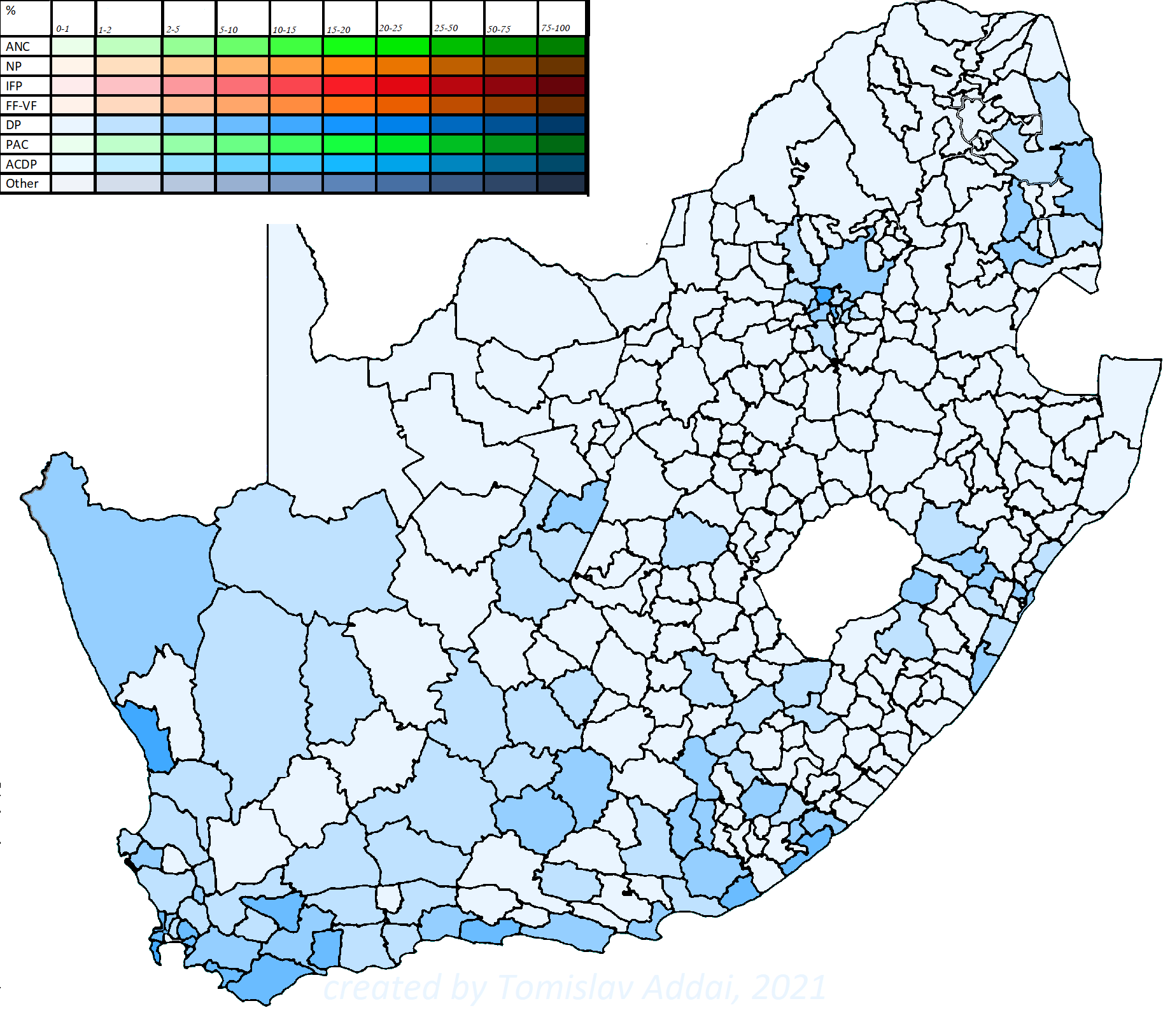
DP Party vote

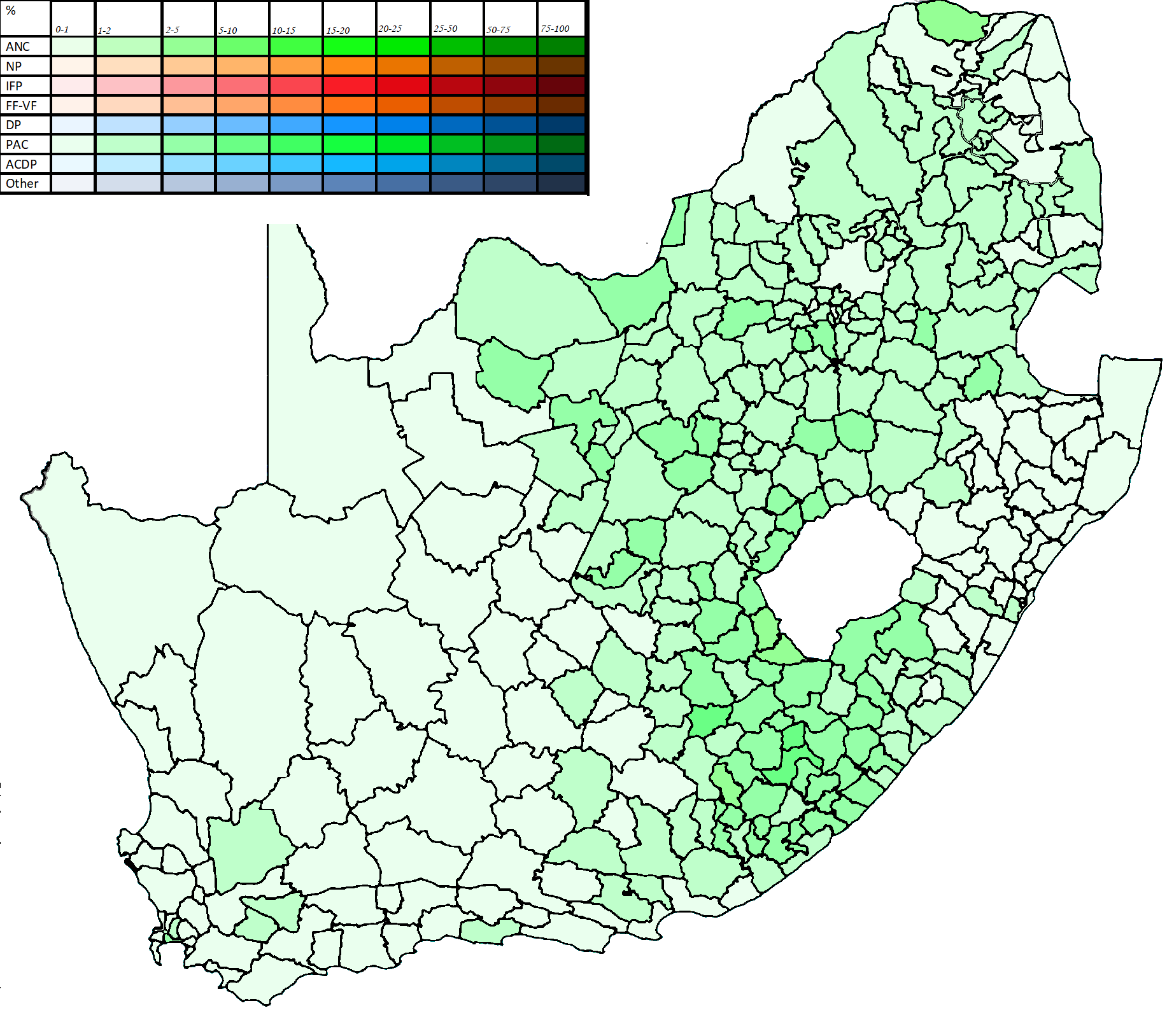
PAC Party vote

=== Senate ===
The 90 members of the Senate were chosen, 10 from each province, by the newly elected provincial legislatures. Each province's Senate seats were allocated in proportion to the parties' representation in the provincial legislature.

Determination of seats in the Senate as a consequence of the 26–29 April 1994 provincial elections
Party	Sum of votes in the Provincial elections		Seats in the Senate									
Party	Votes	%	EC	FS	G	KZN	M	NW	NC	NP	WC	Total
African National Congress	12,137,307	62.29	9	8	6	3	8	8	5	10	3	60
National Party	3,492,467	17.92	1	1	2	1	1	1	4		6	17
Inkatha Freedom Party	2,047,083	10.51				5						5
Freedom Front	639,643	3.28		1	1		1	1	1			5
Democratic Party	538,655	2.76			1	1					1	3
Total			10	10	10	10	10	10	10	10	10	90
Source: Constitution of South Africa

In 1997, on the adoption of the final Constitution, the Senate became the National Council of Provinces; its political makeup remained the same, but members were divided into permanent and special delegates, as described in the following table.

Initial determination of delegates to the National Council of Provinces at the adoption of the new Constitution on 4 February 1997
Party	Delegate type	EC	FS	G	KZN	M	NW	NC	NP	WC	Total	
African National Congress	Permanent	5	4	3	1	4	4	3	6	2	32	60
African National Congress	Special	4	4	3	2	4	4	2	4	1	28	60
National Party	Permanent	1	1	1	1	1	1	2		3	11	17
National Party	Special			1				2		3	6	17
Inkatha Freedom Party	Permanent				3						3	5
Inkatha Freedom Party	Special				2						2	5
Freedom Front	Permanent		1	1		1	1	1			5	
Democratic Party	Permanent			1	1					1	3	
Total		10	10	10	10	10	10	10	10	10	90	
Source: Constitution of South Africa

== Provincial legislature results ==
Members of the provincial legislatures were elected from party lists in proportion to each party's share of the provincial ballot.

Party	Votes	%	EC	FS	G	KZN	M	NW	NC	NP	WC	Total
ANC	12,137,307	62.29	48	24	50	26	25	26	15	38	14	266
National	3,492,467	17.92	6	4	21	9	3	3	12	1	23	82
IFP	2,047,083	10.51	0	0	3	41	0	0	0	0	0	44
Freedom Front	639,643	3.28	0	2	5	0	2	1	2	1	1	14
Democratic	538,655	2.76	1	0	5	2	0	0	1	0	3	12
PAC	271,793	1.39	1	0	1	1	0	0	0	0	0	3
ACDP	117,825	0.60	0	0	1	1	0	0	0	0	1	3
Africa Muslim Party	51,773	0.27	0	0	0	0	0	0	0	0	0	0
MF	48,951	0.25	0	0	0	1	0	0	0	0	0	1
African Democratic Movement	34,233	0.18	0	0	0	0	0	0	0	0	0	0
Dikwankwetla Party	21,877	0.11	0	0	0	0	0	0	0	0	0	0
Islamic Party	16,762	0.09	0	0	0	0	0	0	0	0	0	0
Federal Party	16,279	0.08	0	0	0	0	0	0	0	0	0	0
FPU	10,123	0.05	0	0	0	0	0	0	0	0	0	0
Ximoko Progressive Party	8,238	0.04	0	0	0	0	0	0	0	0	0	0
Women's Rights Peace Party	7,279	0.04	0	0	0	0	0	0	0	0	0	0
Wes-Kaap Federaliste Party	6,337	0.03	0	0	0	0	0	0	0	0	0	0
Workers International to Rebuild the Fourth International	5,481	0.03	0	0	0	0	0	0	0	0	0	0
Luso-South African Party	5,423	0.03	0	0	0	0	0	0	0	0	0	0
South African Women's Party	2,641	0.01	0	0	0	0	0	0	0	0	0	0
Green Party	2,611	0.01	0	0	0	0	0	0	0	0	0	0
Merit Party	2,028	0.01	0	0	0	0	0	0	0	0	0	0
Right Party	921	0.00	0	0	0	0	0	0	0	0	0	0
Total	19,485,730	100.00	56	30	86	81	30	30	30	40	42	425
Valid votes	19,485,730	99.25										
Invalid/blank votes	147,841	0.75										
Total votes	19,633,571	100.00										

=== Eastern Cape ===
Party	Votes	%	Seats
African National Congress	2,453,790	84.35	48
National Party	286,029	9.83	6
Democratic Party	59,644	2.05	1
Pan Africanist Congress	59,475	2.04	1
Freedom Front	23,167	0.80	0
African Christian Democratic Party	14,908	0.51	0
Inkatha Freedom Party	5,050	0.17	0
African Democratic Movement	4,815	0.17	0
Merit Party	2,028	0.07	0
Total	2,908,906	100.00	56
Valid votes	2,908,906	99.55	
Invalid/blank votes	13,248	0.45	
Total votes	2,922,154	100.00	
Source: Election Resources

=== Free State ===
Party	Votes	%	Seats
African National Congress	1,037,998	76.65	24
National Party	170,452	12.59	4
Freedom Front	81,662	6.03	2
Pan Africanist Congress	24,451	1.81	0
Dikwankwetla Party	17,024	1.26	0
Democratic Party	7,664	0.57	0
Inkatha Freedom Party	6,935	0.51	0
African Christian Democratic Party	6,072	0.45	0
African Democratic Movement	2,008	0.15	0
Total	1,354,266	100.00	30
Valid votes	1,354,266	99.25	
Invalid/blank votes	10,286	0.75	
Total votes	1,364,552	100.00	
Source: Election Resources

=== Gauteng ===
Party	Votes	%	Seats
African National Congress	2,418,257	57.60	50
National Party	1,002,540	23.88	21
Freedom Front	258,935	6.17	5
Democratic Party	223,548	5.32	5
Inkatha Freedom Party	153,567	3.66	3
Pan Africanist Congress	61,512	1.47	1
African Christian Democratic Party	25,542	0.61	1
Federal Party	16,279	0.39	0
Africa Muslim Party	12,888	0.31	0
Women's Rights Peace Party	7,279	0.17	0
Luso-South African Party	5,423	0.13	0
Dikwankwetla Party	4,853	0.12	0
African Democratic Movement	4,352	0.10	0
Ximoko Progressive Party	3,275	0.08	0
Total	4,198,250	100.00	86
Valid votes	4,198,250	99.40	
Invalid/blank votes	25,383	0.60	
Total votes	4,223,633	100.00	
Source: Election Resources

=== KwaZulu/Natal ===
Party	Votes	%	Seats
Inkatha Freedom Party	1,844,070	50.32	41
African National Congress	1,181,118	32.23	26
National Party	410,710	11.21	9
Democratic Party	78,910	2.15	2
Minority Front	48,951	1.34	1
Pan Africanist Congress	26,601	0.73	1
African Christian Democratic Party	24,690	0.67	1
Freedom Front	18,625	0.51	0
Africa Muslim Party	17,931	0.49	0
African Democratic Movement	8,092	0.22	0
Workers International to Rebuild the Fourth International	4,626	0.13	0
Total	3,664,324	100.00	81
Valid votes	3,664,324	98.94	
Invalid/blank votes	39,369	1.06	
Total votes	3,703,693	100.00	
Source: Election Resources

=== Mpumalanga ===
Party	Votes	%	Seats
African National Congress	1,070,052	80.69	25
National Party	119,311	9.00	3
Freedom Front	75,120	5.66	2
Pan Africanist Congress	21,679	1.63	0
Inkatha Freedom Party	20,147	1.52	0
Democratic Party	7,437	0.56	0
African Christian Democratic Party	6,339	0.48	0
African Democratic Movement	5,062	0.38	0
Right Party	921	0.07	0
Total	1,326,068	100.00	30
Valid votes	1,326,068	99.06	
Invalid/blank votes	12,631	0.94	
Total votes	1,338,699	100.00	
Source: Election Resources

=== North-West ===
Party	Votes	%	Seats
African National Congress	1,310,080	83.33	26
National Party	138,986	8.84	3
Freedom Front	72,821	4.63	1
Pan Africanist Congress	27,274	1.73	0
Democratic Party	7,894	0.50	0
Inkatha Freedom Party	5,948	0.38	0
African Christian Democratic Party	5,570	0.35	0
African Democratic Movement	3,569	0.23	0
Total	1,572,142	100.00	30
Valid votes	1,572,142	98.81	
Invalid/blank votes	18,974	1.19	
Total votes	1,591,116	100.00	
Source: Election Resources

=== Northern Cape ===
Party	Votes	%	Seats
African National Congress	200,839	49.74	15
National Party	163,452	40.48	12
Freedom Front	24,117	5.97	2
Democratic Party	7,567	1.87	1
Pan Africanist Congress	3,765	0.93	0
Inkatha Freedom Party	1,688	0.42	0
African Christian Democratic Party	1,610	0.40	0
African Democratic Movement	734	0.18	0
Total	403,772	100.00	30
Valid votes	403,772	99.13	
Invalid/blank votes	3,534	0.87	
Total votes	407,306	100.00	
Source: Election Resources

=== Limpopo ===
Party	Votes	%	Seats
African National Congress	1,759,597	91.63	38
National Party	62,745	3.27	1
Freedom Front	41,193	2.15	1
Pan Africanist Congress	24,360	1.27	0
United People's Front	10,123	0.53	0
African Christian Democratic Party	7,363	0.38	0
Ximoko Progressive Party	4,963	0.26	0
Democratic Party	4,021	0.21	0
African Democratic Movement	3,662	0.19	0
Inkatha Freedom Party	2,233	0.12	0
Total	1,920,260	100.00	40
Valid votes	1,920,260	99.29	
Invalid/blank votes	13,702	0.71	
Total votes	1,933,962	100.00	
Source: Election Resources

=== Western Cape ===
Party	Votes	%	Seats
National Party	1,138,242	53.25	23
African National Congress	705,576	33.01	14
Democratic Party	141,970	6.64	3
Freedom Front	44,003	2.06	1
African Christian Democratic Party	25,731	1.20	1
Pan Africanist Congress	22,676	1.06	0
Africa Muslim Party	20,954	0.98	0
Islamic Party	16,762	0.78	0
Inkatha Freedom Party	7,445	0.35	0
Wes-Kaap Federaliste Party	6,337	0.30	0
South African Women's Party	2,641	0.12	0
Green Party	2,611	0.12	0
African Democratic Movement	1,939	0.09	0
Workers International to Rebuild the Fourth International	855	0.04	0
Total	2,137,742	100.00	42
Valid votes	2,137,742	99.50	
Invalid/blank votes	10,714	0.50	
Total votes	2,148,456	100.00	
Source: Election Resources

== Legacy ==
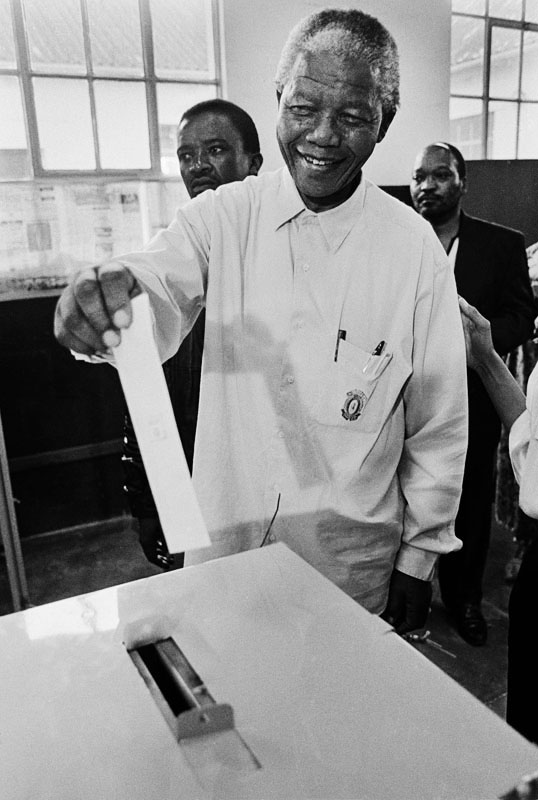
Mandela voting in the 1994 election

Following the elections, 27 April subsequently became a national public holiday, Freedom Day.

In a Sunday Independent article on the 20th anniversary of the election, Steven Friedman, who headed the IEC's information analysis department during the election, stated that the lack of a voters roll made verifying the results of the election difficult, and there were widespread accusations of cheating. Friedman characterised the election as a "technical disaster but a political triumph", and intimated that the final results were as a result of a negotiated compromise, rather than being an accurate count of the votes cast, stating that it was impossible to produce an accurate result under the circumstances that the election was held. He wrote that he believed that the result of the election, which gave KwaZulu-Natal to the IFP; gave the National Party 20% of the vote share, and a Deputy President position; and held the ANC back from the two-thirds majority with the ability to unilaterally write the final constitution, helped prevent a civil war.
