= 1976 Transkei parliamentary election =

Parliamentary elections were held in Transkei on 29 September 1976. The Transkei National Independence Party won 69 of the 75 elected seats.

== Results ==
Party	Votes	%	Seats	+/–
Transkei National Independence Party			69	+44
New Democratic Party			2	New
Democratic Party			1	–9
Independents			1	–7
Vacant			2	–
Appointed members			75	–
Total			150	–
Total votes	372,098	–		
Registered voters/turnout	847,255	43.92		
Source: African Elections Database

== Aftermath ==
By-elections were held to fill the two vacant seats, both won by the Transkei National Independence Party.
