= 1975 QwaQwa legislative election =

Parliamentary elections were held in QwaQwa between 19 and 21 March 1975. The Dikwankwetla Party won 19 of the 20 elected seats.

== Electoral system ==
The Legislative Assembly had a total of 60 seats, 20 of which were elected and 40 of which were reserved for tribal representatives; 26 from the Koena tribe and 14 from the Tlokwa tribe.

== Results ==
Party	Seats
Dikwankwetla Party	19
Basotho Unity Party	1
Appointed members	40
Total	60
Source: African Elections Database
