= 1985 QwaQwa legislative election =

Parliamentary elections were held in QwaQwa in 1985. The result was a victory for the Dikwankwetla Party.
