= Bisho massacre =

1992 CDF massacre in South Africa

- Part of the Internal resistance to apartheid
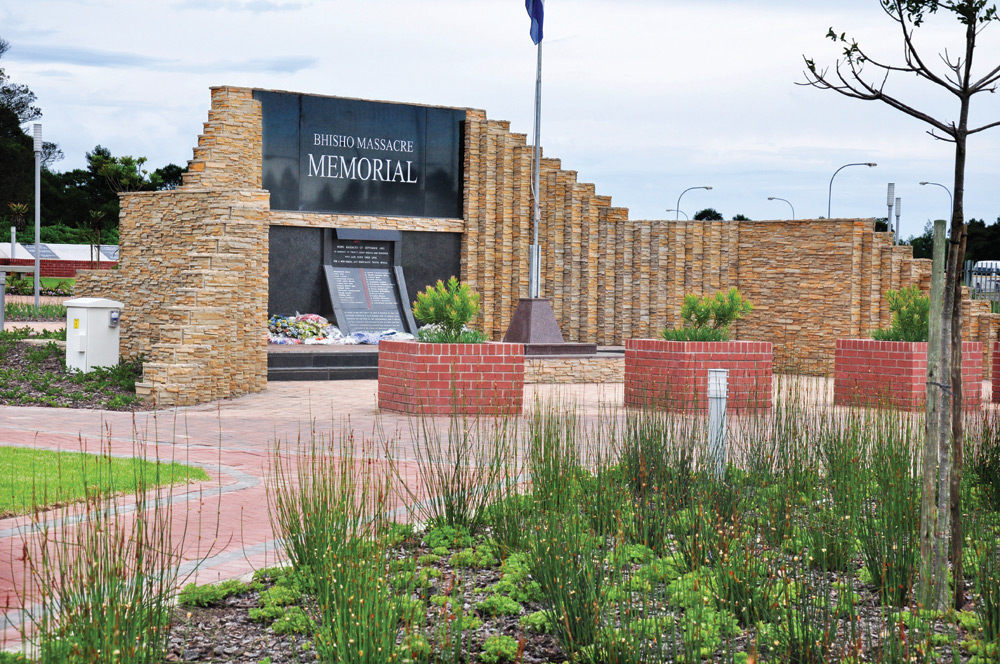
- Bisho massacre memorial site

- Bisho massacre (Eastern Cape)
- Location: 32°51′35″S 27°25′30″E; Bisho, Eastern Cape, South Africa
- Date: 7 September 1992 (34 years ago)
- Deaths: 29 (including 28 ANC supporters, 1 soldier)
- Injuries: 200+
- Perpetrator: Ciskei Defence Force

The Bisho massacre occurred on 7 September 1992 in Bisho, in the then nominally independent homeland of Ciskei which is now part of the Eastern Cape in South Africa. Twenty-eight African National Congress (ANC) supporters and one soldier were shot dead by the Ciskei Defence Force (CDF) during a protest march when they attempted to enter Bisho (now renamed to Bhisho) to demand the reincorporation of Ciskei into South Africa nearly six months after the 1992 South African apartheid referendum was held.

== Background ==
Bhisho (previously spelled Bisho) was the capital of the Ciskei, a nominally independent homeland (bantustan) for the Xhosa people in South Africa. The government of Ciskei was formed in 1961 under the Bantu Authorities Act, 1951 after the South African government declared it a separate administrative territory. In 1972, the status was elevated to self-governing territory. This coincided with stronger efforts to forcibly remove Xhosa-speakers to Ciskei. On 4 December 1982, Ciskei became an independent republic, recognised only by the South African government and other 'independent' homeland states in South Africa. The system of racially segregated homelands had been a core of apartheid, but between 1990 and 1994, negotiations were taking place between the government of South Africa and the African National Congress (ANC) to end the apartheid system.

With multi-racial democratic elections as the likely outcome of the negotiations, the ANC wished to organise and mobilise its supporters in the Ciskei, particularly as it lay in the Eastern Cape area, a traditional stronghold for ANC supporters. However, its military leader Brigadier Oupa Gqozo resisted this and prevented the ANC from organising. In 1991, Gqozo formed the African Democratic Movement to counter the ANC in Ciskei. In December of the same year, he was part of the Convention for a Democratic South Africa (Codesa) negotiations. Codesa was a forum made up of government (National Party) and non-government interest groups to negotiate a new constitution and the transition to democracy in South Africa. In March 1992, Gqozo accused the ANC of planning to overthrow him and in August he stopped ANC marchers from entering Ciskei from King William's Town, a town in South Africa, although close enough to Ciskei.

== Protest march and massacre ==
On 3 September, the ANC sent a memorandum to President F. W. de Klerk demanding that he replace Gqozo with an interim administration which would permit free democratic activity in Ciskei, but De Klerk refused, on the grounds that the Ciskei did not fall under South Africa's jurisdiction. At the time, negotiations had broken down, with the ANC withdrawing following the Boipatong massacre and accusing De Klerk's government of fomenting the violence.

As a result, the ANC began a campaign of "mass action", organising a protest march to occupy Bisho and force Gqozo's resignation. Gqozo sought a court interdict to prevent the march, and the magistrate ruled that it could take place at the homeland's independence stadium, outside Bisho, but could not enter the capital. The ANC refused to recognise the jurisdiction of the Ciskei court.

On 7 September, about 80,000 protesters gathered outside Bisho, signalling the wide opposition to Gqozo's rule. The meeting was led by senior ANC leaders including South African Communist Party Secretary General Chris Hani, Cyril Ramaphosa, Steve Tshwete and Ronnie Kasrils. A razor wire was erected on the border between South Africa and Ciskei to prevent the marchers from entering Bisho. When Kasrils led a group trying to break through the Ciskei Defence Force lines to enter Bisho, Ciskei Defence Force soldiers opened fire on the marchers with automatic weapons, killing 28 marchers and one soldier, and injuring over 200. More than 425 rounds were fired, the first fusillade lasting one and a half minutes, and the second lasting a minute.

Various inquiries agreed that the order to fire came from Colonel Vakele Archibald Mkosana, who incorrectly told his commanders by radio that his troops were under fire, and was given permission to return fire. Rifleman Mzamile Thomas Gonya was also found to have opened fire with a grenade launcher, killing one marcher.

== Goldstone Commission ==
The Goldstone Commission was tasked with investigating the massacre, and Justice Richard Goldstone condemned Gqozo for preventing political activity in Ciskei as well as for the lethal brutality of the Ciskei Defence Force troops. It dismissed his claim that the demonstrators had fired first, and it was later found that a Ciskei soldier who died during the shooting had been shot by a fellow soldier. It recommended strong action against Gqozo and those responsible. It also condemned Ronnie Kasrils for his irresponsible action in leading marchers breaking through the razor wire and provoking the forces into opening fire.

== Aftermath ==
On 8 September 1992, a day after the massacre, the ANC released a statement demanding that Oupa Gqozo be removed as the leader of Ciskei, Section 43 of the Ciskei National Security Act which prevented political activity in Ciskei be revoked and South African Military Intelligence officials be removed from Ciskei. Ultimately, the massacre led to new negotiations between the ANC and the government. Nelson Mandela met De Klerk on 26 September and signed a Record of Understanding, establishing an independent body to oversee police operations.

Gqozo remained in power in Ciskei but resigned shortly before the elections of 27 April 1994.

A granite monument was erected on the site of the massacre, outside Independence Stadium, off Maitland Road between Bhisho and King William's Town. It was unveiled by Archbishop Desmond Tutu in 1997. The victims were buried in Ginsberg township outside King William's Town. Each year during the month of September, the Bisho Massacre Memorial Lecture is held to commemorate the massacre and various leaders from around South Africa take part in it.

== Truth Commission hearing and prosecution ==
Only two applications for amnesty for the massacre were received by the Truth and Reconciliation Commission, from Colonel Mkosana, who gave the order to open fire, and Rifleman Gonya, who fired a grenade launcher. Gqozo agreed to testify before the TRC, but failed to appear after being admitted to a psychiatric hospital suffering from depression.

In 2000, both Mkosana and Gonya were denied amnesty on the grounds that their actions were reckless and disproportionate and not associated with a political motive.

Following their failure to receive amnesty, Mkosana and Gonya were charged with one count of murder and Mkosana with 28 counts of culpable homicide. They were found not guilty on all charges on the grounds of self-defence.

Testifying at a Truth and Reconciliation Commission hearing on the massacre, Gqozo's former deputy, Col Silence Pita, revealed that Gqozo had received a message stating that uMkhonto we Sizwe was planning coup and would take us "where we didn't want to be" but the source of the information had not been made clear in the report. Pita said security arrangements for an African National Congress march on 7 September 1992 were left to the Ciskei Defence Force.

Former Ciskei foreign affairs minister Mickey Webb testified that the Ciskei government had been maneuvered into a confrontation with the ANC by South Africa's intelligence services. He claimed that South African Military Intelligence and Ciskei's own intelligence agency fed the Ciskei government with misinformation "which could only have ended up in confrontation between the authorities and the ANC".

== Victims ==
These are the names of protesters who died on the shooting of Ciskei Defence Force:

#	Name (s)	Surname (s)
1	Thembinkosi	Billie
2	Peter	Booi
3	Sipho	Cologu
4	Mzwamadoda	Dyantyi
5	Vuyani Leslie	Fulani
6	Hambile King	Gadu
7	Mongezi Mosset	Gibe
8	Thobani	Gola
9	Nkululeko	Hlanganyane
10	Xolani	Kaleni
11	Thobile	Kali
12	Sipho	Khundulu
13	Zwelitsha	Lali
14	Mbulelo George	Mangona
15	Siputsu Cameron	Matikinca
16	Vukani Goodman	Mbula
17	Jongile	Mene
18	Monde	Mfene
19	Nkosemntu	Motman
20	Mnyamezeli Nathaniel	Myeha
21	Harold Ndodana	Ndzilane
22	Twelve	Ngamntwini
23	Headmam	Nontshinga
24	Zolile	Noqayi
25	Zamile	Nqwala
26	Nosipho	Ntenyana
27	Luzuko	Ramncwana
28	Zanethemba Benjamin	Skephu

A memorial constructed at the Bhisho Massacre Memorial Site lists the names of the deceased.

== See also ==
- List of massacres in South Africa
