= 1980 QwaQwa legislative election =

Parliamentary elections were held in QwaQwa between 19 and 21 April 1980. The Dikwankwetla Party won all 20 of the elected seats.

== Electoral system ==
The Legislative Assembly had a total of 60 seats, 20 of which were elected and 40 of which were reserved for tribal representatives; 26 from the Koena tribe and 14 from the Tlokwa tribe.

== Results ==
Party	Seats	+/–
Dikwankwetla Party	20	+1
Appointed members	40	0
Total	60	0
Source: African Elections Database
