= 1968 Transkei legislative election =

Parliamentary elections held in the Transkei Bantustan, South Africa

Parliamentary elections were held in the Transkei Bantustan, South Africa on 23 October 1968. The Transkei National Independence Party won 57 of the 75 elected seats.

== Electoral system ==
The Legislative Assembly had a total of 109 seats, 45 of which were elected and 64 of which were reserved for directly and indirectly elected chiefs. Of the 64 seats reserved for chiefs, four were for Paramount chiefs and 60 for office-holding Chiefs in nine regions. 56 of the 64 Chiefs supported the ruling party.

== Results ==
Party	Votes	%	Seats			
Party	Votes	%	Elected	Chiefs	Total	+/–
Transkei National Independence Party			28	56	84	+13
Democratic Party			14	8	22	–13
Other parties and independents			3	0	3	0
Total			45	64	109	0
Total votes	451,916	–				
Registered voters/turnout	907,778	49.78				
Source: African Elections Database
