= 1981 Transkei parliamentary election =

Parliamentary elections were held in Transkei on 24 September 1981. The Transkei National Independence Party won 74 of the 75 elected seats.

== Results ==
Party	Seats	+/–
Transkei National Independence Party	74	+5
Democratic Progressive Party	1	New
Appointed members	75	0
Total	150	0
Source: African Elections Database

== Aftermath ==
By-elections were held to fill the two vacant seats, both won by the Transkei National Independence Party.
