= 1963 Transkei legislative election =

Parliamentary elections were held in Transkei on 20 November 1963. Although the Democratic Party won a majority of the elected seats, the Transkei National Independence Party emerged as the largest party in the Legislative Assembly after the appointment of a further 64 members.

The assembly met for the first time on 6 December 1963 in Umtata, and elected Chief Kaiser Matanzima as Chief Minister over Chief Victor Poto. Matanzima received 54 votes, and Poto 49, with 2 papers being spoilt. Following the vote Matanzima formed the Transkei National Independence Party from his supporters – largely non-elected chiefs and their supporters. Poto and the majority of elected members of the assembly formed the opposition in response.

== Electoral system ==
The Legislative Assembly had a total of 109 seats, 45 of which were elected and 64 of which were reserved for directly and indirectly elected chiefs.

== Results ==
Party	Votes	%	Seats		
Party	Votes	%	Elected	Chiefs	Total
Democratic Party			27	8	35
Transkei National Independence Party			15	56	71
Other parties and independents			3	0	3
Total			45	64	109
Total votes	601,204	–			
Registered voters/turnout	880,425	68.29			
Source: African Elections Database
