= 1973 Transkei legislative election =

Parliamentary elections were held in Transkei on 24 October 1973. The Transkei National Independence Party won 25 of the 40 elected seats.

== Results ==
Party	Votes	%	Seats
Transkei National Independence Party			25
Democratic Party			10
Independents			8
Vacant			2
Total			45
Total votes	323,092	–	
Registered voters/turnout	952,369	33.93	
Source: African Elections Database

== Aftermath ==
By-elections were held for the two vacant seats in 1974, both of which were won by the Transkei National Independence Party.
