= Democratic Progressive Party (Transkei) =

Former political party in South Africa

The Democratic Progressive Party was a political party in the South African bantustan of Transkei. The party condemned apartheid rule. In the 1981 elections, the party won one out of 75 seats. In the 1986 elections it won two seats.
