= 1990 QwaQwa legislative election =

Parliamentary elections were held in QwaQwa in 1990. The result was a victory for the Dikwankwetla Party.
