= Flag of Ciskei =

- Proportion: 2:3
- Adopted: 22 June 1977

The flag of Ciskei consisted of a white diagonal stripe running from the upper-right corner to the lower-left corner, with a blue crane (known as Indwe in the Xhosa language) in the center, on a sky blue background.

The Ciskei flag was officially taken into use on 22 June 1977 when the area became a "self-governing territory" although it had in fact first been hoisted outside the Legislative Assembly building on 15 March 1974. The flag remained unchanged at independence and continued to be used until 27 April 1994 when Ciskei was re-incorporated into South Africa.

The blue in the flag is said to symbolise the infinity of the sky and the striving for progress and development. The white bar referred to the path which must be followed in order to bring this development to fruition. The blue crane symbolises the desire of the Xhosa people to be courageous and steadfast and to labour with diligence for the future of the country and its people.
