= 1986 Transkei parliamentary election =

Parliamentary elections were held in Transkei in September 1986. The Transkei National Independence Party won 57 of the 75 elected seats.

== Results ==
Party	Seats	+/–
Transkei National Independence Party	57	–17
Democratic Progressive Party	2	+1
Independents	16	+16
Appointed members	75	0
Total	150	0
Source: African Elections Database
