= 1973 Ciskei legislative election =

Parliamentary elections were held in Ciskei between 19 and 23 February 1973. As there were no political parties at the time, all candidates ran as independents.

== Electoral system ==
The Legislative Assembly had a total of 50 seats, 20 of which were elected and 30 of which were reserved for appointed chiefs. The country was divided into nine districts for the election.

== Results ==
Party	Seats
Independents	20
Appointed chiefs	30
Total	50
Source: African Elections Database

== Aftermath ==
In June 1975, the High Court annulled the election of four members, including Chief Minister Lennox Sebe due to election irregularities in Zwelitsha, making Sebe ineligible to hold the post of Chief Minister. He was subsequently re-elected in a by-election on 24 October 1975 and reassumed office.
