= 1973 Lebowan legislative election =

Parliamentary elections were held in Lebowa on 11 April 1973.

== Electoral system ==
The election was made on the basis of 40 seats. In addition, there were 60 ex officio seats.
