= Ciskei National Independence Party =

African political party

Ciskei National Independence Party iQela leSizwe leNkululeko yeCiskei.
- Leader: Lennox Sebe
- Founder: Lennox Sebe
- Founded: February 19, 1973
- Dissolved: March 4, 1990
- Ideology: Xhosa nationalism; Anti-communism; Totalitarianism; Economic libertarianism; Neoliberalism; Pro-apartheid
- Political position: Right-wing to far-right
- National affiliation: National Party (South Africa)

Party flag

The Ciskei National Independence Party (CNIP) was a political party in the nominally independent South African homeland of Ciskei. It was founded and led by Lennox Sebe.

The party advocated cooperation with the South African government. The party governed Ciskei from the 1973 legislative election until the 1990 coup d'état by Oupa Gqozo.

== Electoral history ==
- 1978: CNIP won all 50 elected seats (a further 87 seats were filled by chiefs appointed ex-officio by the government)
- 1984: CNIP was deemed to won the election unopposed, as its 23 candidates were the only ones to register
