= 1983 Gazankulu legislative election =

Parliamentary elections were held in Gazankulu on 7 September 1983.
