= 1909 Natal Union of South Africa membership referendum =

1909 referendum in the Colony of Natal

- 10 June 1909

Results
Choice	Votes	%
Yes	11,121	75.03%
No	3,701	24.97%
Valid votes	14,822	100.00%
Invalid or blank votes	0	0.00%
Total votes	14,822	100.00%
Registered voters/turnout	25,463	58.21%

A referendum on joining the Union of South Africa was held in the Colony of Natal on 10 June 1909. It was approved by 75% of voters, and Natal became part of the Union when it was established on 31 May 1910.

== Results ==
Choice	Votes	%
For	11,121	75.03
Against	3,701	24.97
Invalid/blank votes		–
Total		100
Registered voters/turnout	25,463	
Source: African Elections Database
