= 1973 Gazankulu legislative election =

Parliamentary elections were held in Gazankulu on 17 October 1973.

== Electoral system ==
The election was made on the basis of 26 seats. In addition, there were 42 ex-officio seats.
