= 1983 Lebowan legislative election =

Parliamentary elections were held in Lebowa on 16 March 1983. The Lebowa People’s Party won more than 75% of the 40 elected seats in the Legislative Assembly.

== Electoral system ==
The Lebowa Legislative Assembly consisted of 100 seats, only 40 of which were elected.
