= Charles Sebe =

Xhanti Charles Sebe
- Died: 27/28 January 1991; Ciskei
- Known for: Ciskei state security head and rebel
- Relatives: Lennox Sebe (brother)

Lt. General Xhanti Charles Sebe was leader of the Ciskei Defence Force- the military of the Bantustan of Ciskei, and its Director of State Security. A former Security Branch policeman, he later joined the South African Bureau of State Security (B.O.S.S.) before founding the Ciskei state security apparatus. Described as having created a police state in Ciskei, and being perceived as its de facto ruler, he is the young brother of Lennox Sebe. He was subsequently arrested by his brother's government, and sentenced to prison by the Ciskei government for incitement, but was rescued from jail by white mercenaries, and escaped to the nearby Bantustan of Transkei, where he began an organisation that aimed to overthrow his brother's government.

Sebe was lured, with Onward Guzana, back to Ciskei in an operation orchestrated by South African security forces in 1991 27/28 January, during the rule of Oupa Gqozo, and, having been wounded in an ambush which killed an associate, was the subject of a manhunt, and he was subsequently shot to death by the Ciskei Security forces. Gqozo was tried in 1993 for murder by the Ciskei Supreme Court and, with codefendant Sergeant-Major Thozamile Veliti, was acquitted.

Sebe's killing was later investigated by South Africa's Truth and Reconciliation Commission.
