= 1978 Gazankulu legislative election =

Parliamentary elections were held in Gazankulu on 13 September 1978.
