= Transitional Executive Council =

- Multiparty Body of the Republic of South Africa
- 1993–1994
- Coat of arms of South Africa
- Date formed: 7 December 1993
- Date dissolved: 10 May 1994 (5 months and 3 days)

People and organisations
- State President: Frederik de Klerk
- No. of ministers: 19 ministers
- Member parties: 19 political groups

History
- Incoming formation: Negotiations to end apartheid
- Outgoing formation: 1994 election
- Predecessor: De Klerk Cabinet
- Successor: Mandela Cabinet

The Transitional Executive Council (TEC) was a multiparty body in South Africa that was established by law to facilitate the transition to democracy, in the lead-up to the country's first non-racial election in April 1994.

As part of the multi-party negotiations that ended apartheid, the African National Congress (ANC) pushed for the creation of a body that would ensure a level playing field, arguing that the governing National Party would not be impartial, as it would also be contesting the election.

The TEC was created by the Transitional Executive Council Act, 1993, and consisted of one member of each of the parties that participated in the negotiations, with the notable exceptions of the Pan Africanist Congress (PAC) and the Freedom Alliance, an alliance of right-wing and black groups such as the Inkatha Freedom Party who had abandoned the negotiation process.

The TEC consisted of 19 people, one each from the 19 political groups that participated in the negotiations, and it had a number of subcouncils. These subcouncils were focused on particular areas, such as stability and security, intelligence, and law and order, with members appointed because of specific expertise, and they received instructions from the TEC. TEC subcouncils had the power to curtail government actions, to access information relevant to their purposes, and to review and reject legislation passed by the Tricameral Parliament of South Africa and the Bantustans if it deemed that these laws would hamper the attainment of democratic elections.

Although State President Frederik de Klerk downplayed the TEC's role after its first sitting on 7 December 1993, Cyril Ramaphosa, who represented the ANC on the body, said that it marked the end of minority rule in South Africa. The TEC was the first time that black South Africans played a major role in the governance of the country, and one of its actions was the dismissal of the Ciskei government after its collapse in March 1994 and the appointment of two administrators for the territory. Together with the South African government, it also took control of Boputhatswana after the government of Lucas Mangope refused to give assurances that it would permit free and fair elections in the territory.
