= 1978 Lebowan legislative election =

Parliamentary elections were held in Lebowa on 15 March 1978 and for two districts (Morerong, Sekhukhune) later, on 12 July 1978.
