= Oupa Gqozo =

South African politician (born 1952)

Brigadier general Oupa Gqozo

2nd Head of State of Ciskei
- In office 4 March 1990 – 22 March 1994
- Preceded by: Lennox Sebe
- Succeeded by: Pieter van Rensburg Goosen and Bongani Blessing Finca (TEC Administrators)

Personal details
- Born: Joshua Oupa Gqozo; 10 March 1952 (age 74) Kroonstad, Orange Free State, South Africa
- Party: None (Military)
- Other political affiliations: African Democratic Movement (from 1991)
- Spouse: Corinthian Nomziwakhe
- Awards: Order of Good Hope

Joshua Oupa Gqozo (Xhosa pronunciation: [ɔupʼa ᶢǃʱɔz̤ɔ]; born 10 March 1952) was the military ruler of the former homeland of Ciskei in South Africa.

== Early life ==
Gqozo was born in Kroonstad, Orange Free State on 10 March 1952, the son of a Christian minister.

In Afrikaans, Oupa means "Grandfather".

Gqozo was sent away at a young age to stay with a relative living in Witgatboom in Northern Transvaal (now Limpopo). There he completed his primary education at Seabe Community School. Gqozo returned to Kroonstad where he attended the Phomolong Junior and Bodibeng Senior High School. He dropped out of school in 1972 and went to work as a prison officer at Kroonstad prison. He later matriculated through correspondence in 1975.

== Military career ==
The Prisons Department sent Gqozo to study at the Baviaanspoort Training College and upon completion he worked at Klerksdorp prison. He joined the South African Defence Force (SADF) and worked as a soldier and chief clerk of 21 Battalion based in Lenasia, Johannesburg.

== Ciskei ==
The Ciskei Defence Force (CDF) was established during March 1981 from 141 Battalion of the SADF as part of 21 Battalion. Gqozo was moved from the SADF to the CDF as part of the officer corps. On 4 December 1981, Ciskei was granted independence from South Africa and became a Bantustan with Lennox Sebe as president.

In 1983, Sebe's brother, Lieutenant General Charles Sebe, head of Ciskei's intelligence service, attempted a coup. He was arrested but later in 1986 he escaped from prison and made his way to nearby Transkei. Charles, in 1987, orchestrated the kidnapping of Lennox Sebe's son Kwame.

During this time, Colonel Oupa Gqozo was sent to Pretoria as military attaché. He became a brigadier on 1 April 1988. Brigadier Gqozo returned to Ciskei as Chief of Staff Intelligence during December 1989. In January 1990, Gqozo completed his term of duty and was honoured with the Order of Good Hope.

=== Coup and rule ===
On 4 March 1990, Gqozo staged his own coup in Ciskei in the absence of Lennox Sebe who was on state visit to Hong Kong. Kwame Sebe was also planning to stage a coup, but failed to get it off the ground and was kept in military custody together with other government officials. In November of the same year, another coup planned by Colonel Guzana and former military council member Major Peter Howsa was stopped. Again in February 1991, another coup was attempted, this time by the head of Ciskei's Defence Force, Brigadier Aaron Jamangile.

In mid-1991, Gqozo formed the African Democratic Movement to counter the influence of the African National Congress in the region. In December of that year, he formed part of the delegation at the Convention for a Democratic South Africa (CODESA) to discuss South Africa's new political dispensation. In March 1992, Gqozo accused the African National Congress of planning to remove him from power in Ciskei.

=== Bisho massacre ===
During 1992, Gqozo's resistance to the African National Congress came to a head. On 7 September 1992, the ANC organised a march to enter Bisho and force Gqozo from power. A march of about 80,000 people led by South African Communist Party General Secretary Chris Hani, Cyril Ramaphosa, and Harry Gwala took place on 7 September 1992. When Ronnie Kasrils led a group in trying to break through the Ciskei Defence Force lines to enter Bisho stadium, the soldiers opened fire on marchers, killing 28 people and injuring over 200.

On 13 December 1993, the Ciskei Supreme Court acquitted Gqozo and Sergeant-Major Thozamile Veliti of the murder of Charles Sebe.

=== Resignation as leader of Ciskei ===
On 22 March 1994, Gqozo contacted the South African Foreign Minister Pik Botha and resigned as leader of Ciskei. The Transitional Executive Council appointed two administrators to govern Ciskei until the first democratic elections.

Following the first post-apartheid elections in South Africa, Ciskei and all of the other homelands were reincorporated into it on 27 April 1994.

== Post-Ciskei ==
In 1996, before he could appear before the Truth and Reconciliation Commission for the Bisho massacre in 1992, he was admitted to a psychiatric ward after suffering from depression. In 1998 he was convicted and fined R10,000 for illicit diamond trafficking.

Judge Willem Heath conducted a probe into Ciskei government land deals.

In 2001, Gqozo sustained bullet wounds to his head and back while trying to protect traditional healer Keke "Gonondo" Mama in Middledrift. Mama died in hospital after the shooting. It was believed that Gqozo was Mama's bodyguard, a job that he started after his finances took a nosedive.

He was hospitalised again after burning his hands and face. This time, he had mistakenly refilled a heater with petrol instead of paraffin which burst into flames. The fire caused an estimated R60,000 damage to his farmhouse, outside King William's Town.

Gqozo is married to Corinthian Nomziwakhe and they have four children. In 2015, he had moved from his dilapidated farmhouse near King William's Town to Kroonstad in the Free State.

Political offices
Preceded by Lennox Sebe as President	Head of State of Ciskei; Chairman of the Military Committee and of the Council of State; 1990–1994	Succeeded by Pieter van Rensburg Goosen and Bongani Blessing Finca as TEC Administrators
