= Lennox Sebe =

Chief minister and first president of Ciskei (1926–1994)

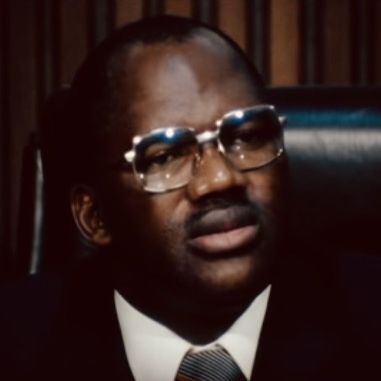

1st President of Ciskei
- In office 4 December 1981 – 4 March 1990
- Preceded by: Position established
- Succeeded by: Oupa Gqozo (Chairman of the Military Committee and of the Council of State)

2nd Chief Minister of Ciskei
- In office 21 May 1973 – July 1975
- Preceded by: Justice Mabandla
- Succeeded by: Charles Sebe
- In office 24 October 1975 – 4 December 1981
- Preceded by: Charles Sebe
- Succeeded by: Position abolished

Personal details
- Born: Lennox Wongama Sebe; 26 July 1926 Belstone, Cape, South Africa
- Died: 23 July 1994 (aged 67) South Africa
- Party: Ciskei National Independence Party
- Parent: Charles Sebe (brother)

Lennox Leslie Wongama Ngweyesizwe Sebe (26 July 1926 – 23 July 1994) was the chief minister of the Xhosa bantustan of Ciskei after its self-rule in 1972, and the nominally independent country's first president from 1983. He was the Chief of the AmaKhambashe Tribal Authority and his praise name (isikhahlelo) was Ngweyesizwe.

== Early life ==
Born in Belstone, near King William's Town and he is brother of Charles Sebe, Sebe worked first as a school teacher before being appointed as a school principal in 1954. In 1968, Sebe was elected as a representative of the Xhosa Kingdom's AmaNtinde chieftaincy in the Ciskeian Territorial Authority and became responsible for Educational and Cultural Affairs, before transferring to the Agriculture portfolio in 1971.

== Rise to power ==
Sebe founded the Ciskei National Independence Party and contested Ciskei's inaugural election in February 1973. He was elected to the Zwelitsha electorate and succeeded Chief Justice Mabandla to become the second Chief Minister of Ciskei on 21 May 1973. He would then become president when Ciskei was granted nominal independence from South Africa on 4 December 1981. Sebe declared himself President for Life in 1983.

Sebe was faced with leading an economically unviable state, with a population of one million, many of them Xhosa forced to relocate to the bantustan in the 1970s, during South Africa's apartheid regime.

== Dictatorship ==
Immediately upon independence, Sebe consolidated power in a dictatorship, supported by the 1,000-strong military force. He crushed all opposition, including bitter protests against a transit fare strike in 1983 (most residents worked outside the bantustan, and relied on public transportation to get them to work). That same year, Sebe's brother, Lieutenant General Charles Sebe, head of Ciskei's intelligence service, attempted to overthrow the government. Though Charles Sebe was arrested, he escaped from prison in 1986 and made his way to nearby Transkei, where he continued to agitate against the regime. In 1987, he orchestrated the kidnapping of Sebe's son Khwane, who was held prisoner in Transkei until Sebe agreed to release political prisoners in exchange for his son.

Sebe visited Israel on several occasions during his presidency and established a trade office in Tel Aviv that was run by two Israelis with ties to the Gush Emunim Israeli settler movement. During this period, the Ciskeian capital, Bisho, signed a sister-city agreement with the settlement community of Ariel in the West Bank. Sebe once claimed that Israel had granted official recognition to Ciskei, although the Israeli Foreign Ministry denied this.

== Collapse ==
Sebe was overthrown by a military coup led by Brigadier General Oupa Gqozo on 4 March 1990 while on state visit to Hong Kong and charged with corruption and human rights violations. He died in 1994 after the reintegration to Ciskei in South Africa.

== Sources ==
- Polakow-Suransky, S. (2010) The Unspoken Alliance: Israel's Secret Relationship with Apartheid South Africa, Pantheon Books: New York. ISBN 9780375425462.
