= 1980 Ciskei independence referendum =

- 4 December 1980
- Should the Ciskei become independent?

Results
Choice	Votes	%
Yes	295,891	99.45%
No	1,642	0.55%
Valid votes	297,533	99.27%
Invalid or blank votes	2,198	0.73%
Total votes	299,731	100.00%
Registered voters/turnout	503,000	59.59%

An independence referendum was held in the South African Bantustan of Ciskei on 4 December 1980. Over 99% of voters voted in favour, and Ciskei was declared independent in 1981 after the Status of Ciskei Act, 1981 was passed by the South African government. The results of the referendum were announced on 17 December.

== Results ==
Choice	Votes	%
For	295,891	99.45
Against	1,642	0.55
Invalid/blank votes	2,198	–
Total	299,731	100
Registered voters/turnout	~504,000	~60
Source:African Elections Database
