= Bongani Blessing Finca =

South African Presbyterian Minister

The Reverend Bongani Blessing Finca
- Minister of the Uniting Presbyterian Church in Southern Africa
- Church: Uniting Presbyterian Church in Southern Africa
- Other post: Administrator to the Republic of Ciskei

Orders
- Ordination: 1975 (minister)

Personal details
- Born: Bongani Blessing Finca; 1953 (age 72–73) South Africa
- Spouse: Naniswa
- Education: Federal Theological Seminary of Southern Africa

Bongani Blessing Finca (born 1953) is a South African Presbyterian minister of the Uniting Presbyterian Church in Southern Africa (UPCSA).

== Biography ==
Bongani Blessing Finca was born on 5 July 1953 and he grew up at the manse at Impendle where his grandfather, TP Finca was the minister. He was studying at Pholela Institute, under the leadership of the Rev Ian Moir of the Church of Scotland, when he accepted the vocation to serve in the ministry. In 1972 he enrolled for training at the Federal Theological Seminary in Alice where he graduated with a degree in theology.

In 1975 he was appointed to Somerville Mission, a congregation of the Bantu Presbyterian Church in Southern Africa in Tsolo and was ordained in the same year. In 1975 he was married to Naniswa and they have three daughters. In 1976 he was appointed Clerk to the Presbytery of Umtata in the Bantu Presbyterian Church in Southern Africa and he began to serve in the Business Committee which was the executive commission of the denomination. In 1979 he studied International Politics at the Selly Oak College in Birmingham in England, and in 1980 he worked as an international exchange student at the headquarters of the Church of Scotland where he was attached to the Department of Stewardship & Finance. He returned home and served the General Assembly in several Committees and Commissions.

The General Assembly of the Reformed Presbyterian Church in Southern Africa appointed him to be the General Manager of the Lovedale Press in 1985, and he served in this position until 1994. He also served in the Governing Councils of the Federal Theological Seminary, the University of Fort Hare, the Border Technikon, and the Walter Sisulu University. He was elected the Moderator of the General Assembly of the Reformed Presbyterian Church in Southern Africa in 1989 and he was elected for a second the second term in 1991. When the Rev SB Ngcobo, who was the General Secretary, passed on unexpectedly, he was appointed to serve as Interim General Secretary from 1993 to 1995.

He was selected by Nelson Mandela to serve as the Administrator of the Ciskei Homeland in 1993 and he was entrusted with the responsibility of reincorporating the Ciskei back into South Africa in 1994. In 1995, Mandela also appointed him to serve as a Commissioner in the Truth & Reconciliation Commission of South Africa. In 1998, he accepted an invitation to set up the office of the Independent Electoral Commission in the Eastern Cape and in 2011 he served as a National Commissioner until the end of his term in 2018. In recognition of his service to the nation, the University of Maryland & Eastern Shore in the United States, awarded him an honorary doctoral degree in 1999.

The Presbytery of Amathole appointed him to be a minister at St George's Presbyterian Church in East London in 2018. He served this congregation until he retired in 2023.
