= Zwelitsha =

- Location within Eastern Cape Location within South Africa
- Coordinates: 32°55′S 27°25′E
- Country: South Africa
- Province: Eastern Cape
- Municipality: Buffalo City

Area
  - Total: 4.64 km^{2} (1.79 sq mi)

Population (2011)
  - Total: 18,189
  - Density: 3,920/km^{2} (10,200/sq mi)

Racial makeup (2011)
  - Black African: 99.2%
  - Coloured: 0.3%
  - Indian/Asian: 0.2%
  - White: 0.1%
  - Other: 0.1%

First languages (2011)
  - Xhosa: 93.2%
  - English: 3.5%
  - Sign language: 1.1%
  - Other: 2.2%
- Time zone: UTC+2 (SAST)
- PO box: 5608
- Area code: 040

Zwelitsha is a town in the Eastern Cape Province of South Africa. It forms part of the Buffalo City Metropolitan Municipality.

== History ==
Zwelitsha was created in 1947 as corridor township to King William's Town to provide labour for the Good Hope Textile Factory of the Da Gama Group, South Africa. As a vestige of the liberal United Party government it had "middle class" pretensions in terms of neat schools, clinics, shopping centers, dairy, inhouse plumbing, bathrooms and toilets. With the entrenchment of apartheid by the early 1960s Zones 6-10 were added to the original Zones 1 to 5.

From 1972 to 1981 it served as the provisional capital of the Bantustan of Ciskei, until the capital could be moved to Alice, and then to Bhisho. Also in 1972 it became the insurgent center of the Black Consciousness Movement (BCM) with the Mapetla Mohapi and Mongezi Sefika wa Nkomo starting a workstudy/political circle in Zone 10 area to launch later in January 1973, the Black People's Convention (BPC), King William's Town, Branch with Zwelitsha as the HQ. BCM activists and leaders including Steve Biko, Harry Ranwedzi Nengekhulu, Welile Nhlapho paid visit in early that including the launching of the National Youth Organization (NAYO) a Black Consciousness youth wing at nearby Mount Coke Hotel.
