= Ciskei =

Bantustan in South Africa (1972–1994)

Coordinates: 32.85°S 27.44°E

Republic of Ciskei iRiphabliki yeCiskei
- 1981–1994
- Flag Coat of arms
- Motto: "Siyakunqandwa Ziinkwenkwezi" (Xhosa) "We Shall be Stopped by the Stars" or "The Sky is the Limit"
- Anthem: Nkosi Sikelel' iAfrika; Xhosa: God Bless Africa
- Location of Ciskei (red) within South Africa (yellow)
- Status: Bantustan (de facto) puppet state of Apartheid South Africa
- Capital: Bisho
- Official languages: Xhosa; English
- Leader
  - 1972–1973: Chief J. T. Mabandla
  - 1973–1978^{a}: Lennox Leslie Wongamu Sebe
  - 1978–1990^{b}: Lennox Leslie Wongamu Sebe
  - 1990–1994: Brigadier General Oupa Gqozo
  - 1994: Pieter van Rensburg Goosen and Bongani Blessing Finca (as TEC Administrators)
- History
  - Self-government: 1 August 1972
  - Nominal independence: 4 December 1981
  - Coup d'etat: 4 March 1990
  - Failed coup d'état: 10 February 1991
  - Re-integrated into South Africa: 27 April 1994

Area
- 1980: 9,000 km^{2} (3,500 sq mi)

Population
  - 1980: 677,920
- Currency: South African rand
Preceded by	Succeeded by
Republic of South Africa (1961–1984)	South Africa
- Today part of: South Africa
- 1. Parliamentary democracy.; 2. One-party state.

Ciskei (/səsˈkaɪ, sɪs-, -ˈkeɪ/ səss-KY, siss-, -KAY, meaning on this side of [the river] Kei), officially the Republic of Ciskei (Xhosa: iRiphabliki yeCiskei), was a Bantustan for the Xhosa people, located in the southeast of South Africa. It covered an area of 7,700 square kilometres (3,000 sq mi), almost entirely surrounded by what was then the Cape Province, and possessed a small coastline along the shore of the Indian Ocean.

Under South Africa's policy of apartheid, land was set aside for black peoples in self-governing territories. Ciskei was designated as one of two homelands, or "Bantustans", for Xhosa-speaking people.

Xhosa people were forcibly resettled in the Ciskei and Transkei, the other Xhosa homeland.

In contrast to the Transkei, which was largely contiguous and deeply rural, and governed by hereditary chiefs, the area that became the Ciskei had initially been made up of a patchwork of "reserves", interspersed with pockets of white-owned farms. In Ciskei, there were elected headmen and a relatively educated working-class populace, but there was a tendency of the region's black residents—who often worked in East London, Queenstown, and King Williams Town—to oppose traditional methods of control. These differences have been posited as the reason for two separate homelands for the Xhosa people being developed, as well as the later nominal independence of Ciskei from South Africa, than Transkei.

After its creation, large numbers of blacks, in particular, "non-productive Bantus"—women with dependent children, the elderly, and the infirm—were expelled by the apartheid government from designated white areas in the Cape Province to Ciskei, and it was also treated as a reservoir of cheap black labour. The diaspora of the Ciskei Xhosa was due to the settler colonialism and internal wars between the Xhosa.

Ciskei had a succession of capitals during its existence. Originally, Zwelitsha served as the capital, with the view that Alice would become the long-term national capital. However, it was Bisho (now spelled Bhisho) that became the capital until Ciskei's reintegration into South Africa.

== History ==
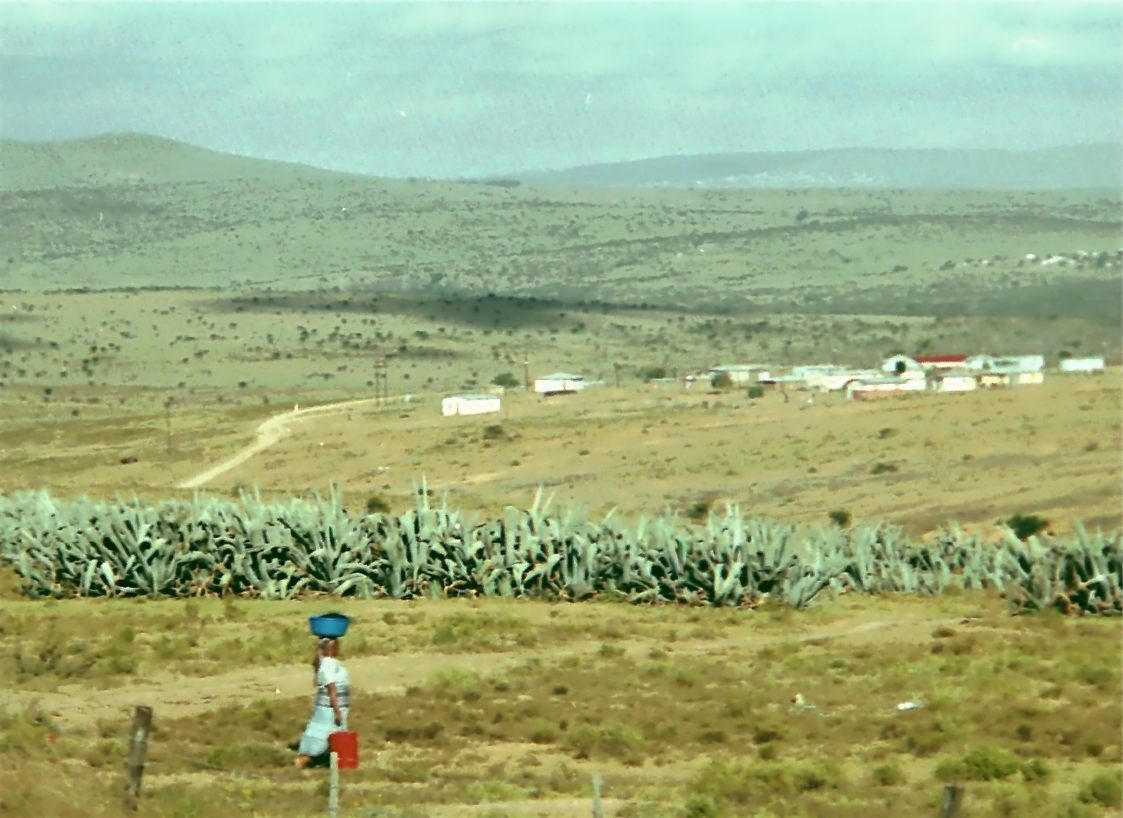
A Xhosa village in Ciskei

Map of Ciskei

By the time Sir John Cradock was appointed governor of the Cape Colony in 1811, the Zuurveld region had lapsed into disorder, and many white farmers had begun abandoning their farms. Early during 1812, on the instructions of the governor, Lieutenant-Colonel John Graham forced 20,000 Xhosa to cross the Fish River. Subsequently, 27 military posts were erected across this border, which resulted in the establishment of the garrison towns of Grahamstown and Cradock.

At the end of the 19th century, the area known as British Kaffraria between the Fish and Kei rivers had been set aside for the "Bantu", and was known as the Ciskei from then on. Europeans gave the name Ciskei to the area to distinguish it from the Transkei, the area north of the Kei.

After the Union of South Africa formed in 1910, the "Bantu" rights of occupation remained unclear, and differed from colony to colony within South Africa. The Native Lands Act of 1913 demarcated the reserves in the Union, and made it illegal to sell or lease these lands to Europeans (except in the Cape Colony). General Hertzog pursued his segregation policy, and subsequently passed the Native Trust and Land Act in 1936. This act effectively abolished the right of the Cape "Bantu" to buy land outside of the existing reserves.

The boundaries of the Ciskei region changed as land was added and excised. A notable excision was the removal of the Glen Grey and Herschel Districts, and their allocation to the newly independent Transkei, with the populations of the districts moving into the rest of Ciskei to retain their South African citizenship (which was subsequently lost when Ciskei became independent).

By the 1970s, the South African government decided on the final boundaries of Ciskei, as a consolidated area, through the amalgamation of existing reserves allocated to Ciskei, and the purchase of intervening white-owned land. This amalgamation reduced the total length of Ciskei's borders, making them easier for the South African government to police, as well being an attempt to create a more viable area for the homeland.

== Independence ==
In 1961, Ciskei became a separate administrative region, and in 1972, was declared self-governing under the rule of Chief Justice Mabandla, who was then followed by Lennox Sebe. Mabandla was a Fengu, a group that had allied itself with the British in the frontier wars, and were better educated as a result of historically embracing colonial education. Further embittered by the policies of "retribalisation" by the apartheid authorities, the Rharhabe became resentful, and asserted their position, which culminated in the election of Sebe—although Sebe later abandoned his anti-Fengu rhetoric.

In 1978, it became a single-party state under the rule of Sebe. In 1981, following an independence referendum in 1980, it became the fourth homeland to be declared independent by the South African government, and its residents lost their South African citizenship. However, there were no border controls between South Africa and Ciskei.

Black people who were found to be living without permits in white areas or farms in South Africa, often for generations, were forcibly relocated to Ciskei by apartheid authorities, generally from "black spots" in the neighbouring "white corridor", and moved into squalid resettlement camps. A 1983 study by Rhodes University found that 40% of the children in one camp suffered from wasting caused by malnutrition, and 10% suffered from kwashiorkor. In another camp at Thornhill, 50% of the children died before the age of 5. Typhoid epidemics also broke out in the resettlement camps, which were often isolated, located far from urban areas, and lacked health facilities, sanitation, and schools. The forced relocations of blacks to the Ciskei resulted in high population densities in the homeland, a situation that persists to the present day.

On several occasions, the Ciskei government imposed collective punishment on communities that opposed its rule, and people fled the Bantustan back into South Africa proper, because of the harassment and denial of government services to dissenters.

In common with other Bantustans, its independence was not recognised by the international community. Sebe once claimed that the State of Israel had granted official recognition to Ciskei, but the Israeli Foreign Ministry denied this.

=== Ciskei–Transkei hostilities and Operation Katzen ===
Ciskei–Transkei conflict
Date	1986–1987
Location	Ciskei & Transkei
Result	Clashes ended

Belligerents
Ciskei	Transkei; Ciskei dissidents

Commanders and leaders
(Ciskei) Lennox Sebe	(Transkei) George Matanzima; (Ciskei) Charles Sebe

In 1986 and 1987, Transkei, a larger, wealthier, and more populous entity, undertook a series of military raids on Ciskei, and attempted to seize control of Ciskei. One of these raids was an attack on leader Lennox Sebe's compound, with the apparent goal of taking him hostage, in order to force a merger of the two Bantustans. Transkei had previously granted sanctuary to Lennox Sebe's estranged brother, Charles, the former head of Ciskei's security forces, who had been imprisoned in Ciskei on charges of sedition, in addition to previously kidnapping Lennox Sebe's son. The South African government ostensibly intervened to warn the Transkei government off. However, during a later meeting of the Truth and Reconciliation Commission, it was revealed that the plan to amalgamate the Transkei and Ciskei into a proposed Xhosaland, as well as the freeing of Charles Sebe from prison, had been carried out by South African security forces linked to the Civil Cooperation Bureau, in order to consolidate an anti-ANC front in the Eastern Cape region, as part of the abortive Operation Katzen.

== Coup d'état ==
In 1990, Brigadier Oupa Gqozo deposed Sebe and ruled as a dictator—despite an initial promise of a swift return to civilian rule. During 1991 and 1992, many of the legal foundations of apartheid in South Africa were removed, undermining the rationale for the homelands' continued existence. The African National Congress pressed strongly for them to be reincorporated into South Africa. This was opposed by Gqozo and the other homeland leaders.

=== Bisho massacre ===
On 7 September 1992, the Ciskei Defence Force fired into a crowd of ANC members (led by Ronnie Kasrils, Cyril Ramaphosa, and Chris Hani) who demanded the reincorporation of Ciskei into South Africa. 28 people were killed, and hundreds injured in the massacre outside the sports stadium in Bisho, the small capital of Ciskei.

== Annexation ==
Gqozo refused to participate in the negotiations to agree to a post-apartheid constitution for South Africa, and initially threatened to boycott the first non-racial elections. This became unsustainable, and in March 1994, Ciskei government workers went on strike for fear of losing their job security and pensions in the post-apartheid era. The police then mutinied, prompting Gqozo to resign on 22 March. The Transitional Executive Council (TEC) appointed two administrators, who took control of the homeland to ensure security until the elections could be held the following month. The TEC also blocked the South African government from deploying the paramilitary Internal Stability Unit (ISU) of the South African Police force, as the unit was suspected of fomenting violence in other parts of the country after the Ciskei military had threatened to open fire on the ISU if it entered the territory.

On 27 April 1994, Ciskei and all of the other homelands were reincorporated into South Africa, after the first post-apartheid elections. Along with Transkei, Ciskei became part of the new Eastern Cape Province, with its capital becoming the capital of the new province, and the former territory of the Ciskei forming parts of the Buffalo City Metropolitan Municipality, the Chris Hani District Municipality, and the Amathole District Municipality—as of 2016.

== Economy ==
According to historian Quinn Slobodian, Ciskei, on the suggestion of a group of economists led by South African Leon Louw—called the "supply siders of Ciskei" by the Financial Times --, was operated as a de facto export processing zone of South Africa. Its economy was centered around the textile industry, with a majority female workforce, and was reliant on Taiwanese and Hong Kong investors, generous investor incentives by the South African government (including paying the wages of their employees, subsidizing 80% of their factories' rents, and not charging corporate tax), and repression of the labour movement.

== Districts in 1991 ==
Districts of the province, and their populations at the 1991 census.

- Alice: 43,452
- Whittlesea: 50,199
- Keiskammahoek: 32,740
- Mdantsane: 105,117
- Middledrift: 37,979
- Peddie: 52,245
- Zwelitsha: 142,779
- Mpofu: 13,056

== Law enforcement and defence ==
- Founded in 1981, the Ciskei Defence Force consisted of two battalions and an air wing.
- Ciskei Police
- Ciskei Police – Law Enforcement Division
- Ciskei Prisons Service
- Ciskei Traffic Force

== Notable persons ==
- Ngconde Balfour – former South African politician, served as Minister of Correctional Services, and Minister of Sport.
- Steve Biko – former political activist, founder and the president of Black Consciousness Movement.
- Oupa Gqozo – former Ciskeian President, and military head of state.
- Thandathu Jongilizwe Mabandla – former Ciskeian President, and Ciskeian Chief Justice.
- Shepherd Mdladlana – former minister of labour, politician, and South African High Commissioner to Canada.
- Raymond Mhlaba – former South African politician and leader of the ANC and SACP and the first Premier of the Eastern Cape 1994–1997.
- Wilton Mkwayi – former anti-apartheid activist, and member of ANC.
- Griffiths Mxenge – former political activist, and member of ANC.
- Bulelani Ngcuka – former NPA director (1999–2004).
- Looksmart Ngudle – former political activist, and member of ANC.
- Lennox Sebe – former Ciskeian President and dictator.
- Charles Sebe – former Ciskeian acting president and murder victim.
- Archie Sibeko – former anti-apartheid activist, and member of ANC.
- Robert Sobukwe – former political activist and the founder of PAC.
- Moses Twebe – former anti-apartheid activist, and member of ANC.

== See also ==
- Transkei
- Fengu people
- List of heads of state of Ciskei
- Vice President of Ciskei
- Ciskei Defence Force
- Bisho massacre
- Ciskei International Airways

== Books ==
- Mager, A.K. (1999) Gender and the Making of a South African Bantustan: A Social History of the Ciskei, 1945–1959, Heinemann.
- Switzer, L. (1993) Power and Resistance in an African Society: The Ciskei Xhosa and the Making of South Africa, University of Wisconsin Press.
