= Dikwankwetla Party of South Africa =

Political party in South Africa

- Leader: Moeketsi Lebesa
- Founder: Kenneth Mopeli
- Founded: 1974
- Headquarters: QwaQwa, Free State, South Africa

Dikwankwetla Party of South Africa is a political party in the Free State province, South Africa. The party was founded by Kenneth Mopeli in 1975. The party governed the bantustan state of QwaQwa from 1975 to 1994.

It was one of the signatories of the National Peace Accord, but later withdrew.

In the first non-racial elections held in South Africa in 1994, the party contested both parliamentary and provincial elections. It won 19,451 votes in the parliamentary elections (0.1% of nationwide vote) and 21,877 votes in the provincial elections in the Free State, failing to win seats in either.

After not standing in the 1999 elections, the party entered into an electoral pact with the Pan-Africanist Congress for the 2004 elections, after renouncing their pact with the Democratic Alliance. DPSA candidates contested on the PAC parliamentary lists. DPSA did, however, contest the provincial elections in the Free State, where it got 9,806 votes (0.97% of the votes in that province), again failing to win a seat. In the municipality of Maluti a Phofung (formerly the QwaQwa state) the party got 8,493 votes (6.7%). The party also has some small base of support in the central parts of the Free State and is the largest opposition party in the Maluti a Phofung council.

In the 2009 elections, the party again contested only the Free State provincial election, failing to win a seat. The party won a by-election in QwaQwa in December 2011.

== Election results ==
=== National elections ===
Election	Total votes	Share of vote	Seats	+/–	Government
1994	19,451	0.10%	0	–	extra-parliamentary

=== Provincial elections ===
==== Free State provincial elections ====
Election	Votes	%	Seats
1994	17,024	1.26	0
2004	9,806	0.97	0
2009	11,257	1.09	0

==== Gauteng provincial elections ====
Election	Votes	%	Seats
1994	4,853	0.12	0

=== Municipal elections ===
Election	Votes	%	Seats
2000		0.11%	10
2006		0.09%	6
2011	42,163	0.12%	10
2016	16,478	0.04%	4
2021	10,752	0.04%	3
