= Transkei National Independence Party =

Defunct political party in South Africa

Transkei National Independence Party iQela leTranskei leNkululeko (Xhosa)
- Leader: George Matanzima
- Founder: George Matanzima; Kaiser Matanzima
- Founded: October 26, 1976
- Dissolved: December 30, 1987
- Ideology: Xhosa nationalism; Transkei nationalism; Authoritarianism; Anti-communism; Economic liberalism; Pro-apartheid
- Political position: Far-right

Party flag

The Transkei National Independence Party (TNIP) was a political party in the nominally independent South African Xhosa bantustan of Transkei. It was founded by the Matanzima brothers, Kaiser and George.

The party advocated co-operation with the South African government. As of 1985, the leader of the party was George Matanzima. The party governed Transkei from 1976 until the 1987 coup d'état by Bantu Holomisa.

== Electoral history ==
- 1973: TNIP won 25 out of 43 elected seats (a further 64 seats were filled by chiefs appointed ex-officio by the government)
- 1976: TNIP won 69 out of 75 seats
- 1981: TNIP won 74 out of 75 seats
- 1986: TNIP won 57 out of 75 seats
