= Rustenburg Local Municipality elections =

Local elections in the North West Province, South Africa

The Rustenburg Local Municipality council consists of ninety members elected by mixed-member proportional representation. Forty-five councillors are elected by first-past-the-post voting in forty-five wards, while the remaining forty-five are chosen from party lists so that the total number of party representatives is proportional to the number of votes received.

In the election of 4 November 2026 no party won a majority, with the African National Congress (ANC) winning the most seats, thirty-five.

== Results ==
The following table shows the composition of the council after past elections.

Event	ACDP	AIC	ANC	BCM	DA	EFF	FSD	FF+	UCDP	UDM	Other	Total
2000 election	—	—	45	—	14	—	—	1	5	2	2	69
2006 election	1	—	53	—	11	—	—	1	3	0	3	72
2011 election	1	—	55	—	15	—	—	1	1	0	3	76
2016 election	0	1	43	1	14	24	4	1	0	1	0	89
2021 election	1	1	43	1	13	17	1	3	0	1	9	90
2026 election	0	0	35	—	13	12	—	3	0	0	27	90

== December 2000 election ==
The following table shows the results of the 2000 election.

Party	Ward			List			Total seats
Party	Votes	%	Seats	Votes	%	Seats	Total seats
African National Congress	31,108	64.75	30	31,407	65.20	15	45
Democratic Alliance	9,819	20.44	5	9,971	20.70	9	14
United Christian Democratic Party	3,436	7.15	0	3,693	7.67	5	5
Pan Africanist Congress of Azania	1,392	2.90	0	1,397	2.90	2	2
United Democratic Movement	1,440	3.00	0	1,252	2.60	2	2
Freedom Front Plus	388	0.81	0	453	0.94	1	1
Independent candidates	460	0.96	0				0
Total	48,043	100.00	35	48,173	100.00	34	69
Valid votes	48,043	97.69		48,173	97.41		
Invalid/blank votes	1,135	2.31		1,280	2.59		
Total votes	49,178	100.00		49,453	100.00		
Registered voters/turnout	169,024	29.10		169,024	29.26		

== March 2006 election ==
The following table shows the results of the 2006 election.

Party	Ward			List			Total seats
Party	Votes	%	Seats	Votes	%	Seats	Total seats
African National Congress	51,828	72.54	31	51,674	73.61	22	53
Democratic Alliance	10,828	15.16	5	10,761	15.33	6	11
United Christian Democratic Party	2,247	3.14	0	2,612	3.72	3	3
Freedom Front Plus	1,215	1.70	0	1,071	1.53	1	1
African Christian Democratic Party	984	1.38	0	904	1.29	1	1
People's Progressive Party	787	1.10	0	732	1.04	1	1
Independent Democrats	747	1.05	0	695	0.99	1	1
Independent candidates	1,396	1.95	0				0
United Independent Front	553	0.77	0	580	0.83	1	1
Pan Africanist Congress of Azania	459	0.64	0	416	0.59	0	0
Azanian People's Organisation	297	0.42	0	325	0.46	0	0
United Democratic Movement	107	0.15	0	430	0.61	0	0
Total	71,448	100.00	36	70,200	100.00	36	72
Valid votes	71,448	97.48		70,200	96.76		
Invalid/blank votes	1,849	2.52		2,352	3.24		
Total votes	73,297	100.00		72,552	100.00		
Registered voters/turnout	201,225	36.43		201,225	36.06		

== May 2011 election ==
The following table shows the results of the 2011 election.

Party	Ward			List			Total seats
Party	Votes	%	Seats	Votes	%	Seats	Total seats
African National Congress	74,784	69.95	31	78,255	73.82	24	55
Democratic Alliance	21,280	19.91	5	21,505	20.29	10	15
Independent candidates	5,397	5.05	2				2
Congress of the People	1,684	1.58	0	2,032	1.92	1	1
United Christian Democratic Party	838	0.78	0	1,145	1.08	1	1
Freedom Front Plus	996	0.93	0	567	0.53	1	1
African Christian Democratic Party	811	0.76	0	667	0.63	1	1
African People's Convention	471	0.44	0	794	0.75	0	0
South African Political Party	336	0.31	0	316	0.30	0	0
United Democratic Movement	98	0.09	0	379	0.36	0	0
Azanian People's Organisation	105	0.10	0	246	0.23	0	0
Movement Democratic Party	105	0.10	0	95	0.09	0	0
Total	106,905	100.00	38	106,001	100.00	38	76
Valid votes	106,905	97.97		106,001	97.45		
Invalid/blank votes	2,220	2.03		2,771	2.55		
Total votes	109,125	100.00		108,772	100.00		
Registered voters/turnout	242,435	45.01		242,435	44.87		

== August 2016 election ==
The following table shows the results of the 2016 election.

Party	Ward			List			Total seats
Party	Votes	%	Seats	Votes	%	Seats	Total seats
African National Congress	71,149	48.83	34	69,868	48.27	9	43
Economic Freedom Fighters	39,455	27.08	5	38,273	26.44	19	24
Democratic Alliance	23,446	16.09	6	23,013	15.90	8	14
Forum for Service Delivery	6,312	4.33	0	5,467	3.78	4	4
African Independent Congress	1,036	0.71	0	2,919	2.02	1	1
Freedom Front Plus	1,973	1.35	0	1,852	1.28	1	1
United Democratic Movement	529	0.36	0	974	0.67	1	1
Botho Community Movement	630	0.43	0	565	0.39	1	1
African People's Convention	390	0.27	0	415	0.29	0	0
United Christian Democratic Party	125	0.09	0	505	0.35	0	0
Independent candidates	577	0.40	0				0
African Christian Democratic Party	83	0.06	0	419	0.29	0	0
Congress of the People				404	0.28	0	0
Agang South Africa	12	0.01	0	67	0.05	0	0
Total	145,717	100.00	45	144,741	100.00	44	89
Valid votes	145,717	98.16		144,741	97.86		
Invalid/blank votes	2,731	1.84		3,171	2.14		
Total votes	148,448	100.00		147,912	100.00		
Registered voters/turnout	297,219	49.95		297,219	49.77		

== November 2021 election ==
The following table shows the results of the 2021 election.

Party	Ward			List			Total seats
Party	Votes	%	Seats	Votes	%	Seats	Total seats
African National Congress	46,291	45.51	35	48,875	47.96	8	43
Economic Freedom Fighters	17,574	17.28	1	18,896	18.54	16	17
Democratic Alliance	14,322	14.08	7	14,016	13.75	6	13
Tsogang Civic Movement	7,806	7.67	1	8,155	8.00	6	7
Independent candidates	7,525	7.40	1				1
Freedom Front Plus	3,614	3.55	0	3,514	3.45	3	3
Arona	540	0.53	0	1,603	1.57	1	1
African Independent Congress	408	0.40	0	1,193	1.17	1	1
Forum for Service Delivery	425	0.42	0	1,159	1.14	1	1
African Christian Democratic Party	814	0.80	0	757	0.74	1	1
United Democratic Movement	546	0.54	0	615	0.60	1	1
Botho Community Movement	470	0.46	0	433	0.42	1	1
African Transformation Movement	261	0.26	0	409	0.40	0	0
United Christian Democratic Party	180	0.18	0	398	0.39	0	0
Our City Matters	67	0.07	0	336	0.33	0	0
African Economic Transformers	103	0.10	0	274	0.27	0	0
Africa Restoration Alliance	200	0.20	0	173	0.17	0	0
African People's Convention	213	0.21	0	138	0.14	0	0
Abantu Batho Congress	159	0.16	0	140	0.14	0	0
Azanian Independent Community Movement	23	0.02	0	259	0.25	0	0
United Independent Movement	2	0.00	0	264	0.26	0	0
Congress of the People	37	0.04	0	153	0.15	0	0
Azanian People's Organisation	97	0.10	0	83	0.08	0	0
Forum for Democrats	26	0.03	0	67	0.07	0	0
Christian Ambassadors Political Party	9	0.01	0				0
Total	101,712	100.00	45	101,910	100.00	45	90
Valid votes	101,712	97.96		101,910	97.29		
Invalid/blank votes	2,118	2.04		2,836	2.71		
Total votes	103,830	100.00		104,746	100.00		
Registered voters/turnout	288,347	36.01		288,347	36.33		

After the election, the African National Congress (ANC) formed a coalition with the African Independent Congress (AIC), the independent candidate and Arona, together controlling a majority of 46 of the 90 seats.

=== By-elections from November 2021 ===
The following by-elections were held to fill vacant ward seats in the period from November 2021.

19 Jul 2023	11	African National Congress	African National Congress
28 Aug 2023	45	African National Congress	uMkhonto weSizwe
24 Jun 2026	15	Democratic Alliance	Democratic Alliance

== November 2026 election ==
The following table shows the results of the 2026 election.

Party	Ward			List			Total seats
Party	Votes	%	Seats	Votes	%	Seats	Total seats
African National Congress	53,986	37.87	35	54,121	38.60	0	35
Democratic Alliance	20,416	14.32	7	20,005	14.27	6	13
Economic Freedom Fighters	18,431	12.93	1	18,976	13.53	11	12
ActionSA	8,099	5.68	0	9,355	6.67	6	6
South African Communist Party	6,852	4.81	0	6,376	4.55	4	4
Freedom Front Plus	4,234	2.97	0	4,774	3.40	3	3
uMkhonto weSizwe Party	4,464	3.13	1	4,226	3.01	2	3
Labour Party	4,148	2.91	0	4,112	2.93	3	3
Seriti Le Kaelo Independent Party	3,732	2.62	1	3,442	2.45	1	2
Rustenburg People's Party	2,325	1.63	0	2,099	1.50	2	2
Lethabong Service Movement	1,951	1.37	0	2,013	1.44	1	1
Independent candidates	3,803	2.67	0				0
Patriotic Alliance	1,567	1.10	0	1,617	1.15	1	1
Badiredi Ba Setšhaba	1,264	0.89	0	1,186	0.85	1	1
Tsogang Civic Movement	747	0.52	0	817	0.58	1	1
African Transformation Movement	631	0.44	0	905	0.65	1	1
Purple Party Ikageng	713	0.50	0	754	0.54	1	1
Bakanana Pele Campaign	552	0.39	0	463	0.33	1	1
United Democratic Movement	973	0.68	0				0
African Independent Congress	322	0.23	0	611	0.44	0	0
People's Mandate Party	371	0.26	0	367	0.26	0	0
African Christian Democratic Party	254	0.18	0	477	0.34	0	0
African Economic Transformers	277	0.19	0	336	0.24	0	0
Afrika Mayibuye Movement	260	0.18	0	307	0.22	0	0
United Christian Democratic Party	248	0.17	0	303	0.22	0	0
Bophuthatswana Civil Movement	140	0.10	0	385	0.27	0	0
African People's Convention	244	0.17	0	214	0.15	0	0
African Economic Freedom	96	0.07	0	335	0.24	0	0
Azanian People's Organisation	236	0.17	0	180	0.13	0	0
United Africans Transformation	98	0.07	0	310	0.22	0	0
Congress of the People	218	0.15	0	159	0.11	0	0
Freedom in South Africa	144	0.10	0	111	0.08	0	0
South African Political Association	166	0.12	0	84	0.06	0	0
Al Jama-ah	90	0.06	0	130	0.09	0	0
Arona	81	0.06	0	126	0.09	0	0
Active African Christians United Movement	91	0.06	0	92	0.07	0	0
Inkatha Freedom Party	18	0.01	0	155	0.11	0	0
Community Priority Movement	69	0.05	0	87	0.06	0	0
Service Delivery Party	79	0.06	0	71	0.05	0	0
Economic Emancipation Forum	71	0.05	0	69	0.05	0	0
All Citizens Party	77	0.05	0				0
African Congress for Transformation				63	0.04	0	0
African Revolutionary Council	3	0.00	0				0
Total	142,541	100.00	45	140,213	100.00	45	90
Valid votes	142,541	97.41		140,213	96.77		
Invalid/blank votes	3,797	2.59		4,677	3.23		
Total votes	146,338	100.00		144,890	100.00		
Registered voters/turnout	324,605	45.08		324,605	44.64		
