= City of Matlosana Local Municipality elections =

Local elections in the North West Province, South Africa

The City of Matlosana Local Municipality council consists of seventy-seven members elected by mixed-member proportional representation. Thirty-nine councillors are elected by first-past-the-post voting in thirty-nine wards, while the remaining thirty-eight are chosen from party lists so that the total number of party representatives is proportional to the number of votes received.

In the election of 4 November 2026 the African National Congress (ANC) lost its majority, but remains the largest party, with thirty-two seats on the council.

== Results ==
The following table shows the composition of the council after past elections.

Event	ACDP	ANC	COPE	DA	EFF	FSD	FF+	UCDP	Other	Total
2000 election	1	44	—	12	—	—	1	1	1	60
2006 election	1	46	—	9	—	—	2	1	2	61
2011 election	0	51	1	16	—	—	2	—	0	70
2016 election	—	46	1	17	7	2	3	—	1	77
2021 election	1	40	0	16	9	2	7	—	2	77
2026 election	0	32	—	20	6	—	6	0	13	77

== December 2000 election ==
The following table shows the results of the 2000 election.

Party	Ward			List			Total seats
Party	Votes	%	Seats	Votes	%	Seats	Total seats
African National Congress	54,974	70.74	22	57,801	74.71	22	44
Democratic Alliance	15,028	19.34	7	15,351	19.84	5	12
Independent candidates	3,598	4.63	1				1
African Christian Democratic Party	1,815	2.34	0	1,245	1.61	1	1
Freedom Front Plus	1,374	1.77	0	980	1.27	1	1
United Christian Democratic Party	594	0.76	0	857	1.11	1	1
United Democratic Movement	212	0.27	0	675	0.87	0	0
Noordwes Forum	116	0.15	0	461	0.60	0	0
Total	77,711	100.00	30	77,370	100.00	30	60
Valid votes	77,711	97.63		77,370	97.23		
Invalid/blank votes	1,888	2.37		2,203	2.77		
Total votes	79,599	100.00		79,573	100.00		
Registered voters/turnout	160,004	49.75		160,004	49.73		

== March 2006 election ==
The following table shows the results of the 2006 election.

Party	Ward			List			Total seats
Party	Votes	%	Seats	Votes	%	Seats	Total seats
African National Congress	57,348	71.65	25	59,974	75.16	21	46
Democratic Alliance	11,681	14.59	6	12,075	15.13	3	9
Freedom Front Plus	2,261	2.82	0	2,141	2.68	2	2
Independent candidates	4,385	5.48	0				0
Independent Democrats	1,417	1.77	0	1,907	2.39	1	1
African Christian Democratic Party	995	1.24	0	1,038	1.30	1	1
United Christian Democratic Party	758	0.95	0	916	1.15	1	1
United Democratic Movement	381	0.48	0	692	0.87	1	1
Pan Africanist Congress of Azania	545	0.68	0	526	0.66	0	0
Inkatha Freedom Party	96	0.12	0	314	0.39	0	0
United Independent Front	171	0.21	0	216	0.27	0	0
Total	80,038	100.00	31	79,799	100.00	30	61
Valid votes	80,038	98.03		79,799	96.94		
Invalid/blank votes	1,610	1.97		2,515	3.06		
Total votes	81,648	100.00		82,314	100.00		
Registered voters/turnout	173,537	47.05		173,537	47.43		

== May 2011 election ==
The following table shows the results of the 2011 election.

Party	Ward			List			Total seats
Party	Votes	%	Seats	Votes	%	Seats	Total seats
African National Congress	74,825	72.58	26	75,205	72.82	25	51
Democratic Alliance	22,528	21.85	9	22,840	22.11	7	16
Freedom Front Plus	2,290	2.22	0	1,931	1.87	2	2
Congress of the People	1,769	1.72	0	1,596	1.55	1	1
African Christian Democratic Party	565	0.55	0	469	0.45	0	0
African People's Convention	390	0.38	0	573	0.55	0	0
Pan Africanist Congress of Azania	173	0.17	0	150	0.15	0	0
United Democratic Movement	112	0.11	0	185	0.18	0	0
National Freedom Party	80	0.08	0	149	0.14	0	0
Azanian People's Organisation	61	0.06	0	140	0.14	0	0
Independent candidates	179	0.17	0				0
Independent Ratepayers Association of SA	103	0.10	0				0
South African Political Party	19	0.02	0	41	0.04	0	0
Total	103,094	100.00	35	103,279	100.00	35	70
Valid votes	103,094	98.48		103,279	98.78		
Invalid/blank votes	1,596	1.52		1,273	1.22		
Total votes	104,690	100.00		104,552	100.00		
Registered voters/turnout	184,971	56.60		184,971	56.52		

== August 2016 election ==
The following table shows the results of the 2016 election.

Party	Ward			List			Total seats
Party	Votes	%	Seats	Votes	%	Seats	Total seats
African National Congress	65,309	60.92	31	62,375	59.70	15	46
Democratic Alliance	22,721	21.20	8	22,722	21.75	9	17
Economic Freedom Fighters	9,922	9.26	0	9,830	9.41	7	7
Freedom Front Plus	4,255	3.97	0	4,146	3.97	3	3
Forum for Service Delivery	3,220	3.00	0	2,896	2.77	2	2
Independent Ratepayers Association of SA	1,409	1.31	0	1,102	1.05	1	1
Congress of the People	188	0.18	0	1,108	1.06	1	1
Pan Africanist Congress of Azania	46	0.04	0	198	0.19	0	0
Movemeant of God	37	0.03	0	102	0.10	0	0
Independent candidates	90	0.08	0				0
Total	107,197	100.00	39	104,479	100.00	38	77
Valid votes	107,197	98.38		104,479	97.76		
Invalid/blank votes	1,767	1.62		2,391	2.24		
Total votes	108,964	100.00		106,870	100.00		
Registered voters/turnout	190,132	57.31		190,132	56.21		

== November 2021 election ==
The following table shows the results of the 2021 election.

Party	Ward			List			Total seats
Party	Votes	%	Seats	Votes	%	Seats	Total seats
African National Congress	38,845	51.83	31	39,800	52.60	9	40
Democratic Alliance	15,511	20.69	7	15,552	20.55	9	16
Economic Freedom Fighters	8,528	11.38	0	8,750	11.56	9	9
Freedom Front Plus	6,670	8.90	1	6,571	8.68	6	7
Forum for Service Delivery	1,737	2.32	0	1,828	2.42	2	2
Patriotic Alliance	1,386	1.85	0	1,517	2.00	2	2
African Christian Democratic Party	510	0.68	0	476	0.63	1	1
Independent candidates	941	1.26	0				0
African Transformation Movement	277	0.37	0	411	0.54	0	0
Congress of the People	156	0.21	0	233	0.31	0	0
United Democratic Movement	121	0.16	0	175	0.23	0	0
Independent Ratepayers Association of SA	151	0.20	0	131	0.17	0	0
International Revelation Congress	53	0.07	0	228	0.30	0	0
Abantu Batho Congress	67	0.09	0				0
Total	74,953	100.00	39	75,672	100.00	38	77
Valid votes	74,953	97.82		75,672	98.05		
Invalid/blank votes	1,672	2.18		1,504	1.95		
Total votes	76,625	100.00		77,176	100.00		
Registered voters/turnout	181,905	42.12		181,905	42.43		

=== By-elections from November 2021 ===
The following by-elections were held to fill vacant ward seats in the period from November 2021.

Date	Ward	Party of the previous councillor	Party of the newly elected councillor
11 Oct 2023	16	Democratic Alliance	Democratic Alliance
11 Oct 2023	17	Democratic Alliance	Democratic Alliance
17 Jul 2024	1	African National Congress	African National Congress
17 Jul 2024	25	African National Congress	African National Congress
11 Sep 2024	39	Democratic Alliance	Democratic Alliance
14 May 2026	20	African National Congress	African National Congress

== November 2026 election ==
The following table shows the results of the 2026 election.

Party	Ward			List			Total seats
Party	Votes	%	Seats	Votes	%	Seats	Total seats
African National Congress	39,126	41.15	30	39,073	41.18	2	32
Democratic Alliance	24,847	26.13	8	24,748	26.08	12	20
Economic Freedom Fighters	7,398	7.78	0	7,697	8.11	6	6
Freedom Front Plus	7,097	7.46	1	7,367	7.76	5	6
South African Communist Party	3,415	3.59	0	2,997	3.16	3	3
ActionSA	2,982	3.14	0	3,115	3.28	3	3
uMkhonto weSizwe Party	2,682	2.82	0	2,753	2.90	2	2
Matlosana Service Delivery Movement	1,386	1.46	0	1,810	1.91	1	1
Patriotic Alliance	1,405	1.48	0	1,392	1.47	1	1
Independent candidates	1,481	1.56	0				0
United Africans Transformation	598	0.63	0	805	0.85	1	1
All Citizens Party	578	0.61	0	502	0.53	1	1
People's Freedom Party	476	0.50	0	473	0.50	1	1
Afrika Mayibuye Movement	317	0.33	0	313	0.33	0	0
African Christian Democratic Party	177	0.19	0	397	0.42	0	0
Pan Africanist Congress of Azania	171	0.18	0	276	0.29	0	0
African Transformation Movement	100	0.11	0	311	0.33	0	0
African Congress for Transformation	184	0.19	0	225	0.24	0	0
Labour Party of South Africa	200	0.21	0	178	0.19	0	0
Inkatha Freedom Party	81	0.09	0	143	0.15	0	0
Amalgamated Concerned Residents Association	112	0.12	0	107	0.11	0	0
Independent Ratepayers Association of SA	111	0.12	0	103	0.11	0	0
United Christian Democratic Party	65	0.07	0	106	0.11	0	0
African Movement Congress	57	0.06	0				0
Azanian Ground Forces	35	0.04	0				0
Total	95,081	100.00	39	94,891	100.00	38	77
Valid votes	95,081	97.84		94,891	97.75		
Invalid/blank votes	2,099	2.16		2,185	2.25		
Total votes	97,180	100.00		97,076	100.00		
Registered voters/turnout	202,310	48.04		202,310	47.98		
