= Mahikeng Local Municipality elections =

Local elections in the North West Province, South Africa

The Mahikeng Local Municipality council consists of seventy members elected by mixed-member proportional representation. Thirty-five councillors are elected by first-past-the-post voting in thirty-five wards, while the remaining thirty-five are chosen from party lists so that the total number of party representatives is proportional to the number of votes received.

In the election of 4 November 2026 the African National Congress (ANC) lost is majority for the first time, but won the most seats in the council.

== Results ==
The following table shows the composition of the council after past elections.

Event	ACDP	ANC	COPE	DA	EFF	FSD	UCDP	Other	Total
2000 election	—	30	—	1	—	—	24	1	56
2006 election	1	39	—	1	—	—	13	2	56
2011 election	1	44	3	7	—	—	6	1	62
2016 election	1	43	1	7	12	3	2	0	69
2021 election	1	40	0	5	17	2	2	3	70
2026 election	1	34	—	7	9	—	1	18	70

== December 2000 election ==
The following table shows the results of the 2000 election.

Party	Ward			List			Total seats
Party	Votes	%	Seats	Votes	%	Seats	Total seats
African National Congress	23,363	53.87	19	23,109	53.47	11	30
United Christian Democratic Party	18,733	43.19	9	18,436	42.65	15	24
Democratic Alliance	915	2.11	0	1,204	2.79	1	1
United Democratic Movement	172	0.40	0	473	1.09	1	1
Independent candidates	189	0.44	0				0
Total	43,372	100.00	28	43,222	100.00	28	56
Valid votes	43,372	97.56		43,222	97.22		
Invalid/blank votes	1,086	2.44		1,237	2.78		
Total votes	44,458	100.00		44,459	100.00		
Registered voters/turnout	105,306	42.22		105,306	42.22		

== March 2006 election ==
The following table shows the results of the 2006 election.

Party	Ward			List			Total seats
Party	Votes	%	Seats	Votes	%	Seats	Total seats
African National Congress	34,046	64.15	27	36,894	69.78	12	39
United Christian Democratic Party	11,185	21.08	0	12,115	22.92	13	13
Independent candidates	5,251	9.89	1				1
Democratic Alliance	968	1.82	0	1,004	1.90	1	1
African Christian Democratic Party	582	1.10	0	1,277	2.42	1	1
Independent Democrats	642	1.21	0	671	1.27	1	1
Pan Africanist Congress of Azania	320	0.60	0	564	1.07	0	0
United Democratic Movement	78	0.15	0	344	0.65	0	0
Total	53,072	100.00	28	52,869	100.00	28	56
Valid votes	53,072	97.43		52,869	96.81		
Invalid/blank votes	1,401	2.57		1,741	3.19		
Total votes	54,473	100.00		54,610	100.00		
Registered voters/turnout	118,963	45.79		118,963	45.91		

== May 2011 election ==
The following table shows the results of the 2011 election.

Party	Ward			List			Total seats
Party	Votes	%	Seats	Votes	%	Seats	Total seats
African National Congress	41,805	66.55	31	45,081	71.71	13	44
Democratic Alliance	6,321	10.06	0	6,356	10.11	7	7
United Christian Democratic Party	5,904	9.40	0	5,782	9.20	6	6
Congress of the People	2,649	4.22	0	3,088	4.91	3	3
Independent candidates	3,854	6.14	0				0
South African Political Party	1,288	2.05	0	1,197	1.90	1	1
African Christian Democratic Party	997	1.59	0	1,363	2.17	1	1
Total	62,818	100.00	31	62,867	100.00	31	62
Valid votes	62,818	97.37		62,867	97.40		
Invalid/blank votes	1,697	2.63		1,680	2.60		
Total votes	64,515	100.00		64,547	100.00		
Registered voters/turnout	124,092	51.99		124,092	52.02		

== August 2016 election ==
The following table shows the results of the 2016 election.

Party	Ward			List			Total seats
Party	Votes	%	Seats	Votes	%	Seats	Total seats
African National Congress	40,048	61.16	35	39,814	60.86	8	43
Economic Freedom Fighters	11,090	16.94	0	12,043	18.41	12	12
Democratic Alliance	6,498	9.92	0	6,668	10.19	7	7
Forum for Service Delivery	2,893	4.42	0	2,899	4.43	3	3
United Christian Democratic Party	1,630	2.49	0	1,702	2.60	2	2
African Christian Democratic Party	769	1.17	0	769	1.18	1	1
Independent candidates	1,524	2.33	0				0
Congress of the People	264	0.40	0	697	1.07	1	1
South African Political Party	283	0.43	0	386	0.59	0	0
Freedom Front Plus	237	0.36	0	228	0.35	0	0
United Democratic Movement	137	0.21	0	213	0.33	0	0
Pan Africanist Congress of Azania	109	0.17	0				0
Total	65,482	100.00	35	65,419	100.00	34	69
Valid votes	65,482	97.88		65,419	97.54		
Invalid/blank votes	1,415	2.12		1,649	2.46		
Total votes	66,897	100.00		67,068	100.00		
Registered voters/turnout	134,207	49.85		134,207	49.97		

== November 2021 election ==
The following table shows the results of the 2021 election.

Party	Ward			List			Total seats
Party	Votes	%	Seats	Votes	%	Seats	Total seats
African National Congress	27,487	56.72	35	27,413	56.43	5	40
Economic Freedom Fighters	11,879	24.51	0	12,029	24.76	17	17
Democratic Alliance	3,038	6.27	0	3,111	6.40	5	5
Forum for Service Delivery	1,445	2.98	0	1,410	2.90	2	2
United Christian Democratic Party	788	1.63	0	1,267	2.61	2	2
Patriotic Alliance	599	1.24	0	633	1.30	1	1
African Christian Democratic Party	649	1.34	0	582	1.20	1	1
Independent candidates	1,102	2.27	0				0
African Independent Congress	217	0.45	0	773	1.59	1	1
Freedom Front Plus	331	0.68	0	278	0.57	1	1
Abantu Batho Congress	256	0.53	0	196	0.40	0	0
Inkatha Freedom Party	122	0.25	0	276	0.57	0	0
Batho Pele Party	117	0.24	0	203	0.42	0	0
Congress of the People	125	0.26	0	162	0.33	0	0
Forum for Democrats	151	0.31	0	71	0.15	0	0
South African United National Democratic Front	109	0.22	0	40	0.08	0	0
African Transformation Movement	21	0.04	0	93	0.19	0	0
United Independent Movement	25	0.05	0	45	0.09	0	0
Total	48,461	100.00	35	48,582	100.00	35	70
Valid votes	48,461	97.83		48,582	97.35		
Invalid/blank votes	1,077	2.17		1,324	2.65		
Total votes	49,538	100.00		49,906	100.00		
Registered voters/turnout	131,902	37.56		131,902	37.84		

=== By-elections from November 2021 ===
The following by-elections were held to fill vacant ward seats in the period since November 2021.

Date	Ward	Party of the previous councillor	Party of the newly elected councillor
4 May 2022	63803005	African National Congress	Economic Freedom Fighters

== November 2026 election ==
The following table shows the results of the 2026 election.

Party	Ward			List			Total seats
Party	Votes	%	Seats	Votes	%	Seats	Total seats
African National Congress	30,073	44.42	34	30,061	44.13	0	34
Economic Freedom Fighters	9,490	14.02	1	9,596	14.09	8	9
Democratic Alliance	7,277	10.75	0	7,866	11.55	7	7
ActionSA	5,566	8.22	0	6,105	8.96	6	6
uMkhonto weSizwe Party	3,423	5.06	0	3,135	4.60	3	3
South African Communist Party	1,579	2.33	0	1,483	2.18	2	2
United Christian Democratic Party	1,422	2.10	0	1,460	2.14	1	1
Patriotic Alliance	1,351	2.00	0	1,502	2.20	1	1
Afrika Mayibuye Movement	1,377	2.03	0	1,271	1.87	1	1
African Spear Movement	873	1.29	0	823	1.21	1	1
Independent candidates	1,523	2.25	0				0
Bophuthatswana Civil Movement	454	0.67	0	1,038	1.52	1	1
Freedom Front Plus	589	0.87	0	663	0.97	1	1
All and Citizens	689	1.02	0	512	0.75	1	1
African Independent Congress	504	0.74	0	654	0.96	1	1
African Christian Democratic Party	446	0.66	0	497	0.73	1	1
Inkatha Freedom Party	287	0.42	0	382	0.56	0	0
Kopano Movement	293	0.43	0	266	0.39	0	0
African People's Convention	268	0.40	0	202	0.30	0	0
African Revolutionary Council	57	0.08	0	195	0.29	0	0
United Africans Transformation	34	0.05	0	188	0.28	0	0
Forum for Democrats	78	0.12	0	50	0.07	0	0
Save Ditsobotla Movement	29	0.04	0	89	0.13	0	0
Pan Africanist Congress of Azania	19	0.03	0	82	0.12	0	0
Total	67,701	100.00	35	68,120	100.00	35	70
Valid votes	67,701	98.09		68,120	98.13		
Invalid/blank votes	1,318	1.91		1,299	1.87		
Total votes	69,019	100.00		69,419	100.00		
Registered voters/turnout	150,161	45.96		150,161	46.23		
