= Ditsobotla Local Municipality elections =

Local elections in the North West Province, South Africa

The Ditsobotla Local Municipality council consists of thirty-nine members elected by mixed-member proportional representation. Twenty councillors are elected by first-past-the-post voting in twenty wards, while the remaining nineteen are chosen from party lists so that the total number of party representatives is proportional to the number of votes received.

In the election of 4 November 2026, no party won a majority. The African National Congress (ANC) won the most seats on the council.

== Results ==
The following table shows the composition of the council after past elections.

Event	ACDP	ANC	DA	EFF	FSD	FF+	UCDP	Other	Total
2000 election	—	28	4	—	—	—	5	1	38
2006 election	1	29	3	—	—	1	3	1	38
2011 election	0	32	7	—	—	1	1	1	42
2016 election	1	25	7	5	1	1	0	0	40
2021 election	1	21	6	6	2	2	—	1	39
2022 election	0	16	6	10	2	1	0	4	39
2026 election	0	18	5	4	—	1	0	11	39

== December 2000 election ==
The following table shows the results of the 2000 election.

Party	Ward			List			Total seats
Party	Votes	%	Seats	Votes	%	Seats	Total seats
African National Congress	16,406	65.82	17	18,313	71.54	11	28
United Christian Democratic Party	2,742	11.00	0	3,185	12.44	5	5
Democratic Alliance	2,101	8.43	2	3,193	12.47	2	4
Independent candidates	2,708	10.87	0				0
Noordwes Forum	967	3.88	0	906	3.54	1	1
Total	24,924	100.00	19	25,597	100.00	19	38
Valid votes	24,924	96.86		25,597	96.77		
Invalid/blank votes	808	3.14		854	3.23		
Total votes	25,732	100.00		26,451	100.00		
Registered voters/turnout	61,460	41.87		61,460	43.04		

== March 2006 election ==
The following table shows the results of the 2006 election.

Party	Ward			List			Total seats
Party	Votes	%	Seats	Votes	%	Seats	Total seats
African National Congress	23,842	72.60	17	25,315	79.04	12	29
Democratic Alliance	2,451	7.46	1	2,417	7.55	2	3
United Christian Democratic Party	2,237	6.81	0	2,589	8.08	3	3
Independent candidates	2,854	8.69	1				1
Freedom Front Plus	497	1.51	0	706	2.20	1	1
African Christian Democratic Party	553	1.68	0	516	1.61	1	1
Independent Democrats	406	1.24	0	485	1.51	0	0
Total	32,840	100.00	19	32,028	100.00	19	38
Valid votes	32,840	97.68		32,028	95.48		
Invalid/blank votes	780	2.32		1,516	4.52		
Total votes	33,620	100.00		33,544	100.00		
Registered voters/turnout	69,210	48.58		69,210	48.47		

== May 2011 election ==
The following table shows the results of the 2011 election.

Party	Ward			List			Total seats
Party	Votes	%	Seats	Votes	%	Seats	Total seats
African National Congress	28,931	74.26	19	29,855	77.32	13	32
Democratic Alliance	5,901	15.15	2	5,801	15.02	5	7
Congress of the People	1,299	3.33	0	1,230	3.19	1	1
United Christian Democratic Party	844	2.17	0	773	2.00	1	1
Independent candidates	980	2.52	0				0
Freedom Front Plus	490	1.26	0	405	1.05	1	1
African Christian Democratic Party	271	0.70	0	323	0.84	0	0
South African Political Party	244	0.63	0	226	0.59	0	0
Total	38,960	100.00	21	38,613	100.00	21	42
Valid votes	38,960	97.56		38,613	96.78		
Invalid/blank votes	974	2.44		1,283	3.22		
Total votes	39,934	100.00		39,896	100.00		
Registered voters/turnout	70,278	56.82		70,278	56.77		

== August 2016 election ==
The following table shows the results of the 2016 election.

Party	Ward			List			Total seats
Party	Votes	%	Seats	Votes	%	Seats	Total seats
African National Congress	22,201	61.54	18	22,262	61.79	7	25
Democratic Alliance	6,431	17.83	2	6,495	18.03	5	7
Economic Freedom Fighters	4,238	11.75	0	4,349	12.07	5	5
Freedom Front Plus	926	2.57	0	933	2.59	1	1
Forum for Service Delivery	777	2.15	0	735	2.04	1	1
African Christian Democratic Party	442	1.23	0	448	1.24	1	1
African People's Convention	247	0.68	0	329	0.91	0	0
Independent candidates	449	1.24	0				0
Congress of the People	186	0.52	0	241	0.67	0	0
United Christian Democratic Party	179	0.50	0	239	0.66	0	0
Total	36,076	100.00	20	36,031	100.00	20	40
Valid votes	36,076	97.66		36,031	97.63		
Invalid/blank votes	866	2.34		876	2.37		
Total votes	36,942	100.00		36,907	100.00		
Registered voters/turnout	72,316	51.08		72,316	51.04		

== November 2021 election ==
The following table shows the results of the 2021 election.

Party	Ward			List			Total seats
Party	Votes	%	Seats	Votes	%	Seats	Total seats
African National Congress	15,005	50.00	17	15,625	53.19	4	21
Economic Freedom Fighters	4,195	13.98	0	4,838	16.47	6	6
Democratic Alliance	4,276	14.25	3	4,291	14.61	3	6
Independent candidates	3,082	10.27	0				0
Freedom Front Plus	1,226	4.09	0	1,305	4.44	2	2
Forum for Service Delivery	1,082	3.61	0	1,109	3.78	2	2
African Christian Democratic Party	401	1.34	0	442	1.50	1	1
African Independent Congress				770	2.62	1	1
Patriotic Alliance	223	0.74	0	273	0.93	0	0
African Freedom Revolution	163	0.54	0	190	0.65	0	0
Abantu Batho Congress	137	0.46	0	127	0.43	0	0
United Independent Movement	126	0.42	0	116	0.39	0	0
Congress of the People	80	0.27	0	108	0.37	0	0
African People's Convention	8	0.03	0	116	0.39	0	0
African Transformation Movement	3	0.01	0	64	0.22	0	0
Total	30,007	100.00	20	29,374	100.00	19	39
Valid votes	30,007	97.03		29,374	95.10		
Invalid/blank votes	918	2.97		1,515	4.90		
Total votes	30,925	100.00		30,889	100.00		
Registered voters/turnout	69,421	44.55		69,421	44.50		

== December 2022 election ==
After infighting between two African National Congress factions, resulting in the council having two mayors and two speakers, the entire council was dissolved by the national and provincial governments. Elections for a new council were held in December 2022.

Party	Ward			List			Total seats
Party	Votes	%	Seats	Votes	%	Seats	Total seats
African National Congress			15			1	16
Economic Freedom Fighters			2			8	10
Democratic Alliance			3			3	6
Forum for Service Delivery			0			2	2
Patriotic Alliance			0			2	2
Freedom Front Plus			0			1	1
Save Disobotla Movement			0			1	1
African Heart Congress			0			1	1
Independent candidates			0				0
African Christian Democratic Party			0			0	0
Active African Christians United Movement			0			0	0
African People First			0			0	0
Pan Africanist Congress of Azania			0			0	0
Forum for Democrats			0			0	0
International Revelation Congress			0			0	0
United Christian Democratic Party			0			0	0
Total			20			19	39

== November 2026 election ==
The following table shows the results of the 2026 election.

Party	Ward			List			Total seats
Party	Votes	%	Seats	Votes	%	Seats	Total seats
African National Congress	16,053	39.55	18	16,106	39.49	0	18
Democratic Alliance	5,952	14.66	2	6,169	15.12	3	5
Economic Freedom Fighters	4,097	10.09	0	4,102	10.06	4	4
Save Ditsobotla Movement	2,539	6.25	0	2,460	6.03	2	2
Patriotic Alliance	2,222	5.47	0	1,837	4.50	2	2
uMkhonto weSizwe Party	1,872	4.61	0	1,706	4.18	2	2
ActionSA	1,501	3.70	0	1,635	4.01	2	2
Kopano Movement	1,383	3.41	0	1,371	3.36	1	1
Freedom Front Plus	1,157	2.85	0	1,186	2.91	1	1
South African Communist Party	1,180	2.91	0	1,122	2.75	1	1
African Transformation Movement	526	1.30	0	544	1.33	1	1
Pan Africanist Congress of Azania	102	0.25	0	537	1.32	0	0
Afrika Mayibuye Movement	304	0.75	0	285	0.70	0	0
New Force	248	0.61	0	245	0.60	0	0
African People's Convention	296	0.73	0	194	0.48	0	0
African Christian Democratic Party	228	0.56	0	221	0.54	0	0
Bophuthatswana Civil Movement	214	0.53	0	216	0.53	0	0
African Heart Congress	165	0.41	0	138	0.34	0	0
African Spear Movement	109	0.27	0	126	0.31	0	0
United Christian Democratic Party	82	0.20	0	103	0.25	0	0
Inkatha Freedom Party	69	0.17	0	99	0.24	0	0
African Revolutionary Council	39	0.10	0	117	0.29	0	0
United Africans Transformation	31	0.08	0	106	0.26	0	0
Service Delivery Party	51	0.13	0	69	0.17	0	0
All Citizens Party	62	0.15	0	43	0.11	0	0
Labour Party of South Africa	41	0.10	0	32	0.08	0	0
Freedom in South Africa	49	0.12	0	18	0.04	0	0
Independent candidates	20	0.05	0				0
Total	40,592	100.00	20	40,787	100.00	19	39
Valid votes	40,592	96.73		40,787	96.65		
Invalid/blank votes	1,374	3.27		1,413	3.35		
Total votes	41,966	100.00		42,200	100.00		
Registered voters/turnout	80,461	52.16		80,461	52.45		
