= Ramotshere Moiloa Local Municipality elections =

Local elections in the North West Province, South Africa

The Ramotshere Moiloa Local Municipality council consists of thirty-seven members elected by mixed-member proportional representation. Nineteen councillors are elected by first-past-the-post voting in nineteen wards, while the remaining eighteen are chosen from party lists so that the total number of party representatives is proportional to the number of votes received.

In the election of 4 November 2026 the African National Congress (ANC) lost its majority for the first time, falling one seat short.

== Results ==
The following table shows the composition of the council after past elections.

Event	ANC	DA	EFF	FF+	UCDP	Other	Total
2000 election	22	1	—	—	11	0	34
2006 election	25	1	—	—	8	0	34
2011 election	29	2	—	—	5	3	39
2016 election	23	2	3	1	1	5	38
2021 election	23	1	6	1	1	5	37
2021 election (recount)	23	1	5	1	1	6	37
2026 election (recount)	18	2	3	1	1	12	37

== December 2000 election ==
The following table shows the results of the 2000 election.

Party	Ward			List			Total seats
Party	Votes	%	Seats	Votes	%	Seats	Total seats
African National Congress	17,797	63.19	14	18,040	63.98	8	22
United Christian Democratic Party	8,789	31.21	3	8,950	31.74	8	11
Democratic Alliance	834	2.96	0	1,003	3.56	1	1
Independent candidates	614	2.18	0				0
United Democratic Movement	131	0.47	0	203	0.72	0	0
Total	28,165	100.00	17	28,196	100.00	17	34
Valid votes	28,165	97.87		28,196	98.06		
Invalid/blank votes	613	2.13		559	1.94		
Total votes	28,778	100.00		28,755	100.00		
Registered voters/turnout	56,608	50.84		56,608	50.80		

== March 2006 election ==
The following table shows the results of the 2006 election.

Party	Ward			List			Total seats
Party	Votes	%	Seats	Votes	%	Seats	Total seats
African National Congress	21,238	70.93	16	22,130	74.20	9	25
United Christian Democratic Party	6,444	21.52	0	6,494	21.78	8	8
Democratic Alliance	1,251	4.18	1	1,199	4.02	0	1
Independent candidates	1,008	3.37	0				0
Total	29,941	100.00	17	29,823	100.00	17	34
Valid votes	29,941	97.16		29,823	96.94		
Invalid/blank votes	875	2.84		941	3.06		
Total votes	30,816	100.00		30,764	100.00		
Registered voters/turnout	63,108	48.83		63,108	48.75		

== May 2011 election ==
The following table shows the results of the 2011 election.

Party	Ward			List			Total seats
Party	Votes	%	Seats	Votes	%	Seats	Total seats
African National Congress	24,589	72.17	20	25,009	75.33	9	29
United Christian Democratic Party	4,161	12.21	0	4,261	12.83	5	5
Democratic Alliance	2,079	6.10	0	1,835	5.53	2	2
Congress of the People	1,183	3.47	0	1,203	3.62	2	2
Independent candidates	1,183	3.47	0				0
Working-Together Political Party	322	0.95	0	338	1.02	1	1
African Christian Democratic Party	298	0.87	0	272	0.82	0	0
South African Political Party	257	0.75	0	283	0.85	0	0
Total	34,072	100.00	20	33,201	100.00	19	39
Valid votes	34,072	97.68		33,201	96.71		
Invalid/blank votes	808	2.32		1,129	3.29		
Total votes	34,880	100.00		34,330	100.00		
Registered voters/turnout	65,392	53.34		65,392	52.50		

== August 2016 election ==
The following table shows the results of the 2016 election.

Party	Ward			List			Total seats
Party	Votes	%	Seats	Votes	%	Seats	Total seats
African National Congress	21,207	59.60	19	21,349	61.18	4	23
Economic Freedom Fighters	5,042	14.17	0	5,094	14.60	6	6
Are Ageng Afrika	2,948	8.29	0	3,048	8.73	3	3
Democratic Alliance	2,086	5.86	0	2,324	6.66	2	2
United Christian Democratic Party	916	2.57	0	1,051	3.01	1	1
Independent candidates	1,508	4.24	0				0
Agang South Africa	506	1.42	0	574	1.64	1	1
Working-Together Political Party	492	1.38	0	504	1.44	1	1
Freedom Front Plus	456	1.28	0	464	1.33	1	1
Azanian People's Organisation	213	0.60	0	264	0.76	0	0
African Christian Democratic Party	208	0.58	0	224	0.64	0	0
Total	35,582	100.00	19	34,896	100.00	19	38
Valid votes	35,582	97.80		34,896	97.64		
Invalid/blank votes	801	2.20		843	2.36		
Total votes	36,383	100.00		35,739	100.00		
Registered voters/turnout	68,743	52.93		68,743	51.99		

== November 2021 election ==
In the aftermath of the election, the Forum for Democrats (FFD) contested the results, claiming a counting error by the Independent Electoral Commission (IEC). The IEC acknowledged the error, which saw the Economic Freedom Fighters (EFF) allocated six seats. Correcting the error would have seen one of these seats instead allocated to the FFD, but the municipality did not take action to replace the EFF councillor. The FFD (along with the Freedom Advocacy Network) approached the North West High Court, and the judgement awarded the seat to the FFD in March 2022.

The following table shows the results of the 2021 election after the recount.

Party	Ward			List			Total seats
Party	Votes	%	Seats	Votes	%	Seats	Total seats
African National Congress	19,746	61.50	19	19,634	61.30	4	23
Economic Freedom Fighters	4,485	13.97	0	4,543	14.18	5	5
Forum for Service Delivery	4,222	13.15	0	4,264	13.31	5	5
Freedom Front Plus	1,060	3.30	0	973	3.04	1	1
Democratic Alliance	808	2.52	0	838	2.62	1	1
United Christian Democratic Party	705	2.20	0	929	2.90	1	1
Forum for Democrats	268	0.83	0	229	0.71	1	1
Independent candidates	339	1.06	0				0
Abantu Batho Congress	174	0.54	0	162	0.51	0	0
Progressive Change	151	0.47	0	158	0.49	0	0
Economic Emancipation Forum	92	0.29	0	63	0.20	0	0
Congress of the People	8	0.02	0	135	0.42	0	0
Are Ageng Afrika	45	0.14	0	58	0.18	0	0
Azanian People's Organisation	4	0.01	0	44	0.14	0	0
Total	32,107	100.00	19	32,030	100.00	18	37
Valid votes	32,107	97.91		32,030	97.72		
Invalid/blank votes	687	2.09		746	2.28		
Total votes	32,794	100.00		32,776	100.00		
Registered voters/turnout	68,421	47.93		68,421	47.90		

=== By-elections from November 2021 ===
The following by-elections were held to fill vacant ward seats in the period from the election in November 2021.

Date	Ward	Party of the previous councillor	Party of the newly elected councillor
6 Dec 2023	6	African National Congress	African National Congress
15 Oct 2025	7	African National Congress	ActionSA

== November 2026 election ==
The following table shows the results of the 2026 election.

Party	Ward			List			Total seats
Party	Votes	%	Seats	Votes	%	Seats	Total seats
African National Congress	15,926	43.57	18	15,928	43.38	0	18
ActionSA	6,564	17.96	1	6,757	18.40	5	6
Economic Freedom Fighters	3,593	9.83	0	3,521	9.59	3	3
African Independent National Democratic Caucus	2,972	8.13	0	2,931	7.98	3	3
Democratic Alliance	2,014	5.51	0	2,120	5.77	2	2
Freedom Front Plus	1,030	2.82	0	1,069	2.91	1	1
South African Communist Party	864	2.36	0	839	2.29	1	1
United Christian Democratic Party	718	1.96	0	844	2.30	1	1
uMkhonto weSizwe Party	572	1.57	0	570	1.55	1	1
Patriotic Alliance	594	1.63	0	532	1.45	1	1
Labour Party of South Africa	497	1.36	0	465	1.27	0	0
Forum for Democrats	297	0.81	0	292	0.80	0	0
Bophuthatswana Civil Movement	163	0.45	0	300	0.82	0	0
Afrika Mayibuye Movement	169	0.46	0	137	0.37	0	0
African Spear Movement	102	0.28	0	165	0.45	0	0
Independent candidates	259	0.71	0				0
Pan Africanist Congress of Azania	86	0.24	0	96	0.26	0	0
Inkatha Freedom Party	45	0.12	0	100	0.27	0	0
Active African Christians United Movement	61	0.17	0	51	0.14	0	0
Arise Afrika Arise Independent Congress	23	0.06	0				0
Total	36,549	100.00	19	36,717	100.00	18	37
Valid votes	36,549	96.92		36,717	96.57		
Invalid/blank votes	1,160	3.08		1,305	3.43		
Total votes	37,709	100.00		38,022	100.00		
Registered voters/turnout	77,662	48.56		77,662	48.96		
