= Ratlou Local Municipality elections =

Local elections in the North West Province, South Africa

The Ratlou Local Municipality council consists of twenty-seven members elected by mixed-member proportional representation. Fourteen councillors are elected by first-past-the-post voting in fourteen wards, while the remaining thirteen are chosen from party lists so that the total number of party representatives is proportional to the number of votes received.

In the election of 4 November 2026 the African National Congress (ANC) won a majority of fifteen seats.

== Results ==
The following table shows the composition of the council after past elections.

Event	ANC	DA	EFF	FSD	UCDP	Other	Total
2000 election	17	—	—	—	5	—	22
2006 election	20	0	—	—	3	—	23
2011 election	22	1	—	—	3	2	28
2016 election	20	2	2	2	1	0	28
2021 election	19	1	3	3	1	0	27
2026 election	15	1	3	—	1	7	27

== December 2000 election ==
The following table shows the results of the 2000 election.

Party	Ward			List			Total seats
Party	Votes	%	Seats	Votes	%	Seats	Total seats
African National Congress	13,257	76.54	11	13,321	76.75	6	17
United Christian Democratic Party	4,063	23.46	0	4,036	23.25	5	5
Total	17,320	100.00	11	17,357	100.00	11	22
Valid votes	17,320	97.14		17,357	97.18		
Invalid/blank votes	510	2.86		503	2.82		
Total votes	17,830	100.00		17,860	100.00		
Registered voters/turnout	35,398	50.37		35,398	50.45		

== March 2006 election ==
The following table shows the results of the 2006 election.

Party	Ward			List			Total seats
Party	Votes	%	Seats	Votes	%	Seats	Total seats
African National Congress	20,015	84.71	12	19,929	84.67	8	20
United Christian Democratic Party	3,169	13.41	0	3,176	13.49	3	3
Democratic Alliance	443	1.87	0	431	1.83	0	0
Total	23,627	100.00	12	23,536	100.00	11	23
Valid votes	23,627	94.56		23,536	94.28		
Invalid/blank votes	1,359	5.44		1,427	5.72		
Total votes	24,986	100.00		24,963	100.00		
Registered voters/turnout	44,349	56.34		44,349	56.29		

== May 2011 election ==
The following table shows the results of the 2011 election.

Party	Ward			List			Total seats
Party	Votes	%	Seats	Votes	%	Seats	Total seats
African National Congress	19,341	77.49	14	19,631	78.01	8	22
United Christian Democratic Party	2,728	10.93	0	2,716	10.79	3	3
Congress of the People	1,636	6.56	0	1,719	6.83	2	2
Democratic Alliance	1,097	4.40	0	896	3.56	1	1
South African Political Party	156	0.63	0	203	0.81	0	0
Total	24,958	100.00	14	25,165	100.00	14	28
Valid votes	24,958	96.15		25,165	96.83		
Invalid/blank votes	999	3.85		824	3.17		
Total votes	25,957	100.00		25,989	100.00		
Registered voters/turnout	46,722	55.56		46,722	55.62		

== August 2016 election ==
The following table shows the results of the 2016 election.

Party	Ward			List			Total seats
Party	Votes	%	Seats	Votes	%	Seats	Total seats
African National Congress	18,079	69.75	14	18,130	70.21	6	20
Economic Freedom Fighters	2,825	10.90	0	2,860	11.07	3	3
Forum for Service Delivery	1,634	6.30	0	1,302	5.04	2	2
Democratic Alliance	1,457	5.62	0	1,457	5.64	2	2
United Christian Democratic Party	900	3.47	0	1,007	3.90	1	1
Congress of the People	317	1.22	0	607	2.35	0	0
African Christian Democratic Party	331	1.28	0	323	1.25	0	0
Independent candidates	297	1.15	0				0
Inkatha Freedom Party	79	0.30	0	138	0.53	0	0
Total	25,919	100.00	14	25,824	100.00	14	28
Valid votes	25,919	97.47		25,824	96.73		
Invalid/blank votes	673	2.53		873	3.27		
Total votes	26,592	100.00		26,697	100.00		
Registered voters/turnout	49,958	53.23		49,958	53.44		

== November 2021 election ==
The following table shows the results of the 2021 election.

Party	Ward			List			Total seats
Party	Votes	%	Seats	Votes	%	Seats	Total seats
African National Congress	13,443	68.00	14	13,338	67.65	5	19
Economic Freedom Fighters	2,421	12.25	0	2,519	12.78	3	3
Forum for Service Delivery	1,913	9.68	0	1,870	9.48	3	3
Democratic Alliance	819	4.14	0	791	4.01	1	1
United Christian Democratic Party	431	2.18	0	533	2.70	1	1
Forum for Democrats	288	1.46	0	236	1.20	0	0
Freedom Front Plus	140	0.71	0	203	1.03	0	0
Independent candidates	289	1.46	0				0
African Transformation Movement	26	0.13	0	226	1.15	0	0
Total	19,770	100.00	14	19,716	100.00	13	27
Valid votes	19,770	97.44		19,716	97.16		
Invalid/blank votes	520	2.56		577	2.84		
Total votes	20,290	100.00		20,293	100.00		
Registered voters/turnout	47,187	43.00		47,187	43.01		

== November 2026 election ==
The following table shows the results of the 2026 election.

Party	Ward			List			Total seats
Party	Votes	%	Seats	Votes	%	Seats	Total seats
African National Congress	13,986	55.45	14	14,086	56.20	1	15
Economic Freedom Fighters	2,241	8.89	0	2,280	9.10	2	2
South African Communist Party	2,040	8.09	0	1,980	7.90	2	2
Democratic Alliance	1,661	6.59	0	1,727	6.89	2	2
ActionSA	1,499	5.94	0	1,365	5.45	2	2
uMkhonto weSizwe Party	1,125	4.46	0	1,118	4.46	1	1
Patriotic Alliance	587	2.33	0	601	2.40	1	1
African People's Convention	568	2.25	0	497	1.98	1	1
United Christian Democratic Party	514	2.04	0	497	1.98	1	1
African Spear Movement	333	1.32	0	354	1.41	0	0
Afrika Mayibuye Movement	279	1.11	0	247	0.99	0	0
Independent candidates	256	1.02	0				0
Bophuthatswana Civil Movement	40	0.16	0	125	0.50	0	0
Inkatha Freedom Party	60	0.24	0	86	0.34	0	0
African Revolutionary Council	2	0.01	0	90	0.36	0	0
Forum for Democrats	30	0.12	0	10	0.04	0	0
Total	25,221	100.00	14	25,063	100.00	13	27
Valid votes	25,221	96.96		25,063	96.67		
Invalid/blank votes	792	3.04		863	3.33		
Total votes	26,013	100.00		25,926	100.00		
Registered voters/turnout	56,008	46.45		56,008	46.29		
