= Coins of Bophuthatswana =

Bophuthatswana was an independent Bantustan between 1977 and 1994. There were only two coins struck. Both of them were issued in proof coinage only. Bophuthatswana was the only Bantustan to have had their own coins, but the official currency was the South African rand.

== Lowe ==
This piece was struck to commemorate the 10th anniversary of Bophuthatswana's independence in 1987. The obverse of the coin depicts a portrait of the President of Bophuthatswana, Lucas Mangope, who was a Tswana chief in South Africa. The reverse of this coin depicts the Bophuthatswanan Coat-of-Arms. The Lowe, which was issued in proof only, is of .9995 fine platinum. It weighs 31.1 grams (equivalent to 1 Troy ounce).

Catalogue number: X2 (Formerly listed as KMM2).

== Nkwe ==
Like the Lowe, the Nkwe was struck to commemorate the 10th anniversary of Bophuthatswana's independence. The Nkwe has the head of a leopard depicted on the obverse. The Nkwe, which was issued in proof only, is of .917 (or 22 carat) fine gold. It weighs 16.9660 grams (or 1/2 ounce).

Catalogue number: X1 (Formerly listed as KMM1).

== See also ==
- Coins of the South African rand
- Postal orders of Bophuthatswana
