= United Africans Transformation (Lesotho) =

Political party in Lesotho

United Africans Transformation (Lesotho), commonly known as UAT Lesotho, is a political party in Lesotho. It was launched in Maseru in December 2023 as the Lesotho branch of the South African party United Africans Transformation, and has been led since its founding by Mahali Phamotse, a member of parliament and former government minister.

== History ==
United Africans Transformation was originally formed in South Africa and registered with the Electoral Commission of South Africa in November 2022. A Lesotho branch was subsequently established under an interim committee; its members included deputy leader Mojela Mafike, a former Revolution for Prosperity activist.

In late 2023, the Lesotho branch's organisers invited Mahali Phamotse, then the member of parliament for the Matlakeng constituency, to become the party's leader in the country. Phamotse, who had recently been expelled from the governing Revolution for Prosperity, accepted the invitation in a letter dated 3 December 2023 and was introduced as the party's leader in Lesotho at a media briefing in Maseru on 5 December 2023.

== Ideology ==
UAT describes its platform as pursuing "radical economic transformation" intended to expand access to land, food security, and entrepreneurial opportunity for historically disadvantaged communities. In her inaugural address as the Lesotho party's leader, Phamotse said the party would prioritise government service delivery, and cited corruption, unemployment, and abuse of power among the issues it intended to address.

== Leadership ==
- Mahali Phamotse – Leader (December 2023–present)

== Activities ==
=== Russia scholarship programme ===
In January 2025, UAT announced a scholarship programme sending Basotho students to study in Russia through a private partnership with Synergy University in Moscow. The scholarships covered tuition fees of over M35,000 per student, with parents responsible for accommodation and food, across fields including medicine, engineering, agriculture, and information technology. Phamotse said the initiative was intended to provide Basotho students with study and work opportunities and described it as reviving a long-standing history of Basotho studying in Russia dating to before Lesotho's independence.

The programme became the subject of a public dispute with Lesotho's government. Days after the initiative was announced, the Ministry of Foreign Affairs and International Relations, then led by Lejone Mpotjoane, published a statement disputing the programme; Phamotse said the minister had characterised her scholarships as non-existent and had likened the initiative to human trafficking. Phamotse filed a M3 million defamation lawsuit against Mpotjoane in Lesotho's High Court in 2025 over the statements, which she withdrew in April 2026, saying that pursuing the case would have required any damages to be paid from public funds since Mpotjoane had been sued in his official capacity. Mpotjoane's legal team denied the statements were defamatory, saying his remarks had been a general warning about studying abroad rather than being directed specifically at Phamotse.

=== Regional ties ===
UAT Lesotho describes itself as a sister party of the South African United Africans Transformation, led by Bantu Wonder Mahlatsi. In August 2026, Phamotse wrote to Mahlatsi urging the South African party to press for legislative reforms affecting Basotho migrants in South Africa, including easier movement rights and a clearer path to permanent residency for holders of the Lesotho Special Permit.
