= Maquassi Hills Local Municipality elections =

Local elections in the North West Province, South Africa

The Maquassi Hills Local Municipality council consists of twenty-two members elected by mixed-member proportional representation. Eleven councillors are elected by first-past-the-post voting in eleven wards, while the remaining eleven are chosen from party lists so that the total number of party representatives is proportional to the number of votes received.

In the election of 4 November 2026, no party won a majority. The African National Congress (ANC) won the largest number of seats, twelve.

== Results ==
The following table shows the composition of the council after past elections.

Event	ANC	DA	MHG	EFF	FSD	FF+	PAC	Other	Total
2000 election	10	0	3	—	—	—	2	0	15
2006 election	13	1	1	—	—	0	1	0	16
2011 election	17	3	—	—	—	—	—	1	21
2016 election	14	3	—	2	2	1	—	0	22
2021 election	13	2	—	4	1	1	—	1	22
2026 election	12	3	—	4	0	0	—	3	22

== December 2000 election ==
The following table shows the results of the 2000 election.

Party	Ward			List			Total seats
Party	Votes	%	Seats	Votes	%	Seats	Total seats
African National Congress	8,015	61.70	7	8,487	65.15	3	10
Die Maquassi Hills/Rante Gemeenskapsvereniging	2,468	19.00	1	1,954	15.00	2	3
Pan Africanist Congress of Azania	1,577	12.14	0	1,664	12.77	2	2
Democratic Alliance	230	1.77	0	783	6.01	0	0
Independent candidates	618	4.76	0				0
United Christian Democratic Party	82	0.63	0	139	1.07	0	0
Total	12,990	100.00	8	13,027	100.00	7	15
Valid votes	12,990	97.02		13,027	97.08		
Invalid/blank votes	399	2.98		392	2.92		
Total votes	13,389	100.00		13,419	100.00		
Registered voters/turnout	26,151	51.20		26,151	51.31		

== March 2006 election ==
The following table shows the results of the 2006 election.

Party	Ward			List			Total seats
Party	Votes	%	Seats	Votes	%	Seats	Total seats
African National Congress	14,065	81.23	8	13,850	80.98	5	13
Democratic Alliance	823	4.75	0	985	5.76	1	1
Pan Africanist Congress of Azania	891	5.15	0	826	4.83	1	1
Die Maquassi Hills/Rante Gemeenskapsvereniging	835	4.82	0	688	4.02	1	1
Freedom Front Plus	400	2.31	0	403	2.36	0	0
United Christian Democratic Party	302	1.74	0	351	2.05	0	0
Total	17,316	100.00	8	17,103	100.00	8	16
Valid votes	17,316	98.01		17,103	97.01		
Invalid/blank votes	352	1.99		528	2.99		
Total votes	17,668	100.00		17,631	100.00		
Registered voters/turnout	33,460	52.80		33,460	52.69		

== May 2011 election ==
The following table shows the results of the 2011 election.

Party	Ward			List			Total seats
Party	Votes	%	Seats	Votes	%	Seats	Total seats
African National Congress	14,880	76.42	10	15,410	79.82	7	17
Democratic Alliance	2,904	14.91	1	2,883	14.93	2	3
Congress of the People	462	2.37	0	444	2.30	1	1
Independent candidates	747	3.84	0				0
Lebaleng Communist Party	226	1.16	0	343	1.78	0	0
Independent Civic Organisation of South Africa	253	1.30	0	225	1.17	0	0
Total	19,472	100.00	11	19,305	100.00	10	21
Valid votes	19,472	97.21		19,305	96.28		
Invalid/blank votes	558	2.79		745	3.72		
Total votes	20,030	100.00		20,050	100.00		
Registered voters/turnout	35,126	57.02		35,126	57.08		

== August 2016 election ==
The following table shows the results of the 2016 election.

Party	Ward			List			Total seats
Party	Votes	%	Seats	Votes	%	Seats	Total seats
African National Congress	13,465	64.98	10	13,320	64.55	4	14
Democratic Alliance	2,750	13.27	1	2,785	13.50	2	3
Economic Freedom Fighters	2,264	10.93	0	2,285	11.07	2	2
Forum for Service Delivery	1,492	7.20	0	1,467	7.11	2	2
Freedom Front Plus	447	2.16	0	475	2.30	1	1
Lebaleng Communist Party	143	0.69	0	146	0.71	0	0
Patriotic Alliance	32	0.15	0	91	0.44	0	0
United Christian Democratic Party	57	0.28	0	66	0.32	0	0
Independent candidates	72	0.35	0				0
Total	20,722	100.00	11	20,635	100.00	11	22
Valid votes	20,722	96.86		20,635	96.73		
Invalid/blank votes	672	3.14		697	3.27		
Total votes	21,394	100.00		21,332	100.00		
Registered voters/turnout	37,475	57.09		37,475	56.92		

== November 2021 election ==
The following table shows the results of the 2021 election.

Party	Ward			List			Total seats
Party	Votes	%	Seats	Votes	%	Seats	Total seats
African National Congress	10,628	62.70	11	9,877	58.59	2	13
Economic Freedom Fighters	2,616	15.43	0	2,643	15.68	4	4
Democratic Alliance	1,887	11.13	0	1,826	10.83	2	2
South African Political Association	648	3.82	0	786	4.66	1	1
Freedom Front Plus	597	3.52	0	625	3.71	1	1
Forum for Service Delivery	343	2.02	0	318	1.89	1	1
African Independent Congress				552	3.27	0	0
African Freedom Revolution	177	1.04	0	161	0.96	0	0
African Transformation Movement	10	0.06	0	41	0.24	0	0
United Christian Democratic Party	15	0.09	0	28	0.17	0	0
Independent candidates	30	0.18	0				0
Total	16,951	100.00	11	16,857	100.00	11	22
Valid votes	16,951	97.57		16,857	97.28		
Invalid/blank votes	423	2.43		472	2.72		
Total votes	17,374	100.00		17,329	100.00		
Registered voters/turnout	36,602	47.47		36,602	47.34		

=== By-elections from November 2021 ===
The following by-elections were held to fill vacant ward seats in the period since the election in November 2021.

Date	Ward	Party of the previous councillor	Party of the newly elected councillor
27 September 2023	3	African National Congress	Economic Freedom Fighters
4 Dec 2024	5	African National Congress	Democratic Alliance

The African National Congress lost its majority following its by-election defeat to the Democratic Alliance on 4 December 2024.

== November 2026 election ==
The following table shows the results of the 2026 election.

Party	Ward			List			Total seats
Party	Votes	%	Seats	Votes	%	Seats	Total seats
African National Congress	12,011	54.44	10	11,786	53.90	2	12
Economic Freedom Fighters	4,119	18.67	0	4,247	19.42	4	4
Democratic Alliance	2,549	11.55	1	2,466	11.28	2	3
uMkhonto weSizwe Party	676	3.06	0	643	2.94	1	1
ActionSA	583	2.64	0	599	2.74	1	1
All Citizens Party	549	2.49	0	539	2.46	1	1
Freedom Front Plus	478	2.17	0	525	2.40	0	0
South African Communist Party	458	2.08	0	448	2.05	0	0
Matlosana Service Delivery Movement	171	0.78	0	209	0.96	0	0
Patriotic Alliance	126	0.57	0	112	0.51	0	0
African Spear Movement	93	0.42	0	101	0.46	0	0
Afrika Mayibuye Movement	66	0.30	0	62	0.28	0	0
Pan Africanist Congress of Azania	51	0.23	0	58	0.27	0	0
People's Freedom Party	52	0.24	0	42	0.19	0	0
United Christian Democratic Party	47	0.21	0	30	0.14	0	0
Independent candidates	32	0.15	0				0
Total	22,061	100.00	11	21,867	100.00	11	22
Valid votes	22,061	96.90		21,867	96.42		
Invalid/blank votes	706	3.10		813	3.58		
Total votes	22,767	100.00		22,680	100.00		
Registered voters/turnout	42,248	53.89		42,248	53.68		
