= Tswaing Local Municipality elections =

Local elections in the North West Province, South Africa

The Tswaing Local Municipality council consists of twenty-eight members elected by mixed-member proportional representation. Fourteen councillors are elected by first-past-the-post voting in fourteen wards, while the remaining fourteen are chosen from party lists so that the total number of party representatives is proportional to the number of votes received.

In the election of 4 November 2026 the African National Congress (ANC) won a majority of sixteen seats.

== Results ==
The following table shows the composition of the council after past elections.

Event	ANC	DA	EFF	FF+	UCDP	Other	Total
2000 election	20	1	—	—	3	1	25
2006 election	21	2	—	1	1	1	26
2011 election	22	7	—	0	1	0	30
2016 election	20	5	3	1	0	0	29
2021 election	19	4	4	1	0	0	28
2026 election	16	4	3	1	0	4	28

== December 2000 election ==
The following table shows the results of the 2000 election.

Party	Ward			List			Total seats
Party	Votes	%	Seats	Votes	%	Seats	Total seats
African National Congress	15,274	77.07	13	15,369	78.09	7	20
United Christian Democratic Party	2,524	12.74	0	2,394	12.16	3	3
Democratic Alliance	559	2.82	0	1,227	6.23	1	1
Independent candidates	1,118	5.64	0				0
Noordwes Forum	135	0.68	0	428	2.17	1	1
United Democratic Movement	208	1.05	0	262	1.33	0	0
Total	19,818	100.00	13	19,680	100.00	12	25
Valid votes	19,818	96.82		19,680	96.93		
Invalid/blank votes	650	3.18		624	3.07		
Total votes	20,468	100.00		20,304	100.00		
Registered voters/turnout	41,884	48.87		41,884	48.48		

== March 2006 election ==
The following table shows the results of the 2006 election.

Party	Ward			List			Total seats
Party	Votes	%	Seats	Votes	%	Seats	Total seats
African National Congress	19,179	73.18	13	20,040	80.44	8	21
Independent candidates	3,222	12.29	0				0
Democratic Alliance	1,396	5.33	0	1,736	6.97	2	2
United Christian Democratic Party	1,076	4.11	0	1,419	5.70	1	1
Freedom Front Plus	749	2.86	0	961	3.86	1	1
African Christian Democratic Party	535	2.04	0	758	3.04	1	1
United Democratic Movement	52	0.20	0				0
Total	26,209	100.00	13	24,914	100.00	13	26
Valid votes	26,209	97.00		24,914	92.19		
Invalid/blank votes	810	3.00		2,111	7.81		
Total votes	27,019	100.00		27,025	100.00		
Registered voters/turnout	49,854	54.20		49,854	54.21		

== May 2011 election ==
The following table shows the results of the 2011 election.

Party	Ward			List			Total seats
Party	Votes	%	Seats	Votes	%	Seats	Total seats
African National Congress	19,588	72.52	13	20,079	74.51	9	22
Democratic Alliance	5,857	21.68	2	5,881	21.82	5	7
United Christian Democratic Party	450	1.67	0	504	1.87	1	1
Freedom Front Plus	519	1.92	0	262	0.97	0	0
African Christian Democratic Party	217	0.80	0	223	0.83	0	0
Independent candidates	381	1.41	0				0
Total	27,012	100.00	15	26,949	100.00	15	30
Valid votes	27,012	97.39		26,949	97.10		
Invalid/blank votes	723	2.61		806	2.90		
Total votes	27,735	100.00		27,755	100.00		
Registered voters/turnout	50,357	55.08		50,357	55.12		

== August 2016 election ==
The following table shows the results of the 2016 election.

Party	Ward			List			Total seats
Party	Votes	%	Seats	Votes	%	Seats	Total seats
African National Congress	17,180	67.80	15	17,682	68.61	5	20
Democratic Alliance	4,267	16.84	0	4,255	16.51	5	5
Economic Freedom Fighters	2,474	9.76	0	2,392	9.28	3	3
Freedom Front Plus	440	1.74	0	372	1.44	1	1
Congress of the People	310	1.22	0	259	1.00	0	0
United Christian Democratic Party	255	1.01	0	290	1.13	0	0
Forum for Service Delivery	122	0.48	0	230	0.89	0	0
African People's Convention	99	0.39	0	158	0.61	0	0
African Christian Democratic Party	41	0.16	0	99	0.38	0	0
Independent candidates	136	0.54	0				0
Agang South Africa	15	0.06	0	35	0.14	0	0
Total	25,339	100.00	15	25,772	100.00	14	29
Valid votes	25,339	97.43		25,772	97.19		
Invalid/blank votes	669	2.57		745	2.81		
Total votes	26,008	100.00		26,517	100.00		
Registered voters/turnout	51,737	50.27		51,737	51.25		

== November 2021 election ==
The following table shows the results of the 2021 election.

Party	Ward			List			Total seats
Party	Votes	%	Seats	Votes	%	Seats	Total seats
African National Congress	13,205	64.41	14	13,140	65.51	5	19
Economic Freedom Fighters	2,600	12.68	0	2,810	14.01	4	4
Democratic Alliance	2,585	12.61	0	2,549	12.71	4	4
Freedom Front Plus	574	2.80	0	608	3.03	1	1
Independent candidates	1,082	5.28	0				0
Forum for Service Delivery	221	1.08	0	250	1.25	0	0
Congress of the People	18	0.09	0	419	2.09	0	0
United Christian Democratic Party	116	0.57	0	159	0.79	0	0
Africa Restoration Alliance	100	0.49	0	124	0.62	0	0
Total	20,501	100.00	14	20,059	100.00	14	28
Valid votes	20,501	97.74		20,059	95.65		
Invalid/blank votes	473	2.26		913	4.35		
Total votes	20,974	100.00		20,972	100.00		
Registered voters/turnout	48,900	42.89		48,900	42.89		

== November 2026 election ==
The following table shows the results of the 2026 election.

Party	Ward			List			Total seats
Party	Votes	%	Seats	Votes	%	Seats	Total seats
African National Congress	13,952	56.64	14	13,932	56.44	2	16
Democratic Alliance	3,575	14.51	0	3,662	14.84	4	4
Economic Freedom Fighters	2,092	8.49	0	2,249	9.11	3	3
ActionSA	1,295	5.26	0	1,253	5.08	2	2
South African Communist Party	1,318	5.35	0	1,200	4.86	1	1
uMkhonto weSizwe Party	960	3.90	0	907	3.67	1	1
Freedom Front Plus	729	2.96	0	706	2.86	1	1
African Spear Movement	310	1.26	0	295	1.20	0	0
Inkatha Freedom Party	109	0.44	0	128	0.52	0	0
Afrika Mayibuye Movement	125	0.51	0	95	0.38	0	0
United Christian Democratic Party	103	0.42	0	100	0.41	0	0
African Revolutionary Council	25	0.10	0	99	0.40	0	0
All Citizens Party	40	0.16	0	57	0.23	0	0
Total	24,633	100.00	14	24,683	100.00	14	28
Valid votes	24,633	97.72		24,683	97.69		
Invalid/blank votes	574	2.28		583	2.31		
Total votes	25,207	100.00		25,266	100.00		
Registered voters/turnout	55,690	45.26		55,690	45.37		
