= 1977 Bophuthatswana parliamentary election =

Parliamentary elections were held in Bophuthatswana between 22 and 24 August 1977. The Bophuthatswana Democratic Party won 43 of the 48 elected seats in the National Assembly.

== Electoral system ==
The National Assembly had a total of 96 seats, 48 of which were appointed and 48 elected.

== Results ==
Party	Seats		
Party	Elected	Appointed	Total
Bophuthatswana Democratic Party	43	47	90
National Seoposengwe Party	5	1	6
Total	48	48	96
Source: African Elections Database
