= 1982 Bophuthatswana parliamentary election =

Parliamentary elections were held in Bophuthatswana in October 1982. The Bophuthatswana Democratic Party won all 72 of the elected seats in the National Assembly.

== Results ==
Party	Seats
Bophuthatswana Democratic Party	72
Total	72
Source: African Elections Database
