= Sipho Mfundisi =

South African politician (born 1948)

Member of the National Assembly
- In office 25 January 2012 – 6 May 2014
- In office June 1999 – May 2009

Personal details
- Born: Isaac Sipho Mfundisi; 2 October 1948 (age 77)
- Citizenship: South Africa
- Party: United Christian Democratic Party

Isaac Sipho Mfundisi (born 2 October 1948) is a South African politician who represented the United Christian Democratic Party (UCDP) in the National Assembly from 1999 to 2009 and from 2012 to 2014. He is also a former president of the UCDP.

== Political career ==
Born on 2 October 1948, Mfundisi joined Parliament after the 1999 general election, in which he was narrowly elected to a UCDP seat in the National Assembly. He served two consecutive terms, gaining re-election in 2004, and during that time served as spokesman for the UCDP.

Mfundisi was not re-elected to his seat in the 2009 general election, but he remained in office as chairperson of the UCDP. During the legislative term that followed, he was promoted to UCDP deputy president and then, after incumbent party president Mavis Matladi died in November 2011, to UCDP president. During his presidency, the party was involved in a legal battle with its founder, Lucas Mangope, who demanded to be reinstated to the leadership.

Mfundisi also returned to the National Assembly; he was sworn in on 25 January 2012 to fill the seat formerly held by Matladi. In the next general election in 2014, he ran for re-election, ranked first on the UCDP's party list, but the party failed to win any seats in the chamber.
