= 1972 Bophuthatswana legislative election =

Parliamentary elections were held in Bophuthatswana on 4 October 1972. The Bophuthatswana National Party led by Lucas Mangope won 20 of the 24 elected seats in the Legislative Assembly.

== Electoral system ==
Voters registered themselves by having their reference book stamped, at which time they also chose which polling station they wanted to vote at, as well as which constituency that they wanted to vote in. However, as the reference books were used by the Apartheid authorities in South Africa, the Chief Electoral Officer issued a statement that Tswana living illegally in Soweto would not be transferred to Bophuthatswana if they registered.

The 24 elected seats in the Assembly were elected in 12 two-member constituencies, whilst a further 48 members were appointed.

== Campaign ==
Two parties were formed prior to the elections; Tidimane Pilane established the Seoposengwe Party in July 1972, whilst Mangope founded the Bophuthatswana National Party (BNP) in August. The Seoposengwe Party's manifesto accepted the concept of separate development, although "only for the implied promises of handing us both our homeland Forefathers' land and particularly for the promise of granting Bophuthatswana its ultimate Sovereign Independence." It opposed the Tswana University proposed by Mangope and called for a focus on adult literacy and free and compulsory education. The party also called for control over mining in the territory, as well as a wholly elected Assembly.

The BNP manifesto proposed only allowing citizens to qualify for trading rights in the territory and that the government should receive all taxes paid by mining companies. It also called for chiefs to be involved in the territory's politics (according to the constitution, only chiefs could become government ministers), noting "We have been severely criticized for the large number of designated members [in the assembly], but we believe we must lead our people from what they know to what they do not know—for the concept of a general election is unknown in our traditional administration."

Only eight of the 12 constituencies were contested. A total of 39 candidates ran for the 16 contested seats, of whom 17 lost their deposits.

== Results ==
Party	Votes	%	Seats
Bophuthatswana National Party	268,000	72.47	20
Seoposengwe Party	101,800	27.53	4
Appointed members			48
Total	369,800	100.00	72
Valid votes	369,800	92.45	
Invalid/blank votes	30,200	7.55	
Total votes	400,000	100.00	
Registered voters/turnout	800,000	50.00	
Source: African Elections Database, Butler et al.

Urban areas saw a low turnout (just 15% in Pretoria compared to 45% in rural areas) a factor which favoured the Bophuthatswana National Party.
