= Mahlatsi =

Mahlatsi is a surname. Notable people with the surname include:

- Kamohelo Mahlatsi (born 1998), South African football player
- Wonder Mahlatsi (fl. from 2014), South African politician
