= 1987 Bophuthatswana parliamentary election =

Parliamentary elections were held in Bophuthatswana on 22 October 1987. The Bophuthatswana Democratic Party won 66 of the 72 of the elected seats in the National Assembly.

== Electoral system ==
The National Assembly had a total of 102 seats, 72 of which were elected and 30 of which were appointed.

== Results ==
Party	Seats	+/–
Bophuthatswana Democratic Party	66	–6
Progressive People's Party	6	New
Appointed members	30	–
Total	102	0
Source: African Elections Database
