= Rocky Malebane-Metsing =

South African politician

- Born: Peter Ishmael Rocky Malebana-Metsing; 23 August 1949; Rustenburg, Union of South Africa
- Died: 23 November 2016 (aged 67); South Africa
- Occupation: politician
- Known for: member, African National Congress

Peter Ishmael Rocky Malebana-Metsing (23 August 1949 – 23 November 2016) was a South African politician who was a member of the African National Congress in the 1990s.

He was born in Rustenburg. In 1988, a coup ousted Lucas Mangope, the president of Bophuthatswana, and installed Malebane-Metsing, who at the time was leader of the Progressive People's Party, as president. Fifteen hours later, the South African government sent troops in and reinstated Mangope. In December 1991 Rocky Malebana-Metsing was elected into the National Executive Committee (NEC) of the ANC. After the 1994 elections, he was appointed MEC for Agriculture in North West Province of South Africa, but he resigned from the ANC, and consequently lost his seat on 16 May 1995, after political differences.

In 2006, he made his comeback into mainstream politics. He was elected into the Rustenburg local municipality, where he held several strategic positions. In 2014, he was removed from the MMC position of Infrastructure in Rustenburg Municipality

His son Rycroft Khumo Malebane-Metsing was elected North West province treasurer of the Young Communist League, but was involved in a motor vehicle accident a few hours later.

In June 2016, Malebane-Metsing left the ANC once again after serious impositions of leaders against the choices of people towards 3 August 2016 South African local municipality elections. He joined the Forum for Service Delivery, and stood unsuccessfully as mayoral candidate for Rustenburg. He died on 23 November 2016, aged 67.
