= Lefatshe leno la bo-rrarona =

National anthem of Bophuthatswana

English: This Land of Our Forefathers
- National anthem of Bophuthatswana
- Lyrics: J.M. Ntsime
- Music: E.B. Mathibe; J.J. Loots
- Adopted: 1977
- Relinquished: 27 April 1994

"Lefatshe leno la bo-rrarona" was the national anthem of Bophuthatswana, one of the black homelands in South Africa established under apartheid. The lyrics were written by J M Ntsime, a famous Setswana novelist, dramatist and minister of education of Bophuthatswana. The vocal version could often be heard at the sign-on and sign-off of Bop TV, the official television station of Bophuthatswana.

== Lyrics ==
Setswana

1. Lefatshe leno la borrarona
Re le abetswe ke Modimo
Kwa ntle ga tshololo ya madi
A re lebogeng, a re ipepleng
A re lebogeng, a re ipepleng

2. Lefatshe leno la borrarona
Re le abela matshelo a rona
Re tla le fufulelwa
Sethitho se fetoga madi, sethitho se fetoga madi

3. Lefasthe la kgomo le mabele
Boswa jwa rona ka bosakhutleng
Ramasedi a ledibele
Re tshele mo go llona, ka pabalesego

4. Modimo tshegofatsa fatshe le
Go rene kagiso le kutlwano
Tshegofatsa Setshaba sa rona
Le yona puso ya rona
Go ntsha maungo a a tshedisang

Afrikaans

1. Hierdie land van ons Voorvaders
Dit is deur God aan ons gegee
Sonder bloedvergieting
Laat ons dankbaar wees en bly wees
Laat ons dankbaar wees en bly wees

2. Hierdie land van ons Voorvaders
Ons belowe ons lewe daaraan
Ons sal daarvoor arbei
Tot die sweet in bloed verander
Tot die sweet in bloed verander

3. Hierdie land van beeste en mielies
Ons blywende erfenis
Mag God dit gepas beskerm
Dat ons veilig daarin kan woon
Dat ons veilig daarin kan woon

4. God seën ons land
Dat vrede en harmonie mag heers
God seën ons Regering en nasie
Dat ons met goeie gesondheid lewegewende vrugte kan voortbring.
Dat ons met goeie gesondheid lewegewende vrugte kan voortbring.

English translation

1. This land of our Forefathers
It is given to us by God
Without shedding of blood
Let us give thanks, and rejoice
Let us give thanks, and rejoice

2. This land of our Forefathers
We pledge our lives to it
We shall labour for it
Till the sweat turns to blood
Till the sweat turns to blood

3. This land of cattle and corn
Our lasting heritage
May God safeguard it fittingly
That we may live in it safely
That we may live in it safely

4. God bless our land
That peace and harmony may reign
God bless our Government and nation
That in good health we may produce lifegiving fruits.
That in good health we may produce lifegiving fruits.
