= Lehurutshe =

- Location within North West (South African province) Location within South Africa
- Coordinates: 25.488°S 25.974°E
- Country: South Africa
- Province: North West
- District: Ngaka Modiri Molema
- Municipality: Ramotshere Moiloa

Area
  - Total: 23.11 km^{2} (8.92 sq mi)

Population (2011)
  - Total: 6,888
  - Density: 298.1/km^{2} (772.0/sq mi)

Racial makeup (2011)
  - Black African: 98.6%
  - Coloured: 0.6%
  - Indian/Asian: 0.5%
  - White: 0.2%
  - Other: 0.1%

First languages (2011)
  - Tswana: 87.2%
  - English: 6.4%
  - Zulu: 1.6%
  - S. Ndebele: 1.1%
  - Other: 3.7%
- Time zone: UTC+2 (SAST)
- Postal code (street): 2880
- PO box: 2880

Lehurutshe (formerly known as Welbedacht) is a town in Ngaka Modiri Molema District Municipality in the North West province of South Africa. The town has within its vicinity the Lehurutshe campus of Taletso TVET, a fire station and numerous schools.

Lehurutshe District Hospital is located in the town, and serves the surrounding villages of Dinokana, Khunotswane, Madutle, Matlhase, Radikhudu, Gopane, Motswedi, Borakalalo, Driefontein, Lobatla, Moshana, Supingstad and Ntsweletsoku.
