= Mahali Phamotse =

Lesotho politician

Leader of the United Africans Transformation (Lesotho)
- Incumbent
- Assumed office 5 December 2023
- Preceded by: Position established

Member of the National Assembly of Lesotho for Matlakeng
- Incumbent
- Assumed office 2022

Minister of Gender and Youth, Sports and Recreation
- In office 2017–2022

Minister of Justice and Correctional Services
- In office 2016–2017

Minister of Education and Training
- In office 2015–2017

Personal details
- Born: 1969 (age 56–57) Ha Shepheseli, Lesotho
- Party: United Africans Transformation
- Other political affiliations: Democratic Congress; Alliance of Democrats; Revolution for Prosperity
- Education: National University of Lesotho

Dr. Mahali Phamotse (born 1969) is a Mosotho politician. She is the member of Lesotho's National Assembly for the Matlakeng constituency and has held several cabinet portfolios, including Minister of Education and Training and Minister of Justice and Correctional Services. In 2023 she was expelled from the governing Revolution for Prosperity (RFP) party, but retained her constituency seat, and subsequently became the leader of the Lesotho branch of United Africans Transformation (UAT).

== Early life and education ==
Phamotse was born in Ha Shepheseli, Lesotho, in 1969. Before entering politics, she worked as a schoolteacher and later lectured at the Lesotho College of Education and the National University of Lesotho.

== Political career ==
=== Early career and 2015 election ===
Phamotse entered electoral politics in 2015 as a Democratic Congress (DC) candidate for the Matlakeng constituency. She narrowly lost the general election but entered the National Assembly through a proportional-representation seat and was appointed Minister of Education and Training in the coalition government formed after the election. She later served as Minister of Justice and Correctional Services, and by 2017 also held the Ministry of Gender and Youth, Sports and Recreation while representing the Alliance of Democrats. Independent press coverage from the period confirms she held the gender, youth and sports portfolio, including a 2019 report on a FIFA presidential visit to Lesotho.

=== Matlakeng MP and expulsion from the RFP ===
Phamotse won the Matlakeng constituency seat for the Revolution for Prosperity at the 2022 Lesotho general election. In August 2023, she and two other RFP MPs, Thuso Makhalanyane and Rethabile Letlailana, were suspended from the party for six years after voting with opposition parties in parliament. Phamotse and Makhalanyane challenged the suspension in Lesotho's High Court. The RFP's national executive committee formally expelled the three MPs at a party conference on 30 September 2023; Phamotse said she believed she was also targeted for inviting opposition leaders to a celebration in her constituency. Because she held the seat as a directly elected constituency MP rather than through a party-list proportional representation seat, her expulsion from the RFP did not affect her membership of parliament, and she has continued to sit as Matlakeng's MP since.

=== 2020 corruption charges ===
In February 2020, Phamotse was charged with corruption alongside her former Principal Secretary, Mapaseka Kolotsane, and former Deputy Principal Secretary, Ratšiu Majara, in connection with the Ministry of Education and Training's 2015 tender for high-school textbooks and teachers' guides. Prosecutors allege that, while serving as Minister of Education and Training, she acted together with Kolotsane and Majara to improperly influence the awarding of the tender to Epic Printers and Molumeli (Pty) Ltd, including by amending the bid document's experience requirements. The case, prosecuted under Lesotho's Prevention of Corruption and Economic Offences Act, has faced repeated delays over discovery and pre-trial procedure; as of the most recent reporting it had not gone to trial and was scheduled for a hearing in August 2026, more than six years after charges were filed.

=== Leader of UAT Lesotho ===
Following her expulsion, former RFP activists who had registered a Lesotho branch of the South African party United Africans Transformation invited Phamotse to lead it. She accepted in a letter dated 3 December 2023 and was introduced as the party's leader at a media briefing in Maseru on 5 December 2023.

=== Russia scholarship programme and defamation suit ===
In January 2025, Phamotse announced a UAT-sponsored programme to send Basotho students to study in Russia, through a partnership between the party and Synergy University in Moscow. The scholarships covered tuition fees of over M35,000 per student, with parents responsible for accommodation and food, and were offered across fields including medicine, engineering, agriculture, and information technology. Phamotse described the programme as reviving a long-standing history of Basotho studying in Russia dating to before Lesotho's independence. The programme prompted a public dispute with the Ministry of Foreign Affairs and International Relations, then led by Lejone Mpotjoane, whom Phamotse said had publicly compared the initiative to human trafficking. She sued Mpotjoane for M3 million in defamation damages in 2025, then withdrew the suit in April 2026, saying she did not want damages paid from public funds since he had been sued in his official capacity; Mpotjoane's legal team denied defaming her, saying his remarks were a general warning about studying abroad rather than being directed at her specifically. Despite the dispute, Phamotse maintained that the programme proceeded, with students travelling to Russia after following normal procedures, and that a subsequent radio interview saw Mpotjoane acknowledge no procedural flaws in the initiative.

=== Other activities ===
In September 2025, Phamotse personally sponsored a M5.4 million, three-year package for Lesotho's third-tier B Division football league, in recognition of which the league was renamed the Dr Mahali Phamotse B Division League. In August 2026, as UAT leader, she petitioned the South African UAT's leader, Bantu Wonder Mahlatsi, to press for legislative changes affecting Basotho migrants in South Africa, including easier movement rights and clearer permanent-residency pathways for holders of the Lesotho Special Permit.
