= New Power =

New Power may refer to:

- New Power (company), Chinese company, a subsidiary of Zotye
- New Power Party, political party in Taiwan
- Bharatiya Navshakti Party (Indian New Power Party), an Indian political party
- New Power (book), a 2018 book by Jeremy Heimans and Henry Timms

== See also ==
- New Force (disambiguation)
