= Progressive Caucus (South Africa) =

Political alliance in South Africa

- Abbreviation: PC
- Leaders: Julius Malema (EFF); Jacob Zuma (MK); Vuyolwethu Zungula (ATM); Wonder Mahlatsi (UAT)
- Founded: 13 June 2024
- Ideology: Majority: Left-wing populism
- Political position: Majority: Left-wing to far-left
- Member parties: EFF; MK Party; ATM; UAT; Formerly: UDM; Al Jama-ah; PAC
- National Assembly: 100 / 400
- National Council of Provinces: 11 / 90
- Pan-African Parliament: 1 / 5 (South African seats)
- Provincial Legislatures: 111 / 487

The Progressive Caucus (PC) is a political alliance in the Parliament of South Africa, which formed in opposition to the Government of National Unity (GNU).

At its height it comprised seven parties: the Economic Freedom Fighters (EFF), Al Jama-ah, United Democratic Movement (UDM), United Africans Transformation (UAT), African Transformation Movement (ATM), the Pan Africanist Congress of Azania (PAC), and the uMkhonto we Sizwe (MK) party. However, within a matter of days the PAC, UDM, and Al Jama-ah parties would leave Progressive Caucus and join the GNU on 19, 21 and 23 June, 2024 respectively. The Progressive Caucus collectively holds approximately 25% of the seats in the National Assembly.

The MK party, led by former president Jacob Zuma, joined the Progressive Caucus on 17 June after securing 14.6% of the vote and 58 seats in the National Assembly in the 2024 elections. MK's surprising performance solidified its position as the third-largest party in parliament.

Despite initially boycotting the first sitting of the National Assembly over allegations of vote-rigging—which the court dismissed as without merit—MK decided to align with the Progressive Caucus to strengthen the opposition against the GNU. However, the inclusion of the MK does not gain the Progressive Caucus enough seats in the National Assembly to block any law or constitutional amendment due to the GNU's supermajority.

The caucus was formed following the 29 May 2024 elections where the ANC lost its majority for the first time in 30 years. The ANC, which won 40% of the vote, entered a coalition with the DA and other smaller parties to form a GNU. In contrast, the Progressive Caucus aims to provide a fiscally left-leaning alternative to this coalition.

Counter to its name, the Progressive Caucus is not unified around left-leaning social policies, nor are its parties progressivist in their ideologies. The Caucus even includes some member parties who advocate for right-wing social positions, such as the reintroduction of the death penalty and the repeal of same-sex marriage laws.

== Objectives ==
The Progressive Caucus seeks to advance radical economic transformation and the policy of land appropriation without compensation. They view the presence of the DA and the Freedom Front Plus (FF+) in the GNU as being opposed to these principles, describing it as an alliance rooted in colonialism and apartheid.

== Recent developments ==
In June 2024, the Progressive Caucus offered the ANC an opportunity to form a government without the DA and the Freedom Front Plus (FF+). This offer fell through as the ANC proceeded to form a Government of National Unity together with various parties, including the DA and FF+. The UAT rejoined the Progressive Caucus after leaving the government due to frustration over not receiving any ministries.

== Challenges ==
The Progressive Caucus has faced exclusion from significant GNU discussions, leading to calls for a more inclusive and meaningful engagement process with the ANC. The EFF, a leading member of the caucus, has been particularly vocal about this exclusion, emphasising the need for a collaborative approach that respects the contributions of all parties involved. The EFF has refused the possibility that it will join the GNU if the DA or FF+ are included.

== Criticism ==
Some commentators have taken the view that the name Progressive Caucus is a misleading self-designation since the parties forming part of it do not necessarily endorse traditionally progressive policies. For example a legal commentator, writing under a pseudonym, implied that the parties considering themselves part of the caucus are not progressive in nature and wrote that it is "a coalition of populists, ethno-nationalists and other opportunistic rent-seekers".
