= Bophuthatswana =

Bantustan in South Africa (1977–1994)

Coordinates: 25.8000°S 25.5500°E

Republic of Bophuthatswana Repaboleki ya Bophuthatswana (Tswana) Republiek van Bophuthatswana (Afrikaans)
- 1977–1994
- Flag Coat of arms
- Motto: "Tshwaraganang Lo Dire Pula E Ne" (Tswana) "If we stand together and work hard we will be blessed with rain" (Note: Bophuthatswana at Flags of the World.)
- Anthem: Lefatshe leno la bo-rrarona (Note: Constitution of the Republic of Bophuthatswana as amended in 1984, Schedule 1.) (Tswana); This Land of our Forefathers
- Location of Bophuthatswana (red) within South Africa (beige).
- Status: Bantustan (de facto) puppet state of Apartheid South Africa
- Capital: Mmabatho
- Official languages: Tswana; English; Afrikaans
- President
  - 1977–1994: Lucas Mangope (BNP and BDP)
  - 1988 (disputed): Rocky Malebane-Metsing (PPP)
  - 1994: Tjaart van der Walt (Independent) and Job Mokgoro (ANC)
- Legislature: Parliament
  - Parliament: President and National Assembly
  - National Assembly (Note: ibid., Chapter 5.): 24 regional representatives (Note: Appointed.); 12 non-voting specialists (Note: Appointed.) (Note: With or without citizenship.); 72 elected MPs
- History
  - Self-government: 1 June 1972
  - Nominal Independence: 6 December 1977
  - Coup d'état: 10 February 1988
  - Coup attempt: 1990
  - 1994 Bophuthatswana crisis: 9–11 March 1994
  - Dissolution: 27 April 1994

Area
- 1980: 44,109 km^{2} (17,031 sq mi)

Population
  - 1980: 1,323,315
  - 1991: 1,478,950
- Currency: South African rand
| Preceded by | Succeeded by |
| Republic of South Africa (1961–1984) | South Africa |

Bophuthatswana (/ˌboʊpuːtətˈswɑːnə/, lit. 'gathering of the Tswana people'), officially the Republic of Bophuthatswana (Tswana: Repaboleki ya Bophuthatswana; Afrikaans: Republiek van Bophuthatswana), colloquially referred to as the Bop and by outsiders as Jigsawland (In reference to its enclave-ridden borders) was a Bantustan (also known as "Homeland", an area set aside for members of a specific ethnicity) that was declared (nominally) independent by the apartheid regime of South Africa in 1977. However, like the other Bantustans of Ciskei, Transkei and Venda, its independence was not recognized by any country other than South Africa.

Bophuthatswana was the second Bantustan to be declared an independent state by the Apartheid government, after Transkei. Its territory constituted a scattered patchwork of enclaves spread across what was then Cape Province, Orange Free State and Transvaal. Its seat of government was Mmabatho, which is now a suburb of Mahikeng.

On 27 April 1994, it was reintegrated into South Africa with the coming into force of the country's interim constitution. Its territory was distributed between the new provinces of the Free State, Gauteng, Mpumalanga and North West Province.

== History ==
=== Establishment ===
The area comprising former native reserves was set up as the only homeland for Tswana-speaking people in 1961 and administered by the Tswana Territorial Authority. It was given nominal self-rule in 1971, and elections were held the following year.

Following the 1977 elections, Chief Lucas Mangope became the first president after his Bophuthatswana Democratic Party won a majority of seats.

=== Independence and international reaction ===
The territory became nominally independent on 6 December 1977. Bophuthatswana's independence was not recognized by any government other than those of South Africa and Transkei, the first homeland to gain nominal independence. In addition, it was later internally recognized by the two additional countries within the TBVC-system, Ciskei and Venda.

[A]t last we are no longer helplessly at the mercy of the arbitrary arrogance of those who until this hour trampled our human dignity into the dust.

— - Lucas Mangope

The General Assembly denounces the declaration of the so-called "independence" ... of Bophuthatswana ... and declares [it] totally invalid.

— - United Nations General Assembly

Arguing in favour of independence, President Mangope claimed that the move would enable its population to negotiate with Pretoria from a stronger position: "We would rather face the difficulties of administering a fragmented territory, the wrath of the outside world, and accusations of ill-informed people. It's the price we are prepared to pay for being masters of our own destiny."

United Nations Secretary-General Kurt Waldheim stated that he "strongly deplored" the establishment of "another so-called independent tribal homeland in pursuance of the discredited policies of apartheid", and in resolution A/RES/32/105N, passed on 14 December 1977, the United Nations General Assembly linked Bophuthatswana's "so-called 'independence'" to South Africa's "stubborn pursuit" of its policies, and called upon all governments to "deny any form of recognition to the so-called 'independent' bantustans".

During a parliamentary debate in the UK on 6 December 1977, Foreign Secretary David Owen replied in the negative when asked "whether Her Majesty's Government intend to recognise travel documents issued by the authorities of ... Bophuthatswana for the purpose of admitting visitors to the United Kingdom".

While the majority of news reports echoed these official declarations, there were others which opined that Western critics should "suspend judgment for a time", and despite its generally critical stance on South Africa's policies, Time magazine wrote that Bophuthatswana had "considerable economic potential" with an expected $30 million a year coming from mining revenues.

Despite its official isolation, however, the government in Mmabatho managed to set up a trade mission in Tel Aviv, Israel, and conducted some business with neighbouring Botswana in an effort to sway attitudes; furthermore, Botswana agreed on "informal arrangements" short of official recognition in order to facilitate cross-border travel.

Bophuthatswana maintained an unofficial embassy in Israel during the 1980s, located next to the British embassy in Tel Aviv. The Israeli Foreign Ministry objected to the embassy's presence, as Israel did not recognize Bophuthatswana as a country. The Bantustan's president, Lucas Mangope, was nevertheless able to meet with prominent figures such as Moshe Dayan during visits to Israel.

In the 1982 elections, the Democratic Party won all 72 elected seats. It also won a large majority in the 1987 elections.

=== Series of coups d'état ===
On 10 February 1988, Rocky Malebane-Metsing of the People's Progressive Party (PPP) became the president of Bophuthatswana for one day when he took over the government through a military coup. He accused Mangope of corruption and charged that the recent election had been rigged in the government's favour. A statement by the defence force said "serious and disturbing matters of great concern" had emerged, citing Mangope's close association with a multimillionaire Israeli Soviet émigré Shabtai Kalmanovich.

Subsequently, the South African Defence Force invaded Bophuthatswana and Mangope was reinstated and continued his term unabated. P. W. Botha, State President of South Africa at the time, justified the reinstatement by saying that "[t]he South African Government is opposed in principle to the obtaining or maintaining of power by violence."

In 1990, a second coup attempt took place in which an estimated 50,000 protesters demanded the President's resignation over his handling of the economy. The New York Times reported that seven people had been killed and 450 wounded "after police officers in armoured cars fired their rifles into the crowds and used tear gas and rubber bullets".

After Mangope had asked for help from the South African government, he declared a state of emergency and cut telephone links to the territory "for political reasons", claiming that "normal laws had become inadequate". Human Rights Watch put the number of protesters at 150,000.

=== Crisis of 1994 ===
In the beginning of 1994 with South Africa heading for democratic elections, President Lucas Mangope resisted the elections taking place in Bophuthatswana and opposed reincorporation of the territory into South Africa. This resulted in increasing unrest and 40 people were wounded when Bophuthatswana Defence Force troops opened fire on striking civil servants. Mangope took an increasingly hardline stance, rejected Independent Electoral Commission chairman Judge Johann Kriegler's plea for free political activity in the territory, and fired the staff of the Bophuthatswana Broadcasting Corporation, closing down two television stations and three radio stations.

In March 1994, with unrest growing and rumors of ANC supporters massing at Bophuthatswana's borders, Mangope invited General Constand Viljoen, head of the right-wing Afrikaner Volksfront, to immediately assist in keeping the peace. The Afrikaners were hastily rallied and mobilised, including the white supremacist group Afrikaner Weerstandsbeweging (AWB), which took the opportunity to move in and try to restore the apartheid status quo. Uniformed members of the AWB on an armed incursion to the Mmabatho/Mafikeng area shot at unarmed civilians blocking the road, injuring and killing many.

They themselves were shot at by members of the Bophuthatswana Defence Force (BDF) and the Police and were forced to retreat. Some members of the AWB travelling in a blue Mercedes Benz shot at people along the road; members of the Bophuthatswana Police then fired at the car. The driver, Nicolaas Fourie, and his two passengers promptly surrendered and were disarmed. After the media were allowed to photograph the badly injured prisoners, they were then executed at point-blank range by a Bophuthatswana policeman, Ontlametse Bernstein Menyatswe. These killings effectively spelt the end of white right-wing military opposition to democratic reforms.

On 12 March 1994, Mangope was deposed as President of Bophuthatswana by the South African government and the Transitional Executive Council. South African Ambassador to Bophuthatswana, Prof. Tjaart van der Walt, was then appointed as the territory's new administrator.

=== Dissolution ===
With the end of apartheid after the first multi-racial elections and the coming into force of the Interim Constitution of South Africa on 27 April 1994, Bophuthatswana ceased to exist and once again became part of South Africa.

The majority of the country became part of the North West province, while the Thaba 'Nchu district became part of the Free State, and the Mathanjana exclave north-east of Pretoria became part of Mpumalanga. The capital, Mmabatho, was merged with Mafikeng and the combined city is now the capital of the North-West province.

== Geography ==
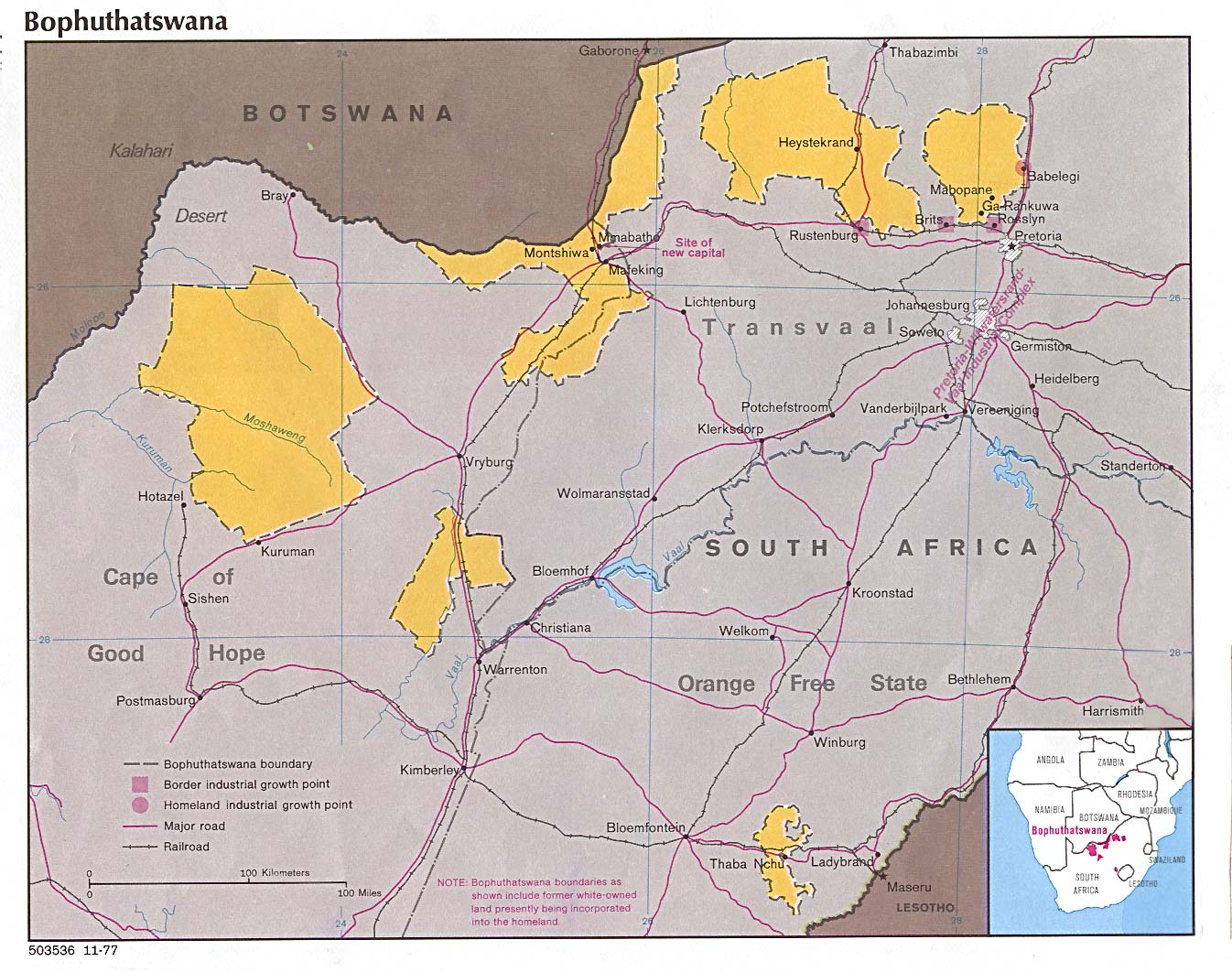
Bophuthatswana in 1977

Map of Bophuthatswana showing districts and border changes

=== Territory ===
Bophuthatswana had a surface area of approximately 40,000 km^{2} (15,000 sq mi) and consisted of seven enclaves dispersed over the former South African provinces of Cape Province, Transvaal, and Orange Free State. Six of the enclaves were located relatively close together with three in the Cape Province and another three in Transvaal. The seventh enclave was in the Orange Free State between Bloemfontein and the Lesotho border.

One of the enclaves shared a border with Botswana, while two of the enclaves were located near Pretoria and its surrounding industrial areas. The townships in these enclaves, such as Ga-Rankuwa and Mabopane continued to serve as dormitory townships for the supply of labour (as they had done prior to Bophuthatswana's independence) despite being located in Bophuthatswana territory. Other enclaves were similarly located near South African cities such as Rustenburg and Bloemfontein.

The capital, Mmabatho, was situated in the enclave bordering Botswana.

The territory and borders of the country were fluid as the South African government frequently incorporated territory into the country. As a result, when independence was declared in 1977, the country originally consisted of six enclaves but just before its reincorporation into South Africa, it had seven enclaves. Another example was the incorporation of Mafeking, which was located just outside the borders of Bophuthatswana when it gained independence in 1977, into the country in 1980 after a local referendum.

=== Districts and cities ===
Districts of Bophuthatswana and their population in 1991 were:

- Odi: 354,782
- Moretele: 235,540
- Tlhaping-Tlharo: 101,425
- Ditsobotla: 135,045
- Molopo: 128,383
- Mankwe: 89,841
- Bafokeng: 88,399
- Taung: 134,277
- Thaba 'Nchu: 49,053
- Lehurutshe: 62,901
- Madikwe: 52,268
- Ganyesa: 47,036

Major cities and towns in Bophuthatswana included:

- Ga-Rankuwa
- Mabopane
- Mafikeng
- Mmabatho – the capital
- Mogwase
- Temba
- Tlhabane

== Demographics ==
The homeland was set up to house Setswana-speaking peoples. In 1983, it had more than 1,430,000 inhabitants; in 1990, it had an estimated population of 2,352,296. Only 10% of Bophuthatswana's total land area was arable, and much of that was covered with scrub bush.

Though the majority of its population was Tswana-speaking, Tswana, English, and Afrikaans were all designated as official languages by the Constitution of Bophuthatswana.

== Economy ==
Bophuthatswana was the richest of the TBVC-states as it had platinum mines, which accounted for two-thirds of the total platinum production in the Western world. It was also rich in asbestos, granite, vanadium, chromium and manganese. Additional revenues came from the Sun City casino, which was a day trip from Johannesburg and Pretoria, where gambling was illegal under the National Party government, as it was throughout all of South Africa.

Bophuthatswana had a relatively capitalist free market economy, as seen by the government's drive for infrastructure development, foreign direct investments and virtually no regulatory barriers to starting and running a business. Initially, its economy was driven by agriculture then later by mining, hospitality and banking.

Bophuthatswana also issued bearer development bonds. The so-called "Bop Bonds" were redeemed by the government of the North West province from 1995 to 1997, and are now worthless as financial instruments. However, bonds in excellent condition are considered collectible. Bonds issued in 1988 and 1989, in R10 and R20 denominations, currently trade at 10–25% of original face value.

== Media ==
Bophuthatswana ran a now-defunct television station called Bop TV. Bop TV was also available in some townships like Soweto, for Tswana people (who were ostensibly citizens of Bophuthatswana), but the signal was also watched by white South Africans seeking a more entertaining alternative to the SABC.

== BOP Records ==
Bophuthatswana Recording Studios, also known as BRS or BOP, was constructed in 1991 as an effort to raise the international profile of South Africa.

== Security forces ==
Flag of the BDF

Towards the end of its existence, the Bophuthatswana Defence Force (BDF) had an estimated number of 4,000 troops, mostly infantry. It was organized into six military regions, and its ground forces included two infantry battalions, possessing two armoured personnel carriers. The Bophuthatswana Air Force of 150 personnel possessed three combat aircraft and two armed helicopters. The president was commander-in-chief and was authorised to deploy the armed forces in both cross-border operations as well as domestically.

During its last days in 1994, the Bophuthatswana Police had 6,002 police officers, operating from 56 police stations throughout the territory.

With the dissolution of Bophuthatswana in 1994, the BDF and the Bophuthatswana Police were incorporated into the South African National Defence Force and the South African Police Service, respectively.

== Coins ==
Bophuthatswana was the only Bantustan to produce its own coins. Two coins were minted as a proof set only; the South African Rand remained the official currency.

== Notable people ==
List of notable former residents of Bophuthatswana includes:

- Patrice Motsepe, businessman
- Herman Mashaba, businessman, president of ActionSA
- Mogoeng Mogoeng, former chief justice of South Africa
- Mamokgethi Phakeng, former vice chancellor of the University of Cape Town
- Tshepo Motsepe, businesswoman and first lady of South Africa
- Baaitse Nkabinde, former judge at the South African high court
- Refiloe Phoolo, musician and businessman
- Thato Sikwane, disk jockey and music producer
- Connie Ferguson, actress, film producer and businesswoman
- Motsi Mabuse, dancer and judge on Strictly Come Dancing

== See also ==
- Bantustan
- Coins of Bophuthatswana
- List of heads of state of Bophuthatswana
- Postal orders of Bophuthatswana
- List of historical unrecognized states and dependencies
- Satellite state
- Homeland
