= New Forces =

New Forces may refer to:

- Forces Nouvelles de Côte d'Ivoire
- New Democratic Force
- New Democratic Forces

== See also ==
- New Force (disambiguation)
