= Arona =

Arona may refer to:

== Places ==
- Arona, Piedmont, a town and commune in the Province of Novara, Italy
  - Arona railway station
- Arona, Tenerife, a municipality in the Canary Islands, Spain
- Arona, Pennsylvania, United States, a borough
- Arona Parish, Latvia

== Persons ==
- Arona Mané (born 1946), Senegalese Olympic wrestler
- Arone Teikatoara (died 1881), also spelled Arona, Mangareva prince regent
- Danilo Arona (born 1950), Italian writer
- Ricardo Arona (born 1978), Brazilian mixed martial artist
- Tinirau Arona (born 1989), New Zealand rugby league player

== Other uses ==
- SEAT Arona, a subcompact crossover SUV car model
- Arona (political party), a South African party active in Rustenburg Local Municipality
- Arona, A character in Blue Archive

== See also ==
- Aronas, Greece
