= Supingstad =

- Location within North West (South African province) Location within South Africa
- Coordinates: 24.790°S 26.068°E
- Country: South Africa
- Province: North West
- District: Ngaka Modiri Molema
- Municipality: Ramotshere Moiloa

Area
  - Total: 5.25 km^{2} (2.03 sq mi)

Population (2011)
  - Total: 2,453
  - Density: 467/km^{2} (1,210/sq mi)

Racial makeup (2011)
  - Black African: 99.5%
  - Coloured: 0.1%
  - Indian/Asian: 0.2%
  - White: 0.1%

First languages (2011)
  - Tswana: 94.9%
  - English: 1.8%
  - Other: 3.3%
- Time zone: UTC+2 (SAST)
- Postal code (street): 2886
- PO box: 2886
- Area code: 018

Supingstad is a town in Ngaka Modiri Molema District Municipality in the North West province of South Africa. It is the closest South African city to Gaborone.
