= New Force =

New Force or The New Force may refer to:

== Political groups ==
- New Force (Iceland), a short-lived minor anti-immigration party in the 2000s
- New Force (Italy), a minor far-right party since 1997
- New Force (Spain), a Francoist party, 1966–1982
- New Force Party in Thailand, a centre-left party, 1974–1988
- Ulster Conservatives and Unionists - New Force in Northern Ireland, the United Kingdom, a centre-right alliance, 2009–2012
- Bharatiya Navshakti Party (Indian New Force Party), an Indian political party
- New Force Social-Political Movement, former name of the Christian-Social Union of Moldova

== Other ==
- The New Force (TV series), a 2025 Swedish television series

== See also ==
- New Forces (disambiguation)
- New Power (disambiguation)
