= Danilo Arona =

Italian writer

Danilo Arona is an Italian writer, journalist, freelance writer and essayist, born in Alessandria, Piedmont, where he currently lives.

He has also been involved for years with fantasy literature and cinema, and has followed any reference or appearance of fantasy in the news and in Italian society.

== Works ==
=== Essays ===
- Guida al fantacinema, Gammalibri
- Guida al cinema horror, Ripostes
- Nuova guida al fantacinema - La maschera, la carne, il contagio, Puntozero
- Tutte storie - Immaginario italiano e leggende contemporanee, Costa & Nolan 1994
- Vien di notte l'Uomo Nero - Il cinema di Stephen King, Falsopiano 1997
- Satana ti vuole, Corbaccio
- Possessione mediatica, Marco Tropea Editore, 1998
- Wes Craven - Il buio oltre la siepe, Falsopiano, 1999

=== Novels ===
Arona has also written a number of fanta-noir novels, all set in Italy, including:

- La penombra del gufo, Amnesia
- Un brivido sulla schiena del Drago, Amnesia
- La pianura fa paura, Editoriale AGP
- Il vento urla Mary, PuntoZero
- Rock, Solid Books 2002
- L'ombra del dio alato, Marco Tropea, 2003
- L'esorcista, il cinema, il mito, Falsopiano, 2003
- Palo Mayombe, Dario Flaccovio, 2004
- La stazione del dio del suono, Larcher, 2004
- Cronache di Bassavilla, Dario Flaccovio, 2006
- Black Magic Woman, Frilli, 2006
- Finis Terrae, Mondadori, 2007
- Melissa Parker e l'incendio perfetto, Dino Audino, 2007
- Santanta, Perdisa, 2008
- L'estate di Montebuio, Gargoyle Books, 2009
- Ritorno a Bassavilla, Edizioni XII, 2009
