= Postal orders of Bophuthatswana =

Bophuthatswana began issuing its own postal orders shortly after gaining independence from South Africa in 1977. As Bophuthatswana did not have its own banknotes (because its currency was the rand), postal orders are the closest things to banknotes Bophuthatswana ever had. The last day of issue was 26 April 1994.

Some Bophuthatswanan postal order forms bear issue dates of 27 April 1994 and later, but these are classified as remainder issues, as Bophuthatswana was reincorporated into South Africa.

Postal orders on hand when Bophuthatswana reincorporated into South Africa are classified into two series:

- The Interim Series
- Post-readmission Series

== Remainder issues ==
Bophuthatswana Remainder Issue postal orders of the Interim Series were issued from 27 April 1994 until 31 May 1994. The Post-reincorporation Series were issued from 1 June 1994, when South Africa's return to the British Commonwealth took effect. The Remainder Issue postal orders of all four Bantustans (Bophuthatswana, Ciskei, Transkei, and Venda) interest postal order collectors, as they have become difficult to find, similar to those issued prior to reincorporation of the Bantustans into South Africa.
