= Wonder Mahlatsi =

South African politician

Wonder Mahlatsi MP

Member of the National Assembly
- Incumbent
- Assumed office 21 May 2014

Personal details
- Party: United Africans Transformation (since 2022)
- Other political affiliations: African National Congress (until 2022)
- Education: University of South Africa
- Profession: Politician

Lehlohonolo Wonderboy Mahlatsi is a South African politician who has been a member of the National Assembly of South Africa since being elected in 2024. He is the leader of the United Africans Transformation, and sits in the South African parliament as part of the Progressive Caucus in opposition to the Government of National Unity.

== Political career ==
As leader, Mahlatsi was nominated as the lead candidate on the national list of the UAT at the 2024 general election. He was elected to the National Assembly from this list as the sole MP from the UAT, the UAT having received 0.22% of the nationwide vote.

The UAT initially intended to negotiate with the African National Congress to join the Government of National Unity, however Mahlatsi withdrew from these negotiations, accusing the ANC of "acting in bad faith" by not giving him a position in the Ramaphosa cabinet.

Mahlatsi identifies as Pan-African, and supports land expropriation without compensation.

In the parliament, Mahlatsi sits on the portfolio committees on land reform and rural development, and on agriculture. He also is a member of the Parliamentary Group on International Relations.

== Personal life ==
Mahlatsi was raised in Sebokeng, Gauteng, and attended Fundulwazi Secondary School as a student. He has a PhD in criminal justice and had a career in law enforcement before his election to parliament.
