= Motswedi =

- Location within North West (South African province) Location within South Africa
- Coordinates: 25.279°S 25.885°E
- Country: South Africa
- Province: North West
- District: Ngaka Modiri Molema
- Municipality: Ramotshere Moiloa
- Main Place: Sekgwakgwe

Area
  - Total: 4.54 km^{2} (1.75 sq mi)

Population (2011)
  - Total: 2,794
  - Density: 615/km^{2} (1,590/sq mi)

Racial makeup (2011)
  - Black African: 99.7%
  - Coloured: 0.1%
  - Indian/Asian: 0.2%

First languages (2011)
  - Tswana: 93.9%
  - English: 2.5%
  - Zulu: 1.0%
  - Other: 2.6%
- Time zone: UTC+2 (SAST)
- PO box: 2870
- Area code: 018

Motswedi is a Village in Ngaka Modiri Molema District Municipality in the North West province of South Africa.

The village is 44 km north-west of Zeerust; the Riet River rises in the north of the village.

The first recorded mention of the settlement is around 1800, when it was occupied by the baKgatla ba ga Mmanaana, who abandoned the village in 1808 after being attacked by the baNgwaketse. It was then occupied by the baHurutshe, and became the headquarters of the independent baHurutshe boo Manyane in the 1880s. In the 1970s and 1980s Motswedi expanded, and a large dam and schools were established.
