= Lucas Mangope =

South African politician (1923–2018)

- Mangope in 2007

President of Bophuthatswana
- In office 6 December 1977 – 13 March 1994
- Preceded by: Post established
- Succeeded by: Post abolished

Chief Minister of Bophuthatswana
- In office 1 June 1972 – 6 December 1977

Chief Councillor of Tswanaland
- In office c 1968 – 1 June 1972

Personal details
- Born: Kgosi Lucas Manyane Mangope; 27 December 1923 Motswedi, Transvaal, South Africa
- Died: 18 January 2018 (aged 94) Motswedi, Lehurutshe, South Africa
- Party: Bophuthatswana Democratic Party; Tswana National Party; United Christian Democratic Party
- Spouses: Leah (died 2003) Violet Mongale (m. 2007)

Kgosi Lucas Manyane Mangope (27 December 1923 – 18 January 2018) was the leader of the Bantustan (homeland) of Bophuthatswana. The territory he ruled over was distributed between the Orange Free State – what is now Free State – and North West Province. He was also the founder and leader of the United Christian Democratic Party, a political party based in the North West of South Africa.

== Education ==
Mangope attended an Anglican mission school for most of his school career. He matriculated from St. Peter's College, Rosetenville in Johannesburg in 1946. After matric, he registered for a Junior Teaching Diploma at the Diocesan Teachers' Training College in Polokwane (then called Pietersburg). He studied towards a Higher Primary Teacher’s Diploma at Bethel College in the Transvaal from 1951. After graduating he started teaching and specialised as an Afrikaans teacher. He taught at secondary schools in Mahikeng, Motswedi, Krugersdorp and Potchefstroom and was awarded in 1959 when one of his classes obtained the best results in Afrikaans among competing schools in South Africa.

== Career ==
When the Tswana Territorial Authority was established in 1961, Mangope became the vice-chairman, working under Chief TR Pilane. He was promoted to the Chief Chancellor of the organisation in 1968. He remained in the position until 1972 when he became the first Chief Minister of Bophuthatswana. He was also accused of spying for foreign powers, misappropriation of state funds, repossession of land from tribal authorities without adequate compensation and discrepancies in appointments and salaries within the Bophuthatswana Defence Force.

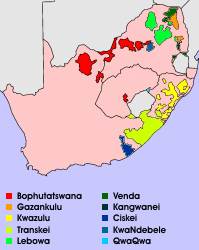
Map of South African Bantustans.

He became President in 1977, when Bophuthatswana was declared independent by the South African government. On 10 February 1988 he was briefly overthrown by members of a military police unit, led by Rocky Malebane-Metsing of the People's Progressive Party (PPP), who had accused Mangope of corruption and charged that the recent election had been rigged in the government's favour. Mangope was reinstated following intervention by the South African Defence Force. South Africa's government stated that it was responding to a request for assistance from the legal government of a sovereign nation.

Sasha Polakow-Suransky (American journalist and author) wrote that Mangope was "widely considered a puppet and a joke in South Africa" during his presidency. Mangope was nevertheless given some recognition during visits to Israel, meeting with prominent figures such as Moshe Dayan. Bophuthatswana had an unofficial "embassy" in Israel in the 1980s despite objections from the Israeli Foreign Ministry, which did not recognize the bantustan as a state.

Mangope was accused of using his defence force and police to suppress protests, and had been accused of police brutality when a student protest was suppressed by his police force. Mangope's supporters, however, have argued that Bophuthatswana was comparatively more successful than other Bantustans in social and economic development, owing to its mineral wealth. Although designated as an ethnic Tswana homeland, Bophuthatswana was more or less an integrated society where Apartheid legislation did not apply, in common with other homelands.

=== 1994 crisis ===
At the Kempton Park negotiations in 1993 that led to the first non-racial election in South Africa in 1994, Mangope had made it clear that Bophuthatswana would remain independent of the new and integrated South Africa and that he would not allow the upcoming election to take place in "his country". With most residents in favour of reintegration, the homeland's military mutinied. Mangope called on outside help, but was eventually forced to flee the homeland, and shortly thereafter, the homelands were reincorporated into South Africa.

=== After Bophuthatswana ===
Pik Botha, South Africa’s Foreign Minister at the time, and member of the Transitional Executive Council Mac Maharaj removed Mangope from office in March 1994.

After the transition to nonracial democracy, Mangope remained active in politics, forming the United Christian Democratic Party in 1997. Party support was confined to the North West Province (which contained most of Bophuthatswana), and at its peak it held three seats out of 400 in the National Assembly. His party argued that under the Xhosa-led ANC, their quality of life in the province would deteriorate and that conditions were improved because Tswana people ruled themselves. Mangope led the party for fifteen years, but was expelled from the party in 2012. He had been accused of being autocratic, but failed to attend his disciplinary hearing, and had his membership terminated. In the runup to the following election, in 2014, many of the party's members, encouraged by Mangope, left to join the Democratic Alliance. The party subsequently lost all of its seats including those in the provincial parliament and provincial legislature.

== Beliefs ==
Speaking to the Financial Mail in June 1980, Mangope professed his belief in capitalist free enterprise, saying it would lead to "true freedom and prosperity for our people" if it is "regulated by a strong sense of social responsibility". He lamented the fact that capitalism had failed to make itself more appealing in Africa and failed to defend itself against the attacks of Marxism. According to Mangope, free enterprise has led to more material prosperity in African nations that have adopted it. He concluded:

"I believe that free enterprise, at its best, encourages not only individuals, but whole communities and societies to aspire upwards."

== Death and legacy ==
A statue of Mangope was erected outside the Bahurutshe Boo Manyane tribal office in the North West’s Motswedi (his place of birth) to honour him. Mangope died at his home in Motswedi, Lehurutshe on 18 January 2018, aged 94. Following his death, officials from the organisation expressed wishes to establish the statue as a tourist attraction since it was the last one standing of the late former president.

In 2012, a street named after Mangope in North West Province was renamed to honour Molefe Makinta instead; another street named after his wife Leah was also renamed.

In 2020, it was reported that the infrastructure that the Mangope administration built worth over R1 billion was abandoned by the current administration.

== Family ==
Mangope was initially married to a woman named Leah, and they had seven children. Leah survived a car accident involving a donkey in the mid-1980s. Soon after, her husband ordered the mass slaughter of donkeys by police. The killing of the animals continued for seven years. Mangope justified it with the argument that donkeys were dangerous and had become a hazard on the roads. Other sources say it was Mangope himself who nearly collided with a donkey. However, the decision to cull donkeys was more likely due to the drought that was ongoing at the time. Leah eventually died on 23 July 2003. Mangope remarried in May 2007 to Violet Mongale, a senior nurse.
