= Bophuthatswana Democratic Party =

Political party in Apartheid South Africa

Bophuthatswana Democratic Party Bophuthatswana National Party Lekoko la Temokerasi la Bophuthatswana Lekoko la bosetšhaba la Bophuthatswana
- Leader: Lucas Mangope
- Founded: 6 December 1977
- Dissolved: 13 March 1994
- Succeeded by: United Christian Democratic Party
- Ideology: Pro-apartheid; Economic liberalism Authoritarianism; Tswana nationalism
- Political position: Right-wing
- Regional affiliation: National Party (South Africa)

The Bophuthatswana Democratic Party (founded as the Bophuthatswana National Party) was the dominant party in Bantustan Bophuthatswana. It was founded around 1977. Under the leadership of Lucas Mangope, it launched a campaign to build hospitals, schools and sports stadia. The party was pro-apartheid.
