= United Africans Transformation =

Political party in South Africa

- President: Wonder Mahlatsi
- Founded: November 2022
- Split from: ANC
- Ideology: Pan-Africanism; Socialism
- Political position: Left-wing
- National affiliation: Progressive Caucus
- National Assembly seats: 1 / 400
- Provincial Legislatures: 1 / 487

Website
- www.uat2023.org.za

The United Africans Transformation (UAT) is a minor political party in South Africa. It was founded in November 2022 by a group of individuals who hold the same Africanism ideology. The UAT is centered around Africanism, pan-Africanism, and socialism. Following the 2024 South African general election, president Cyril Ramaphosa announced that the UAT had joined the government of national unity (GNU). However, the UAT withdrew from the GNU after it did not receive any positions in the Cabinet.

== History ==
=== Formation ===
The party was founded by Wonder Mahlatsi, a former African National Congress (ANC) member and businessman. The party was launched in November 2022 in Johannesburg. The UAT has been criticized for its lack of clear policies and its perceived opportunism in breaking away from the ANC. Some have also questioned the leadership style and the party's lack of transparency in its finances and decision-making processes.

=== Participation in Government of National Unity ===
In June 2024, president Cyril Ramaphosa stated that the UAT had joined the Government of National Unity (GNU), which was formed in the wake of the ANC losing its parliamentary majority for the first time in 30 years. The GNU aimed to include various political parties to ensure stable government where no party had an absolute majority.

In July 2024, Mahlatsi remarked, "it took us by surprise to hear the President of the Republic announcing that the UAT is part of GNU," implying that formalities for it joining the GNU had not been concluded by the time the president announced that it had joined.

In the same statement, Mahlatsi announced the UAT's withdrawal from the GNU due to allegations of exclusion from critical decision-making processes and bad faith negotiations, after it did not get any ministerial posts or chairperson positions in parliamentary committee portfolios. He expressed disappointment with the ANC, emphasizing the need for fair and inclusive coalition governance.

== Current structure and composition ==
UAT has a central committee led by Mahlatsi as the president, with a secretary-general and other office bearers. The party has a small presence in a few provinces, with most of its support coming from the Gauteng and KwaZulu-Natal provinces. The UAT has not articulated a clear foreign policy but has expressed support for African unity and solidarity with other African nations. The UAT's ideology is centered around Africanism, pan-Africanism, and socialism. Its policies focus on economic empowerment, land reform, and social justice.

== Election results ==
The UAT has contested local government elections in 2019 and national elections in 2024. In the 2024 General Election, the party won 1 seat in the National Assembly and 1 seat in the Limpopo Provincial Legislature.

=== National Assembly elections ===
Election	Party leader	Total votes	Share of vote	Seats	+/–	Government
2024	Wonder Mahlatsi	35,679	0.22% (Note: From 2024, seats in the National Assembly are determined by a combination of the national ballot, and the nine regional ballots. Only the national ballot figures are shown here.)	1 / 400	New	Opposition

=== National Council of Provinces ===
Election	Total # of seats won	+/–	Government
2024	0	0	0

=== Provincial elections ===
Election	Eastern Cape		Free State		Gauteng		Kwazulu-Natal		Limpopo		Mpumalanga		North-West		Northern Cape		Western Cape	
Election	%	Seats	%	Seats	%	Seats	%	Seats	%	Seats	%	Seats	%	Seats	%	Seats	%	Seats
2024			0.17	0/30	0.23	1/80			0.82	1/64	0.48	0/51	0.54	0/38				
