= South African Political Party =

Political party in South Africa

- National Assembly seats: 0 / 400
- Provincial Legislatures: 0 / 430

The South African Political Party (SAPP) is a minor South African political party based in Mmabatho, North West province.

It contested the provincial elections in the North West in 2009, 2014 and 2019, failing to win a seat and suffering a reduction in vote share on each occasion.

== Election results ==
=== Provincial elections ===
Election	Eastern Cape		Free State		Gauteng		Kwazulu-Natal		Limpopo		Mpumalanga		North-West		Northern Cape		Western Cape	
Election	%	Seats	%	Seats	%	Seats	%	Seats	%	Seats	%	Seats	%	Seats	%	Seats	%	Seats
2009	-	-	-	-	-	-	-	-	-	-	-	-	0.17%	0/33	-	-	-	-
2014	-	-	-	-	-	-	-	-	-	-	-	-	0.06%	0/33	-	-	-	-
2019	-	-	-	-	-	-	-	-	-	-	-	-	0.04%	0/33	-	-	-	-
