= Forum for Service Delivery =

South African political party

Forum 4 Service Delivery
- Founder: Mbahare Johannes Kekana
- Founded: 2015
- Dissolved: January 2025
- Merged into: ActionSA
- Headquarters: Steven House Brooklyn
- Colours: White, Green and Black
- National Assembly seats: 0 / 400
- Provincial Legislatures: 0 / 430

Website
- forum4sd.org.za

The Forum 4 Service Delivery (F4SD) was a South African political party founded in 2015 to tackle grassroots issues such as water, sanitation, housing, immigration laws, education and children going to school without shoes. The party registered to contest the 2016 South African municipal elections in five provinces: North West, Mpumalanga, Northern Cape, Gauteng and Limpopo.

The party contested the 2016 Local Government elections, winning 31 seats, 29 in the North West Province, and one each in Mpumalanga and the Free State. The party also contested also 2019 general election but failed to win a seat. The party's primary demand in their 2019 manifesto was direct speedy services to the people and the removal of all foreign nationals.

== Merger with ActionSA ==
In January 2025, the party merged with ActionSA and plans to contest the 2026 local government elections under the ActionSA banner. Party leader Mbahare Kekana was appointed Deputy President of ActionSA.

== Election results ==
=== National Assembly elections ===
Election	Party leader	Total votes	Share of vote	Seats	+/–	Government
2019	Mbahare Johannes Kekana	8,525	0.05%	0 / 400	New	Extra-parliamentary
2024	Mbahare Johannes Kekana	11,077	0.07% (Note: From 2024, seats in the National Assembly are determined by a combination of the national ballot, and the nine regional ballots. Only the national ballot figures are shown here.)	0 / 400	0	Extra-parliamentary

=== Provincial elections ===
Election	Eastern Cape		Free State		Gauteng		Kwazulu-Natal		Limpopo		Mpumalanga		North-West		Northern Cape		Western Cape	
Election	%	Seats	%	Seats	%	Seats	%	Seats	%	Seats	%	Seats	%	Seats	%	Seats	%	Seats
2019	0.05	0/63									0.08	0/30	0.33	0/33			0.02	0/42
2024					0.03	0/80			0.10	0/64			0.58	0/38				

=== Municipal elections ===
Election	Votes	%	Change
2016	86,667	0.23%	-
2021	81,960	0.27%	▲0.04

In the 2021 election, the party increased its representation from one to two seats in the Ditsobotla Local Municipality. In the 2022 election, held after the entire council was dissolved, it retained its seats.
