= United Christian Democratic Party =

Political party in South Africa

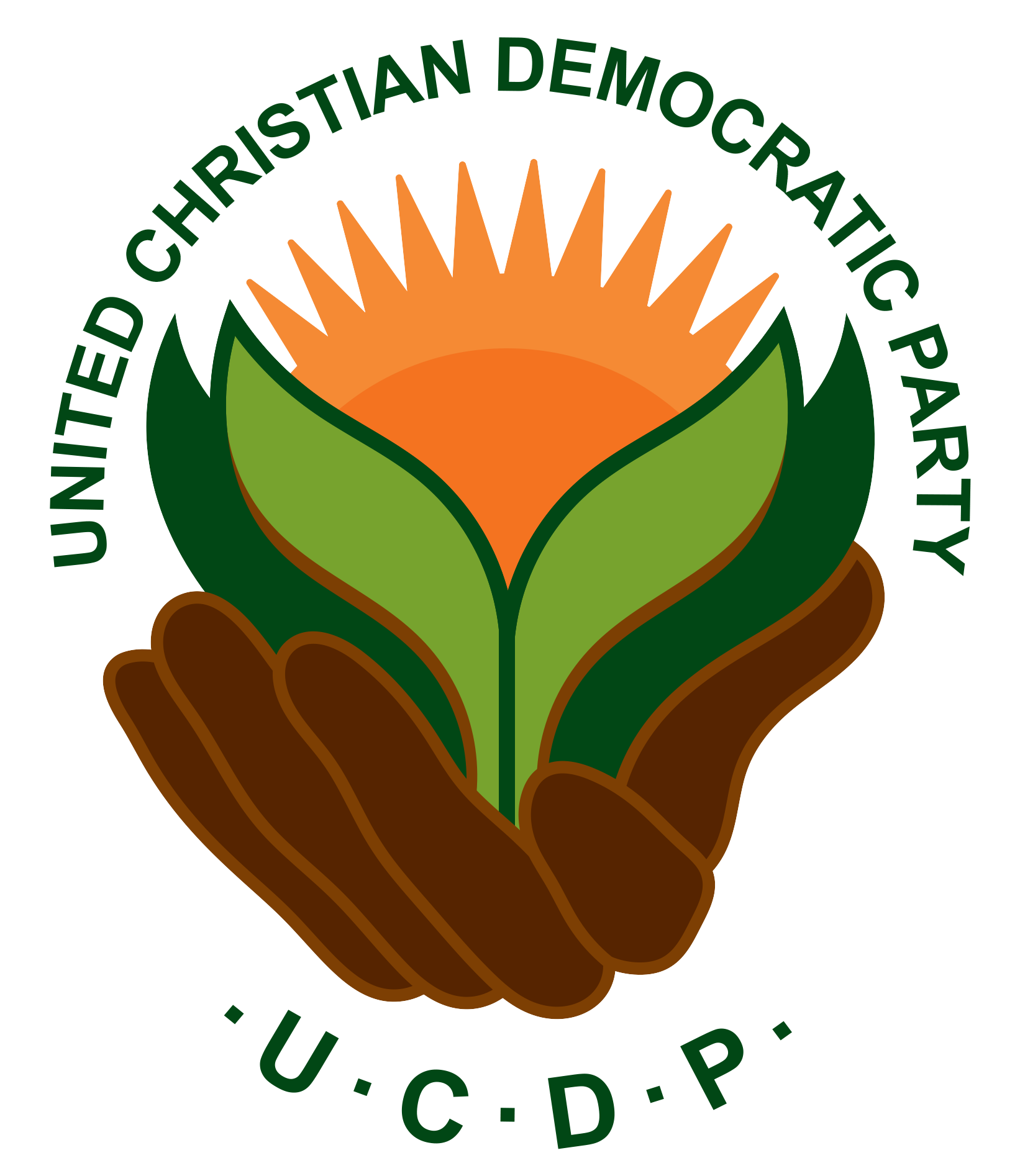
- Abbreviation: UCDP
- Leader: Modiri Desmond Sehume
- President: Modiri Desmond Sehume
- Founder: Lucas Mangope
- Founded: 1997
- Preceded by: Bophuthatswana Democratic Party
- Headquarters: Mafikeng, North West Province
- Youth wing: UCDP Youth League
- Ideology: Christian democracy Economic liberalism
- Political position: Centre-right
- National affiliation: Multi-Party Charter (MPC)
- Colours: orange, brown and green
- Slogan: Stand Up and Speak Out
- National Assembly seats: 0 / 400
- NCOP seats: 0 / 90

Website
- ucdponline.org.za

The United Christian Democratic Party (UCDP) is a minor political party in South Africa. It was founded by Lucas Mangope, former leader of the Bophuthatswana bantustan. Most of the party's support comes from the North West province (where the old Bophuthatswana was located), and it has very little presence elsewhere in the country. The UCDP was the official opposition to the African National Congress (ANC) in the North West Provincial Legislature between 1999 and 2009.

The current President is Modiri Desmond Sehume

== History ==
Lucas Mangope formed the party in 1997 as a successor to the Tswana National Party, and led it for the first fifteen years. UCDP had its greatest electoral success in the early years of its existence, emerging as the largest opposition party in the North West province in 1999 and putting up a serious challenge for control of the Mafikeng Local Municipality in the 2000 South African municipal elections. The party was however dealt a blow when it lost 24 municipal councillors to the ANC during the 2002 floor crossing period.

This started a period of gradual but steady decline. The party held onto its official opposition status in the 2004 election, only losing some support, but slipped to fourth in the provincial legislature in the 2009 elections; the party won 66,086 votes (0.37% of the national total), and two seats in Parliament, representing a loss of approximately 50% of its support, and one seat, from the preceding elections.

In the provincial elections, their support dropped from 8.49% and three seats in the 2004 North West provincial election, to 5.27% and two seats in 2009. In 2009, in six of the other provinces, they gained less than 0.1% support.

In the 2014 elections, the party slumped further, losing all of its provincial and national seats.

After the 2021 municipal elections, the UCDP retains a small presence at local level with elected representatives in five municipalities, all in the North West.

== Leadership ==
Mavis Matladi was elected as its leader on 29 January 2011 after the expulsion of Mangope. After Matladi died in December 2011, Isaac Sipho Mfundisi was elected president on Saturday, 7 January 2012.

Mfundisi was succeeded by the current President Modiri Desmond Sehume who was elected in the Federal Congress in 2019.

== Platform ==
The party's mission statement stresses the need for Christian values, non-racial democracy, and government inducements for personal self-reliance, while the 2004 manifesto attacked the ANC for, among other things, its alleged softness on crime, nepotism, and neglect of South African infrastructure.

A 2003 survey conducted by the Human Sciences Research Council found that 85% of UCDP voters were female.

== Election results ==
=== National elections ===
Election	Total votes	Share of vote	Seats	+/–	Government
1999	125,280	0.80	3 / 400	–	in opposition
2004	117,792	0.75	3 / 400	±0	in opposition
2009	66,086	0.37	2 / 400	▼1	in opposition
2014	21,744	0.12	0 / 400	▼2	extraparliamentary

=== Provincial elections ===
Election	Eastern Cape		Free State		Gauteng		Kwazulu-Natal		Limpopo		Mpumalanga		North-West		Northern Cape		Western Cape	
Election	%	Seats	%	Seats	%	Seats	%	Seats	%	Seats	%	Seats	%	Seats	%	Seats	%	Seats
1999	-	-	0.78%	0/30	0.24%	0/73	-	-	0.23%	0/49	-	-	9.57%	3/33	-	-	-	-
2004	0.12%	0/63	0.77%	0/30	0.26%	0/73	0.14%	0/80	0.22%	0/49	0.17%	0/30	8.49%	3/33	0.33%	0/30	0.23%	0/42
2009	0.08%	0/63	0.33%	0/30	0.24%	0/73	0.05%	0/80	0.09%	0/49	0.07%	0/30	5.27%	2/33	1.21%	0/30	0.08%	0/42
2014	0.05%	0/63	0.11%	0/30	0.08%	0/73	0.06%	0/80	0.06%	0/49	0.06%	0/30	1.18%	0/33	0.37%	0/30	0.05%	0/42
2019	-	-	-	-	-	-	-	-	-	-	-	-	0.48%	0/33	-	-	-	-

=== Municipal elections ===
Election	Votes	%
2000		1.0%
2006	334,504	1.3%
2011	168,351	0.6%
2016	28,241	0.07%
2021	26,331	0.09%
