= Gcaleka House =

Ruling House of the Xhosa Kingdom

The Gcaleka House is the senior house of the Xhosa Kingdom in what is now the Eastern Cape. Its royal palace is in the former Transkei and its counterpart in the former Ciskei is the Rharhabe, which is the second senior house.

The Gcaleka House was founded by Gcaleka kaPhalo, who became King of the Xhosa nation in 1775.

== History ==
The Xhosa Kingdom had been the most feared Kingdom even before the establishment of the two royal Gcaleka and Rharhabe Houses. The Xhosa royal blood line stretches from Ntu, whose heir was Mnguni, the father of Xhosa .

The whole division within the Xhosa nation stretches to the time when King Phalo had both of his intended wives arriving on the same day, and for whom he had already paid lobola, one from the Mpondo royal family and one from the Thembu royal family.

As both brides were from royal houses of high standing, Phalo had caused a dilemma within the Xhosa nation by marrying two princesses at the same time. This great dilemma was that, were the king to marry and make the one princess his great wife from whom the heir would be born; it would cause great insult to the one family whose daughter had been demoted to a lesser status. Generally in such instances war would ensue.

The Kingdom of the Xhosa called upon its wise men, one of whom was Majeke from the great Nqabara region under the Willowvale district in the Eastern Cape. He advised that the princess which set foot first within the Xhosa Royal home (Komkhulu) should give birth to the heir. The Mpondo princess set foot first and she was then announced the Great wife of the Xhosa nation (mother to the heir). The Thembu princess was then announced Right Hand house, which is second most senior but independent of the Great House.

Phalo had two 'first born' sons from each house, Rharhabe, the eldest but from his Right House and Gcaleka, the first born from the Great House. As both princes grew, each could not be so different from the other; Gcaleka was always by his mother's side, quiet and introverted, while Rharhabe was a fearless warrior prince.

Because of Rharabe's increasing popularity and fearing that he might lose his birthright to his brother, Gcaleka attempted to overthrow his father and seize the throne for himself, but failed. Rharhabe was advised by his father to leave the great place and was granted a great number of followers to cross the river Kei and rule over the various Xhosa tribes who were resident there' while a sub group of AmaKwai Clan led by their local Headman Sihota ka Nciba the grandson of Gando ka Ngconde were residing near the Kei river banks became part of AmaGcaleka Kingdom Gcaleka remained and upon his father's death succeeded him as the King of all the Xhosa .

The King Mpendulo Zwelonke Sigcawu whose great place is located in Nqadu, Willowvale died in 2019.

== Heirs ==
The heir from the Right Hand House of the Xhosa Kingdom becomes the ruler of multiple chiefdoms in Western Xhosaland but still recognizes the 'IKumkani'(Emperor) as senior, while the heir born from the Great House, automatically by culture succeeds as 'IKumkani'(Emperor). The genealogy from Ngconde kaTogu is used to offer more context but amaGcaleka were formed in 1775.

- Ngconde kaTogu (1606-1693)
- Gando kaNgconde (1626-1722)
- Tshiwo kaNgconde (unknown – 1702)
- Mdange kaNgconde, acting (1702 – 1736)
- Phalo kaTshiwo (1736 – 1775)
- Gcaleka kaPhalo, formally established the Great House (1775 – 1792)
- Khawuta kaGcaleka (1792 – 1804)
- Nqoko kaGcaleka, acting (1804 – 1820)
- Hintsa kaKhawuta (1820 – 1835)
- Sarili kaHintsa (1835 – 1893)
- Sigcawu ka Sarili (1893 – 1902)
- Salukaphathwa Gwebinkumbi kaSigcawu (1902 – 1921)
- Daliza kaSigcawu, acting (1921 – 1923)
- Mpisekhaya Ngangomhlaba Sigcawu kaGwebinkumbi (1923 – 1933)
- Bungeni Zwelidumile Sigcawu kaGwebinkumbi (1933 – 1965)
- Xolilizwe Mzikayise Sigcawu (1965 – 2005)
- Zwelonke Sigcawu (2006 – 2019)
- Dumehleli Nongudle Mapasa, acting (2019 – 2020)
- Ahlangene Sigcawu (2020 –)

== The Great Cattle Killing ==
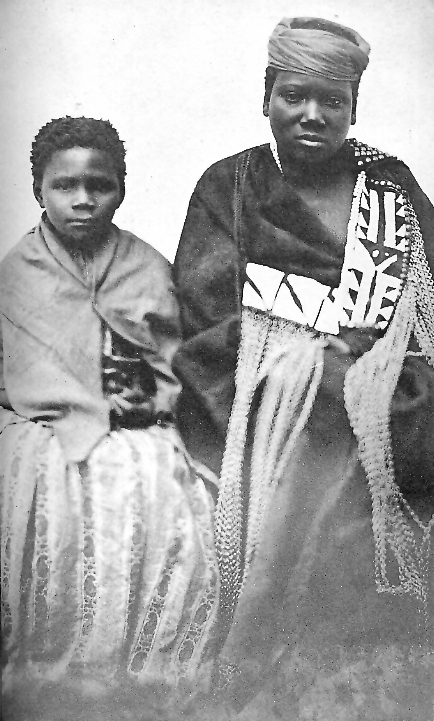
Nongqawuse (right) and Nonkosi, a fellow prophetess

Nongqawuse was a young, orphaned prophetess who lived with her uncle Mhlakaza, a Xhosa spiritualist, at the Gxarha River. One day in April 1856, Nongqawuse told her household that she had been visited by spirits of her ancestors who had ordered her to inform the Xhosa to kill their cattle and destroy their crops. Nonqawuse claimed that the spirits informed her that if the Xhosa did as they commanded all European settlers in the region would be swept into the sea. Mhlakaza communicated the prophecies to Sarhili kaHintsa, who was the chief at the time.

The Xhosa had recently suffered defeat during the Eighth Frontier War (1850–1853) and lost much of their cattle to an unknown disease. Sarhili kaHintsa and many of the Xhosa people embraced the prophecy but fifteen months later, the prophecies predicted by Nongqawuse did not materialize. They lost over 400,000 cattle and corn for the coming season during that time and 40,000 people are believed to have died of starvation. Those who survived resorted to begging in the Cape Colony for food and other relief.

George Grey, the Governor of the Cape Colony at the time, dispersed the Xhosa refugees to serve as workers for the inhabitants of the colony. Grey also imprisoned several leaders who came to the Cape Colony on charges of inciting a war against the colony.

== Conflict ==
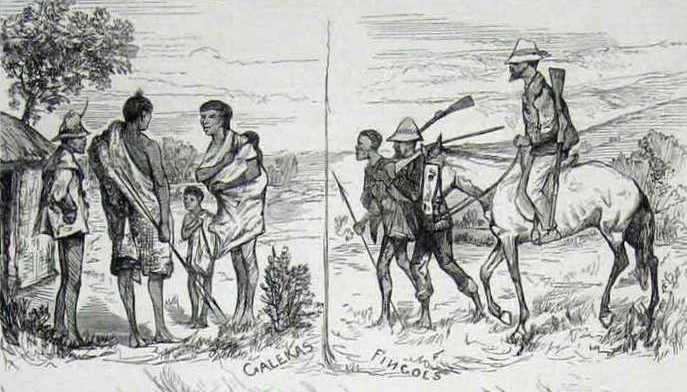
Gcaleka and Fengu dress and weapons 1878

The Fengu-Gcaleka War, also known as Ngcayechibi's War, occurred between 1877 and 1879 during Sarhili kaHintsa’s reign. The Fengu people (or amaFengu), who eventually started adopting the Xhosa language and culture, were originally formed when the Zulu nation was dispersed by King Shaka and his armies during the Mfecane wars. AmaFengu are known as the traditional enemies of the Gcaleka royalty, especially in the mid-1870s following a series of droughts which increased tension between local tribes.

The war started after a bar fight during a social event hosted by a man called Ngcayechibi. A fight broke out between amaFengu and amaGcaleka guests. This escalated into a shoot-out which eventually gave rise to Ngcayechibi's War. Many Fengu people were citizens of the Cape Colony which garnered them military support from the Cape’s government.

The conflict involved the Gcaleka, the Ngqika, British, amaFengu and their Cape Colony allies. Sarili tried to unite the Xhosa tribes and failed. He was exiled in Pondoland in Bomvanaland, where he died in 1892.

== Womanhood ==
Customs vary between Xhosa tribes. Intonjane is one which is commonly performed by amaGcaleka. The Gcaleka practise of intonjane, which involves a number of ceremonies which speak to the rite of passage of Xhosa girls. It aims to prepare girls for marriage and womanhood. Initiates take part in rituals performed by their birth families, which include physical and spiritual cleansing, prayers and offerings, blessings, traditional food, clothing and music. It also involves the imparting of wisdom by elderly Xhosa women, including encouraging abstinence until marriage for girls.

== See also ==
- List of rulers of the Gcaleka
- List of rulers of the Rharhabe
- List of Xhosa Chiefs
- List of Xhosa Kings
- List of Xhosa people
- Xhosa clan names
- Xhosa language
- Xhosa people
- Xhosa Wars
- Rharhabe
- List of rulers of the Gcaleka
- List of rulers of the Rharhabe
- Kaffraria
- Sandile (surname)
- Sebe (surname)
- Sigcawu
