= List of rulers of the Gcaleka =

This is a list of the paramounts of the Xhosa of the Eastern Cape province in modern South Africa.

- Gcaleka kaPhalo (1775–1792)
- Khawuta kaGcaleka (1792–1804)
- Nqoko kaGcaleka (1804–1820)
- Hintsa kaKhawuta (1820–1835)
- Sarili kaHintsa (1835–1892)
- Sigcawu kaSarili (1892–1902)
- Salukaphathwa Gwebi'nkumbi Sigcawu (1902–1921)
- Daliza Sigcawu (1921–1923)
- Mpisekhaya Ngangomhlaba Sigcawu (1923–1933)
- Bungeni Zwelidumile Sigcawu (1933–1965)
- Xolilizwe Mzikayise Sigcawu (1965–2005)
- Zwelonke Sigcawu (2005–2019)
- Dumehleli Nongudle Mapasa, Regent (2019–2020)
- Ahlangene Sigcawu (2020–Present)

== See also ==
- Gcaleka
- Rharhabe
- Sandile (surname)
- Sebe (surname)
- Sigcawu
- List of rulers of the Rharhabe
- List of Xhosa Chiefs
- List of Xhosa Kings
- List of Xhosa people
