= List of rulers of the Rharhabe =

This is a list of the paramounts of the Xhosa of the Eastern Cape province in modern South Africa.

- Rarabe kaPhalo (Reigned-From:1753 Till 1782)
- Mlawu kaRarabe (he never became King because he died with his father in bettle.)
- Ndlambe kaRarabe (Reigned-From:1782 Till 1797)
- Ngqika kaMlawu (Reigned-From:1797 Till 1829)
- Maqoma (Reigned-From:1829 Till 1840)
- Sandile kaNgqika (Reigned-From:1840 Till 1878)
- (Edmund) Gonya KaSandile (Reigned-From:1878 Till 1906)
- Faku KaGonya (Not to be confused with the Ama-Mpondo-King Faku Ka-Ngqungqushe) (Reigned-From:1906 Till 1932)
- (Archie) Velile KaFaku (Reigned-From:1932 Till 1965)
- Mxolisi Bazindlovu KaVelile (Reigned-From:1965 Till 1985)
- Nolizwe Sandile (Held-Power-From:1985 Till 1991)
- Maxhoba Zanesizwe Sandile (Reigned-From:1991 Till 2011)
- Noloyiso Sandile (Held-Power-From:2011 Till 2020)
- Jonguxolo Sandile (Reigning-Since:2020 Till Present-Date)

== See also ==
- Gcaleka
- Rharhabe
- Sandile (surname)
- Sebe (surname)
- Sigcawu
- List of rulers of the Gcaleka
- List of Xhosa Chiefs
- List of Xhosa Kings
- List of Xhosa people
