= ImiDushane =

Xhosa Principality

The Imidushane clan was founded by one of the greatest Xhosa warriors Prince Mdushane who was the eldest son of Prince Ndlambe, the son of King Rharhabe.

The Imidushane are therefore a subgroup within the Xhosa nation and can be found in the Eastern Cape, South Africa where they have three Traditional Councils in Tamarha near King William's Town, Ncerha near East London and Centane in the Mnquma Local Municipality.

Although sometimes referred to by the misnomer "Imidushane kaNdlambe"; the Imidushane are in fact a distinct tribe separate from the amaNdlambe, i.e. the tribe of Prince Ndlambe; having been established after Mdushane succeeded his uncle Prince Cebo who had died without male successors, as the heir to the Right Hand House of King Rharhabe.

== Rharhabe's reign ==
Rharhabe was the great son of the Right Hand House of King Phalo and is said to have been born around 1722. King Phalo was the last absolute ruler over a united Xhosa Kingdom, which is now split between the amaGcaleka and the amaRharhabe Xhosa branches.

According to Xhosa tradition, King Phalo had intended to marry two royal brides from two different kingdoms for whom he had paid lobola. However, one day he was caught by surprised when both bridal parties arrived simultaneously at his great place to begin the wedding festivities. In order to avoid offending either father of the intended brides; Phalo was convinced by one of his councillors to marry both princesses on the same day, making one princess his wife from the Great House and the other, the wife of the Right Hand House. The two houses would be independent of each other and equal in status; thereby avoiding any confrontation with the two noble families.

The great wife would bear the heir to the throne being the representative of the senior line; while the great son of the Right Hand House would be independent of his brother and would in due course be able create his own kingdom. Phalo had two important sons from the two houses who would play a pivotal role in the history of the amaXhosa; Prince Gcaleka his heir, born from the Great House, and Prince Rharhabe who was the eldest, born from the Right Hand House.

Rharhabe was much loved by his father and grew up to become a very successful and skilled hunter, whilst also a renowned warrior who was fearless in battle. As a result of Rharhabe's increasing popularity amongst his father's people; Gcaleka feared that one day he might lose his birthright as head of the senior branch to his brother and as such he tried to usurp the throne from his father. Rharhabe came to his father's aid and managed to quell this attempted coup by his brother. In order to keep the peace, Rharhabe with the blessing of his father, moved away from the great place and was provided with his own retinue and followers to create his own kingdom.

Accompanied by his father, Rharhabe left the great place and initially settled at Hohita near the amaNdungwana clan. It was during this period that Rharhabe would marry his great wife Queen Nojoli daughter of Ndungwana of the Thembu nation and they had three sons and two daughters. His sons were Prince Mlawu, Prince Ndlambe and Prince Nukwa; and his daughters were Princess Ntsusa and Princess Khinzela. After some time, Rharhabe and his followers left Hohita and settled at Amabele near present-day Stutterheim.

It was here that he would be engaged in many battles over land and cattle with the Twa people, who he found in this new territory. He was able within a short period of time to extend his territory and gain many followers. His influence was also felt by the various smaller Xhosa clans such as the imiDange, the amaGqunukwebe, amaMbalu and amaNtinde, who had long enjoyed their independence from the great place, having traversed the Great Kei River sometime between the late 1600s and early 1700s.

Rharhabe's great son from the Right Hand House was Prince Cebo. There is not much known about this prince except that in the prime of his years he was murdered by the amaQwathi clan, who ambushed him after taking offence to this prince demanding more lobola from his half-sister Ntsusa's husband Mdandala, who was a Qwathi chief. It is said that chief Mdandala had delivered as lobola less than 200 head of cattle to his father Rharhabe; which number was inadequate and viewed as an insult for a daughter of a king.

Not long after Cebo's death, Rharhabe sought to revenge his son's death as well as the slight received over his daughter's lobola, that he and his army fell upon the amaQwathi and seized hundreds of their cattle. At this battle Rharhabe was fatally wounded and died. This was about the year 1787.

== Ndlambe's reign ==
Prince Ndlambe was Rharhabe's second son born in the great house, therefore next in rank to his brother Prince Mlawu. He was born in or about 1755.

Mlawu had predeceased his father having died in or about 1782, where it is said that on his wedding day to his great wife, he suddenly fell ill and died. Rharhabe installed Ndlambe as regent for the house of Mlawu, due to Mlawu having fathered two boys, Ngqika and Ntimbo before his death.

After Rharhabe death, Ngqika was chosen as the heir to the throne while Ntimbo became the great son of the Right Hand House of Mlawu, with Ndlambe their guardian.

Ndlambe reigned over the Rharhabe kingdom as regent for well over twenty years. His reign was very popular among the amaRharhabe as he was known to be a wise man and brave warrior. He is credited of being the true architect of the amaRharhabe's greatness, that within a short few years, most of the royal houses westward of the Great Kei River were under his authority.

As Ngqika came of age, he became suspicious that his uncle Ndlambe did not want to pass on the kingship to him and plotted to keep it for himself due to his popularity. Although denied by Ndlambe, this caused great tension between uncle and nephew that one day Ngqika, sometime around 1806, with the help of his father's councillors planned and executed a daring attack on Ndlambe, whose forces were caught by surprise and defeated.

Ndlambe left his great place at Ntaba kaNgqebeni on the Gqunube River which is near present-day Gonubie, with a number of followers, crossing the Great Fish River and settled in eMnyameni near present-day Alexandria. There he founded his amaNdlambe, which would once again surpass the house of Ngqika in numbers and wealth.

Ndlambe is known to have married several wives and had many sons. Ndlambe's son who was to have succeeded him died in battle and Ndlambe did not elect a successor during his lifetime. Ndlambe's other known sons were Mqhayi, Dyani, Mhala, Mxhamli, Zethu and Thuba.

Ndlambe died in February 1828.

== Mdushane's reign ==
Prince Mdushane was born in or about 1785; the eldest son of Prince Ndlambe and his first wife Princess Nojaka.

In his formative years Mdushane grew up with his uncle Cebo, as a result of Ndlambe having divorced his mother whilst she was pregnant with Mdushane. Ndlambe like his father Rharhabe, was a prince of warlike spirit that he is known to have engaged in many battles during his lifetime. After one of such battles, Ndlambe arrived home to discover that his wife, Nojaka was pregnant; and due to the lengthy period he had spent in battle, he suspected his wife of infidelity and refused to recognise the child as his own.

Ndlambe banished her and the child from his great place that she sought refuge with Ndlambe's father Rharhabe, whose great place was located near present-day Burnshill. As Mdushane grew, Cebo noticed the resemblance between the child and his brother; and having no sons of his own, adopted the boy and raised him as his own.

When Cebo died without male heirs, and as his daughters were according to Xhosa Salic law excluded from succeeding him; the councillors of that house requested Ndlambe as the Rharhabe regent to supply them with a representative of their deceased prince from among his sons. Seeing that Mdushane was already associated with that house, it was natural that he appointed Mdushane as Cebo's heir and the great son of the Right Hand House of Rharhabe.

He grew up in the same homestead as his cousin Ngqika, the future king of the amaRharhabe. The two young princes would form a close bond that would remain so until adulthood.

The relationship between Mdushane and Ngqika became strained when Ngqika abducted one of Ndlambe's young wives Thuthula, who was known for her extraordinary beauty, with the intention of making her his wife. Among the conservative Xhosa, this act was not only seen as immoral but also incestuous, that many of Ngqika's followers abandoned him and joined Ndlambe in disgust. This also proved to be a very strategic opportunity for the councillors of Ndlambe and Mdushane, who had long sought to reconcile estranged both father and son, due to Mdushane's military exploits and popularity.

Mdushane would eventually leave Burnshill and join his father's faction and thus bring with him such a large following and military strength it would enhance the position of the amaNdlambe amongst other royal houses of the frontier. This was no more evident than when the rivalry between Ngqika and Ndlambe came to a head in October 1818 at the battle of Amalinde.

The battle of Amalinde is regarded as one of the most violent and famous battles ever fought amongst the Xhosa themselves. Generally when the Xhosa fought one another, such battles did not amount to more than mere skirmishes and never became all out war where the loser was vanquished. At Amalinde, the fighting lasted the entire day where no mercy was shown even to the wounded. The sheer brutality shown to the enemy meant that a great number of deaths as never seen before occurred, where some families lost their entire male kin.

Amongst the Xhosa it is said that the real reason for this battle was not the abduction of Thuthula as some early writers have postulated, but it was caused by Ngqika having a cosy relationship with the British colonial authorities and also for pretending to speak on behalf of all Xhosa people in his dealings with the Colony.

The colonial authorities viewed Ngqika as the supreme leader of all the Xhosa, despite the Gcaleka branch being senior to him; and treated him with more deference than all Xhosa royal houses, which angered Ndlambe, Mdushane and other royals west of the Kei.

At Amalinde, the Ngqika forces were led by Ngqika's favourite son and the great son of the Right Hand House, Prince Maqoma. The amaNdlambe forces which included the amaGcaleka, imiDange, amaHleke and amaGqunukhwebe, were under the overall command of Mdushane.

At this battle Mdushane distinguished himself as a man of outstanding ability and a superior of all his contemporaries in military tactics. He outmanoeuvred Maqoma by first sending to battle his weakest regiment which he dressed up in the regalia of his strongest warriors. Mdushane leading his bravest warriors, outflanked the Ngqika forces and a bloodbath ensued. Maqoma, who was injured at the battlefront was whisked away to safety by his father's forces which undoubtedly spared his life.

After this crippling loss, Ngqika appealed to the British colonial authorities for assistance, claiming that he was only being punished by the other royal houses for his efforts and attempts at stopping cattle raiding by the Xhosa in the Colony. In December 1818, Ngqika received the aid he so long wished for in the form of Colonel Brereton, who with his troops attacked the amaNdlambe and would seize 23,000 head of cattle. Ngqika was compensated with 10,000 cattle by Brereton.

This caused great resentment amongst the Xhosa, that in April 1819, the amaNdlambe forces marched in broad daylight into the Cape Colony and descended on Grahamstown in all-out war.

Makhanda (Nxele), who was a son of a commoner, had by this time through sheer force of personally risen to become supreme wardoctor of the amaNdlambe, and managed to convince Ndlambe that with his mystical powers they would defeat the British and expel them from the Cape Colony.

With an army of about 6000 strong, the amaNdlambe under their commander-in-chief Mdushane, attacked Grahamstown with Makhanda leading a section of this army. Makhanda and his troops managed to breach the British defences and reached the army barracks where they looted weapons and supplies.

The British with a garrison of about 300 men managed with their firepower to overcome the assault and the Xhosa retreated back over the Fish River.

The war continued for several months thereafter, where the Xhosa's suffered heavy losses. Makhanda was highly sought after and pursued by the British forces who they saw as being the leading protagonist in causing the war. Under the belief it would bring the conflict to an immediate end and halt the British advance; Makhanda surrendered himself to the British, who placed him under arrest before eventually imprisoning him for life on Robben Island.

Makhanda would drown the following year while attempting to escape with other prisoners from the island.

== The family of Princess Gquma ==
Princess Nonibe, Mdushane's great wife, was the daughter of Jikwa of the Nkumba clan. Nonibe was of mixed descent and traced her lineage as a great-granddaughter of a certain white woman named Bessie (later named Gquma by the locals), who had as a child survived a shipwreck in Lambasi Bay, which is on the Wild Coast. This young woman, after being raised by the AbeLungu, would in her later years marry an Mpondo prince named Sango. Their children subsequently married into other royal families of the Xhosa Nation.

== Mdushane's family ==
In the Great House, Mdushane's heir was Prince Siwani, and his great son in the Right Hand House was Prince Qasana (Mfundisi). In the Ixhiba House (Left Hand House or Grandfather's House), a house which it is said was reintroduced by Ngqika to Xhosa lines of succession; his great son was Prince Siyolo (Matebese), who was also his eldest son.

The two princes, Qasana and Siyolo like their father and grandfather before them participated in the Cape Frontiers Wars, while Siwani refused to participate in any of the frontier conflicts and adopted a position of neutratliy.

== Mdushane's death ==
After his father's death in February 1828, Mdushane took over the reins of amaNdlambe and sought to amalgamate the Imidushane and amaNdlambe into one unified force; however no sooner had he succeeded his father that he became ill and died.

Mdushane's brother's Mqhayi and Dyani then took over the affairs of the Imidushane and AmaNdlambe respectively. This uncertainty caused another brother, Mhala, who was a junior brother born from one of the Qadi Houses (support houses) of Ndlambe to break away with some followers seeking his own independence.

Prior to his untimely death, Mdushane would in a twist of fate like his father before him, reject his great wife Nonibe and her infant son, where after he would proclaim his son Qasana as his successor.

It was customary among the Xhosa that when someone of importance became ill or some misfortune befell them, that a witchdoctor would be called upon to identify the reason for the person's malady. It was during one of these so-called "smelling out" rituals that Nonibe was identified as the person causing the great Mdushane's sickness. As with such outcomes she was to be killed and her belongings and homestead set alight.

Nonibe was to be saved from certain death by her step son Siyolo, who had recently emerged from the Xhosa custom of ulwaluko; he defied his father's orders and pleaded that she be met with no harm. Nonibe and her child were then banished from the great place.

In May 1829, this colossal of a man in the prime of his years died at his great place near the Dube stream, a tributary of the Keiskamma River. After Mdushane's death the Imidushane and amaNdlambe went into a steady decline and disintegrated into smaller sections.

According to the Missionary Rev. Stephen Kay, Mdushane and Ndlambe were one of the first Xhosa's of royal blood to welcome missionary work amongst their people, that the very place on which the missionary station in Mount Coke was built in 1825 was chosen by Kay and Mdushane, after it was sanctioned by Ndlambe.

Another Missionary Rev. Samuel Young would later write that he was present at both the funerals of Ndlambe and Mdushane where he performed the prayer at both burials and that to his knowledge, these were the first instances where members of the Xhosa Royal Family were buried in accordance with Christian rites.

== Imidushane after the death of Mdushane ==
Qasana who was Mdushane's successor was a minor at his father's death, and as was customary, he was placed under the guardianship of his uncle Mqhayi. Siwani who was Mdushane's erstwhile great son and heir, was under the guardianship of his mother Princess Nonibe, who was assisted by Siyolo in her regency.

However, when the Sixth Frontier War of 1834 broke out, a now grown Qasana defied his uncle who supported peace with the Cape Colony and decided to fight against them. This proved very costly for him, as he would have his lands confiscated by the British colonial government and lose many followers to his brother Siwani whose mother Nonibe had refused to engage in hostilities against the British with whom she claimed a shared kinship. Siyolo and his followers also joined the war, and also had their lands confiscated by the colonial government at the end of the conflict.

After the war, the Imidushane were divided under those who supported Qasana, those of Siwani and those under Siyolo. Siwani, due to his mother's neutrality was rewarded with land by the British, and because his mother enjoyed a good relationship with Governor D' Urban, he would subsequently be regarded once again as Mdushane's great son and heir.

Despite this loss of power, Qasana would fight in two more frontier wars against the Cape Colony, in 1846 and 1850 respectively. He also became involved in the cattle-killing movement of 1856-1858, where as part of the Amagogotya (Believers), he and other important Xhosa royal houses were led to believe by the young prophetesses Nongqawuse and Nonkosi to kill all the cattle and destroy their sustenance in the belief that it would sweep all European settlers in the region into the sea.

Like many other prominent actors in the cattle killing, which the colonial government believed to be a desperate ploy by the Xhosa as a pretext to another war; princes such as Maqoma, Siyolo, Phato, Mhala and Xhoxho, were arrested and sent to Robben Island. Qasana and Tola who had also been arrested along with Xhoxho and taken to a prison in King William's Town, where prisoners were held before being sent to Robben Island; managed a daring escape from this prison with their sons. Qasana and his sons Jongilanga and Mqanqeni were never to be caught, for they deserted their ancestral home and would for many years remain in hiding among the Gcaleka in Centane.

Tola and his sons were not so lucky; after a year on the run their hiding place was betrayed to Magistrate Colley in Dutywa, where they were cornered and in the ensuing battle, fought to the bitter end.

Siyolo was eventually released along with Maqoma and Mhala; where he returned to his traditional lands. During the last Cape Frontier War in 1875, Siyolo and Mhala participated in the conflict and would both be killed in battle.

Maqoma was rearrested and rebanished to Robben Island where he would eventually die of old age (75 years), bitter and alone.

Siwani, who had refused to partake in the cattle killing, would emerge after this tumultuous period in Xhosa history relatively unscathed.

== AmaNdlambe after the death of Mdushane ==
The AmaNdlambe were divided between those followers of Dyani, Mqhayi and those of Mhala. Dyani had the strongest claim to the throne of the AmaNdlambe. Mhala was however a man much loved by his father's followers and would through some intrigue accuse his brother Dyani of bewitching him after falling gravely ill. Dyani was smelt out by a witchdoctor as the person who was making Mhala sick, and fearing for his life, Dyani fled his great place leaving behind all his possession, where after Mhala was proclaimed the successor of Ndlambe and head of the AmaNdlambe.

Mhala was also a fervent supporter of the cattle killing movement which led to his arrest. Like Siyolo he would return to his old lands, where he found them totally barren. As it was a condition of his release from Robben Island that he should not seek his followers or return to his land, Mhala was once again a target for rearrest by the colonial government, however he would die in battle in the last Cape Frontier War in 1875.

== Imidushane today ==
The Imidushane of Siwani, being the Great House of Mdushane are under the leadership of Nkosi Ngubesizwe Ludwe Siwani in Tamarha, King Williamstown. The Imidushane of Qasana, being the Right Hand House of Mdushane are under the leadership of Nkosi Zwelidumile Lwanda Jongilanga in Ncera, East London.

The Imidushane have another branch stemming from the House of Qasana. Qasana's heir from the Great House was Jongilanga and his great son in the Right Hand House was Mnqanqeni. Mnqanqeni's great son from the Great House was Pikisa. This subgroup of the Imidushane is under the leadership of Nkosi Mekeni Pikisa in Centane. It is this line that completes the lineage of the Imidushane.

Siyolo's Imidushane disintegrated after his death, that his heir Bangayi was the last to rule in this house.
