= List of Xhosa chiefs =

The Xhosa nation has two independent kingships, with the Gcaleka Xhosa, being the senior branch as the Great House of King Phalo kaTshiwo and the Rharhabe Xhosa, the junior branch as the Right Hand House of King Phalo kaTshiwo. In September 2024, Yanga chief, Yanga Ntshakaza, reconnected with his Xhosa heritage and culture in a new docu-series.

- King Ahlangene Sigcawu Aa! Vulikhaya!, King of all amaXhosa and leader of amaGcaleka, Nqadu Great Place, Willowvale
- King Jonguxolo Sandile Aa! Vul'ulwandle!, King of the AmaRharhabe Xhosa, Mngqesha Great Place, King William's Town
- Chief Sisanda Sipuxolo Burns-Ncamashe, Chief AmaGwali Traditional Council, Alice
- Chief Langalivelile Mabandla Ah! Ntabayikhonjwa, Chief of AmaBhele ase Tyhume Tradition Council, Alice
- Chief Khayalethu Mqalo Ah! Gcinisizwe, Chief of AmaKhuze Traditional Council, Alice
- Chief Mzukisi Bongani Tyali "Ah!Dibanisa'hlanga" Chief of Imingcangathelo Traditional Council, Alice
- Chief Banzi Oscar Tyali “Chief of Imingcangathelo yomntla Thyume Alice
- Chief Mhlangabezi Siyasanga Tyali “Chief of Imingcangathelo yomzantsi Thyume, Alice
- Chief Xabiso Zulu Ah! Zanobuhle, Chief of AmaHlubi akwaRharhabe, Sheshegu, Alice
- Chief Langa Mavuso Ah! Zwelidumile, Chief of Gaga Traditional Council, Alice
- Chief Lwanda Siyolo Jongilanga Ah! Zwelidumile, Chief of ImiDushane Yaselwandle, Ncera Great Place, East London
- Chief Phato Ah! Zweliyandila, Chief of Amagqunukhwebe ase Lwandle, Tsholomnqa, East London
- Chieftainess Nosiseko Gaika, Chief of Amambombo (Ngqika), Keiskammahoek
- Chief Ndlovu Ulana, Chief of AmaZizi, Keiskammahoek
- Chief Richard Barney Kubashe Ah! Ntabazijongene, Chief of ImiDange, King William's Town
- Chief Ludwe Siwani Ah! Ngubesizwe, Chief of ImiDushane, Tamarha Great Place, King William's Town
- Chieftainess Nomasilakhe Komani, Chief of Imingqalasi, Bhisho
- Chief Sibulele Mhlambiso, Chief of AmaNgqika-Mbo Traditional Council, Middledrift
- Chieftainess Nombulelo Arnoria Kama, Chief of AmaGqunukhwebe Traditional Council, Middledrift
- Chief Siseko Msobomvu Maqoma, Chief of AmaJingqi Traditional Council, Seymour
- Chief Andile Makinana Ah! Mhlanganisi, Chief of AmaNdlambe Traditional Council, Tshabo
- Chief Hamilton Mxolisi Makinana Ah! Zwelihlangene, Chief of AmaHala, Peddie
- Chief Zolile Njokweni Ah! Vusuhlanga, Chief of AmaDabi, Peddie
- Chief Siviwe Bebeza Ah! Zanoxolo, Chief of AmaVundle, Ntabethemba, Queenstown
- Chief Simon Viwe Hebe Ah! Siviwe, Chief of AmaHala (Thembu), Zweledinga, Whittlesea
- Chief Xhanti Zimema, Chief of ZuluKama, Hewu, Whittlesea
- Chief Onesimo Langeni Ah! Skhosana, Chief of AmaBhele AseLangeni, Mthatha
- Prince Nadoli Mzondi Aah! Zanenyani" Prince of AmaKwai clan King Ngconde Royal Council Komga Eastern Cape

- Chief Mekeni Pikisa, Chief of ImiDushane Traditional Council, Centane
- Chief Mthandeni-maBhele Mabandla Ah! Mathandela, Chief of AmaBhele, Tsolo
- Chief Ngangomzi Pokwana Ah! Jongumhlaba, Chief of AmaZizi, DutywaAmavundle Ngoo Tyhali
- Chief Mdedeleni Ngubenani Ah! Zwelinjani, Chief of AmaTshezi, Mthonjana, Mqanduli
- Chief Mandla Mandela Ah! Zwelivelile, Chief of Mvezo Traditional Council
- Chief Sango Phathekile Holomisa Ah! Dilizintaba, Chief of AmaHegebe, Mqanduli
- Chief Mzwandile Nelson Ntsokwana, "Aah! Zwelivumile", Chief of Amagcina, Ncora, Cofimvaba, Eastern Cape
- Chief Manonwana Mpangele, Ah! Zwelixolile, Chief of AmaGcina, Lady Frere, Eastern Cape
- Chief Samuel Siganeko, Ah!Jolirhamba, Chief of AmaGcina, Lady Frere, Eastern Cape
- Chief Zwelakhe Dalasile, Aah! Zwelakhe, Chief of AmaQwathi, Engcobo, Eastern Cape
- Chief Zululiyazongoma Mnqanqeni, " Aah Zululiyazongoma" Chief of Abathembu tribe, Engcobo, Clarkebury.
- Chief Dumisani Mgudlwa, Aah ! Zwelenqaba, Chief of amaJumba, Engcobo
- Chief Claude Msutu Ah! Zwelinzima, of the Msutu Clan of the Amazizi Tribe Qeto Great Place, Peddie, Eastern Cape
- Chief Ntombizodwa Msutu Ah! Zanokhanyo, of the Amazizi tribe Qeto Great Place, Peddie, Eastern Cape
- Chief Nkosinathi Jezile Aah! Daluxolo Chief of Amagcina tribe Engcobo Sinqumeni Great Place
- Chief Viwe Mdalu ka Xabadiya Aa!! Bhungaliwile INkosi enkulu kumazizi akawalamyeni (Mbolompo Great Place) Mthatha
- Regent Nkosi (kazi) Nondumiso Pumela Ngonyama "Aah Nobongo", Regent Senior Traditional Leader of Cacadu Traditional Authority, Mpunzana Great Place, Mthatha
- Chief Sibongile Dumalisile, Chief of Jingqi Traditional Council, Willowvale
- Chief Matshawonke Mtoto, Chief of Mtoto Traditional Council, Willowvale
- Chief Msondezi Sigcawu, Chief of Kwa Mkoloza Traditional Council, Willowvale
- Chief Luyanda Magxwalisa, Ah!Vulisango, the Chief of Mevana Traditional Council, Willowvale
- Chief Xhanti Sigcawu, Chief of Mbashe Traditional Council, Dutywa
- Chief Mzubanzi Wellington Jali, Chief of ImiQhayi Traditional Council, Peddie
- Chief Mzimasi Tyali, Chief of Anta Traditional Council, Seymour
- Chief Bongani Gecelo, Aah Zwelandile (CaLa)
- Chief Melisizwe Mhlontlo, Aaah Thandisizwe, Chief of AmaGcina, Lady Frere, Eastern Cape.
- Prince Cwenga Buhle Jezile, Ahh !! ZWELIDUMILE, Prince of AmaGcina Sinqumeni great place Engcobo. Eastern Cape.
- Chief Zwelenkosi Dalasile.Ahh Zwelenkosi !! Chief of AmaQwathi.AmaQwathi Traditional Council Nkondlo Great Place, Ngcobo Eastern cape
- Chief Zwelenqaba Dimisani Mgudlwa of amaDlomo at Qhumanco Falo Mgudlwa.
- Chief Mnumzana Rasmeni AHH Jongumhlaba Chief Of Madotyeni Traditional Council of Amangxongo Royal House Engcobo Eastern Cape.
- Chief Zweloxolo Stokwe Ahh Zweloxolo!!! Chief of AmaQwathi Nation in Western Thembuland kingdom in Cala Seplan Great Place Eastern Cape.
- Chief Noyi-Balfour Chief of AmaKwai clan,King Ngconde Royal Council Centane Eastern Cape.

== See also ==
- Gcaleka
- Rharhabe
- List of rulers of the Gcaleka
- List of rulers of the Rharhabe
- List of Xhosa Kings
- List of Xhosa people
