= List of Xhosa kings =

The royal house of AmaTshawe is the oldest royal family in South Africa. They trace their ancestry back to Xhosa, a mythical figure who led the Nguni clans to near Dedesi river, conquering and displacing the local Khoi clans resident. The first rulers of a unified Xhosa federation were the amaTshawe clan who conquered neighbouring Nguni chiefdoms to form the first Xhosa Federation near Mzimkhulu.

The Ama-Xhosa-Kingdom Since its foundation from:1040ad till today

King Sikhumbulo KaSibhakabhaka

King Khungube KaSikhumbulo

King Mithiyonke KaKhungube

King Mabhudule (Mnguni) KaMithiyonke

King Malangana (Xhosa) KaMabhudule (Mnguni)

[=Reigned-from:1096ad until 1146ad=]

King Lubhabhana KaMalangana

[=Reigned-from:1146ad until 1193ad=]

King Dlakuzana (Dlakaza) KaLubhabhana

[=Reigned-from:1193ad until 1234ad=]

King Khubambe KaDlakuzana

[=Reigned-from:1234ad until 1282ad=]

King Mhlamawele KaKhubambe

[=Reigned-from:1282ad until 1325ad=]

King Xhaphane KaMhlamawele

[=Reigned-from:1325ad until 1370ad=]

King Mhlabangobe KaXhaphane

[=Reigned-from:1370ad until 1412ad=]

King Ngcwangube KaMhlabangobe

[=Reigned-from:1412ad until 1458ad=]

King Nkosiyane KaNgcwangube

(+Born:1412ad - Died:1502ad+)

[=Reigned-from:1458ad until 1502ad=]

King Nkosiyamntu KaNkosiyane

(+Born:1454ad - Died:1540ad+)

[=Reigned-from:1502ad until 1540ad=]

King Tshawe KaNkosiyamntu

(+Born:1498ad - Died:1576ad+)

[=Reigned-from:1540ad until 1576ad=]

King Ngcwangule KaTshawe

(+Born:1525ad - Died:1606ad+)

[=Reigned-from:1576ad until 1606ad=]

King Sikhomo KaNgcwangule

(+Born:1553ad - Died:1630ad+)

[=Reigned-from:1606ad until 1630ad=]

King Togu KaSikhomo

(+Born:1575ad - Died:1658ad+)

[=Reigned-from:1630ad until 1658ad=]

King Ngconde KaTogu

(+Born:1606ad - Died:1693ad+)

[=Reigned-from:1658ad until 1693ad=]

King Tshiwo KaNgconde

(+Born:1630ad - Died:1715ad+)

[=Reigned-from:1693ad until 1715ad=]

King Phalo KaTshiwo

(+Born:1702ad - Died:1755ad+)

[=Reigned-from:1722ad until 1755ad=]

King Gcaleka KaPhalo

(+Born:1728ad - Died:1778ad+)

[=Reigned-from:1755ad until 1778ad=]

King Khawutha KaGcaleka

(+Born:1750ad - Died:1805ad+)

[=Reigned-from:1778ad until 1805ad=]

King Hintsa KaKhawutha

(+Born:1787ad - Died:1835ad+)

[=Reigned-from:1810ad until 1835ad=]

King Sarhili KaHintsa

(+Born:1810ad - Died:1885ad+)

[=Reigned-from:1835ad until 1885ad=]

King Sigcawu KaSarhili

(+Born:1840ad - Died:1902ad+)

[=Reigned-from:1885ad until 1902ad=]

King Gwabinkumbi KaSigcawu

(+Born:1864ad - Died:1921ad+)

[=Reigned-from:1902ad until 1921ad=]

King Ngangomhlaba KaGwabinkumbi

(+Born:1890ad - Died:1933ad+)

[=Reigned-from:1923ad until 1933ad=]

King Zwelidumile KaGwabinkumbi

(+Born:1906ad - Died:1965ad+)

[=Reigned-from:1933ad until 1965ad=]

King Xolilizwe KaZwelidumile

(+Born:1925ad - Died:2005ad+)

[=Reigned-from:1965ad until 2005ad=]

King Zwelonke KaXolilizwe

(+Born:1968ad - Died:2019ad+)

[=Reigned-from:2005ad until 2019ad=]

King Vulikhaya KaXolilizwe

- the current monarch*

(+Born:1970ad - Alive:Aging+)

[=Reigning-since:2020ad until present day=]

== Xhosa Kingship line ==
Mithiyonke
Nguni
Malangana
Nkosiyane
Liwana	Nkosiyamntu
Cirha	Tshawe	Jwarha	Qwambe
Ngcwangu
Sikhomo
Togu
Ngconde	Ntinde
Gando	Tshiwo	Mdange
Gwali	Phalo
Gcaleka	Rharhabe
Khawuta Aa! Khala!	Nqoko	Mlawu (he never became a king because he died before his father)	Ndlambe Aa! Ndabanduna!
Hintsa Aa! Zanzolo!	Ngqika Aa! Lwaganda!	Mdushane
Sarhili Aa! Krili!	Sandile Aa! Mgolombane!	Maqoma Aa! Jongumsomvu!
Sigcawu	Gonya Aa! Sigonyela!
Gwebinkumbi Aa! Gwebinkumbi!	Daliza	Faku (Not to be confused with the Amampondo King)
Mpisekhaya Aa! Ngangomhlaba!	Zwelidumile Aa! Zwelidumile!	Velile Aa! Velile!
Xolilizwe Aa! Xolilizwe!	Mxolisi Aa! Bazindlovu!
Zwelonke Aa! Zwelonke!	Ahlangene Aa! Vulikhaya!	Maxhob'ayakhawuleza Aa! Zanesizwe!
Jonguxolo Aa! Vululwandle!
