= AmaNdlambe =

Xhosa Principality

The AmaNdlambe or the Ndlambe is a Xhosa principality located in the Eastern Cape, South Africa. Founded by Prince Ndlambe, son of King Rharhabe and grandson of King Phalo, Ndlambe's advisors and strong army were known as the 'AmaNdlambe'. Prince Ndlambe was also the uncle of King Hintsa.

== History of the chiefdom ==
Ndlambe was the second born son from Great-King Rharhabe's great wife Queen Nojoli of the AbaThembu. Rharhabe's heir who was to be the ruler of his Great House following his demise was Prince Mlawu. It is said that on the day that Mlawu was to marry his great wife Nobutho, he suddenly became ill and died. However, on his death Mlawu had fathered two sons out of wedlock i.e. Ngqika and Ntimbo.

When King Rharhabe died in battle, Ndlambe was requested by the councillors of deceased Mlawu to provide them with an heir for the Great House. Ndlambe knowing that his brother had fathered two sons, sought out the two boys in order that one would rule over the Rharhabe House. Indeed, the two children were found and thus the sons of his deceased elder brother were brought by the councillors to Ndlambe's kraal to select a successor.

It became apparent that Ndlambe favoured Ngqika over Ntimbo; although Ntimbo appeared the eldest of the two, he exhibited a sickly disposition. The councillors of Mlawu favoured Ntimbo, as it would enhance their own powers over the Great House if Ntimbo were to succeed the kingship.

This dispute was referred to the Great House of the Xhosa Kingdom, to be decided by the King Khawuta. Whilst a delegation was sent to King Khawuta to formally request his assistance; Ndlambe sent an informal party to the king requesting that Ngqika be selected new ruler of the AmaRharhabe. In preparation for the arrival of the king, festivities lasting several days commenced where the two young princes were fêted. When King Khawuta arrived and having received word from Ndlambe on the suitability of one of the two young princes by the name of Ngqika; King Khawuta accompanied by his councillors, did not even utter a word but merely got off his horse, bestowed Ngqika around his neck with a string of royal beads, got back on his horse and left. The simple gesture by the king laid the whole matter to rest and Ngqika became ruler of the House of Rharhabe.

During the minority of Ngqika, Ndlambe became regent, assisted at times by the young Prince's mother Yese; a woman largely known for her salacious appetite in men and would in later years have a negative influence to her son's reign. She had a notorious sexual relationship with the colourful Afrikaaner interpreter Coenraad de Buys, which did not sit well within the conservative Xhosa society.

Ndlambe was a popular and much loved regent having seen a great expansion and rise in the fortunes of the AmaRharhabe. He ruled as regent for a period spanning over twenty years, and is viewed by some historians as the main architect of their greatness.

As Ndlambe was teaching the young Ngqika the art of being a fine ruler, Ngqika who now had just emerged from the Xhosa custom of ukwaluka, sought to take the sovereignty from his uncle by force, suspected to have been at the influence of his mother Yese and his father's old councillors, who had hinted to the impressionable young Prince that Ndlambe sought to usurp his throne.

As the tensions grew, Ndlambe left the great place which at the time was located at Xhukwane, Debe Nek with his councillors and a number of followers loyal to him and settled at Xuxuwa near today Fort Beaufort.

Shortly thereafter, as Ndlambe's popularity grew, Ngqika overcome with jealousy led an unwarranted and surprise attack on Ndlambe (who at the time was building his own principality), where he defeated Ndlambe's forces. Ndlambe escaped unscathed and went to hide amongst his mother's people the AbaThembu of Ndungwana at Ngqamakhwe.

Ndlambe appealed to the AbaThembu to assist him against his volatile nephew, but only received help from the regent of the Xhosa Kingdom Nqoko; at the time the Xhosa King, King Khawuta had died and his heir Hintsa was still a young boy. The two armies met at Tyusha near the Cwengcwe, where the Nqoko's forces were routed by the amaNgqika forces and Ngqika captured Ndlambe and Hintsa as his prisoners and kept them as prisoners at Ndlambe's sister Ntsusa's homestead near the Rhabula River.

The Great House of the Xhosa Kingdom also moved out of their territory near Ngxingxolo across the Kei River to present day Willowvale, where the Xhosa monarch is still found today.

Hintsa managed to escape from captivity and crossed the Kei River to the great delight of his countrymen. Ndlambe, although a prisoner, was allowed free movement by Ngqika that three of his young wives Thuthula, Noyena, and Nojico were allowed to join him. Ngqika would also from time to time consult his uncle and request his presence on matters of state.

Ndlambe was finally rescued with his wives from captivity with the assistance of Prince Chungwa of the Gqunukwebe and settled near Chungwa's great place in Mnyameni. As Ndlambe was much feared and respect, his former army, councillors and many of his loyal subjects soon followed him to Mnyameni.

It is then that the AmaNdlambe principality was re-established and would grow to surpass the house of Ngqika in number and strength.

In 1819, the AmaNdlambe were party to the Battle of Grahamstown. Simmering tensions and accusations of cattle theft led to the unsuccessful assault by 4,000 to 10,000 Xhosa warriors on a garrison of several hundred British troops.
