= Sigcawu =

Sigcawu is a South African surname that may refer to

- Sigcawu ka Sarili (died 1902), South African Royal
- Daliza Sigcawu, South African royalty son of Sigcawu
- Salukaphathwa Gwebi'nkumbi Sigcawu (died 1921), South African royal and son of Sigcawu
- Mpisekhaya Ngangomhlaba Sigcawu (died 1933), South African royalty and grandson of Sigcawu
- Bungeni Zwelidumile Sigcawu (1906–1965), South African Xhosa King and grandson of Sigcawu
- Xolilizwe Mzikayise Sigcawu (1926–2005), South African Xhosa King and descendant of Sigcawu
- Zwelonke Sigcawu (1968–2019), South African Xhosa King and descendant of Sigcawu
- Ahlangene Sigcawu (born 1970), South African Xhosa King and descendant of Sigcawu
- Alice Sigcawu (born 1952), South African politician
