= Luzuko Matiwane =

King of AmaMpondomise

King Zwelozuko (Luzuko Matiwane; born 1978) is the King of AmaMpondomise in Qumbu and the son of King Loyiso Matiwane and Queen Nolitha, the sister of AmaRharhabe King Maxhob'ayakhawuleza Sandile.

== Life ==
He is maternal cousin to AmaRharhabe King Jonguxolo Sandile.
He was declared as AmaMpondomise King after AmaMpondomise were stripped of their status by the Union of South Africa in 1904 after King Mhlontlo was accused of killing a Qumbu magistrate, Hamilton Hope, and two white police officers during the Mpondomise Revolt in 1880–81. Although Mhlontlo was acquitted of the murder charge, he lost his kingship by administrative action. The AmaMpondomise nation's hopes were again dashed during the democratic dispensation when the Nhlapo Commission found in 2005 that they had no claim to a kingship. However, a 115-year battle, for this anti-colonial nation, to get their king and kingdom reinstalled and reinstated respectively, ended when the Eastern Cape High Court (Mthatha) officially recognised the AmaMpondomise's kingship. It ordered that the kingship be reinstated. With the presiding judge setting aside the Tolo Commission's decision to oppose the AmaMpondomise's claim of kingship.

His coronation was delayed by Dosini cousins who were also claiming the kingdom to themselves but lost court case against Matiwane's kingship rights. Whilst the legally recognized kingship now resides with the Matiwane Royal House, the ooBhukwana clan of Mpindweni, Mthatha, continues to be revered by many as being of royal blood. This is in recognition of the pivotal leadership and custodianship they provided to the AmaMpondomise nation during the 115-year period when the kingship was in abeyance. The clan's legacy is carried by the late Nkosi Masibulele Mtebeni, and his descendants, Princess Mesuli Qokweni-Mtebeni and Prince Mikuso Qokweni-Mtebeni. Amongst iziduko of the Bhukwana clan are: ooMbarha, Mtshobo, Phaphulengonyama, Into ezingaphathwa mntu ngoba zizinkosi ngokwazo. Meaning "Those that cannot be touched by a person because they are kings themselves" this shows that ooBhukwana are royalty by birth and direct descendants of the great King Mpondomise.
