= Ngqushwa Local Municipality elections =

Local elections in the Eastern Cape, South Africa

The Ngqushwa Local Municipality council (within the South African Amathole District Municipality) consists of twenty-one members elected by mixed-member proportional representation. Eleven are elected by first-past-the-post voting in eleven wards, while the remaining ten are chosen from party lists so that the total number of party representatives is proportional to the number of votes received.

In the election of 4 November 2026 the African National Congress (ANC) won a majority of fifteen seats.

== Results ==
The following table shows the composition of the council after past elections.

Event	ANC	DA	EFF	Other	Total
2000 election	26	—	—	1	27
2006 election	26	1	—	0	27
2011 election	24	1	—	0	25
2016 election	20	1	2	0	23
2021 election	18	1	3	1	23
2026 election	15	1	1	4	21

== December 2000 election ==
The following table shows the results of the 2000 election.

Party	Ward			List			Total seats
Party	Votes	%	Seats	Votes	%	Seats	Total seats
African National Congress	1,694	90.69	14	21,826	95.88	12	26
United Democratic Movement	174	9.31	0	939	4.12	1	1
Total	1,868	100.00	14	22,765	100.00	13	27
Valid votes	1,868	97.85		22,765	97.59		
Invalid/blank votes	41	2.15		561	2.41		
Total votes	1,909	100.00		23,326	100.00		
Registered voters/turnout	41,820	4.56		41,820	55.78		

== March 2006 election ==
The following table shows the results of the 2006 election.

Party	Ward			List			Total seats
Party	Votes	%	Seats	Votes	%	Seats	Total seats
African National Congress	11,726	83.41	14	23,393	96.51	12	26
Independent candidates	2,050	14.58	0				0
Democratic Alliance	282	2.01	0	847	3.49	1	1
Total	14,058	100.00	14	24,240	100.00	13	27
Valid votes	14,058	97.98		24,240	95.42		
Invalid/blank votes	290	2.02		1,164	4.58		
Total votes	14,348	100.00		25,404	100.00		
Registered voters/turnout	43,660	32.86		43,660	58.19		

== May 2011 election ==
The following table shows the results of the 2011 election.

Party	Ward			List			Total seats
Party	Votes	%	Seats	Votes	%	Seats	Total seats
African National Congress	18,044	96.00	13	18,200	95.44	11	24
Democratic Alliance	215	1.14	0	618	3.24	1	1
Pan Africanist Congress of Azania	536	2.85	0	252	1.32	0	0
Total	18,795	100.00	13	19,070	100.00	12	25
Valid votes	18,795	95.65		19,070	97.04		
Invalid/blank votes	854	4.35		582	2.96		
Total votes	19,649	100.00		19,652	100.00		
Registered voters/turnout	42,100	46.67		42,100	46.68		

== August 2016 election ==
The following table shows the results of the 2016 election.

Party	Ward			List			Total seats
Party	Votes	%	Seats	Votes	%	Seats	Total seats
African National Congress	17,686	80.69	12	19,199	88.13	8	20
Economic Freedom Fighters	1,662	7.58	0	1,830	8.40	2	2
Independent candidates	1,865	8.51	0				0
Democratic Alliance	572	2.61	0	638	2.93	1	1
Pan Africanist Congress of Azania	133	0.61	0	119	0.55	0	0
Total	21,918	100.00	12	21,786	100.00	11	23
Valid votes	21,918	98.07		21,786	97.78		
Invalid/blank votes	432	1.93		495	2.22		
Total votes	22,350	100.00		22,281	100.00		
Registered voters/turnout	38,945	57.39		38,945	57.21		

== November 2021 election ==
The following table shows the results of the 2021 election.

Party	Ward			List			Total seats
Party	Votes	%	Seats	Votes	%	Seats	Total seats
African National Congress	13,752	74.66	11	14,561	81.29	7	18
Economic Freedom Fighters	1,849	10.04	0	2,245	12.53	3	3
Independent candidates	2,057	11.17	1				1
Democratic Alliance	448	2.43	0	517	2.89	1	1
African Transformation Movement	247	1.34	0	355	1.98	0	0
Independent South African National Civic Organisation	67	0.36	0	235	1.31	0	0
Total	18,420	100.00	12	17,913	100.00	11	23
Valid votes	18,420	97.86		17,913	95.27		
Invalid/blank votes	403	2.14		889	4.73		
Total votes	18,823	100.00		18,802	100.00		
Registered voters/turnout	35,846	52.51		35,846	52.45		

=== By-elections from November 2021 ===
The following by-elections were held to fill vacant ward seats in the period since November 2021.

Date	Ward	Party of the previous councillor	Party of the newly elected councillor
16 Jul 2025	11	Independent Candidate	African National Congress

== November 2026 election ==
The following table shows the results of the 2026 election.

Party	Ward			List			Total seats
Party	Votes	%	Seats	Votes	%	Seats	Total seats
African National Congress	12,934	67.90	11	13,323	70.45	4	15
South African Communist Party	1,875	9.84	0	2,253	11.91	2	2
Economic Freedom Fighters	1,109	5.82	0	1,201	6.35	1	1
Democratic Alliance	585	3.07	0	635	3.36	1	1
Independent candidates	1,057	5.55	0				0
Pan Africanist Congress of Azania	444	2.33	0	477	2.52	1	1
Afrika Mayibuye Movement	327	1.72	0	320	1.69	1	1
African Independent Congress	364	1.91	0	208	1.10	0	0
African Transformation Movement	191	1.00	0	246	1.30	0	0
uMkhonto weSizwe Party	126	0.66	0	173	0.91	0	0
Al Jama-ah	32	0.17	0	40	0.21	0	0
African Movement Congress	4	0.02	0	36	0.19	0	0
Total	19,048	100.00	11	18,912	100.00	10	21
Valid votes	19,048	97.57		18,912	97.23		
Invalid/blank votes	474	2.43		538	2.77		
Total votes	19,522	100.00		19,450	100.00		
Registered voters/turnout	38,001	51.37		38,001	51.18		
