= Ringo Madlingozi =

South African musician and politician

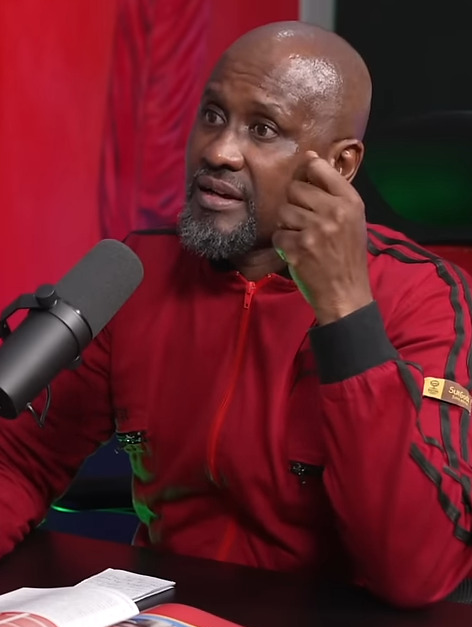
- Madlingozi in 2024

Member of the National Assembly of South Africa
- In office 22 May 2019 – 21 August 2024
- Constituency: Eastern Cape

Personal details
- Born: Sindile Madlingozi; 12 December 1964 (age 61) Peddie, Eastern Cape, South Africa
- Party: Economic Freedom Fighters
- Occupation: Singer; songwriter; record producer; politician
- Musical career
- Genres: Afro Soul; R&B
- Instruments: Vocals; guitar
- Years active: 1986-present
- Label: Electromode
- Website: www.madlingozi.co.za

Ringo Madlingozi (born 12 December 1964) is a South African singer, songwriter, record producer and a former member of the National Assembly of South Africa. Madlingozi rose to fame when he and his band Peto won the Shell Road to Fame contest in 1986. He later formed a group called Gecko Moon with Alan Cameron, a fellow Peto member.

== Early life ==
Madlingozi was born in Peddie, Eastern Cape. A chance encounter with producer and head of Island Records, Chris Blackwell, changed the course of Madlingozi's creative life. "Blackwell chided me for not sticking to what I know best – my people, my language and my culture," Madlingozi said. "It was as if a bright light had been turned on in my mind and this led directly to the recording of my debut album, Vukani."

The album marked a new direction for Madlingozi. Literally meaning "Wake Up", the album firmly rooted Madlingozi in the African pop genre, giving expression to the "ukuxhentsa" rhythms that had inspired the singer in his youth when he used to listen to "amagqirha" or traditional healers in his neighbourhood and appreciate their rhythms. The addition of a contemporary sound whilst still being grounded in the tradition of the Xhosa guitar, cemented what has now become known as the "Ringo" sound. The sound has found its expression in several other releases, each one building on the success of the last.

== Career ==
=== Music ===
Madlingozi later formed a group called Gecko Moon with Alan Cameron, a fellow Peto member. Their popular hit was "Green-Green", which was a crossover track and was well received by music lovers.

Madlingozi's debut solo album, Vukani, sold tens of thousands of copies.

He has subsequently received multiple awards for his albums at the South African Music Awards (SAMA) and the Kora Awards, where, among others, he won the Best Male Artist in Southern Africa and the African continent Awards. He collaborated with international acclaimed group UB40 as part of the United Nations Global AIDS awareness program, recording the Xhosa lyrics of "Cover Up".

=== Politics ===
In May 2019, Madlingozi was sworn in as a Member of Parliament in the sixth administration of the democratic government of the Republic of South Africa.

In June 2018, Madlingozi drew criticism for publicly supporting Julius Malema’s controversial remarks that the majority of South Africa's Indian and coloured communities are racist towards black South Africans. His comments, made on social media, echoed Malema's assertions and were based on Madlingozi's own experiences of racism while growing up in Cape Town. Madlingozi criticised the media for dismissing Malema’s statements as "rhetoric," accusing journalists of distorting uncomfortable truths and prioritising personal biases over informing the public. His defence of Malema sparked a polarised response, with some praising his candour and others condemning the generalisations.

== Artistic influences ==
Madlingozi's vocal hero is Victor Ndlazilwane. Many upcoming artists like Nathi Mankayi and Vusi Nova have been influenced by Madlingnozi.

== Philanthropy work ==
Ringo Madlingozi is involved in community outreach, supporting centres like Takalani Home for the Disabled, Sinethemba Home, Van Rijn Place of Safety, Siyazigabisa Home of Hope, and Enkuselweni Place of Safety. His contributions include financial aid, donations, benefit concerts, music training, and mentoring children. At Sinethemba, he takes a parental role, guiding children and assisting with school events. In Durban, he co-founded the Adopt a Child Project, supporting orphans, and has been an ambassador for HIV/AIDS and anti-abuse campaigns. He also collaborates with Khuluma Ndoda, an anti-women abuse initiative.

Madlingozi appeared on the third one-off TV special of quiz show Test the Nation, entitled National Parenting Test, as a celebrity guest.

== Discography ==
- Vukani (1996)
- Sondelani (1997)
- Mamelani (1998)
- Into Yam' (1999)
- Buyisa (2000)
- Ntumba (2002)
- Baleka (2004)
- Ndim'lo (2006)
- Qhubeka (2008)
- Jayiva Sbali (2010)
- The Coming Of Dawn (2012)
- Vukani (2014)
- Ikhwelo (2025)
- Love songs (2006)
- Ringo Live DVD (2003)
- Ringo Live CD (2003)

== Awards and nominations ==
| Year | Award | Category | Recipient/Nominated Work | Result |
|---|---|---|---|---|
| 1999 | South African Music Awards | Best Male Vocalist | Ringo Madlingozi | Won |
| 1999 | Kora Awards | Best Artist from Southern Africa | Ringo Madlingozi | Won |
| 2004 | South African Music Awards | Best Afro Pop Album | Baleka | Won |
| 2015 | South African Music Awards | | Ringo Madlingozi | Won |
| 2024 | South African Music Awards | Himself | Lifetime Achievement Awards | Won |
