= Mamani kaPhahlo =

Queen Mamani of the AmaMpondomise

Queen Mamani KaPhahlo

Monarch of the Mpondomise people
- Reign: 1732 To 1758
- Predecessor: King Phahlo (father)
- Successor: King Sonthlo (Brother)
- Born: c. 1702
- Died: 1758
- Spouse: Princess Ntsibatha of the (Mpondo)
- Issue: None
- Dynasty: AmaCirha
- Father: Phahlo
- Mother: Princess of the Xesibe
- Religion: Ancestral Worship

Queen Mamani kaPhahlo (c. 1702-1758) was a queen of the AmaMpondomise Kingdom from 1732 to 1758, following after her father, King Phahlo. She is also known as Queen Mbingwa. As the eldest among three daughters of the Great Wife of King Phahlo, she successfully challenged her half-brothers from the smaller houses for the throne upon the death of her father. She married Princess Ntsibatha, a Mpondo princess, she died in May 1758 without any heirs to the throne. She was succeeded by one of her brothers, King Sonthlo, who she installed in her position despite challenges from Within the royal family members at that time

== Early life and family ==
Queen Mamani (sometimes called Mbingwa) was born to King Phahlo and a Xesibe Princess whose name is not known. Queen Mamani's mother was the Great Wife.

One of Queen Mamani's sisters, Princess Thandela, married into the AmaXhosa Nation King Phalo and was the mother of King Gcaleka. Prince Gcaleka later became the King of the Xhosas. Not much is known about the other sister.

== Ascending to the throne and reign ==
In the year 1732 Queen Mamani's father, King Phahlo, passed on. Traditionally her father was meant to be succeeded by a child of the Great Wife. However, custom dictated that the heir needed to be a male heir. If the Great Wife did not have male children, like Queen Mamani's mother, then a male heir would be searched for among the children of the other wives, starting with the wife married to the king for the longest (most senior wife) followed by the junior wives (according to their seniority), until a son is found. If a son is not found, then one of the king's brothers would be king (preference given to the oldest brother and his male descendants, then moving down to the youngest brother) would assume the position of king.

However the Great Wife of King Phahlo did not have any male children. Defying tradition and custom, as the eldest of the three daughters of King Phahlo's Great Wife, Queen Mamani ascended the throne upon the death of her father.

When dissenters rose against her, she killed them. She mounted armies against those who challenged her authority too. Her reign was felt throughout the lands of the AmaMpondomise Nation (from Umtata to Umzimkhulu.

== Marriage ==
Despite being a woman herself, Queen Mamani married a princess from the AmaMpondo kingdom, the daughter of King Nyawuza called Princess Ntsibatha. Instead of consummating the marriage herself, she asked her brother, who was Prince Sonthlo at the time, to do it for her. Prince Sonthlo was the son of Queen Mamani's maternal aunt and Queen Mamani's father, King Phahlo's wife.

== Successor ==
Gradually she began to hand over monarchal duties to King Sonthlo while she actively influenced the successful transition of power to him. Thus, Sontlo became her successor while she was alive and continued to reign upon her death.

Preceded by King Phahlo	Mpondomise Queen 1732 To 1758	Succeeded by King Sonthlo
