= Nompumelelo Hospital =

- Eastern Cape Department of Health

Geography
- Location: Peddie, Amathole District Municipality, Eastern Cape, South Africa
- Coordinates: 33°12′24″S 27°07′54″E

Organisation
- Care system: Public
- Type: Community

Services
- Emergency department: Yes

Links
- Website: Nompumelelo Hospital
- Other links: List of hospitals in South Africa

Nompumelelo Hospital is a Provincial government funded hospital for the Ngqushwa Local Municipality area in Peddie, Eastern Cape in South Africa.

The hospital departments include Emergency department, Paediatric ward, Maternity ward, Obstetrics, Gynaecology Services, Out Patients Department, Surgical Services, Medical Services, Operating Theatre & CSSD Services, Pharmacy, Anti-Retroviral (ARV) treatment for HIV/AIDS, Post Trauma Counseling Services, Physiotherapy, Occupational Services, Laboratory Services, X-ray Services, Laundry Services and Kitchen Services.
