= Rharhabe =

Second senior house of the Xhosa Kingdom

The Rharhabe House is the second senior house (Right Hand House) of the Xhosa Kingdom. Its royal palace is in the former Ciskei and its counterpart in the former Transkei is the Gcaleka, which is the great house of Phalo.

The Rharhabe house was founded by Xhosa warrior Rharhabe, who was the older brother of Gcaleka ka Phalo.

== History of the Rharhabe ==
The Xhosa royal blood line stretches from King Xhosa, who fathered Malangana, who fathered Nkosiyamntu, who fathered Tshawe, who fathered Ngcwangu, who fathered Sikhomo, who fathered Togu, who fathered Ngconde, who fathered Tshiwo, who fathered Phalo.

The reason the Xhosa nation is governed by two houses can be traced to the time of King Phalo, who had both his intended wives arriving on the same day for their wedding, as he had already paid lobola for one from the Mpondo royal family, and for one from the Thembu royal family. In Xhosa tradition, the first wife, as declared on arrival, would be the one whose sons would be heirs to the throne. This situation caused a great dilemma and a great outcry – some called this the ancestors' punishment – because a first wife could not be declared. As the two young princesses were of equal status, by choosing one as the Great Wife, King Phalo stood to offend the father of the other. This dilemma was solved by a wise old man called Majeke, who said: "What is greater than the head of the king, and what is stronger than his right hand? Let the one be the head wife and the other the wife of the right hand".

So a secondary yet autonomous house was then created, being the Right Hand House. The Mpondo princess was chosen as his Great Wife and the Thembu princess as his Right Hand Wife. So there was a Right Hand House and the Great House.

Phalo had two sons, Rharhabe, the eldest son born from his Right Hand House and Gcaleka, born from the Great House.

Rharhabe was by birth older than Gcaleka having been born around 1722, with Gcaleka born in 1730. Rharhabe displayed signs of bravery and wisdom from a very young age, traits which made him by far the superior of Phalo's sons. This caused great friction between the brothers, as Gcaleka feared that his brother with his popularity may one day seek to claim the throne for himself. After Gcaleka had reached manhood, conflict arose when Gcaleka tried to usurp the throne from his father but failed.

Rharhabe who had assisted his father against his brother's designs for the throne, decided to leave Phalo's Great Place with a group of followers and crossed the Kei River and settled at Amabele, near present-day Stutterheim. This move had the blessing of Phalo, as he accompanied his son in his search for a new home.

On arrival in these new lands, Rharhabe encountered the KhoiKhoi (whom the Dutch named the Hottentots) and against whom fierce battles were fought over cattle and land. In the end and after killing the KhoiKhoi leader Hinsati, Rharhabe reached an amicable arrangement and negotiated with Hinsati's widow, Queen Hoho, for sale of land between the Keiskamma and Buffalo rivers. The Amathole Forests and Hoho Hills between Middledrift and King William's Town were also sold to Rharhabe. Thus, the Xhosa monarchy was, and still is, divided into the amaGcaleka and the amaRharhabe kingdoms.

Rharhabe's children from his great wife Nojoli kaNdungwana of the Thembu were Ntsusa kaRharhabe (daughter), Mlawu kaRharhabe (his great son), Ndlambe kaRharhabe, Nukwa kaRharhabe and Khinzela kaRharhabe (daughter). In the Right Hand House, he fathered Cebo kaRharhabe who died without male heirs, but whose house was placed under Mdushane, Ndlambe's eldest son, to be the successor of Cebo.

Rharhabe's other sons were Mnyaluza kaRharhabe, Siko kaRharhabe, Sigcawu kaRarabe, Nzwane kaRharhabe and Hlahla kaRharhabe.

In 1782, his great son Mlawu kaRharhabe died, but he had fathered two boys, Ngqika and Ntimbo, who were infants at their father's death. Mlawu's councillors (amaphakathi) were then placed under Ndlambe who became regent for the young Ngqika.

Rharhabe's daughter Ntsusa married the Qwathi chief Mdandala, who as dowry (lobola) sent a miserable hundred head of cattle to Rharhabe. This was seen by Rharhabe as a great insult for someone of his stature, so that he sent his Right Hand son Cebo to Thembuland to demand more cattle. When Cebo arrived at Mdandala's homestead to demand the cattle as instructed by Rharhabe, the Qwathis fell upon this prince and killed him.

These events enraged Rharhabe so that he at once entered Thembuland to remedy the affront at the tip of an assegai (spear). War broke out where Rharhabe scattered the Thembus and seized many of their cattle. But at the skirmish near the Xuka River, Rharhabe was fatally wounded and died. This battle is estimated to have occurred around 1787.

Rharhabe's grave is near present-day Dohne in the Eastern Cape Province.

== Ciskei ==
The Xhosa people had held out against colonial invaders for more than a century, longer than any other Southern African anti-colonial resistance. With the Apartheid government's policy of re-tribalisation, and the creation of the Ciskei Bantustan, a political rivalry between the Rharhabe and the Fengu-who had traditionally been better educated and tended to hold salaried positions-arose. This culminated in the election of Rharhabe Lennox Sebe as leader of the territory in 1973, although Sebe subsequently abandoned his anti-Fengu rhetoric.

== The Rharhabe today ==
The titular head of the Rharhabe kingdom is King Jonguxolo Sandile, Aah Vululwandle, who became king after the sudden passing in July 2020 of his mother, the regent Queen Noloyiso Sandile Aah! Noloyiso, daughter of King Cyprian Bhekuzulu Nyangayezizwe kaSolomon and sister to the Zulu monarch King Goodwill Zwelithini kaBhekuzulu. She was married to King Maxhob'ayakhawuleza Sandile Aah! Zanesizwe, who died in July 2011. The Rharhabe kingdom consists of 40 Traditional Councils, stretching out from King Williamstown, Peddie, Whittlesea and the Great Fish River areas, including Alice.

== See also ==
- List of Xhosa Chiefs
- List of Xhosa Kings
- List of Xhosa people
- Xhosa clan names
- Xhosa language
- Xhosa people
- Xhosa Wars
- List of rulers of the Gcaleka
- List of rulers of the Rharhabe
- Kaffraria
- Gcaleka
- Sandile (surname)
- Sebe (surname)
- Sigcawu
