= Umxhentso =

Traditional dance of the Xhosa people

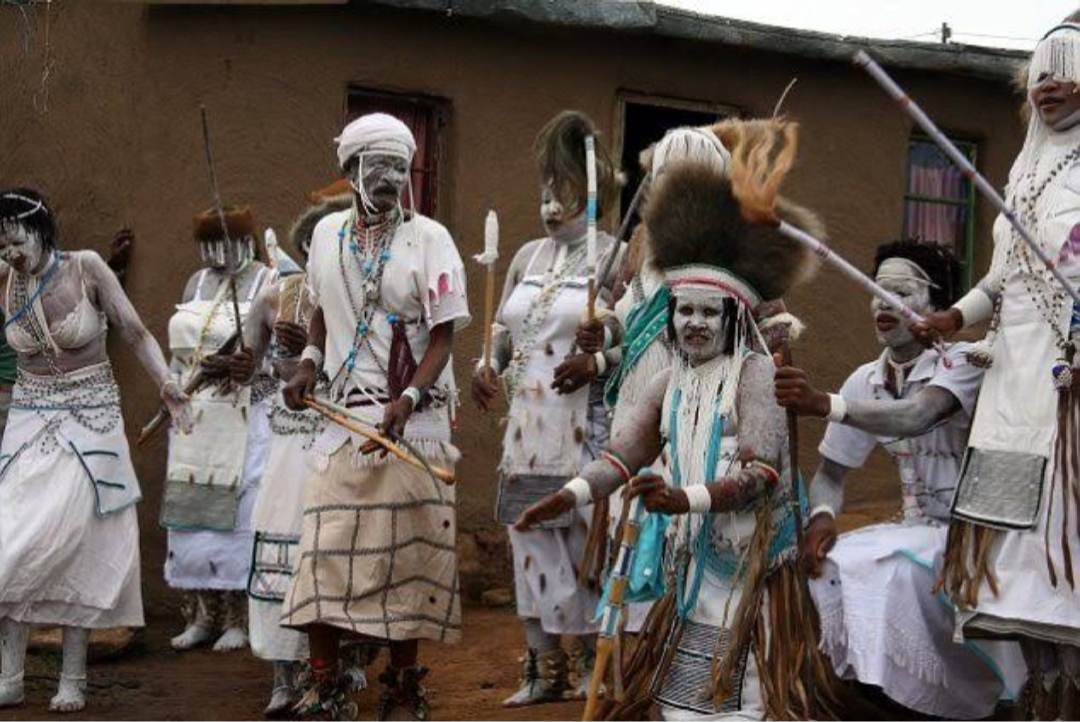
Umxhentso is the dance for joy or celebration (Xhosa traditional women healers.)

Umxhentso is the traditional dancing of Xhosa people performed mostly by Amagqirha, the traditional healers/Sangoma. Ukuxhentsa-Dancing has always been a source of pride to the Xhosas as they use this type of dancing in their ceremonies.

This dancing includes overt shoulder movements that include shaking the thoracic (this is called ukutyityimba) and the rest of the upper body, stomping barefoot. Umxhentso is usually accompanied by a drum beat or slow vocal music called ukombela with clapping to give the dancers a rhythm to follow.

== Characteristics ==
Xhosa people wear beaded clothes when they perform umxhentso. The name of these traditional garments is umbhaco, while their cousins, the Zulus, wear animal hide (men) and colourful clothing and beads (women). They usually paint themselves prior to performing. Umxhentso is mostly performed in the Transkei homeland in the Eastern Cape Province of South Africa where the tradition is still valued.

Musical accompaniment includes :

- Uhadi musical bow
- Drum Beat
- Composition and singing of theme songs called ukombela
- A whistle-Impempe made out of Ingcongolo reed

== Categories ==
The different types of Umxhentso are:

=== Umngqungqo ===
An ancient dance performed by old women. It is performed in ritual ceremonies. It requires little movement and is considered to be highly dignified. It is slow and accompanied by low-pitched music and clapping. The umgqungqo is performed on wedding ceremonies, when a young girl is matured normally after puberty or in her teens Xhosa people used to have arranged marriages called 'ukuthwalwa' then on wedding ceremony called 'umendiso' theme songs are sung.

=== Umdudo ===
This is a dance that is performed in weddings. The word Umdudo is derived from the verb ukudada which means to swim. The choreography of this dance includes spinning up and down. This type of dancing is often accompanied by ‘umbholorho’, songs performed at weddings (Umtshato).

=== Intlombe ===
Intlombe is performed by traditional healers/Amagqira during their initiation ceremonies. The term Ukuxhentsa (verb) represents a dance performed by young girls during festivals and traditional ceremonies.

=== Umguyo ===
This is a rite passage celebration by boys who are going to initiation school for transition from boyhood to manhood through *Ulwaluko.

== See also ==
- Ukuthwalwa
- Ulwaluko
- Intonjane
