= Andile Ncobo =

South African football referee

Andile Aldrin "Ace" Ncobo (born 1967 in Nqadu Village, Willowvale, Eastern Cape) is a former South African football (soccer) referee. He was a school principal (Dumalisile Comprehensive High School, Butterworth High School) and university lecturer. He resigned from education in 2007 when he took up a position as general manager for the Premier Soccer League.

Ncobo was formerly a FIFA referee, and is known to have officiated in FIFA matches during the period from 2000 to 2007. He served as a referee in the 2010 World Cup qualifiers.
