= Hintsa kaKhawuta =

King of the Xhosa people (1780–1835)

IKumkani uHintsa
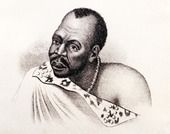
- Sketch of King Hintsa ka Khawuta from the 1800s
- Born: c. 1780
- Died: 12 May 1835 (aged 54–55)

King Hintsa ka-Khawuta (c. 1780–12 May 1835), also known as King Hintsa Zanzolo, was the king of the Xhosa Kingdom, founded by his ancestor, King Tshawe. He ruled from 1820 until his death in 1835. The kingdom at its peak, during his reign stretched from the Mbhashe River, south of Mthatha, to the Gamtoos River (Xelexwa in isiXhosa), North East of the Garden Route.

== Early life ==
=== Lineage and family ===
Hintsa was the son of Khawuta ka Gcaleka. His father was the eldest son of Gcaleka ka Phalo. His mother Nobutho is said to be a daughter of Tshatshu whose father was Xhosa and grandfather was Thukwa of Thembuland. The name of King Hintsa's capital in Gcuwa (Butterworth) in the Eastern Cape was named "Kulo Mali".

Hintsa is the 9th descendant of King Tshawe and is also a direct descendant of King Xhosa, the historical son of Mnguni who is known among the Ngunis as a skilled warrior but also aggressive.

Hintsa had four known sons, Sarili ka Hintsa (1810) from his first wife Nomsa kaGambushe Tshezi and Ncaphayi ka Hintsa, Manxiwa ka Hintsa and Lindinyura ka Hintsa from an unknown second wife.

== Reign ==
Hintsa became King in 1804, and he was crowned in 1820 after taking over from his uncle Nqoko ka Gcaleka who was regent king.

Hintsa is often compared to his great-ancestor, Tshawe kaNkosiyamntu.

=== Army and military ===
The Xhosa Kingdom was one of the strongest kingdoms in Africa, and had arguably the largest army in the Southern Africa. Hintsa had a regiment called the 'Inkonyane' that moved company by company, on starting, it would be in the act of moving off all day.

Some historians have argued that although the Hintsa had a large army, he may not be the greatest Xhosa king there ever was. However, Hintsa's chiefs who at times raided neighbouring kingdoms and attacked Xhosa rulers of tributary states had very powerful armies but were however no match to the Paramount Hintsa.

=== Invasions and civil war ===
During his reign, the Xhosa Kingdom was in conflict with the Cape Colony. The Xhosa nation was also under pressure from civil wars between chiefs and invasions by refugee tribes from the Mfecane.

The first invading group whom the Xhosas had to contend was what would become the 'AmaBhaca' led by Madzikane. After many vicissitudes, the Bhaca moved down into Thembuland where they attacked the Right Hand House amaTshatshu, causing them to flee to Maqoma for safety. The Xhosa, the Thembu and Mpondomise kingdoms combined forces and crushed the Bhaca, killing Madzikane (1823–25). The Bhaca entered into an uneasy alliance with the Mpondo and launched a joint attack on the Bomvana but this was repulsed by the Paramount, Hintsa.

=== Kingdom ===
Hintsa led a powerful kingdom (AmaXhosa) in Southern Africa at the time, which would eventually come into war with the British Empire and led to the latter's colonial expansion in Southern Africa.

The Xhosa Kingdom is led by two houses, the Gcaleka House (Great House or the Senior House), which is the ruling house, and the Rharhabe House (right-hand house), which is the second senior house.

== Sixth Frontier war (1834–1836) ==
The Sixth Frontier War (1834–1836) between the Xhosa and the British is sometimes known as the Hintsa War. The war broke out when a Cape government commando party patrolled land near the Kat River which was occupied by Rharhabe chiefs Maqoma, Tyali and Botumane in December 1834. These patrols increased the bitterness that Maqoma and Tyali had after they had been forcibly removed by the Cape government from the Tyume Valley in 1833. On 21 December 1834, large force of some 10 000 RharhabeXhosas led by Maqoma, and Tyali swept into the Cape Colony, devastated the country between the Winterberg and the sea. Hintsa offered moral support to the chiefs but never sent an army to assist them.

After fighting for several months, the British troops led by Sir Harry Smith and Sir Benjamin d'Urban realised that their campaign had gone on for too long and would make them unpopular with authorities in Britain. To bolster their attack, they requested Hintsa to attack the Rharhabe chiefs. In early February 1835, Hintsa offered 1000 men but as weeks went on it became clear that Hintsa was not willing to betray the Rharhabe chiefs. d'Urban used this as an excuse to declare war on Hintsa. However, Hintsa opted to talk things through with the British.

On 14 April 1835 British governor Sir Benjamin d'Urban confronted King Hintsa with a large army. d'Urban insisted that Hintsa was the leader of the entire Xhosa nation and held him responsible for initial attacks on the Cape Colony, and for taking back cattle that was initially stolen from the Xhosa's. d'Urban dictated the following terms to Hintsa: That all the country from the Cape's prior frontier, the Keiskamma River, as far as the Great Kei River would be annexed as the British "Queen Adelaide Province", and its inhabitants declared British subjects, and all the cattle initially claimed from the Xhosa's to be returned to the Cape Colony.

== Account of death ==
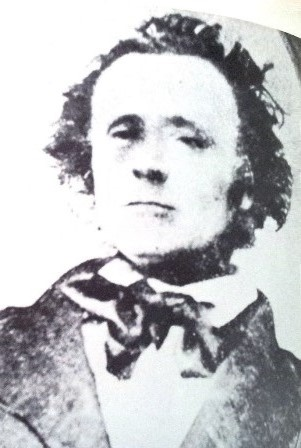
George Southey, the lieutenant chiefly known for killing Hintsa kaKhawuta and mutilating his corpse.

Hintsa waa invited to peace talks by the governor of the Cape Colony, Sir Harry Smith. Smith demanded 50,000 heads of cattle in compensation for the 1834 war and for Hintsa order his chiefs to surrender. Hintsa was then held captive until the terms were met.

Hintsa sent word to Maqoma, his military commander, warning him to prepare to defend the country.

In May 1835, Hintsa was riding as a prisoner escorted by a detachment of colonial troops led by Smith. Mostert tells the story:

"The march was resumed at midnight on the 11th. Breakfasting at daylight on 12 May, with more signal flares in the distance, Hintsa suddenly demanded: “What have the cattle done that you want them? Why must I see my subjects deprived of them?”

“That you know far better than I do,” Smith angrily replied.

Throughout this expedition Hintsa had been guarded by members of the Corps of Guides, under a lithe, tough young settler, George Southey, who became suspicious when, at the bottom of a steep hill that rose abruptly from a river, Hintsa dismounted and walked his horse. Southey told another guide, Cesar Andrews, to draw his gun because Hintsa was saving the horse's strength and obviously planned to escape. Half-way up the hill Hintsa decided to ride again instead of walk. All along he had been free to move within the column as he chose, accompanied by the Guides. Once on his horse, he spurred ahread until he came alongside Harry Smith. Someone shouted, 'Hintsa's off!' Smith drew his own pistol and shouted, 'Hintsa, stop!' The Chief had ridden into a thicket and, as he emerged back into the path, smiled at Smith, who immediately regretted his suspicions. He allowed Hintsa to continue past him, to where the Guides now were riding, at the head of the march.

When he reached the top of the hill Smith turned to look back at the column. There was another shout, 'Hintsa is off!' The Chief had suddenly urged his horse past the Guides and was galloping across open country towards a village near a river.

Harry Smith, with the sort of immediate passionate rush of energy that he seemed always able to summon at such moments, himself led the chase. For half a mile Hintsa's horse was as fast as Smith's, but he was gradually overtaken. Smith pulled out a pistol, but it snapped. He took out another, and it also snapped. He eased his horse, to allow it to recover wind, and then spurred it once more until he came alongside Hintsa, who stabbed furiously with his assegai. Smith drew his useless pistol at the Chief and then, coming so close that Hintsa had difficulty stabbing, he threw the Chief violently from his horse. 'Oh! if I could but describe the countenance of Hintsa when I seized him by the throat and he was in the act of falling,' Smith later wrote to his wife. 'A devil could not have breathed more liquid flame. I shall never forget it.'

Smith's own horse at that point was racing too wildly to round easily, but George Southey and the other Guides had caught up. “Shoot, George, and be damned to you!” Smith shouted back. Southey fired and hit Hintsa in the left leg. The Chief stumbled, but got to his feet again. Smith, galloping back, yelled, 'Be damned to you, shoot again!' Southey fired, and Hintsa pitched forward. But once more he struggled to his feet, and managed to reach thick cover along the banks of the river.

Southey and Smith's aide-de-camp, Lieutenant Paddy Balfour, went down to the river, followed by others. Southey was clambering over a rock when an assegai struck the surface close by. Turning, he saw Hintsa in the water, submerged except for his head. A Khoikhoi trooper wading through the river had also spotted the Chief, who then stood up and called out several times in Xhosa, 'Mercy.' George Southey, who spoke Xhosa fluently, took aim and fired, shattering Hintsa's head and scattering his brains and skull fragments over the bank.

Southey was first beside the body and quickly took Hintsa's brass ornaments for himself. As the others gathered around, they grabbed for what was left of Hintsa's beads and bracelets. George Southey or his brother WIlliam cut off one of Hintsa's ears and someone else took the other ear. Assistant Surgeon Ford of the 72nd Highlanders was seen trying to extract some of the Chief's teeth. 'This was a very wrong and barborous thing to do, but we did not think so at the time,' Henry James Halse, one of the settler provisionals later wrote. Another provisional, Captain William Gilfillan, did not wait for the far future to regard it all as bestial. That night he expressed in his diary his regret that some had allowed 'their insatiable thirst of possessing a relic of so great a man to get the better of their humanity and better feeling, which teaches us not to trample on a fallen foe'.

Smith ordered the body to be brought up the hil from the river. An officer told some soldiers to wrap Hintsa's body in a kaross and bring it up on a horse. On the way up, however, a second message arrived from Smith to say he no longer wished to see the body. It was dropped from the horse, and left lying on the ground for his followers to find. 'I had no tools, or I would have buried it,' Smith later said, a statement hard to believe, especially from such a resourceful man, whose army experience taught many uses for the bayonet, and whose own store wagons were hardly likely to have been on the road without a spade or two. 'Thus terminated the career of the Chief Hintsa,' he wrote in his official report of the event, 'whose treachery, perfidy and want of faith made him unworthy of the nation of atrocious and indomitable savages over whom he was the acknowledged chieftain.' Some of Hintsa's bracelets and the assegai he had thrown at Smith were sent home to Juana as his own souvenirs of the man of whom he had held so many conflicting views."

— Noël Mostert, Frontiers: The epic of South Africa's creation and the tragedy of the Xhosa people 1st American ed (Albert A Knopf Incorporated, New York, 1992) 724–726.

== Validity of the account ==
The validity of the account of the death of Hintsa cannot be fully trusted. South African historian Premesh Lalu noted that British colonial archives convey "imagined worlds of colonial officials, settlers and missionaries [that] also figured prominently in the constructions of Hintsa and the justification of his murder". Details such as the king trying to flee, throwing his spear "harmlessy" and crying "mercy" are likely to have been added so as to diminish his status in history a bold military leader.

== Legacy ==
Hintsa is considered a hero in South Africa's and the Xhosa people's history. His wars, the Xhosa Kingdom and its subsequent demise laid the foundation of the formation of South Africa as a country. Knowledge of his legacy is transmitted through oral history by poems and stories and he is often compared to his great-ancestor, Tshawe kaNkosiyamntu.

In 1996 Nicholas Tilana Gcaleka, a descendant of Hintsa, claimed to have returned the 161-year-old skull of Hintsa from Scotland. He also claimed that he was the great-great nephew of Hintsa and was called on by the spirits of his ancestors to go to Scotland to find Hintsa's head. The Gcaleka Xhosa monarch, Xolilizwe Sigcawu, and his court refused to sanction the planned burial of the skull because they said it was not the disembodied head of Hintsa. Forensic tests subsequently proved that the skull was most likely the skull of a middle-aged European woman.

The King Hintsa Bravery Award for leaders that live and act in the spirit of Hintsa kaKhawuta was established in 1999. It was awarded to Jacob Zuma in 2012. Earlier earners of the award include Robert Mugabe, president of Zimbabwe. The award is conferred by the ruling Xhosa king.

In 2014, Centane Technical College, Teko Technical College, H.B. Tsengwa Technical College and Idutywa Satellite formerly known as Idutywa Community College merged to form the King Hintsa Tvet College in honour of King Hintsa in 2013. The college's headquarters are in Butterworth, Eastern Cape. Every May, since 2013 the college has been hosting the King Hintsa Memorial Lecture.
