= Bessie (South African queen) =

South African traditional aristocrat

Bessie (fl. 1730s - circa 1808 in Mngazana), otherwise known as Gquma, was a South African traditional aristocrat. As the Great Wife of Inkosi Sango of the Tshomane, she served as a queen of the Mpondo people.

== Life ==
A famous figure in South African history, Bessie was a white, probably English girl that was adopted by a local Tshomane clan following a shipwreck that cast her upon their shores. She was about seven years old when she was shipwrecked, and the incident occurred between 1736 and 1740.

Her adoptive family - the AbeLungu - had themselves previously acculturated into the local tribes of the Wild Coast region of South Africa after similar misfortunes had befallen them. They gave her the name Gquma ("The Roar of the Sea").

Upon coming of age, she married Tshomane, paramount chief of the Mpondo clan whose name he shared. When he died a short time later, she married his successor Sango (d. 1792). She had her son Mdepa in 1755 and her daughter Bessy in 1766.

She was ruling as Sango's consort when the English merchant vessel The Grosvenor ran aground on the shore of their territory in Lambasi Bay in 1782, about 40 years after her own ship did the same. At least one of its passengers is thought to have joined the Tshomanes, possibly through the influence of Bessie. Van Reenen's rescue expedition arrived in 1790 and encountered Bessie, along with a village they referred to as "the Bastard Village," reportedly home to children of the stranded English people.

Bessie was a popular ruler of her husband's people, weighty in counsel and deep in feeling. She died in 1808 in Mngazana. Upon her death, she was one of the few women of the tribe to receive an ancestral praise name.

== Descendants ==
Bessie left behind a large family of descendants. These descendants went on to create a far-flung dynasty that now includes everything from Mpondo, Xhosa and Thembu royalty to old Afrikaner and Coloured families.

== See also ==
- History of South Africa
- Krotoa
