= Noloyiso Sandile =

South African royal (1963–2020)

- Aah! Noloyiso

Royal House of the AmaRharhabe
- Predecessor: Maxhob'ayakhawuleza Sandile
- Successor: Jonguxolo Sandile
- Born: Nomusa Jeanette kaBhekuzulu; July 24, 1963; Nongoma
- Died: 8 July 2020 (aged 56); Mdantsane, Eastern Cape
- Burial: Mngqesha, Qonce
- Spouse: Maxhob'ayakhawuleza Sandile
- Issue: Princess NomaRharhabe Sandile, King Jonguxolo Sandile
- House: Zulu (by birth); AmaRharhabe (by marriage)
- Father: Cyprian Bhekuzulu kaSolomon
- Mother: Mavis Zungu
- Occupation: Consort

Queen (iKumkanikazi) Noloyiso Sandile (born: Nomusa kaBhekuzulu; 24 July 1963 – 8 July 2020) was a South African Royal.

== Biography ==
=== Early life ===
Princess Nomusa kaBhekuzulu was the daughter of the then Zulu King Cyprian Bhekuzulu kaSolomon and one of his wives, Mavis Zungu, popularly known as Ndlunkulu Gwabini. Her siblings among others include, King Goodwill Zwelithini kaBhekuzulu, Prince Mbonisi, and Princess Thembi kaBhekuzulu Ndlovu.

Sandile attended Star of the Sea High School and furthered her studies at KwaGqikazi College of Education.

=== Marriage and Regency ===
In 1988, Sandile married the Royal House of the AmaRharhabe Monarch Maxhob'ayakhawuleza Sandile.The Sandile family and nation of AmaRharhabe honored her with the name Noloyiso, as she undertook royal duties serving as queen consort. The couple had two children, Princess NomaRharhabe (born;1990) and King Jonguxolo (born;1992).

Following the death of her husband in 2011, Sandile was appointed as Queen Regent and interim ruler of the AmaRharhabe Kingdom, a position she held until her death in 2020. Her son's ascension to the throne was announced at her funeral on 12 July 2020.

=== Death ===
Sandile died in Mdantsane on 8 July 2020 due to COVID-19 related complications during the COVID-19 pandemic in South Africa. The spokesperson of AmaRharhabe, Prince Zolile Burns-Ncamashe issued a statement confirming ukukhothama of the Queen.

Regnal titles
| Preceded by Maxhob'ayakhawuleza Sandile | King of the Xhosa (Rharhabe) Kingdom (as Regent); 2011–2020 | Succeeded by Jonguxolo Sandile |
