= Maxhob'ayakhawuleza Sandile =

- Xhosa royal
- Reign: 1991 – 11 July 2011
- Coronation: 1995
- Predecessor: Mxolisi Bazindlovu Sandile
- Successor: Jonguxolo Sandile
- Born: 21 May 1956; Union of South Africa
- Died: 11 July 2011 (aged 55)
- Consort: Nomusa Zulu
- Issue: King Jonguxolo Sandile; Princess NomaRharhabe Sandile
Names
- Maxhob'ayakhawuleza Zanesizwe kaBazindlovu ka Velile Sandile
- House: House Of Phalo
- Father: Mxolisi Bazindlovu Sandile

King (iKumkani) Maxhob'ayakhawuleza Sandile "Aa! Zanesizwe!" (21 May 1956 – 11 July 2011) was the son of the late King Mxolisi Sandile "Aa! Bazindlovu", who was the son of King Archie Velile Sandile, and Queen Nolizwe, (the daughter of Western Mpondoland King Victor Poto Ndamase "Aa! Bhekuzulu!", and sister to King Tutor Vulindlela Ndamase "Aa! Nyangelizwe!"; Xhosa Queen Nondwe Sigcawu the wife of King Xolilizwe Sigcawu "Aa! Xolilizwe!"; and AmaBhele Chieftain Nolusapho Mabandla the wife of Chief Thandathu Jongilizwe Mabandla "Aa! Jongilizwe!" of the AmaBhele aseTyhume royal clan). He was brother to AmaMpondomise Queen Nolitha Matiwane the wife of King Loyiso Mitwane and mother to AmaMpondomise King Luzuko Matiwane, Aa! Zwelozuko!. He was the 6th descendant of Sandile and 10th descendant of King Phalo, the Son of King Tshiwo.

In 1988 he married his wife, Princess Nomusa Zulu, who was the daughter of the then Zulu King, the late King Cyprian Bhekuzulu kaSolomon and sister to King Goodwill Zwelithini kaBhekuzulu.

He became ruler of the Right Hand House of the Xhosa Kingdom in 1991 after his mother had been regent during the time when the Ciskeian government had been under the control of Lennox Sebe which was later taken over in the same period by Brigadier Joshua Oupa Gqozo.

== Death and funeral ==
He died at St. Dominic's Hospital in East London on the 11 July 2011. He was buried at Mngqesha Great Place in King William's Town on the 23 July 2011, he was given state funeral together with royal funeral and Xhosa King Zwelonke Sigcawu presided at the funeral, his funeral was attended by Prince Mangosuthu Buthelezi, General Bantu Holomisa, ANC Chairperson of the Eastern Cape Phumulo Masualle, government representatives Premier of the Eastern Cape Noxolo Kiviet, Minister of Rural Development and Land Reform Gugile Nkwinti and royal houses of the Zulu royal house, Western amaMpondo, Western abaThembu, amaNdebele and others and other distinguished guests, President Jacob Zuma never attended but sent his condolences to the family and eulogy was made on his behalf by the ANC parliamentary chief whip Mathole Motshekga.

Regnal titles
Preceded by Mxolisi Bazindlovu Sandile	King of the Xhosa (Rharhabe) Kingdom; 1991–2011	Succeeded by Noloyiso Sandile (as Regent); Jonguxolo Sandile (as King)
