= Ngqushwa Local Municipality =

Ngqushwa
- Local municipality
- Seal

- Location in the Eastern Cape
- Coordinates: 33°12′S 27°07′E
- Country: South Africa
- Province: Eastern Cape
- District: Amathole
- Seat: Peddie
- Wards: 11

Government
  - Type: Municipal council
  - Mayor: (ANC)

Area
  - Total: 2,241 km^{2} (865 sq mi)

Population (2011)
  - Total: 72,190
  - Density: 32.21/km^{2} (83.43/sq mi)

Racial makeup (2011)
  - Black African: 99.2%
  - Coloured: 0.2%
  - Indian/Asian: 0.1%
  - White: 0.4%

First languages (2011)
  - Xhosa: 94.7%
  - English: 2.6%
  - Other: 2.7%
- Time zone: UTC+2 (SAST)
- Municipal code: EC126

Ngqushwa Municipality (Xhosa: uMasipala wase Ngqushwa) is a local municipality within the Amatole District Municipality, in the Eastern Cape province of South Africa.

== Main places ==
The 2001 census divided the municipality into the following main places:

Place	Code	Area (km^{2})	Population
Amahlubi	21501	25.88	1,095
Amambalu	21502	64.29	144
Bhele	21503	71.60	5,626
Dabi	21504	9.96	1,010
Glenmore	21505	13.18	1,373
Hamburg	21506	3.30	193
Imidushane	21507	345.41	15,216
Imiqayi	21508	176.73	14,947
Mareledwana	21509	243.17	10,774
Mhala	21510	101.29	5,355
Mphekweni	21511	0.28	27
Msuthu	21512	70.89	4,515
Ngqushwa	21513	158.71	233
Njokweni	21514	86.22	4,667
Peddie Part 1	21515	653.47	10,791
Peddie Part 2	21517	9.77	3,696
Tyefu	21516	211.15	4,583

== Politics ==
The municipal council consists of twenty-one members elected by mixed-member proportional representation. Eleven councillors are elected by first-past-the-post voting in eleven wards, while the remaining ten are chosen from party lists so that the total number of party representatives is proportional to the number of votes received.

In the election of 4 November 2026 the African National Congress (ANC) won a majority of fifteen seats.

The following table shows the results of the election.

Party	Ward			List			Total seats
Party	Votes	%	Seats	Votes	%	Seats	Total seats
African National Congress	12,934	67.90	11	13,323	70.45	4	15
South African Communist Party	1,875	9.84	0	2,253	11.91	2	2
Economic Freedom Fighters	1,109	5.82	0	1,201	6.35	1	1
Democratic Alliance	585	3.07	0	635	3.36	1	1
Independent candidates	1,057	5.55	0				0
Pan Africanist Congress of Azania	444	2.33	0	477	2.52	1	1
Afrika Mayibuye Movement	327	1.72	0	320	1.69	1	1
5 other parties	717	3.76	0	703	3.72	0	0
Total	19,048	100.00	11	18,912	100.00	10	21
Valid votes	19,048	97.57		18,912	97.23		
Invalid/blank votes	474	2.43		538	2.77		
Total votes	19,522	100.00		19,450	100.00		
Registered voters/turnout	38,001	51.37		38,001	51.18		
