= Zizi =

Zizi is a personal name or nickname which may refer to:

- Zizi Jeanmaire (1924–2020), French ballet dancer
- Zizi Lambrino (1898–1953), the first wife of King Carol II of Romania
- Zizi Possi, Brazilian singer
- Zizi Roberts (born 1979), Liberian football player
- Zheng Zhi, Chinese footballer
- Zizi Adel, Egyptian singer
- Farid Zizi, French Civil Servant

== See also ==
- Zizzi
- Zizians
