= AbeLungu peoples (Xhosa clans) =

Multiracial Xhosa ethnic groups

The AbeLungu peoples are a series of Xhosa sub-ethnic groups in South Africa that have multiracial ancestry. Their name translates to The White People due to the fact that their founding ancestors were Caucasian, East Asian or South Asian men, women and children that were cast upon the coast of the Transkei over the course of 300 to 400 years, and they and other members of these groups were subsequently absorbed by the Xhosa clans that were native to the region and allowed to establish their own chiefdoms over time.

The abeLungu clan of the Xhora River in particular featured prominently in many Eastern Cape clan histories as the adoptive clan of the white Mpondo queen Gquma, who was married to the Tshomane monarch Sango. She too had been cast ashore as a child prior to her adoption, and her subsequent life as an AbeLungu meant that she survived until her marriage many years later and her bloodline was therefore prevented from dying out by way of it.
