= Sihota =

- Location within Eastern Cape Location within South Africa
- Coordinates: 32.511°S 27.979°E
- Country: South Africa
- Province: Eastern Cape
- District: Amathole
- Municipality: Great Kei
- Time zone: UTC+2 (SAST)

Sihota is a settlement some 10 km north-east of Komga and 26 km south-west of Butterworth, at the former Transkei border. Of Xhosa origin, the name is said to mean 'secluded place'named after SIHOTA a local Headman (Induna) of AmaKwai Clan son of Nciba ka Gando who was said to had been secluded from Xhosa Kingdom.
