= Sandile (surname) =

Sandile is a South African surname that may refer to

- Sandile kaNgqika (1820–1878), South African King
  - Sandile Decoration in Ciskei, South Africa
  - Sandile Medal in Ciskei, South Africa
- Emma Sandile (1842–1892), South African landowner, daughter of Sandile
- Maxhob'ayakhawuleza Sandile (1956–2011), South African royalty, descendant of Sandile
  - Sandile Dam in South Africa, named after Maxhob'ayakhawuleza
- Noloyiso Sandile (1963–2020), South African royal
- Jonguxolo Sandile (born 1992), South African royalty, descendant of Sandile
