= Daliza Sigcawu =

Daliza Sigcawu was the regent and 8th king of the Gcaleka sub-group of the Xhosa nation from 1921 to 1923. He came to power after his brother Salukaphathwa Gwebi'nkumbi Sigcawu died and until he handed over the reign to his nephew Mpisekhaya Ngangomhlaba Sigcawu in 1923. His father was Sigcawu ka Sarili.
