= Ahlangene Sigcawu =

South African king

Ahlangene Cyprian Vulikhaya Sigcawu

Xhosa Kings (Gcaleka & Rharhabe)
- Reign: 7 October 2020 –
- Coronation: TBC
- Predecessor: Zwelonke Sigcawu
- Born: 28 August 1970 (age 56); Willowvale, Cape Province, South Africa
Names
- Ahlangene Cyprian Vulikhaya Sigcawu
- House: House of Phalo
- Father: Xolilizwe Mzikayise Sigcawu
- Mother: Nogaweni Sigcawu

King Vulikhaya ka-Xolilizwe (Ahlangene Cyprian Sigcawu) is the King of Xhosa people. He was born in 1970 in Nqadu Great Place in Willowvale by King Xolilizwe Sigcawu and Queen Nogaweni. He took over as the King in 2020 after the death of caretaker Xhosa King INkosi Nongudle Dumehleli Mapasa who took over following the death of his brother King Zwelonke Sigcawu in 2019. He was a South African High Commissioner to Malawi before he could ascend the throne as the Xhosa King.

== Life ==
King Ahlangene Cyprian Vulikhaya Sigcawu "Aa! Vulikhaya!" ascended the throne of Xhosa Kingdom in 2020 after a year of his brother's death King Zwelonke Sigcawu in 2019.

Regnal titles
Preceded by Zwelonke Sigcawu (as King); Dumehleli Nongudle Mapasa (as Regent)	King of the Xhosa Kingdom; 2020–	Succeeded by Incumbent
