= Peddie, South Africa =

Peddie iNgqushwa
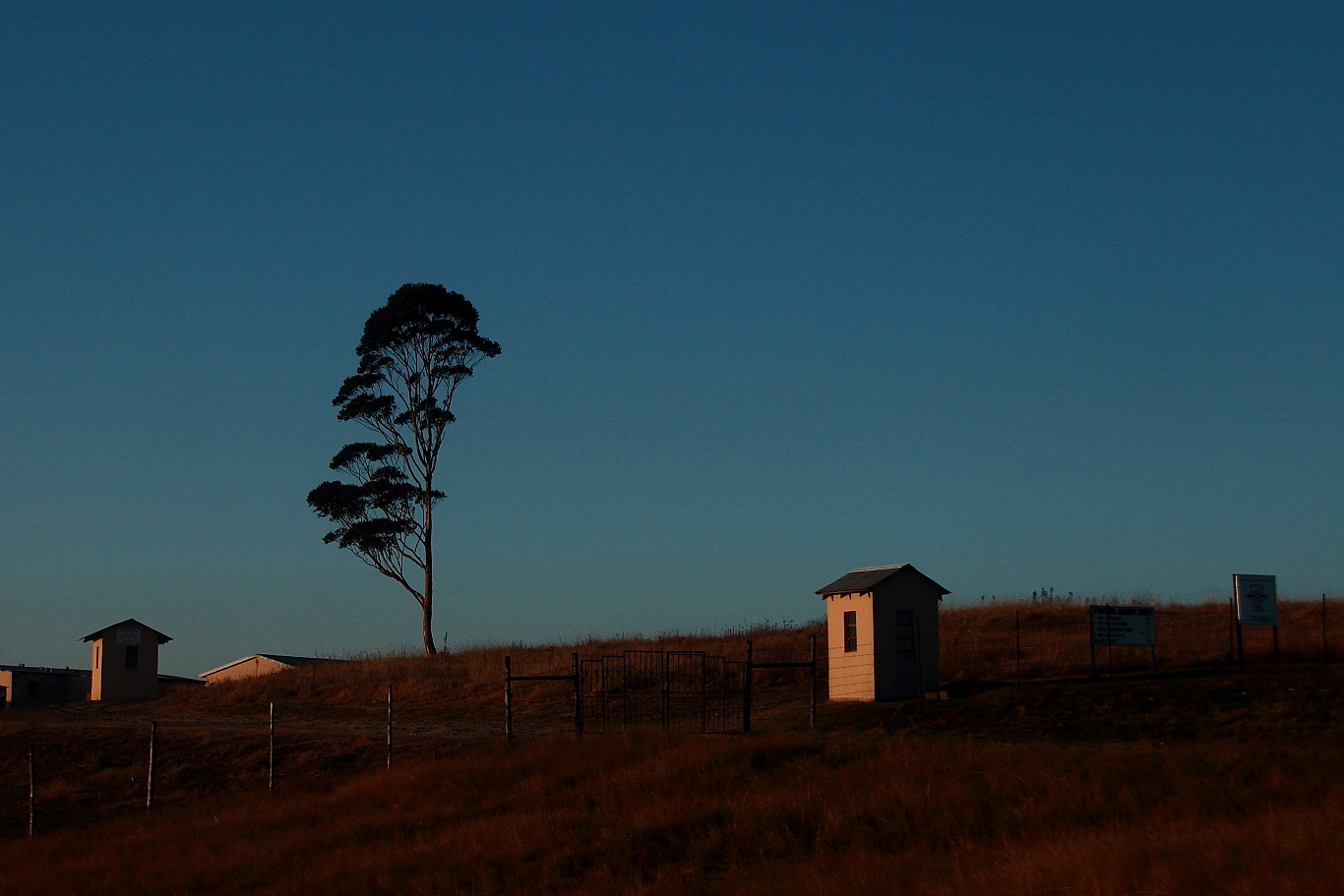

- Location within Eastern Cape Location within South Africa Location within Africa
- Coordinates: 33.196°S 27.116°E
- Country: South Africa
- Province: Eastern Cape
- District: Amathole
- Municipality: Ngqushwa

Area
  - Total: 37.32 km^{2} (14.41 sq mi)

Population (2011)
  - Total: 4,658
  - Density: 124.8/km^{2} (323.3/sq mi)

Racial makeup (2011)
  - Black African: 98.2%
  - Coloured: 1.4%
  - Indian/Asian: 0.1%
  - White: 0.2%
  - Other: 0.2%

First languages (2011)
  - Xhosa: 86.4%
  - English: 7.5%
  - Afrikaans: 1.5%
  - Other: 4.6%
- Time zone: UTC+2 (SAST)
- Postal code (street): 5640
- PO box: 5640
- Area code: 040

Peddie (Xhosa: iNgqushwa) is a town in the Ngqushwa Local Municipality within the Amathole District Municipality in the Eastern Cape province of South Africa.

== History ==
The town is situated 55 km south-west of Qonce and 67 km east of Makhanda. It developed from a frontier post established in 1835 and named Fort Peddie, and became a municipality in 1905. Named after Lieutenant-Colonel John Peddie (died 1840), who led the 72nd Highlanders against the Xhosa in the Sixth Frontier War.

A large provincial hospital on the outskirts of Peddie is named Nompumelelo Hospital.

== Notable people ==
- Ringo Madlingozi, musician and politician
- Phumlani Nodikida, rugby union player
