= Jonguxolo Sandile =

South African royal

- Aah! Vul'ulwandle

Royal House of the AmaRharhabe
- Predecessor: Maxhob'ayakhawuleza Sandile
- Born: Jonguxolo Vululwandle kaZanesizwe kaBazindlovu kaVelile Sandile; 31 July 1992 (age 34); Mngqesha Great Place, Qonce
- House: House Of Phalo
- Father: Maxhob'ayakhawuleza Sandile
- Mother: Noloyiso Sandile

Kumkani (King) Jonguxolo Sandile "Aa! Vul'ulwandle!" (born 31 July 1992) is the King and ruler of the Rharhabe House of the Xhosa Kingdom.

== Life ==
He is paternal cousin to AmaMpondomise King Luzuko Matiwane and He is maternal cousin to Zulu King Misuzulu kaZwelithini.
His ascension was announced at his mother's funeral on 12 July 2020.

Regnal titles
Preceded by Maxhob'ayakhawuleza Sandile (as King); Noloyiso Sandile (as Regent)	King of the Xhosa (Rharhabe) Kingdom; 2020–	Succeeded by Incumbent
