= Ulwaluko =

Xhosa manhood initiation ritual

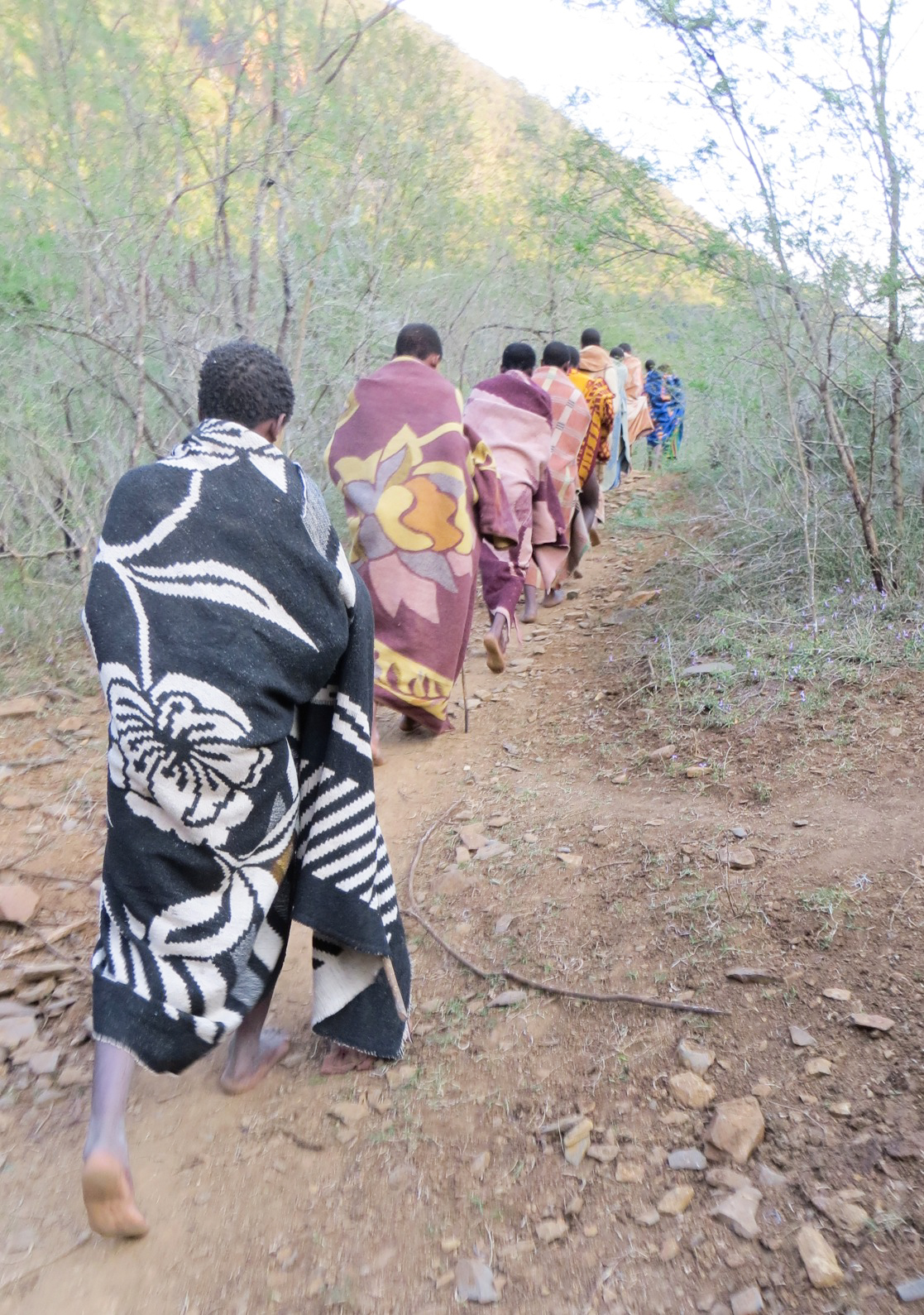
Abakhwetha (group of initiates)

Ulwaluko is a traditional initiation and rite of passage practised (though not exclusively) by the Xhosa people, and is commonly practised throughout South Africa. The ritual is traditionally intended as a teaching institution, to prepare young males for the responsibilities of manhood. Therefore, initiates are called abakhwetha in isiXhosa: aba means a group, and kwetha means initiate. A single male in the group is known as an umkhwetha. A male who has not undergone initiation is referred to as inkwenkwe (boy), regardless of his age, and is not allowed to take part in male activities such as tribal meetings.

The initiation ritual is commonly conducted during late June/early July or late November/ early December. During the ritual process the traditional surgeon (ingcibi) surgically removes the foreskin. After the cut is made, the period of seclusion that follows lasts about one month and is divided into two phases – but this is rarely the case in modern times and/or in urban areas, where it usually lasts at least 4 weeks. During the first 7 days the initiates are confined to a hut (bhoma) and the use of certain foods, for example meat, is restricted, but this may differ as certain homes have their own beliefs or ways of doing things. Water may also be restricted. This phase culminates in the ukojiswa rite, during which food taboos are released, marking the transition to the second phase that lasts a further two to three weeks. During these phases the initiates are looked after by the ikhankatha (traditional attendant). The termination of the period of seclusion commences when the boys are urged to race down to the river to wash themselves, yet again, depending on the location. The hut (Bhoma) and the initiates' possessions are burnt, including their clothing. This symbolizes a new outward appearance the initiates must take on. It is even customary for the initiated to dress very formally for a set period of time after the rite. Each initiate receives a new blanket and is now called "ikrwala" (singular) which means new man or amakrwala (plural - new men).

== Rites of Passage and ritual stages ==
The Xhosa people of southern Africa have a practice called Ulwaluko, meaning initiation, a rite of passage marking the transition from boy to man or girl to woman (intonjane). It marks a major change, bringing both social status and respect, and it shifts how the society sees you and addresses you. After the rite, boys are referred to as ubhuti, a sign of the respect and their new status, calling a man by his given name is considered highly taboo after they undergone an initiation.

=== Imbeleko ===
Imbeleko Is a ceremony performed shortly after a child’s birth to introduce the newborn to the ancestors and formally welcome them into the family and community.

=== Intonjane ===
Intonjane Is the traditional initiation ceremony for girls, marking their passage into womanhood.Girls undergoing intonjane experience seclusion and guidance on the roles, responsibilities, and cultural expectations of womanhood.

=== Ulwaluko ===
Ulwaluko Is the cornerstone male initiation rite, meaning "transition" or "circumcision." It marks the transformation of an inkwenkwe (boy) into an indoda (man). The broader ulwaluko process comprises distinct phases:

==== Ukungena ====
The entry, Early in the morning circumcision is performed at the kraal (homestead enclosure) by ingcibi (traditional surgeon). Elders and older men then accompany the initiate, called the umkhewtha, to the secluded ibhoma or bhoma—a traditional round hut usually situated in the forest near the mountains or any remote area, where he will spend the seclusion period far from the nearby society.

==== Seclusion in the Iboma ====
Typically lasting two to three weeks (shorter nowadays due to schooling and work commitments, though a full month is occasionally practiced), the initiate lives in isolation. During this time, he receives teachings from elders and appointed attendants called ikhankatha about cultural responsibilities, community ethics, survival skills, and the meaning of manhood within Xhosa society. The initiate sheds his former clothes and dons special traditional attire symbolizing his new identity. In some communities, he carries a stick representing adulthood, maturity, and authority. During the ritual itself they shave their heads and washed clean a symbolic to their transition from boy to man.

==== Ukosiswa ====
This is the first week in the ibhoma. During this time, initiates are required to eat only dry maize and drink water mixed with ash. Most other comforts are cut off, food is limited to these two things, and movement is restricted to inside the ibhoma only, they can't leave or wander around. This practice has largely been reduced due to modern intervention from the Department of Health (DoH) in South Africa. Now, ukosiswa usually lasts about three days or less, and in some communities this once-common practice doesn't happen at all, with initiates eating the same food they ate at home. After this period, they can move freely around the forest and hills, as long as they don't reveal themselves to the community or to women, since that's considered extremely shameful to the family.

==== Ukuphuma ====
("Emergence" or "Homecoming"): Upon completing the seclusion period, the initiate exits the ibhoma and runs to the nearest river to bathe, cleansing himself physically and spiritually, symbolizing rebirth and full acceptance as a man by the community, in some instances the elder males chase him as he runs to the river as a form of encouragement. He returns from the forest covered with a blanket (irhagi) that usually hides the face and head to the feet. Some carry sticks in which stick out of the small opening near the face.

==== Umgidi ====
A vital celebration held on the initiate’s return home after ukuphuma. The family and wider community slaughter a sheep or cow in his honour, showering gifts (ukusoka) and recognizing the newly initiated men (amakrwala, plural of ikrwala). This communal feast emphasizes a joyous acceptance and the new social status, and belonging. Although it has its cultural importance, it's important to note umgidi is not necessary part of the ritual, only the entry (ukungena) is considered the initiation, to some umgidi can be a financial issue.

==== Ukusoka ====
The post-initiation ritual that often follows umgidi, involving symbolic gift-giving and public affirmation of the initiate’s status as a man. This phase includes wearing distinct traditional garments and participation in social functions that reinforce the transition.

==== Burning of the Iboma ====
On the day of umgidi or shortly thereafter, the ibhoma and initiation paraphernalia—including the initiate’s old clothes discarded during seclusion—are ceremonially burnt. This ritual seals the initiate’s metamorphosis and spiritually closes the seclusion chapter.

The term umphumo sometimes refers to the homecoming ceremony synonymous with ukuphuma and umgidi, marking the initiate’s reintegration into the community as a recognized man.

Clan names, or ISIDUKO , passed down orally, are fundamental to Xhosa identity and social relations. Knowing one’s isiduko is central to cultural belonging and cohesion.

=== Cultural Significance and Controversy ===
Ulwaluko remains a profoundly sacred and secretive rite, reserved exclusively for initiates and elder men. Media or public discussion of the rituals is often sensitive and can provoke backlash from communities.

The practice of ulwaluko includes traditional body adornment such as clay body paint (umhlonyane or white ochre) and concludes with the burning of the ibhoma, symbolizing purification and rebirth.

These rites embody the transfer of personal identity, responsibilities, and communal duties from elders to younger generations.

Western criticisms often overlook the cultural context and the evolving safeguards embraced by Xhosa communities, many of whom strongly defend these traditions as essential to cultural preservation.

=== Additional Related Customs ===
Imikhwetha are often accompanied by community-wide celebrations featuring traditional dances, singing, and feasts.

Post-birth rituals include imbeleko and burial of the placenta and umbilical cord near the homestead, customs elaborated in greetings such as Inkaba yakho iphi? (“Where is your navel?”), which reveals one’s origins, clan, and social status.

== Health concerns ==
At least 969 initiates have died from complications resulting from the ritual since 1995. Accurate statistics are not available for the number of penile amputations, but it is estimated that their number is roughly twice the number of deaths. Most deaths and complications are the result of incompetence on the part of traditional practitioners. This is the reason why in particular Pondoland is heavily affected by deaths and complications. The Mpondo practised the ritual until King Faku prohibited it in the 1820s after he had lost several of his sons from complications. Initiation schools re-emerged in the 1980s and 1990s, and the ritual is now being practised on a large scale.

In January 2014, Desmond Tutu urged traditional leadership and government to intervene, and "to draw on the skills of qualified medical practitioners to enhance our traditional circumcision practices." He furthermore emphasised the cultural importance of the ritual as an educational institution, preparing initiates "to contribute to building a better society for all."

Over the summer in 2019 in South Africa, a total of 21 boys died in separate initiation schools throughout the region. The majority of the deaths were attributed to dehydration due to the restriction of water. The Health Minister, Zweli Mkhize, recommended that the schools no longer practice the ritual in summer months.

Andre van der Merwe’s surgery on a 21-year-old man who fell victim of complications due to initiation rituals at illegitimate initiation schools. On 21 April 2017 a second penis transplant was performed by the same team of doctors led by Dr. van der Merwe on a 40-year-old man who lost his penis 17 years prior to the procedure. Doctors have said that due to the circumstances surrounding illegal circumcision schools, South Africa has become one of the countries with the greatest need for penis transplantation.

=== Safety Interventions ===
Deaths during traditional initiation circumcision ceremonies in South Africa have been documented regularly, with boys dying each season at illegal schools. The practice has also been linked to HIV transmission risk through the sharing of unsterilised instruments among initiates.

Now the legal age verification is mandatory prior to initiation, commonly setting the minimum age at 16 or 18 years, and parental or guardian consent is required for minors. Medical examinations before circumcision ensure initiates are healthy enough for the procedure, while traditional surgeons (ingcibi) and initiation schools must be registered and subject to oversight enforcing safety protocols. Initiates are required to drink water regularly during seclusion, a measure introduced to prevent dangerous dehydration that was previously practiced culturally in some circles, and the use of sterile cutting instruments is promoted aggressively to avert transmission of HIV/AIDS, tetanus, and other infections.

The Customary Initiation Act (2021) legislates cultural rites while ensuring health standards and human rights protections are met. This act legally mandates compliance with specified initiation regulations.

== Homosexuality ==
Homosexual men in South Africa are still vilified and criticised by their communities. The ritual practise of Ulwaluko is a highly respected and sacred cultural practice among the Xhosa and some Nguni speaking peoples of South Africa. It has been alleged that the impact of the practice may threaten the self-esteem of a homosexual young man, although it is not compulsory for any person to participate. Some homosexual men who partook in this ritual reported doing so in order to receive personal validation of cultural manhood. The same can be said of heterosexual uncircumcised men. Other reasons for partaking in Ulwaluko include fulfilling the desire to meet societal expectations as well as pressure from family to ‘convert’ to heterosexuality through the process of Ulwaluko. The film The Wound premiered at the 2017 Sundance Film Festival and is inspired by Thando Mgqolozana's novel A Man Who is Not a Man. which focuses on the experiences of homosexual men during ‘Ulwaluko’. Xhosa traditional leaders criticized the film as being "disrespectful" and "undermining Xhosa culture" as it showcased hidden traditions. The film has been compared to the Oscar winning Moonlight. The practice of Ulwaluko is furthermore governed by several pieces of legislation to promote the safety and protection of underage initiates who have fallen victim to unhygienic practices at illegal initiation schools; these laws include the South African Constitution (1996), the Children's Act (2005), the (Eastern Cape) Application of Health Standards in Traditional Circumcision Act (2001), and the Traditional Health Practitioners’ Act (2004).

== Modern day perceptions ==
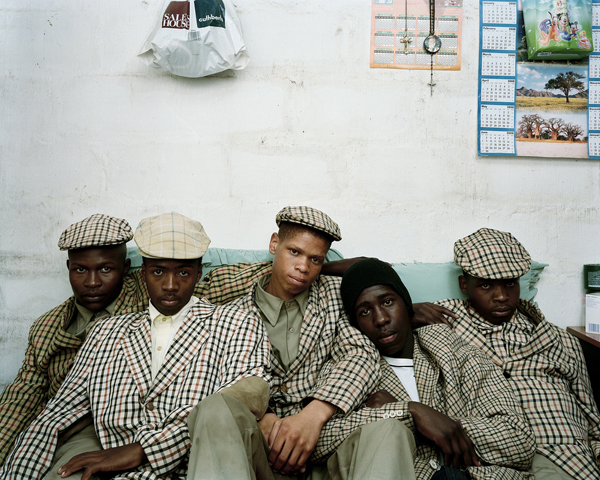
Xhosa initiates after circumcision ritual

The ancient ritual of Ulwaluko is still perceived as relevant by young Xhosa men, and Xhosa people. [Mdedetyana, 2019] It is a sacred family-oriented practice. Many are emotionally attached and find cultural significance in the ritual. Male circumcision is accessible in the hospital/clinical setting however, this option has not replaced Ulwaluko as it does not equate to the cultural meaning of Ulwaluko beyond the removal of the foreskin.(Mdedetyana, 2019) Several ceremonies take place before the young person 'enters' in which the family gathers to seek blessings and see the boy off. The young boys are reintroduced to their ancestors and 'uQamata', they are taught about their history, are taught discipline, to be family men and how to be responsible young people who contribute positively to society. There is absolutely (or should not be) no sex in the bush, hetero or otherwise, as it is considered a holy place safe for children (like Sunday school). Women and young women are not allowed, although in some families even young children may be allowed visitation as young children are venerated and represent purity and innocence. Therefore, the sexual identity of the initiate himself is less of a consideration, if at all, as he is himself still a boy child, therefore his innocence is not severed at the incision but marks (inxeba) a bittersweet transition from boy to man. He is not 'made' a man in the 'bush'.

== Controversies ==
Details of the ritual are not supposed to be disclosed to females or non-initiated males, according to the principle of 'what happens on the mountain, stays on the mountain', according to some sources. Cultural prejudice may be so great that uncircumcised or 'improperly' circumcised men are attacked and beaten for their lack of conformity, it is not clear conformity to what or the link to the short term practice itself. In March 2014 a young man was assaulted after he had spoken out during a community meeting about the complications he sustained through the ritual.

While working in South Africa, Dutch medical doctor Dingeman J. Rijken treated many patients with medical complications from Ulwaluko. In January 2014 he set up a website to "inform prospective initiates and the broader community about the dark secrets of the ritual." The website includes detailed information about the medical problems accompanying the ritual and offers possible solutions to mitigate these risks. It also features a gallery of over 150 photographs of penises injured through botched ritual circumcisions, with complications including infection, gangrene, and autoamputation. The photos, taken by Dr. Rijken and other medical providers, were published with patient consent. The publication of these photographs sparked outrage among many traditional leaders in the Eastern Cape. They demanded that the South African Film and Publication Board (FSB) shut down the website, even though the FSB was not the responsible authority. The Board however ruled that the website was "scientific with great educative value," addressing a "societal problem needing urgent intervention."

== Parallels in Other Cultures ==
Like Ulwaluko, circumcision is practised in many cultures worldwide as a rite of passage or religious ritual. In the Abrahamic religions—which include Judaism, Islam, and the Druze faith—circumcision holds significant cultural and religious significance. Jewish communities perform brit milah on the eighth day after birth, symbolising the covenant between God and Abraham. In Islam, circumcision is usually carried out during childhood as a demonstration of faith and cleanliness.

Among the Druze people, circumcision is practised as a cultural tradition rather than a strict religious obligation. The Lemba tribe of South Africa and Zimbabwe, who claim descent from ancient Jewish communities and are sometimes referred to as a “lost tribe of Israel,” also practise circumcision as part of their religious identity. Additionally, various East African groups such as the Maasai of Kenya and Tanzania use circumcision to mark the transition from boyhood to manhood paralleling aspects of Ulwaluko.

== See also ==
- Lebollo la banna
- Intonjane
