= Bhele =

Bhele AmaBhele
Total population
- 980,950

Regions with significant populations
- Eastern Cape and KwaZulu-Natal (South Africa)

Languages
- Xhosa, Swazi, Zulu, Hlubi, Sotho and English

Religion
- Christianity, African Traditional Religion

Related ethnic groups
- Nguni, Hlubi, Zulu, Basotho, Xhosa, Swazi and Matabele

The Bhele people
- Person: iBhele
- People: AmaBhele
- Language: IsiXhosa
- Country: KwaBhele

Bhele people (or AmaBhele) are an African ethnic Nguni nation. They are found in the Republic of South Africa in the KwaZulu-Natal, Eastern Cape, Free State, Mpumalanga,Western Cape and Gauteng provinces, They are said to have traceable descendants in the modern-day Kingdoms of Lesotho and Eswatini, as well as in countries like Zambia, and Zimbabwe.

The AmaBhele are said to have originated 20 km south of modern-day Ladysmith, KwaZulu-Natal in a place called Lenge, next to a mountain where their common ancestor Bhele is said to have resided about two and half centuries ago.

The AmaBhele were scattered in different directions of Southern Africa during the chaos of the Mfecane wars, many people were forced to migrate to safer areas of Southern Africa. During the Mfecane wars the scattered tribes often tried to dominate those in new territories and left a trail of destruction, leading to widespread wave of warfare; consolidation of other groups, such as the Matabele, the Mfengu and the Makololo; and the creation of states such as the modern Lesotho.
