= Willowvale, South Africa =

Willowvale Gatyana
- Location within Eastern Cape Location within South Africa Location within Africa
- Coordinates: 32.266°S 28.516°E
- Country: South Africa
- Province: Eastern Cape
- District: Amathole
- Municipality: Mbhashe

Area
  - Total: 12.30 km^{2} (4.75 sq mi)

Population (2011)
  - Total: 2,522
  - Density: 205.0/km^{2} (531.1/sq mi)

Racial makeup (2011)
  - Black African: 97.7%
  - Coloured: 0.6%
  - Indian/Asian: 0.7%
  - White: 0.4%
  - Other: 0.6%

First languages (2011)
  - Xhosa: 92.6%
  - English: 2.2%
  - Sign language: 1.1%
  - Other: 4.1%
- Time zone: UTC+2 (SAST)
- PO box: 5040
- Area code: 047

Willowvale is a town in Amathole District Municipality in the Eastern Cape province of South Africa, 32 km southeast of Idutywa. It was established as a military post in 1879 and so named because of its situation on a stream with willow trees on its banks.

== Notable people ==
- Chief Derrick Mgwebi "Aa! Daliwonga!", the Chief and elder in Xhosa Kingdom; and former South African military commander and Lieutenant General
- Ace Ncobo, former South African football (soccer) referee.
- King Ahlangene Sigcawu "Aa! Vulikhaya!", the King of the Xhosa Kingdom.
- King Bungeni Zwelidumile Sigcawu "Aa! Zwelidumile!", the King of the Xhosa Kingdom.
- King Xolilizwe Mzikayise Sigcawu "Aa! Xolilizwe!", the King of the Xhosa Kingdom.
- King Zwelonke Sigcawu "Aa! Zwelonke!", the King of the Xhosa kingdom.
