= Xolilizwe Sigcawu =

King of the Xhosa Nation

King Xolilizwe Sigcawu

King of AmaXhosa Nation
- Reign: 10 April 1965 – 31 December 2005
- Coronation: 1965
- Predecessor: King Bungeni Zwelidumile Sigcawu
- Successor: King Zwelonke Sigcawu
- Born: 6 June 1926; Willowvale, Eastern Cape
- Died: 31 December 2005 (aged 79); Pretoria, Gauteng
Names
- King Xolilizwe Mzikayise Sigcawu
- House: House of Phalo
- Father: King Bungeni Zwelidumile Sigcawu

King Xolilizwe Ka-Zwelidumile (Mzikayise Sigcawu; 6 June 1926 – 31 December 2005) was the King of the Xhosa people from 10 April 1965 to 31 December 2005. King Xolilizwe was an active member of the National House of Traditional Leaders of South Africa. He was the oldest son of King Bungeni Zwelidumile Sigcawu.

== Marriages and children ==
King Xolilizwe married five wives including Queen Nondwe, (the daughter of Western Mpondoland King Victor Poto Ndamase "Aa! Bhekuzulu!", and sister to King Tutor Vulindlela Ndamase "Aa! Nyangelizwe!") who produced five sons and six daughters.

1) Queen Nogaweni

Prince Ahlangene Sigcawu (1970)
Princess Bukelwa Sigcawu
Princess Thobeka Sigcawu
Princess Fila Sigcawu

2) Queen Nolusapho

Prince Phandulwazi Sigcawu

3) Queen Nozamile of Iqadi

Prince Zwelonke Sigcawu (1968)
Prince Simpiwe Sigcawu
Princess Vuyiswa Sigcawu
Princess Nontathu Sigcawu

4) Queen Nolitha of Ixhiba (died 1988)
5) Queen Nondwe (née Princess Seziwe Ndamase married July 1979)

Prince Nondoda Sigcawu
Princess NomaGcaleka Sigcawu

== Death and funeral ==
King Xolilizwe died on the 31 December 2005 at No 1 Military Hospital in Pretoria and was buried on the 14 January 2006 at the Nqadu Great Palace near Willowvale, Eastern Cape with state funeral and royal funeral and his funeral was attended by highly profiled politicians Premier of the Eastern Cape Nosimo Balindlela, General Bantu Holomisa and others, royal houses of abaThembu, amaMpondo, amaNdebele and other royal houses and guests including President Thabo Mbeki who made eulogy of Xolilizwe and amaRharhabe King Maxhob'ayakhawuleza Sandile who presided at the funeral.

He was succeeded by Zwelonke Sigcawu, the older son of the Iqadi house (3rd Queen).

Regnal titles
Preceded by Bungeni Zwelidumile Sigcawu	King of the Xhosa Kingdom; 1965–2005	Succeeded by Zwelonke Sigcawu
