= Nqoko kaGcaleka =

Prince Nqoko kaGcaleka (c. 1769 – 1822) was a regent king of the Xhosa nation.

Nqoko kaGcaleka was the third son of Gcaleka kaPhalo and took over the throne as regent when his oldest brother Khawuta kaGcaleka died in 1804, serving until 1810 when his nephew Hintsa kaKhawuta took over.

== Death ==
Nqoko kaGcaleka died in 1822.
