= Zwelonke Sigcawu =

Former King of the Xhosa Nation

Zwelonke Mpendulo Calvin Sigcawu

Xhosa Kings (Gcaleka & Rharhabe)
- Reign: 1 January 2006 –14 November 2019
- Coronation: 15 May 2015
- Predecessor: Xolilizwe Mzikayise Sigcawu
- Successor: Ahlangene Sigcawu
- Born: 4 April 1968; Willowvale, Eastern Cape, South Africa
- Died: 14 November 2019 (aged 51)
Names
- Zwelonke Calvin Mpendulo Sigcawu
- House: House of Phalo
- Father: Xolilizwe Mzikayise Sigcawu
- Mother: Nozamile Sigcawu

King Zwelonke ka-Xolilizwe (Mpendulo Calvin Sigcawu; 4 April 1968 – 14 November 2019) was a South African royal and King of the Xhosa people. He became king on 1 January 2006. Zwelonke was born at Nqadu Great Palace in Willowvale in the Eastern Cape to Xolilizwe Mzikayise Sigcawu and Nozamile.

King Zwelonke Sigcawu had been king of the AmaXhosa since the death of his father, King Xolilizwe Sigcawu, in 2005.

== Death and funeral ==
On the evening of 11 November 2019, the king was rushed to hospital in Mthatha by ambulance. King Zwelonke died in the early hours of 14 November 2019 at the age of 51. No cause of death was provided.

He was given a state funeral on the 29 November 2019 and together with royal funeral and at Nqadu Great Place, Willowvale, his funeral was attended by high profile politicians Former President Thabo Mbeki who made keynote speech as an elder, President Cyril Ramaphosa made eulogy, Premier of the Eastern Cape Oscar Mabuyane, General Bantu Holomisa, Julius Malema and many others and the royal houses of AmaRharhabe, amaZulu, amaNdebele, abaThembu, and many others.

Regnal titles
Preceded by Xolilizwe Mzikayise Sigcawu	King of the Xhosa Kingdom; 2006–2019	Succeeded by Dumehleli Nongudle Mapasa (as Regent); Ahlangene Sigcawu (as King)
