= Intonjane =

Xhosa rite of passage

Intonjane is a Xhosa rite of passage into womanhood practiced in the Eastern Cape of South Africa. The ritual takes place after a girl has had her first period. This ritual is symbolic of a girl's sexual maturity and ability to conceive. It is through this ritual that girls are taught about socially accepted behaviours of Xhosa women, while also encouraging them not to have sex before marriage. The origin of the name intonjane is associated with the life cycle of a stick insect. At the end of its larval stage, caterpillars encase themselves in a little grass-like mat cocoon until they are ready to emerge as adults. During these months, trees have these grassy cocoons that Xhosa people refer to as ntonjane. The kind of grass that the girl sits on during the ritual, called inkxopho, bears a resemblance to the cocoons encasing of the caterpillars on the tree, hence the name intonjane. The intonjane ritual takes three to six weeks, and several events take place during that period.

== Umngeno ==
When the girl has had her first menstruation, she notifies her mother, who in turn informs her father, who then calls on a traditional gathering called ibhunga. Jewellery made from grass is placed around her neck and waist as a symbol of her coming to age. The ibhunga gathering is marked by the making of umqombothi webhunga (traditional beer). It is during this event that the girl is informed that she is going to attend the intonjane ceremony. She then wears a necklace made from a string of a live ox’s tail hair, referred to as ubulunga. The necklace is a symbol of fertility and that the girl is ready to accept marriage proposals.

It is then that the girl goes into seclusion with amakhankatha (assistants) and her aunt. This seclusion is referred to as umngeno as it is the day that the initiate goes into isolation. The first week is marked by the initiate being placed behind a curtain without any of her clothes, apart from a black doek, and inkciyo, a beaded apron covering the pubic area. Her body is painted with white ochre, representing contact with the ancestral spirits and seclusion from tribal life.

== Umngenandlini ==
After the first or second evening, a goat is slaughtered by the father or the men of the family. After slaughtering the goat, a young man is selected to roast a piece of meat called isiphika. Once the meat is roasted, a sharpened stick is used to pick it up and the meat is given to the initiate, who is not allowed to eat it using her hands. Her assistants are not allowed to eat it with their hands.

== Umtshato ==
After umngenandlini, on the fourth day or any even numbered day after the seclusion of the initiate, a ceremony that simulates a marriage ceremony is held. The reason why umtshato must be held on an even numbered day is that the even number is symbolic of two families in a marriage union.

This ritual is marked by the slaughtering of an ox, the right shoulder of the ox, called umshwamo, is placed into the chosen special hut from the girl's homestead for the night. The following day, one of amakhankatha cooks the meat and the meat is eaten using the same stick that was used when eating the goat meat from unngenandlini. This ritual is a three-day celebration where the public is witness to the girl's new role as woman.

== Ukutsiba Intaba ==
This is an event marked by the disposal of the initiate's sanitary towels or whatever she used during her period. It is after the disposal that the girl and her amakhankatha must burn the stick that they have been using to eat the meat. The initiate and her assistants look for a place to burn the stick. Then one of her assistants ties the stick to the bunch of grass they have chosen to use as tinder and burns it. After the fire, the initiate and her assistants disperse the ashes everywhere. This is symbolic of the ending of the initiate's childhood stage and the beginning of her journey into womanhood. After dispersing of the ashes, the girls run home. However, the initiate must run fast and be ahead of her assistants because if they catch up to her, she will have to stay in the hut for an extended period.

== Umngqungqo ==
Before the end of the girl's seclusion, a party is thrown for all the women in the village. This event is referred to as umngqungqo. Women are clad in bright-coloured clothing and beads during this event. In the morning after the last day of the party, the initiate goes to the river to wash the white ochre and it is replaced by the yellow one referred to as umdike. The initiate and her assistants wear new clothes upon their return from the river. It is then that celebrations continue, to mark the end of the intonjane ritual.

== See also ==
- Xhosa
