= Gwebi'nkumbi Sigcawu =

Former King of the Xhosa Nation

King Gwebinkumbi ka-Sigcawu (Salakuphathwa Sigcawu) was the king of the AmaXhosa Nation from 1902 until his death on the 30 May 1921 and his brother Daliza Sigcawu was regent for his son. His father was King Sigcawu kaSarili.

King Gwebi'nkumbi had two sons King Mpisekhaya Ngangomhlaba Sigcawu and King Bungeni Zwelidumile Sigcawu (1906).
