= Sebe (surname) =

Sebe is a South African surname. Notable people with the name include:

- Charles Sebe (died c. 1991), a leader of the Ciskei Defence Force, the military of the Bantustan of Ciskei, and its Director of State Security; younger brother of Lennox Sebe
- Lennox Sebe (1926–1994), a chief minister of the Xhosa Bantustan of Ciskei
