= Zwelidumile Sigcawu =

King Zwelidumile Ka-Gwebinkumbi (Bungeni Sigcawu; 1906 - 9 April 1965) was the King of the AmaXhosa Kingdom of South Africa from 2 June 1933 to 9 April 1965. He took over the reins when his oldest brother Mpisekhaya Ngangomhlaba Sigcawu died. He was born near Willowvale in the Cape Colony to Salukaphathwa Gwebi'nkumbi Sigcawu.

King Zwelidumile KaGwebinkumbi had two sons King Xolilizwe Mzikayise Sigcawu (1926) and Prince Xhanti Sigcawu.

King Zwelidumile KaGwebinkumbi died on the 9 April 1965 in Umtata
