= Sigcawu kaSarili =

Chief of the Gcaleka

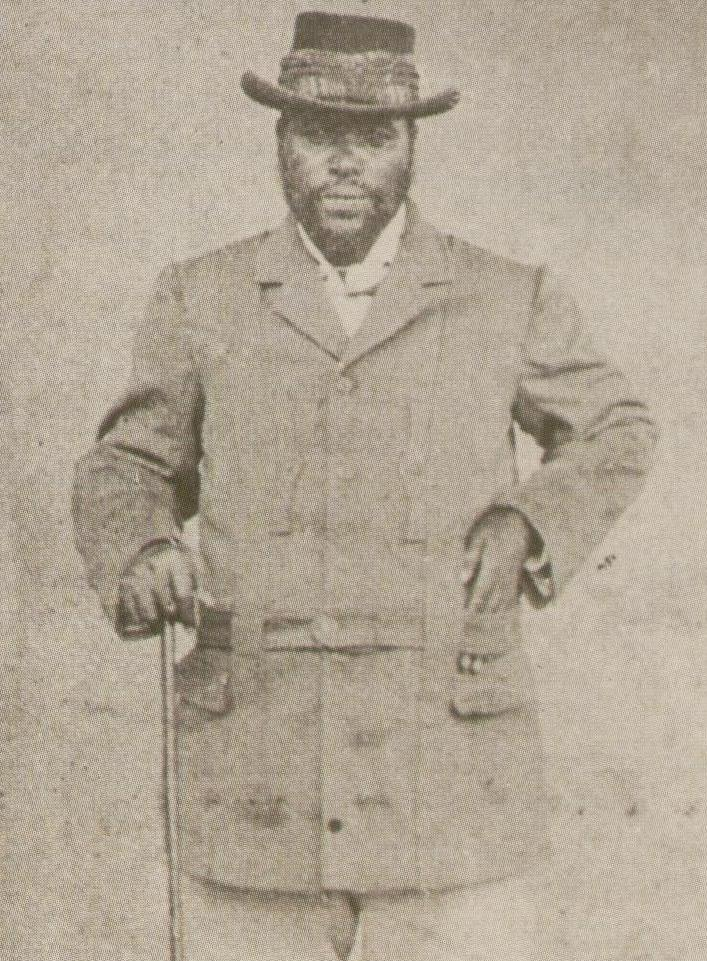
King Sigcawu ka Sarili of the Xhosa people.

Sigcawu ka-Sarhili (1892–1902) was the King of the Xhosa nation from 1892 until his death in 1902. His father was Sarili ka Hintsa and mother Queen Nobuthe.

Sigcawu had three sons Siphendu Gwebecimele, Salukaphathwa Gwebi'nkumbi Sigcawu and Daliza Sigcawu.
