= Khawuta kaGcaleka =

King Khawuta ka-Gcaleka (c. 1761–1804) was the king of the AmaXhosa Nation from 1778 To 1794. He was a direct descendant of King Phalo's Great House.

King Khawuta Ka-Gcaleka was the eldest son of King Gcaleka kaPhalo children.

King Khawuta Ka-Gcaleka had three known sons, Prince Bhurhu kaKhawuta (1785), King Hintsa kaKhawuta (1787) and Prince Malashe kaKhawuta (1793).

King Khawuta Ka-Gcaleka died in 1804 near what is now Kentani in the Eastern Cape Province. Other sources record 1794 or 1820 as the year of death.
