= Rarabe kaPhalo =

Rharhabe ka Phalo (about 1722 - 1787) was a Xhosa Prince and the founder of the Right Hand House of the Xhosa nation. Rharhabe was the eldest son and right hand son of King Phalo ka Tshiwo.

Rharhabe died near present-day Dohne in the Eastern Cape province.

== Family ==
He fathered the following known children (Mlawu ka Rharhabe (Great son), Ndlambe ka Rharhabe, Sigcawu ka Rharhabe, Cebo ka Rharhabe (Right Hand son), Hlahla ka Rahrarhabe, Nzwane ka Rharhabe, Mnyaluza ka Rharhabe, Ntsusa ka Rharhabe (a daughter) and Nukwa ka Rharhabe.

== Death ==
=== Rharhabe-Qwathi War ===
Rharhabe's daughter Ntsusa married the Qwathi chief Mdandala, who as dowry(lobola) sent a miserable hundred head of cattle to Rharhabe. This was seen by Rharhabe as a great insult for someone of his stature so he sent his Right Hand Son Cebo to Thembuland to demand more cattle. When Cebo arrived at Mdandala's homestead to demand the cattle as instructed by Rharhabe, the amaQwathi fell upon this prince and killed him.

These events enraged Rharhabe so he with his army entered Thembuland to remedy the affront at the tip of an assegai(spear). War broke out where the Rharhabe scattered the amaQwathi and seized many of their cattle. Chief Mdandala is said to have died in this battle. Although the Qwathis were defeated, Rharhabe was fatally wounded and died. This battle is estimated to have occurred around 1787.
