= Ngangomhlaba Sigcawu =

Ruler of the Gcaleka

King Ngangomhlaba ka-Gwebinkumbi (Mpisekhaya Sigcawu) was the King of the AmaXhosa nation from late 1923/1924 to June 1933 and his Bungeni Zwelidumile Sigcawu took over the throne after his death. His father was King Salukaphathwa Gwebi'nkumbi Sigcawu.

King Mpisekhaya died on 2 June 1933.
