= Gcaleka kaPhalo =

King/Monarch of AmaXhosa Nation

King Gcaleka Ka-Phalo (c. 1728 -1779) was the King of AmaXhosa Nation from 1755 to 1779. The third son of King Phalo kaTshiwo, he became King of the AmaXhosa Nation in 1755 right after his father died. King Gcaleka Ka-Phalo had 3 known sons, King Khawuta kaGcaleka (1761), Prince Velelo kaGcaleka and Prince Nqoko kaGcaleka.

King Gcaleka Ka-Phalo faced tried to usurp his father's rule and interclan war broke out resulting in the Xhosa nation to split into two major sub-groups: the Ama-Xhosa of Rarabe and Ama-Xhosa of Gcaleka. To this day the Ama-Gcaleka-Lineage is recognised as the Royal house of the Ama-Xhosa nation.King Gcaleka established his Royal House at Ngxingxolo near Moiplaas where he was innitiated to became Igqirha and ruled over his subjects including those who were residing at Moiplaas,Qumra and Kwelera.

King Gcaleka ka-Phalo he was succeeded by King Khawuta ka-Gcaleka.

Other sources state he became King in 1750 and died in 1778.
