= Phalo kaTshiwo =

Xhosa chief

King Phalo ka-Tshiwo He was the king of the Ama-Xhosa Nation from 1728 until his death in 1755.

King Phalo Ka-Tshiwo (Born:1682-Died:1755) was the second son of King Tshiwo Ka-Ngconde but his older brother Prince Gwali Ka-Tshiwo was from a junior wife and so King Phalo Ka-Tshiwo was in line for the Ama-Xhosa throne.

King Tshiwo Ka-Ngconde died the same year of King Phalo’s birth so his uncle Prince Mdange ka-Ngconde took over the reins as regent.

Prince Gwali ka-Tshiwo joined forces with Prince Ntinde Ka-Togu, chief of the Ama-Ntinde-Chieftaincy, to overthrow King Phalo Ka-Tshiwo but was not successful.

King Phalo Ka-Tshiwo he had five Known sons Prince Langa kaPhalo (1705), Prince Rarabe kaPhalo (1722), King Gcaleka kaPhalo (whose mother, Queen Thandela KaPhahlo, was the daughter of the Ama-Mpondomise monarch King Phahlo and sister to Queen Mamani kaPhahlo & also later on King Sonthlo KaPhahlo.), Prince Lutshaba kaPhalo (1730) and Prince Nukwa kaPhalo.
