= Colley Wobbles Power Station =

- Location within South Africa
- Country: South Africa
- Location: Amathole District Municipality, Eastern Cape
- Coordinates: 32°00′0.2″S 28°34′56.3″E (For the dam)
- Purpose: Power
- Status: Operational
- Construction began: 1982
- Opening date: 1984
- Owner: Eskom
- Operator: Eskom

Dam and spillways
- Impounds: Mbhashe River

Colley Wobbles Power Station
- Coordinates: 32°00′41.1″S 28°34′42.0″E
- Operator: Eskom
- Commission date: 1985
- Type: Run of the river
- Hydraulic head: 135 metres
- Turbines: Three
- Installed capacity: 42 MW (56,000 hp)
- Website; ESKOM

The Colley Wobbles Power Station is a hydroelectric power facility located approximately 30 km east of Dutywa in the Amathole District Municipality of the Eastern Cape of South Africa. Water is drawn from behind a dam on the Mbhashe River and diverted through a penstock to the Colley Wobbles Power Station. The power station discharges into the Mbhashe River.

== History ==
=== Development ===
The Mbhashe River rises in the mountains of the southern Drakensberg, and flows eastward across an undulating grassland coastal plateau until shortly after passing under national road N2, the river encounters southwest of Elliotdale and north-east of Dutywa the more rugged terrain of the Wild Coast and suddenly enters into a 64 km long series of violent twists and turns known as the Collywobbles before continuing more sedately to discharge into the Indian Ocean.

In 1980 the former Transkei Government commenced the development of four hydro power schemes in the Eastern Cape, Colley Wobbles, First Falls on the Mthatha river, Second Falls on the same river and Ncora on the Tsomo River.

The power stations were initially owned and operated by the Transkei Electricity Supply Corporation (TESCOR), until in April 1995 all four of them were transferred to Eskom.

=== Construction ===
Construction commenced in 1982.

=== Commissioning ===
The power station was commissioned in 1985.

=== Flood proofing ===
Following the commissioning of Colley Wobbles it became apparent after several floods that inadequate research had been undertaken into peak flows in the catchment. In February 1985 a flood of 2,000 cumecs and later that same year 3,000 cumecs followed in 1986 by a flood of 1,000 cumecs, all above the estimated 100 year flood flows. As a result, the station was flooded and it was necessary to then flood-proof the power station at considerable expense.

== Design ==
The series of twists and turns that the Mbhashe River takes through the Collywobbles means that at one point on the river where it twists close together a concrete dam in the northern bend allowed the impounding of the river to create a lake from which water is diverted via a 1.4 km long by 4.6 m diameter dual lined tunnel operating at 14 bars to the powerhouse on the southern bend. In during an average head of 135 metres is obtained by bypassing the 34 km that the river meanders between the dam and the power station.

The powerhouse houses three Boving Francis turbines each driving a 14 MW, 11 kV synchronous generator to give a total station output of 42 MW. The power station has provision for the installation of a future fourth machine.

Due to the design of the draft tubes and tailrace the generating units do not have the ability to provide voltage support by operating as a synchronous condenser (SCO mode).

At full load the power station consumes 38 cumecs of water.

The voltage generator voltage is stepped up to 66 kV. The 66 kV system is connected through a 66/132 kV interconnecting transformer for regional distribution with the Butterworth Substation, First Falls, Second Falls and Ncora power stations.

=== Modifications ===
In 1985 cracks developed in the first 50 metres of the concrete-lined tunnel, the resulting loss of water causing landslides. Boreholes were drilled on the hillside to prevent a build-up of water but it was only semi-successful. As a result, the tunnel was fitted with an extra 70 metres of steel lining to seal the cracks in the concrete.

The three turbines and the main inlet valves were refurbished in 2001.

By 2011 the auto voltage regulators and generator protection controls had been upgraded, the generator cooling had been fitted with closed loop towers and the SCADA and telemetry systems have been improved.

== Operation ==
It was originally intended that the power station would be operated as base load station during summer and as a peaking station in winter. The Mbhashe provides a flow of approximately two cumecs which gave the power station an effective storage of 2.5 GWh, which is equivalent to 60 hours of operation with all three turbines generating at maximum capacity.

To increase the output of the power station it is supplemented by water from the upstream Ncora power station on the Tsomo River in the neighbouring Greater Kei catchment, as well as from a diversion tunnel from the lake behind the Ncora Dam, that bypasses the Ncora power station. The water diverted at Ncora Dam takes approximately two days to reach Colley Wobbles. This inter catchment transfer of water ranged between about 115 and 150 million cubic metres annually over the last four years prior to 2008.

The soils in the Mbhashe catchment are naturally prone to erosion, which has been exacerbated by overgrazing, When it was commissioned in 1984 the lake behind the dam had a design storage of nine million cubic metres. By 1989 this had dropped to 7.5 million cubic metres and within three years of being commissioned it had silted up by 25%, and by 2011 it had dropped to 0.5 million cubic metres. As well as reducing the storage capacity the silt particles entering the tunnel and passing through increase wear and tear on the turbines. As a result, it is necessary to drain the reservoir at least twice a year to scour the silt. The power station operates with a 70% utilisation, of which 100% is in the wet summer season, and 30% during the dry winter season (with the rest in regulating voltage). Since so much storage capacity has been lost due to siltation, the power station normally operates around-the-clock during summer, but in winter there is sufficient storage to allow two of the three generating units to operate over the morning and evening peak periods.

== See also ==
- Energy in South Africa
- Electricity sector in South Africa
