= Jessie M. Soga =

Contralto and suffragist (1870–1954)

Jessie Margaret Soga LRAM
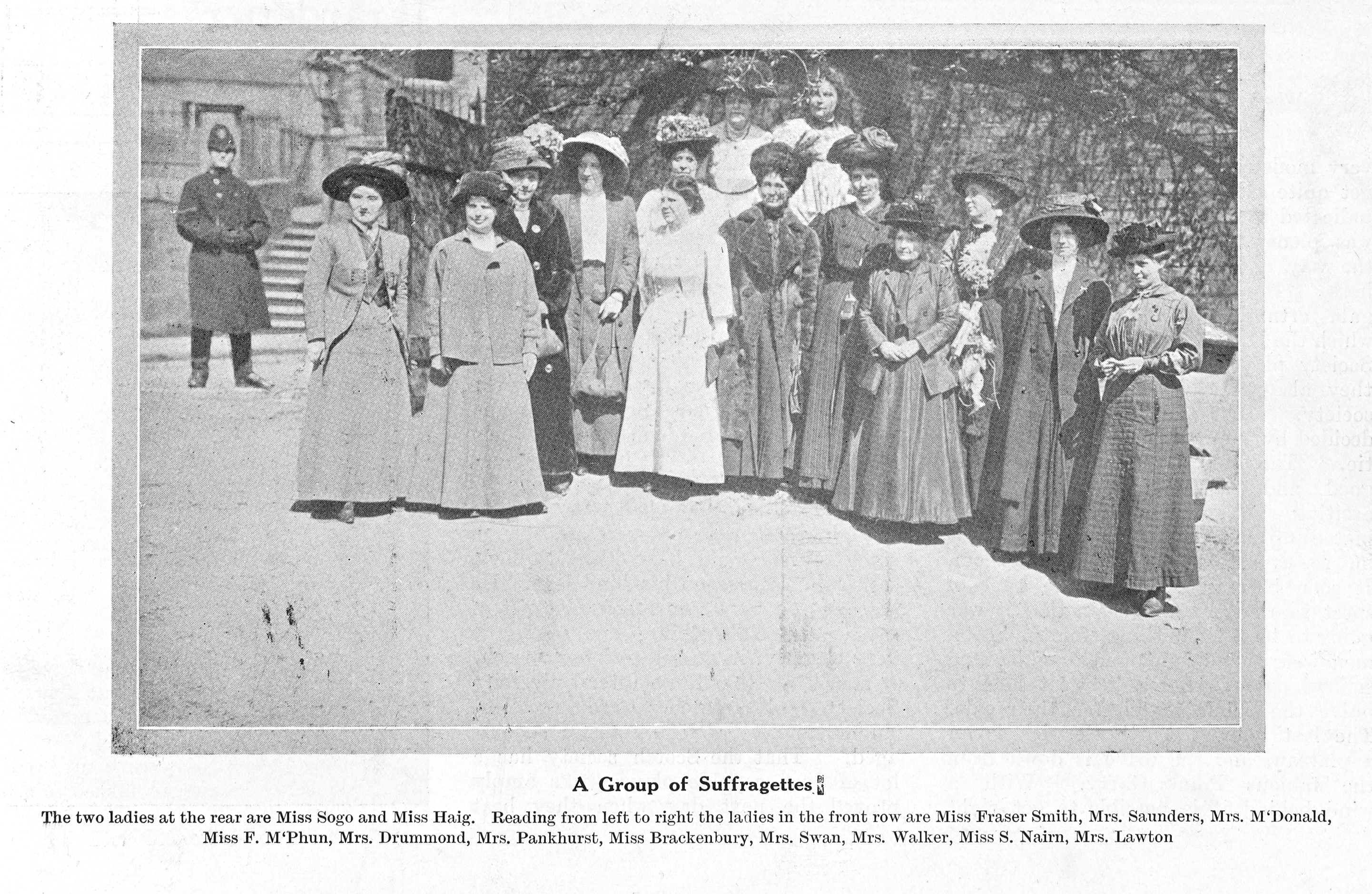
- Born: 21 August 1870; Transkei Cape, South Africa
- Died: 23 February 1954 (aged 83); Rottenrow, Glasgow, Scotland
- Education: Dollar Academy, Royal Academy of Music, London
- Occupations: Contralto singer and music teacher
- Organization: Women's Freedom League Women's Social and Political Union
- Known for: classical singer and suffrage campaign organiser
- Parents: Father Reverend Tiyo Soga Mother Janet Burnside female Christian missionary
- Relatives: one of 8 siblings: 5 brothers (one died at birth) and 3 sisters including Jotello Festiri Soga South African veterinary specialist

Signature
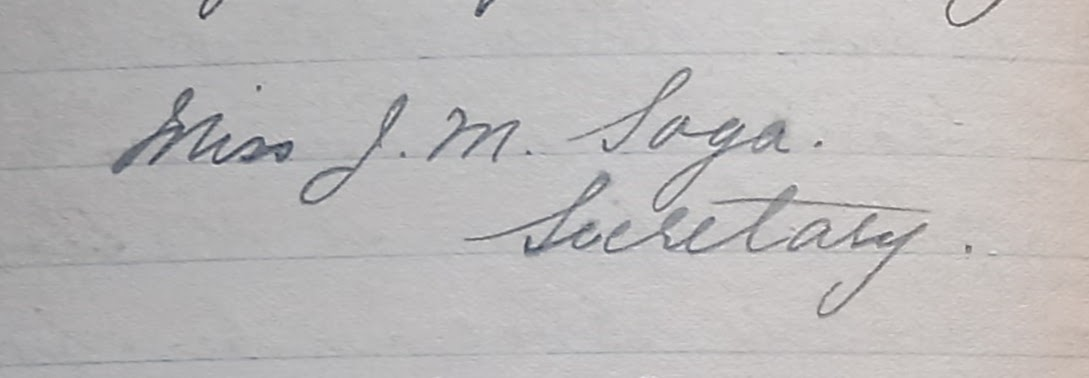

Jessie Margaret Soga, LRAM (21 August 1870 – 23 February 1954 was a Xhosa/Scottish contralto singer, music teacher and suffragist. She has been described as the only mixed race suffrage campaigner based in Scotland, Soga was a lead member of the Women's Freedom League in Glasgow and later joined the Women's Social and Political Union; but did not carry out militant activity, instead using her organisational skills and musical talent to raise funds.

== Family and early life ==
Jessie Soga was the youngest daughter of Reverend Tiyo Soga (1831–1871), the first black South African minister to be ordained, who became a missionary and translator. She was born in Tutura (Somerville) in Transkei, the Cape, South Africa, a year before her father's death in 1871. Her mother was Scottish missionary Janet Burnside (1827–1903), who met her husband when he was in Scotland whilst studying theology in Glasgow. Her mother and siblings returned to Scotland when he died, and Jessie and all the other children went to school at Dollar Academy.

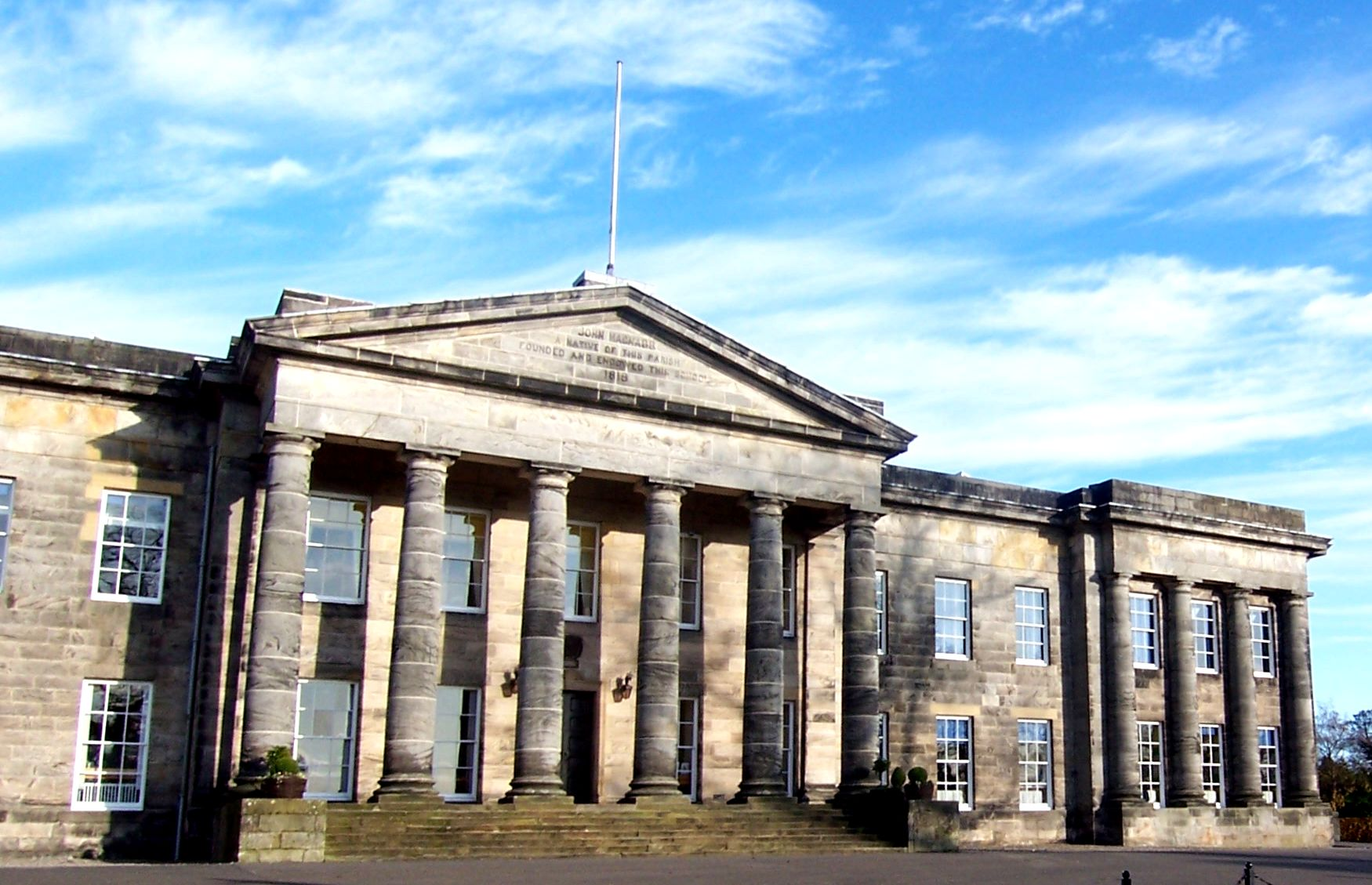
Dollar Academy – Playfair Building

She attended and had fees paid from 1879 to 1882. In 1882, Jessie was commended in her sewing class, then ten years later took courses in 1892 at the Edinburgh School of Art and was awarded 1st Prize for "Study in Ornamental Design" (for which she received £1 10 shillings; this was one of a number of special prizes awarded to students by the Board of Manufacturers). Soga also gained a 2nd class level pass for Plant Drawing in Outline. She was very highly commended in The Girl's Own Paper puzzle competition in 1896. She was already teaching singing, and performing by then, for example as soloist at the Kelvingrove United Presbyterian Choir's "very creditable performance" of The Wreck of the Hesperus, and as soloist at Coatbridge Corporation Recitals.

The Soga siblings, apart from Jessie, returned to live in South Africa: William Anderson Soga (1858–1948) who became a doctor and missionary; John Henderson Soga (1860–1941), who also became a missionary; Allan Kirkland Soga (1861–1938), an early mover in the African National Congress; her sisters, Isabella Macfarlane Soga (1864–1884) and Frances Maria Anne Soga (1868–1942) also worked in Christian missions, and Jotello Festiri Soga (1865–1906), who became South Africa's first black veterinary surgeon. Jessie stayed with her mother and they holidayed with a friend in St. Andrews in August 1901.

== Musical education and career ==
Soga was described as a "new contralto" when she performed with other soloists in a Glasgow City Hall concert on 16 November 1895, and was already offering private music tuition.

Soga formally completed her professional studies in Singing and music in 1894 and 1895, under Richard Cummings, Llewela Davies and George E. Mott at the Royal Academy of Music, London, whilst living at 8 South Crescent, Bedford Square. Her qualifications were firstly as a singing teacher in December 1901 licenciate (LRAM) and almost a decade later in September 1910, RAM examiners, Henry William Richards and William Gray McNaught passed her for Voice-Culture and Class Singing.

The Royal Academy awarded Soga a Bronze Medal, and has featured her in the Academy's "Spotlight" series.

Her musical education and reach was international, as she had studied under Italian singing teacher Alberto Giovannini at the Milan Conservatory; he also taught Irish composer Thomas O'Brien Butler as well as Italian tenor Francesco Tagmagno and Austrian baritone Joseph Kaschmann. She also advertised being taught in Paris (presumably before he left for America in 1904) by Jacques Bouhy. One of Soga's own pupils was African-American Helen A. Moore of Fisk Jubilee Singers whilst on an international tour and performing in Glasgow, who said later (in 1930) that she rated Soga as "among the leading vocalists of the country". Another of Soga's pupils was Helen Leckie of Tureen Street Glasgow. Under Soga's tutelage, Leckie had won many singing prizes, including a Certificate of Merit in Glasgow and several firsts in Glasgow in Glasgow, Edinburgh and Cambuslang

Soga performed at a "successful concert" of Beethoven's Mass in C major with 90 voices of the Blairgowrie and Rattray Choral Society on 30 March 1899, when her solo singing was commended:

'"Miss Soga proved a great favourite. She is the possessor of a rich mellow voice, which manifests at times the caressing quality characteristic of a daughter of the Orient. She was heartily encored for her first song, and responded with a sympathetic rendering of Bonnie Wee Thing; whilst Stay at Home was sweetly interpreted."

Her outfit was also described in a section called "Some of the Dresses [by Helen]" as "old gold satin, veiled black-striped gauze, the rounded yoke of the high bodice being defined by graduated ruches of black chiffon."

Soga was a member of Wellington United Free Church in Glasgow, and was the Corresponding Secretary for the church's Christian Endeavour Society. Topics that were the subject of the Society's programme included Mission work and Temperance. The Society was for younger members of the church, and its aim was to "promote an earnest Christian life among its members.". A Register of Members of the Band of Hope includes Soga as a member from 1897-1902. According to the Church's Annual Report of 1901, there were twenty meetings during the year, with an average attendance of over 200.

Soga sang a solo "Like as the hart desireth" from Psalm 42 during a Social Evening in the church in May 1902.

On 1 January 1903, Soga was the contralto soloist in the Coatbridge Choral Union "Grand New Year's Mid-Day Concert" performance of Handel's Messiah, but on that occasion she was described as "weak at the outset but she improved wonderfully as time went on ... her best effort was the passage 'He was despised'." She performed the Messiah again in Glasgow City Halls four days later and once more in Turriff on 15 December 1903, with their choral society.

The same year saw Soga taking part in a performance of Handel's oratorio Judas Maccabeus in Kirkintilloch, in which she sang the recitative "O Judas" and the solo "O lovely peace"". According to the "Kirkintilloch Herald", she deported herself excellently". The "Bearsden and Milngavie Herald" entitled her "Madame Soga", whereas the other female professional singer, Mary A Alexander, only merited the title "Miss".

Soga was one of four vocalists who, along with a Ladies' String Orchestra, entertained the audience at a concert in aid of the Queen Margaret College Students' Union Bazaar, This entertainment took place on 31 October 1906 in Hillhead Burgh Hall and was wholly classical in content. The extensive programme included works by Beethoven. Mendelssohn, Schumann and the lesser known Georg Gothermann. The website "Glasgow Cultural Heritage" reproduced a contemporary Glasgow Herald article. This described the audience's response to the performance as "highly appreciative". The same report stated that "Miss Jessie Soga, Miss Diana Phillips, Mr MacFadyen, and Mr Walter Lewis ARAM sang with such charm"

In September 1910 she passed the examination in voice-culture and class-singing at the Royal Academy of Music.

As she continued to perform at venues large and small across Scotland, with choral groups, or as a soloist, she also supported fundraising and political events, in 1910, singing for the British Women's Temperance Association in St Andrew's Hall, Glasgow at the World Women's Christian Temperance Union International Convention, with the international youth choir of 600 voices, and adding variety between speakers at local branches of the Temperance League or Land League. Its journal in 1919 noted "the success of the gathering was in no small measure due to the excellent entertainment provided by, [...] the songs by Miss Soga".

== Advertising for students in Glasgow and Edinburgh ==
Soga placed advertisements in the annual "Glasgow Post Office Directory" continuously from 1907 until 1922 in the "Teachers (music)" subsection of the publication's "Trades Directory".

The entries gave her name, the fact that she was a qualified LRAM (singing) teacher and her address-from 1907 to 1909 in Montague Street, Woodlands and from 1910 onwards at 7 Vinicombe Street; the latter is nowadays the location of an annual street gala. The street has a history of entertainment, as a cinema-the "Salon", which opened at No 17 in 1913, was recorded on the "Scottish Cinemas" website. The same website quotes a 1913 periodical, which described the area as "aristocratic". Another website "trove.scot" gives the name of the district of the street-Hillhead- and includes several images of the cinema.

Soga also advertised in The Scotsman for singing pupils, teaching weekly in a piano specialist salesroom, near a girls' school in Stafford Street, Edinburgh.

Soga used her singing talents and connections in organising entertainments or raising money as part of the leadership in Glasgow of the women's suffrage campaign between 1908 and 1917.

Soga took part in two concerts designed to provide humanitarian support for women and children affected by the consequences of the First World War; firstly at a War Relief Fund event in Balmore in November 1914 at which the vocal music was performed by a group of singers under her direction, Her duets with a Miss Hay were performed "exquisitely" according to the Kirkintilloch Herald

In the following year, in association with the noted elocutionist Marjorie Gullan, she arranged a dramatical and musical recital as part of a Grand Bazaar raising funds for the families of soldiers and sailors. The Bazaar, which took place in the Byzantine Galleries in the Royal Polytechnic in Glasgow's Argyle Street, was opened by noted suffrage campaigner, Lady Frances Balfour/

In 1924, Soga joined An Commun Gaidhealach but it is not known if she performed at any of the National Mòds.

The Woodside Choir, with Soga as conductor, achieved Second Place in the "Female Voice Choirs: Scottish Class" section of the Edinburgh Music Festival held in the Usher Hall in May 1928, as was reported in the Edinburgh Evening News. The Festival as a whole had attracted more than five thousand competitors.

== Involvement in women's suffrage campaign ==
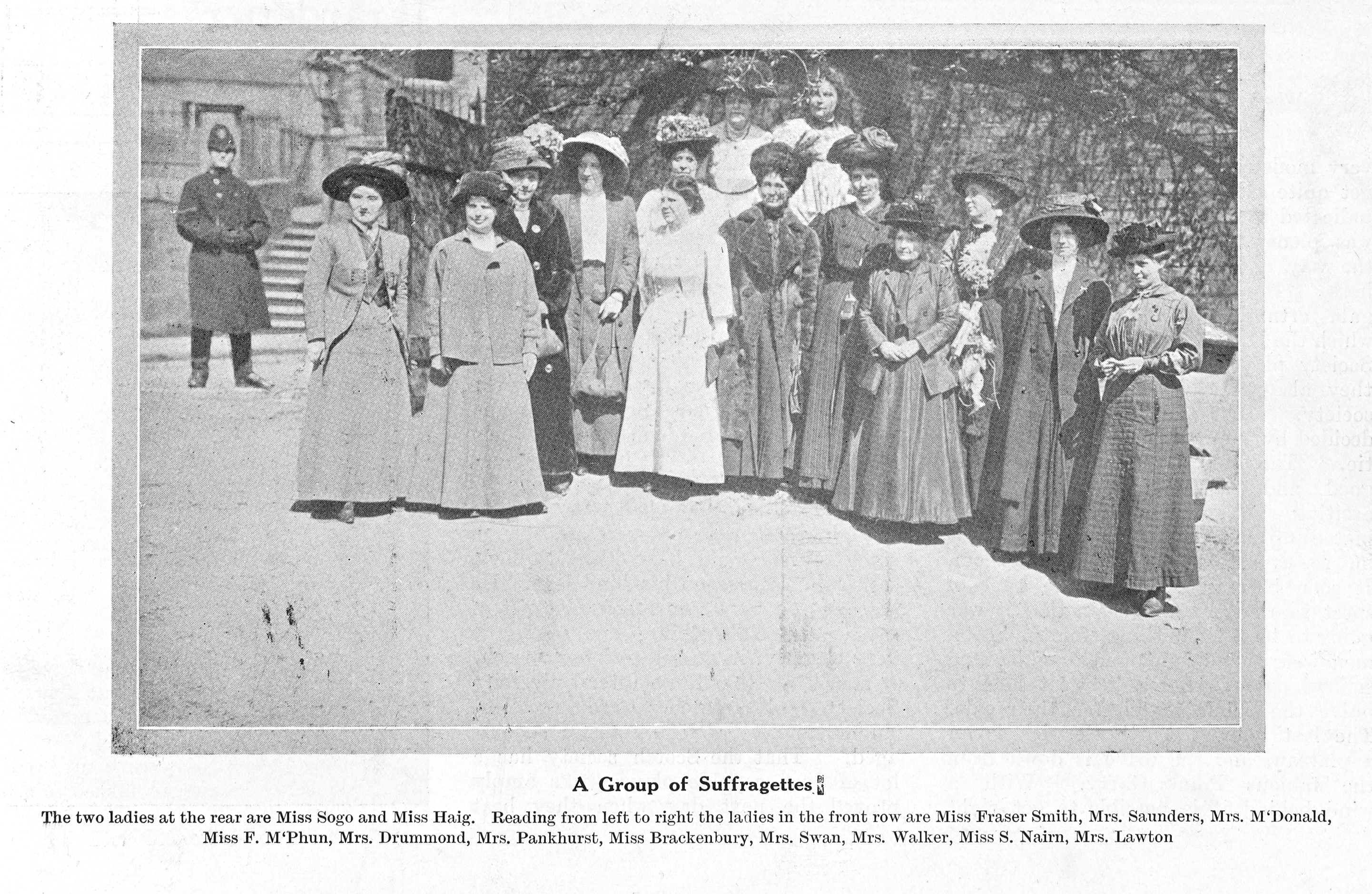
Jessie Soga (back row) in group of suffragettes at Bazaar in Glasgow (1910)

In 1908, Soga was one of the "prime movers", according to suffrage campaign leader Teresa Billington-Greig, in creating a large new Women's Freedom League branch in the prosperous West End of Glasgow (Hillhead). The public launch meeting at the Hillhead Burgh Hall greatly exceeded expectations, as the numbers overflowed the main hall and a second room, with a large membership as a result. Soga and E.S. Semple were appointed joint branch secretary in February 1908 and hosted an "At Home" event in the same halls in April, with Margaret Irwin (trade unionist) as keynote speaker.

The size and scale of events included national occasions, such as in March 1908, when Soga provided the singing, organised recitations and a violinist at an "overflowing" event at Glasgow's grand Grecian buildings (Prince of Wales Halls) to welcome released Scottish (WSPU) prisoners from Holloway. It was Agnes Husband of Dundee who welcomed the speakers Amy Sanderson and Anna Munro (both prisoners themselves, who shared a hymn sung in prison, and were already on the WFL National Executive Committee) and the other speaker was WFL leader Teresa Billington-Greig. By October that year, fortnightly branch meetings were being held, with Soga still joint branch secretary, now with M. Barrowman. Her name is mentioned in private letters between suffrage leaders Helen Crawfurd and Janet Barrowman.

Soga's model of a "Cafe Chantant" was one of the most successful events, in attracting large numbers and raising £75, and was rolled out to other branches.

According to Women's Franchise, the "chief attraction" was "Miss Molony", the prominent Irish. suffragette (see Mary Molony) She and Soga visited the City Chambers where they were received by the Lord Provost [Sir David Richmond] and some of the councillors.

She also organised the entertainment for the WSPU "Scottish Exhibition" at Charing Cross, and for smaller branch meeting socials. She made contributions from her concert earnings and teaching fees, including towards the London WSPU events. A group of leading suffragettes were pictured in Glasgow at a Bazaar on 7 May 1910, including Soga and Florence Haig (back row) and Miss Fraser Smith, Mrs. Saunders, Mrs. McDonald, Frances McPhun, Flora Drummond, Emmeline Pankhurst, Georgina Brackenbury, Annie S. Swan, Annie Walker, Miss S. Nairn, Mrs Lawton

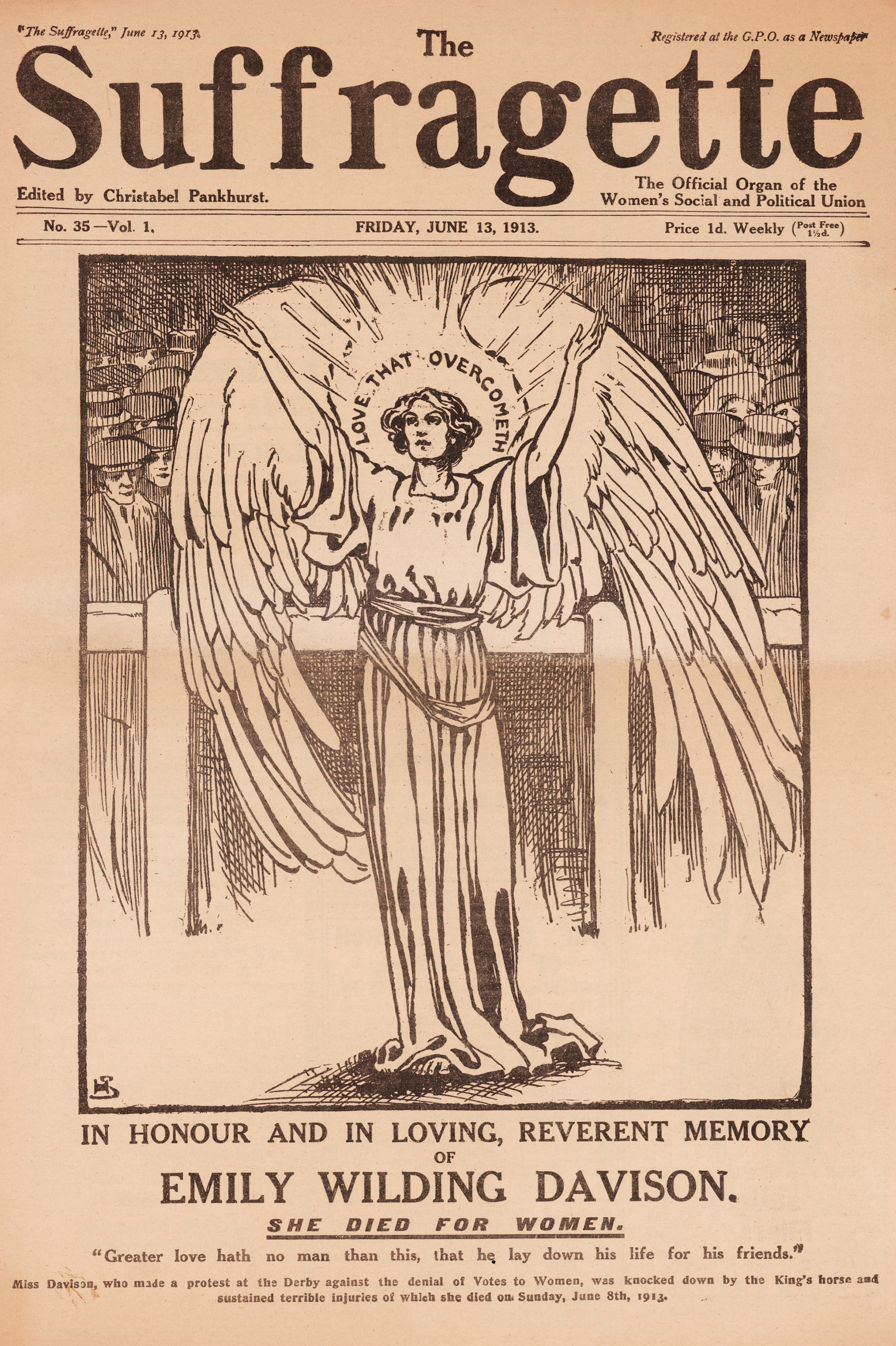
The Suffragette newspaper

Although involved in the Women's Social and Political Union she did not take part in violent protests. She chaired WSPU meetings in nearby towns, like Blackwood, and donated home-made marmalade for sale at events. She also organised a profitable circulating library, starting this a "small nucleus of two or three books". . Soga was also personally responsible for donating books to the WSPU Sauchiehall Street office, and donated for a six months' subscription to the WFL newspaper Women's Franchise to be sent to Woodside District Library Soga's involvement in WSPU ended around 1917, though WSPU had suspended itself when World War One broke out in 1914, in an agreement to end militant action in return for releasing women who had been imprisoned.

The 1918 Representation of the People Act gave some women the right to vote.

Soga died in the Old People's Cottages in Rottenrow in the early hours of 23 February 1954, aged 83, and her funeral was at the Western Necropolis Crematorium, Glasgow.

== Awareness of her role ==
Soga's role first came to public attention in 2021: the earliest version of this article was archived on the Wayback Machine in March of that year

The same year saw the publication of a 28 page article "Perspectives on the life and career of Jessie Margaret Soga" written by Ian McCracken and Joanne Ruth Davis

In 2024, the first known image of Soga was found in Scots Pictorial, and published on Wikimedia Commons, and she is to date, the only known Scottish woman of colour campaigning for the vote during the suffragette era.

Dr. TS Beall said Scotland's suffragists' and suffragettes' activities were 'not taught much' in Scottish schools, and their names were not generally known.

Soga was included in a new educational game (Top Trumps-style) called Scotland's Suffragettes Trumps, produced by Protests and Suffragettes (an artists, activists and local history group including Dr. Beall) by crowdfunding to send 700 sets to schools. Women's History Scotland's Dr. Yvonne McFadden called it 'a fun and important tool to make sure these women and their stories' are included in the Scottish school curriculum, as women's history is often limited in school history teaching.

Soga was also memorialised in 2024 in stained glass window by Artist Keira McLean in Glasgow's Woodside Library, working with young people from the local community. The window also features Suffragette Helen Crawfurd and was co-designed with young people from SiMY Community Development in Townhead. Artist McLean said "there are so many forgotten histories of people who made a real difference' to Glasgow, and that the window is "restoring the neglected histories of communities often marginalised or dismissed." The unveiling of the window took place at an event hosted by Glasgow Life on 5 September 2024 and featured new musical arrangements by Musician Lorna Morgan of the Holloway Jingles poems written by imprisoned suffragettes. Historical information about Jessie Soga and Helen Crawfurd was shared by Clare Thompson from Protests and Suffragettes.

== Last Will and Testament ==
Jane Sandell, acting in behalf of researcher Ian McCracken, obtained a copy of Soga's Last Will and Testament from the National Records of Scotland. Soga's Will stated that her remains should be cremated. Before Death Duties, Soga left £2968 in bank accounts and shares; those in the Anglo-Iranian Oil Company were left to the Merchants House of Glasgow for what she stated was "a small appreciation of my grateful thanks."

The remainder was left to Janet or Janette Soga, her niece (the daughter of John Henderson Soga).

== Further Information ==
Soga's name has been added to the website "PlainsightSOUND", an online history of Black Classical musicians in the United Kingdom. Her name and a short biography have been added to its timeline.

After Soga's death, a tribute to her was published in the Evening Times. which noted her success as a music teacher. and as a leading alto singer connected to Claremont Church and Bute Hall. The Bulletin, also published in Glasgow, amplified this by stating that she had taught many "now prominent" singers and musicians.

During her years in Claremont Church, Soga's contribution was widely admired, with the Kirk Session publishing a tribute by the Kirk Elder "Dr Scott" when she retired from the choir in 1932 "The members of Session have heard with deep sympathetic interest of the resignation of Miss JM Soga of the position in the choir which she has held with complete acceptance for so long a term of years. They have unanimously and cordially resolved to place on record their feelings of appreciation and gratitude to Miss Soga, not merely for the excellent and devoted service she has given to the praise of sanctuary, but also for the untiring interest she has shown for all matters concerning the welfare of the congregation, especially in its Foreign Mission enterprises. They have further resolved that a copy of this Minute by transmitted to Miss Soga, together with an expression of their hope that her years of retirement may be greatly blessed". Investigation into Dr Scott discovered that he was the Headteacher of the distinguished Hutchesons' Grammar School, who worked in the civic and academic spheres as well as the ecclesiastical one.

== Donations to Charities ==
Claremont Church’s Annual Reports contain the information that Soga made many donations to local, national and informational worthwhile causes: for example, eight different one in 1906. These included the Anderston Mission in Port Street, Glasgow, whose object was "to provide a home for young girls where whey can be comfortably housed and well fed" and "where everything within the home smacks of home"

Another local good cause that Soga supported financially was the Dorcas Society which was founded in Glasgow by Beatrice Clugston and which provided clothes for the poor.

Other charities to which Soga donated money included the United Free Church Home Missions and the same church’s foreign missions.

In total, Soga donated three pounds fifteen shillings in that year, (The equivalent of £609.50 in 2025 according to the British Pound Inflation Calculator
