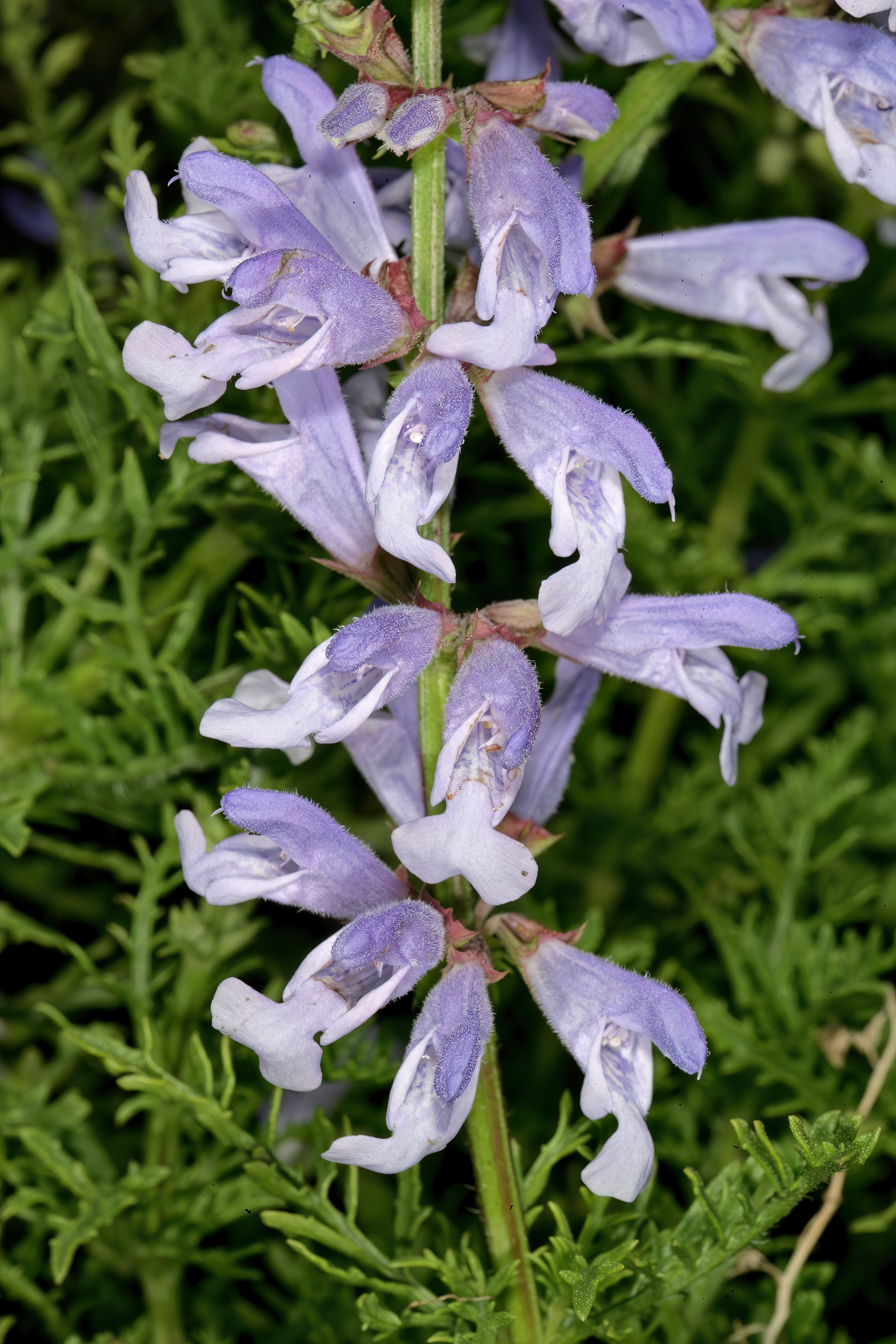

Scientific classification
- Kingdom: Plantae
- Clade: Embryophytes
- Clade: Tracheophytes
- Clade: Spermatophytes
- Clade: Angiosperms
- Clade: Eudicots
- Clade: Asterids
- Order: Lamiales
- Family: Lamiaceae
- Genus: Salvia
- Species: S. schlechteri

Binomial name
- Salvia schlechteri Briq.

Synonyms
- Salvia monticola var. angustiloba Skan

= Salvia schlechteri =

Species of flowering plant

Salvia schlechteri is a little-known species of sage sometimes called Xobo (Valley) sage. It is endemic to South Africa′s Eastern Cape province, where it has been found in loamy soil in the Xobo River valley and adjacent Collywobbles on the Mbhashe River.

The Red List of South African Plants has not determined its threat status, because the species is ″too poorly known″.

There is an artificial hybrid between S. schlechteri and S. muirii in cultivation.

== Description ==
Salvia schlechteri is a perennial herb, woody at the base, with erect to ascending stems up to 30 cm (12 in) tall. Stems are sturdy, four-angled, densely leafy, and sparsely hairy.

The bright green leaves are pinnatifid to pinnatisect, narrow oblong-elliptic in outline, with 4–6 pairs of short, irregularly toothed lateral lobes and a slightly larger terminal lobe; both surfaces bear numerous oil glands.

The inflorescence is short and unbranched or weakly branched, with up to seven verticillasters, each bearing 4–6 flowers.

The calyx is ovate-campanulate, about 9 mm (0.35 in) long, ten-veined, and sparsely hairy.

The corolla is pale blue and white, up to 25 mm (0.98 in) long, softly hairy, and distinctly broad-throated; the upper lip is nearly straight and the lower lip broad, with a wide median lobe.

S. schlechteri flowers from January to February. It is dormant in winter.

=== Identification ===
This plant belongs to a group of highly variable, frequently confused sages – including S. repens, S. runcinata, and S. stenophylla – most of which are present in the Eastern Cape. What sets S. schlechteri apart are its feathery leaves, which are not as thickly textured as S. stenophylla, and its relatively large, wide-throated flowers.

== Etymology ==
Salvia schlechteri is named for Rudolf Schlechter (1872–1925), a German botanist and taxonomist who was the first to collect the plant while on an expedition to South Africa in 1892–1895. His very extensive herbarium was sadly destroyed in the bombing of Berlin at the close of the Second World War.
