= William Anderson Soga =

South African medical doctor (1858–1916)

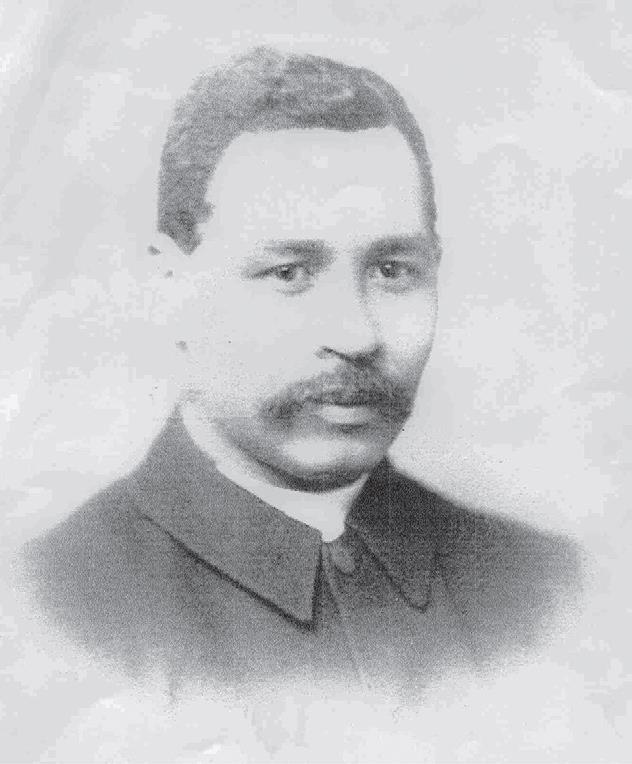
William Anderson Soga, undated.

William Anderson Soga (1858 – 15 July 1916) was a South African medical doctor and the first black African to qualify with an MBCM in 1883. He was also the first black African medical doctor to practise in South Africa, as well as being the first black African to obtain a doctorate MD. His thesis titled "The ethnology of the Bomvanas of Bomvanaland, an aboriginal tribe in South East Africa, with observations upon the climate and diseases of the country, and the methods of treatment in use among the people" was completed at the University of Glasgow in 1895. He was also ordained as a minister in the United Presbyterian Church 1885 making him one of the first medical missionaries in South Africa. Soga was involved in the running of mission stations, building churches, diagnosis and treatment of patients, research and writing.

== Early life and family ==
Soga was the first of Mrs. Janet and Rev Tiyo Soga's eight children born between 1858 and 1870. Soga was, according to his death notice and his matriculation certificate born in Peelton, near King William's Town (renamed Qonce in 2021). Soga spent his childhood at Mgwali mission station in Stutterheim, Amathole District which was run by his parents and where most of his siblings were born.

Of Tiyo and Janet Soga's eight children, one named Alexander born between William Anderson and his younger brother John Henderson was stillborn. The others survived into adulthood. John Henderson Soga was born in February 1860. The fourth son - Kirkland Alan Soga (also written as Allan Kirkland Soga) was born on 20 November 1861. Isabella McFarlane was born in 1864 Inverkip, Scotland. In 1865 the last of the Soga boys was born - Jotello Festiri Soga. Janet and Tiyo's second daughter Frances Maria Anna was born in 1868 in Tutura (Somerville) in the Transkei where the family moved around 1869. Jessie Margaret Soga was also born in Tutura in 1871.

== Education ==
=== Primary schooling ===
From 1867 William Anderson (age 9) attended Lovedale Seminary (later college), his father's alma mater. After ten years of building the Mgwali Mission Station and its congregation, the Soga family moved to Tutura in the Transkei in the eastern Cape. It was around this time that Tiyo and Janet Soga started preparing William, John and Alan to be educated abroad specifically in Glasgow, Scotland. In 1870 William, now 12 years old, John Henderson (age 10) and Kirkland Allan (age 9) departed from South Africa leaving behind their extended South African family, younger siblings (Isabella McFarlane, Jotello Festiri and Francis Anne), their mother (pregnant with Jessie who was born in June 1870) and their father Tiyo who was very ill at the time and would die on 12 August 1871 without having seen them again.

=== Secondary schooling ===
By arrangements made by their father William and his brothers were met by Rev. Henry Miller and his wife, and it is presumed that the brothers resided with the couple of Hammersmith, London, England. For their stay in Scotland, Tiyo Soga had entrusted his sons to the care of Mr R.A. Bogue and Dr William Anderson. Bogue was a member of Glasgow's John Street Church to which Soga had remained close. Bogue had been the financial sponsor of the elder Soga's education abroad, a donor to the Mgwali Mission and was a close friend. Anderson, after whom William Anderson Soga had been named was the minister of the same church, had baptised Tiyo Soga and was regarded by him as a mentor. William, John and Allan all attended the High School of Glasgow from 1870 to 1873 after which John and Allan transferred to Dollar Academy whilst William continued his schooling at the High School of Glasgow.

=== Tertiary schooling ===
Soga studied at the University of Glasgow (his father's alma mater) for eight years. He enrolled at the age of 17, initially studying in the Faculty of Arts. Simultaneously, he studied medicine at the University of Edinburgh (1881-2 and 1882-3), but graduated MBCM from the University of Glasgow on 26 July 1883, aged 25. Soga returned to the University of Glasgow to study for the MD higher degree. His handwritten MD thesis entitled 'The ethnology of the Bomvanas of Bomvanaland, an aboriginal tribe of South East Africa: with observations upon the climate and diseases of the country, and the methods of treatment in use among the people' was submitted on 20 March 1894. He graduated on 13th April 1894. Subsequently, Soga attended the United Presbyterian Church Divinity Hall (in Edinburgh). He was ordained as a missionary in 1885.

== Marriage and children ==
Soga (age 27) and Mary Agnes Meikle (age 19) married in 1885 in Cumbernauld Scotland. Around the time of their marriage the United Presbyterian Church (UPC) offered Soga a position at the Malan Mission in Willowvale located in what is known as the Amathole region of the Eastern Cape, approximately 32km southeast of Idutywa (modern orthography: Dutywa) and nearly 150 kilometres from Bhisho, capital of the Eastern Cape province since 1994. The couple voyaged to the Cape Colony in South Africa shortly after their marriage.

Two children were born to Soga and Mary Soga. Mary Agnes Buchanan was born at the Malan Station in September 1886. She was to marry Theodore Frederick Dreyer and assisted anthropologist Monica Wilson (née Hunter) with her research work in Pondoland in the early 1930s. Alexander Robert Bogue was born 3 October 1888. He followed his father into the medical field. He graduated with a MB ChB from the University of Glasgow in 1912; practised at Elliotdale and subsequently at Idutywa (today Dutywa) in eastern Cape.

Both Soga and his wife predeceased their grandchildren. Mary and Theodore had one child Ronald Ivan Dreyer who married Joyce May Thompson in 1950. Alexander Robert Bogue married Lillias Patricia Grandison. They had three children Dennis William, Donovan Grandison and Esme Margaret. Alexander Robert Bogue Soga died on 29 November 1949 at Frere Hospital in Idutywa where he was living at the time with Doris Eileen Soga (née Scherer - his second wife). They had no children.

== Working life ==
Soga started missionary work at the Malan Mission Station near in 1886. He was one of only five missionaries south of the Zambezi with medical training. It is recorded that in the short time (about a year) that he was at Malan Station, he established six churches, at Ramra, Bikana, Xonya, Shixini and Dadamba.

Soga and Mary worked at the Malan Mission Station. Subsequently, Soga was appointed as the first resident missionary to amaBomvana, a sub-section of amaXhosa who lived in Bomvanaland in Elliotdale between the Bashee (modern orthography: Mbhashe) and Umtata (modern orthography: Mthatha) Rivers brought under British rule in 1885. Soga described Bomvanaland as being mid-way between the Cape Colony and Natal. Within six months the couple had built a church and a school where Mary Agnes taught. In addition to his missionary work Dr Soga treated about two thousand patients per annum. He also made several trips to Scotland where he delivered lectures on the state of missions in the Cape to United Presbyterian Church audiences, while Mary Agnes delivered speeches to the Women's Zenana Mission.

In 1903, after about 17 years at Miller Station, Soga resigned his ecumenical position so that he could work as a physician full time. His younger brother Rev John Henderson, after ten years at Mbonda, relocated to Miller Station where he took over. Soga established a new medical practice in Elliotdale and in 1909 he was also appointed Justice of the Peace for Elliotdale.

Around May 1913 his son, Alexander R. B. Soga, who had qualified in Glasgow, joined Soga in his medical practice. Dr WA Soga applied to the United Presbyterian Church, Scotland to be reinstated in his ministerial capacity and was appointed as an honorary missionary. Shortly thereafter he retired from his medical practice and devoted his time to the ministry.

In 1914, Soga fell ill with cardiac complications. He died on 15 July 1916 on a golf course in Elliotdale. He was known as an enthusiastic sportsman, favouring cricket and golf, and a keen gardener. An embolism to the brain was recorded as the cause of death on the death certificate. Soga's wife continued to run his medical practice and dispensary with their son. Mary Agnes died in 1919 and is buried next to her husband at the Miller Church graveyard.

== Known publications and awards ==
"Locust-destroying fungus", published in the Agricultural Journal of the Cape of Good Hope (1897, Vol. 10(4), pp. 210-213).

1899 tract published in the Lovedale Press series on how to answer black doubts about the existence of Christ.

Pamphlet, "How to prevent consumption", originally published by William Hay. The revision was published in Cape Town, probably in 1905, by the "Association for the prevention of Consumption and other forms of tuberculosis in the Colony of the Cape of Good Hope".

In 2014, Soga was posthumously awarded the Order of Mapungubwe in Silver for "Being a trailblazer in the field of medicine and anthropology for the black generations of South Africa."
