= Collywobbles (Mbhashe River) =

Series of twists and turns in the Mbhashe River in South Africa

The Collywobbles is a series of twists and turns in the Mbhashe River in the Amathole District Municipality of the Eastern Cape of South Africa. It is one of the world's most remarkable examples of meandering in a river.

The Mbhashe River rises in the mountains of the southern Drakensberg, and flows eastward across an undulating grassland coastal plateau until shortly after passing under national road N2, the river encounters southwest of Elliotdale and north-east of Dutywa the more rugged terrain of the Wild Coast and suddenly enters into a 64 km long series of violent twists and turns known as the Collywobbles before continuing more sedately to discharge into the Indian Ocean.

In the area enclosed by the river's twists and turns, are the agricultural settlements of Msikiti, Zangcete, KuLombete and Mkhalalo.

The area is named after Lt. George Pomeroy Colley who was a magistrate in the Idutywa District from 1858 to 1860. On an inspection visit, he came across this unique geographical phenomenon in the river and upon seeing the spectacular view before him, exclaimed "How that river wobbles!" "Yes sir", replied a quick witted aid, "in fact, it Colley Wobbles!". Collywobbles is an English word for a stomach upset.

== Colley Wobbles power station ==
At one point on the river where it twists close together there is a dam in the northern bend from which water is diverted via a 1.4 km long tunnel to the Colley Wobbles hydro-electric power station in the southern bend to bypass the 34 km that the river meanders between the dam and the power station. The 42 MW power station was commissioned in 1985 by TESCOR, the former Transkei Electricity Corporation, and is now operated by Eskom.

== Collywobbles vulture colony ==
The Collywobbles is home to an important colony of Cape vultures. The colony which has existed since the 1890s has been known to support up to 300 breeding pairs (1989), but on average it is typically about 200 breeding pairs across 13 separate cliffs where they build their nests, particularly on Main, mSikiti and Ledger cliffs. The vultures use the rural grasslands and woodland south of Mthatha, but rely on the high cliffs for breeding.

The Collywobbles Vulture Colony has been designated as an Important Bird Area (IBA SA088) specifically to promote the conservation of this threatened species.
