= Trafalgar Marine Protected Area =

Marine conservation area (in region) in South Africa

- The location of the smaller Trafalgar MPA adjacent to the bigger Protea Banks Marine Protected Area
- Location: KwaZulu-Natal, South Africa
- Nearest city: between Port Edward and Margate
- Coordinates: 30.96109°S 30.30467°E
- Area: 8 km^{2} (3.1 sq mi)
- Established: 2004
- Governing body: Ezemvelo KZN Wildlife
- Trafalgar Marine Protected Area (South Africa)

The Trafalgar Marine Protected Area is an inshore conservation region in the territorial waters of South Africa in kwaZulu-Natal, between Port Edward and Margate.

== History ==
The MPA was proclaimed by the Minister of Environmental Affairs and Tourism, Mohammed Valli Moosa, in Government Gazette No. 21948 of 29 December 2000 in terms section 43 of the Marine Living Resources Act, 18 of 1998, and was transferred in 2014 by presidential pronouncement to Section 22A of the National Environmental Management: Protected Areas Act 2003, as amended, in 2014.

== Purpose ==
A marine protected area is defined by the IUCN as "A clearly defined geographical space, recognised, dedicated and managed, through legal or other effective means, to achieve the long-term conservation of nature with associated ecosystem services and cultural values".

This MPA has the specific purposes of protection of Cretaceous fossil beds, and protection of a subtidal rocky reef ecosystem with extensive seaweed beds and Natal ecoregion reef and pelagic fish. It is also intended to improve tourism facilities, and to maintain the ecological integrity of the reserve.

== Extent ==
The MPA protects 4.8 km of shoreline and about 8 km^{2} of ocean.

=== Boundaries ===
The MPA extends from the high-water mark and a line one nautical mile seaward of the high-water mark, and between, the northern boundary, and the southern boundary.

- The northern boundary is a line at 090° true bearing from the beacon at Centre Rocks and,
- The southern boundary is a line at 090° true bearing from the beacon opposite the southern boundary of the Mpenjati public resort.

=== Zonation ===
The whole MPA is a controlled zone where fishing is allowed from the shore and from boats with a permit. Only pelagic species may be caught from boats.

== Management ==
The marine protected areas of South Africa are the responsibility of the national government, which has management agreements with a variety of MPA management authorities, in this case, Ezemvelo KZN Wildlife (EKZNW), which manages the MPA by contractual agreement with DEFF, and liaison with a stakeholder MPA Advisory forum. with funding from the SA Government through the Department of Environment, Forestry and Fisheries (DEFF), which is responsible for issuing permits, quotas and law enforcement.

There is no specific management plan for the MPA but the plan developed in 2013 for the adjoining Mpenjati Nature Reserve has been approved and the MPA is managed in conjunction with the Nature Reserve.

== Ecology ==
Marine ecoregions of the South African Exclusive Economic Zone: Trafalgar Marine Protected Area is in the Natal inshore ecoregion

The MPA is in the subtropical Natal inshore marine bioregion to the east of the Mbashe River, which extends northeastwards to Cape Vidal. There are a moderate proportion of species endemic to South Africa along this coastline.

Two major habitats exist in the sea in this region, distinguished by the nature of the substrate. The substrate, or base material, is important in that it provides a base to which an organism can anchor itself, which is vitally important for those organisms which need to stay in one particular kind of place. Rocky shores and reefs provide a firm fixed substrate for the attachment of plants and animals. Some of these may have Kelp forests, which reduce the effect of waves and provide food and shelter for an extended range of organisms. Sandy beaches and bottoms are a relatively unstable substrate and cannot anchor kelp or many of the other benthic organisms. Finally there is open water, above the substrate and clear of the kelp forest, where the organisms must drift or swim. Mixed habitats are also frequently found, which are a combination of those mentioned above. There are no significant estuarine habitats in the MPA.

Rocky shores and reefs There are rocky reefs and mixed rocky and sandy bottoms. For many marine organisms the substrate is another type of marine organism, and it is common for several layers to co-exist. Examples of this are red bait pods, which are usually encrusted with sponges, ascidians, bryozoans, anemones, and gastropods, and abalone, which are usually covered by similar seaweeds to those found on the surrounding rocks, usually with a variety of other organisms living on the seaweeds.

The type of rock of the reef is of some importance, as it influences the range of possibilities for the local topography, which in turn influences the range of habitats provided, and therefore the diversity of inhabitants. Sandstone and other sedimentary rocks erode and weather very differently, and depending on the direction of dip and strike, and steepness of the dip, may produce reefs which are relatively flat to very high profile and full of small crevices. These features may be at varying angles to the shoreline and wave fronts. There are fewer large holes, tunnels and crevices in sandstone reefs, but often many deep but low near-horizontal crevices.

The open sea The pelagic water column is the major part of the living space at sea. This is the water between the surface and the top of the benthic zone, where living organisms swim, float or drift, and the food chain starts with phytoplankton, the mostly microscopic photosynthetic organisms that convert the energy of sunlight into organic material which feeds nearly everything else, directly or indirectly. In temperate seas there are distinct seasonal cycles of phytoplankton growth, based on the available nutrients and the available sunlight. Either can be a limiting factor. Phytoplankton tend to thrive where there is plenty of light, and they themselves are a major factor in restricting light penetration to greater depths, so the photosynthetic zone tends to be shallower in areas of high productivity. Zooplankton feed on the phytoplankton, and are in turn eaten by larger animals. The larger pelagic animals are generally faster moving and more mobile, giving them the option of changing depth to feed or to avoid predation, and to move to other places in search of a better food supply.

=== Marine species diversity ===
==== Endemism ====
The MPA is in the subtropical Natal ecoregion to the east of the Mbashe River which extends eastwards to Cape Vidal. There are a moderate proportion of species endemic to South Africa along this coastline.

== Threats ==
The MPA is too small to be effective in protecting the ecosystems. There is from oil and plastic pollution and illegal boat fishing in the MPA. The large number of boat launch sites outside but near to the MPA make it difficult to control fishing in the MPA.

== See also ==
Marine protected areas of South Africa

- List of protected areas of South Africa
- Marine protected areas of South Africa – Protected areas of coastline or ocean in the EEZ of South Africa
