= Jotello Festiri Soga =

South African veterinary surgeon

- Born: 1865; Transkei, Cape Colony
- Died: 6 December 1906 (aged 40–41); Amalinda, East London, Cape Colony
- Education: Edinburgh College of Medicine and Veterinary Medicine
- Known for: Rinderpest
- Scientific career
- Fields: Veterinary surgeon

Jotello Festiri Soga (1865 – 6 December 1906) was South Africa's first black veterinary surgeon who played a leading role in eradicating rinderpest. The library at the Faculty of Veterinary Science at the University of Pretoria is named for him.

== Early life ==
Soga was born in 1865 at the Mgwali Mission, in the former Transkei, South Africa, the fourth and youngest son of Reverend Tiyo Soga (1831–1871), and Scottish missionary Janet Burnside (1827–1903). The couple met when Tiyo Soga was studying theology in Glasgow. Soga's father Tiyo had been keen for his children to be educated in Scotland. After Tiyo's death in 1871, Janet relocated the family to Scotland and Jotello and his siblings were educated initially at the Dollar Academy. Jotello Soga went on to study veterinary medicine at Edinburgh College of Medicine and Veterinary Medicine from 1882 to 1886. He qualified as a Member of the Royal College of Veterinary Surgeons in 1886, with a gold medal distinction in botany.

== Personal life ==
Apart from his youngest sister, Jessie Margaret Soga, LRAM contralto singer and suffragist who remained in Scotland, Soga and his siblings all returned to work and live in South Africa. William Anderson Soga (1858–1948) became a doctor and missionary; John Henderson Soga (1860–1941) also became a missionary; Allan Kirkland Soga (1861–1938) was an early mover in the African National Congress; his sisters, Isabella Macfarlane Soga (1864–1884) and Frances Maria Anne Soga (1868–1942) worked in Christian missions.

Like his father, though Jotello Soga also married a Scottish woman, Catherine Watson Chalmers in 1892: three daughters, Catherine, Doris and Margaret were born of this marriage. Soga died on 6 December 1906 in Amalinda, East London, Eastern Cape.

== Early career ==
In November 1889 he was appointed as the second assistant to Duncan Hutcheon, Colonial Veterinary Surgeon to the Cape of Good Hope. The first assistant being John Borthwick. He was posted to Fort Beaufort and was also responsible for veterinary services for Victoria East, Stockenström and neighbouring districts. His immediate task was to inoculate against contagious lung-sickness, which was decimating cattle in South Africa. He conducted his own inoculation experiments on lung-sickness and his vaccinating method was accepted as standard thereafter.

== Eradication of Rinderpest ==
The second phase of his career began when the threat of rinderpest was on the horizon in the early 1890s. To the north, cattle were becoming sick and dying by the thousands. "Like some belated biblical plague of Egypt . . . it left a trail of bleaching bones and poverty," said one historian of that period. Dr. Soga was among the first to warn of the dangers rinderpest posed to the Cape Colony. "Our new Colonial enemy is rinderpest," he wrote in 1892, "Lung Sickness and Redwater are simple fools to it."

== Memorial ==
The library at the Faculty of Veterinary Science at the University of Pretoria was named in his honour on 5 May 2009

== Publications ==
His publications include:

- Disease "Nenta" in goats, Pretoria, 1891, hdl:2263/10564
- Stamping out rinderpest, Pretoria, 1896, hdl:2263/13445
- Castration - advocating the method of torsion, Pretoria, 1893, hdl:2263/13453
- Rinderpest, Pretoria, 1892, hdl:2263/13454
