= Protea Banks Marine Protected Area =

Marine conservation area in KwaZulu-Natal, South Africa

- The bigger Protea Banks MPA location adjacent to the Trafalgar Marine Protected Area
- Location: KwaZulu-Natal South Coast, South Africa
- Nearest city: Shelly Beach, KwaZulu-Natal
- Coordinates: 30°50.3′S 30°57.1′E
- Area: 1,200 km^{2} (460 sq mi)
- Established: 2004
- Governing body: ??

The Protea Banks Marine Protected Area is a marine conservation area on the continental shelf edge off the South Coast of KwaZulu-Natal in South Africa.

Seven species of shark are known to aggregate in this area, including hammerheads, ragged-tooth and giant guitarsharks. Several undescribed species of fish, corals and comb jellies have been observed. The Sardine Run occurs in this area and the new MPA is expected to support a tourism economy. Sharks are fully protected throughout the MPA because of their ecotourism value. Three submarine canyons and a spawning area for commercial linefish will be protected

== Purpose ==
A marine protected area is defined by the IUCN as "A clearly defined geographical space, recognised, dedicated and managed, through legal or other effective means, to achieve the long-term conservation of nature with associated ecosystem services and cultural values".

== Extent ==
The MPA extends from the Mzimkulu River in the north to the Mpenjati Estuary in the south. The Protea Banks Marine Protected Area in KwaZulu-Natal is an offshore marine protected area in the 20 m to 3000 m depth range. It is adjacent to the much smaller Trafalgar Marine Protected Area. The MPA includes the sea bed, water column and subsoil within the boundaries.

Area of sea protected by the MPA is about 1200 km^{2}

=== Boundaries ===
The Protea Banks Marine Protected Area boundaries are:

- Northern boundary: S30°30’, E30°42’ to S31°30’, E30°42’
- Eastern boundary: S31°30’, E30°42’ to S31°30’, S30°58.672’
- Southern boundary: S31°30’, S30°58.672’ to S30°18’, E30°58.672’
- Western boundary: S30°18’, E30°58.672’ to S30°19.587’, E30°56.660’ along the eastern boundary of the Trafalgar MPA, to S30°20.233’, E30°56.660’ to S30°30’, E30°42’

=== Zonation ===
==== Restricted areas ====
Protea offshore restricted zone:

- Panhandle northern boundary A S30°56.660′ E30°19.587′ to B S30°56.660′ E30°20.233′ to H S30°56.660′ E30°34.000′
- Offshore western boundary H S30°56.660′ E30°34.000′ to G S30°42.000′ E30°34.000′
- Offshore northern boundary G S30°42.000′ E30°34.000′ to D S30°42.000′ E31°30.000′
- Eastern boundary D S30°42.000′ E31°30.000′ to E S30°58.672′ E31°30.000′
- Southern boundary E S30°58.672′ E31°30.000′ to F S30°58.672′ E30°18.512′
- Panhandle western boundary F S30°58.672′ E30°18.512′ to A S30°56.660′ E30°19.587′, which is the offshore boundary of the existing Trafalgar Marine Protected Area

==== Controlled areas ====
Protea offshore controlled-pelagic zone (the central portion of the Protea Banks Marine Protected Area) is within the boundaries:

- Northern boundary: I S30°49.000′ E30°28.000′ to J S30°49.000′ E30°34.000′
- Eastern boundary: J S30°49.000′ E30°34.000′ to K S30°55.300′ E30°34.000′
- Southern boundary: K S30°55.300′ E30°34.000′ to L S30°55.300′ E30°28.000′
- Western boundary: L S30°55.300′ E30°28.000′ to I S30°49.000′ E30°28.000′

Protea offshore controlled zone (the remaining section of the Protea Banks Marine Protected Area) is within the boundaries:

- Northern boundary: G S30°42.000′ E30°34.000′ to C S30°42.000′ E30°30.000′
- Western boundary: C S30°42.000′ E30°30.000′ to B S30°56.660′ E30°20.233′
- Southern boundary: B S30°56.660′ E30°20.233′ to H S30°56.660′ E30°34.000′
- Eastern boundary of southern panhandle: H S30°56.660′ E30°34.000′ to K S30°55.300′ E30°34.000′
- Northern boundary of southern panhandle: K S30°55.300′ E30°34.000′ to L S30°55.300′ E30°28.000′
- Eastern boundary of middle section: L S30°55.300′ E30°28.000′ to I S30°49.000′ E30°28.000′
- Southern boundary of northern panhandle: I S30°49.000′ E30°28.000′ to J S30°49.000′ E30°34.000′
- Eastern boundary of northern panhandle: J S30°49.000′ E30°34.000′ to G S30°42.000′ E30°34.000′

== Management ==
The marine protected areas of South Africa are the responsibility of the national government, which has management agreements with a variety of MPA management authorities, which manage the MPAs with funding from the SA Government through the Department of Environmental Affairs (DEA).

The Department of Agriculture, Forestry and Fisheries is responsible for issuing permits, quotas and law enforcement.

== Use ==
=== Activities requiring a permit ===
==== Fishing ====
List of game and bait fish families that may be caught in the Controlled-Pelagic Zone of the Protea Marine Protected Area. All species in the listed families may be caught.

Pelagic gamefish species:

- Carangidae – kingfish, garrick, yellowtail, queenfish, etc.
- Coryphaenidae – Dorado/dolphin fish
- Istiophoridae – Sailfish and marlin
- Pomatomidae – Shad/elf
- Rachycentridae – Prodigal son/Cobia
- Scombridae – Tunas, mackerels, wahoo, etc.
- Sphyraenidae – Barracudas
- Xiphiidae – Swordfish/broadbill

Pelagic baitfish species (includes carangids and scombrids as indicated above):

- Atherinidae – silversides
- Belonidae – garfish
- Chirocentridae – wolf herring/slimy
- Clupeidae – red-eyes, sardines, etc.
- Engraulidae – anchovies, glass-noses/bonies, etc.
- Exocoetidae - flyingfishes
- Hemiramphidae – halfbeaks
- Scomberesocidae - sauries

== Ecology ==
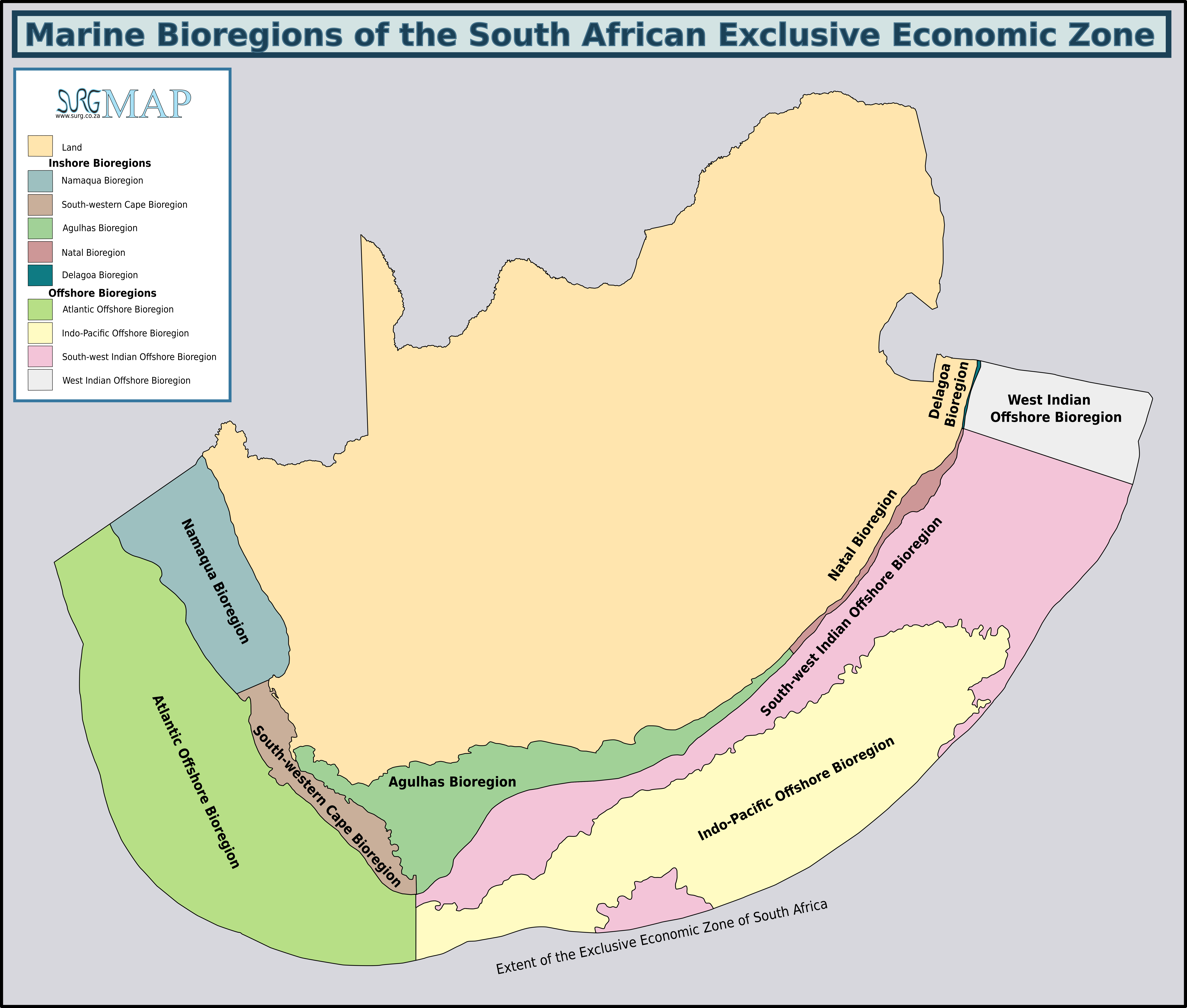
Marine bioregions of the South African Exclusive Economic Zone: Protea Banks Marine Protected Area is in the Natal bioregion.

(describe position, biodiversity and endemism of the region) The MPA is in the warm temperate Natal inshore marine bioregion to the east of the Mbashe River which extends northeastwards to Cape Vidal. There are a moderate proportion of species endemic to South Africa along this coastline.

Three major habitats exist in the sea in this region, distinguished by the nature of the substrate. The substrate, or base material, is important in that it provides a base to which an organism can anchor itself, which is vitally important for those organisms which need to stay in one particular kind of place. Rocky shores and reefs provide a firm fixed substrate for the attachment of plants and animals. Sandy beaches and bottoms are a relatively unstable substrate and cannot anchor many of the benthic organisms. Finally there is open water, above the substrate and clear of the benthos, where the organisms must drift or swim. Mixed habitats are also frequently found, which are a combination of those mentioned above. There are no significant estuarine habitats in the MPA.

Rocky shores and reefs There are rocky reefs and mixed rocky and sandy bottoms. For many marine organisms the substrate is another type of marine organism, and it is common for several layers to co-exist. Examples of this are red bait pods, which are usually encrusted with sponges, ascidians, bryozoans, anemones, and gastropods, and abalone, which are usually covered by similar seaweeds to those found on the surrounding rocks, usually with a variety of other organisms living on the seaweeds.

The type of rock of the reef is of some importance, as it influences the range of possibilities for the local topography, which in turn influences the range of habitats provided, and therefore the diversity of inhabitants. Sandstone and other sedimentary rocks erode and weather very differently, and depending on the direction of dip and strike, and steepness of the dip, may produce reefs which are relatively flat to very high profile and full of small crevices. These features may be at varying angles to the shoreline and wave fronts. There are fewer large holes, tunnels and crevices in sandstone reefs, but often many deep but low near-horizontal crevices.

Sedimentary bottoms (including silt, mud, sand, shelly, pebble and gravel bottoms) Sedimentary bottoms at first glance appear to be fairly barren areas, as they lack the stability to support many of the spectacular reef based species, and the variety of large organisms is relatively low. The sediment is continually being moved around by currents and wave action, to a greater or lesser degree depending on weather conditions and exposure of the area. This means that sessile organisms must be specifically adapted to areas of relatively loose substrate to thrive in them, and the variety of species found on an unconsolidated sedimentary bottom will depend on all these factors. Sedimentary bottoms have one important compensation for their instability, animals can burrow into the sand and move up and down within its layers, which can provide feeding opportunities and protection from predation. Other species can dig themselves holes in which to shelter, or may feed by filtering water drawn through the tunnel, or by extending body parts adapted to this function into the water above the sand.

The open sea

=== Marine species diversity ===
==== Endemism ====
The MPA is in the warm temperate Natal inshore marine bioregion to the east of the Mbashe River which extends northeastwards to Cape Vidal. There are a moderate proportion of species endemic to South Africa along this coastline.

== See also ==
Marine protected areas of South Africa
- List of protected areas of South Africa
- Marine protected areas of South Africa – Protected areas of coastline or ocean in the EEZ of South Africa
