= Ntsikana =

Christian Xhosa prophet

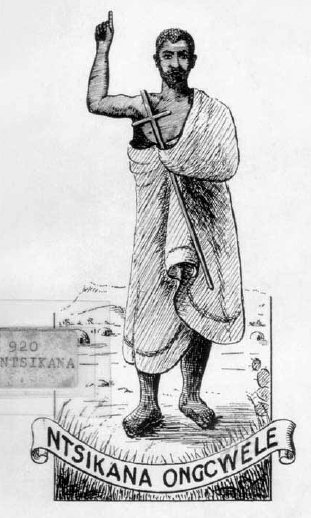

Ntsikana (born 1780-1821) was a Christian Xhosa prophet, evangelist and hymn writer who is regarded as one of the first people to translate Christian ideas and concepts into terms understandable to a Xhosa audience.

== Personal life ==
Ntsikana was born around 1780 to Gaba, a councillor to the western amaRharhabe king, Ngqika and his junior wife Nonabe in the Thyume valley, north of Alice. Ntsikana who belonged to his father's clan, the Cirha clan, was brought up around his mother's kinsmen until he was about five or six. His father sent for him having secured his rights by paying a beast for the child's maintenance since infancy. His father's great wife, Noyiki, who had a daughter but no sons, adopted Ntsikana who therefore became Gaba’s heir. From this time, Ntsikana made the Great Place in the Thyume valley, north of Alice his home. Ntsikana's first contact with Christianity coincided with his customary Xhosa initiation in 1800. In 1799, Johannes van der Kemp, a missionary of the London Missionary Society, arrived among the western amaXhosa and was permitted to set up his camp near to Ngqika’s Great Place. Van der Kemp soon became an attraction both for the king and his people, and in the year that he remained among them they had many opportunities to hear him preach and discuss with him his new teaching. When he left in 1800 van der Kemp could not claim any converts but he may have had an influence on Ntsikana. Ntsikana married two young women, Nontsonta and Nomanto, and settled between the Kat River district and the Peddie district in 1811. Later, he and his family moved to Gqore in the Kate River district. After converting to Christianity, Ntsikana divorced his wife Nomanto. Ntsikana died in Thwatwa in 1821.

== Christian work ==
From his first contact with Christianity through van der Kemp to 1815 Ntsikana led a normal life. His first spiritual experience was when he was at the kraal looking at his prized ox, Hulushe. As he watched, he saw a patch of light, brighter than ordinary sunlight, illuminating the hide of the animal. Ntsikana asked his companion, a young herdsman for corroboration but the young man denied seeing anything. Later that day, Ntsikana participated in Umdudo (traditional wedding dance). During his performance, a gale-force wind started and when he stopped, it ceased. When he stood up again to dance, the gale-force winds returned with lightning and thunder. Ntsikana did not fully commit to the Christian religion until he met James Read and Joseph Williams who were travelling with Dyani Tshatshu, son of Xhosa chief from the Buffalo River, near Fort Beaufort in April 1816. Read and Williams offered further scriptural teaching to Ntsikana, before inviting him to travel with them back to Bethelsdorp when they returned. But such a journey was impossible, neither his chiefs nor the British authorities would allow him to travel into the colony, so the missionaries advised him to remain where he was until Williams could return to establish the new mission station and offer him further instruction. When Williams returned he found Ntsikana had patiently waited for him and had moved his family from Thyume to establish his home in the Mankazana hills, close to where the new mission station was built. Each Saturday, with his complete household, he visited Williams to receive instruction and stayed until Sunday to join in worship. Now a fully converted Christian, Ntsikana divorced one of his wives Nomanto and denounced polygamy. In 1818, Williams died, and Ntsikane became the leader, establishing Christian communities in the Mankazana Valley and at Burnshill, Somerset East, Debe Nek, King William’s Town and Mgwali. Ntsikana’s Christian influence touched the lives of leaders such as King Ngqika, and his counsellor, Old Soga, the father of Tiyo Soga, and Tiyo’s older brother, Festiri.

== Conflict between traditional religion & Christianity ==
Ntsikana experienced an internal conflict between indigenous belief system (Inkolo yakwaNtu) and the foreign belief system (Inkolo yaseMzini)- Christianity. As a child he did not agree to be baptised by missionaries but became a Christian leader in life. He also acknowledged that Christianity demanded exclusivity meaning that he had to do away with Xhosa traditional belief systems. Ntsikana also had a rivalry with Makhanda who is also known as Nxele, a prophet under chief Ndlambe who was based in the area now known as Makhanda. Nxele rejected Christianity and western innovations, resisting the arrival of Europeans on the frontier during the Frontier Wars. Nxele called for the worshiping of Xhosa God, Mdalidiphu, while Ntsikana worshipped Thixo, the God of Christians. Referring to Nxele, Ntsikana once said "uNxele ubhuqukekile, ubalahlekisilani abantu?" (Nxele has turned upside down, why does he mislead people?)

== Music ==
Ntsikana also composed Christian hymns in isiXhosa which included “Intsimbi” (Ntsikana’s Bell),“Dalibom (Life-Creator), “Ingoma engqukuva” (Round Hymn) and “Ulo Thixomkulu” (“Thou Great God” - the Great Hymn).

== Legacy ==
Ntsikana is regarded as one of the first Christians who tried to adapt Christianity to African culture.
