= Mgwali River =

River in the Eastern Cape, South Africa

Mgwali
- Location in South Africa

Location
- Country: South Africa
- State: Eastern Cape

Physical characteristics
- Mouth
  - location: Mbhashe River
  - coordinates: 31°49′43″S 28°21′07″E

The Mgwali River is a river in Eastern Cape of South Africa.

The Mgwali is a tributary of the Mbhashe, a main river that drains into the Indian Ocean through an estuary located near the lighthouse at Bashee, south of Mhlanganisweni.
