= Tiyo Soga =

Xhosa journalist, minister, translator, missionary evangelist, and composer of hymns

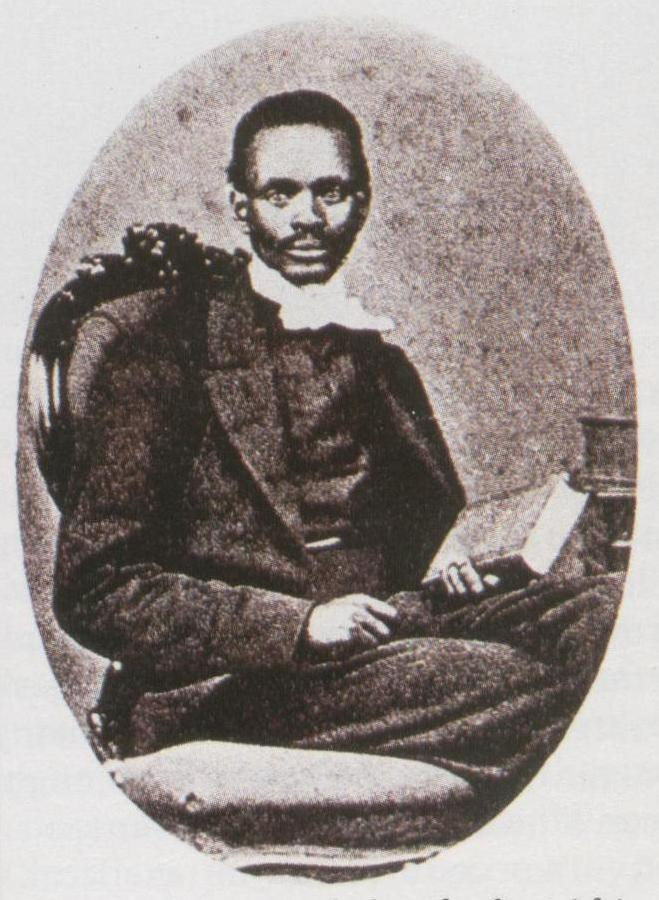
- Tiyo Soga.
- Born: 1829
- Died: 12 August 1871 (aged 41–42); Tutura, near Gcuwa, Xhosa Kingdom
- Occupations: Journalist, minister, translator, missionary evangelist, and composer of hymns
- Spouse(s): Janet Soga, née Burnside (1827–1903)
- Children: 7 surviving, including Jotello Festiri Soga and Jessie Margaret Soga
- Awards: Order of Ikhamanga in Gold

Tiyo Soga (1829 – 12 August 1871) was a Xhosa journalist, minister, translator, missionary evangelist, and composer of hymns. Soga was the first black South African to be ordained, and worked to translate the Bible and John Bunyan's classic work Pilgrim's Progress into his native Xhosa language.

== Background ==
Soga was Xhosa. When his mother Nosuthu became a Christian, she sought and received release from her marriage to Jotello, a head advisor of Chief Ngqika, on the grounds that she wanted her son to be raised a Christian and receive formal education. Nosuthu's request was granted, and she took Soga to the Thyume Mission. As a child in Thyume, Soga attended the school of the Reverend John A. Chalmers.

In 1844, at the age of 15, Soga received a scholarship to Lovedale Missionary Institution located 13 kilometres (8.1 mi) from Thyume. Soga's education was interrupted by the "War of the Axe" in 1846 and he and his mother were forced to take refuge in nearby Fort Armstrong. The principal of Lovedale, the Reverend William Govan, decided to return home to Scotland and offered to pay the way for Soga to come with him and seek higher education. Nosuthu agreed to let her son go. Not knowing if she would ever see him again, she is quoted as saying:

"My son belongs to God; wherever he goes God is with him... he is as much in God's care in Scotland as he is here with me."

Soga attended the Normal School in Glasgow, Scotland, and was "adopted" by the John Street United Presbyterian Church located there. During his stay in Scotland, Soga made a formal profession of Christian faith and was baptized in May 1848. During his time in Scotland, Soga also developed a sympathetic perspective for both the white and Black races, and his unique racial perspective remained with him for the rest of his life.

When informing readers about Soga's ordination, the "Paisley Herald and Renfrewshire Advertiser" stated that he had:

"evinced powers of no ordinary description" and had "preached with remarkable receptance in some of the principal Unired Presbyterian pulpits in Glasgow."

== Glasgow University studies and subsequent life ==
Soga was the first Black South African student of the university, matriculating in 1851. His professor for Latin was William Ramsay and for Greek Edmund Law Lushington.

After two years in Scotland, Soga returned to the Eastern Cape to work as an evangelist and teacher in Thyume. Soga was asked by the Reverend Robert Niven to help establish a new mission station in the Amatole Mountains, and he faithfully planted the Uniondale Mission in Keiskammahoek. Because of its identification with the colonial authorities, Uniondale mission was burnt to the ground by those at war with the colonial powers. Soga was almost killed in the incident, and refused to side with the chief leading the war or to accept the position of translator offered him by the colonial government.

Soga decided to pursue further theological education and accompanied Reverend Niven back to Scotland, where he enrolled at the Theological Hall, Glasgow, so that he might:

"learn better how to preach Christ as my known Saviour to my countrymen who know Him not".

On 10 December 1856, Tiyo Soga became the first Black South African to be ordained in the United Presbyterian Church. In March 1857, Soga married Janet Burnside, a Scotswoman who was "a most honourable, thrifty, frugal, and devoted woman who marched heroically and faithfully by her husband's side through all the chequered scenes of his short life". The service was conducted by Reverend John Ker at Ibroxholm, Glasgow. Throughout his life, Soga faced racism as a Kaffir and was treated as a second-class citizen by many whites in Africa. He also faced opposition from Black Africans, some of whom thought of him as trying to become a "Black Englishman".

On Monday April 13th, 1857, Soga started his journey back to Africa. He and his wife took the train to London, and then on Wednesday the Lady of the Lake to Africa. There they eventually founded the Emgwali Mission, where Soga worked among his native Ngqika people. During their years in Emgwali, the Sogas had eight children, one of whom was stillborn. Two of their sons – William Anderson Soga and John Henderson Soga – followed their father and were ordained as ministers and missionaries, and two of their daughters – Isabella McFarlane Soga and Frances Maria Anna Soga – were employed as teachers in mission. Kirkland Allan Soga, another son, studied law at the University of Glasgow and became the first Black lawyer in South Africa, and a politician involved in the founding of the African National Congress. His fourth son was Jotello Festiri Soga, the first Black veterinary surgeon in South Africa. The youngest daughter, born just a year before Soga died, Jessie Margaret Soga, became a classic contralto soloist and teacher studying in Milan and a licenciate of the Royal College of Music, London, and a leading suffragist. Janet Soga returned to England for the births of all her children. Tiyo Soga suffered from poor health, and it was during one of these bouts of sickness that he used his time to translate The Pilgrim's Progress (U-Hambo Iom-Hambi) into his native Xhosa language. Soga's translation and adaptation of The Pilgrim's Progress has been called "the most important literary influence in 19th century South Africa after the Bible." He also worked to translate the Christian gospels and served on the advisory board to revise the Xhosa Bible.

At the end of his short life, Soga was sent to open a new mission station in Tutuka (Somerville) in Kreli's country and the difficult work further deteriorated his health. It was the desire of Soga that his children be educated in Scotland and before his death, he instructed his sons, "For your own sakes, never appear ashamed that your father was a "Kaffir" and that you inherit some African blood. It is every whit as good and as pure as that which flows in the veins of my fairer brethren…You will ever cherish the memory of your mother as that of an upright, conscientious, thrifty, Christian Scots woman. You will ever be thankful for your connection by this tie with the white race".

Soga died of tuberculosis in August 1871. He died in the arms of fellow missionary Richard Ross with his mother, Nosuthu, by his side. He is considered by many to be the first major modern African intellectual and was among the first Christian leaders to assert the right of Black Africans to have freedom and equality.

Soga's fame had extended so widely in Scotland that there was even an obituary of him in the newspaper of its most northerly mainland settlement, John O'Groats.

== Financial support for Soga's widow and offspring ==
Discovering that Janet and her children were living in "straightened circumstances", the U P Church organised a special meeting to raise "subscriprions" for them. The meeting took place in the Church Offices in Virginia Street, Glasgow, and was chaired by R. A. Bogue. Prominent members of the church were in attendance. It was agreed to set a target of £1,200, a third of which had already been pledged before the end of the meeting.

== Hymns and poetry ==
One of Soga's hymns exemplifies his Xhosa heritage by setting the words of Ntsikana's "Great Hymn" to music. Ntsikana, a Xhosa chief, is remembered as the first important African convert to Christianity. Around 1815, Ntsikana started the first African Christian organization and went on to write four poetic hymns. His "Great Hymn" extols God as creator and redeemer, and still appears with Soga's music in modern hymnbooks.

Although Ntisikana died before Soga's birth, Soga was clearly influenced by his predecessor's poetry and example. Soga's tribute to Ntsikana includes the lines:

What "thing" Ntsikana, was't that prompted thee
To preach to thy dark countrymen beneath yon tree'?
What sacred vision did the mind enthral,
Whil'st thou lay dormant in thy cattle kraal?

Soga's "Bell Hymn", used to call worshippers together, is also based on a Ntisikana poem. African poet and playwright H. I. E. Dhlomo's play The Girl Who Killed to Save: Nongqause the Liberator incorporates the music of the Bell Hymn.

The character of Soga himself appears at the end of the play, heralded by other characters singing another of Soga's hymns, "Fulfil Your Promise." Lizalis' idinga lakho This hymn was sung long after Soga's death, to open the first meeting of the South African Native National Congress in 1912. "Fulfil Your Promise" may also have inspired the African National Congress anthem, "God Bless Africa". Soga wrote the hymn in July 1857, when he returned to Africa. It can be seen and heard on Youtube with full lyrics .

== Tributes and legacy ==
The Glasgow Daily Herald of 17 October, 1871, republished a tribute from an unnamed South African newspaper. The article described Soga as "a man of high educational attainments... Modest and retiring in manner... An earnest, devoted pastor and missionary" and "a man with few equals".

On the occasion of his ordination, the "Paisley Herald and Renfrewshire Advertiser" said Soga was a man "possessing powers of no ordinary description" and "had preached with remarkable receptance in some of the principal United Presbyterian pulpits in Glasgow".

The Mgwali (Emgwali) Church houses a Xhosa language Memorial tablet. The tablet was made by John Macfarlane of Dundee and is inscribed "He was a Friend of God: A Lover of his Son: Inspired by his Spirit: A Disciple of his Holy Word. An Ardent Patriot: A Large-Hearted Philanthropist: A Dutiful Son : An Affectionate Brother: A Tender Husband: A Loving Father: A Faithful Friend: A Learned Scholar: An Eloquent Orator: In Manners a Gentleman: A Devoted Missionary who Devoted Himself to His Master's Service." The words are by Rev Dr William Anderson.

A monument to Soga with his bust and a lengthy tribute exist in South Africa> It stands near to his grave. The Soga memorial was unveiled in 2011 by the one-time President of South Africa, Thabo Mbeki and Eastern Cape Premier Noxolo Kiviet in front of a crowd of over two thousand people, including descendants of Soga, relatives from as far away as Scotland and senior members of the clergy.

Comprehensive biographies:Tiyo Soga: a literary history by Dr. Joanne Ruth Davis was published in South Africa in 2018, Tiyo Soga: Beacons of Light from our Reformation History" by Dr. Ferdie Mulder and Dr. Ivette Coetsee was published in South Africa in 2024, and a stained glass lancet window in St. Andrew's Presbyterian Church, King William's Town, is inscribed "In memory of Tiyo Soga, Missionary".

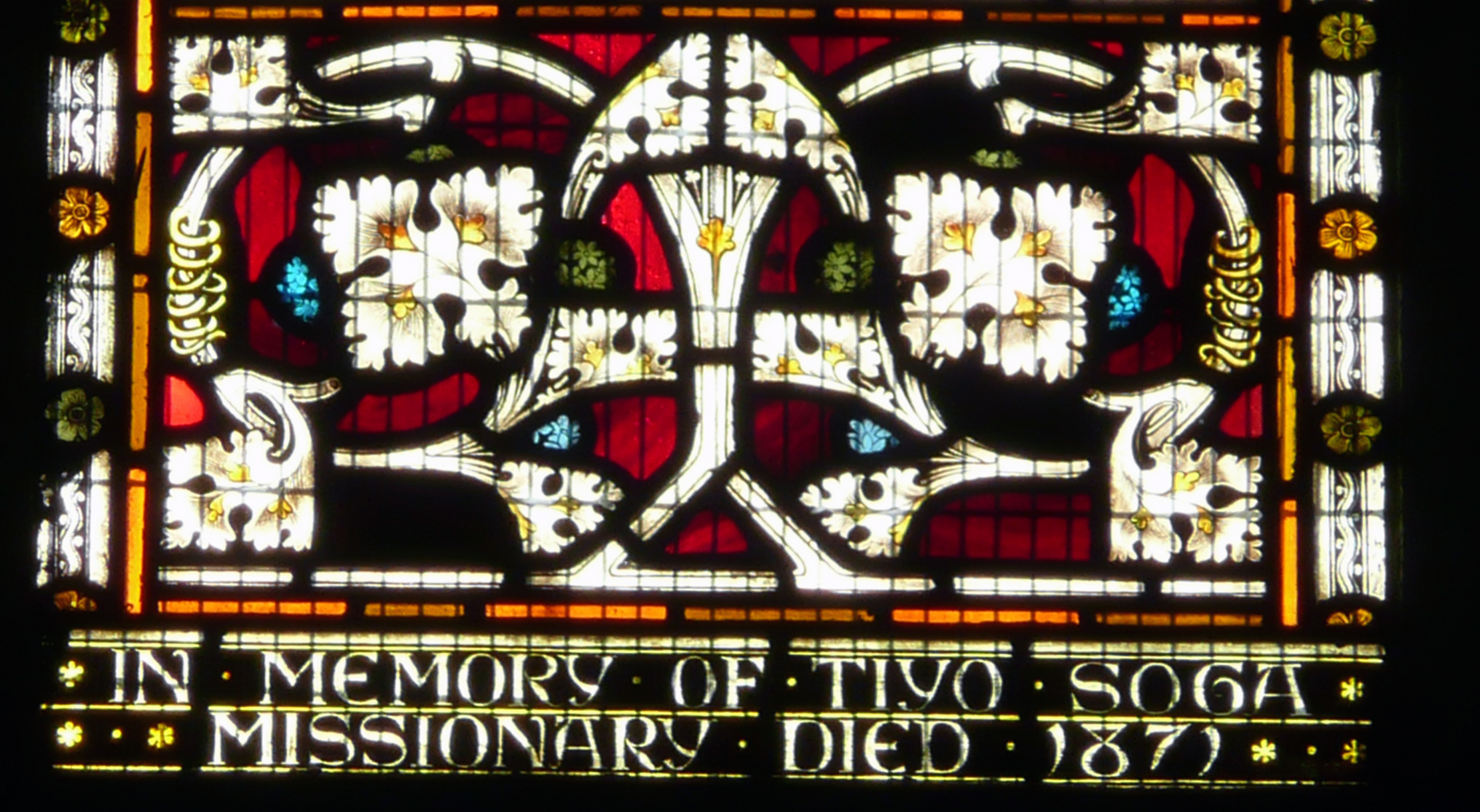
Lancet window in St Andrew's Presbyterian Church, King William's Town. Photograph taken and donated to this article by Dr John S Ross

There is a Tiyo Soga Memorial Church situated in Cape Town, and another in Langa.

A Memorial lecture on the theological and ethical principles of Soga by Reverend Doctor Bongani B Finca took place in 2011

As recently as 2022, Soga was being held up as an example of Scotland's "rich history of embracing immigration. ". In a long article on September 26th of that year, and headed with the photograph of a banner reading "Scotland welcomes the world", the National newspaper includes an outline of Soga studying n Glasgow and Edinburgh, and the fact that he married a Scot. The article concludes by saying "The country has a centuries-long history of diversity and multiculturalism"
