= Marjorie Gullan =

Marjorie Gullan MBE
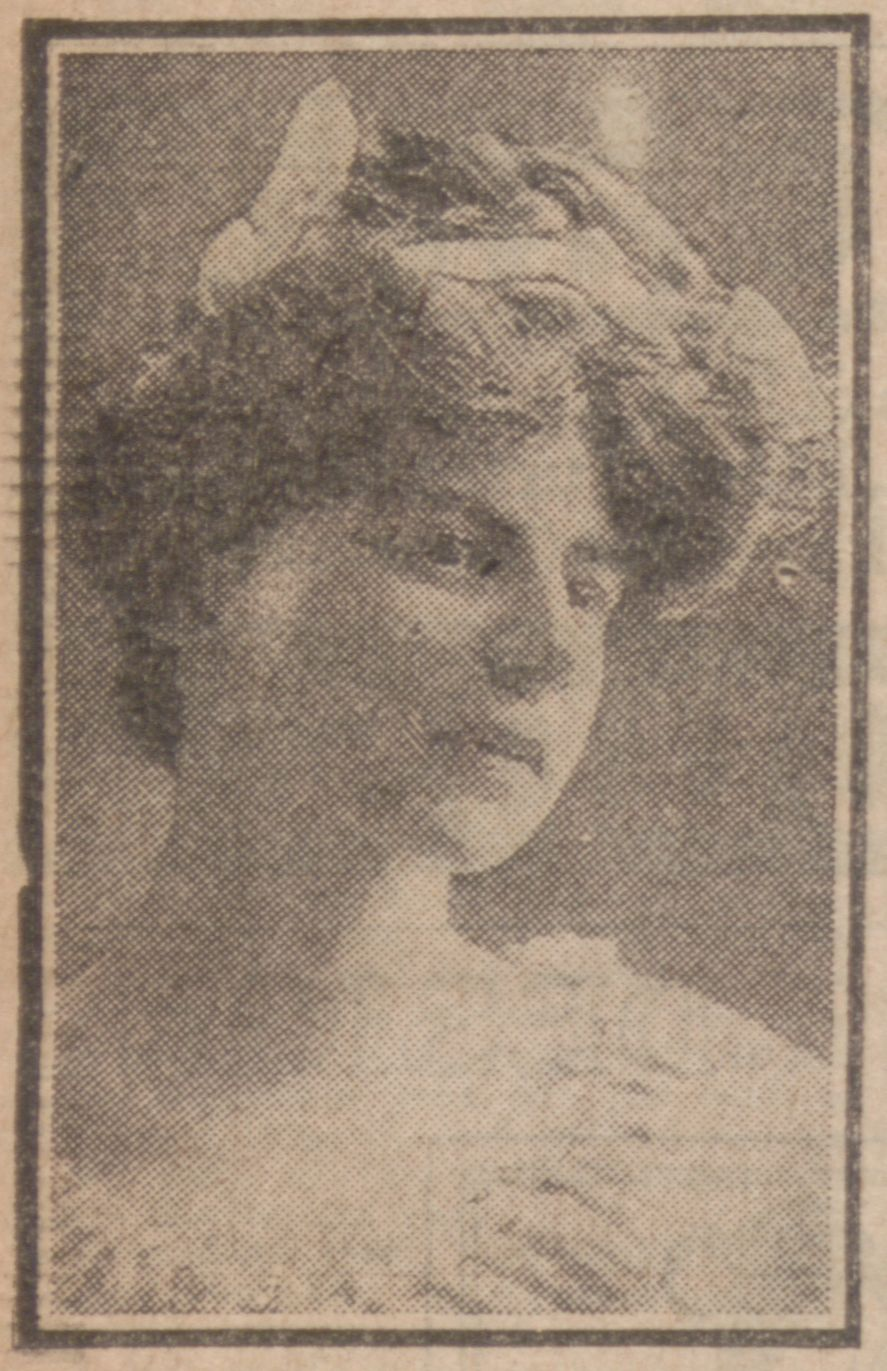
- Born: Margaret Isabel Morton Gullan; 1879; Reading, Berkshire
- Died: October 8, 1959 (aged 79–80); Reading, Berkshire
- Occupations: Teacher of elocution; developer of choral verse speaking
- Known for: The Marjorie Gullan Method of Rhythmic Movement to Spoken Poetry
- Movement: Choral speaking

Marjorie Gullan MBE (née Margaret Isabel Morton Gullan; 1879 – 8 October 1959) was an English teacher of elocution and co-founder of the Speech Institute, London. She is considered a pioneering figure in the development and popularisation of choral speaking, which flourished during the first half of the 20th century.

== Early life ==
Margaret Isabel Morton Gullan was born in Reading, Berkshire. In 1883, she and her family moved to Glasgow, where her father was appointed minister of the Augustine Free Church. Family friends included suffragist Helen Moyes and actor Graham Moffat. Gullan studied elocution and voice production in London, and by 1901 was listed on the census as an "elocution teacher".

== Career and verse speaking ==
In 1904, Gullan established a "School of Elocution" at 534 Sauchiehall Street, which went on to be successful. She also taught drama and elocution at Park School and Laurel Bank School. A progressive thinker, Gullan soon replaced the word "elocution" in her school's name with "dramatic art" and "speech training". A technique based on unison speech accompanied by rhythmical movements came to be called the Marjorie Gullan Method of Rhythmic Movement to Spoken Poetry.

Gullan was a leading figure in the British verse speaking choir movement, forming the first verse ever speaking choir, the Glasgow Nightingales, in Glasgow around 1922. This was the outcome of solo speaking performances by her students at the Glasgow and Edinburgh Festivals between 1919 and 1922, and drew on a tradition of choric speaking dating back to ancient Greek drama. In 1925, Gullan founded the London Verse Speaking Choir, and soon after published Spoken Poetry in the School. Also during the 1920s, two dedicated verse-speaking festivals were founded: the Oxford Recitations (later the Oxford Festival) in 1922, and the London Speech Festival in 1927. Verse speaking choirs were hailed as a unique way to appreciate and understand poetry, enabling participation by anyone who could talk.

Gullan encouraged the inclusion of speech courses as part the curriculum in schools and teacher training institutions. She was President of the Speech Fellowship, an association founded to promote these goals. From 1926 to 1938, Gullan taught speech training and voice production to teachers at the London Day Training College (now the UCL Institute of Education).

In London, Gullan became Head of the Department of Speech Training and Dramatic Art at Regent Street Polytechnic. In 1932, with Clarissa Graves, she opened the Speech Institute, where courses included choral speaking and puppetry. The trend for verse speaking spread to America, where Gullan undertook tours and gave lectures.

Shortly before the formal declaration of World War II, Gullan volunteered as a director in a relocation center in Kettering, where she was responsible for the care and education of over 200 children from London's poorest districts.

Gullan was also the author of eight textbooks and anthologies, and the sponsor sponsor the journal Good Speech (later Speech News). In 1952, Gullan was made an MBE, for her achievements in establishing speech training in schools and renewed interest in choral speaking. Facing declining enrolments as many schools established their own voice training courses, the Speech Institute closed in 1953.

== Death and legacy ==
Marjorie Gullan died in Reading in 1959. John Hampden, writing in The Times, said:

The news of Marjorie Gullan’s death in hospital on October 8 will sadden her friends and admirers in many countries of the English-speaking world. Her ideas have spread so far that many people must have adopted them without knowing them to be hers, but her books are still widely used and the older generation of teachers and educationists remember the great pioneer work which she did between the two world wars, in revitalising the teaching of poetry in schools, especially to young children, and in reviving choric speech.

== Mitchell Library Collection of Gullan's scrapbooks, etc ==
The Mitchell Library in Glasgow contains a collection of newspaper cutting scrapbooks of Gullan's, and also includes a dissertation about her, several 78rpm records featuring her, the medal she was awarded and some other items,

Full details, including how to book an appointment to view them, can be found here https://libcat.csglasgow.org/web/arena/gullan

== Bibliography ==
=== Books ===
- Speech Training in the School (1920)
- Spoken Poetry In The Schools (1926)
- Poetry Speaking for Children (with Percival Gurrey; 1932)
- The Speech Choir With American Poetry And English Ballads For Choral Reading (1937)
- A Poetry Speaking Anthology, (eds. Hilda Adams, Anne Croasdell, and Marjorie Gullan; 1938)
- Choral Speaking (1940)
- The Poet Speaks: An Anthology for Choral Speaking (eds. Marjorie Gullan and Clive Sansom; 1940)

=== Articles ===
- "Spoken Poetry in the Schools" in The Musical Times, 1 February 1927
- "Choral Speaking" in The Musical Times, 1 January 1932
- "War time is education time" in Quarterly Journal of Speech, October 1941
