= Mary Molony =

Irish suffragette

Dorothy Moloney
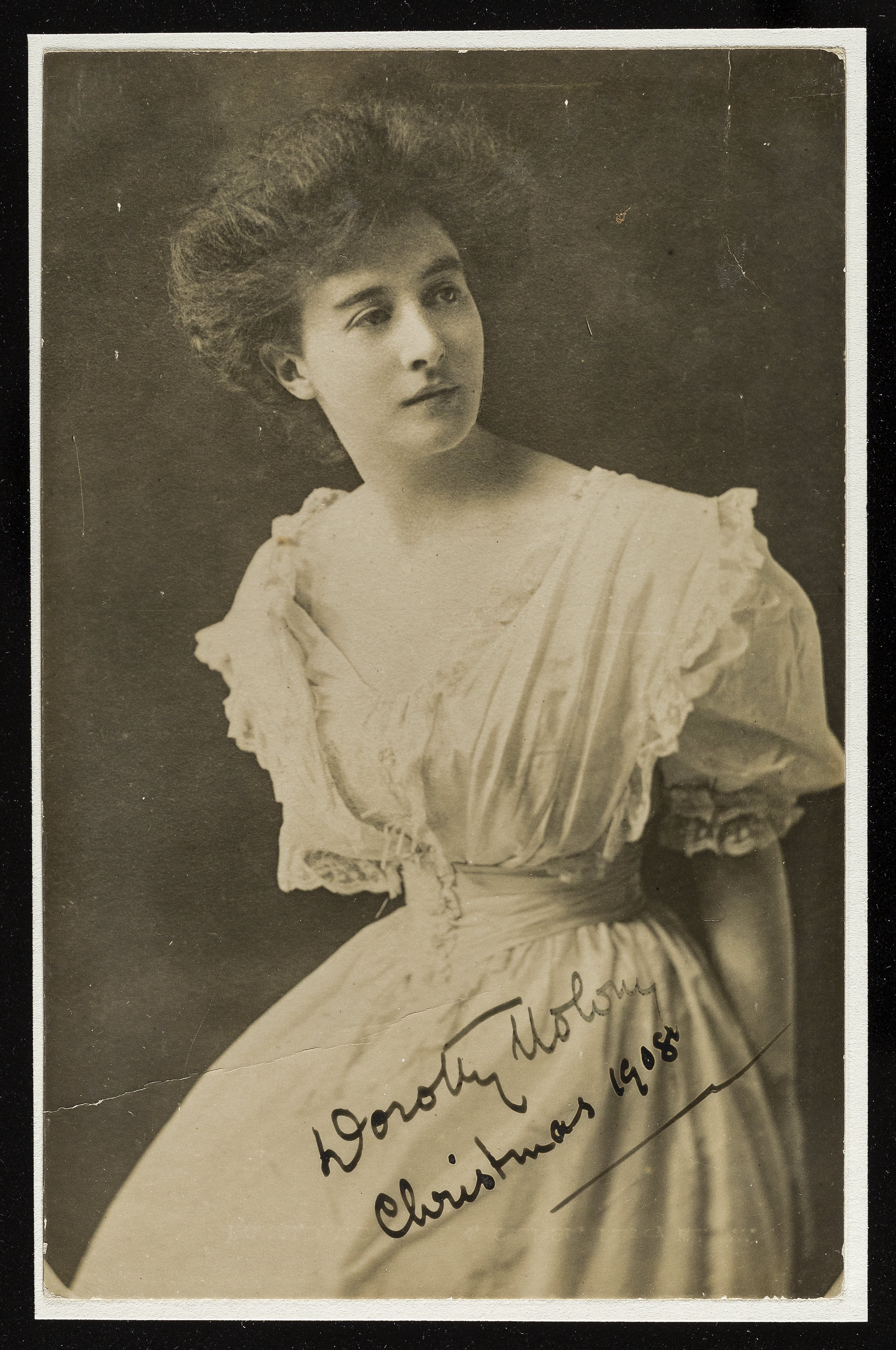
- Born: 29 September 1878; Sandycove, County Dublin, Ireland
- Died: 1 December 1921 (aged 43); Richmond, London, England
- Known for: Suffragette activism

Horatia Dorothy Moloney Lancaster (29 September 1878 – 1 December 1921)(variously known as Dorothy, Mary, Dolly, Miss Maloney and Miss Molony, Moloney and O'Connor) was an Irish suffragette campaigner and member of the Women's Social and Political Union (WSPU). She became Organiser to the London Council of the Women's Freedom League in 1908, following its split from the WSPU. She famously disrupted the 1908 Dundee by-election by ringing a bell every time Winston Churchill attempted to address a crowd, demanding that he apologize for insulting remarks he had made about the women's suffrage movement.

== Early life ==
Moloney was born Horatia Charlotta O'Connor to Edward O'Connor and Henrica Croasdella Moloney in Sandycove, County Dublin on 29 September 1878. Her date of birth is disputed, as some sources give her birth year as 1884 or 1886. The family later moved to Bray, County Wicklow. She moved to London and married Egbert T. Lancaster in 1911.

== 1908 Dundee by-election ==
Dundee experienced a comparatively high amount of suffrage activity in 1908 due to the then prime minister, H.H. Asquith holding the seat for the neighbouring constituency of East Fife and Winston Churchill standing as Liberal MP in Dundee in the 1908 by-election.

The Women's Social and Political Union were active in the campaign with Mary Gawthorpe, Emmeline Pankhurst and Christabel Pankhurst holding meetings in Dundee. However, they were upstaged by the non-violent Women's Freedom League member Dorothy Malony who came up from London for the campaign. Whenever Churchill spoke, Moloney produced and rang a hand bell which drowned out what he was saying. The ding-dong exchanges were taken in fun initially, but some meetings had to be cancelled because of the uproar. The Irish Times newspaper published an account of the by-election on 5 May 1908 that supported claims that Moloney had followed Churchill around for a week.

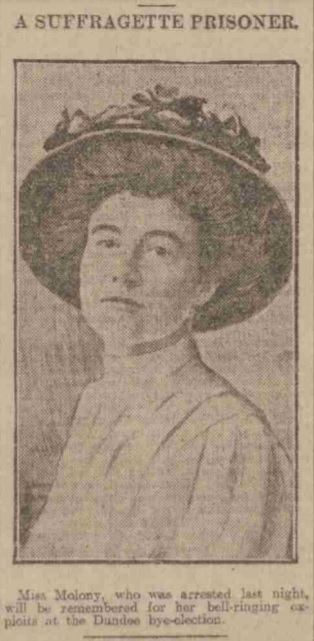
Image from the Dundee Courier, 29 October 1908

"[Maloney] complained of a passage in a speech which the latter delivered on Saturday last, and in which, alluding to the women’s suffrage movement, he said – “I have seen with some regret some most earnest advocates of the cause allying themselves with the forces of drink and reaction. They were carried shoulder-high, I am informed, by the rowdy elements, which are always to be found at a public house-made manifestation.”… Amid great laughter Miss Maloney retorted that if any man attempted to lift her in his arms she would have boxed his ears…

"At the time appointed for him to address the meeting (and when there were about 500 or 600 present), Mr. Churchill drove up in his motor car only to find that the gathering was in full possession of the ladies... who had the sympathy of a goodly majority of the crowd... Mr. Churchill re-entered the vehicle and was about to speak from it when the Suffragette carriage came up, a lady inside loudly ringing a bell. The carriage drew close up to the motor, the bell clanging all the time, and creating so much din...

"The lady said to be Miss Maloney shook her fist at the right hon. gentleman, and exclaimed in a loud voice, “Who is the strongest — an Irish woman or Mr. Winston Churchill?”

While in Scotland, Moloney addressed WFL groups in Dundee and Aberdeenshire. Her by-election protest was widely reported in the press. A bell ringing contest in Aberdeenshire later that year was reported on with the headline "Miss Maloney Overshadowed" and an illustration featuring her.

== Subsequent activity ==
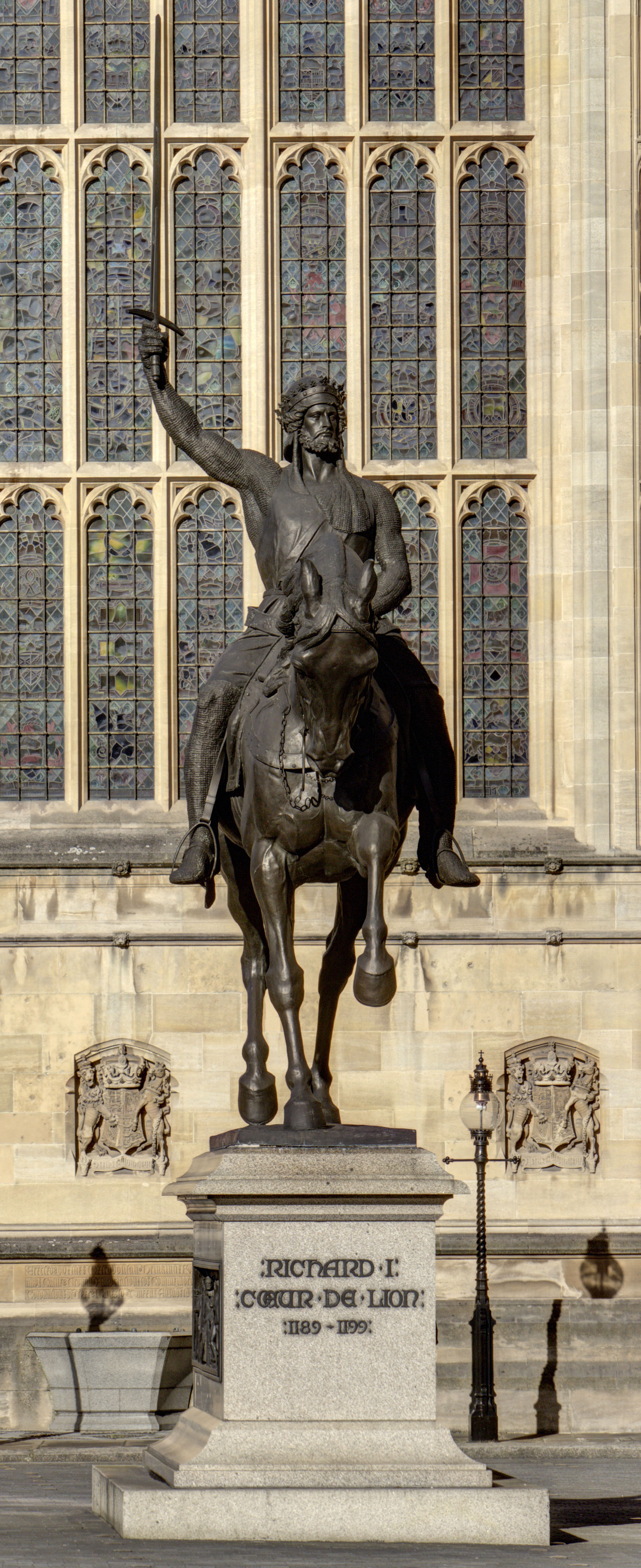
Statue of Richard I, Westminster - front view

On 27 October 1908 she was in London, taking part in a co-ordinated event, organised by the Women's Freedom League. According to a news report, there were a number of actions taking place at the same time. One group of women "and a couple of men" were inside the ladies gallery of the House of Commons, and began to shout, stating, "Mr Speaker, members of the Liberal Government, we have listened behind the grille long enough. The women of England demand the vote." At the same time, a placard was being pushed through the grille in the ladies gallery, which stated, "Women's Freedom League demand votes for women". There was also a group outside, taking part in a demonstration in Old Palace Yard outside the houses of parliament; a newspaper report says "four very athletic suffragettes clambered on a statue", that of the Richard Coeur de Lion) .

She was subsequently arrested, after "refusing to leave the crowd and holding on to the horse's legs" but her fine of £5 was paid by a friend "much to her chagrin".

On 18 June 1910, she took part in a Grand Procession in London, one of the earliest mass marches organised by the suffrage movement. She was among a group of "prisoners" - people who had been sent to prison for the cause. Other groups were graduate, teachers, athletes, musicians and actresses. Many of the groups carried banners.

== Death and legacy ==
Moloney died shortly after giving birth to a son at her home in Richmond, London in 1921. Her obituary appeared in The Vote newspaper: "all the old members of the Women's Freedom League were deeply grieved to hear of the death, after a short illness, of our old comrade, Dolly Malony, the bright and bonny and resourceful little Irish girl, who rang the bell at Mr. Churchill's historic Dundee election, when the women decided he should not be allowed to speak".

She appears on the Roll of Honour of Suffragette Prisoners as Miss Maloney. The moniker "La Belle Maloney", a reference to her bell-ringing exploits, was reported by Sylvia Pankhurst.

A song has been written about her bell-ringing exploits by Glasgow singer/songwriter Lainey Dempsey.
