= Mbhashe Local Municipality =

Mbhashe
- Local municipality
- Seal

- Location in the Eastern Cape
- Coordinates: 32°10′S 28°35′E
- Country: South Africa
- Province: Eastern Cape
- District: Amathole
- Seat: Dutywa
- Wards: 32

Government
  - Type: Municipal council
  - Mayor: Samkelo Nicholas Janda (ANC)
  - Speaker: Babalwa Majavu (ANC)
  - Chief Whip: Mandla Sibingibingi (ANC)

Area
  - Total: 3,169 km^{2} (1,224 sq mi)

Population (2011)
  - Total: 254,909
  - Density: 80.44/km^{2} (208.3/sq mi)

Racial makeup (2011)
  - Black African: 99.4%
  - Coloured: 0.1%
  - Indian/Asian: 0.1%
  - White: 0.2%

First languages (2011)
  - Xhosa: 95.7%
  - English: 1.6%
  - Other: 2.7%
- Time zone: UTC+2 (SAST)
- Municipal code: EC121

Mbhashe Municipality (Xhosa: uMasipala wase Mbhashe) is a local municipality in the Eastern Cape province of South Africa. The municipality was constituted in terms of the Municipal Structures Act of 1998 and comprises the areas that previously formed the Elliotdale, Willowvale and Dutywa town councils. The municipality is located in the north eastern part of the Amathole District Municipality. The main administrative office is situated in Dutywa.

Its primary claim to fame is as the birthplace of former President Thabo Mbeki. The Mbanyana Falls, Mbhashe Cultural Village and Donald Wood's Snooker Room number among its attractions. The word Mbashe is derived from isiXhosa. The municipality is named after the Mbashe River. The area also boasts the head offices of the AmaXhosa Kingdom at the Nqadu Great Place.

== Main places ==
The 2001 census divided the municipality into the following main places:

Place	Code	Area (km^{2})	Population
Bashee	21001	213.82	13,524
Bonkolo	21002	158.19	9,394
Cizela	21003	143.92	8,903
Ebongweni	21004	19.86	1,223
Ebotwe	21005	771.80	49,869
Elliotdale	21006	8.21	1,012
Emvelini	21007	177.44	17,348
Gcaleka-Ngchana	21008	146.50	11,403
Hala	21009	22.36	1,442
Idutywa Part 1	21010	275.97	28,957
Idutywa Part 2	21019	9.19	4,828
Jalamba	21011	277.47	31,914
Kwamkoloza	21012	306.87	18,655
Mpeko	21013	2.14	0
Ngqwangele	21014	105.63	12,998
Ngubezulu	21015	238.10	27,130
Ntonga	21016	101.36	8,466
Ntshatshongo	21017	48.53	3,779
Willowvale	21018	5.54	2,546

== Politics ==
The municipal council consists of sixty-three members elected by mixed-member proportional representation. Thirty-two councillors are elected by first-past-the-post voting in thirty-two wards, while the remaining thirty-one are chosen from party lists so that the total number of party representatives is proportional to the number of votes received.

In the election of 4 November 2026 the African National Congress (ANC) won a reduced majority of thirty-two seats.

The following table shows the results of the election.

Party	Ward			List			Total seats
Party	Votes	%	Seats	Votes	%	Seats	Total seats
African National Congress	30,520	49.97	27	31,072	51.08	5	32
United Democratic Movement	13,034	21.34	2	13,668	22.47	12	14
South African Communist Party	6,187	10.13	2	6,656	10.94	5	7
African Transformation Movement	3,257	5.33	0	3,331	5.48	3	3
Economic Freedom Fighters	2,146	3.51	0	2,208	3.63	2	2
Democratic Alliance	1,421	2.33	0	1,420	2.33	2	2
Independent candidates	2,064	3.38	1				1
African Democrats	796	1.30	0	847	1.39	1	1
Pan Africanist Congress of Azania	441	0.72	0	423	0.70	1	1
7 other parties	1,212	1.98	0	1,205	1.98	0	0
Total	61,078	100.00	32	60,830	100.00	31	63
Valid votes	61,078	97.61		60,830	97.33		
Invalid/blank votes	1,493	2.39		1,666	2.67		
Total votes	62,571	100.00		62,496	100.00		
Registered voters/turnout	133,613	46.83		133,613	46.77		
