= John Henderson Soga =

Xhosa author, minister, historian, translator, ethnographer, and composer

- Born: 1860
- Died: 10 March 1941 (aged 80–81); Southampton, England
- Education: University of Edinburgh
- Occupations: Minister, Historian, Translator, Ethnographer, Composer
- Known for: The South-Eastern Bantu; The Ama-Xhosa: Life and Customs
- Parent: Tiyo Soga (father) Janet Burnside (mother)
- Relatives: William Anderson Soga (brother) Allan Kirkland Soga (brother)

John Henderson Soga (10 February 1860–March 1941) was a prominent Xhosa minister, historian, translator and ethnographer. The second son of the celebrated missionary Tiyo Soga, his elder brother was William Anderson Soga, the first Black medical doctor in South Africa. He became a key intellectual figure in the early 20th century, specifically noted for his efforts to document Xhosa history and customs from an African perspective.

== Early life and education ==
Soga was born in 1860 at the Mgwali Mission in the Eastern Cape. He was the son of Reverend Tiyo Soga, the first ordained Xhosa minister, and his Scottish wife, Janet Burnside. Like his father, he was educated in both South Africa and Scotland.From 1886 to 1890, Soga attended the University of Edinburgh, preparing for the ministry within the United Presbyterian Church.

== Career and literary work ==
Following his ordination, Soga returned to South Africa to engage in missionary and ministerial work. Alongside his religious duties, he pursued extensive literary and scholarly activities. Like his father, he was a prolific composer of Xhosa hymns and translated various works into the Xhosa language.

== Translations ==
Soga was a member of the 1924 committee tasked with the revision of the Xhosa Bible. One of his most significant literary achievements was the 1927 publication of his translation of the second part of John Bunyan’s Pilgrim’s Progress (U-Hambo lo-Mhambi). His father, Tiyo Soga, had translated the first part in 1867, but his early death had prevented him from completing the project. Soga also translated practical texts regarding health and travel for the benefit of Xhosa readers.

== Selected works ==
Soga's most widely recognized academic contributions are his detailed histories and ethnographies. These works remain primary sources for the study of the Eastern Cape's history:

- The South-Eastern Bantu (1930): A comprehensive history of the migrations and genealogies of the Bantu-speaking peoples.
- The Ama-Xhosa: Life and Customs (1931): A foundational ethnographic study of Xhosa social structures and traditions.

== Death ==
Soga retired to Southampton, England, in 1936. He was killed during a German air raid in March 1941, along with his wife and son.

== Bibliography ==
- Soga, J. H. (1930). The South-Eastern Bantu (Abe-Nguni, Aba-Mbo, Ama-Lala).
- Johannesburg: Witwatersrand University Press. Soga, J. H. (1931).
- The Ama-Xhosa: Life and Customs. Lovedale: Lovedale Press. Peires, J. B. (1982).
- The House of Phalo: A History of the Xhosa People in the Days of Their Independence. University of California Press

== See also ==
- Xhosa people
- Tiyo Soga
