= Dutywa =

Dutywa Idutywa
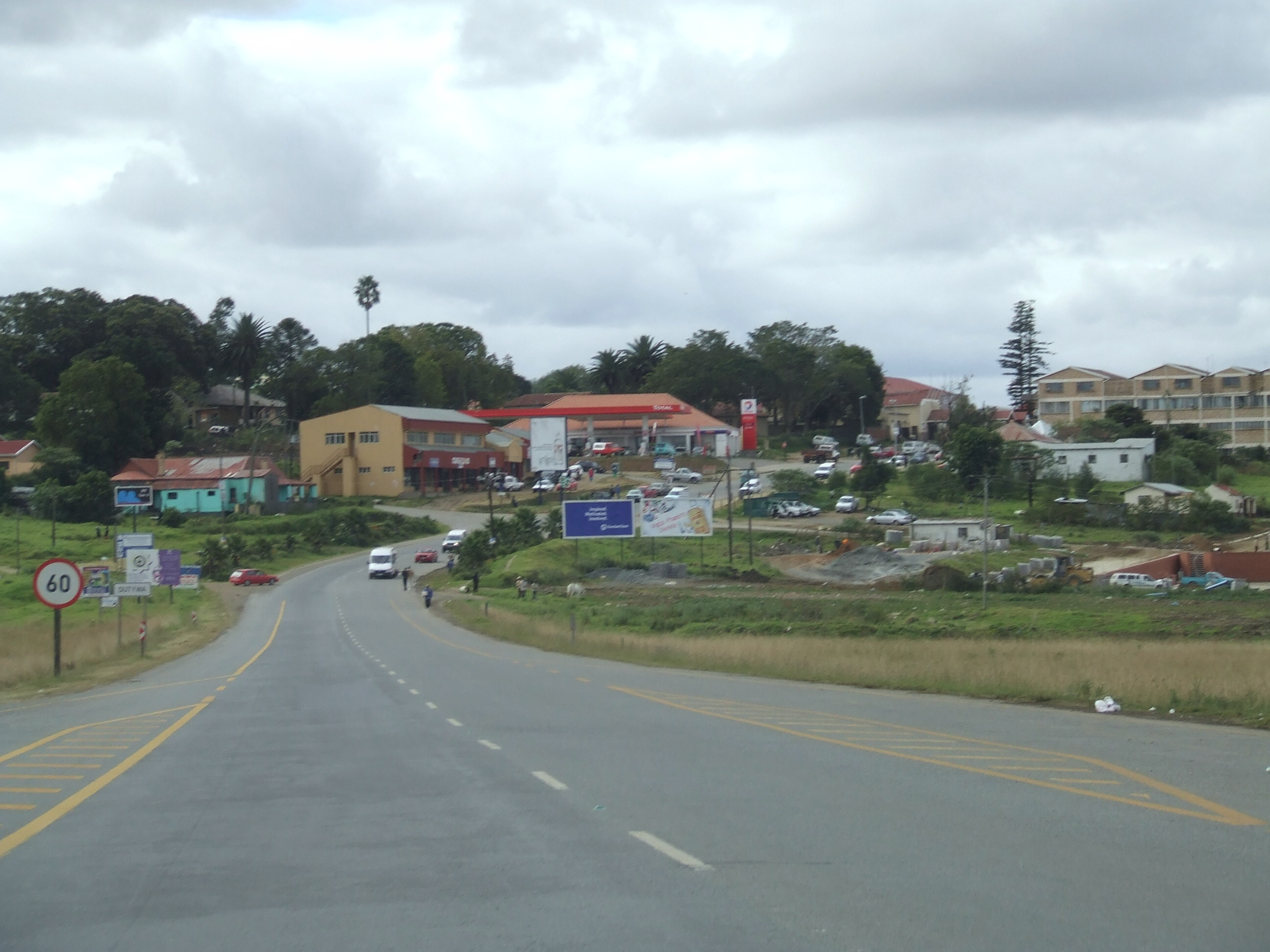
- The N2 about to enter Idutywa

- Location within Eastern Cape Location within South Africa Location within Africa
- Coordinates: 32°06′S 28°18′E
- Country: South Africa
- Province: Eastern Cape
- District: Amathole
- Municipality: Mbhashe
- Established: 1858

Area
  - Total: 20.83 km^{2} (8.04 sq mi)

Population (2011)
  - Total: 11,076
  - Density: 531.7/km^{2} (1,377/sq mi)

Racial makeup (2011)
  - Black African: 96.6%
  - Coloured: 1.3%
  - Indian/Asian: 0.7%
  - White: 1.1%
  - Other: 0.4%

First languages (2011)
  - Xhosa: 91.6%
  - English: 3.3%
  - Other: 5.1%
- Time zone: UTC+2 (SAST)
- Postal code (street): 5000
- PO box: 5000
- Area code: 047

Dutywa, also known as Idutywa, is a town in Mbashe Local Municipality, Eastern Cape province, South Africa, that was founded in 1858 as a military fort after a dispute between a Natal Colony raiding party and its local people. It is named after the Dutywa River, a tributary of the Mbhashe River. The name means "place of disorder" in the Xhosa language; its spelling was officially changed from "Idutywa" to "Dutywa" on 16 July 2004. The settlement was laid out in 1884 and was made a municipality in 1913. The town is the birthplace of former South African President, Thabo Mbeki.

Dutywa is home to 11,076 people, 96.6% of who are Black African (Xhosa).

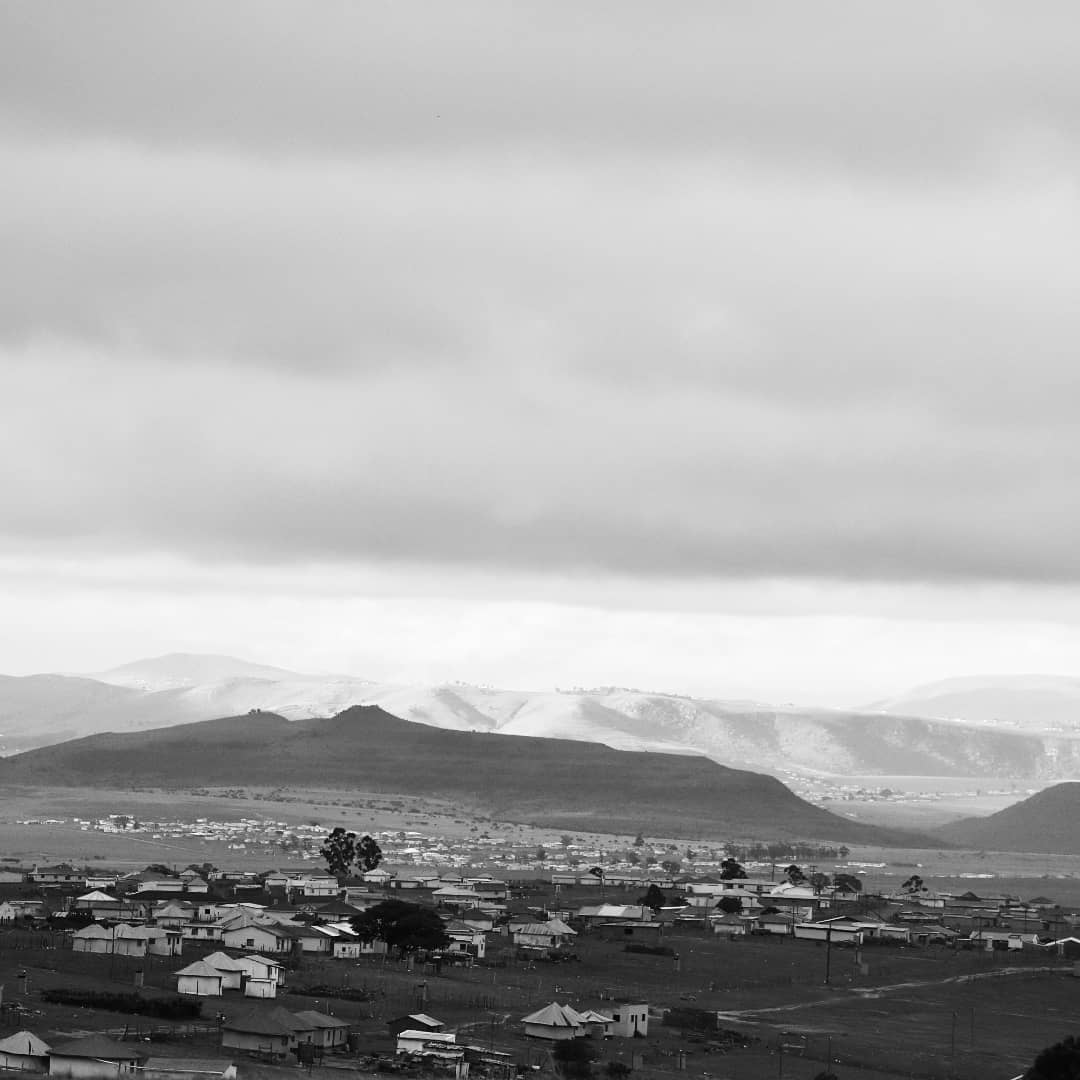
Bolotwa Location

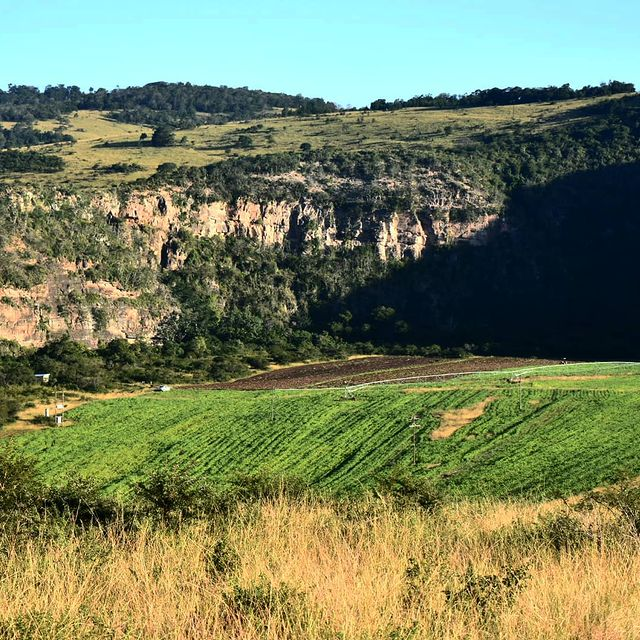
Farming by Anda Zaku

Employment by Industry
Sector	Workers	% of labour force
Agriculture	402	0.3%
Mining / Quarrying	103	0.1%
Manufacturing	593	0.5%
Electricity / Gas / Water supply	593	0.5%
Construction	448	0.4%
Wholesale / Retail trade	2,146	1.7%
Transport / Storage / Communication	206	0.2%
Financial / Insurance / Real estate	1,174	0.5%
Community / Social / Personal services	2,843	2.3%
Private households / Other	11,874	4.6%

Population by Monthly Income (incl Social Grants)
Income (R)	People	% of population
R 204,801–	0	0.0%
R 102,401–204,800	124	0.0%
R 51,201–102,400	0	0.0%
R 25,601–51,200	170	0.1%
R 12,801–25,600	408	0.2%
R 6,401–12,800	2,768	1.1%
R 3,201–6,400	3,478	1.4%
R 1,601–3,200	3,867	1.5%
R 801–1,600	32,606	12.7%
R 401–800	15,222	6.0%
R 1–400	27,084	10.6%
No income	166,165	64.9%
