= Mbhashe River =

River in the Eastern Cape, South Africa

Mbhashe River Mbashe, Bashee
- Location of the Mbashe River mouth
- Etymology: Referring either to 'dark river' or 'dangerous ravine' in the Xhosa language, or perhaps named after a person called 'Mbashe'

Location
- Country: South Africa
- Province: Eastern Cape Province

Physical characteristics
- Source: Drakensberg
  - location: NE of Elliot, Eastern Cape
  - elevation: 1,700 m (5,600 ft)
- Mouth: Indian Ocean
  - location: Bashee
  - coordinates: 32°15′S 28°54′E
  - elevation: 0 m (0 ft)
- Basin size: 6,030 km^{2} (2,330 sq mi)

Mbhashe River is one of the major rivers in the Eastern Cape Province, South Africa. It flows in a southeastern direction and has a catchment area of 6,030 km^{2} (2330 sq. mi.). The river drains into the Indian Ocean through an estuary located near the lighthouse at Bashee, south of Mhlanganisweni.

After passing under national road N2, the Mbhashe River encounters southwest of Elliotdale and north-east of Dutywa the more rugged terrain of the Wild Coast and suddenly enters into a 64 km (40 mile) long series of violent twists and turns known as the Collywobbles before continuing more sedately towards the Indian Ocean.

The Mbhashe river's main tributaries are the Xuka River, Mgwali River, Dutywa River and the Mnyolo River. Presently this river is part of the Mzimvubu to Keiskamma Water Management Area.

== History ==
In 1554 Portuguese ship São Bento ran aground at the mouth of the Mbhashe River. The ordeal of 322 of its survivors, who walked from there to Lourenço Marques, presently Maputo, has been recorded.

Mvezo is a village on the banks of the Mbhashe River, where Nelson Mandela was born in 1918.

On the 5 February 1963 a white family was killed by members of the Azanian People's Liberation Army, the armed wing of the Pan Africanist Congress while camping near a bridge close to the river. 40 men were arrested and 23 were later sentenced to death for the murder.

== Ecology ==
Some of the fishes caught in its waters are Labeobarbus aeneus, Barbus pallidus, Barbus anoplus, Myxus capensis, Anguilla marmorata and Anguilla mossambica. Labeobarbus aeneus is an invasive species, now widely present in the river system.

== See also ==
- List of rivers of South Africa
- List of estuaries of South Africa
