= Elliotdale =

Elliotdale Bomvana Xhora
- Location within Eastern Cape Location within South Africa
- Coordinates: 31.966667°S 28.683333°E
- Country: South Africa
- Province: Eastern Cape
- District: Amathole
- Municipality: Mbhashe

Area
  - Total: 7.15 km^{2} (2.76 sq mi)

Population (2011)
  - Total: 2,267
  - Density: 317/km^{2} (821/sq mi)

Racial makeup (2011)
  - Black African: 93.8%
  - Coloured: 1.3%
  - Indian/Asian: 0.8%
  - White: 0.7%
  - Other: 3.4%

First languages (2011)
  - Xhosa: 93.5%
  - English: 2.0%
  - Other: 4.6%
- Time zone: UTC+2 (SAST)
- Postal code (street): 5070
- PO box: 5070
- Area code: 047

Elliotdale (Xhosa: Xhora) is a town in Amatole District Municipality in the Eastern Cape province of South Africa.

The town lies 50 km south of Mthatha and 22 km south-east of Mqanduli. It is named after Sir Henry Elliot, Chief Magistrate of the Transkei from 1891 to 1902.
