= Battle of Amalinde =

The Battle of Amalinda was an armed confrontation between two Xhosa chiefs of the Rharhabe House, which took place in October 1818 just outside of what is today King Williams Town, in the Eastern Cape region of South Africa. On the eve of the fifth Xhosa War Chief Ngqika had close ties with the British, while his uncle, Chief Ndlambe, had no such agreements and painted Ngqika as someone selling out his people in return for personal gain. Chief Ndlambe was assisted in the battle by the senior, King Hintsa and his Gcaleka warriors. When chief Ngqika was defeated in the battle, he retreated and appealed to the British for protection. A British-led force commanded by Colonel Thomas Brereton then seized 23,000 head of cattle from Ndlambe's people in retaliation, leading to the battle of Grahamstown.

== Background and causes ==
The two contending AmaXhosa chiefs of the Rharhabe House were Chief Ngqika and his paternal uncle, Chief Ndlambe.

Ngqika's father, Mlawu, died when Ngqika was too young to rule and therefore his uncle Ndlambe, as per custom, became the regent. Under Ndlambe's leadership, the chieftaincy grew in strength as he consolidated his power by absorbing smaller chiefdoms or expelling them to far afield lands. It was in 1795 when Ngqika had entered manhood that he soon demanded his rightful place as regent and leader of the AmaRharhabe. Ndlambe refused to relinquish power and because of this stalemate, a minor civil battle ensued. The two adversaries co-existed for almost two decades, in a state of immense tensions.

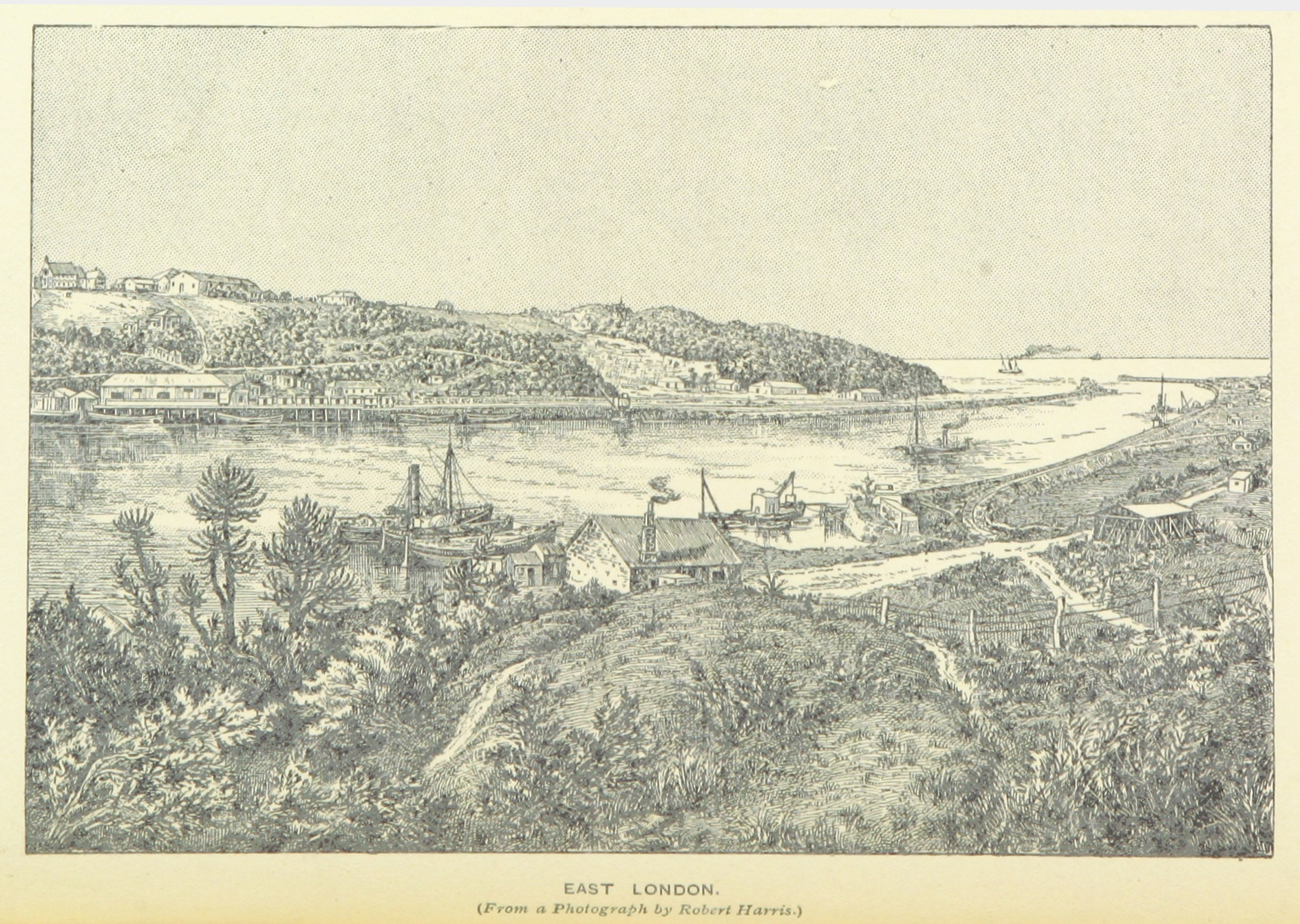
An etching of the British settlement of nearby East London as it would have looked a few years after the battle took place.

On the personal side, Ngqika fell deeply in love with a young Thuthula, the beautiful daughter of Dibi and, more significantly, wife of his elderly uncle Ndlambe. This incestuous situation was a lesser but direct cause of the Battle of Amalinda. A more substantial cause of the battle was Ngqika's meeting in 1817 with Lord Charles Somerset, Governor of the Cape, when he was forced to give up both the Great Fish River and Keiskamma River. The Amaxhosa felt aggrieved, that since Ngqika was not the paramount chief, he could not then authorise the alienation of the land. Ndlambe then reported the matter to King Hintsa, it is said that Hintsa was incensed by Ngqika's actions. In the earlier years, when Hintsa was still a boy, Ngqika had kidnapped him during some minor civil war between Ngqika's followers and amaGcaleka. So in 1819, when Ndlambe reported to Hintsa that Ngqika was working with the Europeans to grow his power against other Xhosa chiefs across the kei. Ndlambe also reported that his wife Thuthula had been taken by Ngqika as his. Hintsa took it to himself to go and "Put Ngqika in his place" and so Hintsa crossed the kei with amaGcaleka to meet up with amaNdlambe headed by Ndlambe, amaGqunukhwebe headed by Kama, amaNtinde headed by Tshatshu, amaGwali headed by Nginza and amaGwali headed by Mhade. All these armies met together at Debe near King William's Town to go punish Ngqika.

Ndlambe's son Mdushane commanded the army, while Ngqika's army was commanded by his son Maqoma (Jongumsobomvu). At 21-years old, this was Maqoma's first taste of battle.

== The battle ==
The conflict of October 1818 was consequently the result of the longstanding rivalry between the two chiefs, stemming from both personal and socio-political disagreements. The clash lasted from midday to nightfall, and occurred at Amalinde, the isiXhosa name for the Debe Hollows of Kommetjie, 19 kilometres west of King Williams Town, in what is today a part of East London, Eastern Cape. The exact site of the battle remains uncertain, however.

=== Ngqika’s strategy ===
Most sources reveal that Ngqika and his men went forth towards the Debe, known in isiXhosa as indebe meaning pockmark. He followed a route that skirted the foothills of the Amathole region, the route that is today followed by the roads and railway. Having travelled for over 45 kilometres that morning, Ngqika and his men arrived only at noon. It is said that Ngqika watched the battle from the hillside, some believing that possibly even on the foothills of the Ntaba kaNdoda area that flanks the Debe River valley to the north. Sources report that Ngqika himself was neither a great fighter nor military strategist. As such, he appointed his eldest son Maqoma, who had no actual battle experience, together with Jingqi, a renowned fighter, as lead forces in the battle against Ndlambe. In October 1818, Ngqika mobilised his warriors and sent for help from the British Cape Colony. Ngqika and his men sought advice from Ntsikana, the royal diviner and spiritual counsellor, in his quest to destroy the Ndlambe Great Place. Ntsikana first offered his visionary services to Ndlambe, who then rejected them since he was already served by Nxele, prompting Ntsikana to find his spiritual home under the trusteeship of Ngqika. As with the other charismatic millenarian prophet Nxele, who was in service to Ndlambe, Ntsikana came under the influence of the missioner, Johannes van der Kemp, stationed at Bethelsdorp near Port Elizabeth.

=== Ndlambe’s strategy ===
Ndlambe had the advantage of distance and did, in fact, use it wisely. Having to travel a much shorter distance to the battle site as compared to Ngqika, Ndlambe's great place was at Mount Coke, only 25 kilometres away from the Debe, it is probable that he selected an area which held the greater advantage for him and his men. For this, he and his men had to first cross a large area covered by the Amalinde, proving true that indeed it was the battle of Amalinde. Ndlambe's army was led by his son, Mdushane and further supported by the Gcaleka warriors who were led personally into the battlefield by the Great King Hintsa, who was his cousin. Another important figure in Ndlambe had in his camp was the other charismatic millenarian prophet Nxele, otherwise known as Makana. Proclaiming himself to be the son of God, Nxele offered to Ndlambe and his men a way of thinking which provided them with some understanding of and resistance to the pressures being exerted by the encroaching whites. Ndlambe also made use of Nxele's growing influence in his power struggle with Ngqika.

== Outcome ==
Wounded and facing defeat, Ngqika's remaining men, as led by his eldest son Maqoma, fled up to the slopes of Ntaba ka Ndoda. It is reported that over 500 men lost their lives on that fateful day in October 1818. As the sun went down on that same day, Mdushane's men fueled huge bonfires with the lifeless bodies of Ngqika's men, leaving behind very little of what used to be people. In the final analysis, there was no real victor between the amaNgqika and the amaNdlambe as the consequences for both were profound. Soon after the battle, Ngqika appealed to the British for assistance and in December 1818, a military expedition under the leadership of Colonel Thomas Brereton set out to engage Ndlambe. Hintsa had crossed the Kei backhome with his Gcaleka force, So Ndlambe had to face the British expeditionary force without allies. He dispatched messengers to the British force claiming that he had no hostile intentions towards them, though these were ignored. The British force soon encountered his force and routed it after a short battle, capturing numerous heads of cattle. Nxele then attacked Grahamstown to retrieve some of the cattle, but the attack was unsuccessful, and Nxele was captured and sent to jail in Robben Island, where he drowned trying to escape.

== See also ==
- Keiskammahoek
- ImiDushane
