= Bantu peoples of South Africa =

Ethnic descriptor

Africans of the South/Black South Africans
- South African flagged, geographic map pertaining to South Africa

Total population
- ▲50,486,856 (2022 census) ▲81.45% of South Africa's population

Languages
- Afrikaans; English; Northern Sotho; Southern Ndebele; Southern Sotho; Swazi; Tsonga; Tswana; Venda; Xhosa; Zulu

Religion
- Christianity; Irreligious; Traditional African religions; Undetermined; Further information: Religion in South Africa

Related ethnic groups
- Other Indigenous Southern Africans; Relating Coloureds; Relating South African diaspora

Bantu-speaking people of South Africa are the majority, ethno-linguistic people of South Africa. They are indigenous southern Africans from Southern Bantu-speaking peoples; whose earliest presence through surviving evidence, in the now "South Africa", is noted between 350 BCE and 300 CE from either the speculated prehistoric migrations called Bantu expansion (5000 BCE to 500 CE), or due to localized back and forth seasonal migratory culture(s) based on shifting cultivation. They are referred to in various census as African, Black, or Native South African.

== History ==
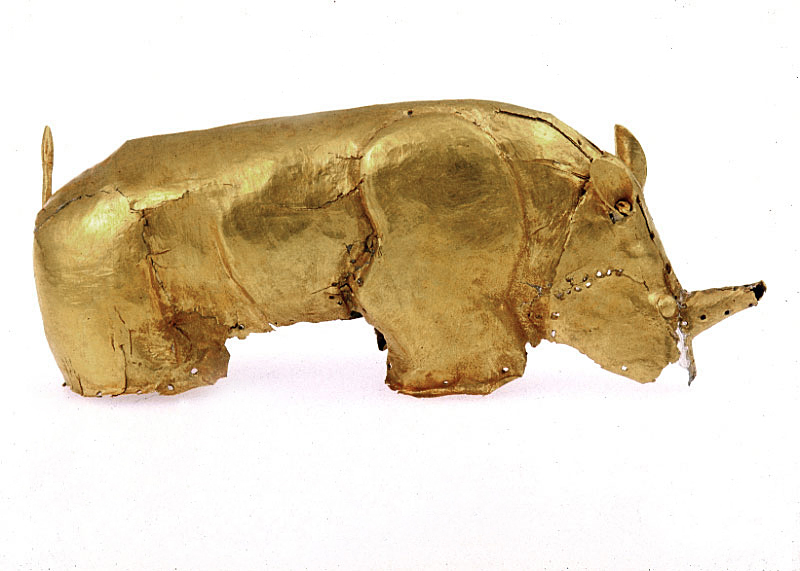
The Mapungubwe rhinoceros of the Mapungubwe Collection dated c. 1250–1290

=== Early history ===
Archaeological evidence suggests that Homo sapiens inhabited the region for over 100,000 years, with agriculture occurring since at least 100 CE. With the Bantu expansion (~1500 BCE), the latitudinal movement of original Bantu-speaking groups from west-central Africa brought some advancements with them, such as iron-worked tools and pottery unique to them. With the expansion, the language of the Bantu people spread throughout southern and central Africa, which evolved into the many languages spoken in the area today. Based on prehistorical archaeological evidence of pastoralism and farming in southern Africa, the findings in sites located in the southernmost region of modern Mozambique, that are dated 354–68 BCE, are some of the oldest and most proximate ancient findings of archaeological evidence related to the South African Bantu-speaking peoples in the south African region. Ancient settlements remains found thus far similarly based on pastoralism and farming within South Africa were dated 249–370 CE.

Around 1220, the Kingdom of Mapungubwe formed in the Shashe-Limpopo Basin, with rainmaking crucial to the development of sacral kingship. Venda tradition holds the two kings were called Shiriyadenga and Tshidziwelele. Mapungubwe collapsed around 1300 for unknown reasons, although shifting trade routes north to Great Zimbabwe likely contributed to its demise. The population dispersed, and didn't regroup.

=== Polity history and interactions with Europeans ===
When the early Portuguese sailors Vasco Da Gama and Bartholomew Dias reached the Cape of Good Hope in the late 15th century CE, a number of Khoe language speakers were found living there and the indigenous population around the Cape primarily consisted of Khoisan groups. Following the establishment of the Dutch Cape Colony, European settlers began arriving in Southern Africa in substantial numbers. Around the 1770s, Trekboers from the Cape encountered more Bantu language speakers towards the Great Fish River and frictions eventually arose between the two groups. In the late 18th and early 19th centuries, there were two major areas of frictional contact between the white colonialists and the Bantu language speakers in Southern Africa. Firstly, as the Boers moved north inland from the Cape they encountered Xhosa, Basotho, and Tswana peoples. Secondly attempts at coastal settlement was made by the British in two regions now known as the Eastern Cape and KwaZulu-Natal.

==== "Empty Land" myth ====
The history of the Bantu-speaking peoples from South Africa has in the past been misunderstood due to the deliberate spreading of false narratives such as The Empty Land Myth. First published by W.A. Holden in the 1860s, this doctrine claims that South Africa had mostly been an unsettled region and that Bantu-speaking peoples had begun to migrate southwards from present day Zimbabwe at the same time as the Europeans had begun to move northwards from the Cape settlement, despite there being no historical or archaeological evidence to support this theory.

This theory originated in Southern Africa during the period of Colonisation of Africa, historians have noted that this theory had already gained currency among Europeans by the mid-1840s. Its later alternative form of note were conformed around the "1830s concept of Mfecane", trying to hide and ignore the intrusion of Europeans on Bantu lands, by implying that the territory they colonized was devoid of human habitation (as a result of the Mfecane). Modern research has disputed this historiographical narrative. By the 1860s, when Holden was propagating his theory, this turbulent period had resulted in large swathes of South African land falling under the control of either the Boer Republics or British colonials, there was denaturalisation accompanied with forced displacement and population transfer of these indigenous peoples from their land, the myth being used as the justification for the capture and settlement of Bantu-speaking peoples's land. The Union of South Africa established rural reserves in 1913 and 1936, by legislating the reduction and voiding of South African Bantu-speaking peoples's land heritage holistically, thereby land relating to Bantu-speaking peoples of South Africa legislatively became reduced into being those reserves. In this context, the Natives Land Act, 1913, limited Black South Africans to 7% of the land in the country. In 1936, through the Native Trust and Land Act, 1936, Union of South Africa's government planned to raise this to 13.6% but subsequently would not.

The National Party (South Africa) government, the Apartheid government became the profundity action from the pre-1948 Union of South Africa's government rule, it introduced a series of measures that reshaped the South African society such that Europeans would take themselves as the demographic majority while being a minority group. The creation of false homelands or Bantustans (based on dividing South African Bantu language speaking peoples by ethnicity) was a central element of this strategy, the Bantustans were eventually made nominally independent, in order to limit South African Bantu language speaking peoples citizenship to those Bantustans. The Bantustans were meant to reflect an analogy of the various ethnic "-stans" of Western and Central Asia such as the Kafiristan, Pakistan, etc. But in South Africa, the association with Apartheid discredited the term, and the Apartheid government shifted to the politically appealing but historically deceptive term "ethnic homelands". Meanwhile, the Anti-Apartheid Movement persisted in calling the areas Bantustans, to actively protest the Apartheid governments' political illegitimacy. The fallacy of The Empty Land Myth also completely omits the existence of the Saan (hunter-gatherers) and the Khoikhoi (pastoralists) in southern Africans, who roamed much of the southwestern region of Africa for millenniums before the invasions, colonialism of Europeans.

==== Cape Frontier Wars ====
The longest running military action from the period of colonialism in Africa, which saw a series of nine wars during 1779 till 1879. Involving the Xhosa Kingdom and the British Empire, mainly in the present day South African region of Eastern Cape.

(1779–1803): After European invasion of the present day Western Cape, South Africa region, colonialist's frontiersmen in the 18th century started encroaching the land farther inland present-day South African region, encountering more of the indigenous population, conflict of land and cattle grew sparking the first war that set to drive Xhosa people out of Zuurveld by 1781. The second war involved a larger Xhosa territory between the Great Fish River and the Sundays River, the Gqunukhwebe clans of the Xhosa started to penetrate back into the Zuurveld and colonists under Barend Lindeque, allied themselves with Ndlambe, a regent of the Western Xhosas, to repel the Gqunukhwebe. The second war concluded when farms were abandoned due to panic in 1793. In 1799 the third war began with the Xhosa rebellion – discontented Khoekhoe revolted and joined with the Xhosa in the Zuurveld, and started retaking land through farms occupied by colonialist, reaching Oudtshoorn by July 1799. The colonial officials made peace with the Xhosa and Khoe in Zuurveld. In 1801, Graaff-Reinet rebellion started forcing more Khoekhoe desertions and farm abandonment. The commandos could not achieve any result, so in February 1803 a peace was arranged with the Xhosas and Khoekhoes.

(1811–1819): Zuurveld became a buffer zone between the Cape Colony and Xhosa territory, empty of the Boers, the British to the west and the Xhosa to the east. In 1811 the fourth war began when the Xhosa took back the rest of their territory of Zuurveld, conflicts with the settlers followed. Forces under Colonel John Graham drove the Xhosa back beyond the Fish River. The fifth war, the war of Nxele, started after the Battle of Amalinde. This happened after a civil war broke out within the Xhosa Nation when the British-allied chief Ngqika of the Right Hand House allegedly tried to overthrow the Government and become the king of the Xhosas but was defeated. Then Ngqika appealed to the British who seized 23,000 head of cattle from a Xhosa chief. The Xhosa prophet, Nxele (Makhanda) emerged, under the command of Mdushane, Ndlambe's son, led 6,000 Xhosa force attack on 22 April 1819 to Grahamstown, which was held by 350 troops repulsed Nxele. Nxele was captured and imprisoned on Robben Island. The British pushed the Xhosa further east beyond the Fish River to the Keiskamma River. The resulting empty territory was designated as a buffer zone for loyal Africans' settlements. It came to be known as the "Ceded Territories".

(1834–1879): The Xhosa remained expelled from their territory dubbed "Ceded Territories", that was then settled by Europeans and other African peoples. They were also subjected to territorial expansions from other Africans that were themselves under pressure from the expanding Zulu Kingdom. Nevertheless, the frontier region was seeing increasing amounts of multi-racial issues because Africans and Europeans living and trading throughout the frontier region. The indecision by the Cape Government's policy towards the return of the Xhosa territories did not dissipate Xhosa frustration toward the inability to provide for themselves, hence the Xhosa resorted to frontier cattle-raiding. In response on 11 December 1834, a Cape government commando party killed a chief of high rank, incensing the Xhosa army of 10,000 led by Maqoma, that swept across the frontier into the Cape Colony. A string of defeats by Sir Benjamin d'Urban combining forces under Colonel Sir Harry Smith stopped the Xhosa, most Xhosa chiefs surrendered but the primary leadership Maqoma and Tyali retreated, a treaty was imposed and hostilities finally died down on 17 September 1836. Aftermath the sixth war, a chief believed to be actually the paramount chief or the King of the Gcaleka Xhosa by the Cape Colony, Chief Hintsa ka Khawuta, was shot and killed by George Southey, brother of Richard Southey. The era also saw the rise and fall of Stockenström's treaty system.

The seventh war became a war between the imperial British troops collaborating with the mixed-race "Burgher forces", which were mainly Khoi, Fengu, British settlers and Boer commandos, against the Ngcika assisted by the Ndlambe and Thembu. Tension had been simmering between colonialist farmers and Xhosa raiders, on both sides of the frontier since the dismantlement of Stockenstrom's treaty system. This began when Governor Maitland imposed a new system of treaties on the chiefs without consulting them, while a severe drought forced desperate Xhosa to engage in cattle raids across the frontier to survive. In addition, politician Robert Godlonton continued to use his newspaper the Graham's Town Journal to agitate for 1820 Settlers to annex and settle the land that had been returned to the Xhosa after the previous war. The war concluded after the announcement of the annexation of the country between the Keiskamma and the Kei rivers to the British crown by order of Lord Glenelg. It was not, however, incorporated with the Cape Colony, but made a crown dependency under the name of British Kaffraria Colony with King William's Town as its capital.

Large numbers of Xhosa were displaced across the Keiskamma by Governor Harry Smith, and these refugees supplemented the original inhabitants there, causing overpopulation and hardship. Those Xhosa who remained in the colony were moved to towns and encouraged to adopt European lifestyles. In June 1850 there followed an unusually cold winter, together with an extreme drought. It was at this time that Smith ordered the displacement of large numbers of Xhosa squatters from the Kat River region. The war became known as "Mlanjeni's War", the eighth war, after the prophet Mlanjeni who arose among the homeless Xhosa and preached mobilization, large numbers of Xhosa began leaving the colony's towns and mobilizing in the tribal areas. In February 1852, the British Government decided that Sir Harry Smith's inept rule had been responsible for much of the violence, and ordered him replaced by George Cathcart, who took charge in March. In February 1853 Xhosa chiefs surrendered, the 8th frontier war was the most bitter and brutal in the series of Xhosa wars. It lasted over two years and ended in subjugation of the Ciskei Xhosa.

The cattle-killing movement that began in 1856 to 1858, led Xhosa people to destroy their own means of subsistence in the belief that it would bring about salvation from colonialism through supernatural spirits. First declared by a prophetess Nongqawuse no one believed in the prophecy and it was considered absurdity, but more and more people started believing Nongqawuse. The cult grew and built up momentum, sweeping across the eastern Cape. The return of the ancestors was predicted to occur on 18 February 1857, when the day came, the Xhosa nation waited en masse for the momentous events to occur, only to be bitterly disappointed. Famine set in and disease was also spread from the cattle killings, this forced the remainder of the Xhosa nation to seek relief from colonialists.

In 1877 the ninth of the Cape frontier war happened, known as the "Fengu-Gcaleka War", and also the "Ngcayechibi's War" — the name stemming from a headman whose feast was where the initial fight occurred that traces from the conflicts of this war.

==== Creation of the Zulu Kingdom ====
Before the early 19th century the indigenous population composition in KwaZulu-Natal region was primarily by many different, largely Nguni-speaking clans and influenced by the two powers of the Mthethwa and the Ndwandwe. In 1816, Shaka acceded to the Zulu throne (at that stage the Zulu was merely one of the many clans). Within a relatively short period of time he had conquered his neighbouring clans and had forged the Zulu into the most important ally of the large Mthethwa clan, which was in competition with the Ndwandwe clan for domination of the northern part of modern-day KwaZulu-Natal.

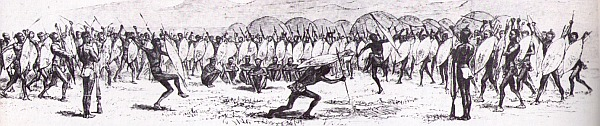
Depicted muster and dance performance of Zulu regiments, c. 1827

After the death of the Mthethwa king Dingiswayo around 1818, at the hands of Zwide, the king of the Ndwandwe, Shaka assumed leadership of the entire Mthethwa alliance. The alliance under his leadership survived Zwide's first assault at the Battle of Gqokli Hill. Within two years he had defeated Zwide at the Battle of Mhlatuze River and broken up the Ndwandwe alliance, some of whom in turn began a murderous campaign against other Nguni communities, resulting in a mass migration of communities fleeing those who are regarded now as Zulu people too. Historians have postulated this as the cause of the Mfecane, a period of mass migration and war in the Southern African interior in the 19th, however this hypothesis is no longer accepted by most historians, and the idea itself of Mfecane/Difaqane has been thoroughly disputed by many scholars, notably by Julian Cobbing.

==== Pedi Kingdom ====
The Pedi polity under King Thulare (c. 1780–1820) was made up of land that stretched from present-day Rustenburg to the lowveld in the west and as far south as the Vaal River. Pedi power was undermined during the Mfecane, by the Ndwandwe. A period of dislocation followed, after which the polity was re-stabilised under Thulare's son Sekwati.

Sekwati succeeded King Thulare as paramount chief of the Bapedi in the northern Transvaal (Limpopo). He engaged in maintaining his domain from other indigenous polities, mostly in frequent conflict with Mzilikazi's army who then had established and residing in Mhlahlandlela (present day Centurion, Gauteng) after retreating King Sigidi kaSenzagakhona's forces, before they moved on to found the Kingdom of Mthwakazi, the Northern Ndebele Kingdom.

Sekwati was also engaged in struggles over land and labour with the invading colonialists. These disputes over land started in 1845 after the arrival of Boers and their declaring of Ohrigstad in King Sekwati's domain, in 1857 the town was incorporated into the Transvaal Republic and the Republic of Lydenburg was formed, an agreement was reached that the Steelpoort River was the border between the Pedi and the Republic. The Pedi were well equipped for waging war though, as Sekwati and his heir, Sekhukhune I were able to procure firearms, mostly through migrant labour from the Kimberley diamond fields and as far as Port Elizabeth. On 16 May 1876, Thomas François Burgers, president of the South African Republic (ZAR), not to be confused with the modern-day Republic of South Africa, caused the First of the Sekhukhune Wars when he declared war against the Bapedi Kingdom, the Burgers' army was defeated on 1 August 1876. The Burgers' government later hired the Lydenburg Volunteer Corps commanded by a German mercenary Conrad von Schlickmann, they were repelled and Conrad was killed in later battles.

On 16 February 1877, the two parties, mediated by Alexander Merensky, signed a peace treaty at Botshabelo. This led to the British annexation of the South African Republic (ZAR) on 12 April 1877 by Sir Theophilus Shepstone, a secretary for native affairs of Natal at that time. The Second of Sekhukhune Wars commenced in 1878 and 1879 with three British attacks that were successfully repelled but Sekhukhune was defeated in November 1879 by Sir Garnet Wolseley's army of twelve thousand, made up of the 2,000 British, Boers and 10,000 Swazis, Swazis joined the war in support of Mampuru II's claim to the Bopedi (Pedi Kingdom) throne. This brought about the Pretoria Convention of 3 August 1881, which stipulated Sekhukhune's release on reasons that his capital was already burned to the ground. Sekhukhune I was murdered by assassination on alleged orders from his half brother Mampuru II due to the existing dispute to the throne, as Mampuru II had been ousted by Sekhukhune before being reinstalled as King of Bopedi by the British after the British invasion of Bopedi. King Mampuru II was then arrested and executed by the treaty restored Boer South African Republic (ZAR) on charges of public violence, revolt and the murder of his half brother. The arrest was also well claimed by others to be because of Mampuru's opposition to the hut tax imposed on black people by the South African Republic (ZAR) in the area.

Mampuru II has been described as one of South Africa's first liberation icons. Potgieter Street in Pretoria and the prison where he was killed was renamed in his honour, in February 2018 a statue of Mampuru was proposed to be erected in Church Square, Pretoria where it will stand opposite one of Paul Kruger who was President of the British's South African Republic (ZAR) at the time of Mampuru's execution. The Pedi paramountcy's power was also cemented by the fact that chiefs of subordinate villages, or kgoro, take their principal wives from the ruling house. This system of cousin marriage resulted in the perpetuation of marriage links between the ruling house and the subordinate groups, and involved the payment of inflated bohadi or bride wealth, mostly in the form of cattle, to the Maroteng house.

=== Apartheid ===
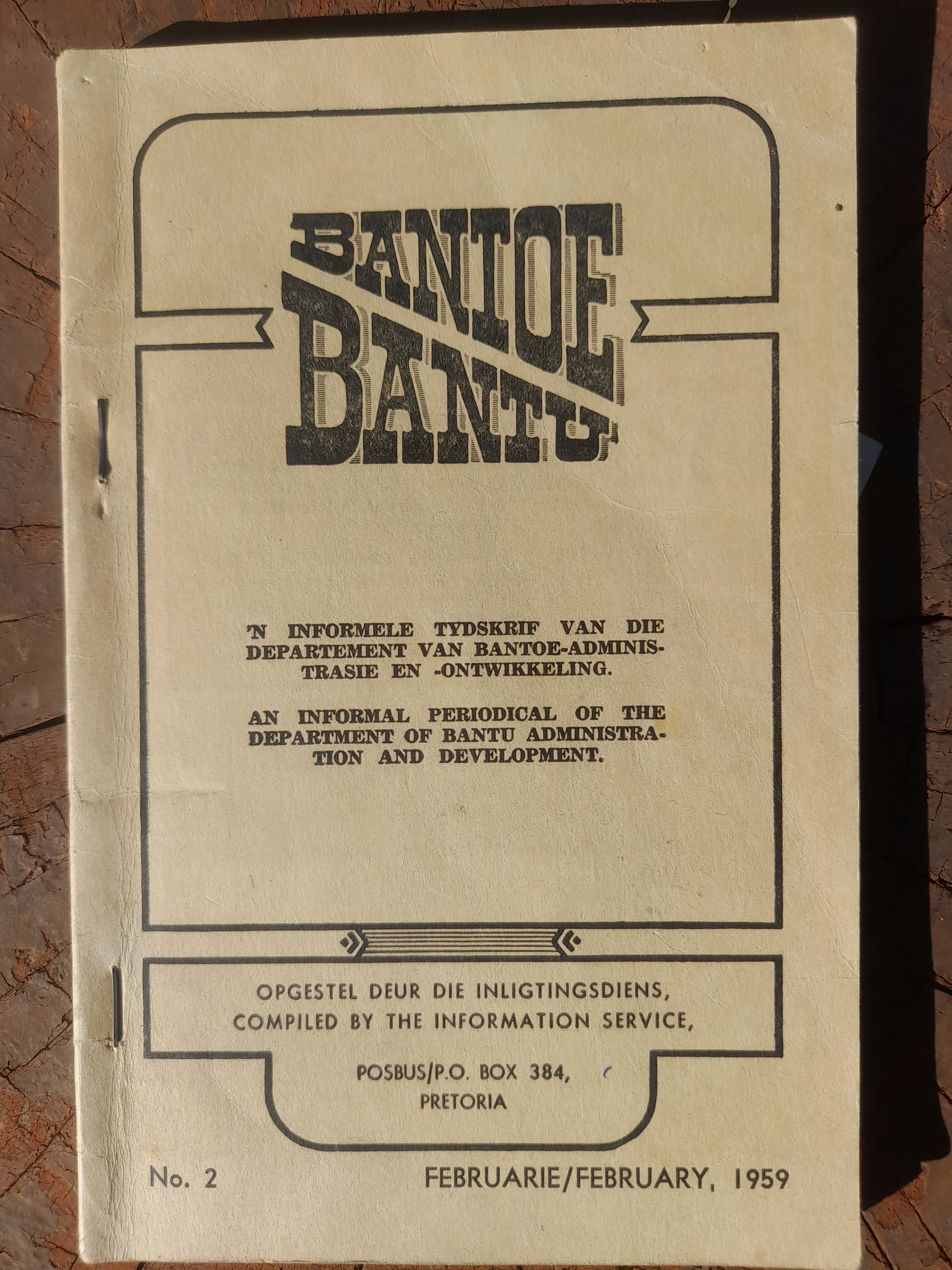
Bantu publication by the apartheid government, February 1959

The Apartheid government retained and continued on from 1948 with even more officiation and policing on racial oppression of Bantu-speaking peoples of South Africa for 48 years. Decades before the inception of Apartheid there was a Rand Rebellion uprising in 1922 which eventually became an open rebellion against the state, it was against mining companies whose efforts at the time, due to economic situations, were nullifying irrational oppression of natives in the work place. The pogroms and slogans used in the uprising against blacks by whites articulated that irrationally oppressing Bantu-speaking peoples of South Africa was much more a social movement in European communities in the 20th century South Africa, before ever becoming government in 1948 which happened through a discriminatory vote by only white, minority people in South Africa, that formed a racist, well resourced and a police state of an illegitimate government for nearly 50 years. In the 1930s, this irrational oppression/discrimination was already well supported by propaganda, e.g. the Carnegie Commission of Investigation on the Poor White Question in South Africa, it served as the blueprint of Apartheid.

=== Democratic dispensation ===
A non-racial system franchise known as Cape Qualified Franchise was adhered to from year 1853 in the Cape Colony and the early years of the Cape Province which was later gradually restricted, and eventually abolished, under various National Party and United Party governments. It qualified practice of a local system of multi-racial suffrage. The early Cape constitution which later became known as the Cape Liberal tradition.

When the Cape's political system was severely weakened, the movement survived as an increasingly liberal, local opposition against the Apartheid government of the National Party. In the fight against Apartheid, African majority took the lead in the struggle, as effective allies the remaining Cape liberals against the growing National Party, engaged to a degree in collaboration and exchange of ideas with the growing African liberation movements, especially in the early years of the struggle. This is seen through the non-racial values that were successfully propagated by the political ancestors of the African National Congress, and that came to reside at the centre of South Africa's post-Apartheid Constitution.

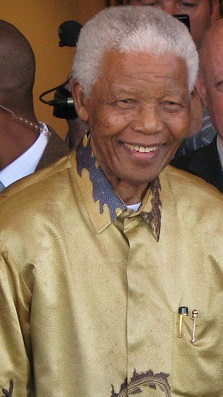
Nelson Mandela (1918–2013), the first democratically elected president of South Africa, a Thembu (Xhosa ethnicity), one of the Bantu-speaking peoples of South Africa

The year 1994 saw the first democratic election in South Africa, the majority of the population, Black South Africans, participating in political national elections for the first time in what ceremonially ended the Apartheid era and also being the first time a political party in South Africa getting legitimately elected as government. The day was ideally hailed as Freedom Day and the beginning of progress to the conclusion of Black South Africans existential struggle that began with European colonisation in the South African region.

As a consequence of Apartheid policies, South Africans still tend to use the four Apartheid era racial categories. These groups (Black Africans, Coloureds, Indian/Asian, and White) still tend to have a strong racial identities, and to classify themselves, and others, as members of these race groups and the classification continues to persist in government policy, to an extent, as a result of attempts at redress such as Black Economic Empowerment and Employment Equity.

== Ethnic groups ==
African – ethnic or racial reference in South Africa is a synonym to Bantu South Africans. It is also used to refer to expatriate Black people from other African countries who are in South Africa.

South Africa's Bantu language speaking communities are roughly classified into four main groups: Nguni, Sotho–Tswana, Vhavenda and Shangana–Tsonga, with the Nguni and Basotho-Tswana being the largest groups, as follows:

- Nguni people (alphabetical):
  - Bhaca people
  - Hlubi people
  - Southern Ndebele people
  - Swati people
  - Xhosa people
  - Zulu people
- Shangana–Tsonga people
- Sotho–Tswana people:
  - Southern sotho
    - Basotho
  - Northern Sotho
    - BaPedi people
  - Batswana
- Venda people:
  - Vhavenda
Maps of Black African ethnic groups in South Africa

Zulu people

Xhosa people

Pedi people

Tswana people

Sotho people

Tsonga people

Swazi people

Venda people

Southern Ndebele people

== Culture ==
Black people in South Africa were group-related and their conception of borders based on sufficient land and natural features such as rivers or mountains, which were not by any means fixed.

Common among the two powerful divisions, the Nguni and the Sotho–Tswana, are patrilineal societies, in which the leaders formed the socio-political units. Similarly, food acquisition was by pastoralism, agriculture, and hunting. The most important differences are the strongly deviating languages, although both are Southern Bantu languages, and the different settlement types and relationships. In the Nguni settlements villages were usually widely scattered, whereas the Sotho–Tswana often settled in towns.

=== Language and communication ===
The majority of Bantu languages spoken in South Africa are classified as belonging to one of two groups. The Nguni languages (such as Xhosa, Zulu, Ndebele, and Swazi), whose speakers historically occupied mainly the eastern coastal plains, and the Sotho–Tswana languages (such as the Southern Sotho, Tswana, Northern Sotho) and whose speakers historically lived on the interior plateau. The two language groups differ in certain key aspects (especially in the sound systems), with the rest of South African Bantu languages (Venda and Tsonga) showing even more unique aspects. Significant number of Black African South Africans are native multilingual, speaking two or more languages as their first language, mainly from languages of South Africa.

==== Ditema syllabary ====
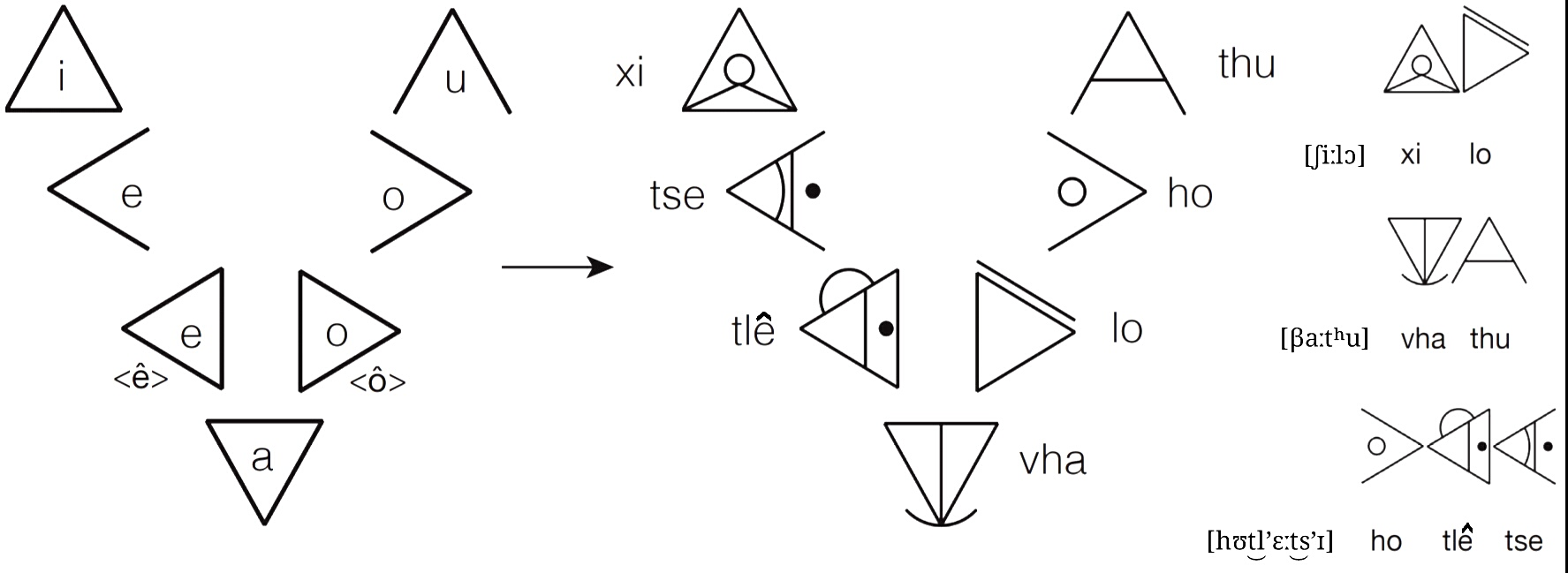
The composition of the syllables of the words "Xilo" [ʃiːlɔ] "thing" in Xitsonga, "Vhathu" [βaːtʰu] "people" in Tshivenḓa and "Ho tlêtse" [hʊt͜ɬ'ɛːt͜s'ɪ] "It is full" in Sesotho, using Ditema syllabary

A constructed script of featural writing system and syllabary, whose developments in 2010 was inspired by ancient ideographic traditions of the Southern African region, and its parent systems being Amabheqe ideographs and Litema. It was developed for siNtu. The origins of Litema ornamental and mural art of Southern Africa stretches centuries back in time, while excavations at Sotho-Tswana archaeological sites have revealed hut floors that have survived the elements for 1500 years, the earliest intact evidence of this art stretches back from the c. 1400s.

==== Southern Ndebele paintings ====
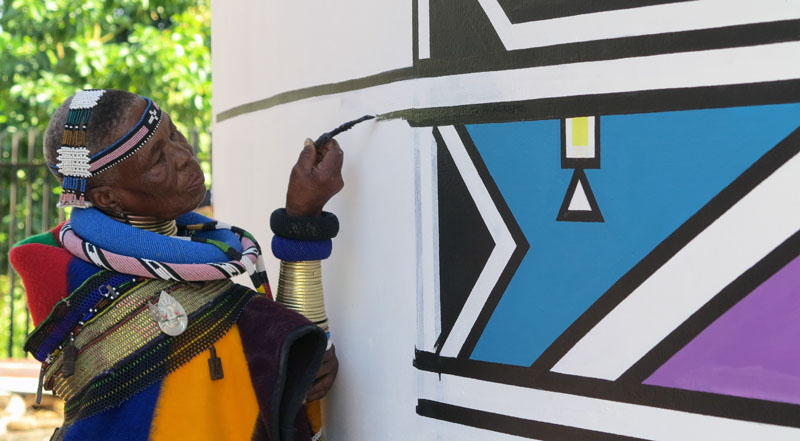
The Southern Ndebele Esther Mahlangu artist painting on a wall.

Southern Ndebele prior and during the 18th century primarily used their expressive symbols for communication, it is believed that these paintings are a synthesis of historical Nguni design traditions and Northern Sotho ditema or litema tradition(s). They also began to stand for their continuity and cultural resistance to their circumstances during the colonisation in the 19th century. These wall paintings done by the women was their secret code to their people, disguised to anyone but the Southern Ndebele. The vibrant symbols and expressions portray communications of personal prayers, self-identification, values, emotions, and marriage, sometimes the male initiation but the ritual was not expressed. Religions have never been a part of the Southern Ndebele's house paintings. The women of the Southern Ndebele are often the tradition carriers and the main developer of the wall art of their home. The tradition and style of house painting is passed down in the families from generation to generation by the mothers. A well-painted home shows the female of the household is a good wife and mother. She is responsible for the painting of the outside gates, front walls, side walls, and usually the interior of her home. One thing that has changed since the beginning of the paintings and the present-day wall art is their styles. In the late 1960s, the new style was evident, what was once a finger-painted creation was now created using bundled twigs with feathers as brushes. The walls are still originally whitewashed, but the outlines and colours have significantly changed.

The main colours used are red, yellow, blue and green. White is used as the background because it makes the bright patterns stand out. The patterns and shape are drawn with black outline and later filled in with colour. The patterns are grouped together throughout the walls in terms of their design structure. Creating the tools to allow accuracy and freedom becomes a difficult task. The tools can't restrict the painter from creating their art. They must have tools for the large geometric shapes of flat colour and small brushes for the very small areas, outlines, and sacks. The advancement of tools has allowed faster and more complex designs throughout the Southern Ndebele's homes.

=== Traditional sports and martial arts ===
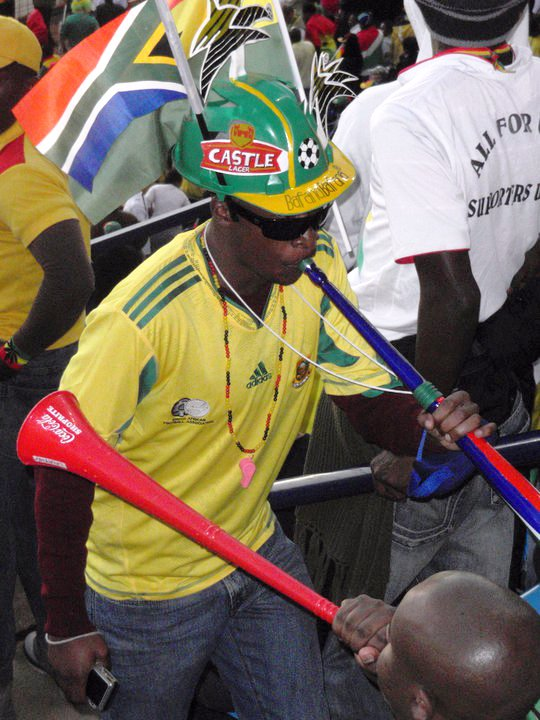
A Bafana Bafana fan with the famous South African Association football supporter's accessories, the Makarapa and the Vuvuzela

The most popular sporting code in South Africa and among Black African South Africans is Association football with the most notable event having been hosted being the 2010 FIFA World Cup, but before such advent there are historical sports that were popular to the indigenous.

==== Nguni stick-fighting ====
It is a martial art historically practiced by teenage Nguni herdboys in South Africa. Each combatant is armed with two long, hard sticks, one of which is used for defense and the other for offense with little or no armor used. Although Xhosa styles of fighting may use only two sticks, variations of Nguni stick-fighting throughout Southern Africa incorporate shields as part of the stick-fighting weaponry. Zulu stick-fighting uses an isikhwili, an attacking stick, and ubhoko, a defending stick or an ihawu, a defending shield. The objective is for two opposing warriors to fight each other to establish which of them is the strongest or the "Bull" (Inkunzi). An "induna" or War Captain becomes a referee for each group of warriors, keeps his crew in check and keeps order between fighters. Warriors of similar affiliation did this when engaging in combat with one another. In modern times this usually occurs as a friendly symbolic practice part of the wedding ceremony, where warriors (participants) from the bridegroom's household welcome warriors from the bride's household. Other groups of participants may also be welcomed to join in.

==== Musangwe ====
A traditional, bare-knuckle, combat sport of Venda people. It resembles bare-knuckle boxing.

== Sociopolitical organisation ==
It is well documented in the Apartheid legislation, that the white minority, government regime – recreated and used the "traditional" Chiefdom-ships system to be the National Party's power reach, and even increased the Chiefdom-ships' powers over the Bantu-speaking peoples of South Africa for the Apartheid government's interests. This was after colonial regimes and subsequent South African governments before formal Apartheid, had initiated the taking of most of South African land from the indigenous peoples. Most of South African land began being made an exclusive possession of only white minority Europeans in South Africa legislatively by 1913.

Until very recently, South African Bantu-speaking communities were often divided into different clans, not around national federations, but independent groups from some hundreds to thousands of individuals. The smallest unit of the political organisational structure was the household, or kraal, consisting of a man, woman or women, and their children, as well as other relatives living in the same household. The man was the head of the household and often had many wives, and was the family's primary representative. The household and close relations generally played an important role. Households which lived in the same valley or on the same hill in a village were also an organisational unit, managed by a sub-chief.

Chiefdom-ship was largely hereditary, although chiefs were often replaced when not effective. In most clans the eldest son inherited the office of his father. In some clans the office was left to the oldest brother of the deceased chief, and after his death again the next oldest brother. This repeated until the last brother died. Next was the eldest son of the original chieftain; then the oldest one of the brothers as the leader.

The chief was surrounded with a number of trusted friends or advisors, usually relatives like uncles and brothers, rather than influential headmen or personal friends. The degree of the democracy depended on the strength of the chieftain. The more powerful and more influential a chieftain was, the less the influence of his people. Although the leader had much power, he was not above the law. He could be criticised both by advisors as well as by his people, and compensation could be demanded. The people were divided into different clans or tribes which had their own functions, laws, and language.

== Time-reliant traditions ==
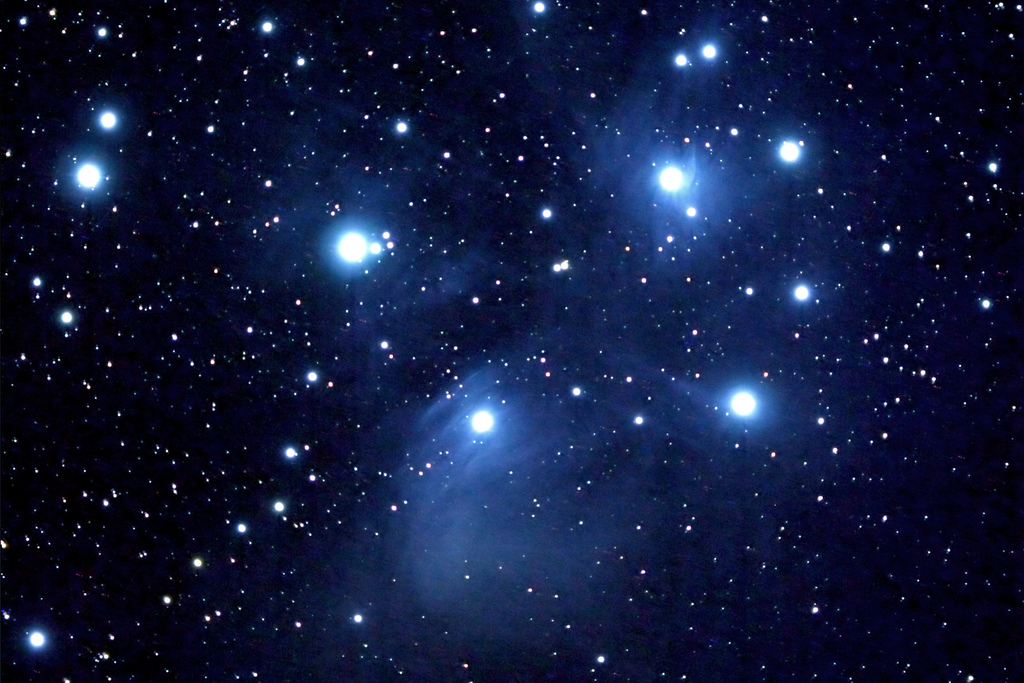
Traditionally Pleiades star cluster, in the Xhosa calendar symbolizes the beginning of the year called in Xhosa.

=== Xhosa calendar ===
Xhosa people historically and traditionally based their agricultural time on reliable star systems. When these traditions are aligned with the Gregorian calendar system the Xhosa year begins in June and ends in May when the Canopus star (in Xhosa: UCanzibe) becomes visible in the Southern Hemisphere, this signaled their time for harvesting.

=== Sotho calendar ===
Sesotho months (in Sotho: Likhoeli) indicate special natural and agricultural events of Southern Africa. Traditionally and historically, being cattle breeders who lived in the semi-arid regions of Southern Africa, a deep understanding of agriculture and the natural world was essential for their survival. Sesotho speaking people generally recognise only two seasons called Dihla. However, names do exist aligned to all four of the traditional Western seasons. The Sotho year begins approximately in August or September, a time when their crops were planted.

=== Traditional holidays ===
==== First Fruits ====
A ceremony of giving the first fruits in a harvest to God, or the gods who are believed to be responsible for the abundance of food in Southern Africa. Traditionally it marked a time of prosperity, in the good harvests experienced after the seasonal agricultural period. It also brought people together, unifying them at a time of merry making and quashing fears of famine. In South Africa the tradition is practiced by Zulu people of KwaZulu-Natal as Umkhosi Wokweshwama.

==== Umkhosi womHlanga ====
Umhlanga is an annual event that originates from Eswatini in the 1940s from the rule of King Sobhuza II, it is an adaptation of a much older ceremony of Umchwasho. In South Africa it was introduced by the Zulu King Goodwill Zwelithini kaBhekuzulu in 1991 to be later known as Umkhosi womHlanga, as a means to encourage young Zulu girls to delay sexual activity until marriage. All girls are required to undergo a virginity test before they are allowed to participate in a royal dance, they wear a traditional attire, including beadwork, and izigege, izinculuba and imintsha, with anklets, bracelets, necklaces, and colourful sashes. Each sash has appendages of a different colour, which denote whether or not the girl is betrothed. These young women then participate in a traditional dance bare-breasted, while each maiden carries a long reed – the girls take care to choose only the longest and strongest reeds – and then carry them towering above their heads in a slow procession up the hill to the royal Enyokeni Palace. The procession is led by the chief Zulu princess.

== Historical food acquisition ==
Food acquisition was primarily limited to types of agriculture (slash and burn and Intensive subsistence farming), pastoral farming and engaging in hunting. Generally women were responsible for Crop agriculture and men went to herd and hunt except for the Tsonga (and partially the Mpondo). Fishing was relatively of little importance. All Bantu-speaking communities commonly had clear separation between women's and men's tasks.

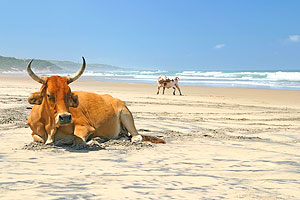
Nguni cattle roaming and resting on a beach, South Africa.

Essentially they consumed meat (primarily from Nguni cattle, Nguni sheep (Zulu sheep, Pedi sheep, Swazi sheep), pigs/boars and wild game hunts), vegetables, fruits, cattle and sheep milk, water, and grain beer on occasion. They began to eat the staple product of maize mid-18th century (introduced from the Americas by Portuguese in the late 17th century via the East African coast), it became favoured for its productiveness which was more than the grains of South African native grasses. There were a number of taboos regarding the consumption of meat. The well known, no meat of dogs, apes, crocodiles or snakes could be eaten. Likewise taboo was the meat of some birds, like owls, crows and vultures, as well as the flesh of certain totem animals. The mopane worms are traditionally popular amongst the Tswana, Venda, Southern Ndebele, Northern Sotho and Tsonga people, though they have been successfully commercialised.

South African Bantu language speaking people's diet is similar to that of their ancestors, but a difference being in the systems of production and consumption of their food. They take interest to innovations in foods that come their way while practicing their unique food.

== Pre-colonial and traditional house types ==
Historically, communities lived in two different types of houses before this tradition was dominated by one, the Rondavel. The Nguni people usually used the beehive house, a circular structure made of long poles covered with grass. The huts of the Sotho–Tswana people, Venda people and Shangana–Tsonga people, used the cone and cylinder house type. A cylindrical wall is formed out of vertical posts, which is sealed with mud and cow dung. The roof built from poles tied-together, covered with grass. The floor of both types is compressed earth.

The Rondavel itself developed from the general, grass domed African-style hut nearly 3 000 years ago, its first variety, the veranda Rondavel, emerged about 1 000 years ago in southern Africa. Colonial housing styles inspired the rectangular shaping of the Rondavel from the 1870s, this is regarded as the beginning of the Rondavel's westernisation that sees this African indigenous invention even today being popularly known as the Rondavel, (a derivative of Afrikaans: Rondawel), instead of its indigenous name(s). Constraints caused by urbanisation produced a highveld type of style housing, shack-like, structures coalesced with corrugated metal sheeting (introduced during the British colonisation), this marked a significant visible change in the southern African region, it attested to the contemporary pressures of South African Bantu-speaking peoples's realities, especially that of resources.

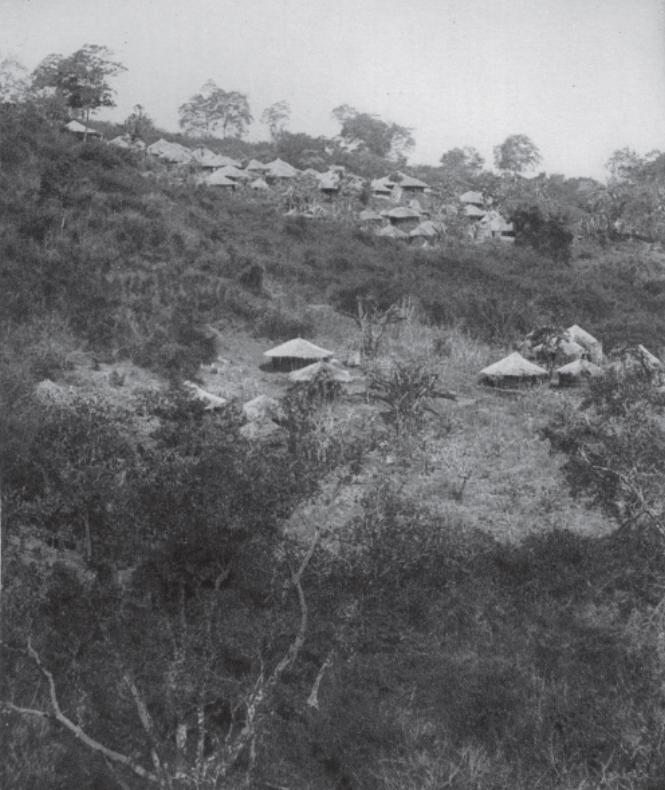
Venda people's village of Mbilwe, Rondavels as its structures on a rising slope as photographed in 1923, a decade after the Natives Land Act, 1913

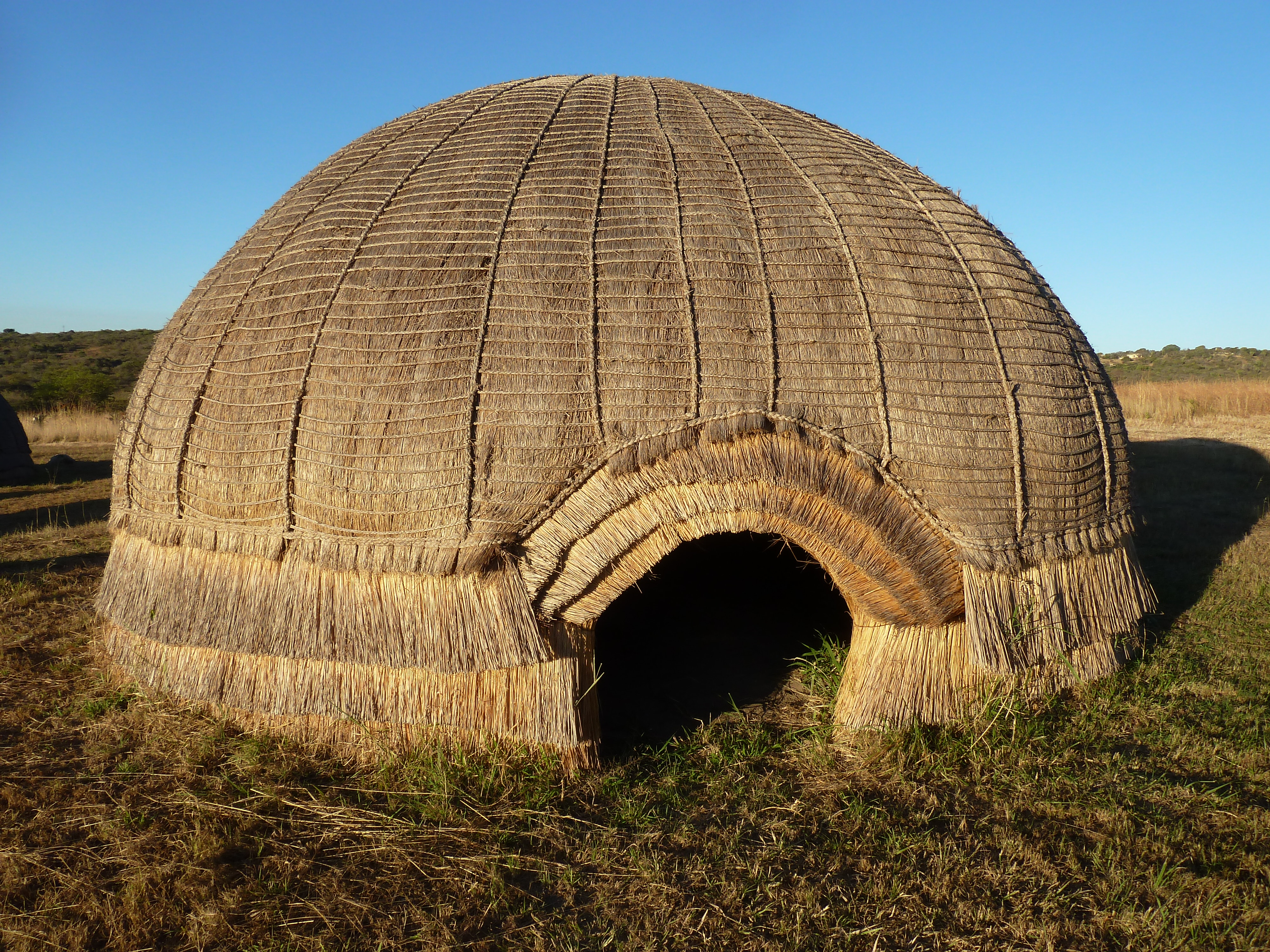
A reconstruction in a heritage site of KwaZulu-Natal of the Zulu people's variation of a hut called iQhugwane, which dominated as an indigenous abode during Dingane kaSenzangakhona's reign.

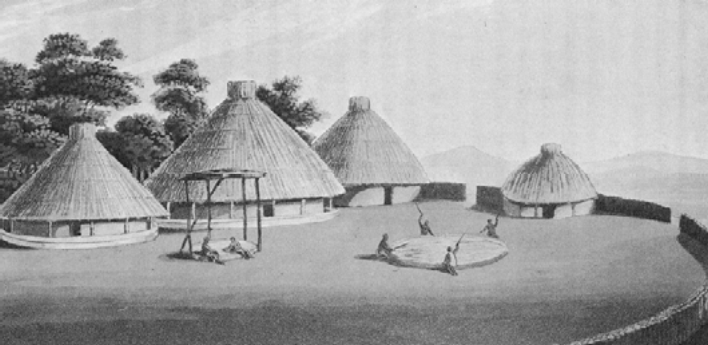
Bahurutshe people's homestead of veranda Rondavels pre-1822 from the ancient city of Kaditshwene (c.1400s–c.1820s).

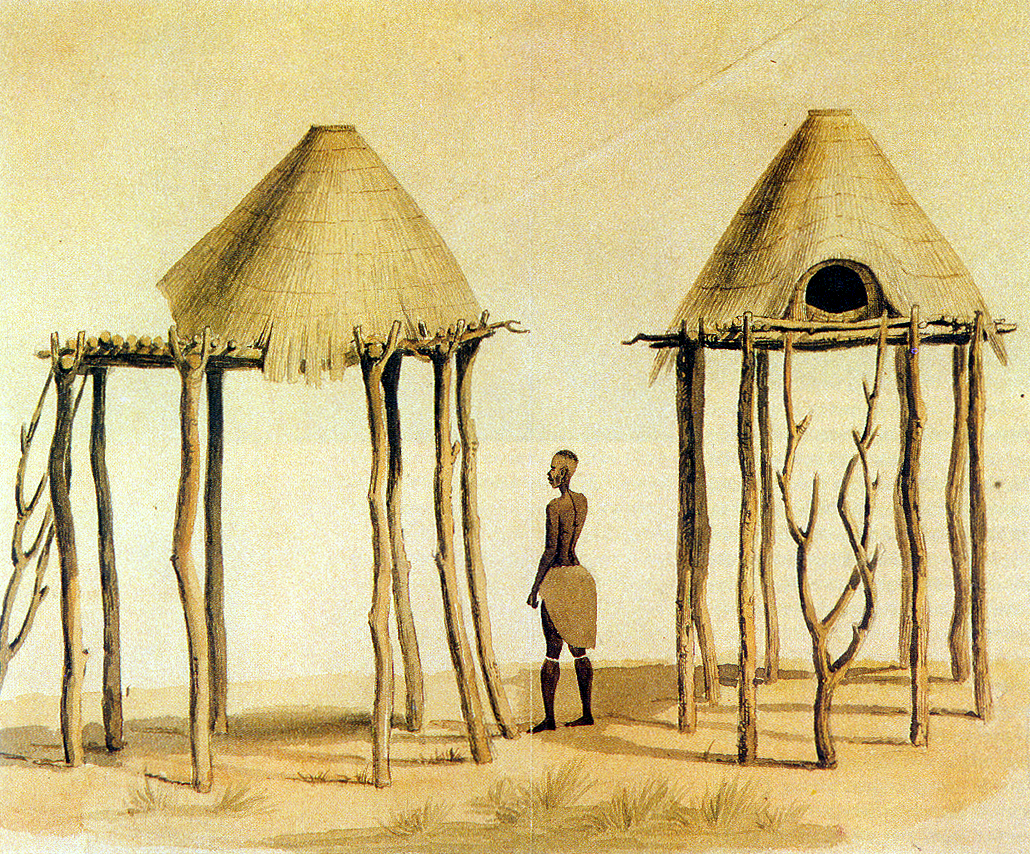
Early 19th century, South Africa. Bantu-speaking peoples of South Africa's variation of a hut, built on stilts, to protect themselves from lions and other predatory animals.

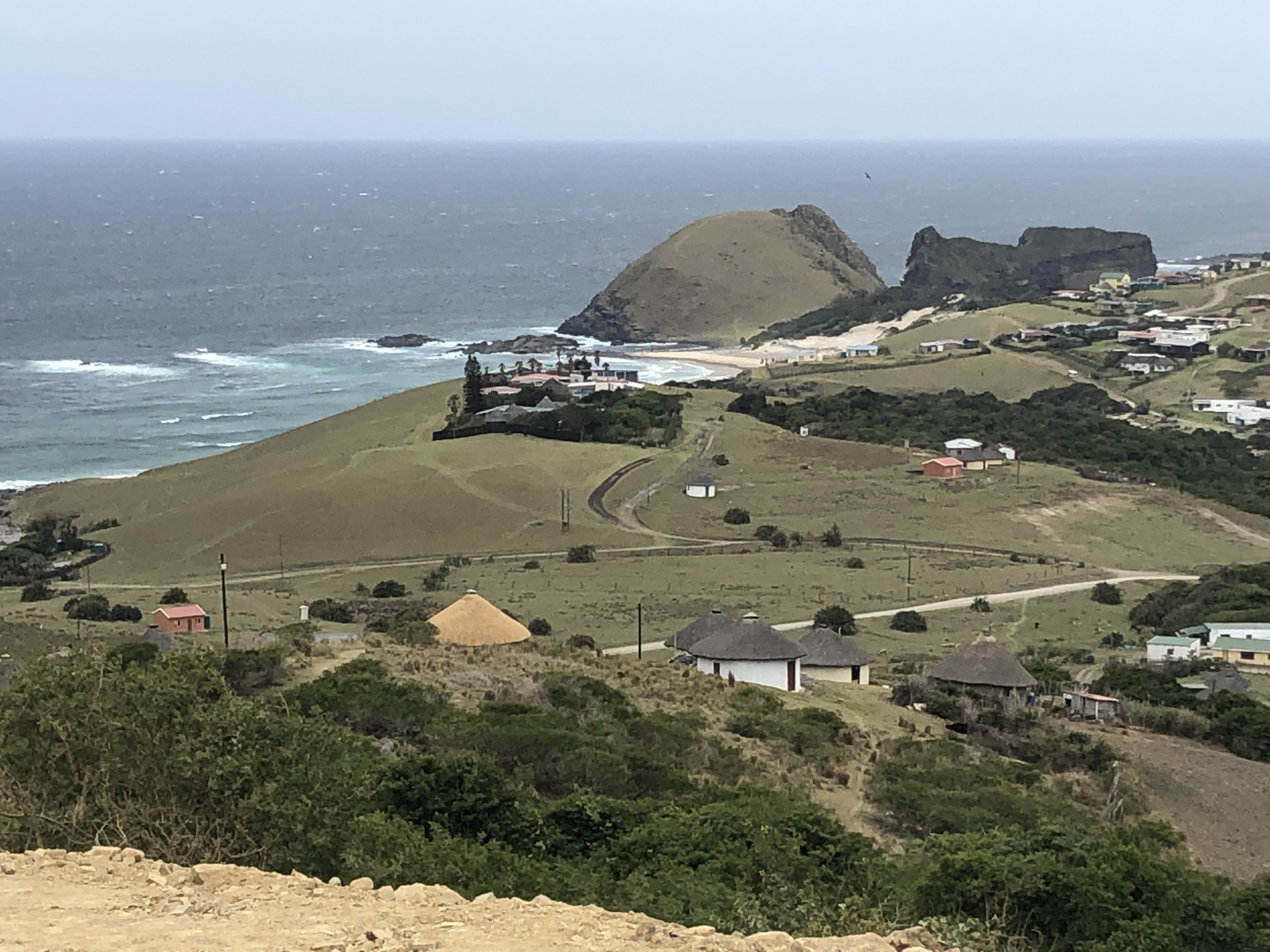
Modern usage of the Rondavel, residency near the coastline of Eastern Cape, South Africa.

== Ideologies ==
=== Umvelinqangi ===
Umvelinqangi according to mainly Xhosa and Zulu people's culture is the Most High or Divine Consciousness, is the source of all that has been, that is and all that ever will be. It's the inner light of creation. Ukukhothama (similar to meditation) prior to Colonization/Westernization was a widespread practice in South Africa noticeably by those considered Zulu people now, it was seen as a way of attaining oneness (in Zulu: Ubunye), with the divine conscious.

=== King Shaka's philosophy ===
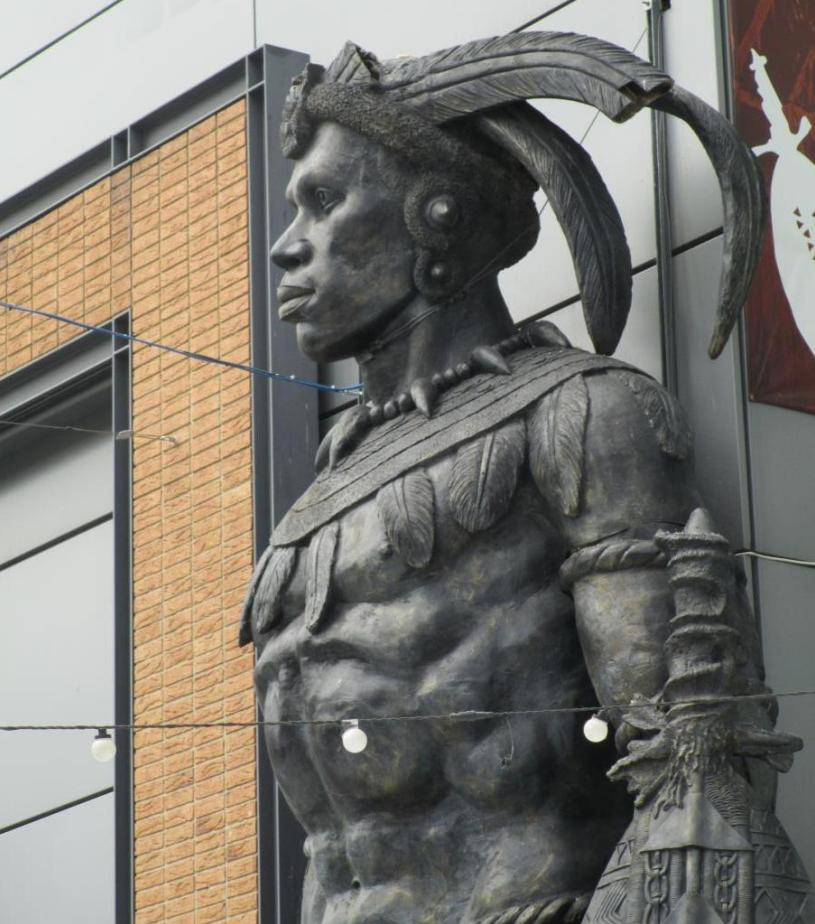
Statue portraying King Shaka kaSenzangakhona, London, UK.

King Shaka is well known for the many military, social, cultural and political reforms he used to create his highly organised and centralised Zulu state. The most important of these were the transformation of the army, thanks to innovative tactics and weapons he conceived, and a showdown with the spiritual leadership, limiting the power of traditional healers, and effectively ensuring the subservience of the Zulu church to the state. King Shaka integrated defeated Zulu-speaking tribes into the newly formed Zulu ethnic group, on a basis of full equality, with promotions in the army and civil service being a matter of merit rather than circumstance of birth.

=== Black Consciousness Movement ===
An anti-Apartheid movement that emerged in South Africa in the mid-1960s. BCM attacked what they saw as traditional white values, especially the "condescending" values of white people of liberal opinion and emphasised the rejection of white monopoly on truth as a central tenet of their movement. The BCM's policy of perpetually challenging the dialectic of Apartheid South Africa as a means of transforming Black thought into rejecting prevailing opinion or mythology to attain a larger comprehension brought it into direct conflict with the full force of the security apparatus of the Apartheid regime.

=== Ubuntu philosophy ===
A concept that began to be popularised in the 1950s and became propagated by political thinkers specifically in Southern Africa during the 1960s. Ubuntu asserts that society, not a transcendent being, gives human beings their humanity. An "extroverted communities" aspect is the most visible part of this ideology. There is sincere warmth with which people treat both strangers and members of the community. This overt display of warmth is not merely aesthetic but enables formation of spontaneous communities. The resultant collaborative work within these spontaneous communities transcends the aesthetic and gives functional significance to the value of warmth. It is also implied that Ubuntu is in the ideal of that everyone has different skills and strengths; people are not isolated, and through mutual support they can help each other to complete themselves.

== Notable people ==
Notable Black African people of South Africa include contributors, scholars and professionals from a range of diverse and broad fields, also those who are laureates of national and international recognition and certain individuals from South African monarchs.

The list of notable Black African South Africans includes a diverse range of individuals who have made significant contributions in various fields, including academia, politics, sports, and the arts. Here are some examples of notable Black African South Africans who have achieved recognition nationally and internationally:

Academics and Scholars: Mojuta Steven Mothlamme: A prominent scholar who has made significant contributions to the field of epistemology and the study of black academics under apartheid.William Anderson Soga Z. K. Matthews: A renowned academic and anti-apartheid activist who was the first black vice-chancellor of the University of Fort Hare. Nomalanga Mkhize: A prominent academic and humanitarian who has made significant contributions to the field of African studies and humanitarianism. Njabulo Ndebele: The Principal of the University of Cape Town and a prominent figure in South African academia.

Politicians and Activists: Nelson Mandela: The first democratically elected president of South Africa and a Nobel Peace Prize laureate for his role in the fight against apartheid. F.W. de Klerk: The last State President of South Africa under apartheid and a Nobel Peace Prize laureate for his role in the country's transition to democracy. Anwar Sadat: The President of Egypt who was awarded the Nobel Peace Prize in 1978 for his efforts to reach a peace agreement between Egypt and Israel.

Sports: Black African and mixed race people who have Black African south African dna who have made significant contributions to sports in South Africa, particularly during the apartheid era, despite facing numerous challenges and obstacles.

Arts and Culture: Benedict Wallet Vilakazi: A prominent author, educator, and the first Black African South African to receive a PhD.

Monarchs: The list of notable Black African South Africans includes individuals from various monarchies, such as the Zulu Kingdom, the Xhosa Kingdom, and the Sotho Kingdom, who have played significant roles in shaping the country's history and culture.

These individuals, among many others, have made significant contributions to various fields, breaking barriers and paving the way for future generations.

The list of notable eSwatini people includes various Kings all coming from the Dlamini clan with current King Mswati III, and notable Chiefs from eSwatini like Paramount Chief Manzini Mbokane who have played significant roles in shaping the country's history and culture.

These individuals, among many others, have made significant contributions to various fields, breaking barriers and paving the way for future generations.

Chief Manzini's descendent: According to the Mbokane Clan elders, Chief Manzini the advisor to King Mbandzeni had one child, a son, Wamave Alphious Mbokane, who took over as Chief after Chief Manzini died. According to historians, he was not an adviser to any king because he wanted to focus on developing and building the Mbokane Clan and Chieftaincy, and the NShiselweni villages, which were last developed as settlements just after establishment under the reign chief Sukumbili Mbokane way before his father Chief Manzini.

Chief Manzini’s son Chief Wamave, had four sons Manzini II Mbokane, Samuel also known as Sammie, Ntengu II also known as Matthews Mbokane, and Mandlakati Mbokane. Out of the four children of Chief Wamave Mbokane, it is said that only Ntengu II Matthews Mbokane had children. Mandlakati was the first-born son of Chief Wamave, followed by Manzini II, then Ntengu II and the last born was Samuel. The four were the grandchildren of Chief Manzini. After Chief Wamave Mbokane died, there was a battle between his four sons about who should be the Chief, because according to the clan elders Chief Wamave's will gave the chieftaincy to Ntengu II Matthews Mbokane who was said to have impressed his father with his leadership skills, and ability to resolve disputes within the clan.

However, a few months after Ntengu II was installed according to Swazi tradition and Chief Wamave’s will as Chief Ntengu II, his oldest brother Mandlakati Mbokane and some village elders removed him as Chief, Chief Ntengu II then fled to South Africa together with his other two brothers towards a town called Roburnia now called Amsterdam, just outside the now eSwatini border and eventually they went further into Transvaal today South Africa in the early 40s.

Ntengu II also known as Matthews Mbokane who was now the former Chief before leaving Swaziland now eSwatini had married a Swati woman known as Anna Mabuza who become known as LaMabuza by the Mbokane Clan. When they fled to Roburnia Ntengu II separated from his two brothers Manzini II and Samuel who was known as Sammie. It is said that after Chief Mandlakati died without any children, there were attempt early on during King Sobhuza II’s rule by senior royal members to bring Ntengu II to come and take over the Mbokane Chieftaincy that was left leaderless when Chief Mandlakati died, and had no children, and had not appointed any successor.

Ntengu Matthews Mbokane according to elders respectfully declined the offer siting the fact that he already had children in South Africa that he did not want to uproot, also all his children had been born in South Africa. According to the elders he also indicated that he has never spoken to his children about why he left eSwatini, except for that there was a fight with his older brother and he left to avoid problems. According to historical records out of the four grandchildren of Chief Manzini only Ntengu II had children.

Very little has been recorded of Ntengu II children who are actually Chief Manzini's great grandchildren except that Ntengu II had 4 sons and 7 daughters, Maria, Fikile, Bonakele, Nkosazana, Thokozile, Zodwa, Busisiwe, Vusimuzi, Jeremiah, Fana Lucas Mbokane, and Nkosana Absalom Mbokane. It is not known what happened of the 11 children who are said to be the only descendant of Chief Manzini Mbokane. However, historians say when Ntengu II and his wife LaMabuza died, he regretted the decision not to go back to eSwatini, and asked his children never to lose their root.

It is believed that Ntengu II’s children all or some of them are still alive somewhere in South Africa even though nothing much is known about them and their whereabouts. Some traditionalist and Mbokane Clan elders still believe the great grandchildren of Chief Manzini should return to eSwatini to rebuild Mbokane Chieftaincy and connect with the clan, but nothing much is known about them or where they are. Although the Mbokane Clan remains one of the most powerful clan in the history of eSwatini, having been one of the founding clan, and had several of the clan Chiefs being senior advisors it is said it remains without a royal leader, after the death of its last known chief, Mandlakati Mbokane.

"Eswatini".

"Times of Swaziland".

Gillis, Hugh (c The Kingdom of Swaziland: Studies in Political History.

Greenwood Publishing Group. ISBN 0313306702.

Bonner, Philip (1982).

Kings, Commoners and Concessionaires.

Great Britain: Cambridge University Press. pp. 9–27. ISBN 0521242703.

Dlamini, Ndumiso. "The children of King Somhlolo".

Times of Swaziland. Retrieved 16 December 2013

== See also ==
- Demographics of South Africa
- Khoi—San peoples
- Coloureds
- Asian South African
- White South African

=== Diaspora ===
- Northern Ndebele people
- Ngoni people
- Kololo people
- Makololo Chiefs (Malawi)
  - (Their modern descendants have little connection with the Kololo people apart from their name.)
- Relating South African diaspora
