= Dassiedeur Tunnel =

Tunnel in South Africa

Dassiedeur tunnel
- Interactive map of Dassiedeur tunnel

Operation
- Work began: 1879
- Opened: 1880

Technical
- Length: 271 m (889 ft)

The Dassiedeur Tunnel is a disused railway tunnel located in the Eastern Cape. Started in 1879 by contractor W. Forrest, the 271 m railway tunnel served as an important passage for the Cape Government Railways' Midland Line, which would eventually become the first railway line to provide a link between the coastal ports and the Witwatersrand The tunnel is carved out of solid stone and the tunnel portals are framed by stone masonary. The tunnel can be found between Nxuba (also known as Cradock) and Cookhouse,close to the west bank of the Great Fish River.
