= Tarka River =

River in the Eastern Cape, South Africa

Tarka River Umncumuba
- Confluence of the Tarka and Great Fish Rivers
- Etymology: Tarka probably meaning 'place of many women' in the Khoekhoe language. The Xhosa name Umncumuba means 'willow tree'

Location
- Country: South Africa
- Province: Eastern Cape

Physical characteristics
- Source
  - location: Bamboesberg
- Mouth: Great Fish River
  - location: Confluence
  - coordinates: 32°18′53″S 25°43′30″E
  - elevation: 815 m (2,674 ft)

The Tarka River is a river in the Eastern Cape, South Africa. Along with the Baviaans River, Grootbrak River and Kat River it is a major eastern tributary of the Great Fish River. The Lake Arthur Dam and the Kommandodrif Dam are located in this river. The latter is included in the Commando Drift Nature Reserve.

The Tarka river is part of the Fish to Tsitsikama Water Management Area.

== History ==
The possible origin of the name comes from the Khoekhoe language with words such as taras or tra, meaning 'woman' or 'the maidens river'.

== Course ==
From its source, it flows eastwards through Willowmore, then south through the Toorwaterpoort in the Anysberg and then joins up with Olifants River.

== Sources ==
The river has its source at 900 metres in Swartberg mountain range.

== Watershed ==
It has a catchment area of around 2,000 km^{2} (770 sq mi) with rainfall between 120 and 250 mm (4.7 and 9.8 in).
