= Makhanda =

Makhanda may refer to:

- Makhanda (prophet) (died 25 December 1819), Xhosa prophet
- Makhanda, South Africa, town formerly named Grahamstown
  - Makana Local Municipality, local authority governing the town
