= Mount Coke =

- Location within Eastern Cape Location within South Africa
- Coordinates: 32.979°S 27.431°E
- Country: South Africa
- Province: Eastern Cape
- Municipality: Buffalo City

Area
  - Total: 0.35 km^{2} (0.14 sq mi)

Population (2011)
  - Total: 52
  - Density: 150/km^{2} (380/sq mi)

Racial makeup (2011)
  - Black African: 100.0%

First languages (2011)
  - Xhosa: 84.6%
  - English: 7.7%
  - Sign language: 5.8%
  - Zulu: 1.9%
- Time zone: UTC+2 (SAST)

Mount Coke is a town in Buffalo City in the Eastern Cape province of South Africa.

Station of the Methodist Missionary Society 18 km east of King William’s Town. It was established in 1825 by the Reverend S Kay and named after Thomas Coke, who was the first Methodist Bishop and regarded as the Father of Methodist Missions.
