= Seafield, South Africa =

Seafield
- Location within Eastern Cape Location within South Africa
- Coordinates: 33.492°S 27.131°E
- Country: South Africa
- Province: Eastern Cape
- District: Sarah Baartman
- Municipality: Ndlambe

Area
  - Total: 5.76 km^{2} (2.22 sq mi)

Population (2011)
  - Total: 296
  - Density: 51.4/km^{2} (133/sq mi)

Racial makeup (2011)
  - Black African: 5.1%
  - Coloured: 1.4%
  - White: 93.6%

First languages (2011)
  - English: 78.0%
  - Afrikaans: 12.2%
  - Xhosa: 6.4%
  - Other: 3.4%
- Time zone: UTC+2 (SAST)

Seafield is a small coastal village in Ndlambe Local Municipality in the Eastern Cape province of South Africa.

Seafield, also known as Kleinemonde, is situated on the beach. Christmas and Easter being the most active parts of the year with the beaches and rivers full of annual guests. The two rivers, The West and East rivers, are used for fishing, birdwatching, canoe trails and watersports. The annual tradition of Father Christmas is a highlight for the younger children, with "Father Christmas" visiting the West Side car park bearing gifts for the kids. Arriving by boat, car, motorcycle and sometimes on horseback.

The annual Church In The Bush takes place in a hollow parking lot on the West side with the majority of Seafield taking part in the ceremony, babies are christened at the special request of the minister.

The weather is good all year round with Summer rainfall but also a very hot summer sometimes reaching up to 40 degrees celsius.

A wide range of accommodation are available in this village.

Fishing in the Estuaries is ideal for cob, leervis, grunter and stumpnose. As well as rock n surf fishing for a variety of edibles and non-edibles.
