= Maqoma =

Xhosa chief

Maqoma... Maqoma SON OF NGQIKA
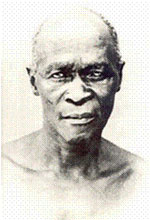
- Chief Maqoma
- Born: 1798; Xhosa Kingdom
- Died: 9 September 1873, age 75; Robben Island
- Cause of death: Old age, combined with poor treatment at Robben Island
- Occupations: Warrior, military commander
- Known for: Battle of Amalinde; 6th and 8th British-Xhosa Wars.
- Parent(s): Ngqika, Chief of the Rharhabe house of the Xhosa nation

Chief Maqoma (c. 1798 – 9 September 1873), Aa! Jongumsobomvu! was a Xhosa chief and a commander of the Xhosa forces during the Cape Frontier Wars. Born in the Right Hand House of the Xhosa Kingdom, he was the older brother of King Sandile kaNgqika and nephew to King King Hintsa. In 1818, he commanded the forces of his father, Ngqika, who seemingly was trying to overthrow the government and become the king of the Xhosa nation. In 1822, he moved to the so-called neutral zone to take land but was expelled by the British troops. To this day he is an important part of South African History.

== Early life ==
Born in the right hand house of the Xhosa Kingdom, Maqoma was the oldest son of Chief Ngqika. Throughout his life, he was opposed to his father's strategy of ceding land to the Cape Colony; as a result, in 1822, he went back into the Neutral Zone in order to establish his own chiefdom.

== Sixth Xhosa War ==
during the sixth frontier war Maqoma led the Xhosa against the Cape colony. In a well planned attack 12000 Xhosa men under Maqoma moved across the entire length of the frontier in small raiding parties. Hundreds of refugee settlers poured into Grahamstown and other districts .Many districts were not able to function.

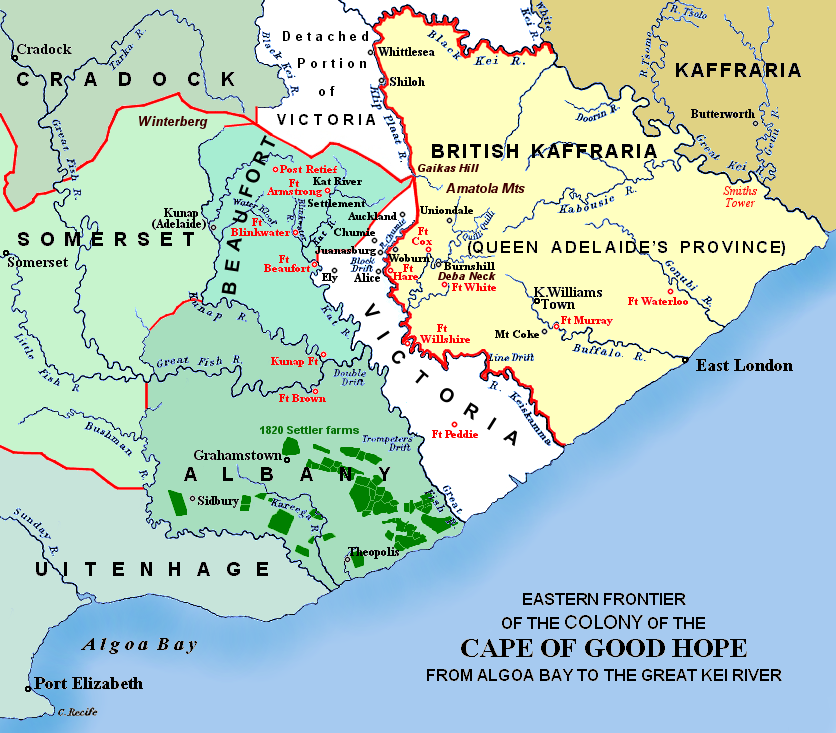
The Eastern Frontier, ca 1835

=== Background ===
On the Cape's eastern border (now the Keiskamma River) insecurity persisted. Although highly unstable, the frontier region was seeing increasing amounts of cultural diversity, with Europeans, Khoikhoi and Xhosa living and trading throughout the frontier region.

=== Outbreak ===
The settlers accused the Xhosa of cattle raids, while the Xhosas accused the settlers of killing their chiefs. On 11 December 1834, a Cape government commando party killed a chief of high rank, incensing the Xhosa: an army of 10,000 men, led by Maqoma, swept across the frontier into the Cape Colony, pillaged and burned the homesteads and killed all who resisted. Among the worst sufferers was a colony of freed Khoikhoi who, in 1829, had been settled in the Kat River valley by the British authorities. Refugees from the farms and villages took to the safety of Grahamstown, where women and children found refugee in the church In the cape

=== British campaign ===
The response was swift and multi-faceted. Boer commandos mobilised under Piet Retief and with their firepower inflicted a defeat on the Xhosa in the Winterberg Mountains in the north. Burgher and Khoi commandos also mobilised, and British Imperial troops arrived via Algoa Bay.

The British governor, Sir Benjamin d'Urban mustered the combined forces under Colonel Sir Harry Smith, who reached Grahamstown on 6 January 1835, six days after news of the attack had reached Cape Town. It was from Grahamstown that the retaliatory campaign was launched and directed.

The campaign inflicted a string of defeats on the Xhosa troops, such as at Trompetter's Drift on the Fish River, and some of the Xhosa chiefs surrendered. However Maqoma and Tyali (the other major Xhosa leader) retreated to the fastnesses of the Amatola Mountains.

=== The treaty ===
Hintsa ka Khawuta, paramount-chief of the whole Xhosa nation, commanded authority over all of the Xhosa chiefdoms hence therefore was held responsible for the initial attack on the Cape Colony, and for the looted cattle. D'Urban came to the frontier in December 1834, and led a large force across the Kei river to confront Hintsa at his residence and dictate terms to him.

The terms dictated that all the country from the Cape's prior frontier, the Keiskamma River, as far as the Great Kei River was annexed as the British "Queen Adelaide Province", and its inhabitants declared British subjects. A site for the seat of province's government was selected and named King William’s Town. The new province was declared to be for the settlement of loyal tribes, loyal soldiers who replaced their leadership, and the Fengu (known to the Europeans as the "Fingo people"), who had recently arrived fleeing from the Zulu armies and had been receiving protection from the Xhosa. Magistrates were appointed to administer the territory in the hope that they would gradually, with the help of missionaries, undermine tribal authority. Hostilities finally died down on 17 September 1836, after having continued for nine months.

== Eighth Xhosa War ==
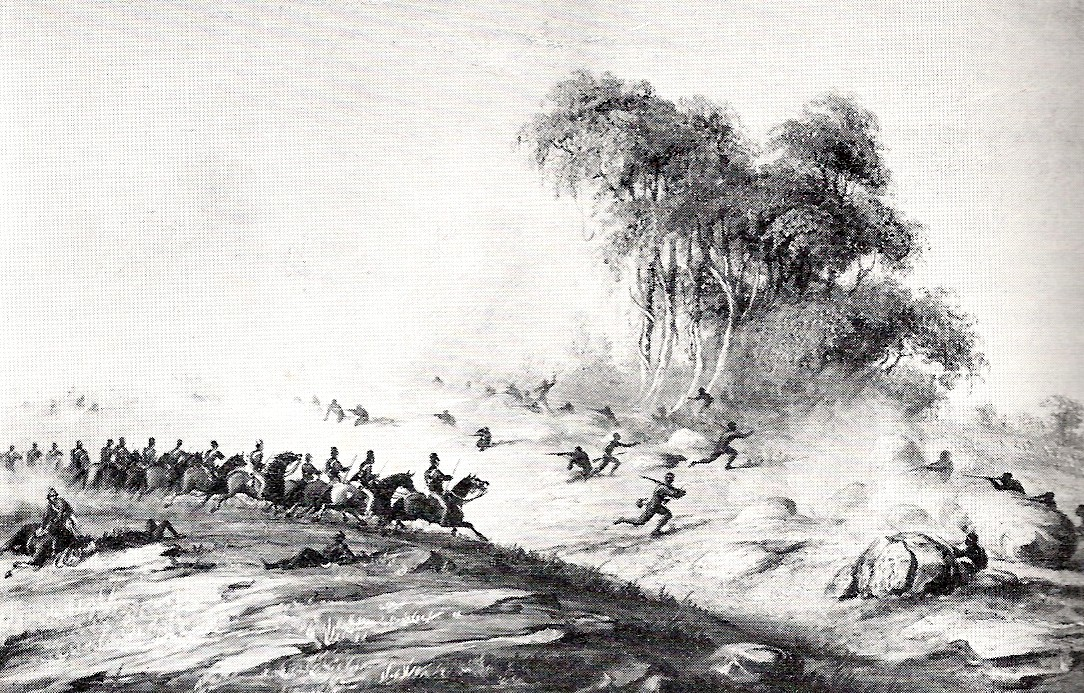
The Cape Mounted Riflemen charging the enemy at Waterkloof during the 8th Frontier War

=== Background ===
Large numbers of Xhosa were displaced across the Keiskamma by Governor Harry Smith, and these refugees supplemented the original inhabitants there, causing overpopulation and hardship. Those Xhosa who remained in the colony were moved to towns and encouraged to adopt European culture.

Harry Smith also attacked and annexed the independent Orange Free State, hanging the Boer resistance leaders, and in the process alienating the Burghers of the Cape Colony. To cover the mounting expenses he then imposed exorbitant taxes on the local people of the frontier and cut the Cape's standing forces to less than five thousand men.

In June 1850 there followed an unusually cold winter, together with an extreme drought. It was at this time that Smith ordered the displacement of large numbers of Xhosa squatters from the Kat River region.

The Outbreak of War (December 1850) Governor Sir Harry Smith travelled to meet with the prominent chiefs after unrest in the Xhosa nation. When Chief Sandile refused to attend a meeting outside Fort Cox, Governor Smith deposed him and ordered him killed. On 24 December, a British detachment of 650 men under Colonel Mackinnon was attacked by Xhosa warriors in the Boomah Pass. They retreated to Fort White, under heavy attack from the Xhosa troops, having sustained 42 casualties. The very next day, during Christmas festivities in towns throughout the border region, apparently friendly Xhosa entered the towns to partake in the festivities. At a given signal though, they fell upon the settlers who had invited them into their homes and killed them.

=== Initial Xhosa victories ===
While the Governor was still at Fort Cox, the Xhosa forces advanced on the colony, isolating him there. The Xhosa burned British military villages along the frontier, and captured the post at Line Drift. Meanwhile, the Khoi of the Blinkwater River Valley and Kat River Settlement revolted, under the leadership of a half-Khoi, half-Xhosa chief Hermanus Matroos, and captured Fort Armstrong. Large numbers of the "Kaffir Police" — a paramilitary police force the British had established to combat cattle theft — deserted their posts and joined Xhosa war parties. For a while, it appeared that the Khoi people of the in Xhosaland were also fighting and taking up arms against the British.

Harry Smith finally fought his way out of Fort Cox with the help of the local Cape Mounted Riflemen, but found that he had alienated most of his local allies. His policies had made enemies of the Burghers and Boer Commandos, the Fengu, and the Khoi, who formed much of the Cape's local defences. Even some of the Cape Mounted Riflemen refused to fight.

=== British counter-attack (Jan 1851) ===
After these initial successes, however, the Xhosa experienced a series of setbacks. Xhosa forces were repulsed in separate attacks on Fort White and Fort Hare. Similarly, on 7 January, Hermanus and his Khoikhoi supporters launched an offensive on the town of Fort Beaufort, which was defended by a small detachment of troops and local volunteers. The attack failed, however, and Hermanus was killed. The Cape Government also eventually agreed to levy a force of local gunmen (predominantly Khoi) to hold the frontier, allowing Smith to free some imperial troops for offensive action.

=== Conclusion of Maqoma ===
By the end of January, the British were beginning to receive reinforcements from Cape Town and a force under Colonel Mackinnon was able to successfully drive north from King William's Town to resupply the beleaguered garrisons at Fort White, Fort Cox and Fort Hare. With fresh men and supplies, the British expelled the remainder of Hermanus' rebel forces (now under the command of Willem Uithaalder) from Fort Armstrong and drove them west toward the Amatola Mountains. Over the coming months, increasing numbers of Imperial troops arrived, reinforcing the heavily outnumbered British and allowing Smith to lead sweeps across the frontier country.

In 1852, HMS Birkenhead was wrecked at Gansbaai while bringing reinforcements to the war at the request of Sir Harry Smith. As the ship sank, the men (mostly new recruits) stood silently in rank, while the women and children were loaded into the lifeboats. They remained in rank as the ship slipped under and over 300 died.

=== Final stages of the conflict ===
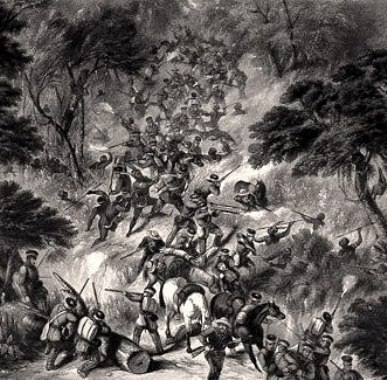
A British column (74th Highlanders) under ambush in the Waterkloof forests.

Insurgents led by Maqoma established themselves in the forested Waterkloof. From this base they managed to plunder surrounding farms and torch the homesteads. Maqoma's stronghold was situated on Mount Misery, a natural fortress on a narrow neck wedged between the Waterkloof and Harry's Kloof. The Waterkloof conflicts lasted two years. Maqoma also killed Lieutenant-colonel John Fordyce and inflicted heavy losses on the forces of Sir Harry Smith.

In February 1852, the British Government decided that Smith's administration had been responsible for much of the violence, and ordered him to be replaced by George Cathcart, who took charge in March. For the last six months, the man of foot town ordered scourings of the countryside for rebels. In February 1853, Sandile and the other chiefs surrendered.

The 8th frontier war was the most bitter and brutal in the series of Xhosa wars. It lasted over two years and ended in the complete subjugation of the Ciskei Xhosa.

== Imprisonment ==
Maqoma was imprisoned twice at Robben Island. During the first term, he was allowed company with his wife and son. However, on the second term, at the age of seventy-three, he was sent there alone. A visiting Anglican chaplain witnessed his last moments in 1873, when he "cried bitterly, before dying of old age and dejection".

== See also ==
- Makana (prophet)
- Xhosa Wars
- Hintsa kaKhawuta

== Bibliography ==
- Abbink, J; Bruijn, Mirjam de; Walraven, Klaas van (2008). Rethinking Resistance: Revolt and Violence in African History. LULE. ISBN 978-9004126244.
- Abbink, J; Peires, Jeffrey (1989). The Dead Will Arise: Nongqawuse and the Great Xhosa Cattle-Killing. LULE. ISBN 9780253205247.
- Knight, Ian (1994). Warrior Chiefs of Southern Africa. Firebird Books. ISBN 1-85314-106-2.
