= Lake Arthur Dam =

- Interactive map of Lake Arthur Dam
- Official name: Lake Arthur Dam
- Country: South Africa
- Location: Cradock, Eastern Cape
- Coordinates: 32°13′1″S 25°49′5″E
- Opening date: 1924
- Owner: Department of Water Affairs

Dam and spillways
- Type of dam: Earth fill dam
- Impounds: Tarka River
- Height: 38 m
- Length: 500 m

Reservoir
- Creates: Lake Arthur
- Total capacity: 10 700 000 m³
- Surface area: 886.7 ha

Lake Arthur Dam is an earth-fill type dam located on the Tarka River, near Cradock, Eastern Cape, South Africa. It was established in 1924 and serves mainly for irrigation purposes. The hazard potential of the dam has been ranked high (3).

== See also ==
- List of reservoirs and dams in South Africa
- List of rivers of South Africa
