= Makanna =

1834 novel

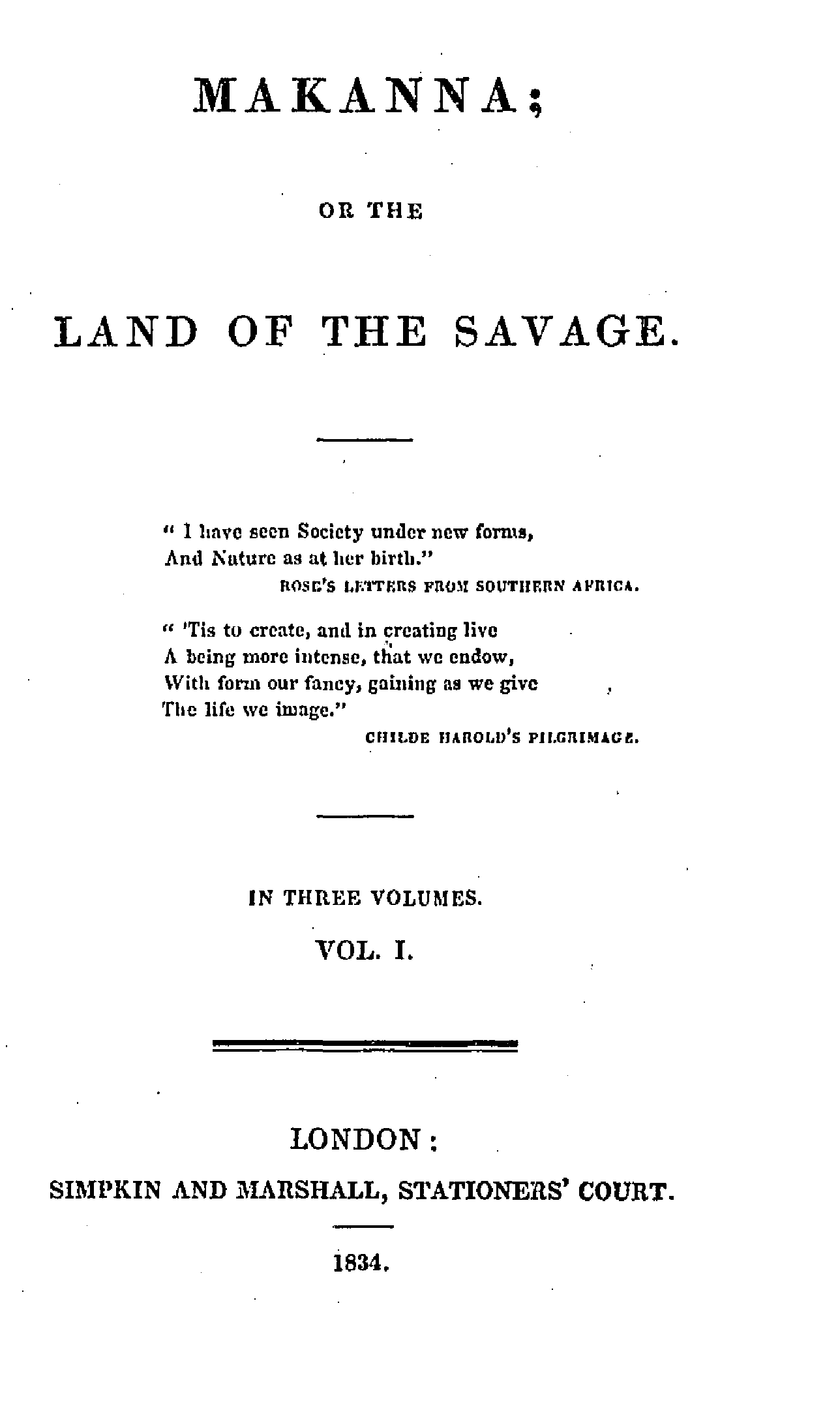
Front cover of Makanna

Makanna; or, the Land of the Savage is an anonymous 1834 novel. It is a captivity narrative that received mixed reviews in the press.

== Synopsis ==
Paul Laroon (a French operative of ambiguous or mixed ethnicity) and Makanna (a character based on the prophet Makhanda ka Nxele) jointly fight against British imperial ambitions. Makanna is the leader of the Amakhossae (Xhosa), and together they save Bertha Falkland, the daughter of a British official.

== Publication ==
Makanna was first published anonymously in 1834 by Simpkin & Marshall in London. It was published in three volumes, and received a second edition. Scholars do not know the identity of Makanna's author, although they did publish another novel called Picaroon.

== Reception ==
Upon its release, the novel received a mixed review in the Literary Gazette, which complained that the writing was "as a whole ... incongruous, forced, and extravagant". A writer for The Athenaeum positively reviewed the work, writing that the author "has made that region" – the southern tip of Africa and the Indian Ocean – "his own", although the writer complained about extraneous prefatory information that was included in the first edition. One article in Leigh Hunt's London Journal understands the novel as "defective in artifice of management, but very interesting on the whole", particularly for its descriptions of the rhinoceros, which the article describes as "a sort of hog-elephant, or mixture of elephant, hog, tapir, and cattle-mouth, cased in compartments of armour".

Literary scholar Ian Glenn understands Makanna as a captivity narrative that ultimately reads as a "conventional romance". He describes it as the "first substantial South African novel".
