= Kommandodrif Dam =

- Interactive map of Kommandodrif Dam
- Official name: Kommandodrif Dam
- Country: South Africa
- Location: Near Cradock, Eastern Cape
- Coordinates: 32°7′1″S 26°3′9″E
- Purpose: Irrigation
- Opening date: 1956
- Owner: Department of Water Affairs

Dam and spillways
- Type of dam: earth-fill/rock-fill
- Impounds: Tarka River
- Height: 38 m
- Length: 518 m

Reservoir
- Creates: Kommandodrif Dam Reservoir
- Total capacity: 58 900 000 m^{3}
- Catchment area: 6 331 km^{2}
- Surface area: 879 ha

Kommandodrif Dam is an earth-fill/rockfill type dam located on the Tarka River, near Cradock, Eastern Cape, South Africa. The dam has a capacity of 58,900,000 cubic metres (2.08×10^{9} cu ft), the wall is 38 metres (125 ft) high. The dam is included in the Commando Drift Nature Reserve and its main purpose is to serve for irrigation use. The hazard potential of the dam has been ranked high (3).

== History ==
The dam was completed in 1957 and the irrigation canal in 1958.

== See also ==
- List of reservoirs and dams in South Africa
- List of rivers of South Africa
