= Commando Drift Nature Reserve =

Nature reserve in Eastern Cape Province, South Africa

- Location within Eastern Cape
- Location: By Kommandodrif Dam
- Nearest city: Tarkastad
- Coordinates: 32°3′14″S 26°1′28″E
- Area: 5,827 ha (14,400 acres)
- Governing body: Eastern Cape Parks

Commando Drift Nature Reserve is a nature reserve in Eastern Cape Province, South Africa that is managed by Eastern Cape Parks, the park has an area of 5,827 hectares (14,400 acres). The Kommandodrif Dam is included in the reserve.

Endangered mountain zebras, black wildebeest, some species of antelope as well as over 200 species of birds can be found in the park.

== See also ==
- South African National Parks – Body responsible for managing South Africa's national parks
- List of protected areas of South Africa
