= Gqunukhwebe =

Chiefdom of the Xhosa Nation

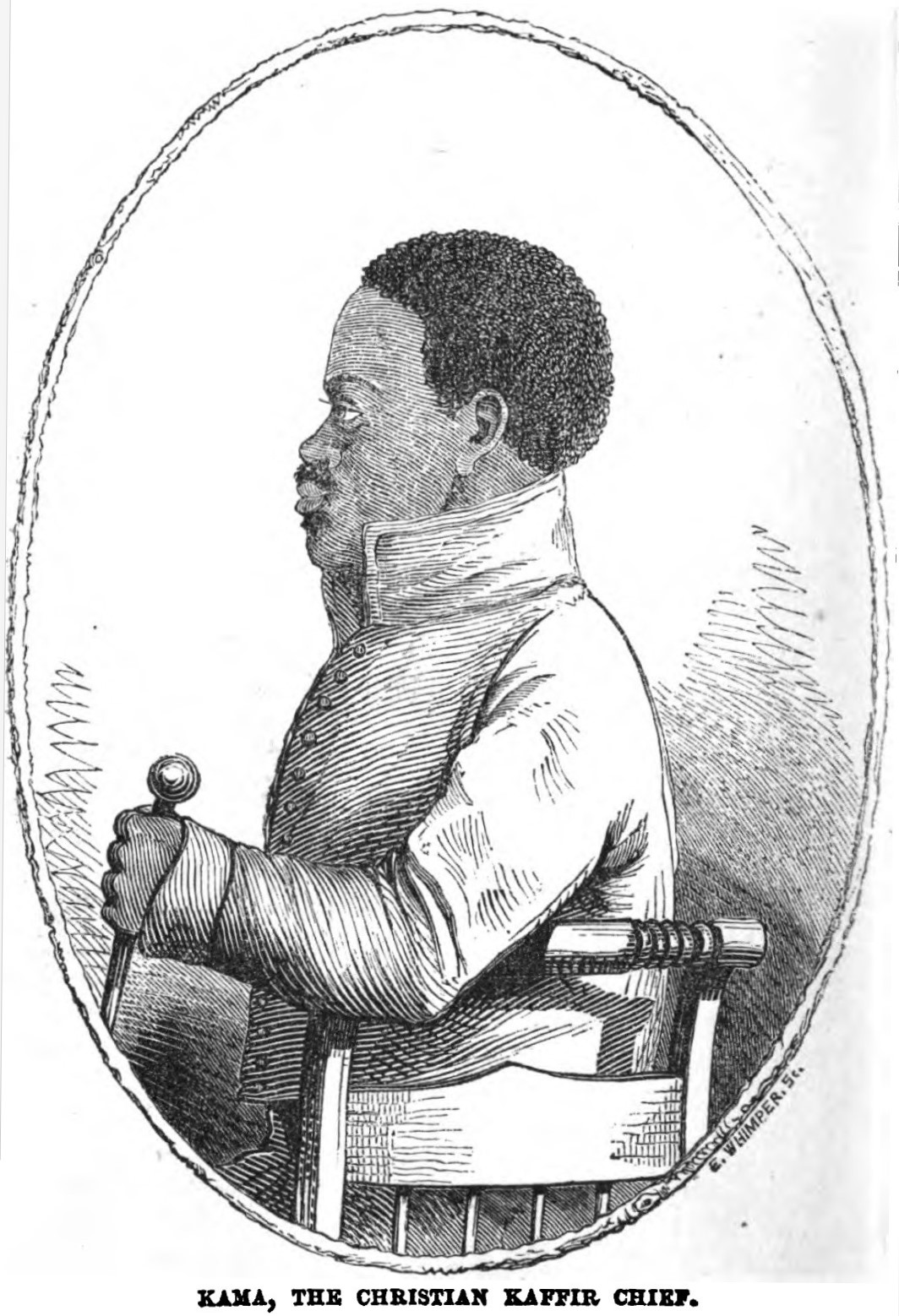
Kama, The Christian Kaffir Chief (July 1853, X, p.72)

AmaGqunukhwebe is a chiefdom of the Xhosa Nation that was created under the reign of King Tshiwo (1670–1702) of AmaXhosa, who was a grandfather to Gcaleka and Rharhabe. It consisted mostly of the Khoi chiefdoms (Gonaqua, Hoengeniqua, Inqua and others) that had been displaced by colonists and became incorporated into the Xhosa nation.

Khwane kaLungane, a counselor and warrior under King Tshiwo, was chosen to lead the new chiefdom. This marked the start of his Khwane dynasty, which would lead the chiefdom for decades.

The chiefdom spanned from the Buffalo River to Zwaartkops, but most of its territory was lost after the Xhosa Wars and was given to colony settlers (west of the Fish River) and the AmaMfengu people (between the Fish and Keiskamma rivers) by the colonial government.

The chiefdom gradually grew more homogeneous, until a divide occurred when two members of the leading family, Pato and Kama, split and settled different areas of the region. In addition, Kama converted to Christianity, which further alienated himself from the royal family. Later, Kama was recognized by the Cape Colony as the true leader of the chiefdom, possibly due to his religious conversion. This further eroded the influence of Pato and the ruling family of Gqunukhwebe.

Today, the chiefdom is effectively two entities led from two different centres, with one led by the Pato house and one led by the Kama house. Zolani ka-Ntlanganiso Phatho, a direct descendant of Pato, is currently next in line to be leader of the chiefdom.
