= Makhanda (prophet) =

Xhosa indigenous doctor

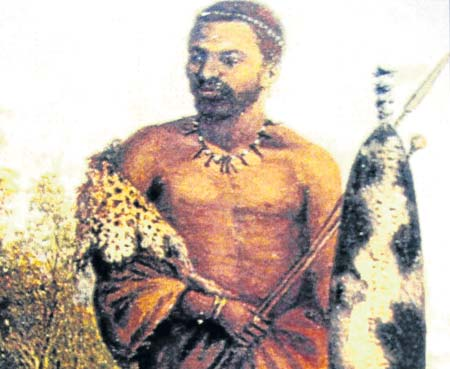
- Image of Chief Makhanda. Date of photo: May 16, 2016. Content provider: Thembani Onceya.
- Born: ~1780; Uitenhage, Xhosa Kingdom
- Died: 25 December 1820
- Occupation: War-doctor Prophet

Makhanda, also spelled Makana and also known as Nxele ("the left-handed"), (c. 1780 – 25 December 1820 (Note: Other sources date his death 9 August 1820)) was a Xhosa indigenous doctor. He served as a top advisor to Chief Ndlambe. During the Xhosa Wars, on 22 April 1819, he initiated an abortive assault on the town previously known as Grahamstown, in what was then the Cape Colony.

He was imprisoned on Robben Island. On 25 December 1820, Makhanda attempted to escape with thirty other prisoners, but drowned. Only four of the escapees survived the crossing.

== Life ==
Makhanda was born near the coast around 1780 in the Uitenhage area. His father was a Xhosa named Gwala of the Cwerha clan and his mother was a Khoikhoi of the Gqunukhwebe clan. After Makhanda's father died when he was a young boy, he was brought up by his mother strongly influenced by her village's Khoi traditions. His mother was a spiritual diviner and medicine woman. Makhanda was later recognised as an ‘'inyanga,'’ which seemed rooted in the early guidance of his mother and her traditions. The Xhosa also particularly held the Khoikhoi and San spiritual guides in high esteem. His mother took him and his siblings to the Great Fish River Valley, where they lived with his foster father Balala.

It is unclear when Makhanda encountered Christianity. Missionary Dr James van der Kemp had established a mission station in Bethelsdorp in 1799, and Makhanda may have met him. Makhanda advocated peace and denounced the use of magic after converting to Christianity.

During his days as an itinerant preacher, he was attacked by a gang of detractors. He was rescued by Qalanga, a councillor of Chief Ndlambe. Qalanga introduced Makhanda to the royal chief of the Rharhabe. Around 1812 Chief Ndlambe appointed Makhanda as an advisor and military doctor. As a royal appointee, Makhanda had discussions with the Rev. Vanderlingen, the chaplain at Grahamstown, and with missionary John Read, about theology and cosmology. During this period, Makhanda slowly increased his following and influence among the Xhosa. Up to 1816, he viewed missionaries as coworkers in the same cause. Missionary Read described Makhanda as “a stout and handsome man, who commands respect.”

In 1816, Makhanda's attitude towards missionaries changed. Having grown up in areas with Afrikaner farmers, he had firsthand knowledge of their mistreatment of khoikhoi people. To Makhanda, Christianity represented European culture. Makhanda and all of the amaXhosa were opposed to the encroachment of European settlers in the region, which had begun when Afrikaner trekboers from the Cape Colony started migrating into their lands, and culminated in the expulsion of 20,000 Xhosa from the Zuurveld in 1812. Makhanda viewed the emerging conflict between European and African world views as a contest between Thixo, the god of the whites, and Mdalidiphu (creator of the deep), the god of the Xhosas. He began to preach a fusion of these religions to reconcile them, leaning toward Xhosa beliefs.

== Battle of Grahamstown ==
In 1818 at the Battle of Amalinde, Makhanda fought alongside a combined force of the Xhosa against Chief Ngqika, who was considered to be selling out his people in return for personal gain as an ally of the British Cape Colony.

When a British-led force commanded by Colonel Thomas Brereton seized 23,000 head of stolen cattle from Ndlambe's people, Makhanda urged all the Xhosa to unite to try to drive British forces out of the land once and for all. Makhanda advised Ndlambe that the gods would be on their side if they chose to attack the British garrison in the settlement of Grahamstown, and promised that the British "bullets would turn to water".

Ndlambe took Makana's advice, and on 22 April 1819 Makana led a raid on Grahamstown in broad daylight with a force of about 6,000 men (some sources say 10,000 men), all under the overall command of Ndlambe's son Mdushane. They were accompanied by women and children, prepared to occupy Grahamstown after the battle. The British garrison of approximately 350 troops, along with a Khoikhoi group led by Jan Boesak was able to repulse the attack.

== Death and legacy ==
Defeated by superior British firepower and poor tactics by the amaNdlambe leadership, Makhanda surrendered. The British colonial government imprisoned him on Robben Island, but treated him with great respect, giving him private accommodation, food and furniture.

On 25 December 1820, Makhanda attempted to escape with thirty other prisoners, but drowned. Only four of the escapees survived the crossing. Since he had promised his people he would never abandon them, they continued to hope for his return for another 50 years before funeral rites were observed.

Makhanda is regarded as one of the first Africans to attempt a cultural synthesis of African and European beliefs. Dawn, the monthly journal of the uMkhonto we Sizwe, credited his actions with having inspired the multiculturalism of the African National Congress (ANC) upon its founding. Anti-apartheid political prisoners imprisoned on Robben Island, including Robert Mangaliso Sobukwe, later petitioned for the renaming of the island after Makana.

- The Makana Local Municipality was named after him.
- Makhanda, Eastern Cape, previously known as Grahamstown, was named after him in 2018.
- Makana F.A., a sporting body formed by political prisoners on Robben Island during the apartheid years, was named after him.
- The 1834 anonymous novel Makanna is inspired by him.

== South African Ship ==
- The SAS Makhanda was named after him.

== Sources ==
- Wells, Julia C. (2012). The Return of Makhanda: Exploring the Legend. University of KwaZulu-Natal Press. ISBN 978-1-86914-238-4.
- Wells, Julia C. (2007). Rebellion and Uproar: Makhanda and the Great Escape from Robben Island, 1820. University of South Africa Press. ISBN 978-1-86888-368-4.
- Pudi, Ranko; Satyo, Sizwe (1984). The illustrated life of Makhanda. Skotaville Publishers. ISBN 978-0-947009-04-5.
- Philip, John (1828). Researches in South Africa: Illustrating the Civil, Moral, and Religious Condition of the Native Tribes: Including Journals of the Author's Travels in the Interior. J. Duncan.

Irwin Pat Year (2019) The Battle of Graham's Town, 22 April 1819 [SA] Military History Journal 18(3)112-117 December SA ISSN 0026-4016
