= Battle of Grahamstown =

- Part of the Fifth Xhosa War
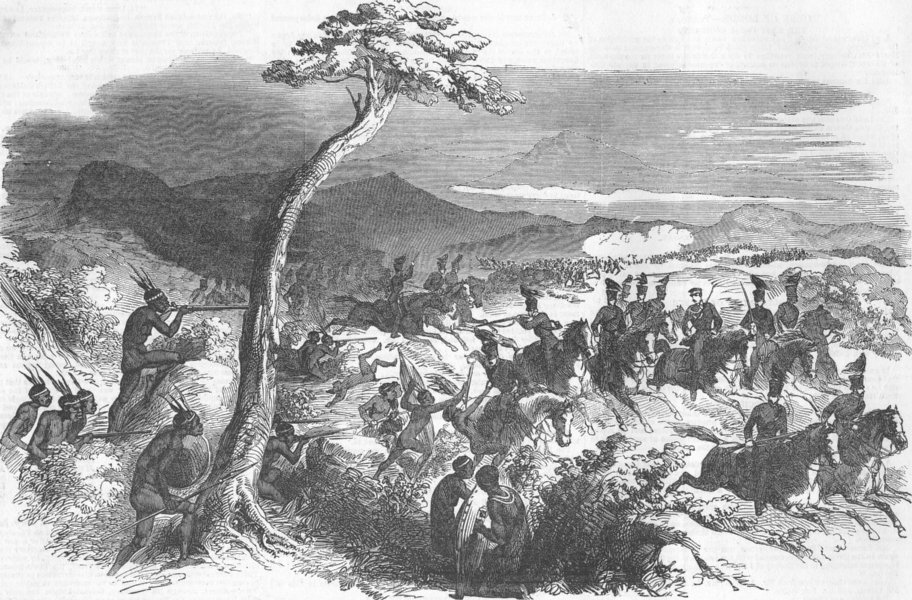
- This painting depicts the nine Xhosa Wars between the Xhosa and European settlers (1779-1)
Date	22 April 1819
Location	Makhanda, Eastern Cape, South Africa 33°18′36″S 26°31′36″E
Result	British victory

Belligerents
(United Kingdom) British Empire	Xhosa Kingdom

Commanders and leaders
Lieutenant Colonel Thomas Willshire	Nxele Mdushane ka Ndlambe

Strength
Approx. 350 British Army troops plus 130 KhoiKhoi	6,000+

Casualties and losses
3 British killed	c. 1,000 Xhosa killed

The Battle of Grahamstown took place on 22 April 1819, during the Fifth Xhosa War (1818-1819), at the frontier settlement of Grahamstown in what is now the Eastern Cape province of South Africa. The confrontation involved the defence of the town by the British garrison, aided by a group of Khoekhoe marksmen, from an attack by a large force of attacking Xhosa warriors.

== Background ==
When a British-led force commanded by Colonel Thomas Brereton seized 23,000 head of cattle from the AmaNdlambe, Makhanda, a Xhosa prophet, urged all the Xhosa to unite to try to drive British forces out of Xhosaland once and for all. Makhanda advised Ndlambe that the gods would be on their side if they chose to attack the British garrison in the settlement of Grahamstown, and promised that the British "bullets would turn to water".

== Battle ==
On 22 April 1819, a force of about 6,000 men (some sources say 10,000), under the command of Dushane, Ndlambe's warrior son, and led by Makhanda, launched a daylight attack against Grahamstown. They were accompanied by women and children, prepared to occupy Grahamstown after the battle.

The Xhosa had warned Colonel Willshire, the commanding officer, of their planned attack on the settlement.

During the course of the battle, the British were running low on ammunition. The Xhosas, however, were unable to overcome superior British firepower with their tactics, against the garrison of some 350 men. A Khoekhoe group, led by Jan Boesak, helped the garrison to repulse Mahkanda, who suffered the loss of 1,000 Xhosa.

== Aftermath ==
The war continued for several months thereafter, where the Xhosa's suffered heavy losses. Makhanda was highly sought after and pursued by the British forces who they saw as being the leading protagonist in causing the war. Makhanda later surrendered, under the belief it would bring an immediate end to the conflict, and was taken captive.

The battle site continues to be called "Egazini" ("Place of Blood"), and a monument was erected there for the fallen Xhosa in 2001. (Note: As of 2016, the Egazini monument has been vandalised and is in a bad state)
