= Great Fish River =

River in the Eastern Cape, South Africa

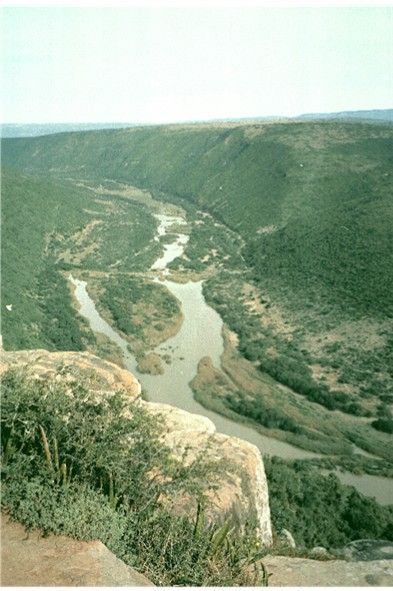
- The Great Fish River in the Eastern Cape in the Great Fish River Nature Reserve

- Location of the Great Fish River mouth

Location
- Country: South Africa
- Province: Eastern Cape

Physical characteristics
- Mouth: Indian Ocean
  - location: Near Seafield
  - coordinates: 33°29′34″S 27°07′52″E
  - elevation: 3 m (9.8 ft)
- Length: 730 km (450 mi)
- Basin size: 30,366 km^{2} (11,724 sq mi)

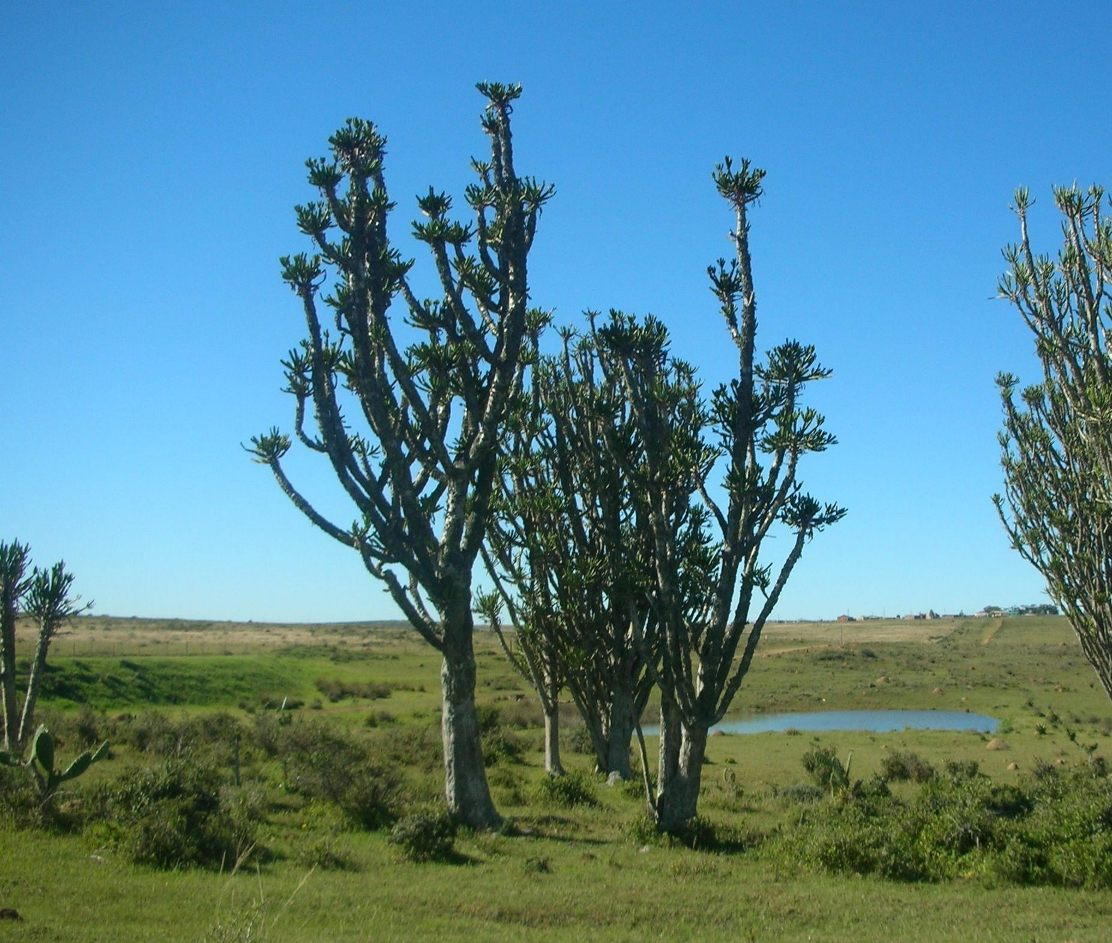
Landscape near the middle course of the Great Fish River

The Great Fish River (called great to distinguish it from the Namibian Fish River) (Afrikaans: Groot-Visrivier) is a river running 644 kilometres (400 mi) through the South African province of the Eastern Cape. The coastal area between Port Elizabeth and the Fish River mouth is known as the Sunshine Coast. The Great Fish River was originally named Rio do Infante, after João Infante, the captain of one of the caravels of Bartolomeu Dias. Infante visited the river in the late 1480s.

The name Great Fish is a misnomer, since it is a translation of the Dutch Groot Visch Rivier, which was the name of a tributary in the vicinity of Cradock, which at its confluence with the Little Fish (Klein Visch Rivier) forms what is properly called the (Eastern Cape) Fish River.

== Course ==
The Great Fish River originates east of Graaff-Reinet and runs through Cradock. Further south the Tarka River joins its left bank. Thence it makes a zig-zag turn to Cookhouse, from where it meanders down the escarpment east of Grahamstown before its final near-straight run to its estuary 8 km northeast of Seafield, into the Indian Ocean.

The river is generally permanent, having water all year round, although its headwaters rise in an arid region, and the natural flow can be sluggish in the dry season beyond the ebb and flow of the tidal reaches; now, water from the Orange River system can be used to keep up its flow in dry periods. The river is tidal for roughly 20 km.

Its main tributaries are the Groot Brak River, the Tarka River and the Kap River on the left side, and the Little Fish River (Afrikaans: Klein-Visrivier) on the right side. The Great Fish River is part of the Fish to Tsitsikama Water Management Area.

== Dams on the basin ==
- Egerton Dam
- Elandsdrift Dam

== Climate ==
At the river mouth, the climate is temperate with around 650 mm (26 in) of rainfall that falls mainly during spring and autumn. Mean temperatures range from 12 to 24 °C (54 to 75 °F) with extremes as low as 2 °C (36 °F) or as high as 40 °C (104 °F).

== Ecology ==
In the 1970s, a major water project brought Orange River water, via the Fish River, for agricultural and industrial use. The tunnel for this was a major engineering undertaking, with the intake at Oviston (an acronym, in Afrikaans, for Orange-Fish Tunnel). Oviston is on the shores of the Gariep Dam. A hydro-electric generating plant is placed at the Fish River egress, but is uneconomic and is not in use.

Mixing of waters from two watersheds has been environmentally disastrous—much of the Fish River ecosystem is now taken over by Orange River flora and fauna.

=== Flora ===
At the river mouth, there is Valley thicket, dune thicket, riparian vegetation and fynbos. The eastern Cape giant cycad, the red and the white milkwood are protected trees. Other significant species include the acacia, white pear, Karoo boer-bean, wild banana, dune poison bush, wild plum, coral tree and small knobwood.

=== Fauna ===
There is a small population of the endangered Eastern Province rocky (Sandelia bainsii) in the Kat River, part of the Great Fish river basin.

The Fish River mouth area supports several species of large and small mammals including five antelope species, bushpigs, various rodent species including mongoose, hyrax, hares, rats and mice, bats, and the shy Southern African wildcat, the small spotted genet, striped polecat and the Cape porcupine. The most commonly viewed wild mammal is the vervet monkey, which has been known to grab food under the nose of unsuspecting guests at the Fish River Sun Resort. There are over 135 species of marine and terrestrial birds found along the river including the colourful Knysna lourie, giant kingfisher and the fish eagle. There are 26 species of snakes, of which only five are venomous.

== History ==
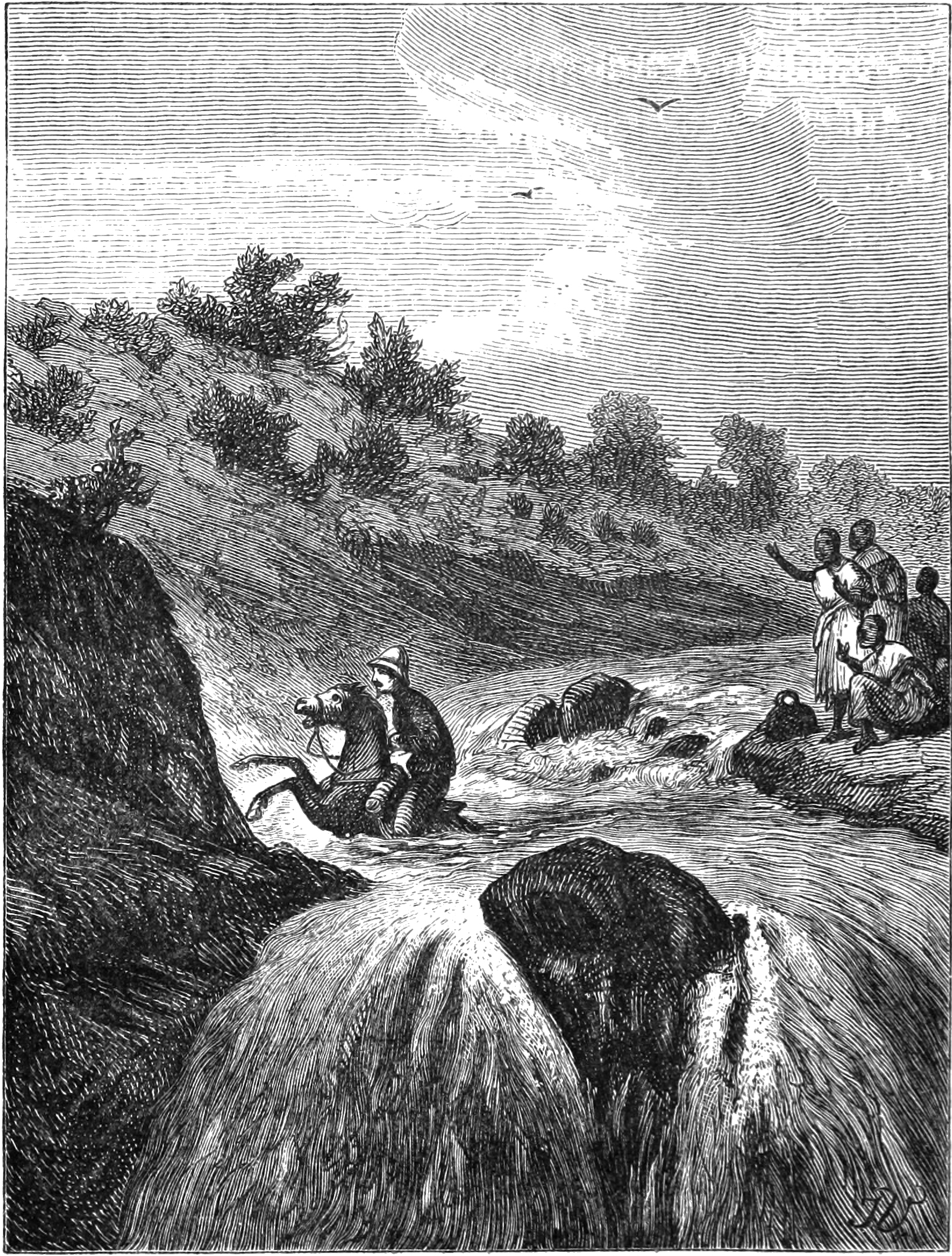
Explorer Emil Holub fording the flooded Great Fish River near Cradock (1879)

During the 19th century, the river formed the border of the Cape Colony and was hotly contested during the Xhosa Wars of 1779 to 1878 between the Xhosa nation on the one side and the Afrikaner colonists and the British Empire on the other, and in 1835, the Fingo people were permitted to settle on the river's banks. During apartheid, the lower reaches formed the western boundary of the nominally independent Ciskei homeland. Between 1846 and 1847, the Fish River mouth area became a hive of activity during the War of the Axe, one of several frontier wars at the time between the Xhosa nation and Britain. A ferry was constructed at the Fish River to link the Cape Colony (western side of the river) with Waterloo Bay (the small bay near the mouth of Old Woman's River which now flows through the Fish River Sun resort). Waterloo Bay, named after the first ship which unloaded cargo in the bay, served as a landing place for soldiers and supplies in the war. Several ships wrecked along the Fish River coast during these years. The following are notable historical sites at the Fish River mouth, mostly encompassed within the Fish River Sun Resort premises which the establishment has endeavoured to protect:

=== Maitland Military Camp ===
The main military camp was on the eastern bank of the Old Woman's River, called Cape Maitland, in honour of Sir Peregrine Maitland, Governor of the Cape Colony. The name was later changed to Fort Albert in honour of Queen Victoria's husband. The camp consisted of huts and tents surrounded by an earthwork and was abandoned at the end of the war. The camp site was ‘rediscovered’ when large quantities of artifacts were unearthed during the construction of the Fish River Sun golf course.

=== Broxholm Cottage ===
A certain Sergeant C. Broxholm is rumoured to have built the only structure that survived the war, located on the eastern side of the river. Built in 1846, he sold the building a year later to Mr. J. Kidd of the Wesleyan Missionary Society who hoped to undertake missionary work at Waterloo Bay.

=== Soldier’s Cemetery ===
Some of the soldiers that died during the occupation of Waterloo Bay were buried in a small cemetery near the eastern bank of the Old Woman's River. The graves were not marked but it is believed that members of the 6th and 45th regiments and Cape Levy were buried there. A clearing among the dune scrub marks the site on the Fish River Sun Resort property.

=== Civilian camp ===
A large civilian camp with the accompanying trading stores and inns which followed the military activities was apparently situated on the western side of the Old Woman's River. All historical remains are currently covered by the golf playing surface.

=== Shipwrecks ===
The remains of the vessels Catherine and Justina can still be seen by divers. The ships were wrecked in the 1840s and are located within 1 km of the mouth of the Fish River.

== Economy ==
=== Recreation ===
- Despite its name, fishing that takes place along its (mainly lower) reaches is primarily recreational.
- Annually, the Fish River Canoe Marathon, a popular canoeing event takes place over two days from Grassridge Dam to Cradock.
- Diving in the area of the river's mouth is quite an experience, thanks to the numerous shipwrecks which can be found: the SS Cariboo, the SS Kilbrennan and the Waterloo, to name a few.

=== Fish River Sun Hotel and Country Club Resort ===
The Fish River Sun Hotel and Country Club Resort is a Sun International resort destination at the mouth of the Fish River on the south-eastern coastline of South Africa. The Fish River Sun opened its doors in March 1989 as a hotel and casino. The 184,000 hectare property on the eastern banks of the Fish River fell within the then Ciskei region, a former Bantustan homeland during the apartheid administration. The hotel, casino and golf course continued to be a popular and successful tourism attraction in the region, mostly due to the casino, as licenses are awarded sparingly in South Africa. The resort establishment suffered a huge knock when its casino license was not extended after its ten-year period, ending in 1999. The accommodation format was converted from a hotel to a vacation club functioning on a timeshare basis. The Eastern Cape Gambling Board granted another casino license in nearby Port Elizabeth, also operated by Sun International, in the Boardwalk Casino and Entertainment World Complex. As part of the license bid, the Boardwalk agreed to supplement the costs of maintaining the Fish River Sun as part of its obligation to rural development in the province. Activities include swimming, guided nature walks, golf, dune boarding, canoeing, fishing, mini-golf, and spa treatments.

There is a golf course designed by Gary Player and rated in the top 30 golf courses in South Africa. Old Woman's River runs through the course. The course has hosted some large events including the Africa Open in 2008.

== Great Fish Point ==
Great Fish Point is a lighthouse situated near the mouth of the Great Fish River, about 25 km from the coastal holiday resort of Port Alfred.

Before the lighthouse was built in 1898, two ship's lamps exhibiting fixed green lights were erected on a flagstaff at Port Alfred, but these lights later proved to be inadequate. The clockwork system which used to drive the lens is still intact and on display.

Although the lighthouse itself is only 9 metres (30 ft) high, it is situated 76 metres (249 ft) above sea level.

== See also ==
- List of rivers of South Africa
- List of estuaries of South Africa
