= John Bennie (missionary) =

Scottish Presbyterian minister

The Reverend John Bennie
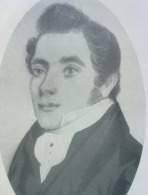
- John Bennie prior to leaving for the Cape Colony in 1821.
- Born: 26 October 1796; Glasgow, Scotland
- Died: 9 February 1869 (aged 72); Rosmead, Cape Colony,
- Occupations: Cleric; Linguist; Author
- Spouse: Margaretha Magdalena Marè
- Parent(s): James Bennie and Margaret Scott
- Religion: Christian (Church of Scotland / Dutch Reformed Church)
- Ordained: 1831

John Bennie (1796–1869) was a Presbyterian minister, missionary, and early Xhosa linguist. In 1816 he became associated with the Glasgow Missionary Society while still in Scotland and sailed to South Africa on the ship Woodlark as a catechist where he carried out his missionary work in the Ciskei.

== Missionary work ==
John Bennie is one of the founding fathers of the Lovedale Mission Station, which was established among the Ngqika. Bennie resigned from his post at Lovedale due to the deteriorating health of his wife. He went on to establish a mission church for the Dutch Reformed Church in Middelburg.

In 1843, John Bennie was transferred by the Glasgow Missionary Society to the Burnshill Mission Station in Burnshill of British Kaffraria. The station had been established by the society in 1831.

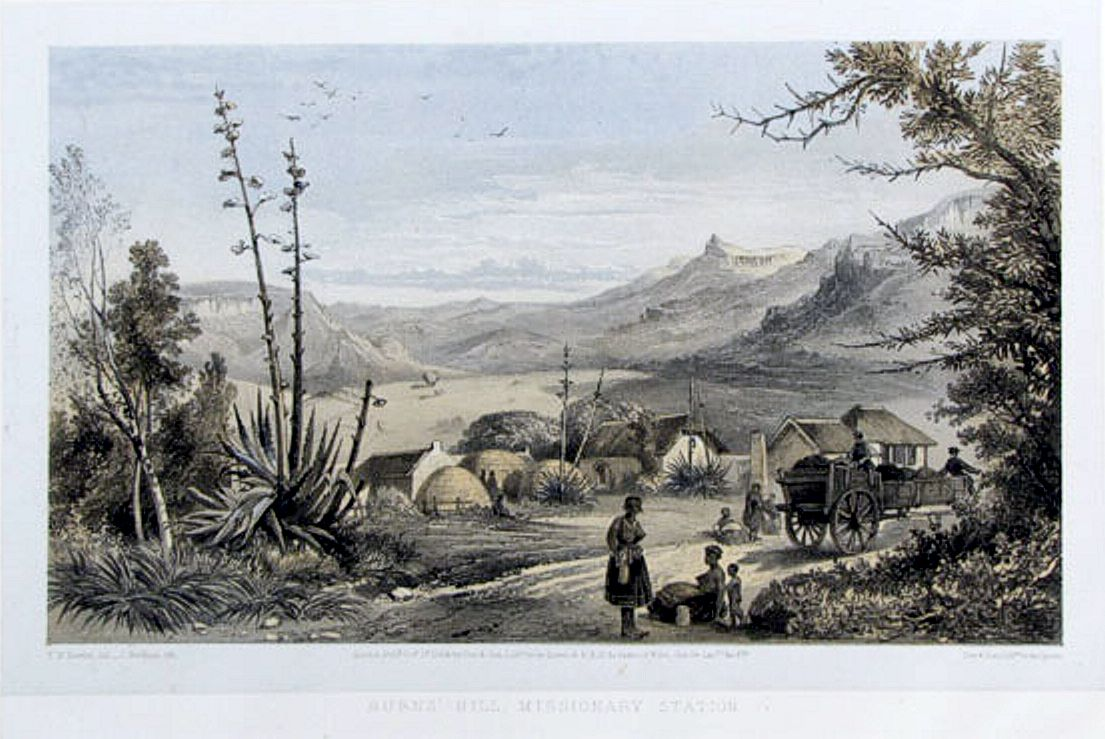
Burns' Hill Mission Station on the Keiskamma River

It was while Bennie was posted at Burnshill that he made the journey described in his book, An account of a journey into Transorangia and the Potchefstroom-Winburg Trekker Republic in 1843; edited by D. Williams, into the interior of South Africa to administer to the spiritual needs of the voortrekkers with his father-in-law and brother-in-law.

== Private life ==
John Bennie was the son of James Bennie, a metal smith from Glasgow, Scotland and Margaret Bennie (née Scott). Six years after arriving in South Africa, John Bennie married Margaretha Magdalena Marè (1801–1868) from Graaf Reinet. She was an Afrikaner of Huguenot descent. This fact was most probably why he got involved with the Dutch Reformed Church. They had nine children together and also adopted another. Four of his children were known to have been educated at Lovedale and his one son, John Angell became the boarding master and acting principal of the school after first teaching at another mission station for two years. Bennie died on 9 February 1869 at the age of 72.

== Work on the Xhosa language ==
After learning Dutch, John Bennie went about learning Xhosa, his aim being, in his words: “reducing to form and rule this language which hitherto floated in the wind”.

When John Ross (another missionary) brought a printing press to Tyhume in December 1823, John Bennie had already produced his transcription of the Xhosa language. The first sheets of printed Xhosa were produced on 19 December 1823. The oldest piece of printed continuous Xhosa known is Bennie's one-page Xhosa Reading sheet printed in 1823.

On 18 November 1824 Bennie announced to his Presbytery that he was going to compile an extended list of vocabulary and grammar dealing mainly with pronunciation of the Xhosa language. Through the Lovedale Mission Press he was able to publish a number of vocabulary lists as well as publications on grammar dealing with pronunciation. The second edition of Kropf's dictionary of Xhosa of 1915 incorporated into it Bennie's manuscript portions of a "Kafir-English" (Xhosa-English) Dictionary.

John Bennie also was involved in translating and transcribing the oral narrative of a Xhosa convert from the Tyhume mission, known as Noyi or, after baptism, Robert Balfour. The narrative was called Iziqwenge zembali yamaXhosa ("fragments of Xhosa history"). Only part of this narrative was printed and was never published as a whole, but was still an important attempt at recording Xhosa history. It would have been the first secular Xhosa publication.

== Recognition ==
Izibongo is a praise poem written in Xhosa. It was produced in 1985 by the Thembu poet (imbongi) D. L. P. Yali-Manisi at a university conference in Durban. Part of it praises and recognises John Bennie for his contribution to the written language.

=== Xhosa original of Izibongo ===
“Siyabulela thina basemaXhoseni bububhanxa
Ngokufika kweento zooRose nezooBheni
Ukuz’ amaXhos’ avulek’ ingqondo
Kulo mhla yaqal’ ukubhalwa le ntetho
Intethw’ engqongqotho yasemaXhoseni”

=== English translation of Izibongo ===
We Xhosa are ever grateful
that men like Ross and Bennie
came to ignite the mind of the Xhosa by first transcribing the language,
the peerless language of the Xhosa

== See also ==
- Xhosa
