= Emma Sandile =

- Resting place: Eastern Cape
- Spouse: Chief Stokwe Ndlela
- Father: Sandile kaNgqika

Emma Sandile (c. 1842–1892), also known as Princess Emma, was the daughter of the Rharhabe Xhosa King Sandile kaNgqika. She was educated by the British in the Cape Colony, and later became a landowner possibly the first black woman to hold a land title in South Africa.

== Biography ==
The Ngqika King Sandile kaNgqika sent his daughter Emma and his two sons to Cape Town to be educated, although they were referred to by Anglican bishop Robert Gray (bishop of Cape Town) as "hostages for the peace and prosperity of their country". At the time, the Xhosa people, of which the Ngqika were a part, had fought with the British Empire and the Cape Colony in the Xhosa Wars over land rights. The children first stayed with Gray and his wife, then attended Zonnebloem College. The British hoped that both Emma and her older brother Gonya, who was Sandile's heir, would prove to be influencers to their people.

She took to writing about her experiences, the first known writing in English by a Xhosa woman. She arrived at the College at the age of 16, alongside two other girls as company and 18 boys. Initially there was no specific education for the girls, who took to cooking and sewing. After a year a teacher was hired for them, and Emma was baptised six months after. She sought to return to the Xhosa for brief periods, but these were turned down as there were concerns by George Grey, Governor of the Cape Colony, that she would be married to a non-Christian. However, Grey did grant her ownership of a farm. She may have been the first black woman in Southern Africa to have land registered in her name.

There was then a struggle between her father, who wished for her to marry a neighbouring Chief and Bishop Melusi Gray. Eventually there was agreement that she would be betrothed to Ngangelizwe of Thembuland as he was a Chief who was interested in Christianity. The marriage was called off, after disagreements about both the marriage and wedding practices, and because Ngangelizwe wished to use a Wesleyan minister instead of an Anglican priest. Emma became a teacher, at a mission in Grahamstown and became the second wife of Chief Stokwe Ndlela, a chief of the AmaQwathi. Although she was the second wife, because of her lineage, she was also his primary wife. However, he was killed by the British during a revolt in 1881, and the Thembu claimed that she had helped to cause this.

Her husband Chief Stokwe Ndlela left her further land in Cala Eastern Cape, and Emma successfully petitioned the land commission to receive the land in her name. The farm was in Seplan ( Cala) in the south east of modern South Africa. Emma died in 1892, leaving the land to her four daughters and one son, none of which were brought up Christian. There continued to be legal disputes about the land owned by her into the 1980s. the current leader of the Royal Family of Chief Stokwe is Chief Somidaka Stokwe and his secretary is Thulani Stokwe and currently are fighting for the land that was dispossessed from the Royal Family of AmaQwathi .
