= Gaika =

Gaika may refer to:

- 1358 Gaika
- Gaika people
- Gaika (musician)
