= History of the Cape Colony from 1806 to 1870 =

The history of the Cape Colony from 1806 to 1870 spans the period of the history of the Cape Colony during the Cape Frontier Wars, which lasted from 1779 to 1879. The wars were fought between the European colonists and the native Xhosa who, defending their land, fought against European rule.

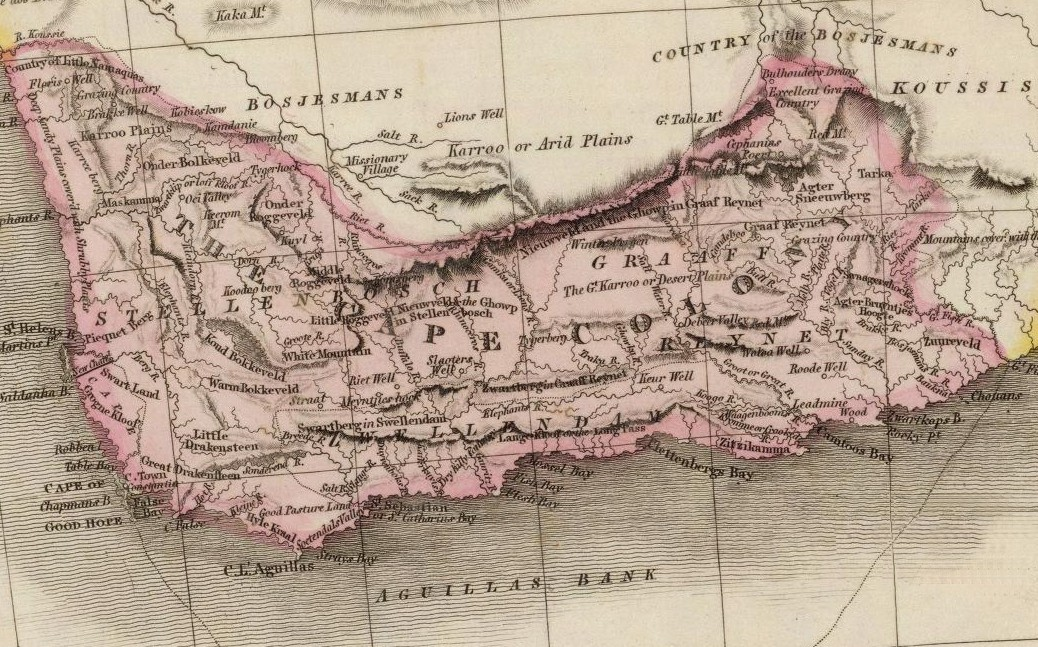
Map of the Cape Colony in 1809

The Cape Colony was the first European colony in South Africa, which was initially controlled by the Dutch but subsequently invaded and taken over by the British. After war broke out again, a British force was sent once more to the Cape. After a battle in January 1806 on the shores of Table Bay, the Dutch garrison of Cape Castle surrendered to the British under Sir David Baird, and in 1814, the colony was ceded outright by the Netherlands to the British crown. At that time, the colony extended to the mountains in front of the vast central plateau, then called "Bushmansland", and had an area of about 194,000 square kilometres and a population of some 60,000, of whom 27,000 were white, 17,000 free Khoikhoi, and the rest slaves. These slaves were mostly people brought in from other parts of Africa and Malays.

== First and second frontier wars ==
The first of several wars with the Xhosa had already been fought by the time that the Cape Colony had been ceded to the United Kingdom. The Xhosa that crossed the colonial frontier had been expelled from the district between the Sundays River and Great Fish River known as the Zuurveld, which became a neutral ground of sorts. For some time before 1811, the Xhosa had taken possession of the neutral ground and attacked the colonists. In order to expel them from the Zuurveld, Colonel John Graham took the area with a mixed-race army in December 1811, and eventually the Xhosa were forced to fall back beyond the Fish River. On the site of Colonel Graham’s headquarters arose a town bearing his name: Graham's Town, subsequently becoming Grahamstown.

A difficulty between the Cape Colony government and the Xhosa arose in 1819, the immediate cause of which was an attempt by the colonial authorities to enforce the restitution of some stolen cattle. On 22 April 1819, led by a prophet-chief named Makana, they attacked Graham’s Town, then held by a handful of white troops. Upon the arrival of reinforcements, the Xhosa troops retreated. It was then agreed that the land between the Fish and the Keiskamma rivers should be neutral territory.

== 1820 Settlers ==
The war of 1817–1819 led to the first wave of immigration of British settlers of any considerable scale, an event with far-reaching consequences. The then-governor, Lord Charles Somerset, whose treaty arrangements with the Xhosa chiefs had proved untenable, wished to buffer the Cape from contact with the Xhosa by settling white colonists in the border region. In 1820, upon the advice of Lord Somerset, Parliament voted to spend £50,000 (£4,178,134 today) to promote migration to the Cape, encouraging 4,000 British people to migrate to the buffer area. These immigrants, now known as the 1820 Settlers, settled in an area they called Albany and grew settlements in Port Elizabeth and Grahamstown. The settlers were intended primarily to secure the frontier, as well as a means for the British government to relieve unemployment in Britain. However, the scheme had further implications: the settlers retained their loyalty to Britain, and in the course of time, formed a counterpoint to the Dutch colonists.

This migration also introduced the English language to the Cape. English language ordinances were issued for the first time in 1825, and in 1827, the use of English was extended to judicial proceedings. Dutch was not, however, ousted, and the colonists became largely bilingual.

Over the ensuing decades, there was considerable political tension between the eastern and the western halves of the Cape Colony. The Eastern Cape, from its major port and urban centre Port Elizabeth, resented being ruled from Cape Town in the Western Cape, and frequently agitated to become a separate colony. These separatist tensions did not completely die down until the 1870s, when Prime Minister John Molteno restructured the Cape administration to meet the major concerns of the eastern colonists and, in the Constitutional Amendment Bill of 1873, abolished the last formal distinctions.

== Dutch hostility to British rule ==
Although the colony was prosperous, many Dutch farmers were as dissatisfied with British rule as they had been with that of the Dutch East India Company, though their grievances were not the same. In 1792, Moravian missions had been established for the benefit of the Khoikhoi, and in 1799, the London Missionary Society began to try to convert both the Khoikhoi and the Xhosa. The championship of Khoikhoi grievances by the missionaries caused much dissatisfaction among the majority of the colonists, whose conservative views temporarily prevailed, for in 1812, an ordinance was issued which gave magistrates the power to bind Khoikhoi children as apprentices under conditions little different from those of slavery. In the meantime, the movement for the abolition of slavery was gaining strength in England, and the missionaries appealed at length, from the colonists to Britain.

An incident which occurred from 1815 to 1816 did much to make the Dutch frontiersmen permanently hostile to the British. A farmer named Bezuidenhout refused to obey a summons issued to him after a complaint from Khoikhoi was registered. He fired on the party sent to arrest him, and was killed by the return fire. This caused a miniature rebellion, and in its suppression five ringleaders were publicly hanged by the British at Slagter's Nek where they had originally sworn to expel "the English tyrants". The resentment caused by the hanging of these men was deepened by the circumstances of the execution, for the scaffold on which the rebels simultaneously were hanged broke from their united weight and the men were hanged one by one afterwards. The deeply religious Dutch frontiersmen believed the collapsing scaffold to be an act of God. An ordinance passed in 1827 abolished the old Dutch landdrost and heemraden courts, instead substituting resident magistrates. The ordinance further stipulated that all legal proceedings be henceforth conducted in English.

A subsequent ordinance in 1828 granted equal rights with white people to the Khoikhoi and other free African people in the Cape. Another ordinance in 1830 imposed heavy penalties for harsh treatment of slaves, and finally the emancipation of slaves was proclaimed in 1834. Each of these ordinances drew further ire from the Dutch farmers towards the Cape government. Moreover, the inadequate compensation awarded to slave-owners, and the suspicions engendered by the method of payment, caused much resentment, and in 1835 the trend where farmers trekked into unknown country in order to escape from a disliked government recommenced. Emigration beyond the colonial border had in fact been continuous for 150 years, but it now took on larger proportions.

== Third cape frontier war (1834–1836) ==
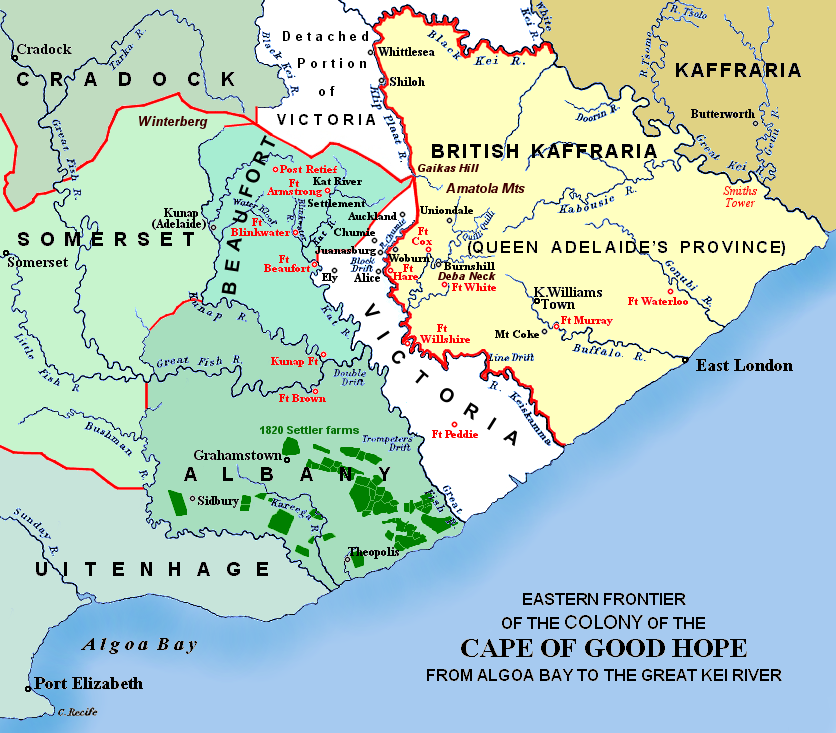
The Eastern Frontier, ca 1835

On the eastern border, further trouble arose between the government and the Xhosa, towards whom the policy of the Cape government was marked by much vacillation. On 11 December 1834, a government commando party killed a Xhosa chief of high rank, incensing the Xhosa: an army of 10,000 men, led by Maqoma, a brother of the chief who had been killed, swept across the frontier, pillaged and burned the homesteads and killed all who resisted. Among the worst sufferers was a colony of freed Khoikhoi who, in 1829, had been settled in the Kat River valley by the British authorities. There were few available soldiers in the colony, but the governor, Sir Benjamin d'Urban acted quickly and all available forces were mustered under Colonel Sir Harry Smith, who reached Graham's Town on 6 January 1835, six days after news of the violence had reached Cape Town. The British fought the Xhosa warriors for nine months until hostilities were ended on 17 September 1836 with the signing of a new peace treaty, by which all the country as far as the River Kei was acknowledged to be British, and its inhabitants declared British subjects. A site for the seat of government was selected and named King William's Town.

== Great Trek (1836–1840) ==
The British government did not approve of the actions of Sir Benjamin d'Urban, and the British Secretary for the Colonies, Lord Glenelg, declared in a letter to the King that "the great evil of the Cape Colony consists in its magnitude" and demanded that the boundary be moved back to the Fish River. He also eventually had d'Urban dismissed from office in 1837. Lord Glenelg's dispatch of 26 December stated: "The Kaffirs had an ample justification for war; they had to resent, and endeavoured justly, though impotently, to avenge a series of encroachments." This attitude towards the Xhosa was one of the many reasons given by the Voortrekkers for leaving the Cape Colony. The Great Trek, as it is called, lasted from 1836 to 1840. The trekkers (Boers), numbering around 7,000, founded communities with a republican form of government beyond the Orange and Vaal rivers, and in Natal, where they had been preceded, however, by British emigrants. From this time on, Cape Colony ceased to be the only European community in South Africa, though it was the most predominant for many years.

Considerable trouble was caused by the emigrant Boers on either side of the Orange River, where the Boers, the Basothos, other native tribes, Bushmen, and Griquas fought for superiority, while the Cape government endeavoured to protect the rights of the native Africans. On the advice of the missionaries, who exercised great influence on all non-Dutch people, a number of the "native states" were recognised and subsidised by the Cape government with the objective of creating peace on the northern frontier. The first "Treaty States" to be recognised was Griqualand West of the Griqua people. Subsequent states were recognised between 1843 and 1844. While the northern frontier became more secure, the state of the eastern frontier was deplorable, with the government either unable or unwilling to settle disputes between Xhosa and Cape farmers.

Elsewhere, however, the colony was making progress. The change from slave to free labour proved to be advantageous to the farmers in the western provinces. An efficient education system, owing its inception to Sir John Herschel, an astronomer who lived in Cape Colony from 1834 to 1838, was adopted. Road Boards were established and proved to be very effective in constructing new roads. A new stable industry, sheep-raising, was added to the original set of wheat-growing, cattle rearing, and wine making. By 1846, wool became the country's most valuable export. A legislative council was established in 1835, giving the colonists a share in the government.

== War of the Axe (1846) ==
Another war with the Xhosa, known as the War of the Axe or Amatola War, broke out in 1846, when a Khoikhoi escort who had been manacled to a Xhosa thief was murdered while transporting the man to Graham's Town to be tried for stealing an axe. A party of Xhosa attacked and killed the escort. The surrender of the murderer was refused, and war was declared in March 1846. The Ngqikas were the chief tribe engaged in the war, assisted by the Ndlambe and Thembu. The Xhosa were defeated on 7 June 1846 by General Somerset on the Gwangu, a few miles from Fort Peddie. However, the war continued until Sandile, the chief of the Ngqika, surrendered. Other chiefs gradually followed this action, and by the end of 1847 the violence died down after 21 months of fighting.

== Extension of British sovereignty (1847) ==
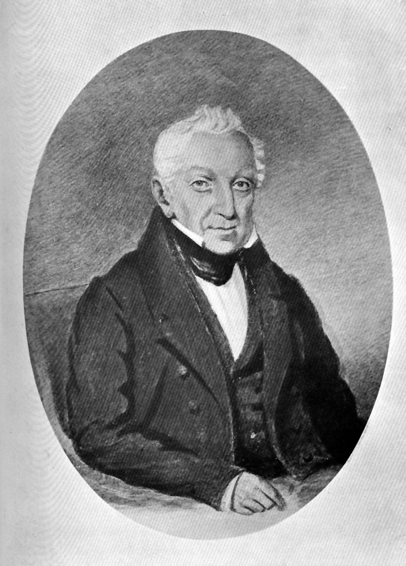
Sir Harry Smith

In December 1847, or what was to be the last month of the War of the Axe, Sir Harry Smith reached Cape Town by boat to become the new governor of the colony.

=== Expansion of the Cape Colony ===
He reversed Glenelg's policy soon after arrival, and embarked on a policy of unilateral conquest of neighbouring lands. A proclamation he issued on 17 December 1847 extended the borders of the colony northwards to the Orange River and eastward to the Keiskamma River, roughly doubling the area of the Cape Colony.

This was done without consulting the British Government, or the local Boers and African states which now found themselves annexed. However, his expansionist policy against the neighbouring Xhosa did win him the local support of the extremist colonists of the Eastern Cape frontier.

=== Establishment of British Kaffraria ===
A few days later, at a meeting of the Xhosa chiefs on 23 December 1847, Sir Harry announced the annexation of the land between the Keiskamma and the Kei Rivers to the British crown, thus re-absorbing the territory that had been given up by Lord Glenelg. The land was not, however, incorporated into the Cape Colony, but instead made a crown dependency under the name of British Kaffraria.

The Xhosa did not initially offer violent resistance against this annexation, and they were mainly left alone as the governor had other serious matters to contend with, including the assertion of British authority over the Boers beyond the Orange River, and the establishment of amicable relations with the Transvaal Boers.

== Convict agitation and granting of a constitution (1848–1853) ==
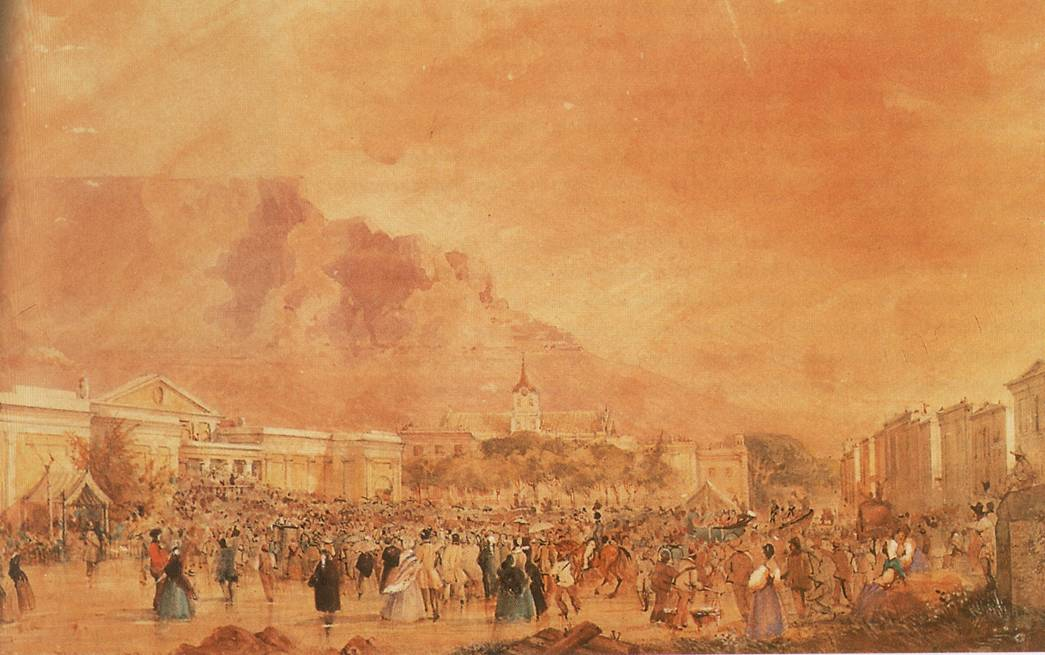
Speeches and rally against the establishment of a penal colony at the Cape Colony.

A crisis arose in the colony over a proposal to make the Cape Colony a convict station. A circular written in 1848 by Henry Grey, 3rd Earl Grey, then colonial secretary, was sent to the governor of the Cape, as well as other colonial governors, asking them to ascertain the feelings of the colonists regarding the reception of a certain class of convicts. The Earl intended initially to send Irish peasants who had been driven to crime by the Great Famine of 1845 to South Africa. Sir Harry Smith was very much aware of his unpopularity in the Colonial Office due to his unilateral and expensive colonisation of neighbouring territories. Smith saw a way of winning favour in London, by allowing the Cape to be used as a convict station.

However Smith did not consult the local population on this plan for the Cape which prided itself on being a colony of "free settlement", so when the first convict ship arrived there was uproar among the locals and triggering the convict crisis. Local people, who were already upset about Smith's perceived dictatorial rule, established an anti-convict association whose members bound themselves to cease from all interaction of any kind with persons in any way associated "with the landing, supplying or employing convicts".

The boat, a vessel named the Neptune, had 289 convicts on board, among whom was the famous Irish rebel John Mitchel and his colleagues. Sir Harry Smith had the support of the extremist settlers of the Eastern Cape, whose expansion onto Xhosa lands he had facilitated, but he could not govern without the consent of the powerful Cape Town elite, or his Legislative Council from which they had resigned en masse. Confronted with public resistance, he agreed not to allow the convicts to land when the Neptune arrived in Simon's Bay on 19 September 1849, but to keep them on board the ship until he received orders to send them elsewhere. When the home government became aware of the state of affairs, orders were sent directing the Neptune to proceed to Tasmania, and it did so after staying in Simon’s Bay for five months.

The agitation did not fade away without further achievements, as it had thrown up a generation of local leaders who believed that Britain did not understand or sympathise with local issues. The momentum of this, South Africa's first mass-movement, continued as a drive to obtain a free, representative government for the colony. The British government granted this concession, which had been previously promised by Lord Grey, and a constitution was established in 1854 of almost unprecedented liberality. The first Cape Parliament was elected in the same year.

== Eighth frontier war (1850–1853) ==
The anti-convict move had scarcely ended when the colony was once again involved in a war. The Xhosa bitterly resented Sir Harry Smith's recent annexation of their lands, and had secretly been preparing to renew their struggle ever since the last war. Sir Harry Smith, informed of the increasing Xhosa mobilisation, went to the border region and summoned Sandile and the other chiefs for a meeting. Sandile refused to attend the meeting, after which the governor declared him deposed from his chieftainship at an assembly of other chiefs in October 1850, and appointed an English magistrate named Mr Brownlee to be temporary chief of the Ngqika tribe. It seems that the governor believed that he would be able to prevent a war and that Sandile could be arrested without armed resistance. Colonel George Mackinnon, who had been sent out with a small army with the goal of arresting the chief, was attacked in a narrow gorge on 24 December 1850 by a large number of Xhosa gunmen. After some casualties, Mackinnon's men were driven back under heavy fire. This minor shoot-out prompted a general rising among the whole Ngqika tribe. Settlers in military villages that had been established along the border, were caught in a surprise attack after they had gathered to celebrate Christmas Day. Many of them were killed, and their houses set on fire.

Other setbacks followed in quick succession. The greater part of the Xhosa police deserted, many of them leaving with their arms. Emboldened by their initial success, a large and powerful contingent of Xhosa troops surrounded and attacked Fort Cox, where the governor was stationed with a small number of soldiers. More than one unsuccessful attempt was made to kill Sir Harry, and he began to explore ways to escape. Eventually, at the head of 150 mounted riflemen, accompanied by Colonel Mackinnon, he fought his way out of the fort, and rode to King William’s Town through heavy Xhosa fire – a distance of 12 miles (19 km).

Meanwhile, a new threat to the Cape arose. Some 900 of the Kat river Khoikhoi, who had in former wars been firm allies of the British, joined their former enemies: the Xhosa. They were not without justification. They complained that while serving as soldiers in former wars – the Cape Mounted Rifles consisted largely of Khoikhois – they had not received the same treatment as others serving in defence of the colony, that they got no compensation for the losses they had sustained, and that they were in various ways made to feel they were a wronged and injured race. A secret alliance was formed with the Xhosa to take up arms in order to remove the Europeans and establish a Khoikhoi republic. Within a fortnight of the attack on Colonel Mackinnon, the Kat river Khoikhoi were also in arms. Their revolt was followed by that of the Khoikhoi at other missionary stations, and some of the Khoikhoi of the Cape Mounted Rifles followed their example, including some of the very men who had escorted the governor from Fort Cox. But many of the Khoikhoi remained loyal, and the Fingo likewise sided with the Cape government.

After the confusion caused by the surprise attack had subsided, Sir Harry Smith and his force turned the tide of war against the Xhosa. The Amatola Mountains were stormed, and Sarhili, the highest ranking chief, who had been secretly assisting the Ngqika all along, was harshly punished. In April 1852, Sir Harry Smith was recalled by Earl Grey, who accused him – unjustly, in the opinion of the Duke of Wellington – of a want of energy and judgement in conducting the war; he was succeeded by Lieutenant-General Cathcart. Sarhili was again attacked and forced to submit. The Amatolas were then cleared of Xhosa militia, and small forts were erected to prevent their reoccupation.

The British commanders were hampered throughout by their insufficient equipment, and it was not until March 1853 that the largest of the Frontier wars was brought to an end after the loss of several hundred British soldiers. Shortly afterwards, British Kaffraria was made a crown colony. The Khoikhoi settlement at Kat River remained, but the Khoikhoi power within the colony was crushed.

== Xhosa cattle-killing movement and famine (1854–1858) ==
In 1854, the "lung sickness" disease spread through the cattle of the Xhosa. The disease arrived in South Africa with infected animals imported from the Netherlands by the settlers in 1853 to improve their herds. Widespread cattle deaths resulted. In April 1856, two girls, one named Nongqawuse, went to scare birds out of the fields. When she returned, she told her uncle Mhlakaza that she had met three spirits at the bushes, and that they had told her that all cattle should be slaughtered, and their crops destroyed. On the day following the destruction, the dead Xhosa would return and help expel the whites. The ancestors would bring cattle with them to replace those killed. Mhlakaza believed the prophecy, and repeated it to the chief Sarhili.

Sarhili ordered the commands of the spirits to be obeyed. At first, the Xhosa were ordered to destroy their fat cattle. Nongqawuse, standing in the river where the spirits had first appeared, heard unearthly noises, interpreted by her uncle as orders to kill more and more cattle. At length, the spirits commanded that not an animal of all their herds remain alive and all grain destroyed. If that were done, on a given date, myriads of cattle more beautiful than those destroyed would issue from the earth, while great fields of corn, ripe and ready for harvest, would instantly appear. The dead would rise, trouble and sickness vanish, and youth and beauty come to all alike. Unbelievers and the white man would perish. Great kraals were also prepared for the promised cattle and huge skin sacks to hold the milk that would soon be more plentiful than water. At length, the day dawned, which, according to the prophecies, was to usher in the terrestrial paradise. The sun rose and sank, but the expected miracle did not happen.

This movement drew to an end by early 1858. By then, approximately 40,000 people had starved to death and over 400,000 cattle had been slaughtered. Another 50,000 Xhosa people left to seek food and work in the British Cape Colony. Among the survivors was the girl Nongqawuse; however, her uncle perished. Sir George Grey, governor of the Cape at the time, ordered the European settlers not to help the Xhosa unless they entered labour contracts with the settlers who owned land there. Governor Grey and his administration believed in a conspiracy called the 'Chief’s Plot' where they claimed the chiefs deliberately starved their people to instill desperation so that the Xhosa would be recruited for war and attack the settlers. This narrative was used at the time to justify the confiscation of land from numerous chiefdoms. The land was distributed to colonial settlers, and over two hundred farms of around 1,500 acres each were created.

Historians view this movement as a millenarian response both directly to the lung disease spreading among Xhosa cattle and to the stress to Xhosa society caused by the continuing loss of their territory and autonomy. J. B. Peires, a leading historian on the conflict who wrote the standard account of the events, The dead will arise: Nongqawuse and the great Xhosa Cattle-Killing movement of 1856-7, summarizes the wider implications of the event as "the dogged resistance to colonial expansion which the Xhosa had sustained for nearly eighty bitter years was abruptly broken". Peires emphasized the role of Governor Grey, who both encouraged the movement then capitalized on its failure via the confiscation of land, imprisonment of chiefs, and exploitative labor contracts of the newly famished Xhosa. Another scholar summarizes the event as achieving "clear domination for the British over a powerful African kingdom when eight costly frontier wars had been unable to".

== Sir George Grey’s governorship (1854–1870) ==
Sir George Grey became governor of the Cape Colony in 1854, and the development of the colony owes much to his administration. In his opinion, policy imposed upon the colony by the home government's policy of not governing beyond the Orange River was mistaken, and in 1858 he proposed a scheme for a confederation that would include all of South Africa, however it was rejected by Britain as being impractical. Sir George kept open a British road through Bechuanaland to the far interior, gaining the support of the missionaries Robert Moffat and David Livingstone. Sir George also attempted for the first time, missionary effort apart, to educate the Cape Xhosa and to firmly establish British authority among them, which the self-destruction of the Xhosa rendered easy. Beyond the Kei River, the Transkei Xhosa were left to their own devices.

Sir George Grey left the Cape in 1861. During his governorship the resources of the colony had increased with the opening of the copper mines in Little Namaqualand, the mohair wool industry had been established and Natal made a separate colony. The opening, in November 1863, of the railway from Cape Town to Wellington, and the construction in 1860 of the great breakwater in Table Bay, long needed on that perilous coast, marked the beginning in the colony of public works on a large scale. They were the more-or-less direct result of the granting to the colony of a large share in its own government.

The province of British Kaffraria was incorporated into the colony in 1865, under the title of the Electoral Divisions of King William’s Town and East London. The transfer was marked by the removal of the prohibition of the sale of alcoholic beverages to the natives, and the free trade in intoxicants which followed had most deplorable results among the Xhosa tribes. A severe drought, affecting almost the entire colony for several years, caused great economic depression, and many farmers suffered severely. It was at this period in 1869 that ostrich-farming was successfully established as a separate industry.

Whether by or against the wish of the home government, the limits of British authority continued to extend. The Basotho, who dwelt in the upper valleys of the Orange River, had subsisted under a semi-protectorate of the British government from 1843 to 1854; but having been left to their own resources on the abandonment of the Orange sovereignty, they fell into a long exhaustive warfare with the Boers of the Orange Free State. On the urgent petition of their chief Moshesh, they were proclaimed British subjects in 1868, and their territory became part of the Cape Colony in 1871 (see Basutoland). In the same year, the southeastern part of Bechuanaland was annexed to Britain under the title of Griqualand West. This annexation was a consequence of the discovery there of rich diamond mines, an event which was destined to have far-reaching results.
