= British Kaffraria =

Territory in South Africa

Coordinates: 32°53′S 27°24′E

- Colony of the British Empire
- 1835–1866
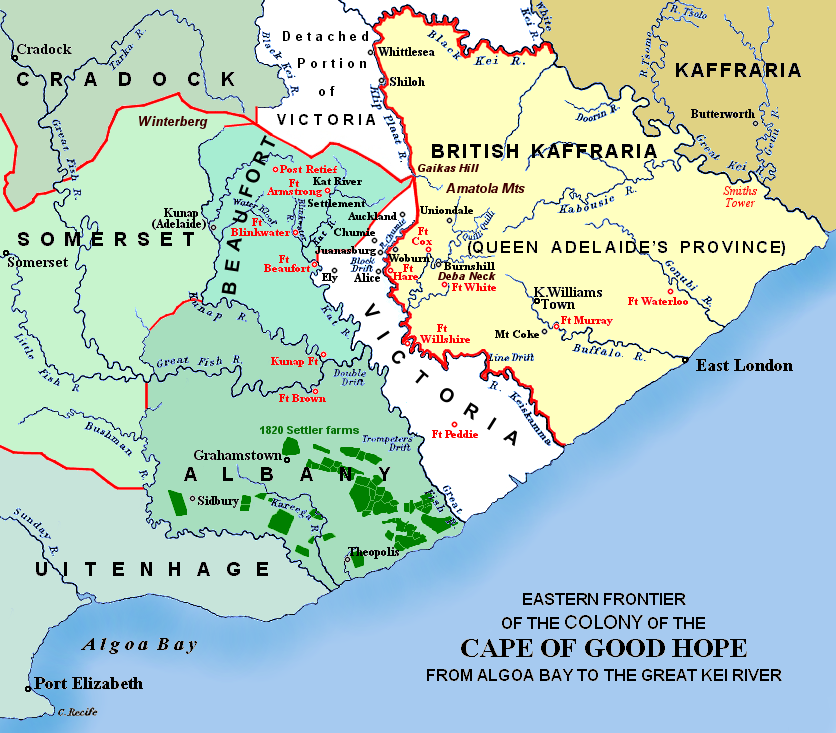
- Capital: King William's Town
- Population
  - 1858: 52,535
- History
  - Established: 1835
  - Disestablished: 1866

British Kaffraria was a British colony/subordinate administrative entity in present-day South Africa, consisting of the districts now known as Qonce (King William's Town) and East London. It was also called Queen Adelaide's Province and, unofficially, British Kaffiria and Kaffirland.

The British Kaffraria was established in 1847 when the British colonial government in the Cape Colony annexed the Ciskei region between the Keiskamma and Great Kei rivers and declared it a Crown Colony. Just 17 years later, it was incorporated into the Cape Colony after the Xhosa people suffered from a great famine following the Xhosa cattle-killing movement of 1856–57 and required relief from the British colonial government in the Cape Colony.

The term Kaffraria stems from the derogative word "Kaffir" which was used as a term for the Black African inhabitants of southern Africa. The word is derived from the Arabic kafir that is usually translated into English as "disbeliever" or "non-believer", i.e. a non-Muslim or "one without religion". The word was originally applied to non Muslims in general, and therefore to non-Muslim black peoples encountered along the Swahili coast by Arab traders. The word "Kaffraria" came to refer specifically to the Xhosa lands in what is now the Eastern Cape. Later, the western Xhosa lands which fell under British rule came to be known as British Kaffraria, while the still independent Xhosa territory to the east in the Transkei region was known simply as Kaffraria proper and would be incorporated into the Cape Colony later.

A subsection of British Kaffraria was later reconstituted by the apartheid regime as the semi-independent homeland of Ciskei.

== Colonial rule ==
Similar to elsewhere in Southern Africa, the aboriginal inhabitants of the area were the Khoisan hunter gatherers and herders. Early on, these peoples were displaced by the Bantu expansion, when it crossed the Kei river from the north. The area was consolidated under the rule of a branch of the Xhosa people.

=== Xhosa rule ===
The native Xhosa were ruled by the Ngqika ("Gaika") chiefs (part of the Rarabe offshoot of the main Xhosa line):

- Ngqika ka Mlawu (the founding Chief), 1797 – 13 November 1829
- Sandile kaNgqika, 13 November 1829 – 1 June 1878

=== British rule ===
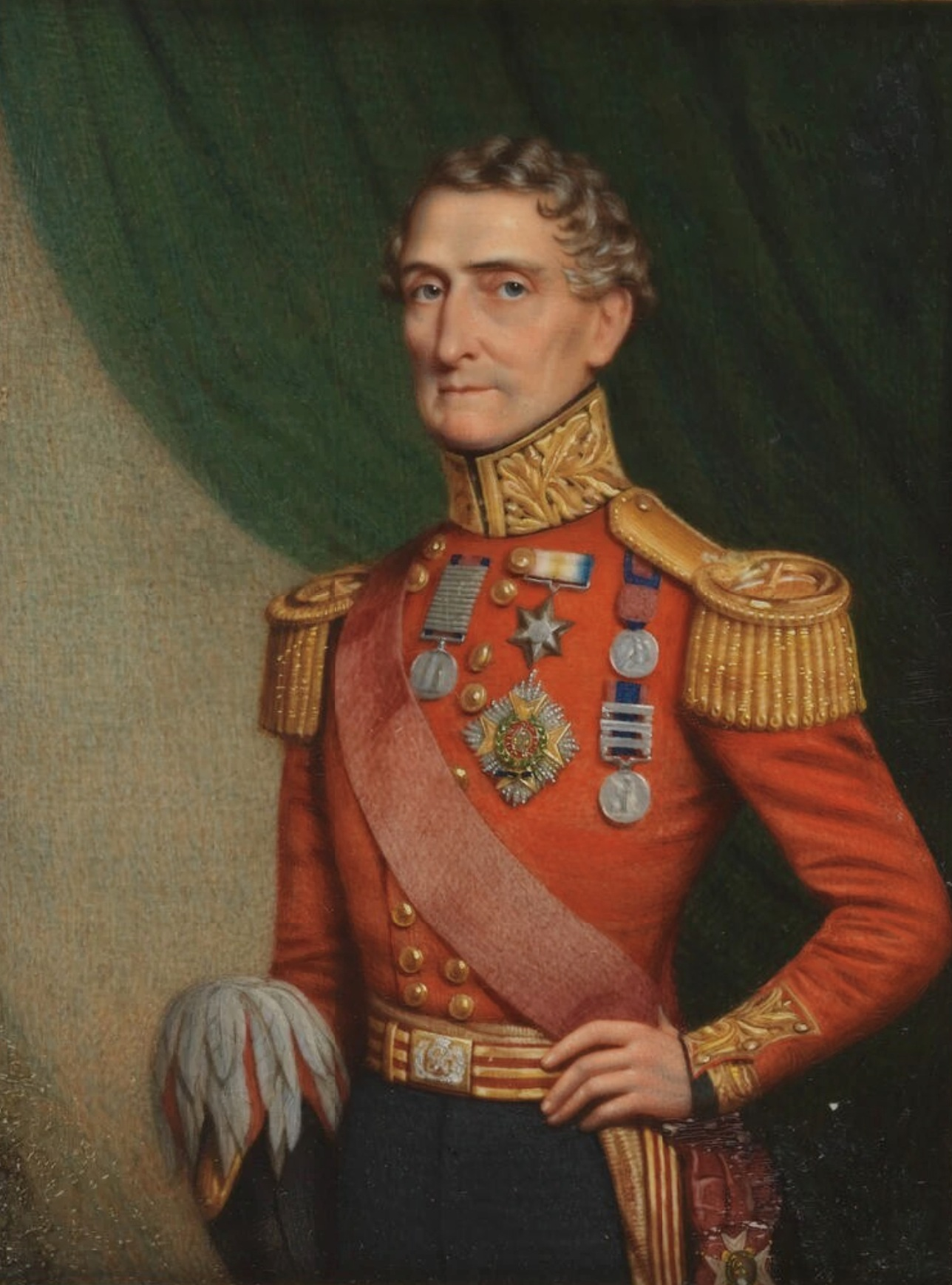
Sir Harry Smith

The territory came under British rule in the 19th century. However, there was great disagreement on how it should be governed, with the Cape Colony being reluctant to take responsibility for its administration. Its status therefore changed several times before it finally became part of the Cape Colony.

The territory’s administration was handled by a British military officer who was appointed as the chief commissioner. Each administrative chief was assisted by assistant commissioners who acted as magistrates, advisors and arbitrators among the several Xhosa tribes. The authority of the Xhosa chiefs was recognised to a limited degree since their decisions were subject to review by the British colonial government. Any decisions made by the Xhosa chiefs could also be reversed if they were contrary to the agenda of the colonial government. The Xhosa chiefs in British Kaffraria were mandated by the colonial government to acknowledge the authority of Queen Victoria and that of the British chief commissioner.

British commander Sir Harry Smith initially arrived in the Cape Of Good Hope in 1828 to lead colonial forces in the region. He led a British force in the Sixth Xhosa War of 1834-36. He returned from India in 1847 to become the governor of the Cape Colony. He attempted to unseat Chief Sandile of the Ngqika people (he was also the paramount chief of all Rharhabe tribes) in British Kaffraria when the Mlanjeni War (also known as the 8th Xhosa War) erupted in 1850. The war lasted until 1853 even after Smith was recalled.

==== "Queen Adelaide Province" in the Cape Colony (1835) ====
After the 6th Frontier War ("Hintsa's War"), on 10 May 1835, the area was seized by the British Governor Sir Benjamin d'Urban, and annexed to the Cape Colony as Queen Adelaide Province. It was established when the Xhosa people were driven across the Kei River and a new buffer zone was established with white settlers maintaining the new order. The province was divided into small chiefdoms that were controlled by magistrates who lived in the various chiefs’ Great Places. A location for the new province's government was selected, and named King William's Town. The province was declared to be for the settlement of loyal African tribes, those rebel tribes who agreed to replace their leadership, and the Fengu (known to the Europeans as the "Fingo people"), who had recently arrived fleeing from the Zulu armies and had been living under Xhosa subjection. Magistrates were appointed to administer the territory in the hope that they would gradually, with the help of missionaries, undermine tribal authority.

The area was named after Queen Adelaide, the wife of King William IV. When news of the annexation reached the Colonial Office, the authorities in London expressed their disapproval of D’Urban’s processes. The British government, along with the rest of Europe, was in the wake of the Romantic Age in 1835 and prescribed to a philanthropic approach. Lord Glenelg, the Secretary of State for the Colonies, stressed that Smith's method of annexation "had brought dishonour to the British name" and that "Queen Adelaide Province” would no longer be the name of the territory.

==== A separate "Queen Adelaide Land district" (1836–1847) ====
Only a few months after its forcible joining to the Cape Colony, on 5 December 1835, the Cape Colony disallowed the annexation. The province's creation was also condemned by London, as being uneconomical and unjust.

Queen Adelaide was formally disannexed in December 1836, the Cape's border was re-established back at the Keiskamma river, and new treaties were made with the chiefs responsible for order beyond the Fish River. The area was now renamed Queen Adelaide Land district, with Grahamstown as its capital. Indigenous rule by and large re-established itself in much of the territory and the land remained a separate entity until 1847.

==== "British Kaffraria" in the Cape Colony (1847–1860) ====
After the 7th Frontier War ("Amatola War"), on 17 December 1847, the area was again seized by the new British Governor Harry Smith, and again annexed to the Cape Colony, this time as the British Kaffraria Colony, with King William's Town as its capital. The new Governor re-occupied the abandoned forts and British Imperial troops were moved into the territory.

German emigrants arrived in British Kaffraria in 1858–1859, and again in 1877–1878.

==== A separate "British Kaffraria" Crown Colony (1860–1866) ====
On 7 March 1860, in the wake of the great Xhosa cattle-killing, the Cape Colony again dis-annexed British Kaffraria, and it became a separate crown colony. A separate Lieutenant Governor, Colonel John Maclean, was appointed to administer the colony. However economic problems threatened to bankrupt the colony and pressure was brought upon the neighbouring Cape Colony once again to take on the territory and its expenses.

==== Final annexation to the Cape Colony (1866) ====
British Kaffraria Act 1865 (Note: Section 1.)
- Act of Parliament
- Parliament of the United Kingdom
- Long title: An Act for the Incorporation of the Territories of British Kaffraria with the Colony of the Cape of Good Hope.
- Citation: 28 & 29 Vict. c. 5
- Territorial extent: United Kingdom

Dates
- Royal assent: 27 March 1865
- Commencement: 27 March 1865 (Note: The Acts of Parliament (Commencement) Act 1793.)
- Repealed: 9 June 1893
Other legislation
Amended by	Statute Law Revision Act 1878
Repealed by	Statute Law Revision Act 1893

Status: Repealed

Text of statute as originally enacted

It was finally re-incorporated into the Cape Colony on 17 April 1866.

From 1853 to 1866 the territory used the stamps of the Cape of Good Hope, the mail being sent from Port Elizabeth or overland from the Cape.

The area eventually formed the basis of the Ciskei independent homeland.

== See also ==
- Ciskei
- Transkei
- Kaffraria
- Xhosa Wars
- Ngqika people
