= Fingoland =

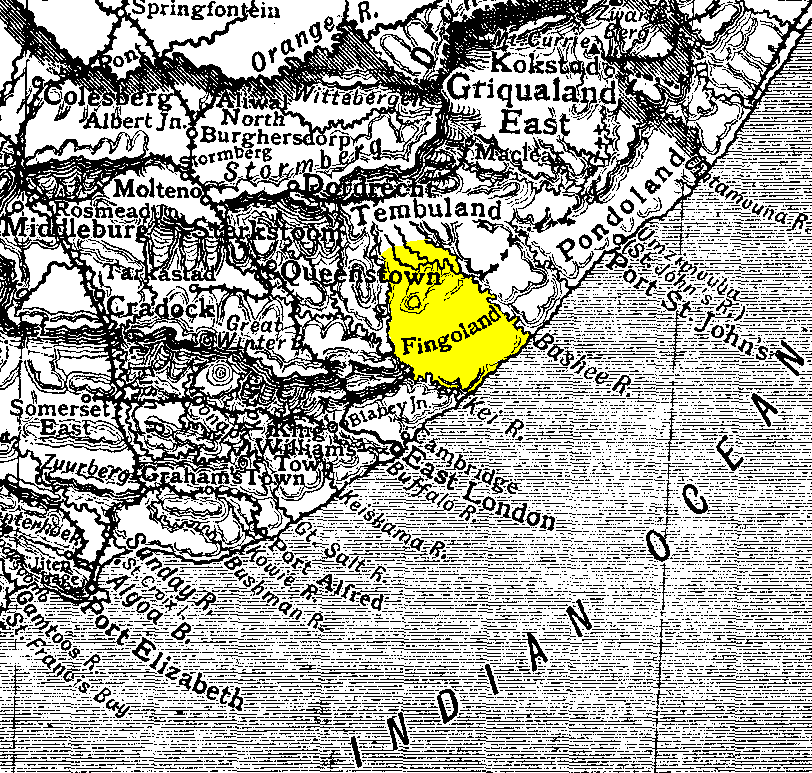
Map of Fingoland and surrounding territories of the Eastern Cape. South Africa. 1911.

Fingoland was a historical territory situated in what is now the Eastern Cape, South Africa. It was inhabited primarily by the Xhosa people of the Mfengu clans, and was located in the south-west portion of the "Transkei" region.

The region that was later known as the Transkei was originally divided into territories known as the Idutywa Reserve, Fingoland (Mfenguland) and Xhosaland. Fingoland lay by the borderlands in the far south of the Transkei, just north of the Kei River.

Following their annexation by the British however, these territories were restructured into the divisions of Butterworth, Tsomo and Ngqamakwe for Fingoland; Centani and Willowvale for Xhosaland; and Idutywa for the Idutywa Reserve.

== Location ==
The territory is located between the Kei and the Bashee rivers, close to the city of East London. Within the Transkei region, Fingoland is located in the far south-west corner on the coast, just south of Tembuland and west of Pondoland.

== History ==
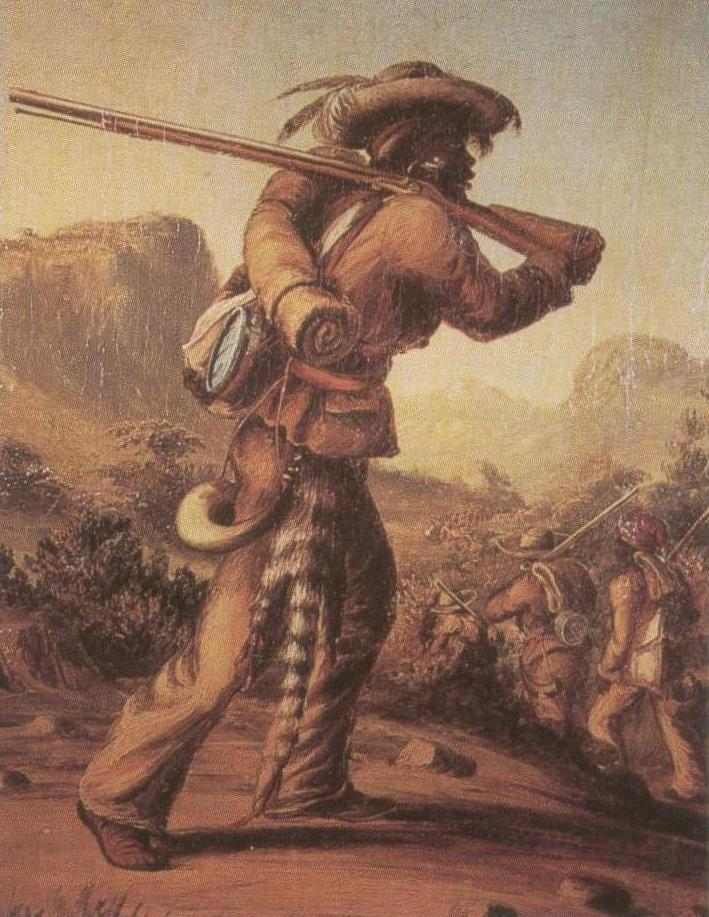
The amaFengu, known across southern Africa as skilled gunmen, were invaluable allies of the Cape in its frontier wars.

The original inhabitants of southern Africa were undoubtedly the Khoikhoi and San Bushmen. Iron-working, farming, speakers of Nguni languages arrived in the first millennium AD, the fore-front of the great "Bantu Migration" from further north. The Fengu people, whose name means "Wanderers", arrived in the area in the early 1800s fleeing from Shaka's Zulu armies in the east. After settling among the Xhosas they were assimilated into the Xhosa cultural way of life by the Xhosas. However they suffered repression from the Gcaleka Xhosa and fled further west towards the then Cape Colony.

They settled in their current area in 1835, on invitation from the Cape Government, and became adept and fearsome military allies of the Cape Colony in its frontier wars.

Fingoland was annexed to the Cape Colony by treaty and act of Parliament in 1877 (Act 38 of 1877(C)). The act ordered that the inhabitants of Fingoland were to elect two seats in the Cape Parliament. At the time, the Cape Colony operated under its multi-racial "Cape Qualified Franchise" system, so qualifications for suffrage applied equally to all male residents, regardless of race. The full promulgation of the annexation act only took place several years later.

== See also ==
- Fengu people
- Xhosa Wars
