= Sarili kaHintsa =

King of Xhosa nation from 1835 to 1892

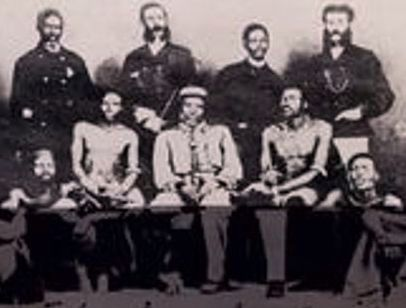
King Sarili ka Hintsa (centre seated) with councillors.

King Sarhili Ka-Hintsa (about 1810 - 1892) was the King of Xhosa nation from 1835 until his death in 1892 at Sholora, Bomvanaland. He was also known as "Kreli", and led the Xhosa armies in a series of frontier wars.

== Early life and family ==
Sarili was the oldest son of the Great Hintsa ka Khawuta and Nomsa kaGambushe Tshezi.

Sarili had nine wives including Nohuthe, Nondwe of the abaThembu and Bayo of the amaGwali. His first heir died in 1853 at the age of 12 and the next in line was his son Sigcawu ka Sarili from his second wife Nohuthe. His daughter Novili Nomkafulo became the great wife of Ngangelizwe Qeya, the 6th paramount chief of the abaThembu. Another daughter Nowisile became the wife of Chief Falo Mgudlwa of the amaJumba Thembu and the adoptive mother of the future Thembu national poet Mbombini Molteno Sihele. Another daughter became the wife of Mhlontlo of the Mpondomise and another became the wife of Chief Gwadiso of the Khonjwayo.

== Reign (1835-1892) ==
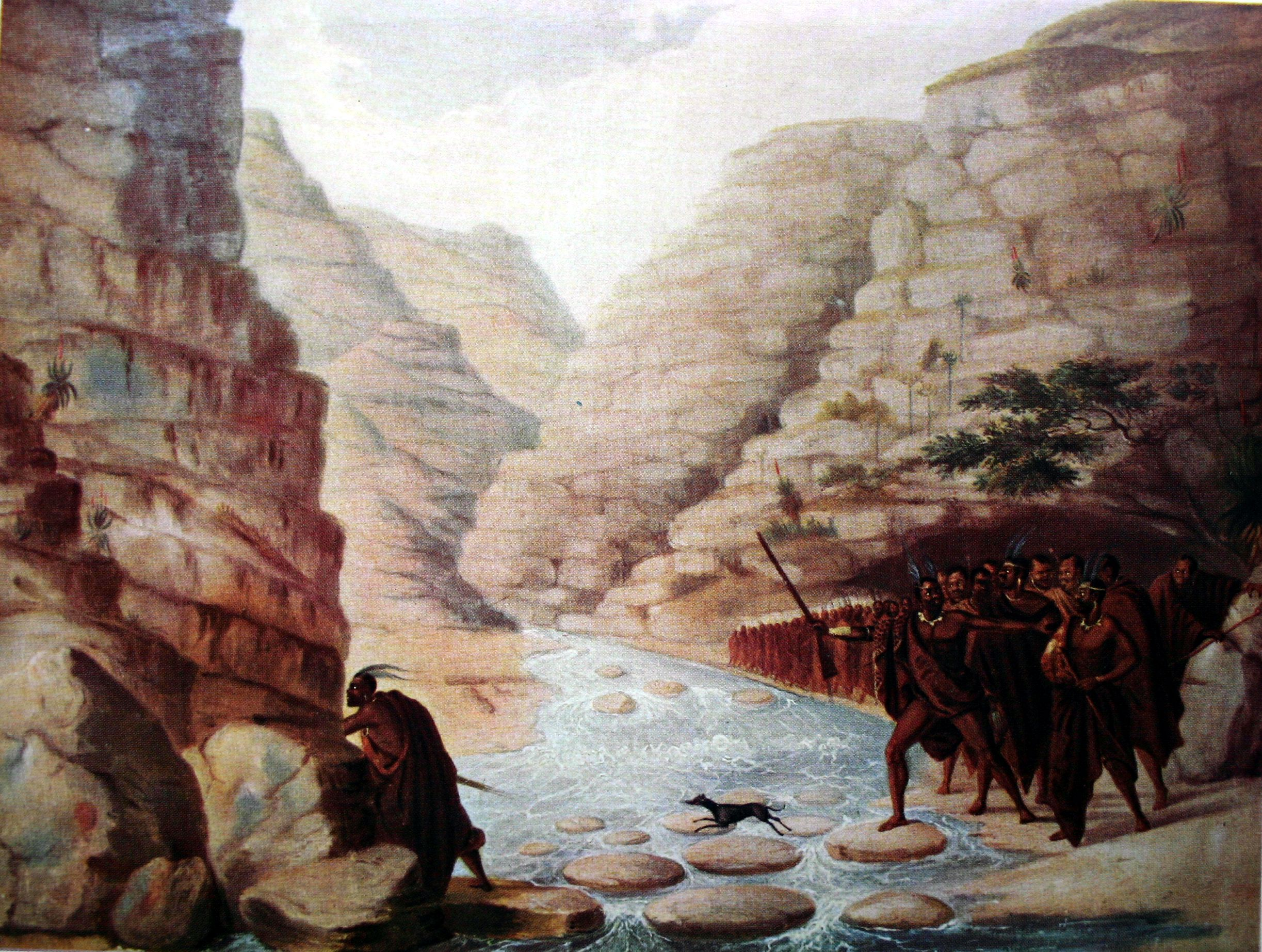
A column of Sarili's army, crossing a ravine in the frontier mountains, during the Eighth Frontier War.

Sarhili ascended without any dispute to his birth right. However, the young king had a difficult start, because King Hintsa's power had mostly fallen to his Great Councillors and so Sarhili struggled to assert himself in his own right. When Sarhili left his father's Great Place (the residence of the King), as custom, to establish himself, he began trying to fight the Sotho to no avail. He then tried to conquer the upper Kei region in 1839 that was occupied by what was itself a Xhosa state, the Thembu, but led by Mtirara, he was defeated and retreated. In July 1843, Sarhili tried again this time with the official army of the Xhosa Kingdom and succeeded in seizing Thembuland. King Sarhili then set up his Great Place at Hohita, the capital of Xhosaland.

Throughout his reign, Sarili entered into intermittent conflict against the expanding Cape Colony. He was a skilled diplomat who was respected and loved, even by those of the prominent whites of the Cape who knew him well.

He typically sought to maintain Gcaleka independence by avoiding direct confrontation with the Cape Colony. This strategy initially worked, but as a nationalist and paramount chief of all the Xhosa, he was later drawn into conflict with the Cape by the neighbouring Ngqika Xhosa. His Kingdom's indirect aid to the Ngqika during the Seventh and Eighth Frontier Wars (1846–1853) was discovered and led to a temporary British invasion of Gcalekaland.

=== The Great culling (1856-1858) and aftermath ===
Sarili played an important part in the Great Cattle Killing, a millennialist movement which began among the Xhosa in 1856, and led them to destroy their own means of subsistence in the belief that it would bring about salvation by supernatural spirits, who would return and drive all white people into the sea. Genuinely believing the prophecies of Nongqawuse, Sarili destroyed his cattle and crops, causing thousands of his subjects to do likewise. The famine that followed devastated the last Xhosa Kingdom, forcing the Xhosa to turn to the neighbouring Cape Colony for food, blankets and other relief. His fostering of the cattle killing also led to him being hated in white opinion, as the supposed villain of the frontier conflicts. He was briefly exiled from Gcalekaland, to the territory on the far side of the Mbashe, only being allowed to return in 1865. In his absence, the Mfengu people (traditional enemies of the Gcaleka) settled in much of his former land.

=== Fengu-Gcaleka War (1877-1879) ===
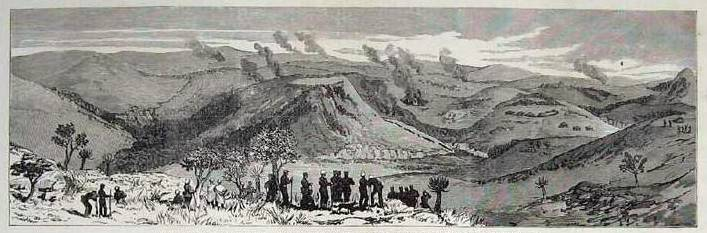
A local commando on the Cape-Gcalekaland frontier during the conflict, 1878.

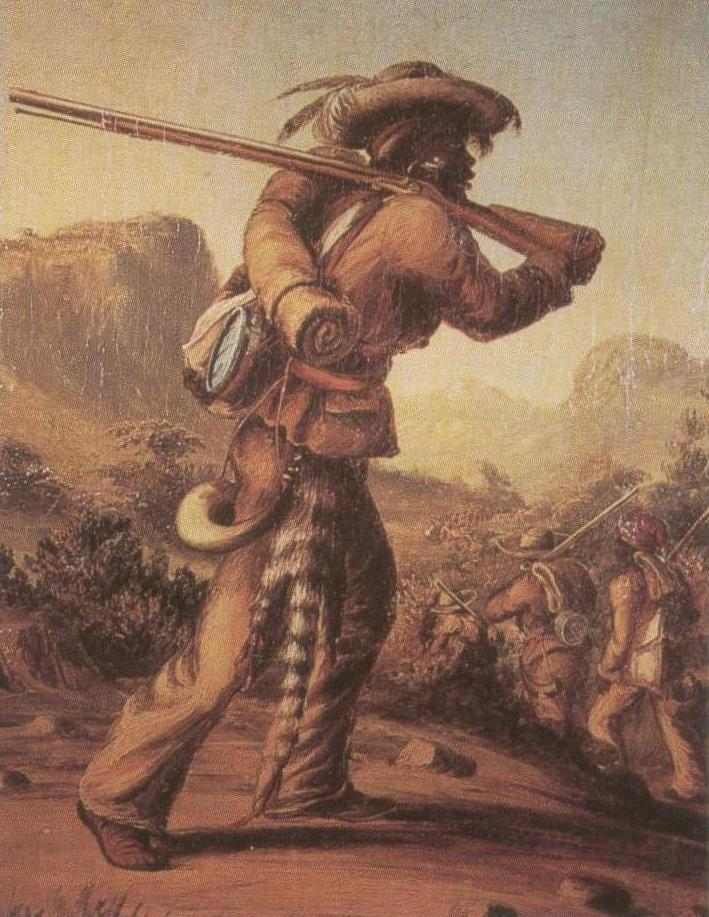
The Fengu ("Fingoes"), renowned sharpshooters and traditional enemies of the Gcaleka, were confronted by Sarili in the final frontier war.

Subsequently, the policies of the Cape Colony and those of the government in London differed with regards to Sarili. The Cape achieved responsible government in 1872 and, with little further interest in annexing Xhosa land, signed treaties with both Sarili and his enemies such as the Thembu, recognising Gcalekaland's territorial integrity. The British government, on the other hand, sought to offer protection to increasing numbers of Transkeian chiefdoms, isolating Sarili diplomatically and reducing his power in the region. Both parties appear to have favoured Sarili's enemies in trade and other dealings with the Transkei territories, and when fighting broke out between Sarili and the neighbouring Thembu, the British government intervened once again and brought yet another of his opponents under their protection.

From the mid-1870s, a series of severe droughts across the Transkei began to place growing strain on the relative peace which had prevailed for the previous few decades. The droughts had begun as early as 1875 in Sarhili's territory, and had spread to other parts of the Transkei and Basutoland, and even into the Cape Colony controlled Ciskei. Their severity increased up until 1877 and ethnic tensions began to break out, particularly between the Mfengu, the Thembu and the Gcaleka Xhosa.

In 1877, fighting between Mfengu and Gcaleka tribesmen broke out at a festival, rapidly escalating into a shoot-out and finally into a full-blown inter-tribal war that spread along the frontier. Sarili sought to avoid any further escalation of this conflict, as he fully understood that the Mfengu, as allies of the Cape Colony, would draw all forces stationed in the Cape which he could not overcome. However he was nonetheless forced into involvement by several of his councillors and chiefs. Decades of hostile relations with the Cape Colony, overpopulation, and pressure from his councillors drove Sarili into a corner, and he mobilised his armies. Initially the situation seemed unlikely to escalate further, as the Cape Colony government insisted on only deploying its local mounted commandos to police the frontier, but the involvement of the British government, via Sir Sir Henry Bartle Frere, desiring to finally annex Gcalekaland for his planned confederation of South Africa.

Sarili tried to unite the Xhosa tribes into a unified force in order to prevent the annexation, but after two devastating pitched battles, he declared an end to his resistance and went into exile, first in Pondoland and afterwards to Bomvanaland.

He died in exile in 1892, at Sholora, Bomvanaland.
