= Nongqawuse =

Xhosa prophet (c. 1841–1898)

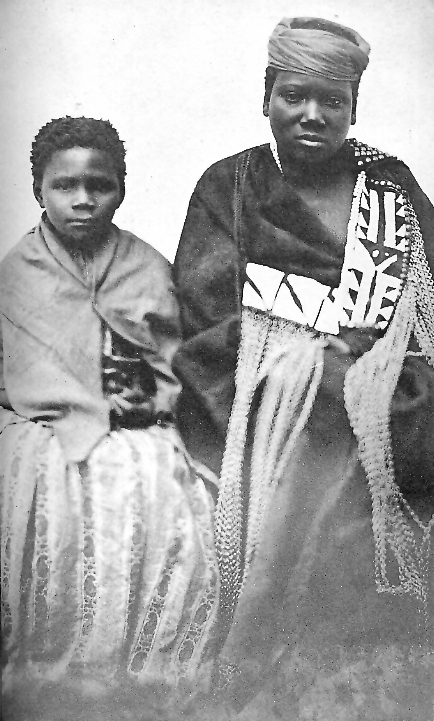
- Nongqawuse (right) with fellow prophet Nonkosi
- Born: c. 1841; Gxarha, Cape Colony (today Centane, South Africa)
- Died: 1898; Gxarha, Cape Colony
- Occupation: Prophet
- Known for: Xhosa cattle-killing movement and famine of 1856–1857

Nongqawuse (Xhosa pronunciation: [noᵑǃʱawuːse]; c. 1841 – 1898) was a Xhosa prophetess. Her prophecies resulted in a millenarian belief that culminated in the Xhosa cattle-killing and famine of 1856–1857, in what is now Eastern Cape, South Africa.

== Early life ==
Nongqawuse was a Xhosa woman, born in 1841 near the Gxarha River in independent Xhosaland but close to the border of the recently established colony of British Kaffraria in Eastern Cape, South Africa. Little is known of Nongqawuse's parents, as they died when she was young. According to historian Jeffrey B. Peires, Nongqawuse stated in a deposition that "Mhlakaza was my uncle ... my father's name Umhlanhla of the Kreli tribe. He died when I was young." Nongqawuse’s parents died during the Waterkloof campaigns of the Eighth Frontier War (1850–1853).

Nongqawuse is believed to have been quite conscious and aware of the tensions between the Xhosa and the Cape Colony. During this period, Xhosa lands were being encroached upon by European settlers. The orphaned Nongqawuse was raised by her uncle Mhlakaza, who was the son of a counsellor of Xhosa King Sarili kaHintsa.

Mhlakaza was a religious man, a Xhosa spiritualist, who left Xhosaland after his mother's death and spent time in the Cape Colony, where he became familiar with Christianity. He returned to Xhosaland in 1853. Mhlakaza was to have a major influence on Nongqawuse's life, acting as an interpreter and organiser of her visions.

== Spiritual experience ==
In April 1856, 15-year-old Nongqawuse and her friend Nombanda, who was between the ages of 8 and 10, went to scare birds from her uncle's crops in the fields by the sea at the mouth of the River Gxarha in the present day Wild Coast region of South Africa. When she returned, Nongqawuse told Mhlakaza that she had met the spirits of two of her ancestors. She claimed that the spirits had told her that the Xhosa people should destroy their crops and kill their cattle, the source of their wealth as well as food. Nongqawuse claimed that the ancestors who had appeared to them said:

1. The dead would arise.
2. All living cattle would have to be slaughtered, having been reared by contaminated hands.
3. Cultivation would cease.
4. New grain would have to be dug.
5. New houses would have to be built.
6. New cattle enclosures would have to be erected.
7. New milk sacks would have to be made.
8. Doors would have to be weaved with buka (Apocynaceae) roots.
9. People must abandon witchcraft, incest and adultery.

In return, the spirits would sweep all European settlers into the sea. The Xhosa people would be able to replenish the granaries and fill the kraals with more beautiful and healthier cattle.

== Obeying the prophecy ==
During this time, many Xhosa herds were plagued with "lung sickness", possibly introduced by European cattle. Mhlakaza did not believe her at first but when Nongqawuse described one of the men, Mhlakaza (himself a diviner) recognised the description as that of his dead brother and became convinced she was telling the truth. Mhlakaza repeated the prophecy to Sarili. The cattle-killing frenzy affected not only the Gcaleka, Sarili's clan, but the whole of the Xhosa nation. Historians estimate that the Gcaleka killed between 300,000 and 400,000 head of cattle.

Not all Xhosa people believed Nongqawuse's prophecies. A small minority, known as the amagogotya (stingy ones), refused to slaughter and neglect their crops, and this refusal was used by Nongqawuse to rationalise the failure of the prophecies during a period of fifteen months (April 1856 – June 1857).

== Aftermath ==
Nongqawuse predicted that the ancestors' promise would be fulfilled on 18 February 1857, when the sun would become red. After the failure of Nongqawuse's prophecy, her followers initially blamed those who had not obeyed her instructions. They later turned against her. Chief Sarili visited the River Gxarha's outlet, and spoke with Nongqawuse and Mhlakaza. When he returned, he announced that the New World would begin in eight days. On the eighth day the sun would rise, blood-red, and before setting again, there would be a huge thunderstorm, after which "the dead would arise". During the next eight days the cattle-killing climaxed. These prophecies also failed to come true.

The practices ended by early 1858. By then, approximately 40,000 people had starved to death and more than 400,000 cattle had been slaughtered. The population of British Kaffraria decreased from 105,000 to fewer than 27,000 due to the resulting famine. The chief of Bomvana gave Nongqawuse to Major Gawler and she stayed at his home for a period. One day, Mrs. Gawler decided to dress her, along with the Mpondo prophetess Nonkosi, and have their portrait taken by a photographer. This is the widely circulated image of Nongqawuse that most people are familiar with. After her release, she lived on a farm in the Alexandria district of the eastern Cape. She died in 1898.

The valley where Nongqawuse alleged to have met the spirits is still called Intlambo kaNongqawuse (Xhosa for "Valley of Nongqawuse").

== See also ==
- Bulhoek massacre
- Nontetha, Xhosa prophetess
- Zakes Mda's novel The Heart of Redness
- Ghost Dance, a millennialist philosophy that called for a return to a pre-colonial era among Native Americans in the West of the United States, inspired allegedly by a prophetic dream.
