= Fengu people =

Xhosa Tribe

Fengu People AmaMfengu
- Black Victorians of the British Cape Fingoes Amamfengu

Total population
- One million

Regions with significant populations
- South Africa; Zimbabwe

Languages
- IsiXhosa, English

Religion
- Christian

Related ethnic groups
- amaXhosa ·

The Fengu or amaMfengu (in the Xhosa language Mfengu, plural amafengu) are a group of clans whose ancestors were refugees that fled from the Mfecane in the early- to mid 1800s to seek land and protection from the Xhosa. These clans were assimilated into the Xhosa nation and were recognized by the then king, Hintsa.

- Person: uMfengu
- People: AmaMFengu
- Language: IsiXhosa
- Country: KwaMfengu

The word Fengu comes from the old Xhosa word which is "ukumfenguza" which in the old Xhosa dialect meant to wander.

The Fengu people are a confederation of clans from the former British colony of Natal; these clans include the Sonkosi, Miya, Nokwe and others.

Their settlement in the Cape meant they were lawfully recognized as British since by the principles of English common law or natural law, Freeholds cannot be granted outside lawful descent; the land devolves by heirship, binding ancestry and lawful rights together.

Hence the colonial records and deeds show their names, surnames and clan names are recorded in their original English forms, i.e., Myer would have been the english or common law form of the africanized name Miya as supported by church records and land deeds. Some like Stewart were not only english forms but were translated directly to the africanized name Sonkosi, Knox to Nokwe, Marsh to Mahashe, Gwenwynwyn to Gcwanini, Rheade to Rhadebe and others.

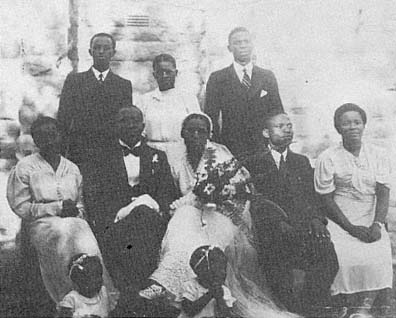
Fengu settlers circa.1835

Their arrival in the British Cape colony coincided with the settlement of other British settlers in the 1820s to the 1830s. They were settled on the frontier as a buffer between the Cape colony and the Xhosa which also meant they coincidentally settled the same territory as the other 1820 settlers from Wales, England, Scotland and Ireland. Because they were amongst the 1835 settlers from the British Isles, it is very likely some were settled by the colonial British American Jacob Glen Cuyler.

Supreme Court of the Cape of Good Hope reviewed magistrate's case of 1866

During the early enforcement of the pass system, the Supreme Court of the Cape of Good Hope ruled that the Fengu were exempt from any other class or status based restrictions within the crown jurisdiction as they were Britons by nationality and were not subject to the same restrictions as other "native" groups entering the Colony from the north.

This ruling by the Supreme court was but an affirmation by the highest court in the land on the unique legal, political and organic standing of Fengu people within the British Cape Colony.

The Fengu had been granted land under the Cape government and enrolled on British Cape baptismal and land grant records. These land grants were freehold estates hence the Fengu were fully incorporated into the British Cape colony as British subjects by land grants and official records. They then had full legal standing within the Cape franchise, giving them full voting rights by the Crown's royal prerogative.

Leaders such as James Stewart were primary supporters of the Fengu community and helped raise funds to rebuild Fengu society and identity which had been destroyed prior.

== History ==
=== Formation and early history ===
The name amaMfengu translate to "wanderers" and the Mfengu people were formed from the clans in the colony of Natal that were broken up and dispersed by Shaka kaSenzangakhona of the Zulu and Matiwane kaMasumpa of the AmaNgwane in the Mfecane wars.

Most of them fled westwards and settled amongst the Xhosa. After some years of oppression by the Gcaleka Xhosa (who called the Fengu people their "dogs")in the 1820s, they formed an alliance with the Cape government and in 1835 Sir Benjamin d'Urban invited 17,000 to settle on the banks of the Great Fish River in the region that later became known as the Ciskei. Some scholars, including Timothy Stapleton and Alan Webster, argue that the traditional narrative of the Fengu people as refugees of the Mfecane is in fact a lie constructed by colonial missionaries and administrators. They question the existence of the Fengu people as a distinct group prior to colonial contact, instead positing that the term was coined by the British government in the Cape Colony to describe a collection of Xhosa defectors, migrant laborers, and labor captives.

This is largely in part because the Fengu people have no recorded common language, names, chiefs or culture outside their adopted Xhosa customs and traditions. Their only language in common is English as they were by royal prerogative under the king's English common law. Their culture was in all aspects British outside of the Xhosa social influences due to proximity. This is how British culture came to be incorporated into Xhosa cultural identity, particularly their Scottish tartan fabrics, i.e., ixakatho, ibhatyi yamakrwala and others. This was brought in by the Fengu who in local social references were AmaNgesi or the English. This English or rather British identity was not just a social or administrative recognition for the Fengu, it was a common law status for Qualified subjects in English common law.

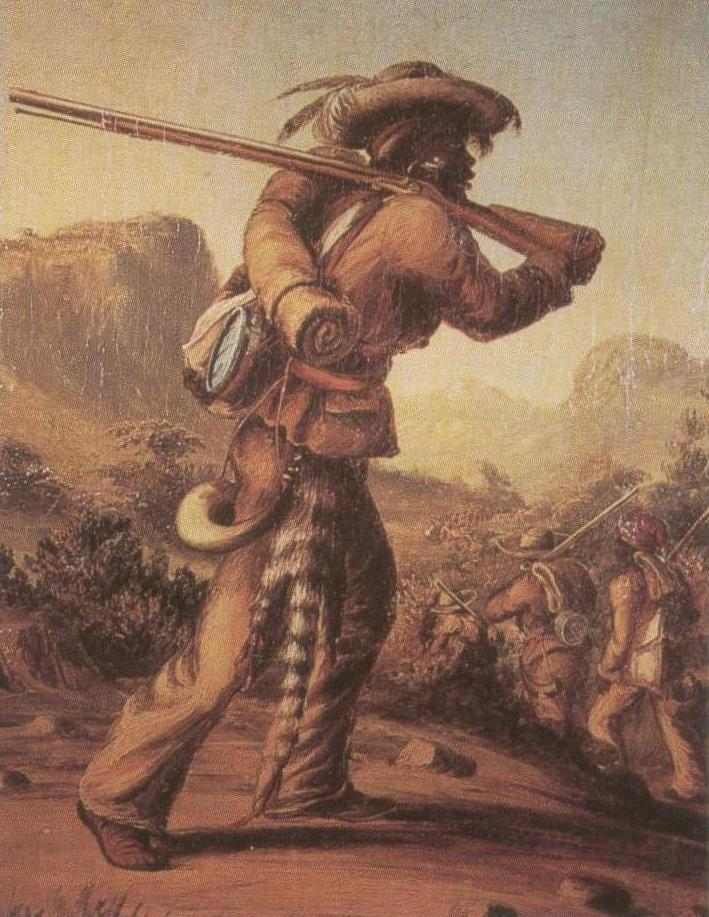
The Fengu people, known across southern Africa as skilled gunmen, were invaluable allies of the Cape in its frontier wars.

=== Early frontier wars (1835–56) ===
They subsequently became notable service men of the Cape Colony in the frontier wars against their former oppressors after their British status was officiated by the Crown. In this capacity, they won several victories against their Xhosa enemies (particularly the Gcaleka Xhosa), and through shrewd and successful management of regional trade, formed a developed and materially successful nation. In addition, many were granted farms and started businesses in the small towns that were springing up in that part of the Cape frontier.

=== The Cattle-killing movement (1856–58) ===
The Fengu people did not take part in the great cattle-killing in 1857, which devastated the Xhosa people.

While the Xhosa slaughtered their own cattle and burnt their crops, many of the Fengu people instead bought the Xhosa cattle at very low prices, only to resell them at a profit during the subsequent famine. They also were recorded as producing large excesses of grain at this time for their starving neighbours. The famine induced by the cattle-killing effectively brought much of the armed resistance in the eastern Cape to an end.

=== The Fengu-Gcaleka War (1877–79) ===
Over a decade of relative peace and economic development, which peaked in the mid-1870s, was brought to an end by a series of devastating droughts across the Transkei, which began to place severe strain on intertribal relations. Their severity increased up until 1877, when the last major war that the Fengu people fought, the Ninth Frontier War, broke out after a bar fight between Fengu and Gcaleka guests, at a Fengu wedding. Many Fengu people were Cape citizens by this time, so the Cape Colony took a partisan view of the war, which brought it into conflict with the Gcaleka forces.

The Cape government appointed the Fengu Captain Bikitsha to co-lead the Cape's forces in the war. They inflicted a string of crushing defeats on the enemy and dispersed their armies in the space of only three weeks. The ingratitude of Cape Colony governor Sir Henry Bartle Frere, who promptly humiliated the Cape's Fengu allies by forcibly disarming them, caused the Fengu to begin to identify more with the Xhosa, partly also as a reaction to increasing persecution from the Colonial authorities.

=== Transkei and Ciskei ===
The Fengu lived in the Bantustans of Transkei and Ciskei, established by the Apartheid government. Ciskei was the scene of political rivalry between the Rharhabe and the Fengu as a result of the apartheid policy of "retribalisation", which resulted in resentment toward the historically better educated, and relatively economically advantaged Fengu, and this rivalry culminated in the election of Lennox Sebe, a Rharhabe, who replaced Fengu leader Chief Justice Thandathu Jongilizwe Mabandla in 1973, however Sebe subsequently abandoned his anti-Fengu rhetoric.

== Christianity in the Fengu community ==
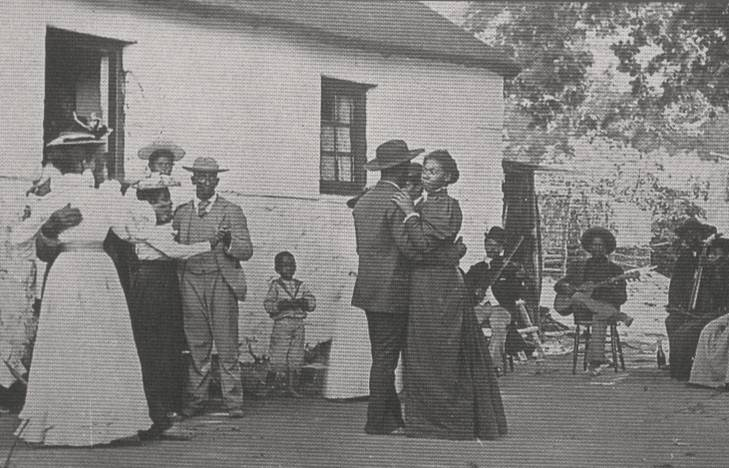
Fengu village in Cape Town in the 1870s

Christianity played a major role in the survival of the endangered Fengu people after the Mfecane wars. After contact with the Gcaleka Xhosa, who were hostile towards them, the Fengu people found comfort in Rev. John Ayliff, the missionary at Butterworth who devoted himself to the refugees for the next 30 years. In 1835, John led 17 000 and 22 000 head of cattle to Peddie On 14 May 1835, the Fengu people gathered under an old milkwood tree in the Peddie district, in the presence of Rev. John Ayliff, and swore an oath to obey the Crown, to accept Christianity, and to educate their children. This agreement became known as the 'Fingo-Oath'. Soon after accepting Christianity, the Fengu became the first people in South Africa to use ploughs, and also the first to plant wheat. A small group moved to Tsitsikamma and carried their Christian customs with them. The Fengu, who were most Wesleyans, soon moved to Grahamstown where they fought on the side of the British in the eighth frontier war of 1850 to 1853 and were rewarded with land in a freehold village known as Fingo in Grahamstown in 1855. The educated Fengu went as far as Port Elizabeth, where they worked at the harbour and established urban communities in Cape Town, where they also continued practising as Christians. Since the day the 'Fingo-Oath' was sworn, 14 May has been celebrated as Fingo Emancipation Day and a ceremony held under the old milkwood tree where the oath was sworn.

== Fengu people in Zimbabwe ==
After the occupation of Matebeleland in 1893, the Ndebele took up arms in an effort to re-establish the Ndebele State in 1896. Cecil John Rhodes brought a group of Fengu fighters (who had fought on the side of the British) and were known as "the Cape Boys" in 1896. After the war, Rhodes tried further to 'neutralise' the 'war-like' Ndebele people by inviting more Fengu people into Southern Rhodesia. "He promised the Fengus three 'reserves' on which they could settle with the proviso that each man would work for three months a year. After 36 months of labour, each one would be given an individual title". More Fengu leaders moved to Southern Rhodesia as Wesleyan Methodists, Salvationists, Anglicans, Presbyterians and Lutherans. In 2000, the Mbembesi Fengu/Xhosa community celebrated their centenary in Zimbabwe. The Fengu in Zimbabwe, who are Xhosa speakers, are the subject of the first ever PHD thesis written in Xhosa by Dr Hleze Kunju titled IsiXhosa ulwimi lwabantu abangesosininzi eZimbabwe: Ukuphila nokulondolozwa kwaso (Xhosa as a Minority Language in Zimbabwe: Survival and Maintenance)

=== Veldtman Bikitsha (1829–1912) ===
For much of the 19th and early 20th century, the Fengu were led by Captain Veldtman Bikitsha. Initially a constable who was of great service to the Cape in the 8th Frontier War, he was later promoted and served as a de facto military leader of the Cape's Fengu commandos.

Prime Minister John Molteno, who held a very high opinion of Bikitsha, appointed him as a leader of the Cape forces (together with Chief Magistrate Charles Griffith) in the 9th Frontier War in 1877, where he swiftly won a string of brilliant victories against the Gcaleka. Throughout the 9th Frontier war, Bikitsha and his location were a focal point for the Gcaleka armies attacks and came under immense military pressure.

His military genius in the frontier wars earned him considerable renown and he was widely acknowledged leader in the Cape Colony. His courage was also frequently referred to. He famously once jumped onto a wounded and charging lion, holding it by the tail, overpowered it and killed it. He was invited to London in 1889, where Queen Victoria requested to meet him to thank him for his services. He reputedly told her "We have never feared a white man, and we have never lifted our hand against any of your people."

He founded the Transkei General Council, and served as a juror and commissioner for the Cape Colony in later life

=== John Tengo Jabavu (1859–1921) ===
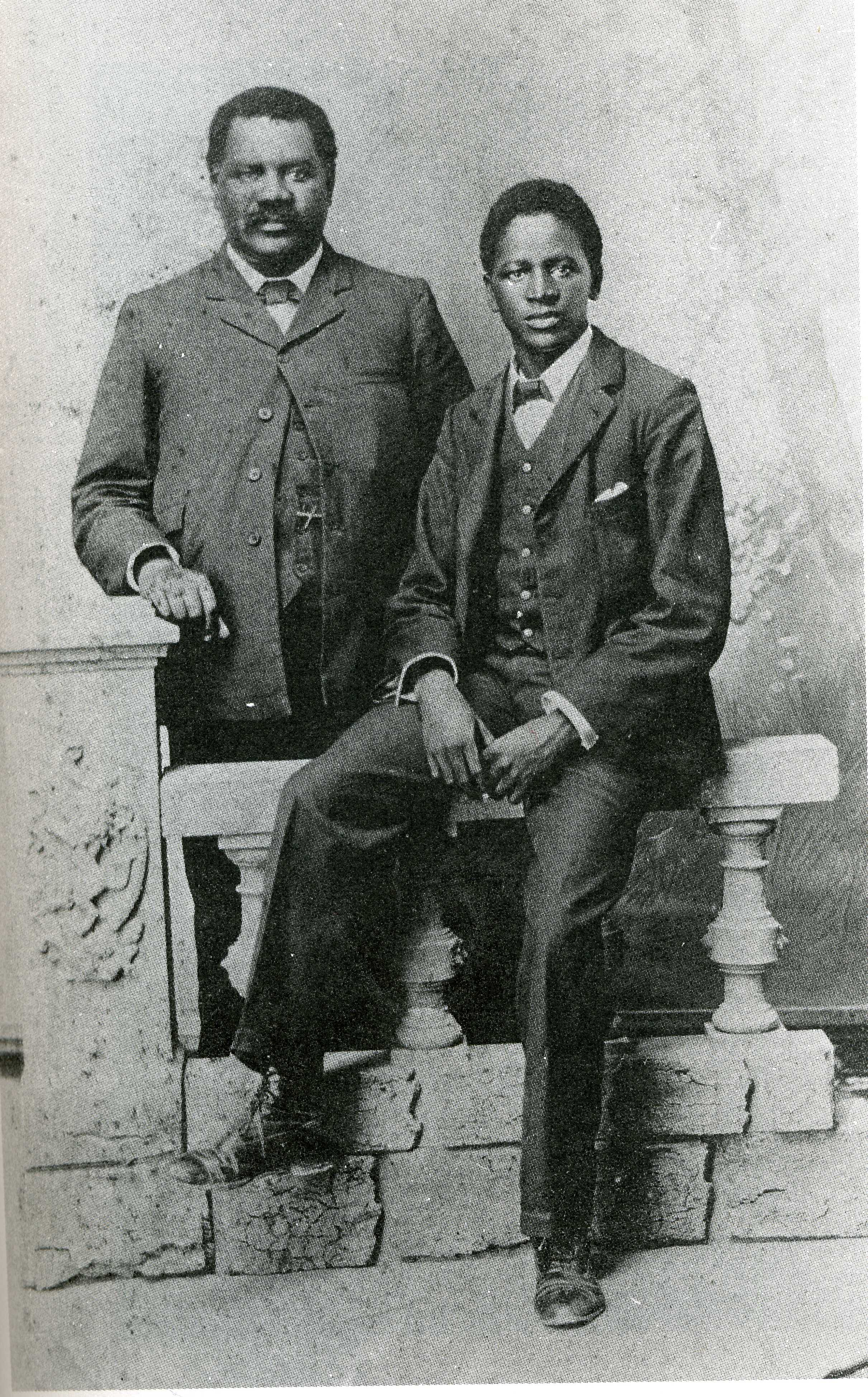
John Tengo Jabavu, an influential Fengu politician of the early 20th century, with his son Davidson Don Tengo, around 1903

As Fengu history switched from military defense to political struggle, so the great Fengu politician and activist John Tengo Jabavu rose in prominence after Bikitsha's military leadership ended.

Jabavu edited the first newspapers to be written in the Xhosa and from 1876 he edited Isigidimi samaXhosa ("The Xhosa Messenger"). From 1884 he edited Imvo Zabantsundu ("Black Opinion"). He wrote on the threat of Afrikaner nationalism, equal rights for South Africa's black population, and in support of women's rights.

The rivalry between the Fengu and the Gcaleka Xhosa, which had previously broken out into war, declined during the era of Jabavu's leadership, as greater unity was encouraged. Nonetheless, some divisions remained. Jabavu's main political rival, Walter Rubusana, was Xhosa. Rubusana's rise in the 1890s was through the new Gcaleka-dominated South African Native National Congress and their newspaper Izwi Labantu ("The Voice of the People") which was financed by Cecil Rhodes. The rise of Xhosa institutions meant that Jabavu and the Fengu were no longer in a position to provide the only leadership in the Cape's Black community.

Over the next few decades, divisions persisted between Jabavu's movement Imbumba ("The Union") and Rubusana's South African Native National Congress. However the rivalry was finally laid to rest and there was union under the newly named African National Congress. One of the early aims of this movement was finally to lay to rest "the aberrations of the Xhosa-Fingo feud."

=== British annexation ===
British Kaffraria had been annexed to the Cape Colony in 1866. Barring the brief revolt in 1877 and 1878, when the Gcaleka turned upon their Fengu neighbours, the British annexation of land east of the Kei River proceeded fitfully, but generally unimpeded. In September 1879 this was followed by Idutywa Reserve and Fenguland, and Gcalekaland in 1885. It is assumed that the restructuring of these territories into the divisions of Butterworth, Idutywa, Centani, Nqamakwe, Tsomo and Willowvale dates from these times.

=== Social change and adaptability ===
Originally farmers, the Fengu people had quickly built themselves schools, created and edited their own newspapers, and translated international literature into their language. The reason that the Fengu people were able to adapt so effectively to changing circumstances (like the coming of capitalism and urbanisation) was because they lacked a fixed tribal social-structure and hierarchy (having presumably lost it in their earlier flight from the Zulu). This state of social change and flexibility allowed them to quickly adjust to the European expansion, learn and adapt new techniques, and take advantage of the upheavals that followed. Other tribes were often suspicious of outside ideas and consequently resisted any change to meet the colonial threat. The Fengu had no paramount-chief as other tribes did, but the Cape Commander, Veldman Bikitsha, was a Fengu and held authority over the Fengu's military capacity.

Many Fengu have also subsequently intermarried with other ethnic groups, particularly with the Xhosa and Zulu, while some still live in Zimbabwe.

== Territory ==
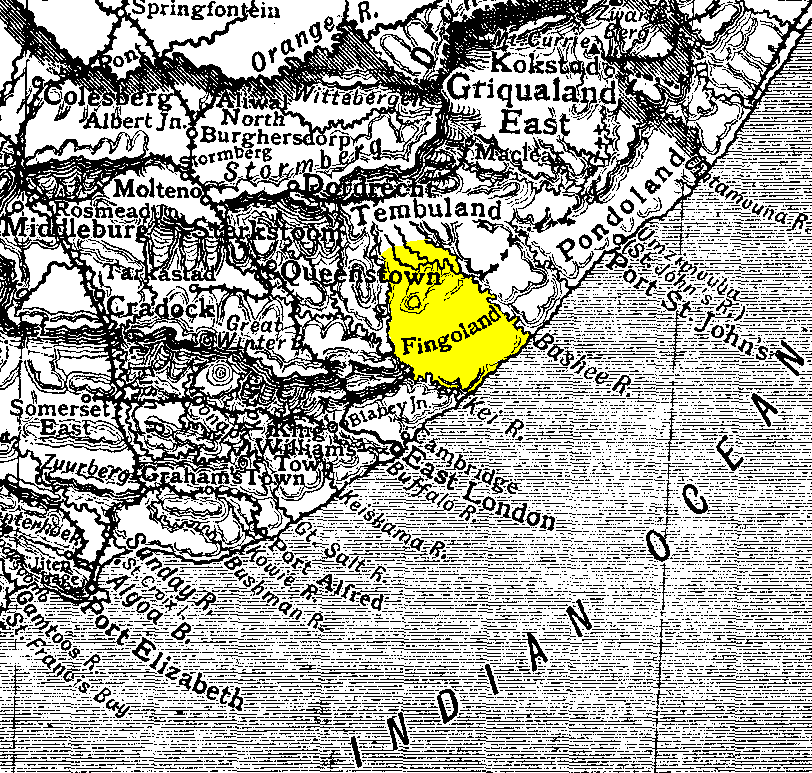
Map of Fingoland (highlighted), and surrounding regions of the Eastern Cape Frontier. 1911.

The region that was later known as the Transkei was originally divided into territories known as the Idutywa Reserve, Fingoland and Galekaland (Gcalekaland). Fingoland lay the borderlands in the far south of the Transkei, just north of the Kei River.

The dominant pretense is that following their annexation by the British, they were restructured into the divisions of Butterworth, Tsomo and Ngqamakwe for Fingoland; Centani and Willowvale for Galekaland; and Idutywa for the Idutywa Reserve.

== Present-day South Africa ==
Today virtually all the Fengu people have intermarried with other ethnic groups particularly with the Xhosa and Zulu. Many are now often considered – especially by outsiders – to be ethnically Xhosa and others Zulu, because of their common language and some similar customs. A considerable number have a mixed racial background, especially in and around the Cape provinces.

== See also ==
- Sandile kaNgqika
- Xhosa clan names
- Xhosa Wars
- Fingoland
- Fingo Festival
