= Burnshill =

- Location within Eastern Cape Location within South Africa
- Coordinates: 32.768°S 27.0571°E
- Country: South Africa
- Province: Eastern Cape
- District: Amathole
- Municipality: Amahlathi

Area
  - Total: 2.12 km^{2} (0.82 sq mi)

Population (2011)
  - Total: 693
  - Density: 327/km^{2} (847/sq mi)

Racial makeup (2011)
  - Black African: 99.7%
  - Other: 0.3%

First languages (2011)
  - Xhosa: 98.8%
  - Other: 1.2%
- Time zone: UTC+2 (SAST)
- PO box: 5688

Burnshill is a town in Amathole District Municipality in the Eastern Cape province of South Africa.

Former mission station of the Glasgow Missionary Society, established at the foot of the Amathole Mountains in 1831. Named after John Burns, minister of the Barony Church, Glasgow, one of the founders of the society. It was destroyed in 1851.
