= Ngqika =

Sub-group of the Xhosa people of South Africa

The Ngqika people are a Xhosa monarchy who lived west of the Great Kei River in what is today the Eastern Cape of South Africa. They were first ruled by Rarabe kaPhalo who died with his son Mlawu, who was destined for chieftaincy. The clan would be named after Ngqika ka Mlawu, the son of the then late Mlawu. It would be years before the child would rule his people who fought in the Xhosa Wars, which were sparked by the encroachment of European settlers on Xhosa lands.

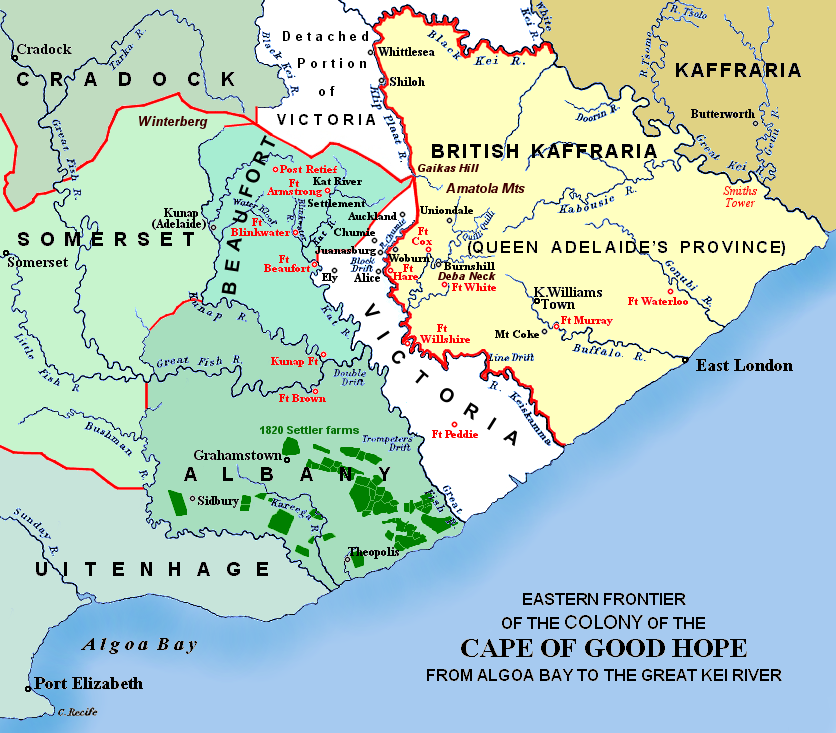
Eastern Frontier, Cape of Good Hope, ca 1835

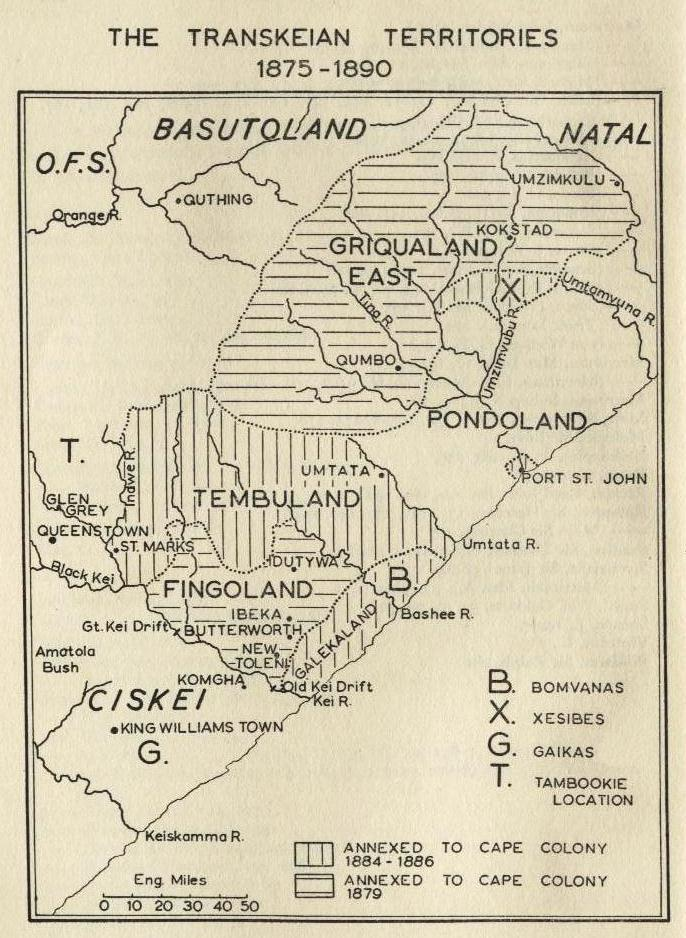
"Gaikas" on a map of the Transkei Cape frontier 1875-1890

The Dutch East India Company (VOC) that was responsible for trading and colonising of South African land in what is described as “founding” several urban areas like towns and cities in already populated areas of the west of South Africa. The organisation continually changed the boundaries in the Cape Colony due to European invasion and migration, establishing the Great Fish River as the eastern frontier in 1778.

In colonial times, the Ngqika lands were known as British Kaffraria. Later the Apartheid government of South Africa gave them a form of independence as the former "Ciskei" homeland.

The clan were referred to as “Gaika” people by the Europeans.

== Origins ==
=== Birth of a nation ===
Ngqika ka Mlawu was the first chief of the Ngqika and the third paramount chief of the Rharhabe Xhosas. He had nine wives. The clan was named after him when his grandfather (Rharhabe, the founder of the sub-group) and father (Mlawu, who was to be the next chief) both died in 1782. Ngqika, at only four years old, was too young to rule. Ndlambe (who would eventually establish the AmaNdlambe people) was Rharhabe's other son and Ngqika's uncle who became regent until the boy matured – in the tradition of the Xhosas. Ndlambe was responsible for the expansion of his tribe's territory and influence. He absorbed smaller clans (like the imiDange people) into the Ngqikas or expelled them to far lands. They were eventually invaded by European settlers from the Cape Colony who fought with them over their prime grazing land, west of the Great Kei River.

Encroachment by European settlers, beginning in the Dutch colonial period, resulted in the century of Xhosa Wars (commonly known as the Frontier Wars) from 1779 to 1879 involving Xhosa tribes (including the Ngqika), Khoikhoi and San people. Relations between the European invaders were fluid throughout this period with the varying indigenous people and Europeans working for or against one another to secure land, resources and cattle. These groups changed allies depending on who would help advance their objectives over the years. In 1793, in collaboration with other Xhosa clans, the Ngqikas fought against white settlers during the Second Frontier War.

In 1796, Ngqika turned 18 and was ready to assume his rightful place on the throne, but his uncle was reluctant to give up power. Ndlambe appealed to the tribe to retain his power but this failed. His nephew imprisoned him a year later in an attempt to stifle his power. When he escaped across the Great Fish River in 1799 with his supporters, he attempted to collude with the Cape Colony's white government to overthrow Ngqika, but the colony continued to recognise his nephew as the paramount chief.

Ngqika ka Mlawu died in November 1829 after a chest illness and alcohol abuse.

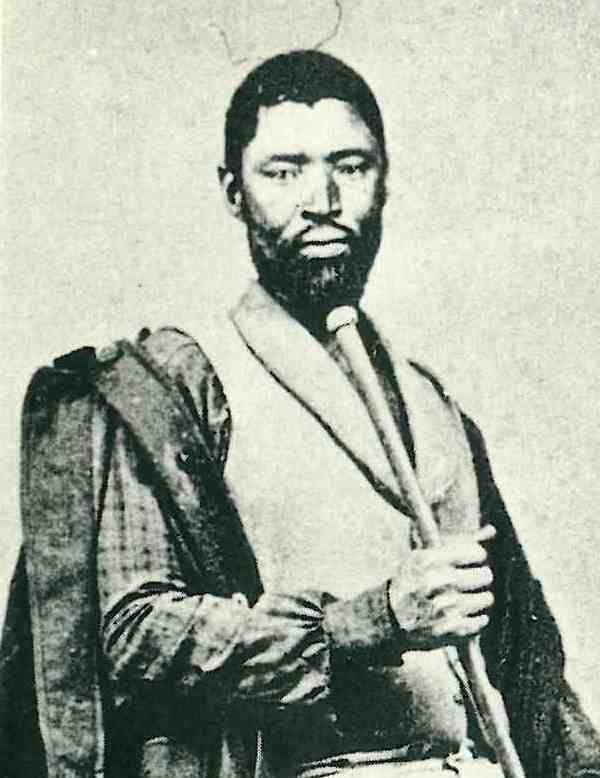
Sandile kaNgqika - Xhosa Chief

=== List of chiefs during Xhosa Wars ===
Sandile kaNgqika the rightful heir of Ngqika, was only nine years old when his father died. Maqoma, born to Ngqika and Nomvakalisa Nothontho of the Ngqosini, was the chief's eldest son but because Sandile's mother was a descendant of abaThembu (a royal lineage). Her first son was thus considered the “Great Son”. Maqoma became regent until Sandile was ready to rule. The following is a list of chiefs of the Ngqika that ruled during the Xhosa Wars starting with Sandile's great grandfather, Rharhabe:

- Rharhabe: lived 1778 (as the leader of the Rharhabe people) – 1782, ruled 1796 - 1782
- Ngqika kaMlawu: lived 1778 – 1829, ruled 1796 - 1829
- Sandile kaNgqika: lived 1820 – 1878, ruled 1841 - 1878

The native groups lost most of their land and were absorbed into the Cape Colony during this century. The Xhosa eventually lost access to the fertile land between the Great Kei River and Great Fish River to encroaching European settlers.

== See also ==
- Albany, South Africa
- History of Cape Colony from 1806 to 1870
- British Kaffraria
- Kaffraria
- Military history of South Africa
- Sandile kaNgqika
- The Battle of Amalinde
- Great Kei River
- Great Fish River
