= Winnie Kgware =

Winnie Motlalepula Kgware (1917 – 1998) was a South African anti-Apartheid activist within the Black Consciousness Movement (BCM). She was elected as the first president of the Black People's Convention (BPC), a BCM-affiliated community-based organisation in 1972.

== Early life ==
Winnie Kgware was born in Thaba 'Nchu in the Orange Free State in 1917. Growing up in the racially divided Free State, before the institutionalisation of racism through Apartheid, she was politically inclined and encouraged the youth to be active in political structures. Heeding her call, the youth formed a branch of the South African Student Movement and established a School Representative Council (SRC) at Hwiti High School, where struggle icon Peter Mokaba was elected SRC President. As a result of this, when he was only 15 years old, Kgware recruited Peter Mokaba to join the underground movement. Mokaba was subsequently expelled from Hwiti High School because of his involvement in the struggle for liberation. After completing his matric as a private candidate, he did not have funds to pursue tertiary education and as such opted to teach mathematics and sciences at a local school. Kgware intervened and assisted her political mentee with funds to study at university, where he enrolled for a Bachelor of Science in Computer Technology.

== Political life ==
Kgware (then still Winnie Monyatsi) was trained as a teacher and later married Professor WM Kgware, who was appointed the first black rector at the University of the North (Turfloop), where she then took up residence. With the campus being the heart of Black Conscious ideas, Kgware became involved in supporting students in their protests against the Government's restrictions on campus. One of her earliest acts was to organise a Methodist prayer group in defiance of an order that banned students from worshipping on campus. Beyond this, she gave sustenance to the student movement and allowed her and her husband's residence to be used as a meeting place for the University Christian Movement (UCM), an organisation that was banned from the campus at the time. Regardless of the age gap between her and her fellow activists, she played a leading role in the launch of the South African Students’ Organisation (SASO) in 1968, after its breakaway from the UCM, due to discontent by black activists (including Steve Biko) with the UCM's all-white national executive committee. In 1972, the Black People's Convention (BPC) had its first national conference in Hammanskraal from 16 to 17 December, with over 1400 delegates in attendance representing 154 groups. At that conference, Winnie Kgware, Madibeng Mokoditoa, Sipho Buthelezi, Mosubudi Mangena and Saths Cooper emerged as president, vice-president, secretary-general, national organiser and public relations officer respectively, making up the inaugural national executive committee of the BPC, an umbrella body of the Black Consciousness Movement then led by Steve Biko. On 19 October 1977, a few weeks after Steve Biko’s murder in police custody, 18 BCM-affiliated organisations were banned by the South African government, with BPC amongst these. One incident that stands out in the portrayal of Kgware's sheer determination to render the Apartheid system ungovernable occurred in 1977 when the bus-taking mourners to Steve Biko’s funeral in Ginsberg, outside of King Williams Town, were stopped by security forces. Kgware, then 66 years old, evaded the police and hitched a lift all the way to King Williams Town to attend Biko's funeral. Some of the lesser-known women with whom Kgware led and served with in the Black Consciousness Movement include Mamphela Ramphele, Deborah Matshoba, Oshadi Mangena, and Nomsizi Kraai. After a long life of teaching and activist work, Kgware died in 1998 at home in North West- Bophuthatswana.

== Accolades ==
In 1998, the Umtapo Centre in Durban, which claims to be inspired by the philosophy of Black Consciousness and founded in memory of the BCM and AZAPO leader Strini Moodley, awarded the Steve Biko Award to Kgware in recognition of her role in the liberation struggle. Later on, in 2003, then President Thabo Mbeki conferred, post-humously, the Order of Luthuli to Winnie Kgware for outstanding leadership and lifelong commitment to the ideals of democracy, non-racialism, peace and justice.

== See also ==
- South African History Online
- Black Consciousness Movement
