= Nkwenkwe Nkomo =

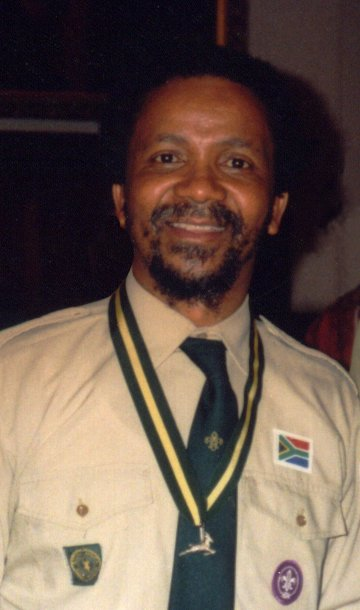
- Nkwenkwe Nkomo as Chief Scout of South Africa in 1997

Chief Scout, South African Scout Association
- In office 1995–2005
- Preceded by: Garnet de la Hunt
- Succeeded by: Vukile Mehana

Nkwenkwe Nkomo of South Africa is the group deputy chairman of FCB SA, South Africa's largest marketing communication group, and chairperson of the Advertising Standards Authority (ASA) of South Africa. He also served as one of 12 elected volunteer members of the World Scout Committee, the main executive body of the World Organization of the Scout Movement. As an anti-apartheid student activist in the 1970s, he was one of the so-called "SASO nine" imprisoned on Robben Island for six years.

Nkomo speaks nine South African languages. "That came through living in the township, not through a formal program," says Nkomo. Nkwenkwe is Xhosa for "little boy", and Nkomo means "cow", so his name means "cowboy".

Nkomo always wears a signature fez perched on his head.

== South African Students' Organisation ==
In the 1970s, Nkomo was active in opposition to the apartheid system in South Africa. He was a student leader in the South African Students' Organisation (SASO), which broke away from the National Union of South African Students (NUSAS), and a national organiser of the Black People's Convention. He and eight other SASO leaders (known as the "SASO nine") were arrested in 1974 and charged with "conspiring to overturn the state by unconstitutional means". The Black Consciousness leader Steve Biko testified at length in his defence, a year before Biko was beaten to death by security policemen. The accused (including Strini Moodley and Mosiuoa Lekota) were convicted and sentenced to prison. Nkomo spent two years in prison while on trial and six years on Robben Island, in the same prison as Nelson Mandela and many other anti-apartheid leaders.

== Career in advertising ==
NN, as he is known to colleagues, is the group deputy chairman of FCB SA, South Africa's largest marketing communication group. When he was released from prison on 20 December 1982, Len van Zyl of what was then Lindsay Smithers took him on as a junior copywriter. He rose to creative director, a position he held for seven years, before being appointed group deputy chairman in 1995. His core functions center on corporate transformation, new business development, key client contacts and industry matters.

In 2007, Nkomo was appointed chairperson of the Advertising Standards Authority (ASA) of South Africa. He was also the deputy chairperson of the 2010 National Communication Partnership for the 2010 FIFA World Cup hosted in South Africa.

== Scouting ==
He served two five-year terms as Chief Scout of South Africa, from 1996 to 2005, of which he says, "As Chief Scout I am chief servant". Nkwenkwe Nkomo was elected at the 37th World Scout Conference held September 2005 in Yasmine Hammamet, Tunisia, for a six-year term, along with five other members from a field of 15 candidates from around the world. Nkomo was the second South African to be elected to the World Scout Committee; Garnet de la Hunt was a member from 1996 to 2002 and held the post of chairman of the committee.

Nkomo joined the Daveyton 7th Cub Scout pack in 1957, when there were four separate associations for whites, coloureds, Indians and blacks whose association was called "Pathfinders". He was chairman for several years of the Daveyton Residents Committee, which had a projects committee that identified needs in the area and raised funds for development. One of the requests presented to the committee was by the Scouts. When their presentation failed to meet standards, Nkomo helped them re-work their presentation, resulting in the committee's decision to build a Scout hall in the community. In 1991, he was approached by Colin Adcock, then chief executive of Toyota (one of Lindsay Smithers' clients) who had been asked to put together a marketing program for the South African Scout Association. He made a presentation to a Scout conference, and was then asked to "rejoin the movement", as Assistant Chief Scout. "One of the reasons I agreed to return to Scouting was the challenge to take it back to the community. Scouting is a premium youth movement, there to enable us, especially now, to move towards healing this country, to train leaders and empower people."

World Organization of the Scout Movement
Preceded by Garnet de la Hunt	Chief Scout, South African Scout Association; 1995–2005	Succeeded by Vukile Mehana
