= Mthuli ka Shezi =

South African activist

- Born: Mthuli Nicodemus Shezi; 1947
- Died: 1972 (aged 24–25)
- Cause of death: Pushed into an ongoing train after defending African women from a white station cleaner
- Occupations: Playwright and Anti-apartheid activist
- Organization(s): South African Students' Organization, Black People's Convention
- Father: Ambrose Shezi

Mthuli ka Shezi (1947–1972) was a South African playwright and political activist. At the University of Zululand, he was a student activist who would later be elected the first vice president of the Black People's Convention in 1972. His writing reflected the struggle of recovering African identity in colonial and post-colonial societies, a topic which shaped his involvement in Steve Biko's Black Consciousness Movement and its dramatic sub-culture.

In December 1972, Shezi died when he was pushed in front of a moving train at Germiston station after coming to the defense of African women being drenched with water by a white station cleaner. He posthumously received the Order of Luthuli for his "political leadership, outstanding contribution to the performing arts, and activism against apartheid."

He is considered by many to be the first martyr of the Black Consciousness Movement as well as a symbol for the struggle of Black South Africans against the apartheid regime.

== Career ==
=== The South African Student's Organization ===
Attending the University of Zululand at the time, Shezi was among the group of university students that started the South African Student's Organization (SASO). The students united across multiple college campuses in 1969 to address developments in the apartheid regime, including the Sharpeville Massacre, the establishment of segregated Bantu Education, and the banning of the Pan Africanist Congress (PAC) alongside the African National Congress (ANC), accompanied by the exile of their key leaders. With the overall increase in laws amplifying apartheid and restricting opposition from Black South Africans during the 1960s, the students set out to develop a counter-culture that would combat their effect by empowering their communities "psychologically, socially, materially, spiritually, and politically."

==== The Influence of Paulo Freire's Writing on SASO ====
SASO developed politically specific community programming to promote self-determination among Black South Africans. The writings of the famed Brazilian educator and Marxist philosopher, Paulo Freire, especially provided critical frameworks for their community action. Through publications such as his seminal work, Pedagogy of the Oppressed, Freire described insights from years of work throughout Brazil where he developed public programming to engage the urban and rural working class through both youth and adult education, festivals, and plays. His texts emphasized most the value of working alongside communities with belief in their potential to provide for themselves when made aware of their condition and given the right tools to alter their own circumstances.

SASO then took it upon themselves to replicate his methodologies in their own fashion, with a goal of equipping their communities with the right tools to achieve self-sufficiency. To initiate their plan of action, they conducted a literacy campaign in 1971, contracting the help of Anne Hope, a white South African activist and member of the international Catholic women's organization, the Grail. She had become familiar with Freire's frameworks through her scholarship and, upon some convincing, agreed to assist the SASO students in their campaign. Shezi was a part of the original group in this initiative alongside "Deborah Matshoba, Barney Pityana, Welile Nhlapo, Steve Biko, Strini Moodley, Mosibudi Mangena, Johnny Issel, Saths Cooper, Dumo Baqwa, Bokwe Mafuna and Tebogo Mafole, among others." Moving beyond the literacy campaign, SASO continued to center their work around collecting data from their communities to most accurately support their needs.

=== The Black Consciousness Movement ===
The Black Consciousness Movement (BCM) was a grassroots movement that resisted apartheid by encouraging Africans to unite under a shared Black cultural identity while promoting principles of self-determination via intellectual means. It was developed by SASO and led by Steve Biko, taking inspiration from African diasporic scholarship including Frantz Fanon's Black Skin, White Masks (1967) and W. E. B. Du Bois' theory of Double Consciousness. A critique of the BCM is that it often romanticized precolonial Africa as an organic representation of the freedoms sought by their campaigns. Retrospective evaluations of the movement have considered the limitations of viewing Africa's past as a destination to return to. Notwithstanding, campaigns oriented around African ancestral lands became a key point of cultural unity between Pan-African movements throughout the African diaspora.

==== The Black Theater ====
Born out of the Black Consciousness Movement was a distinctive theater campaign of its own. From an aesthetic standpoint, its qualities both constructed and promoted a continental African cultural identity, characterized by titles such as "Black theatre" (Steve Biko), African national theater (Mafika Gwala), and Abibigoro (Mohammed Ben Abdallah), which is Akan for 'Black theatre or theatre of African People.' Plays like Shezi's Shanti (1981) additionally shaped the aesthetics of this theatrical practice.

Constantly prepared to face state oppression in response to their political activism, dramatists associated with the BCM adapted the theater to operate on the go. Mthuli ka Shezi and his peers practiced a model of street theater that could be set up and taken down fast enough to outpace local apartheid authorities. This level of mobility was considered necessary by the facilitators and participants alike, who often were at risk of arrest and brutality during apartheid.

Additionally, Shezi's theater, like many contemporary African dramatic cultures, has been reported to hold observable cultural retentions that connect back to ancient storytelling traditions practiced throughout the African continent. For example, a longstanding trend among the beginnings of stories in African theater is a shared role of narration amongst a collective to properly orient the audience. This technique entails the group alternating between individuals to deliver lines as well as reciting them together as a chorus. It has been identified as ngonjera, a Swahili phrase evoking an East African tradition that is comparable to that of West African griots, who have become well known by western literature in the twenty-first century. In this fashion, the Black Consciousness Movement constructed its theater program utilizing the universality of storytelling traditions throughout the continent to support its mission of Pan-African unity and identity building.

==== Shanti (1981) ====
Shezi's Shanti (1981) was one of key influential plays to connect South African expressive cultures to the shared ontology of a "global Black experience," alongside the Theater Council of Netal (TECON)'s Requirem for Brother X, Lewis Nkosi's The Rhythm of Violence (1964), and Kuldip Sondhi's Encounter. This shared culture found the internationalism of figures like Malcolm X to be compelling amongst both African American and South African crowds, particularly following his assassination. Intense emotional responses to this event and similar experiences of "Black oppression" were seen as points of connection between members of the movement, who were compelled to take action in ways most accessible to them. Correspondingly, it has been shown that patterns of Black nationalist community-based initiatives, such as those organized by the North American Black Panther Party, became the model for similar institutions overseas. Black Community Programs (BCP), the Black Allied Workers Union (BAWU), and other groups emerged from SASO, leading to new public programs including the 'Black theatre.'

The play features didactic moments of direct dialogue between the characters and their audience. Shezi often utilized these asides to reinforce foundational identities and ideologies emerging from the Black Consciousness Movement. By focusing on simple, straight forward declarations in the midst of complex plot lines, the script aimed to disrupt genre conventions as part of a broader counter-culture created by the movement. Departing from dramatic cultures with liberal humanist sensibilities, BCM playwrights presented their audiences with more militant rhetoric.

== Quote ==
"I am black/ Black like my mother/ Black like the sufferers/ Black like the continent" - from the play Shanti published in 1972
