= Pandelani Nefolovhodwe =

South African politician

Member of the National Assembly
- In office February 2002 – May 2009

Personal details
- Born: 2 February 1947 (age 79) Folovhodwe, Northern Transvaal; Union of South Africa
- Party: Azanian People's Organisation
- Education: University of the North; University of South Africa; De Montfort University

Pandelani Jeremia Nefolovhodwe (born 2 February 1947) is a South African politician and former anti-apartheid activist who served as deputy president of the Azanian People's Organisation (AZAPO) from 1992 to 2010. He represented the party in the National Assembly from 2002 to 2009 and was formerly its president from 1990 to 1992.

During apartheid, Nefolovhodwe was a leading member of the Black Consciousness movement, particularly at the University of the North at Turfloop. He was national president of the South African Students' Organisation (SASO) in 1974, when he and eight others were charged under the Terrorism Act in the SASO Nine trial. He was imprisoned on Robben Island from 1976 to 1982 and upon his release became involved in union organising, including as a founding member of the National Council of Trade Unions.

== Early life and activism ==
Nefolovhodwe was born on 2 February 1947 in the village of Folovhodwe in the former Northern Transvaal. He attended the University of the North, where he was elected to the student representative council in 1971. He was politically active in the Black Consciousness movement and was involved in the student protests at Turfloop in 1972, leading to his expulsion from the university. In 1972–73, he worked as a welfare officer at Musina Copper Mine and then as an assistant teacher in Venda until he was readmitted to the University of the North.

=== Trial and conviction ===
In 1974, Nefolovhodwe was elected as president of the student representative council and as national president of the Black Consciousness-aligned South African Students' Organisation (SASO). In September of that year, he was involved in planning SASO's historic pro-Frelimo rally in Durban, and he was one of several SASO leaders arrested by the Security Branch in the aftermath. He and eight others were charged with violations of the Terrorism Act and became known as the SASO Nine. After a prolonged and highly publicised trial in the Pretoria Supreme Court, all nine were convicted in December 1976. Nefolovhodwe was sentenced to six years' imprisonment, which he served on Robben Island.

=== Unions and AZAPO ===
After his release in 1982, Nefolovhodwe resumed his political activism and joined the Black Consciousness-aligned Black Allied Mining and Construction Workers Union; he was elected its secretary-general in 1984. He was also a founding member of the National Council of Trade Unions in 1986 and was elected its inaugural assistant secretary-general. He also joined the Azanian People's Organisation (AZAPO) and served as AZAPO president from 1990 until 1992, when he became AZAPO deputy president.

Simultaneously he was the coordinator for labour studies at the Ubuntu Social Development Institute from 1988 to 1994. He also completed a Bachelor of Science from the University of South Africa and a Master of Business Administration from De Montfort University.

== Post-apartheid political career ==
Nefolovhodwe remained AZAPO deputy president from 1992 until 2010, but after the democratic transition he worked in development and in the private sector, chairing the Imbumba Group until 2001. He was a staunch advocate for land reform in South Africa.

In February 2002, AZAPO announced that Nefolovhodwe would be sworn into the party's sole seat in the National Assembly, the lower house of the South African Parliament. He replaced AZAPO president Mosibudi Mangena, who had resigned from Parliament after being appointed Deputy Minister of Education. Nefolovhodwe was re-elected to a full term in the assembly in the 2004 general election. During the legislative term that followed, he also served on the Pan-African Parliament.

He ceded his legislative seat in the 2009 general election and ceded his office as AZAPO deputy president in March 2010. However, he did briefly return to frontline politics during the 2019 general election, in which he stood unsuccessfully on AZAPO's list for election to the National Assembly. In May 2016, he was appointed to a four-year term as chairperson of the council of his alma mater, by then restructured as the University of Limpopo. He was also a member of the Robben Island Museum Council.
