= I Write What I Like =

1978 book of writings by Steve Biko

- First edition
- Editor: Aelred Stubbs
- Author: Steve Biko
- Publisher: Bowderdean Press

I Write What I Like (full name I Write What I Like: Selected Writings by Steve Biko) is a compilation of writings from anti-apartheid activist Steve Biko.

I Write What I Like contains a selection of Biko's writings from 1969, when he became the president of the South African Student Organisation, to 1972, when he was prohibited from publishing. Originally published in 1978, the book was republished in 1987 and April 2002. The book's title was taken from the title under which he had published his writings in the SASO newsletter under the pseudonym Frank Talk.

I Write What I Like reflects Biko's conviction that black people in South Africa could not be liberated until they united to break their chains of servitude, a key tenet of the Black Consciousness Movement that he helped found.

The collection was edited by Aelred Stubbs. The book includes a preface by Archbishop Desmond Tutu; an introduction by Malusi and Thoko Mpumlwana, who were both involved with Biko in the Black Consciousness Movement; a memoir of Biko by Father Aelred Stubbs, his longtime pastor and friend; and a new foreword by Professor Lewis Gordon.
