= Abram Ramothibi Onkgopotse Tiro =

South African activist

Onkgopotse Tiro
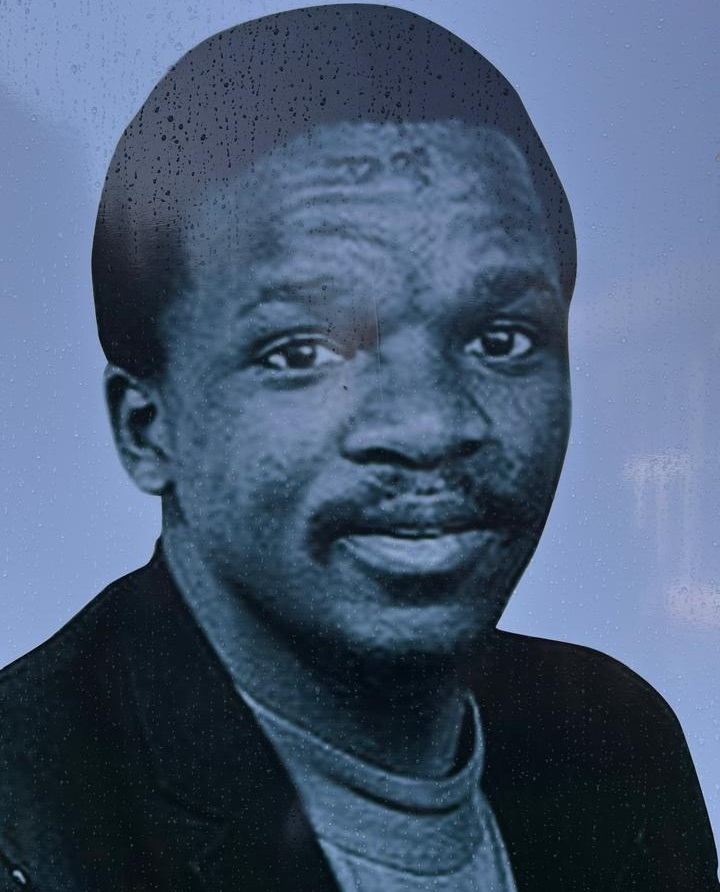
- Born: Onkgopotse Abram Tiro; 9 November 1945; Dinokana, Zeerust, North West, South Africa
- Died: 1 February 1974 (aged 28); Botswana
- Occupation: Anti-apartheid activist

Abram Ramothibi Onkgopotse Tiro (born 9 November 1945 – 1 February 1974) was a South African student activist and black consciousness militant.

== Early life ==
Tiro was born in Dinokana, a small village near Zeerust in present-day North West Province. He was the first son of Nkokwe Peter Tiro and Moleseng Anna Tiro; he had two younger brothers and one sister. His mother, a deeply religious single mother, worked as a domestic servant in Emmarentia, Johannesburg, while little is recorded about his father. Tiro was raised by his grandmother. From an early age he spent time with his uncle, Ned Onkgopotse Tiro (after whom he was named), and his aunt Bafedile Masoba, assisting with their bakery business—an experience that nurtured his organisational and leadership skills.

As a boy he played soccer, swam in the local river, herded goats and cattle, and assisted in his uncle’s bakery. Tiro became a vegetarian in primary school after advice from his pastor to eat healthily. As a Devout Seventh-day Adventist, he attended church every Saturday. Dinokana’s history of resistance (land-rights conflicts) and its role as an “underground railroad” for anti-apartheid exiles shaped his early political consciousness.

Tiro grew up in the relative poverty of a “hand to mouth existence” and was brought up as a Seventh Day Adventist.

== Primary and secondary education ==
Tiro began his schooling in 1951 at Ikalafeng Primary School. When the school closed for five months due to women’s pass-law protests, he worked as a dishwasher and general hand at a manganese mine—earning 75 cents per week—to help fund his studies. After Ikalafeng, he enrolled briefly at Naledi High School in Soweto but was arrested for a pass offence. He then completed his secondary education at Barolong High School in Mafikeng, where he matriculated. It took him 17 years to finish school (finished in 1968) instead of the usual 12 to complete his schooling due to these disruptions.

== University activism ==
In 1968 Tiro enrolled for a Bachelor of Arts in Humanities at the University of the North (now University of Limpopo). While there, he drew on writers such as Frantz Fanon and Jean-Paul Sartre and leaders like Kenneth Kaunda and Julius Nyerere; aligned with the US Black Power movement. He sought an Adventist church in a nearby town, only to be turned away because it was “for whites only.” In his final year he was elected President of the Student Representative Council (SRC). At the graduation ceremony on 29 April 1972 he delivered what became known as the “Turfloop Testimony”, a blistering critique of the 1953 Bantu Education Act and apartheid policies. The university authorities expelled him on the spot, triggering solidarity strikes at black campuses nationwide—in May and June 1972, including at the University of Cape Town on 2 June. Shortly after the banning of senior South African Students Organisation (SASO) and Black People's Convention (BPC) leaders in 1973, Tiro was appointed Permanent Organiser of the SASO and was elected President of the Southern African Students’ Movement (SASM), an affiliate of the All-Africa Students’ Union.

The University of the North had been set up exclusively for black students but was managed by whites. In the “Turfloop Testimony” as it became known. Tiro criticised both apartheid and the Bantu Education Act for requiring black students to undertake some of their education in Afrikaans.

== Memorandum Movement ==
He led a campaign to decolonise the Seventh-day Adventist church: its “Memorandum Movement” secured adult education programmes and, for the first time, elected a black pastor as president of the Southern Union.

== Teaching career and “cradle of resistance” ==
Following his expulsion, Tiro was offered a history teaching post at Morris Isaacson High School in Jabavu, in 1973, Soweto, by Headmaster Lekgau Mathabathe. There he introduced his pupils to Black Consciousness philosophy and led a campaign encouraging them to question the Department of Bantu Education’s prescribed history textbooks. Under his guidance Morris Isaacson became known as the “cradle of resistance” and produced future leaders such as Tsietsi Mashinini, a key organiser of the 1976 Soweto uprising. Many of his students have recalled his impact on their own politicisation during this period of student organisation in South African history. In early 1973, he was dismissed after a white school inspector ordered him to stop teaching; official reasoning cited lack of funds.

The later Afrikaans Medium Decree of 1974, which required schoolchildren to receive 50% of their education in Afrikaans has been recognised as a contributing factor to the Soweto uprising in 1976.

== Exile, affiliations and assassination ==
By late 1973 the South African security police were preparing to arrest him. Tiro fled to Botswana, settling at the Roman Catholic Mission in Khale, about 20 km from Gaborone, where he continued to organise for SASO, SASM and the Black Peoples’ Convention, and even forged contacts with the Palestinian Liberation Organisation. While completing an application to study with UNISA, he was handed a parcel bomb—allegedly sent by an agent known only as “Lawrence”—which exploded on 1 February 1974 and killed him instantly. His body was buried in Botswana because the apartheid government refused repatriation. However, the apartheid government proposed for his body to be buried in South Africa if; 1) he can be buried in a steel coffin and; 2) only his family can attend the funeral. Only on 20 March 1998, with support from Azanian People's Organisation (AZAPO) and the Truth and Reconciliation Commission (TRC), were his remains returned to South Africa; he was finally reburied in Dinokana on 22 March 1998. Former Bureau of State Security (BOSS) spy Gordon Winter later revealed that Tiro had been targeted by BOSS’s covert “Z-Squad” unit; the TRC did not formally investigate.

Botswana authorities did not cooperate with investigations; his mother’s 2003 plea to the TRC went unanswered “Tell the world that the government has forgotten about us — the victims,” she told Drum.

== Legacy and memorialisation ==
=== University of Limpopo ===
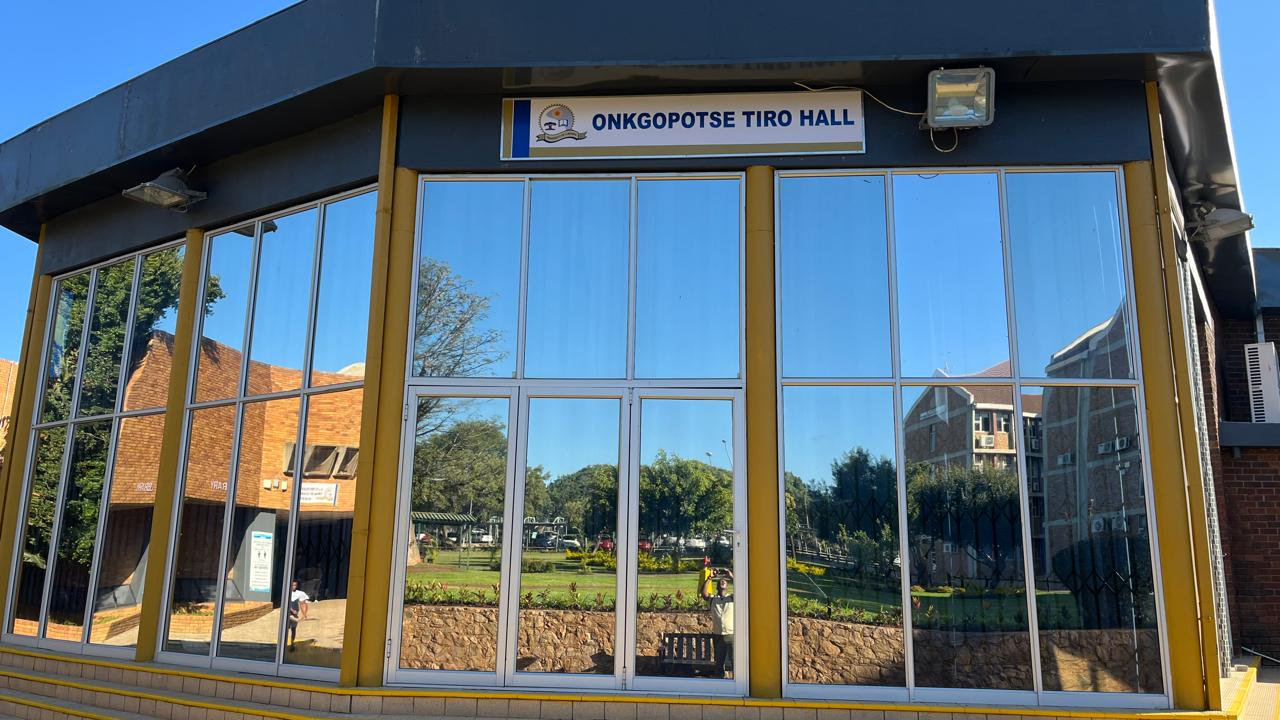
Tiro Hall at University of Limpopo

- Tiro has a hall named in his honour at the University of Limpopo. Beyond naming Tiro Hall, the campus also endowed a bursary scheme, an academic excellence award and a student residence in his name; hosts an annual Onkgopotse Tiro Memorial Lecture.
- The inaugural lecture, delivered in 2012 by Reuel Khoza, honoured Tiro’s legacy by highlighting his “courage, consciousness, conscientiousness, commitment, caring, compassion and passion, a sense of destiny and vision, and a bias for action.”

=== Influence on later student movements ===
- #FeesMustFall (2015–) organisers explicitly cited Tiro’s 1972 protest; in August 2018 Mcebo Dlamini walked from Joburg to Pretoria wearing a T-shirt featuring Tiro’s image alongside Biko and Sobukwe.

=== Ongoing scholarship ===
- Mojuta Motlhamme’s 2018 social biography emphasises Tiro’s presence “in the intergenerational memory of South Africans” and his relevance to student activism past and present.
