= Zanempilo Community Health Care Centre =

Health care center in Zinyoka, South Africa

Zanempilo Community Health Care Centre (ZCHC), also known as the "Biko Clinic", was the first primary health care centre initiative outside of the public sector in South Africa. It is located in Zinyoka Village, near King William's Town in the Eastern Cape. The clinic was established as one of the Black Community Programmes (BCPs) spearheaded by Steve Biko and Mamphela Ramphele.

== Purpose ==
"Zanempilo" meaning "bringing health" in isiXhosa, operated from 1974 to 1977 and aimed to improve the physical health of the community, assist with economic growth and restore a sense of dignity for black people. It took an holistic approach to treating health problems in the community by considering the environment and living conditions of the patients. The Black Consciousness Movement became active from the 1960s to the 1970s after the ANC and PAC were banned by the South African government. The South African Students Movement, SASO had limitations as a student movement therefore, the Black Consciousness Movement created a numerous political and community organisations like the Zanempilo Community Health Care Centre in order to expand the movement. At the time, residents in the Ciskei region experienced the negative effects of the migrant labour system, state neglect, decreasing agricultural sustainability (as many young skilled men had left to work in the mines), inadequate health services and an influx of people due to forced removals.

== Zinyoka Community ==
The village of Zinyoka in the Ciskei experienced all of these challenges with rural health clinics scattered approximately 20 kilometres apart. These clinics lacked medical supplies and staff members. Grey Hospital in King William's Town was mostly used for white patients. The hospitals that allowed black people were the Mission Hospital, Mt Coke Mission Hospital and St Matthews Mission which were far away and poorly resourced. The Zanempilo Community Health Care Centre mainly served people from the surrounding rural areas. These were mostly women who were either domestic workers or relied on their husbands' wages from mining. Research and statistics done be ZCHCC staff found that the "average" Zinyoka family consisted of an average of 6 people. Each family earned an income of R5-R10 per week and the families consisted mostly of women and children. Most of the men were over the age of 50 (as younger men were at work).

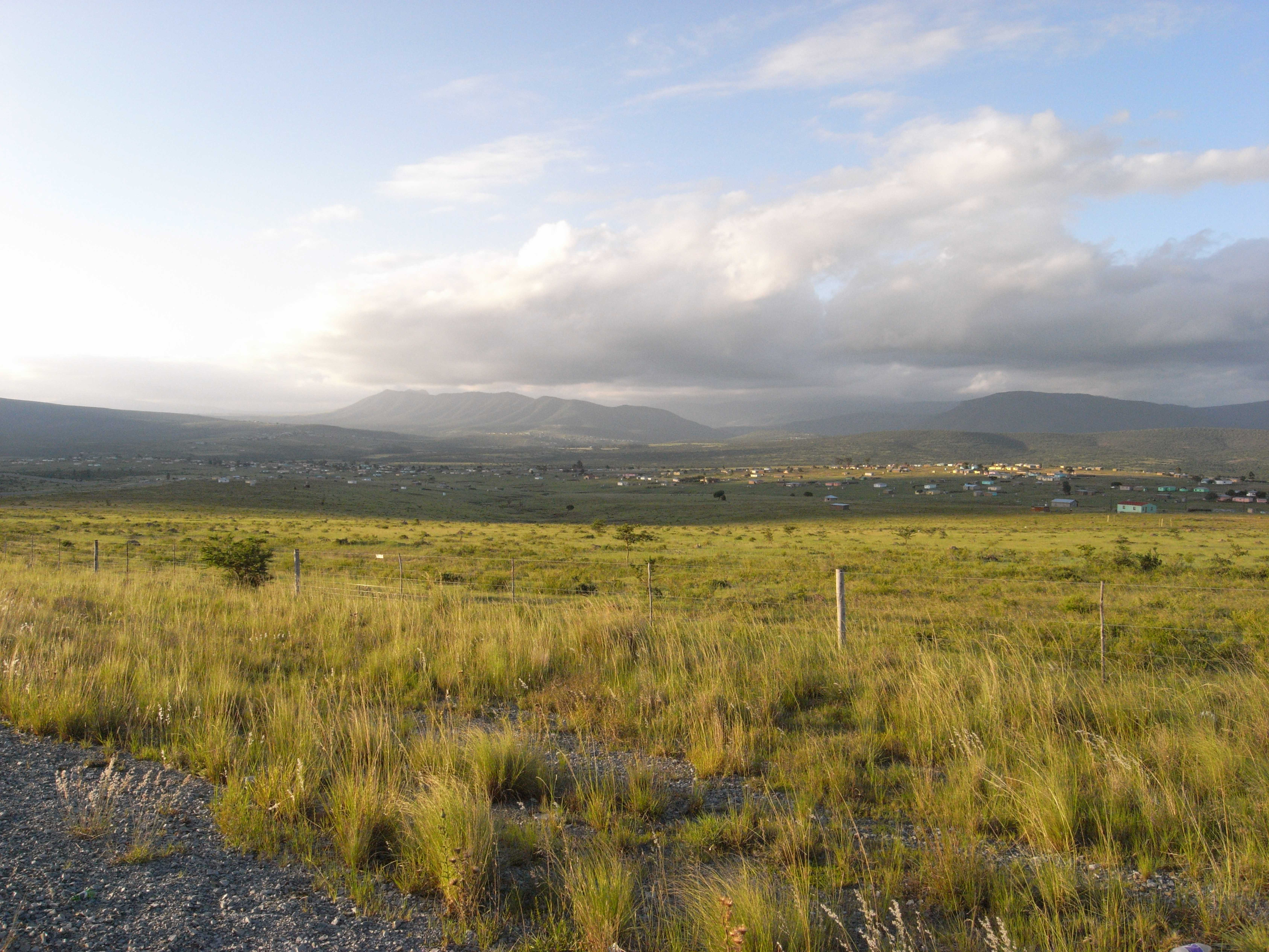
A village in the Ciskei near King William's Town

== Funding ==
The startup funding came from Angela Mai, a German citizen born in South Africa, who approached the BCP with between R20 000 - R30 000. The South African Council of Churches (SACC) assisted in running costs. The clinic opened in January 1975.

== Staff ==
- Mamphela Ramphele is a qualified medical practitioner who worked at Mt Coke hospital and joined Zanempilo as the head medical officer. Dr. Ramphele was permanently on duty for the first year of the project and earned a salary of R600 per month. Ramphele was restricted to Tzaneen in 1977 which forced her to end her tenure at Zanempilo.
- Steve Biko was the regional director of the BCP. After his expulsion from medical school, the government restricted Biko to King William's Town in the hopes of ending his influence. However, Biko joined the BCP and directed his political activity there. The government was unaware for quite some time that the BCPs were associated with the Black Consciousness Movement. Biko often came to Zanempilo to avoid police surveillance and frequently held meetings with members of the ANC and PAC. Students from Fort Hare spent their holidays assisting at Zanempilo.
- Nontombeko Moletsane was one of the 2 nursing staff sisters that Ramphele recruited from Mt Coke hospital.
- Beauty Nongauza was one of the 2 nursing sisters that Ramphele recruited from Mt Coke Hospital.
- Dr Siyolo Solombela joined the clinic after completing his internship duties at Livingstone Hospital in Port Elizabeth.
- Stanley Roji was the watchman of the clinic and reported police disguising themselves as sick patients in order to spy on the political activists in the clinic.
- Mziwoxolo Ndzengu was the resident ambulance driver from Ginsberg.
- Mr Flask was the local builder who rushed to have the clinic completed by the end of 1974. He also built the staff house where Ramphele lived for the reasonable cost of R4000.

== Facilities ==
The health care centre was built on the land of an Anglican church. The ZCHCC provided:

- an outpatient section for minor and major ailments
- a maternity section with an antenatal clinic, labour ward, nursery and lie-in ward for mothers after delivery
- a panel van which functioned as an ambulance and a mobile clinic to access further distances

These services were available 24 hours a day, 7 days a week and throughout the year. The facility expanded and was fully equipped with beds, flushing toilets, electricity and clean water, amenities that many of the residents of Zinyoka were unaccustomed to. Zanempilo not only functioned as a health facility, but also as a political meeting point, training ground for activists, community centre to discuss problems and place of events and celebrations. The facility had many visitors ranging from neighbouring villagers, political activists, businessmen, philanthropists, international visitors and the security police.

== Projects ==
Nontombeko Moletsane initiated a bulk grocery buying scheme. Child mortality decreased after the nutrition of the community improved. She also started a leather factory which provided many of the women with income.

== Resistance ==
The headman and chief in Zinyoka, Sidoko Sijama, under the chief of Tshatshu, was against the operations of the clinic. Many of the members of the Ciskei government were afraid that this clinic would cause conflict with the authorities. A rival clinic was built but it did not succeed. Other attempts to end the operations of the clinic included withholding the operating licence and not allowing the clinic access to free immunisations for children.

== Closure ==
Two weeks after the death of Steve Biko, on the 17 October 1977, all black consciousness organisations including the BCPs were banned. Two days after this ban, authorities confiscated all the assets of the clinic. They also destroyed the leather work factory and placed the Zanempilo clinic under government control. Additionally, all clinic programmes were cancelled, it no longer offered 24 hour care, it was not open on weekends, it lost supplies and no longer provided ambulatory services.

== Legacy ==
The success of the ZCHCC led to the initiation of a similar project at the South coast of Natal called Sonempilo meaning "Eye of Health" however, the banning of black consciousness organisations led to the closure of this facility in 1977. During Mamphela Ramphele's time in Tzaneen, she created the Isutheng Community Health Programme which empowered women through growing vegetable gardens and other economically empowering activities. The Biko Heritage Trail which runs from Port Elizabeth to King William's Town, it includes Niko's home in Ginsenberg township, Biko Bridge in East London and the Zanempilo Clinic. Currently, the "Biko Clinic" is functioning and in need of repairs. It serves 800 people per month in a community of 3500.

== See also ==
- Africana womanism
- Black Power
- Black Power Revolution
- Black Surrealism
- Négritude
- Steve Biko Foundation
