= Christine Qunta =

South African writer, lawyer and entrepreneur (born 1952)

- Born: Christine Douts Qunta; 1952 (age 73–74); Kimberley, Northern Cape, Union of South Africa
- Education: University of the Western Cape, University of New South Wales
- Occupations: Writer, lawyer and entrepreneur
- Spouse: Vuyisa Cebani Qunta
- Children: Yolisa Nehanda Qunta (born 1979) Nzinga Marhoyi Qunta (born 1983)
- Writing career
- Movement: Anti-apartheid Black Consciousness Movement
- Website: https://pholosang.co.za/ and https://seritisasechaba.co.za/

Christine Douts Qunta (born 1952) is a South African writer, lawyer and entrepreneur. She has served on several public and private boards, and her work in various fields has been described as being "held together by the quest for a more just and free society." She was an activist in the anti-apartheid Black Consciousness Movement (BCM) during the 1970s and spent 17 years in exile, studying and practising law in Australia, Botswana and Zimbabwe, before returning to South Africa in 1993.

== Biography ==
=== Early years and activism ===
Christine Qunta was born in Kimberley, South Africa, on July 6 1952. After ending her formal education in the 1970s, she devoted herself to anti-apartheid political activism. She was on the regional executive of the South African Students' Organisation and the Black People's Convention at the University of the Western Cape in the 1970s and was among the hundreds of student activists who gave up their studies during the 1973 walk-out to work more closely with the people, which "mobilised communities to such an extent that the apartheid regime was forced to employ the first black vice-chancellor, Richard van der Ross." After being detained by the government for her activism, she fled the country and was granted asylum in Botswana, remaining in exile until 1993.

=== Legal career ===
She went on to study law in Australia at the University of New South Wales, Sydney (BA, LLB, 1981), subsequently practising law in Australia, Botswana and Zimbabwe, before returning to South Africa in 1993 and working as a Legal Advisor for Sanlam. In 1994, she completed a course in Restructuring of Business Entities with the International Development Law Institute in Rome, Italy. Her area of expertise is corporate law with a special focus on company law.

In 1995, she started her own law firm specialising in corporate law, Qunta Incorporated, in the CBD of Cape Town which was the first black firm to do so. She was also the senior partner in the firm until 2008, when she left the firm to focus on other business ventures. She was deputy chair of the South African Broadcasting Corporation until her resignation in 2009.

=== Literary work ===
Qunta began publishing her writing while in exile, including the poetry collections Hoyi Na! Azania: Poems of an African Struggle (1979) and Heroes & other Treasures (1990), as well as editing the non-fiction anthology Women in Southern Africa (1987). She is also the author of Who's Afraid of Affirmative Action: A Survival Guide for Black Professionals (1995) and her most recent book is Why We Are Not a Nation: Essays on race and transition in South Africa (2016). Qunta has also been a newspaper columnist, and her work has appeared in many publications, among them the anthology Daughters of Africa (edited by Margaret Busby, 1992).

In 2013, she started the non-profit publishing company Seriti sa Sechaba (a name meaning "dignity of the nation") aiming "to publish fiction and non-fiction by Black (African, Coloured and Indian) authors that reflect the lived experience and culture of the majority of the people in South Africa", in English and indigenous languages.

== Bibliography ==
- Hoyi Na! Azania: Poems of an African Struggle (Marimba Enterprises, 1979)
- (Editor) Women in Southern Africa (Allison and Busby, 1987; 1988, ISBN 978-0850317459)
- Heroes & other Treasures (Seriti sa Sechaba Publishers, 1990, ISBN 978-0620152914)
- Who's Afraid of Affirmative Action: A Survival Guide for Black Professionals (Kwela Books, 1995, ISBN 978-0795700033)
- Why We Are Not a Nation: Essays on race and transition in South Africa (Seriti sa Sechaba Publishers, 2016, ISBN 9780994677013)
