= Aelred Stubbs =

English Anglican priest, monk and anti-Apartheid activist

Aelred Stubbs (2 August 1923 – 17 October 2004) was an Anglican priest and monk, influential in the campaign against apartheid in South Africa during the 1970s.

== Early life ==
He was born Anthony Richard Peter Stubbs on 2 August 1923 and educated at Eton College, Oxford University, and the theological College of the Resurrection in Mirfield, Yorkshire. He was ordained priest and took his vows as a member of the monastic order, the Community of the Resurrection (CR) in 1954, taking the name Aelred.

In his wartime service, he was a part of the Special Operations Executive (SOE) and worked behind enemy lines in Northern Europe on works of sabotage. He cited his wartime experience as a major impetus towards seeking ordination.

== Church career ==
After his ordination he spent the first years of his ministry in England. In 1960 he was sent to the College of the Resurrection and St Peter in Rosettenville as principal of the seminary in which the CR fathers trained almost all black priests for the northern dioceses of the Anglican Church of Southern Africa for most of the 20th century. Desmond Tutu was a student at St Peter's and was identified by Stubbs as a possible black candidate to be principal of the college. He helped Tutu to study at King's College London, to further this aim.

St Peter's College was later forced to close by the apartheid government because it was in a white group area but taught black students. Stubbs successfully argued for its relocation to Alice, Eastern Cape as part of the multi-denominational Federal Theological Seminary of Southern Africa. The new college nurtured debate among their students and others.

== Anti-Apartheid activism ==
Stubbs became known for his work in South Africa against the apartheid regime (so much so that the South African government refused to let him re-enter the country after his mother's funeral in 1977).

During his time in Alice, Stubbs met and became friends with student activist Steve Biko, the first president of South African Students' Organisation (SASO). Stubbs said later that he came to realise that Biko, Barney Pityana and others "had the key to the future in South Africa..."

In 1972 Stubbs returned to the College of the Resurrection priory in Rosettenville. As the government tried to crush Black Consciousness Movement, he began a new ministry which would occupy the next 5 years — visiting the 'banned and the banished'. According to Barney Pityana he "went out of his way", travelling across the country to visit past and present activists such as Biko, Mamphela Ramphele and Robert Sobukwe. He kept a public vigil in the Johannesburg courtroom throughout the 1975 trial of nine Black Consciousness Movement leaders.

According to the Church Times, "Stubbs was one of the most remarkable Mirfield Fathers of his generation. At a crucial period in South Africa’s history, he deeply influenced a whole group of black ordinands, including Desmond Tutu. He exercised an often dangerous ministry to opponents of apartheid, including his close friend Steve Biko. Undergirding everything was contemplative prayer."

== Later life ==
In the late 1970s Stubbs withdrew to a hut in the grounds of a convent in Lesotho. In 1981 he was called back to England to take charge of his community's house in Sunderland. The community closed the house in 1993. Stubbs died on 17 October 2004.

== Publications ==
- Stubbs collected and edited Steve Biko's writings and published them as I Write what I Like
- The Planting of the Federal Theological Seminary of Southern Africa. Lovedale Press. 1973.
