= Steve Biko Foundation =

Community development organisation in South Africa

Established in 1998, The Steve Biko Foundation (SBF) is a community development organisation in South Africa. The organisation is inspired by the late anti-apartheid activist Steve Biko (1946–1977).

== Approach ==
The approach of the Steve Biko Foundation is to

- Create an inclusive platform to promote the legacy of Steve Biko
- Develop a culture of Interrogative leadership
- Empower individuals and communities to greater self-reliance through education, training and capacity building
- Explore issues of identity, focusing on the integration of the personal, political and professional dimensions
- Encourage alternative perspectives through the continual examination of dominant paradigms
- Cultivate partnerships to heighten the impact of interventions

== Programmes ==
The Steve Biko Foundation runs the following programmes:

- Legacy Projects
- National Dialogue Series
- Leadership and Development
- Research and Publications

== Projects ==
=== The Steve Biko Centre ===
The Steve Biko Foundation is currently developing the Steve Biko Centre. Planned for the Ginsberg township of King William’s Town in the Eastern Cape, the centre will focus on translating global interest in the legacy of anti-apartheid activist Bantu Stephen Biko into an intellectual and economic resource for the local and regional economy.

The Steve Biko Centre is meant to be a living monument that utilises memory to channel local energies towards contemporary development challenges. As such, the principal objectives of the centre are to:

- Educate the public about the leadership of Biko and his contribution to freedom and democracy;
- Assist in strengthening the capacity of community-based organisations to provide essential services;
- Contribute to poverty eradication through the development of cultural industries;
- Support community development and mass participation in national dialogue;
- Promote sustainable livelihoods through SMME development.

=== The Biko Heritage Trail ===
Located in the Eastern Cape, The Biko Heritage Trail comprises six Biko related sites which have been declared national monuments. Among them are:

- The Biko Home, Ginsberg, King William's Town
- The Steve Biko Garden of Remembrance, King William's Town
- The Biko Bridge, East London
- The Biko Statue, East London
- No. 15 Leopold Street, Former BCP Office, King William's Town
- Zanempilo Clinic, Zinyoka

Currently the trail attracts visitors from South Africa as well as the international community. Once established, The Steve Biko Centre will serve as the cornerstone of the trail.

=== National Dialogue Series ===
Integral to the work of the Foundation are public lectures, seminars and publications. This series of activities contributes substantively to the goals of SBF by:

- Promoting leadership
- Stimulating critical debate
- Creating platforms for intergenerational dialogue
- Bridging the gap between academia and civil society
- Linking local issues with the Diaspora and the international community at large
- Generating content for publications and informing research

=== The Steve Biko Memorial Lecture ===
Established in 2000, the Steve Biko Memorial Lecture is an annual event that attracts over 2,000 patrons and is broadcast to 47 African nations. To date, the memorial lecture has been delivered by:

- Professor Njabulo Ndebele: "Iph' Indlela: Charting the Way Forward", 2000;
- Professor Zakes Mda: "Biko’s Children", 2001;
- Professor Chinua Achebe: "Orchestrating the Memory of Biko 25 Years On", 2002;
- Professor Ngugi wa Thiong’o: "Recovering our Memory: South Africa in the Black Imagination", 2003;
- President Nelson Mandela: "Ten Years of Democracy 1994–2004", 2004;
- Dr Mamphela Ramphele: "Citizenship as Stewardship", 2005;
- Archbishop Emeritus Desmond Tutu: "South Africa: a Scintillating Success Waiting to Happen", 2006;
- President Thabo Mbeki: "The Quest for True Humanity", 2007;
- Minister Trevor Manuel: "Energising Democracy: Rights and Responsibilities", 2008;
- Governor Tito Mboweni: "Reflections on Some Economic and Social Developments in South Africa in the Past 15 Years".

=== The Robert Sobukwe Memorial Lecture ===
Established to honour the legacy of the late Pan-Africanist, the Robert Sobukwe Memorial Lecture focuses on issues that are particularly relevant to the African continent. Lectures have been delivered by:

- Professor Es'kia Mphahlele: "Robert Sobukwe: The Bright Morning Star", 2003
- Archbishop Emeritus Njongonkulu Ndungane: "Reflections on the First Decade of Democracy", 2004
- Judge Dumisa Ntsebeza: "Reflections on African Unity: Focus on Darfur", 2005
- President Pierre Buyoya: "Arusha Agreement for Peace and Reconciliation in Burundi: Ten Years on the Path Toward Peace", 2008

=== The Matthew Goniwe Youth Leadership Conference ===
An annual gathering that brings together the leadership of over 70 community-based organisations, the Matthew Goniwe Youth Leadership Conference provides an opportunity for organisations to meet and interact with policy makers, grant makers, corporate sponsors and government departments, while providing necessary training and capacity building.

Among the individuals and organisations who have participated are:

- Ms Nosimo Balindlela, Eastern Cape Premier;
- Mr Danny Jordaan, 2010 LOC CEO;
- Advocate Sonwabile Mancotywa, National Heritage Council CEO;
- Dr Zola Skweyiya, Minister of Social Development and Welfare;
- Clinton Democracy Fellowship;
- Ford Foundation;
- Kellogg Foundation;
- Mott Foundation.

=== Seminars ===
In addition to its annual lectures and conferences, the Foundation facilitates a number of other platforms for dialogue and leadership development in the form of seminars and workshops, which are anchored by a range of practitioners.

These include:

- "The Global Impact of 9/11": panel discussion including Ms Farayi Chideya, Advocate Millard Arnold, Professor Barney Pityana (2001);
- "Challenges Facing South Africa’s Young Artists": panel discussion including Professor Chinua Achebe, Professor Willie Kgositsile, Don Mattera and Kgafela wa Magogodi (2002);
- "Women and Development": panel discussion including Mrs Graça Machel, Ms Charlayne Hunter-Gault and Professor Christie Achebe (2002);
- "Writing in Indigenous Languages": workshop featuring Professor Ngũgĩ wa Thiong'o, Dr Neville Alexander, Professor Mbulelo Mzamane and Professor Véronique Tadjo (2003);
- "Afrocentricity": lecture by Professor Molefi Asante (2003);
- "The Leadership of Oliver Tambo": panel discussion including Minister Pallo Jordan, Ms Gertrude Shope and Mr Joe Mathews, facilitated by Mr Tim Modise (2004);
- "Celebrating the Ultimate Sacrifice: A Focus on Torture and Death in Detention Under Apartheid": panel discussion featuring Dr Mamphela Ramphele, Professor Barney Pityana and Advocate George Bizos, facilitated by Ms Christine Qunta (2005);
- "Consciousness, Agency and the African Development Agenda": a conference featuring President Joaquim Chissano, President Kenneth Kaunda, President Jerry Rawlings, Bishop Malusi Mpumlwana and Bishop Mvume Dandala (2007).

=== Frank Talk ===
Titled after the pseudonym under which Steve Biko wrote, this newly created forum is designed to bring together young professionals from various sectors for discussion around salient issues impacting South Africa’s political, economic and social development. Among the topics to be explored are:

- Combating Xenophobia
- Land Transformation: Rural & Urban Implications
- Health Care: Finding a Solution for South Africa

=== Leadership development ===
Given the dual challenges of leadership and consolidation of democracy, the Steve Biko Foundation works extensively on leadership development.

The Foundation’s emphasis is on developing multiple layers of leadership with an approach that integrates the personal, political and professional. In this model, an individual’s sense of self—their values and beliefs—finds expression in both their political representations and professional conduct. The proposition of the Steve Biko Foundation focuses on developing a cadre of leadership whose mandate extends beyond the boundary of the company, seeking to develop leadership not only for success, but for significance. Accordingly, the Foundation’s interventions centre on:

- Consciousness
- Community
- Capacity Building

==== Consciousness ====
In post-apartheid South Africa much has been made of the skills shortage and leadership development. Consequently, alongside the provision of access to traditional training grounds such as business schools, a number of programs have been developed to address these needs. While these initiatives do address the skills challenges facing the nation, the reality is that they are geared toward producing professionals, not citizens. The proposition of the Steve Biko Foundation focuses on developing a cadre of leadership whose mandate extends beyond the boundary of the firm.

The Foundation focuses on developing leadership not only for success, but for significance. This approach is underpinned by five central values:

- Agency
- Community
- Critical analysis and inquiry
- Culture, identity and history
- Self-reliance

Among others, the following programmatic activities are utilized to promote the link between identity, agency and social action:

- Topical workshops
- Artistic exhibitions
- Thought-provoking performances
- Cross-cultural exchange

==== Community ====
All too often, individuals and institutions outside of mainstream political formations, and recognized opinion makers, are excluded from social discourse. In seeking to create a culture of interrogative leadership, the third pillar of the Steve Biko Foundation’s leadership development program centres on increasing the capacity of communities to produce organic leaders through a self-replenishing leadership culture, sustained by consistent engagement with contemporary social issues.

The Foundation seeks to empower communities to not only serve as respondents to national dialogue, but to feature in framing the issues and developing alternative paradigms. This kind of leadership is endowed not only with the capacity to regurgitate policies and programmes; it is possessed with the aptitude to synthesize ideas and to originate policies and interventions, furthering the democratic project. A strong culture of critical engagement assists communities in developing successive generations of leadership that is responsive to and grounded in local issues.

As such, SBF works to Support Community development and mass participation in national dialogue through:

- Creating forums for public education about various policies;
- Documenting the stories of historic and contemporary individuals and institutions that make up the social capital of communities;
- Developing platforms for interaction between established professionals and emerging practitioners;
- Supporting the development of community-based organisation.

==== Capacity building ====
While the bedrock of the Foundation’s intervention is developing conscious leadership, SBF seeks to complement this element by creating access to skills development opportunities. The objective of this facet of the leadership development program is two-fold.

First, the aim is to equip individuals and communities with tools with which to express their values. By creating avenues to access vocational training, business skills and entrepreneurial opportunities, SBF seeks to assist communities in actualizing the principle of agency. The Foundation recognizes that without basic skills in community organizing and organizational development, the empowerment of marginalized individuals and communities remains an unattainable ideal.

The second impetus behind skills development as a component of leadership development is the reality that poverty and economic hardships shape the lives of the majority of South Africans. Many individuals, who could contribute positively to development and democracy, are bound by the need to provide not only for themselves but their families. At its worst, poverty not only undermines the dignity of people, but can contribute to decision-making that violates the values articulated above.

Accordingly, among the Foundation’s training interventions in the arena of capacity building focuses on:

- Cooperative development
- Enterprise development
- Organizational development

== Research and publications ==
As SBF embarks upon its second decade of developmental work, the Foundation seeks to further its vision through the creation of a Research and Policy Unit. The mandate of the unit is to facilitate research that advances the tangible elements of development: poverty eradication, education, housing; as well as the intangible elements: history, culture and values.

Steve Biko Foundation's proposition is unique in that its research undertakings are informed by 10 years of developmental programs and policy interactions at the national level and in grassroots communities. During this time, it has become increasingly evident that there is a lack of interaction between research, ensuing policies and the communities that will purportedly benefit from new findings. Moreover, communities not only serve as custodians of traditional knowledge, but constantly generate knowledge and ideas based on contemporary experiences. SBF's Research & Policy Unit aims, where appropriate to assist communities in disseminating information to a wider audience, allowing for the development of best practices and increased productivity. Accordingly, in an effort to bring alternative voices and perspectives to the fore, this unit will engage in:

- Research and policy formulation
- Fellowships
- Publications

=== Research and policy formulation ===
At the crux of the new unit lies research and policy formulation. As previously indicated all research and policy initiatives will contribute to the developmental agenda. Some projects, however, will be evaluative in nature, interrogating the success of policies as well as their unintended consequences. Problem-solving research will also be undertaken, the sole objective being to create programs and policies to address pressing developmental issues such as access to education, patients' rights and creating economic opportunities.

=== Fellowships ===
In addition to the research and policy development efforts undertaken by SBF staff, a number of studies will be conducted by fellows, of which there will be several categories.

Executive Fellows

Candidates for the executive fellowship will have served as heads of state and government or led multinational institutions. A key objective of the executive fellowship is to provide support to individuals who may not have had an opportunity to document their histories and learning during their careers, but whose lessons will be invaluable for the next generation of leadership.

Senior Fellows

Senior fellows will be lecturers in traditional academic institutions, on sabbatical, as well as senior management within the private and public sectors or non-governmental organizations whose work focuses on developmental issues.

Community Fellows

Candidates for the community fellowship will be developmental practitioners drawn from grassroots community benefit organizations. While they may not possess traditional academic training, their inputs are nonetheless invaluable to the creation of new developmental policies and programs. A unique feature of this fellowship will be the training and support given to candidates during their tenure at SBF.

Junior Fellows

Junior fellowships will also cater for individuals who are still pursuing their undergraduate and postgraduate studies. Candidates will be drawn from South Africa as well as the international community.

Alumni

An important outcome of the SBF fellowship program will be an international network of academicians and developmental practitioners, who not only represent a variety of industries and sectors, but who span generational and cultural divides. As alumni of the fellowship program, these individuals can continuously contribute to developmental discourse via SBF's publications, dialogues and innovative programs; and will have opportunities to personally craft Alumni residences at the Steve Biko Foundation as the need arises.

=== Publications ===
Beyond providing the tools for knowledge production and aggregation, the Steve Biko Foundation’s research and policy unit will create a platform for the dissemination of this information. Key components of the SBF's publishing program will be:

- Monthly perspectives
- Occasional policy papers
- An annual journal
- Books

Monthly perspectives

On a monthly basis, the Steve Biko Foundation will produce a publication entitled Viewpoint. Named after a publication of the Black Community Programs, Viewpoint will contain perspectives on topical issues on the development agenda. Content will be provided by experts in various fields as well as SBF fellows and alumni. Designed as a dialogue tool for the general public, Viewpoint will be distributed electronically and physically.

Policy papers

The Steve Biko Foundation will also produce policy papers on an occasional basis as warranted. The papers will interrogate both the intended and unintended consequences of policy, while crafting innovative policy propositions. As envisaged, SBF's occasional policy papers will serve not only to advance policy options proposed by members of the SBF network, it will also serve as a premier, non-partisan platform for dialogue and debate about both national and international policy.

Frank Talk Journal

As conceptualized, the Frank Talk Journal will be published on an annual basis. Titled after the penname under which Steve Biko wrote, Frank Talk will contain articles based on the research of various fellows. While intended to be a scholarly publication, Frank Talk will also create opportunities for "lay" people, or those not recognized by the academic establishment, to contribute thoughtful pieces on topics of their choice.

Books

An additional offering of the Steve Biko Foundation’s Research and Policy unit will be the publication of books. Manuscripts will be produced by Fellows of the Foundation as well as members of SBF's extended network.
