= Frank Talk =

- Editor: Stephen Bantu Biko, Louis Farrakhan
- Categories: Political magazine
- Frequency: Irregular
- Founded: 1984
- Final issue: 1990
- Country: South Africa
- Language: English
- Website: www.chimurengalibrary.co.za/periodicals.php?id=2

Frank Talk was a political magazine established in 1984 in South Africa, and arising out of the student-led anti-apartheid movement of the 1970s and 80s.

== History ==
Frank Talk was originally the pseudonym under which Steve Biko wrote several articles as the Publications Director of the South African Students' Organisation (SASO), Frank Talk became the title of the magazine published by the Azanian People's Organisation (AZAPO), a nationalist group committed to Biko's ideas of Black Consciousness.

Biko's prolific SASO writings were published in early volumes of Frank Talk, and throughout its history the magazine remained committed to the Black Consciousness ideology responsible for mobilizing student-led anti-apartheid resistance. Exploring the theory of Black Consciousness and related issues of race and racism, theology, culture, and revolution, Frank Talk became a platform for rigorous political analysis of the frustrations and problems of black students and black people generally. Available in both Afrikaans and English, several issues of the journal were banned for distribution by South Africa's apartheid government. The last issue of Frank Talk was published in 1990.
