= Strini Moodley =

Strinivasa Rajoo "Strini" Moodley (29 October 1946 – 27 April 2006) was a founding member of the Black Consciousness Movement in South Africa with Steve Biko and Aubrey Mokoape, among others. In 1976, he was convicted of terrorism in a trial involving members of the South African Students' Organisation and the Black People's Convention, and imprisoned on Robben Island.

He became deputy news editor at the Natal Witness. Upon release from Robben island in 1982, Strini delivered a paper on The State of the Oppressed at the Black Consciousness Movement organized Forum in Hammanskraal. He was then Publicity Secretary of the Azanian People's Organisation.
