= Bennie Khoapa =

Bennie Khoapa was a social worker in South Africa during the 1960s and 1970s involved in the resistance to apartheid. He worked for YMCA, and was supportive of the young activists of the time, especially the young Steve Biko. Ultimately Biko and Khoapa founded the Black Consciousness Movement (BCM). In the movement, Khoapa was able to use his experience and connections to garner the support of various Christian organizations, and lend the BCM crucial credibility in its formative months. Khoapa was among those banned by the South African government due to their actions in the anti-apartheid movement.

In 1971, the Black Community Programme was launched under Khoapa's direction. The programme published journals and newspapers for the Black community of South Africa. One such journal was Black Review, launched in 1972 with Khoapa as the editor.

== See also ==
- Bennie Khoapa's entry at SA History Online
- List of people subject to banning orders under apartheid
