= Mapetla Mohapi =

- Born: 2 September 1947; Sterkspruit
- Died: 5 August 1976 (aged 28)
- Political party: Black Consciousness Movement
- Spouse: Nohle Mohapi
- Children: Motheba and Konehali

Mapetla Mohapi was a member of the Black Consciousness Movement, who died in detention during Apartheid in 1976.

== Early life and education ==
Mohapi was born in the rural village of Jozanashoek in Sterkspruit (former Transkei) on 2 September 1947. He obtained a degree in Social Work from the University of the North – Turfloop. Mohapi met Nobuhle (Nohle) Haya in 1971 and they got married in 1973, with their first child Motheba being born in 1974 and the second, Konehali, in 1975.

== Politics ==
Mohapi joined the South African Students' Organisation and the Black Consciousness Movement (BCM) while he was studying at Turfloop. His first detainment came in October 1974 after SASO leaders celebrated the independence of Mozambique. He was released in April 1975 after spending 164 days without having been charged. During the Human Rights Violations Hearings of the Truth and Reconciliation Commission of South Africa held in East London on 15 April 1996, his wife stated that it took the family months to find out where he was detained and she was there for a week before they allowed her to see him for two minutes. Mohapi was also elected permanent secretary of SASO and also worked as director of Zimele Trust which was an organisation that took care of ex-political prisoners and their families. In September 1975, he was banned under the Suppression of Communism Act and confined to the areas of King William's Town and Zwelitsha.

== Death in detention ==
On 16 July 1976, Mohapi was detained under Section 6 of the Terrorism Act, making him the first to be detained under that section. He was suspected of involvement in transporting youngsters across the border to Botswana for military training. On 5 August 1976, Mohapi was found with a pair of jeans tied around his neck which hung from the bars in his cell. Police produced a suicide note addressed to Captain Schoeman, claiming Mohapi had committed suicide in his cell. The letter read:

Death Cell Kei Road, 5/8/76
This is just to say goodbye to you. You can carry on interrogating my dead body. Perhaps you will get what you want from it. Give my regards to my people at home, Aunt Sheila & her family & to my friends my love to you always. Mapetla

Two days before his death, he managed to smuggle a note on a strip of toilet paper to his wife Nonhle, assuring her of his ability to cope. An inquest held later found that the note was forged but no one could be held responsible for the death of Mohapi. His wife sued the police Minister with claims that the authorities staged his death. A hired handwriting expert determined that Mohapi's signature was forged but no charges were filed. Steve Biko's letter to the principal magistrate regarding the death of Mohapi was written on 12 January 1977. It reads:

I have been asked by the attorney representing the Mohapi family in the above matter to make myself available for consultations on the 16th January with their counsel as well as attend the inquest which has been set down for the 17th and 18th January. Kindly grant me the necessary permission to enter the premises of the King Williams Town Magistrate’s Court on the relevant dates and to attend the consultation which will be held somewhere in King Williams Town. I do not as yet know where exactly Mr Mxenge plans to have the consultation. Yours faithfully

Biko was at the time banned from leaving King Williams Town due to his involvement with the BCM.

Nonhle Mohapi was also detained following her husband's death and subjected to both physical and psychological torture. She stayed in solitary confinement for 6 months and upon her release, was banned. During her testimony before the TRC, she also mentioned how the police would attempt to make her sign blank pages, which she always refused. She learned during that time that Biko was also detained. The police would also torture her by claiming that her youngest daughter had died and they would release her only if she cooperated with them.

== Honours ==
A memorial was erected in Sterkspruit where Mohapi was born, in his honour. He also received the Order of Luthuli from the South African Presidency, for "dedicating his life to the struggle for a democratic, free and non-racial South Africa".
