= South African Students' Movement =

Anti-apartheid political organisation (1972–1977)

The South African Students' Movement (SASM) was an anti-apartheid political organisation of South African school students, best known for its role in the 1976 Soweto uprising. By 1976 it was strongly identified with the Black Consciousness Movement. It was banned by the apartheid government in October 1977 as part of the repressive state response to the uprising.

SASM was founded in 1972 in the Transvaal and was most active in Soweto high schools. According to academic Nozipho Diseko, its precursor was the African Students Movement (ASM), a forum founded in Soweto in 1968. On Diseko's account, ASM's leaders, in consultation with leaders of the Black Consciousness South African Students' Organisation (SASO), decided in 1972 to rename and expand ASM and subsequently launched several broad campaigns against the Bantu Education system.
