= Black People's Convention =

Coordinating body of the Black Consciousness Movement

The Black People's Convention (BPC) was a national coordinating body for the Black Consciousness movement of South Africa. Envisaged as a broad-based counterpart to the South African Students' Organisation, the BPC was active in organising resistance to apartheid from its establishment in 1972 until it was banned in late 1977.

== Formation ==
The BPC was an outgrowth of the Black Consciousness movement in South Africa, which gained traction in the early 1970s and increasingly became a major alternative source of ideological and organisational support for resistance to the system of apartheid. With the influence of the South African Students' Organisation (SASO) growing, Black Consciousness leaders called for the formation of a new Black Consciousness political organisation to engage and mobilise broader civil society, outside the universities. The shape of this national umbrella body, which became the BPC, was discussed at a series of conferences in 1971. The BPC was launched in July 1972 in Pietermaritzburg. At its first national congress in December 1972, held in Hammanskraal, Winnie Kgware was elected its first president.

== Activities and principles ==
The BPC subscribed to a Black Consciousness philosophy, as articulated by Steve Biko. Biko was closely associated with the BPC, although his political activity was seriously circumscribed following his banning in 1973. His brother-in-law, Mxolisi Mvovo, became national vice president of the BPC in 1976. The BPC collaborated with other Black Consciousness organisations, such as SASO, with whom its membership overlapped significantly. Membership was not open to whites.

According to its constitution, the BPC's principal aim was to foster black political unity and solidarity, towards both psychological and material liberation for blacks in South Africa. The BPC opposed apartheid through non-violent means and through non-participation in the apartheid system. It also advocated for an equitable economic system based on socialism and what it called "black communalism". As described in the BPC's "Mafikeng Manifesto", co-written by Biko and debated at a symposium in Mafikeng in 1976, black communalism was a variant of the traditional African economic system, modified for a modern and industrialised economy. It entailed communal ownership, and state custodianship, of all land.

== Government crackdown ==
On 25 September 1974, the day of an illegal pro-FRELIMO rally in Durban organised by the BPC and SASO, leaders in the BPC and other Black Consciousness organisations were arrested across the country. In the aftermath, nine BPC and SASO leaders were tried under the Terrorism Act. A second, more serious wave of government repression followed the 1976 Soweto Uprising. On 19 October 1977, sometimes known as "Black Wednesday", 18 organisations, including the BPC and SASO, were banned by the apartheid government. As many as 70 Black Consciousness leaders were arrested on the same day. Among them were Kenny Rachidi and Drake Tshenkeng, the BPC's president and vice president respectively. Biko himself had died in custody a month earlier.

== Aftermath ==
In the years after Black Wednesday, many BPC and Black Consciousness activists became active in the Azanian People's Organisation (Azapo) and its subsidiary organisations. Azapo was founded in April 1978 in Roodepoort as an offshoot of the Soweto Action Council, which had been formed in Chiawelo, Soweto, shortly after the 1977 crackdown. Like the BPC, Azapo was closed to whites and strongly opposed participation in the apartheid system – it even inherited the BPC's slogan, "One Azania, one people" – but it was more rigidly Marxist than the BPC. BPC and Black Consciousness activists in exile joined the Black Consciousness Movement of Azania (BCMA), established in London as Azapo's external wing before BCMA and Azapo formally merged in 1994.

In the 1980s and early 1990s, however, the popularity of Congress-aligned organisations increased and Black Consciousness organisations (though not necessarily Black Consciousness ideologies) declined in influence. When Azapo was itself banned in 1988, many more Black Consciousness-aligned youths left South Africa and joined the Pan Africanist Congress and African National Congress, in order to receive military training in exile.

== Notable members ==
- Steve Biko
- Winnie Kgware
- Mosibudi Mangena
- Sathasivan Cooper
- Tshenuwani Farisani
- Nkwenkwe Nkomo
- Priscilla Jana
- Mthuli ka Shezi
- Mosibudi Mangena
- Aubrey Mokoape
- Malusi Mpumlwana
- Cyril Ramaphosa
- Mamphela Ramphele

== Related organisations ==
- Azanian People's Organisation
- Black Allied Workers' Union
- South African Students' Organisation
- Black Community Programmes (the community projects arms of the BPC-SASO bloc)
- South African Students Movement
