= Sathasivian Cooper =

Social psychologist and anti-apartheid youth leader

Sathasivan Cooper
- Born: 11 June 1950 (age 75); Durban, South Africa
- Education: University of South Africa; University of the Witwatersrand; Boston University
- Known for: Part of the SASO Nine

Sathasivan "Saths" Cooper (born 11 June 1950) is a clinical psychologist in South Africa who was born in Durban of Indian-South African background. He began to identify with the Black Consciousness Movement (BCM) and joined the South African Students' Organisation (SASO), and was one of the so-called "SASO Nine" student leaders arrested in 1974 for their anti-Apartheid activities. During this time Saths spent nine years banned, house arrested and jailed, including over five years in Robben Island where he shared a cell block with Nelson Mandela.

While imprisoned, Cooper completed his undergraduate degree in psychology via a correspondence course with the University of South Africa. Released in 1982 Cooper went on to study at the University of the Witwatersrand completing his PhD as a Fulbright scholar at Boston University. He was four times elected President of the Psychological Society of South Africa, and was Vice-Chancellor and Principal of the University of Durban-Westville (prior to its merger). He served as President of the International Congress of Psychology which was held in 2012 in Cape Town, South Africa. At the Congress, Cooper was elected the first African President of the International Union of Psychological Science (IUPsyS), a kind of United Nations for 90 national psychology organizations and over 20 regional organizations.

== Background ==
Cooper was born in a rural area outside Durban, South Africa where his parents ran a local school. He grew up understanding and using multiple languages including Zulu, Tamil, Afrikaans, Xhosa, and English. Cooper became politically active in high school and continued to be politically active throughout college, which may have resulted in his expulsion from the University College, Salisbury Island, Durban as well as the South African government denying him a passport to attend university in Britain. As a leader of the Natal Indian Congress, Cooper had frequent meetings with Steve Biko, the leader of the Black Consciousness Movement, and encouraged Indian activists to participate in this movement.

== Contributions to Psychology ==
Cooper's most significant contributions to psychology was to help South Africans heal from the trauma of apartheid, advance human rights, and support democracy. He also helped to create the Psychological Society of South Africa (PsySSA), which was South Africa's first psychology organization that did not discriminate based on race or gender.

=== Roles ===
- Founding Secretary - Theatre Council of Natal (TECON)
- Founding Secretary - South African Black Theatre Union
- Co-Leader - 1972 national student boycott of the University of the North (with Steve Biko)
- Vice president, deputy, and president - Azanian People's Organization
- Founder - National Forum
- Founding trustee - Institute for Black Research
- President - South African/Azanian Student Movement, US
- Chair - Archbishop Tutu Scholarship Fund
- Co-Founder - Center for Health and Development, US
- Chair - Soweto Dance Theatre Company
- Chair - Operation Masakhane for the Homeless
- Participant - Alternate Dispute Resolution Association of South Africa
- Chair - South African Community Developmental Agency
- Chair - Conquest for Life
- Founding member - Goldstone Commission of Enquiry into Children's Rights
- Contributor - Robben Island Museum
- Contributor - Apartheid Museum
- Contributor - Nelson Mandela Gateway
- Founding publisher - Indigo (lifestyle magazine)
- Consult - Various radio and television programs
- Chair - Road Accident Fund
- Representative - IUPsyS

== Honors ==
- Fellow of the International Science Council
- Fellow of the British Psychological Society (2014).
- American Psychological Association Award for Distinguished Contributions to the International Advancement of Psychology (2014).
- Achievement Against The Odds Award from International Union of Psychological Science (2012).
- Medal for Services to International Psychology from International Union of Psychological Science (2008).
- Fellow of the National Academy of Psychology (India) (2007).
- Fellow of the Psychological Society of South Africa (2002).
- Fellow of the Irish Psychological Society.
