= Aubrey Mokoape =

South African activist (1944–2020)

- Born: Maitshwe Nchaupe Aubrey Mokoape; 6 September 1944; Johannesburg, South Africa
- Died: 26 December 2020 (aged 76); Durban, South Africa
- Occupations: Doctor, anti-apartheid activist, former leader of the black consciousness movement and South African student organisation
- Years active: circa.1958 - 2020
- Partner: Gwen

Dr. Maitshwe Nchuape Aubrey Mokoape (6 September 1944 – 26 December 2020) was a South African anti-apartheid activist and a leader of the Pan-Africanist Congress and Black Consciousness Movement. He was first arrested and detained at the age of 15. He studied and worked alongside political anti-apartheid activist Steve Biko. In post-apartheid South Africa, Mokoape became a physician.

== Early life and education ==
Aubrey Mokoape was born in Johannesburg, South Africa, where he grew up as a child but later moved to Pretoria with his family. Aubrey and his family lived in a Johannesburg location in a building that only workers lived in. He had three siblings, Walter, George, Keith and Barbara. His father worked for an old trading company known as the Elephant Trading Company. He worked as a dispatch clerk but before this he worked as a teacher. Mokoape's father was transferred to Pretoria and so was the rest of his family and this is where Mokoape partly grew up. He studied through Bantu education at an elite Johannesburg high school, in one of the locations, known as Orlando High School. His years in Orlando high school were prominent due to the high level of political activity. He later studied to be a doctor at the University of Natal.

== Political career ==
In 1948 Bantu education was introduced and in 1955 he and a few others, were the first to study under Bantu education. However, during this time past laws were reinforced and were a lot stricter than before. There was a lot of political agitation at this time. In 1957 most of the workers in the location were asked to move out of the building and were allocated to Soweto and Mokoape and his family were asked to move out of the building and relocate to Soweto. Mokoape's 'political baptism' (as he calls it) happened for him during the Pebco bus strike and this was the first political activity he took part in. This was one of the first and popular strikes to occur since buses were boycotted and students were forced to walk 7–8 kilometres to school.

His high school was a highly politicised high school where he also met senior leaders of the Pan Africanist Congress (PAC). They held meetings and discussions about political issues during school hours as they were a Pan Africanist school. Mokoape was the vocal student among his peers and was one of the leaders in the school. In 1958 and 1959 at the ages of 14 and 15 Mokoape had become a well known political voice in the school. He also had the privilege of being around figures such as Robert Sobukwe. Mokoape was influenced by his neighbours, his peers and his father in becoming an Africanist and was around during the formation of the PAC.

In 1959 members of the anti-Apartheid parties were surrendering themselves for arrest, however, during this time Mokoape was working at a golf course as a caddy trying to earn a living while also attending school with important PAC members. On 21 March 1963 Mokoape and a few comrades marched with Sobukwe to surrender themselves for arrest to the police but the police did not take them seriously. While Mokoape and other activists were still at the police station, members of the police force heard that shots were being fired at the march and led to what is now known as the Sharpeville Massacre. The Sharpeville massacre generated mass calamity and Mokoape and other political members were later detained. Mokoape and 150 others were sentenced to 3 years in prison and were sent to the notorious Number four prison (since turned into the South African Constitutional Court) in Pretoria. Sobukwe and the other leaders were sentenced to 2 years in prison as their trial was different. After being detained at the Number four prison for a few months, they were later transferred to Benoni prison and lastly to a prison in the Free State. They were subjected to solitary confinement and also cruelty by being forced to work in the mines.

After being sentenced to three years due to his involvement in the Sharpeville Massacre Mokoape was released from prison and pursued a career in becoming a doctor and studied at the University of Natal where he met Steve Bantu Biko. Both Biko and Mokoape were prominent leaders of the Black consciousness Movement and key members of the South African Students' Organisation (SASO) and Black People's Convention (BPC). The BCM emerged during the banning of the ANC and PAC after the Sharpeville massacre. On top of building schools and day care centres and taking part in other social projects, the BCM through the BCP was involved in the staging of the large scale protests and workers strikes which gripped the nation in 1972 and 1973, especially in Durban. Indeed, in 1973 the government of South Africa began to clamp down on the movement, claiming that their ideas of black development were treasonous, and virtually the entire leadership of SASO and BPC were banned Black Consciousness Movement. Mokoape was one of the members restricted to Durban. He was known as the founder member of the BPC and a medical doctor at the King Edward VII Hospital in Durban. At the time of his banning; he was charged under the Terrorism Act, in the Pretoria Supreme Court at the so-called Palace of Justice he was detained in September 1974 and sentenced in December 1976 to 6 years imprisonment, in a trial of nine SASO and BPC members.

== Personal life ==
Dr. Mokoape lived with his wife Gwen in Durban Kwa-Zulu Natal South Africa.

== Death ==
Mokoape died on 26 December 2020. He had been ill with high blood-sugar, and tested positive for COVID-19 on Christmas Day during the COVID-19 pandemic in South Africa. He experienced low oxygen levels on 26 December, and died on the way to hospital.

== See also ==
- Black Consciousness Movement

== Sources ==
- ^"Dr. Maitshwe Mokoape". South African History online. Retrieved 2013-05-11.
- ^"sharpveville massacre its historic significance struggle against apartheid". South African History.org. Retrieved 2013-05-12.
- Aubrey Mokoape's Address at the Steve Biko Memorial event in Grahamstown on 19 September 2012 . Google.com. Retrieved 2013-05-12.
- Black consciousness movement. Wikipedia. Retrieved 2013-05-11.
- ^"Politics and Medicine close to heart". Sowetan live. Retrieved 2013-05-11.
- ^"sa statement by the unemployed peoples movement on honouring the memory of steve biko". Polity.org. Retrieved 2013-05-12.
- ^"South Africa:overcoming Apartheid". Nchaupe Aubrey Mokoape interviewed by David Wiley 10 November 2006 Durban, South Africa. Retrieved 2013-05-11
