= SASO/BPC trial =

1975–1976 political trial in South Africa

The SASO/BPC trial, also known as the Black Consciousness trial, was an apartheid-era legal trial in South Africa which resulted in the conviction of nine Black Consciousness activists from the South African Students' Organisation (SASO) and Black People's Convention (BPC). The trial ran from 31 January 1975 to 21 December 1976 in the Pretoria Supreme Court.

The nine accused are commonly known as the SASO Nine. They were Zithulele Cindi, Saths Cooper, Mosioua Lekota, Aubrey Mokoape, Strini Moodley, Muntu Myeza, Pandelani Nefolovhodwe, Nkwenke Nkomo and Gilbert Kaborone Sedibe. They were first arrested, with four other Black Consciousness activists, by the Security Branch in September 1974; they were charged with treason for organising pro-FRELIMO rallies in Natal to celebrate Mozambican independence, in defiance of a police ban against the gatherings.

In one of the longest political trials of the apartheid era, witnesses for the defence included Steve Biko and Rick Turner. The trial received extensive public attention and press coverage. When the trial ended, all nine defendants were convicted under the Terrorism Act and sentenced to periods of imprisonment on Robben Island: three were given six-year sentences and the six others were given five-year sentences. The detention of the SASO Nine depleted the leadership ranks of the Black Consciousness movement.
