= Willie Madisha =

21st-century South African trade unionist and politician

William Mothipa Madisha is a South African trade unionist and politician. Madisha is the former President of both the Congress of South African Trade Unions (from 1999 to 2008) and the South African Democratic Teachers Union (from 1996 to 2008). Madisha grew up in Atteridgeville, Pretoria, South Africa, where he was a member of the United Democratic Front. He studied teaching at Transvaal College of Education.

Madisha was fired from his position as COSATU president and expelled from the organisation on 27 February 2008; he was also fired from SADTU on 29 July 2008. He had been under suspension since the second half of 2007 while a probe into the disappearance of a large cash donation was being carried out by COSATU; he had received the suspension for making public allegations concerning the estimated R500,000 donation from businessman Charles Modise to the South African Communist Party. He also was expelled from the SACP's central committee.

A noted dissenter from the predominant opinion of COSATU, he had publicly backed Thabo Mbeki for the presidency at the African National Congress's 2007 national conference in Polokwane while the trade union federation had adopted a resolution backing Jacob Zuma. He then backed the Congress of the People (COPE) breakaway party formed by Mosiuoa Lekota, the former defence minister in Mbeki's second government.

Madisha was elected to the National Assembly in the 2009 Elections as a COPE MP.

In August 2022, Madisha, by then deputy president of the party, announced that leader Mosiuoa Lekota had been suspended. Lekota subsequently stated that his suspension was illegitimate, as Madisha, along with secretary for communications Dennis Bloem and secretary for elections Mzwandile Hleko had themselves been suspended. A press conference called by Lekota descended into a fistfight between the rival factions.

Madisha was fired by COPE in June 2023.
