= Barney Pityana =

South African lawyer and theologian

The Reverend Barney Pityana FKC GCOB
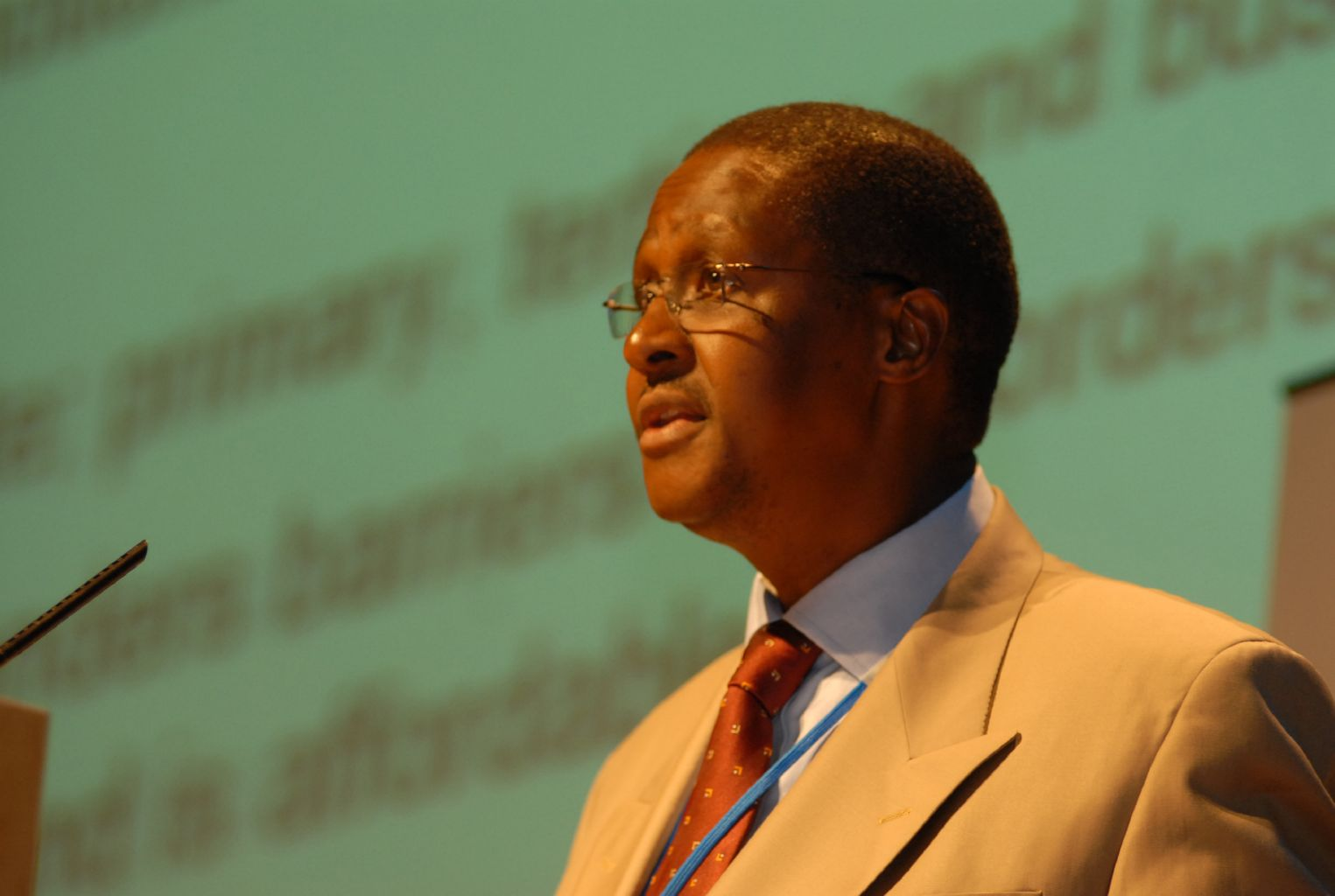
- Born: Nyameko Barney Pityana; 7 August 1945 (age 81); Uitenhage, Cape Province, Union of South Africa
- Citizenship: South African citizenship
- Education: University of South Africa; King's College London; Ripon College Cuddesdon
- Occupations: Human rights lawyer, politician and theologian
- Awards: Order of the Baobab in silver (2006)
- Religion: Christianity (Anglican)
- Church: Anglican Church of Southern Africa

Nyameko Barney Pityana FKC GCOB (born 7 August 1945) is a human rights lawyer and theologian in South Africa. He is an exponent of Black theology.

== Biography ==
Pityana was born in Uitenhage and attended the University of Fort Hare. He was one of the founding members of the South African Students' Organisation of the Black Consciousness Movement with Steve Biko and Harry Ranwedzi Nenwekhulu. He was also a member of the African National Congress Youth League, and was suspended for challenging the authority of the Afrikaans teachers and the apartheid principles of "Bantu education".

Pityana received a degree from the University of South Africa in 1976 but was barred from practicing law in Port Elizabeth by the apartheid government. He was banned by the apartheid government from public activity. Pityana went into exile in 1978, studying theology at King's College London and training for the ministry Ripon College Cuddesdon in Oxford. Thereafter he served as an Anglican curate in Milton Keynes and as a vicar in Birmingham. From 1988 to 1992 he was Director of the Programme to Combat Racism at the World Council of Churches in Geneva.

Pityana returned to South Africa in 1993, following the end of apartheid. He continued working in theology and human rights, completing a PhD in Religious Studies at the University of Cape Town in 1995. He was appointed a member of the South African Human Rights Commission in 1995, and served as chairman of the commission from 1995 to 2001. He also served on the African Commission on Human and Peoples' Rights at the Organisation of African Unity in 1997. Professor Pityana became Vice-Chancellor and Principal for the University of South Africa in 2001 and held the position for nine years.

In 2008 following the resignation of former President Thabo Mbeki as a President of South Africa, Prof Pityana and other former prominent ANC members formed a rival party to the ANC called Congress of the People. Those former ANC members and leaders included Allan Aubrey Boesak, Mosiuoa Gerard Patrick Lekota, Smuts Ngonyama, William Mothipa Madisha, Phumzile Mlambo-Ngcuka and many others who worked for the formation of COPE secretly.

Up to date, Prof Barney Pityana has not announced his return to the African National Congress instead the cabinet that is led by Cyril Ramaphosa appointed him at age 76 to chair the National Lotteries Commission.

He was the rector of the College of the Transfiguration (Anglican) in Grahamstown (from 2011 until 2014),

He is the President of Convocation of the University of Cape Town.

== Awards ==
His work in human rights has been widely recognised, and in December 2002, he was awarded an Honourable Mention of the 2002 UNESCO Prize for Human Rights Education.

== Current politics ==
He is founder of Congress of the People in 2008 and he has never made an announcement to leave it or join another political organisation. He is known to be a vocal critic of the former ANC leadership under Jacob Zuma, called for the resignation of Zuma, and has links with grassroots movements opposed to the ANC.

== See also ==
- List of people subject to banning orders under apartheid
