= Mafika Gwala =

South African poet and editor

Mafika Pascal Gwala (5 October 1946 – 5 September 2014) was a contemporary South African poet and editor, writing in English and Zulu.

== Early life and education ==
Mafika Gwala was born and grew up in Verulam, north of Durban, KwaZulu-Natal. He completed an M.Phil. in Politics from the University of Natal and was a researcher at Manchester University.

== Work and activism ==
Gwala spent most of his adult life in Mpumalanga Township, west of Durban. He worked in a factory, as a legal clerk, an industrial relations officer, a high school teacher, and a guest university lecturer, aside from writing and editing.

Gwala was active in the struggle against apartheid and a leading light of the 1970s Black Consciousness movement, of which he says:

We didn’t take Black Consciousness as a kind of Bible, it was just a trend, which was a necessary one because it meant bringing in what the white opposition [to apartheid] couldn’t bring into the struggle. So much was brought into the struggle through Black Consciousness.

== Writing ==
In 1982, Gwala published a book of Black Consciousness poetry in a collection called No More Lullabies. His work is characterised by a rhythmic musicality he attributes to the Zulu language. In 1991, he edited and translated into English a collection of Zulu writing entitled Musho! Zulu Popular Praises.

== Works ==
Poetry

- Jol'iinkomo (1977)
- No More Lullabies (1982)

Edited

- Black Review (1973)
- Musho! Zulu Popular Praises, with Liz Gunner (Michigan State University, 1991) ISBN 0-87013-306-3
