= Ginsberg, South Africa =

Township in South Africa

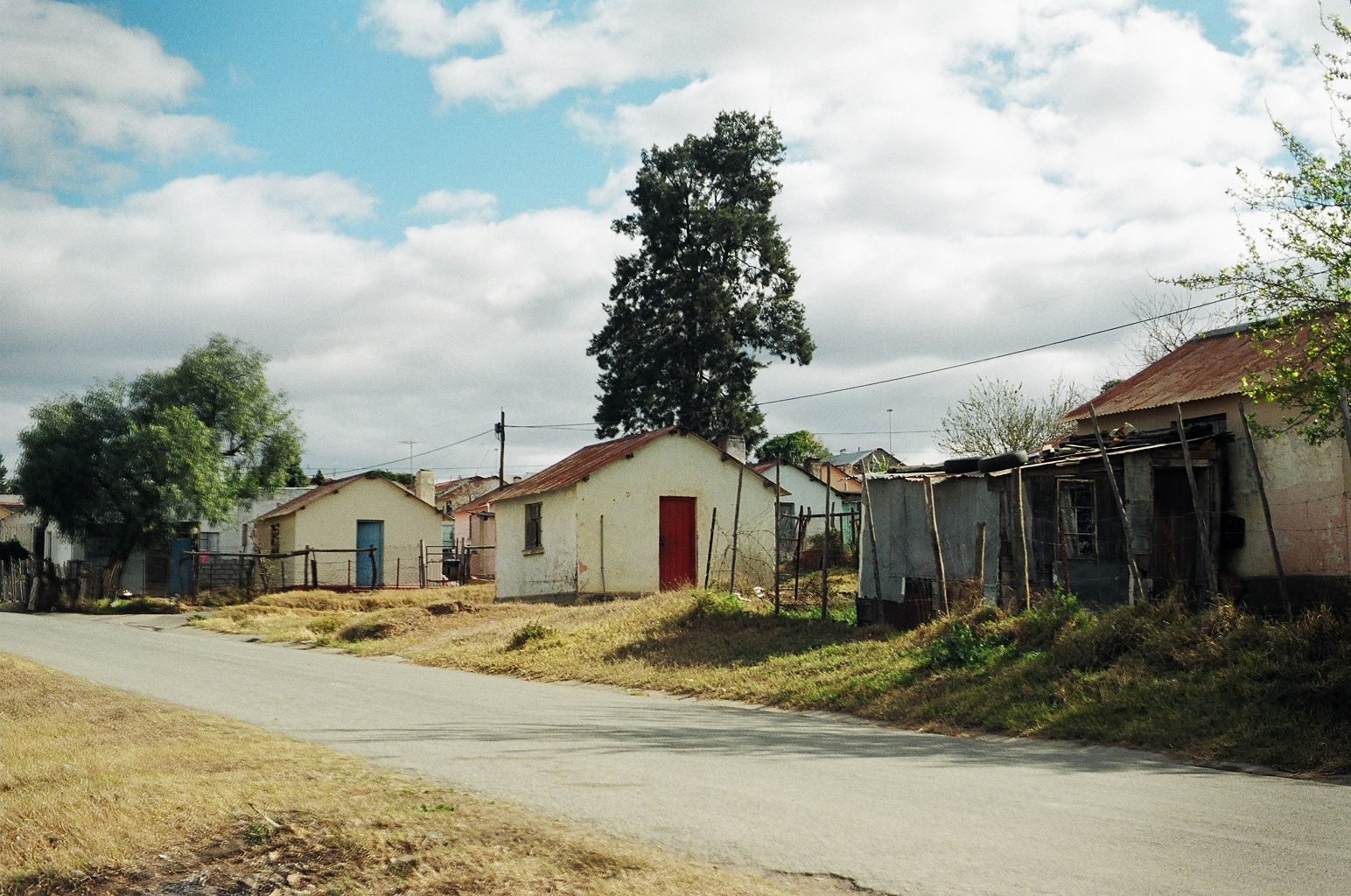
Ginsberg, Qonce, Eastern Cape, South Africa.

Ginsberg is a township on the west bank of the Buffalo River that is next to Qonce, the former King William's Town, in the Buffalo City Metropolitan Municipality, Eastern Cape, South Africa.

== History ==
Named after local councillor and member of parliament of the Cape Colony, Senator Franz Ginsberg, for his active role in the establishment of the township, Ginsberg was founded as a direct response to the outbreak of bubonic plague in the Cape Colony in 1901. According to the King William's Town council, the advent of the plague made better housing conditions and sanitary requirements prevalent, but it also gave impetus to efforts of segregating the town. Fifty wattle and daub huts, 17 foot in diameter with 6-foot walls, thatched roofs and two glazed windows, were subsequently erected by the council. They were built in five rows of 10, whitewashed inside and out, and contained flooring made of beaten ant heap. The new township of Ginsberg incorporated Tsolo location on the west bank of the Buffalo River.

The first residents of Ginsberg were drawn from a predominantly rural background, and were attracted to the, then, King William's Town by the prospect of finding work and accommodation. The town council initially charged 10 shillings per hut per month, which included an adjacent plot of land. To prevent overcrowding, the town council only allowed a maximum of six inhabitants per house. The immediate response from potential tenants was not enthusiastic. By the middle of December 1901 only 18 of the huts had been let because many black prospective inhabitants from town centre in King William's Town struggled to pay this amount in advance, as was required by the council. As more rural migrant workers came from outside King William's Town, the town council erected a further 30 huts. By 1908 two trail brick huts, roofed with iron and thatch respectively, were erected. This was viewed by the council as an improvement on the original wattle and daub huts. In the same year 116 houses were occupied by 503 people in Ginsberg. Sixty-two more rondavels were built in Ginsberg in 1924. There were three buildings in the township which served as both school and church. These buildings belonged to the Salvation Army and the English churches respectively. In 1939, black residents of Brownlee Station in the King William's Town centre were moved to Ginsberg by the white town council. During the 1970s, Ginsberg was a hive of political activity as its most famous son Steve Biko and Black Consciousness Movement members lived in the area. Biko had returned to the township after being banned from leaving the King William's Town magisterial district by the apartheid government in 1973. In 1975, he founded Zimele Trust Fund and Ginsberg Educational Trust to boost education and economic activity in the township.

== Today ==
According to Census 2011 Crmses, Ginsberg has a population of 10766, 90% of which speaks IsiXhosa and then 4.16% Afrikaans. Unemployment, poverty and alcoholism are rife in the township, which has been plagued by service delivery protests in recent years. One of the projects that is bringing hope to the township is the multimillion-rand Steve Biko Centre built by the Steve Biko Foundation and which first opened its doors in 2012. The centre houses the Steve Biko Garden of Remembrance and is a popular tourist attraction that employs locals.Two of its most famous faces are Zandile Msuthwana an actress and Steve Biko, anti apartheid activist.

== See also ==
- Qonce
- Zwelitsha
- Dimbaza
