= Malusi Mpumlwana =

Malusi Mpumlwana is a bishop of the Ethiopian Episcopal Church. Along with Steve Biko, he and his wife Thoko Mpumlwana were activists in the anti-apartheid Black Consciousness Movement in South Africa. He is currently the General Secretary of the South African Council of Churches (SACC), spearheading its work to lead common Christian action that works for moral witness in South Africa, addressing issues of social and economic justice, national reconciliation, the integrity of creation, eradication of poverty, and contributing towards the empowerment of those who are spiritually, socially and economically marginalized.

Malusi worked for the W.K. Kellogg Foundation which is headquartered in the city of Battle Creek, in the state of Michigan, in the USA. His title with the W.K. Kellogg Foundation was listed as, "Regional Director of Africa Programs".
