= Mosiuoa Lekota =

South African politician (1948–2026)

The Honourable Mosiuoa Lekota
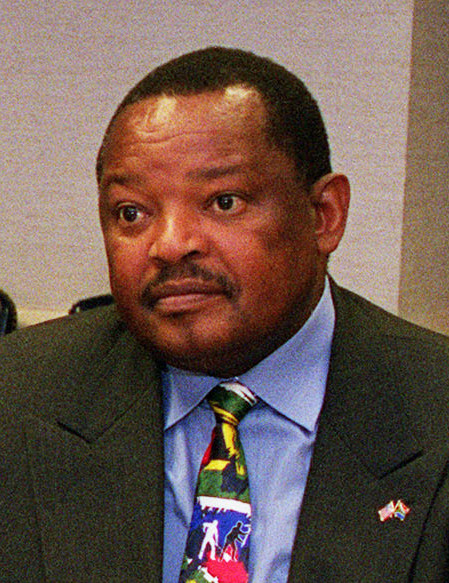
- Lekota in 1999

President of the Congress of the People
- In office 16 December 2008 – 4 March 2026
- Deputy: Mbhazima Shilowa; Lynda Odendaal; William Mothipa Madisha
- Preceded by: Office established
- Succeeded by: TBD

Minister of Defence
- In office 26 June 1999 – 25 September 2008
- President: Thabo Mbeki
- Preceded by: Joe Modise
- Succeeded by: Charles Nqakula

1st Chairperson of the National Council of Provinces
- In office 6 February 1997 – 21 June 1999
- Preceded by: Position established
- Succeeded by: Naledi Pandor

1st Premier of the Free State
- In office 7 May 1994 – 18 December 1996
- Succeeded by: Ivy Matsepe-Casaburri

Personal details
- Born: Mosiuoa Gerard Patrick Lekota; 13 August 1948 Kroonstad, South Africa
- Died: 4 March 2026 (aged 77) Johannesburg, South Africa
- Party: Congress of the People (2008–2026)
- Other political affiliations: African National Congress (1999–2008)
- Spouse: Cynthia Lekota
- Children: 4
- Occupation: Politician; Anti-apartheid activist
- Nickname: Terror Lekota

Mosiuoa Gerard Patrick Lekota (13 August 1948 – 4 March 2026) was a South African anti-Apartheid revolutionary for the African National Congress (ANC) who served jail time with Nelson Mandela from 1985 and who left the ANC to form the Congress of the People (Cope) splinter party in 2008. He served as its President from 16 December 2008.

Previously as a member of the African National Congress, under President Thabo Mbeki, he served in the Cabinet of South Africa as Minister of Defence from 17 June 1999 to 25 September 2008. His nickname Terror Lekota comes from his playing style on the soccer field. He was a leader of the United Democratic Front and a key defendant in the Delmas Treason Trial, 1985 to 1988.

== Early life and education ==
Lekota was born in Kroonstad. He had his primary education at Susanna Farm School and most of his secondary education at Mariazell High School in Matatiele. However, he matriculated at St. Francis College in Mariannhill in 1969. Although he enrolled for a social science degree at the University of the North, Lekota was expelled due to his Student Representative Council- and Black Consciousness Movement-aligned South African Students' Organisation (SASO) activities in 1972.

== Career ==
Lekota became a permanent organiser for SASO in 1974, but was imprisoned at Robben Island Prison for "conspiring to commit acts endangering the maintenance of law and order" during the same year. He had organised victory rallies to celebrate the independence of Mozambique. He was released from prison in 1982.

After his release, he was elected publicity secretary of the United Democratic Front (UDF) in 1983. In 1985, Lekota was detained and later sentenced in the Delmas Treason Trial. However, he was released in 1989 after the Appeal Court reviewed the sentence.

The Delmas Treason Trial was one of the most important treason trials in the last days of apartheid. It enunciated policies to be embodied in the post-apartheid society like non-racial equality before the law, reconciliation with major politicians who had supported apartheid and respect for the rule of law.

In 1990, Lekota became convenor of the African National Congress in Southern Natal and, in 1991, was elected to the ANC's National Executive Committee (NEC) and its National Working Committee (NWC). He was appointed the ANC's Chief of Intelligence in 1991 and elected as secretary for the organisation's electoral commission in 1992. After the first fully democratic elections in South Africa in 1994, Lekota was elected premier of the Free State province. He held this position until 1996.

Lekota subsequently served as the chairperson of the National Council of Provinces from 1997 to 1999, before being appointed Minister of Defence. In this position he was responsible for ordering eight A400M military transport aircraft from Airbus by the Armscor parastatal in 2005, for a price of R17bn. He was also elected as National Chairperson of the ANC in December 1997, a position which he held until 2007. He was succeeded by Baleka Mbete.

Following the resignation of President Thabo Mbeki in September 2008, Lekota was one of ten ministers who submitted their resignations, on 23 September.

=== Announcement of new party ===
On 8 October 2008, Lekota announced that the faction of the party that was loyal to Mbeki would serve "divorce papers", indicating a secession from the ANC and the creation of a new political party. This was duly carried out, making it the first mass schism from the ANC since the creation of the Pan Africanist Congress of Azania in 1959 during the apartheid period.

The announcement was both rejected and played down by leaders of the ANC, with heavy derision coming from the South African Communist Party. However, the announcement of a new party for disaffected members of the ANC was welcomed by opposition party leaders, including Helen Zille of the Democratic Alliance and Bantu Holomisa of the United Democratic Movement.

On 14 October, the ANC suspended both Lekota's and Mluleki George's memberships. After a further bout of legal squabbling with the ANC, it was decided that the new party be named the Congress of the People (COPE).

=== Leader of the Congress of the People ===
On 16 December 2008, Lekota announced his candidacy for the leadership of COPE: being the only candidate, he was elected without a vote and announced as the first President of COPE at the convention. His deputies, Mbhazima Shilowa and Lynda Odendaal, were also announced.

On 20 February 2009, Lekota lost the battle for his party's presidential candidacy to the former presiding bishop of the Methodist Church of Southern Africa, Mvume Dandala. Media reports suggested that Lekota had failed to endorse Dandala, and that party deputy leader Shilowa had played a key role in elevating Dandala over Lekota. Lekota's defeat in the leadership race was described as "a humiliating defeat [to a] political novice" by the influential Mail & Guardian newspaper.

Although, for some time subsequent to Dandala's victory, Lekota kept mum on the matter, on 5 February 2009, on his Facebook page, he spoke out, urging supporters of the new movement:

We should also not be distracted now by who serves in the interim leadership, because ultimately the people's voice will be heard. They will vote for their leaders, and everyone else will apply for a job and be interviewed to obtain any position.

A week prior to the election, speculation mounted that Lekota was set on repairing back to the ANC, as numerous other COPE defectors already had, but he clarified his stance in emphatic terms for The Sunday Times:

There is no way I can return to the company of men and women who are dead set on destroying the constitutional democracy which I gave most of my life to creating. I will go to the grave a member of the Congress of the People.

On the same day, ANC treasurer-general Mathews Phosa denied allegations that the ANC had been attempting to entice Lekota back: "Officially, I'm not aware of anyone who has been sent to Terror to ask him to come back. We have never sent people to approach him."

Lekota, for his part, alleged that rumours of a reunion with the ANC, bolstered by a reported SMS and his supposed unhappiness with COPE's internal structures, were fuelled by the ANC in its devious bid to derail its campaign. He had not, he said, held any of the meetings he was alleged to have had with his former party.

At 02:09 on the morning of Election Day, 22 April, Lekota issued a none-too-subtle jibe at Jacob Zuma. "Do not kill this country for one man," he urged his Facebook supporters, making ill-veiled reference to the promises of ANC Youth League leader Julius Malema to take up arms and murder for the ANC President. "Vote for hope, Vote COPE". Later, having cast his ballot, he announced:

my voteis [sic] not a secret. I voted for change, unity, anti corrupt government, better service delivery and hope for all. Do like wise [sic]. Vote COPE!

His son Prince did not follow in his father's footsteps, however, voting openly for the ANC.

Lekota did not take up a seat in Parliament after the election; instead, COPE decided that he should concentrate on organizing and building the party, together with Secretary-General Charlotte Lobe.

Due to infighting in the party, COPE suffered multiple defections in the run-up to the 2014 general elections. The party won only three seats in the National Assembly at the election, down from the 30 it had won in 2009. The party's support declined further in the 2019 general elections when it won only two seats in the National Assembly. COPE lost its parliamentary representation in the 2024 general election.

== Personal life and death ==
Lekota was married and had seven children, four with his wife Cynthia (one of whom died in 1996), one with former Cape Nature deputy chairwoman Yasmina Pandy, and two from other relationships.

Lekota died of cancer on 4 March 2026, at the age of 77.

== Controversies ==
=== HIV/AIDS controversy ===
On 25 February 2009, with elections just two months away, Lekota told News24 journalist Verashni Pillay that he could not say for certain that HIV causes AIDS. He said:

Look I am not an expert on HIV and AIDS and I don't want to venture an opinion on whether it does or not. I am not a medical doctor, so I will not comment on that.

The comments were widely criticised, with one national newspaper editor labelling them as "depressing" and "Thabo Mbeki's Aids denalism all over again". Under severe pressure to recant, Lekota told the BBC that "[t]he virus causes AIDS [...] I accept that."

Political offices
Preceded by Louis van der Watt as Administrator of the Orange Free State	Premier of the Free State; 7 May 1994 – 18 December 1996	Succeeded by Ivy Matsepe-Casaburri
Preceded by Joe Modise	Minister of Defence (South Africa); 1999–2008	Succeeded by Charles Nqakula
Party political offices
Preceded by Jacob Zuma	Chairman of the African National Congress; 1997–2007	Succeeded by Baleka Mbete
New political party	President of the Congress of the People; 2008–2026	Vacant
