= Azanian People's Organisation =

Political party in South Africa

- President: Nelvis Qekema
- Chairperson: Simphiwe Hashe
- Secretary-General: Chris Swepu
- Honorary President: Mosibudi Mangena
- Founder: Stephen Biko, Abram Onkgopotse Tiro, Harry Nengwekhulu, Mthuli ka Shezi, Mapetla Mohapi, Mongezi Sifika wa Nkomo and others.
- Founded: 28 April 1978
- Merger of: BCMA in exile and AZAPO inside South Africa
- Preceded by: Black People's Convention (BPC)
- Headquarters: Office Number 3, 5th Floor, Corner House, 77 Commissioner Street, Johannesburg
- Student wing: Azanian Students' Convention (AZASCO)
- Youth wing: Azanian Youth Organisation (AZAYO)
- Women's wing: Imbeleko Women's Organisation
- Armed wing: Azanian National Liberation Army (AZANLA) (formerly)
- Student Wing for High School Students: Azanian Students' Movement (AZASM)
- Ideology: Socialism; Black consciousness
- Political position: Left-wing to far-left
- Colours: Black, Red, and Orange
- Slogan: The People's Movement
- National Assembly seats: 0 / 400

Party flag

Website
- www.azapo.org.za

The Azanian People's Organisation (AZAPO) is a South African liberation movement and political party. The organisation's two student wings are the Azanian Students' Movement (AZASM) for high school learners and the Azanian Students' Convention (AZASCO) for university level students. The organisation's women's wing is Imbeleko Women's Organisation, simply known as IMBELEKO. Its inspiration is drawn from the Black Consciousness Movement inspired philosophy of Black Consciousness developed by Steve Biko, Harry Nengwekhulu, Abram Onkgopotse Tiro, Vuyelwa Mashalaba and others, as well as Marxist Scientific Socialism.

== History ==
AZAPO was formed out of the prominent black consciousness organisations namely, Black People's Convention (BPC), the South African Students' Organisation (SASO) and the Black Community Programmes (BCP). These were three of the 17 black consciousness organisations that were banned on Wednesday, 19 October 1977 for their role in the 16 June 1976 Soweto uprisings. A year after the formation of AZAPO, in September 1979, at its conference in Roodepoort, the national executive was elected with Curtis Nkondo as its president. During 1987, AZAPO was banned by the South African government and forced underground and into exile. It would be unbanned in 1990. In October 1994, AZAPO merged with its sister organisation in exile, the Black Consciousness Movement of Azania (BCMA).

AZAPO campaigned for the isolation of South Africa during its apartheid years by waging a "cultural boycott" in the country; black people increasingly regained their resolve to fight for their freedom and formed trade unions and civic organisations.

The armed wing of AZAPO was the Azanian National Liberation Army (AZANLA) which received support and military training from Iran, Yugoslavia, China, Libya, Botswana, Palestine, Syria, North Korea, Cuba, Zimbabwe and Eritrea. AZANLA is a successor to the Azanian People's Liberation Front (APLF) whose cadres received military training from countries such as Palestine, Syria, Lebanon and Iraq. There was an agreement with Iraq to train AZANLA combatants but that was thwarted by the First Gulf War in 1990. During the 1980s, it was engaged in a bloody internecine feud with the ANC which operated under the guise of the United Democratic Front (UDF).

AZAPO, along with its youth wing AZAYO were unbanned in 1990, which permitted it to continue its political programs legally. It was invited, but refused to participate in, the negotiations to end apartheid, a decision which led to the resignation of two senior members, Monwabisi Vuza and Imraan Moosa. The party then boycotted the 1994 elections, but has participated in each of the elections since then. AZAPO won one seat in each of the 1999, 2004 and 2009 elections, but failed to win a seat in the 2014 general election.

The current leader (National President) of the party is Nelvis Qekema who was elected at the 25th National Congress held at University of Johannesburg, Soweto on December 4, 2021. He succeeded Strike Thokoane who was elected as president of AZAPO in 2017, during the party's 23rd National Congress in Meadowlands, Soweto.

In February 2022, AZAPO and the Pan Africanist Congress of Azania (PAC) announced a new unity pact with the intention to contest elections together.

== Negotiations with SOPA ==
The party has had regular negotiations with SOPA aimed at merging the two parties, but these broke down in 2004, 2007 and again in 2013.

== Election results ==
=== National Assembly elections ===
Election	Total votes	Share of vote	Seats	+/–	Government
1999	27,257	0.17%	1 / 400	New	Opposition
2004	39,116	0.25%	1 / 400	0	Opposition
2009	38,245	0.22%	1 / 400	0	Opposition
2014	20,421	0.11%	0 / 400	▼1	Extra-parliamentary
2019	12,823	0.07%	0 / 400	0	Extra-parliamentary
2024	19,048	0.12% (Note: From 2024, seats in the National Assembly are determined by a combination of the national ballot, and the nine regional ballots. Only the national ballot figures are shown here.)	0 / 400	0	Extra-parliamentary

=== Provincial elections ===
Election	Eastern Cape		Free State		Gauteng		Kwazulu-Natal		Limpopo		Mpumalanga		North-West		Northern Cape		Western Cape	
Election	%	Seats	%	Seats	%	Seats	%	Seats	%	Seats	%	Seats	%	Seats	%	Seats	%	Seats
1999					0.16	0/73	0.17	0/80	0.54	0/49	0.10	0/30			0.41	0/30		
2004	0.17	0/63	0.35	0/30	0.25	0/73	0.26	0/80	0.51	0/49	0.19	0/30	0.29	0/33	0.52	0/30	0.09	0/42
2009	0.20	0/63			0.21	0/73			0.38	0/49	0.23	0/30	0.25	0/33	0.60	0/30	0.07	0/42
2014	0.12	0/63	0.16	0/30	0.12	0/73	0.15	0/80	0.26	0/49	0.09	0/30	0.17	0/33	0.25	0/30	0.04	0/42
2019	0.08	0/63	0.09	0/30	0.08	0/73	0.07	0/80	0.17	0/49	0.04	0/30	0.08	0/33	0.25	0/30	0.02	0/42
2024	0.22	0/73			0.12	0/80											0.04	0/42

=== Municipal elections ===
Election	Votes	%	+/–
2000		0.3%	
2006	74,627	0.3%	
2011	50,631	0.2%	
2016	28,049	0.07%	
2021	17,744	0.06%	
