= Black Consciousness Movement =

South African anti-apartheid movement, 1960s

The Black Consciousness Movement (BCM) was a grassroots anti-apartheid activist movement that emerged in South Africa in the mid-1960s out of the political vacuum created by the jailing and banning of the ANC and Pan Africanist Congress leadership after the Sharpeville Massacre in 1960. The BCM represented a social movement for political consciousness.

[Black Consciousness'] origins were deeply rooted in Christianity. In 1966, the Anglican Church under the incumbent, Archbishop Robert Selby Taylor, convened a meeting which later on led to the foundation of the University Christian Movement (UCM). This was to become the vehicle for Black Consciousness.

The BCM attacked what they saw as traditional white values, especially the "condescending" values of white liberals. They refused to engage white liberal opinion on the pros and cons of black consciousness, and emphasised the rejection of white monopoly on truth as a central tenet of their movement While this philosophy at first generated disagreement amongst black anti-apartheid activists within South Africa, it was soon adopted by most as a positive development. As a result, there emerged a greater cohesiveness and solidarity amongst black groups in general, which in turn brought black consciousness to the forefront of the anti-apartheid struggle within South Africa.

The BCM's policy of perpetually challenging the dialectic of apartheid South Africa as a means of transforming Black thought into rejecting prevailing opinion or mythology to attain a larger comprehension brought it into direct conflict with the full force of the security apparatus of the apartheid regime. "Black man, you are on your own" became the rallying cry as mushrooming activity committees implemented what was to become a relentless campaign of challenge to what was then referred to by the BCM as "the system". It eventually sparked a confrontation on 16 June 1976 in the Soweto uprising, when Black children marched to protest both linguistic imperialism and coercive Afrikaans medium education in the townships. In response, 176 of the child protesters were fatally shot by South African security forces and both outrage and unrest spread by lesepa voetsek implemented a system of comprehensive local committees to facilitate organised resistance, the BCM itself was decimated by security action taken against its leaders and social programs. By 19 June 1976, 123 key members had been banned and assigned to internal exile in remote rural districts. In 1977, all BCM related organisations were banned, many of its leaders arrested, and their social programs dismantled under provisions of the newly implemented Internal Security Amendment Act. On 12 September 1977, its banned National Leader, Steve Bantu Biko died from injuries that resulted from brutal assault while in the custody of the South African Police.

== History ==
The Black Consciousness Movement started to develop during the late 1960s, and was led by Steve Biko, Mamphela Ramphele, and Barney Pityana. During this period, which overlapped with apartheid, the African National Congress (ANC) had committed to an armed struggle through its military wing Umkhonto we Sizwe, but this small guerrilla army was neither able to seize and hold territory in South Africa nor to win significant concessions through its efforts. The ANC had been banned by apartheid leaders, and although the famed Freedom Charter remained in circulation in spite of attempts to censor it, for many students, the ANC had disappeared.

The term Black Consciousness stems from American academic W. E. B. Du Bois's evaluation of the double consciousness of black Americans, analyzing the internal conflict that black, or subordinated, people experience living in an oppressive society. Du Bois echoed Civil War era black nationalist Martin Delany's insistence that black people take pride in their blackness as an important step in their personal liberation. This line of thought was also reflected in the Pan-Africanist, Marcus Garvey, as well as Harlem Renaissance philosopher Alain Locke and in the salons of the sisters, Paulette and Jane Nardal in Paris. Biko's understanding of these thinkers was further shaped through the lens of postcolonial thinkers such as Frantz Fanon, Léopold Senghor, and Aimé Césaire. Biko reflects the concern for the existential struggle of the black person as a human being, dignified and proud of his blackness, in spite of the oppression of colonialism. The aim of this global movement of black thinkers was to build black consciousness and African consciousness, which they felt had been suppressed under colonialism.

Part of the insight of the Black Consciousness Movement was in understanding that black liberation would not only come from imagining and fighting for structural political changes, as older movements such as the ANC had done, but also from psychological transformation in the minds of black people themselves. This analysis suggested that to take power, black people had to believe in the value of their blackness. That is, if black people believed in democracy, but did not believe in their own value, they would not truly be committed to gaining power.

Along these lines, Biko saw the struggle to build African consciousness as having two stages: "Psychological liberation" and "Physical liberation". While at times Biko embraced the non-violent tactics of Mahatma Gandhi and Martin Luther King Jr., this was not because Biko fully embraced their spiritually-based philosophies of non-violence. Rather, Biko knew that for his struggle to give rise to physical liberation, it was necessary that it exist within the political and military realities of the apartheid regime, in which the armed power of the white government outmatched that of the black majority. Therefore, Biko's non-violence may be seen more as a tactic than a personal conviction. However, along with political action, a major component of the Black Consciousness Movement was its Black Community Programs, which included the organisation of community medical clinics, aiding entrepreneurs, and holding "consciousness" classes and adult education literacy classes.

Another important component of psychological liberation was to embrace blackness by insisting that black people lead movements of black liberation. This meant rejecting the fervent "non-racialism" of the ANC in favour of asking whites to understand and support, but not to take leadership in, the Black Consciousness Movement. A parallel can be seen in the United States, where student leaders of later phases of SNCC, and black nationalists such as Malcolm X, rejected white participation in organisations that intended to build black power. While the ANC viewed white participation in its struggle as part of enacting the non-racial future for which it was fighting, the Black Consciousness view was that even well-intentioned white people often re-enacted the paternalism of the society in which they lived. This view held that in a profoundly racialised society, black people had to first liberate themselves and gain psychological, physical and political power for themselves before "non-racial" organisations could truly be non-racial.

Biko's BCM had much in common with other left-wing African nationalist movements of the time, such as Amílcar Cabral's PAIGC and Huey Newton's Black Panther Party.

=== Early years: 1960–1976 ===
In 1959, just leading up to this period, the National Party (NP) established universities that were exclusively for black students. This action aligned with the Party's goal of ensuring racial segregation in all educational systems. Although the ANC and others opposed to apartheid had initially focused on non-violent campaigns, the brutality of the Sharpeville massacre of 21 March 1960 caused many black people to embrace the idea of violent resistance to apartheid. However, although the ANC's armed wing started its campaign in 1962, no victory was in sight by the time that Steve Biko was a medical student in the late 1960s. This is because the organization was banned in 1960, preventing it from having a strong influence in South African politics for approximately two decades. During this same time, students of colour "marched out" of the National Union of South African Students organization which, although it was multiracial, was still "dominated" by white students. Even as the nation's leading opposition groups, such as the ANC, proclaimed a commitment to armed struggle, their leaders had failed to organise a credible military effort. If their commitment to revolution had inspired many, the success of the white regime in squashing it had dampened the spirits of many.

It was in this context that black students, Biko most notable among them, began critiquing the liberal whites with whom they worked in anti-apartheid student groups, as well as the official non-racialism of the ANC. They saw progress towards power as requiring the development of black power distinct from supposedly "non-racial groups". This new Black Consciousness Movement not only called for resistance to the policy of apartheid, freedom of speech, and more rights for South African blacks who were oppressed by the white apartheid regime, but also black pride and a readiness to make blackness, rather than simple liberal democracy, the rallying point of unapologetically black organisations. Importantly, the group defined black to include other "people of color" in South Africa, most notably the large number of South Africans of Indian descent. In this way, the Black Consciousness Movement provided a space for the "unity of South Africa's oppressed" in a way that the students defined for themselves. The movement stirred many blacks to confront not only the legal but also the cultural and psychological realities of Apartheid, seeking "not black visibility but real black participation" in society and in political struggles.

The gains this movement made were widespread across South Africa. Many black people felt a new sense of pride about being black as the movement helped to expose and critique the inferiority complex felt by many blacks at the time. The group formed Formation Schools to provide leadership seminars, and placed a great importance on decentralisation and autonomy, with no person serving as president for more than one year (although Biko was clearly the primary leader of the movement). Early leaders of the movement such as Bennie Khoapa, Barney Pityana, Mapetla Mohapi, and Mamphela Ramphele joined Biko in establishing the Black Community Programmes (BCP) in 1970 as self-help groups for black communities, forming out of the South African Council of Churches and the Christian Institute. Their approach to development was strongly influenced by Paulo Freire. They also published various journals, including the Black Review, Black Voice, Black Perspective, and Creativity in Development.

On top of building schools and day cares and taking part in other social projects, the BCM through the BCP was involved in the staging of the large-scale protests and workers' strikes that gripped the nation in 1972 and 1973, especially in Durban. Indeed, in 1973 the government of South Africa began to clamp down on the movement, claiming that their ideas of black development were treasonous, and virtually the entire leadership of SASO and BCP were banned. In late August and September 1974, after holding rallies in support of the FRELIMO government which had taken power in Mozambique, many leaders of the BCM were arrested under the Terrorism Act and the Riotous Assemblies Act, 1956. Arrests under these laws allowed the suspension of the doctrine of habeas corpus, and many of those arrested were not formally charged until the next year, resulting in the arrest of the "Pretoria Twelve" and conviction of the "SASO nine", which included Aubrey Mokoape and Patrick Lekota. These were the most prominent among various public trials that gave a forum for members of the BCM to explain their philosophy and to describe the abuses that had been inflicted upon them. Far from crushing the movement, this led to its wider support among black and white South Africans.

=== Post-Soweto uprising: 1976–present ===
The Black Consciousness Movement heavily supported the protests against the policies of the apartheid regime which led to the Soweto uprising in June 1976. The protests began when it was decreed that black students be forced to learn Afrikaans, and that many secondary school classes were to be taught in that language. This was another encroachment against the black population, which generally spoke indigenous languages such as Zulu and Xhosa at home, and saw English as offering more prospects for mobility and economic self-sufficiency than did Afrikaans. And the notion that Afrikaans was to define the national identity stood directly against the BCM principle of the development of a unique black identity. The protest began as a non-violent demonstration before police responded violently. The protest devolved into a riot. The official number for the number of protestors killed is 176, however, estimates range up to nearly 600, the vast majority of whom were young black South Africans.

The government's efforts to suppress the growing movement led to the imprisonment of Steve Biko, who became a symbol of the struggle. Biko died in police custody on 12 September 1977. Steve Biko was a non-violent activist, even though the movement he helped start eventually took up violent resistance. White newspaper editor Donald Woods supported the movement and Biko, whom he had befriended, by leaving South Africa and exposing the truth behind Biko's death at the hands of police by publishing the book Biko.

One month after Biko's death, on 19 October 1977, now known as "Black Wednesday" the South African government declared 19 groups associated with the Black Consciousness Movement to be illegal. Following this, many members joined more concretely political and tightly structured parties such as the ANC, which used underground cells to maintain their organisational integrity despite banning by the government. And it seemed to some that the key goals of Black Consciousness had been attained, in that black identity and psychological liberation were growing. Nonetheless, in the months following Biko's death, activists continued to hold meetings to discuss resistance. Along with members of the BCM, a new generation of activists who had been inspired by the Soweto riots and Biko's death were present, including Bishop Desmond Tutu. Among the organisations that formed in these meetings to carry the torch of Black Consciousness was the Azanian People's Organisation (AZAPO), which persists to this day.

Almost immediately after the formation of AZAPO in 1978, its chairman, Ishmael Mkhabela, and secretary, Lybon Mabasa were detained under the Terrorism Act. In the following years, other groups sharing Black Consciousness principles formed, including the Congress of South African Students (COSAS), Azanian Student Organisation (AZASO) and the Port Elizabeth Black Civic Organisation (PEBCO).

While many of these organisations still exist in some form, some evolved and could no longer be called parts of the Black Consciousness Movement. And as the influence of the Black Consciousness Movement itself waned, the ANC was returning to its role as the clearly leading force in the resistance to white rule. Still more former members of the Black Consciousness Movement continued to join the ANC, including Thozamile Botha from PEBCO.

Others formed new groups. For instance, in 1980, Pityana formed the Black Consciousness Movement of Azania (BCMA), an avowedly Marxist group which used AZAPO as its political voice. Curtis Nkondo from AZAPO and many members of AZASO and the Black Consciousness Media Workers Association joined the United Democratic Front (UDF). Many groups published important newsletters and journals, such as the Kwasala of the Black Consciousness Media Workers and the London-based BCMA journal Solidarity.

And beyond these groups and media outlets, the Black Consciousness Movement had an extremely broad legacy, even as the movement itself was no longer represented by a single organisation.

While the Black Consciousness Movement itself spawned an array of smaller groups, many people who came of age as activists in the Black Consciousness Movement did not join them. Instead, they joined other organisations, including the ANC, the Unity Movement, the Pan Africanist Congress, the United Democratic Front and trade and civic unions.

The most lasting legacy of the Black Consciousness Movement is as an intellectual movement. The weakness of theory in and of itself to mobilise constituencies can be seen in AZAPO's inability to win significant electoral support in modern-day South Africa. But the strength of the ideas can be seen in the diffusion of Black Consciousness language and strategy into most corners of black South African politics.

In fact, these ideas helped make the complexity of the South African black political world, which can be so daunting to the newcomer or the casual observer, into a strength. As the government tried to act against this organisation or that one, people in many organisations shared the general ideas of the Black Consciousness Movement, and these ideas helped to organise action beyond any specific organisational agenda. If the leader of this group or that one was thrown into prison, nonetheless, more and more black South Africans agreed on the importance of black leadership and active resistance. Partly as a result, the difficult goal of unity in struggle became more and more realised through the late 1970s and 1980s.

Biko and the legacy of the Black Consciousness Movement helped give the resistance a culture of fearlessness. And its emphasis on individual psychological pride helped ordinary people realise they could not wait for distant leaders (who were often exiled or in prison) to liberate them. As the ANC's formal armed wing Umkhonto We Sizwe struggled to make gains, this new fearlessness became the basis of a new battle in the streets, in which larger and larger groups of ordinary and often unarmed people confronted the police and the army more and more aggressively. If the ANC could not defeat the white government's massive army with small bands of professional guerrilla fighters, it was able to eventually win power through ordinary black peoples' determination to make South Africa ungovernable by a white government. What could not be achieved by men with guns was accomplished by teenagers throwing stones. While much of this later phase of the struggle was not undertaken under the formal direction of Black Consciousness groups per se, it was certainly fuelled by the spirit of Black Consciousness.

Even after the end of apartheid, Black Consciousness politics live on in community development projects and "acts of dissent" staged both to bring about change and to further develop a distinct black identity.

In black townships during the 1980s, rivalry between black-consciousness adherents belonging to Azapo and the UDF led to violence. This deadly violence was most pronounced in Soweto.

== Controversies and criticism ==
A balanced analysis of the results and legacy of the Black Consciousness Movement would no doubt find a variety of perspectives. A list of research resources is listed at the end of this section including Columbia University's Project on Black Consciousness and Biko's Legacy.

Criticisms of the movement sometimes mirror similar observations of the Black Consciousness Movement in the United States. On one side, it was argued that the movement would stagnate into black racialism, aggravate racial tensions and attract repression by the apartheid regime. Further, the objective of the movement was to perpetuate a racial divide – apartheid for the Blacks, equivalent to that which existed under the National Party rule. Other detractors thought the movement was based heavily on student idealism, but with little grassroots support among the masses, and few consistent links to the mass trade-union movement.

Assessments of the movement note that it failed to achieve several of its key objectives. It did not bring down the apartheid regime, nor did its appeal to other non-white groups as "people of color" gain much traction. Its focus on blackness as the major organising principle was very much downplayed by Nelson Mandela and his successors who to the contrary emphasised the multi-racial balance needed for the post-apartheid nation. The community programs fostered by the movement were very small in scope and were subordinated to the demands of protest and indoctrination. Its leadership and structure was essentially liquidated, and it failed to bridge the tribal gap in any *large-scale* way, although certainly small groups and individuals collaborated across tribes.

After much blood shed and property destroyed, critics charged that the movement did nothing more than raise "awareness" of some issues, while accomplishing little in the way of sustained mass organisation, or of practical benefit for the masses. Some detractors also assert that Black consciousness ideas are out-dated, hindering the new multi-racial South Africa.

According to Pallo Jordan "The great tragedy of the Black Consciousness Movement (BCM) was that it was never able to gather and retain much support beyond a narrow band of African intellectuals."

== Funding ==
The Zimele Trust Fund was a trust fund created by the black consciousness movement to fund black community programmes (BCP's). Many of the community programmes that were funded were located in rural areas in the Eastern Cape and some in Kwa-Zulu Natal.

In May 1972, the Black Consciousness movement sponsored a church conference which aimed at creating a more "black orientated" perspective of the Christian gospel. Church organizations assisted BCPs and many BCPs assisted religious organisations to run church programmes. This resulted in a collaboration between political activists & religious leaders for the improvement of communities through a multitude of projects. The Trust Fund was officially established in 1975 by Steve Biko on order to fund these projects. The capital for many of these projects came from fundraising done by Father Aelred Stubbs through churches in Europe.The first funding opportunity was to assist newly released political prisoners and the start up costs income gathering families. This assisted in economically restabilising the families of those with "political" criminal records as many communities branded these activists as trouble makers, making it difficult for them to secure employment. The Trust fund also supported families through bursaries and scholarships for activists children as activists struggled to secure bursaries and scholarships for their children due to stigmatisation. The trust, much like the black consciousness movement, aimed at assisting people towards becoming self-sufficient. They presented this to the authorities as a project run by Thenjiwe Mtintso and the Border Council of Churches. The director of the fund was South African Students' Organisation (SASO) leader Mapetla Mohapi. The fund succeeded with a brick-making scheme in Dimbaza close to King William's Town. Other self-reliance projects included Zanempilo Community Health Care Centre, Njwaxa Leather-Works Project and the Ginsberg Education Fund. The trust fund assisted people regardless of political affiliation.

== Literature ==
In comparison with the Black Power movement in the United States, the Black Consciousness movement felt little need to reconstruct any sort of golden cultural heritage. African linguistic and cultural traditions were alive and well in the country. Short stories published predominantly in Drum magazine had led to the 1950s being called the Drum decade, and future Nobel Prize winner Nadine Gordimer was beginning to become active. The fallout from the Sharpeville massacre led to many of those artists entering exile, but the political oppression of the resistance itself led to a new growth of black South African Literature. In the 1970s, Staffrider magazine became the dominant forum for the publication of BC literature, mostly in the form of poetry and short stories. Book clubs, youth associations, and clandestine street-to-street exchange became popular. Various authors explored the Soweto riots in novels, including Miriam Tlali, Mothobi Mutloatse and Mbulelo Mzamane. But the most compelling force in Black Consciousness prose was the short story, now adapted to teach political morals. Mtutuzeli Matshoba famously wrote, "Do not say to me that I am a man." An important theme of Black Consciousness literature was the rediscovery of the ordinary, which can be used to describe the work of Njabulo Ndebele. Constructing Black Consciousness in Postcolonial Literature: A Case Study of Sindiwe Magona's Mother to Mother (1998) is among the works that deal with Black Consciousness in the postcolonial Africa with a specific case study of Magona's Mother to Mother. The author, Lassana Kanté has developed the strategic development of Black Consciousness as an ideology and literary tools. He has also developed black consciousness' vision in regard to themes and ideologies developed by Magona in relation to postcolonial Africa. Lassana Kanté (2025), Constructing Black Consciousness in Postcolonial Literature: A Case Study of Sindiwe Magona's Mother to Mother (1998), Lambert Academic Publishing, 100 pages. Lassana Kanté worked on Racism and Black Consciousness during his journey for his master studies. However, it was in poetry that the Black Consciousness Movement first found its voice. In a sense, this was a modern update of an old tradition, since several of South Africa's African languages had long traditions of performed poetry. Sipho Sempala, Mongane Serote, and Mafika Gwala led the way, although Sempala turned to prose after Soweto. Serote wrote from exile of his internalisation of the struggles, while Gwala's work was informed and inspired by the difficulty of life in his home township of Mpumalanga near Durban. These forerunners inspired a myriad of followers, most notably poet-performance artist Ingoapele Madingoane.

Adam Small is noted as a Coloured South African writer who was involved in the Black Consciousness Movement and wrote works in Afrikaans and English dealing with racial discrimination.

James Mathews was a part of the Drum decade who was especially influential to the Black Consciousness Movement. This poem gives an idea of the frustrations that blacks felt under apartheid:

Freedom's child
You have been denied too long
Fill your lungs and cry rage
Step forward and take your rightful place
You are not going to grow up knocking at the back door....

This poem by an unknown author has a rather confrontational look:

Kaffer man, Kaffer nation
Arise, arise from the kaffer
Prepare yourself for war!
We are about to start

Steve Biko, the hero of Mandlenkosi Langa's poem: "Banned for Blackness", also calls for black resistance:

Look up, black man, quit stuttering and shuffling
Look up, black man, quit whining and stooping
...raise up your black fist in anger and vengeance.

A main tenet of the Black Consciousness Movement itself was the development of black culture, and thus black literature. The cleavages in South African society were real, and the poets and writers of the BCM saw themselves as spokespersons for blacks in the country. They refused to be beholden to proper grammar and style, searching for black aesthetics and black literary values. The attempt to awaken a black cultural identity was thus inextricably tied up with the development of black literature.

=== Black Review ===
This paper was consisted of an analysis of political trends. It was edited by Steve Biko and published in 1972. The editorial was created for the purposes of protecting the interests of black people. Members of the BCM found that there were very few publications in South Africa that were written, directed and produced by black writers. The articles were juxtaposed to the reality of black peoples lives in order to portray the broad spectrum of problems black people faced. Black Viewpoint was a literature addition to the Black Community Programmes. The editorial wrote reviews and gave feedback on the different black Community Programmes that were taking place such as the Zanempilo Community Health Care Centre. Black Review was banned prior to Biko's banning.

=== Black Viewpoint ===
This was a compilation of essays that were written by black people for black people. The author was Njabulo Ndebele and was published in 1972 by the Spros-Cas Black Community Programmes. Steve Biko wrote the introduction. It includes "Black Development Day" written by Njabulo Ndebele, "New Day" written by C. M. C. Ndamse, "Kwa-Zulu Development" written by Chief M. G Buthelezi and "The New Black" written by Bennie A. Khoapa.

Another similar magazine publication was the Frank Talk, which was published in 1984. Several issues of the journal were banned for distribution due to government legislation; however, they were later unbanned.

== Bans ==
People who were under South African orders were not allowed to write for publication. People were also prohibited from quoting anything that banned people said. People under banning orders were prohibited from entering various buildings, including courts, educational institutions, the offices of newspapers and other publishers' offices.

== Important figures ==
- Steve Biko – founder
- Bennie Khoapa
- Mapetla Mohapi
- Strini Moodley
- Malusi Mpumlwana
- Thamsanga Mnyele – artist
- Rubin Phillip – cleric
- Barney Pityana
- Mamphela Ramphele
- Mthuli ka Shezi – playwright
- Aubrey Mokoape
- Barney Simon – founder of The Market Theatre
- Vuyisile Mini – activist and songwriter

== Related groups ==
- Azanian People's Organisation (AZAPO)
- Black Allied Workers' Union (BAWU)
- Black People's Convention
- Black Community Programmes
- Négritude, a literary movement in francophone Africa
- Neo Black Movement of Africa
- Socialist Party of Azania (SOPA)
- South African Student Organisation (SASO)

== See also ==
- Black-owned businesses
- Africana womanism
- Black Power
- Black Power Revolution
- Black Surrealism
- Négritude
- Zanempilo Community Health Care Centre
- Soweto Uprising
- Steve Biko Foundation
- I Write What I Like
- Ginsberg, Eastern Cape

Kanté, L. (2025). Constructing Black consciousness in postcolonial literature: A case study of Sindiwe Magona's Mother to Mother (1998). LAP LAMBERT Academic Publishing.
