= South African Students' Organisation =

Black university students organization (1969–1977)

- Formation: July 1969
- Dissolved: October 1977 (de facto)
- Headquarters: Durban, South Africa
- Origins: Black Consciousness Movement
- Founding President: Steve Biko

The South African Students' Organisation (SASO) was a body of black South African university students who resisted apartheid through non-violent political action. The organisation was formed in 1969 under the leadership of Steve Biko and Barney Pityana and made vital contributions to the ideology and political leadership of the Black Consciousness Movement. It was banned by the South African government in October 1977, as part of the repressive state response to the Soweto uprising.

== Formation ==
The founding members of the South African Students' Organisation (SASO) were black students from the University of Fort Hare, the University of Zululand, the University of the North at Turfloop, the so-called Black Section of the University of Natal (UNB), various theological seminaries and teacher training colleges, and other institutions of higher education in South Africa, which at the time were segregated under the apartheid-era Bantu Education Act. However, SASO has its roots in two other student organisations, which had emerged as focal points for student-led resistance to apartheid during the heightened state repression of the 1960s. The first was the National Union of South African Students (NUSAS), the main nationwide progressive students' union, with a decades-long history of political activism. The second was the University Christian Movement (UCM), an ecumenical students' association which, partly because of the growing influence of black theology, attracted a membership of politically inclined black Christians. Both NUSAS and the UCM were multiracial, but their membership and leadership were dominated by white students, a major point of concern for some black members. In the case of NUSAS, the black students in question also disagreed politically with white liberals in the organisation, who at the time outnumbered those advocating for a more radical stance on apartheid.

At the 1968 NUSAS conference in Grahamstown, black students broke off to discuss separately the problems facing black students and the best means by which to address them. However, according to a SASO memorandum, SASO definitively began to take shape at a similar breakaway from the UCM conference in July of the same year, held in Stutterheim. There, the memo recalls, "a group of about 40 blacks ... resolved themselves into a black caucus and debated the possibility of forming a black students organisation". The meeting was attended and spearheaded by Steve Biko and Barney Pityana, who, in that order, were later to become SASO's first two presidents. After another consultative meeting organised by UNB students in December 1968, SASO was officially launched in July 1969 at its inaugural conference, held at the Turfloop campus of the University of the North, where its constitution was ratified. In subsequent years, SASO evaded serious state repression, at least initially, and its membership grew on black campuses across South Africa, from a base of fourteen branches (four in seminaries, and the largest at Turfloop) in June 1970. Its main office was located in Durban.

== Ideology ==
According to its 1971 policy manifesto:

SASO is a Black Student Organisation working for the liberation of the Black man first from the psychological oppression by themselves through inferiority complex and secondly from physical oppression accruing out of living in a White racist society.

SASO's establishment coincided with the earliest stirrings of the Black Consciousness Movement, which was perhaps the most important anti-apartheid force inside South Africa for much of the 1970s, and with which it was strongly aligned. The development of SASO is often viewed as coterminous with the development of the broader movement and its ideology. Indeed, according to sociologist Saleem Badat, the movement was "largely the achievement of SASO", which contributed its key ideas and intellectuals, and which provided the movement with its ideological, political, and organisational leadership. Accordingly, SASO actively encouraged the formation of other Black Consciousness groups to represent segments of civil society beyond university students, and it cooperated closely with those groups in line with its ideals of black cohesion and solidarity. Allied groups included the South African Students Movement; the Black People's Convention (BPC), an umbrella political body; and the Black Allied Workers' Union, whose formation was partly the result of a resolution of the SASO conference in 1972.

SASO Policy Manifesto, 1971

SASO believes:

- South Africa is a country in which both Black and White live and shall continue to live together,
- That the Whiteman must be aware that one is either part of the solution or part of the problem,
- That, in this context, because of the privileges accorded to them by legislation and because of their continual maintenance of an oppressive regime, Whites have defined themselves as part of the problem,
- That, therefore, we believe that in all matters relating to the struggle towards realising our aspirations, Whites must be excluded...

=== Black self-reliance ===
Reflecting the terms of the founders' dissatisfaction with NUSAS and UCM, membership of SASO was restricted to blacks only – although "black", in the Black Consciousness movement, was used as a positive identification for those formerly known as "non-white", and therefore included Indians and Coloureds as well as so-called black Africans. This exclusivity was viewed as allowing blacks "to forge solidarity and unity and formulate their political beliefs and goals", and therefore was to enable both black self-reflection and black self-reliance in leading political change. A popular motto of both the organisation and the movement was coined by Pityana: "Black man you are on your own".

The same strategy implied a general policy against cooperation with white or multiracial organisations and with white activists. By 1970, the SASO executive had formally withdrawn its recognition of NUSAS as the pre-eminent national students' union, arguing that "in the principles and make-up of NUSAS, the black students can never find expression for aspirations foremost in their minds". At a meeting with the NUSAS executive in March 1971, the SASO executive made clear that it was "not expedient" for it to cooperate with organisations led by or including whites – though the organisations did agree to remain in contact to exchange information as required. However, as Badat argues, SASO was not "anti-white": it broadly endorsed a vision of a future South Africa as a non-racial society, and some SASO activists maintained personal relationships with white activists, as did Biko with NUSAS's Rick Turner.

=== Race-based analysis ===
At least for its first half-decade, SASO – like the rest of the Black Consciousness movement – firmly eschewed class analysis in favour of a view of race as the central political divide. In this, as well as in its opposition to multiracialism, SASO stood apart from the African National Congress (ANC), then operating in exile in Zambia. The ANC monitored SASO with interest from the outset, but favoured a Marxist analysis of apartheid. Indeed, portions of the ANC Youth League advocated for closer cooperation with SASO precisely because they believed that the ANC was wrongly foregrounding class (and the socialist revolution) over race (the so-called national revolution). By July 1976, however, the SASO president himself, Diliza Mji, had begun to link apartheid to capitalist exploitation, imperialism, and class interests, reflecting a growing ideological debate within the Black Consciousness movement. The increased preoccupation of some SASO members with socialism was the result of increased exposure to the South African workers' movement, to the ANC (through the ANC underground, Radio Freedom, and other propaganda), and to socialist-leaning liberation movements in Portugal and Mozambique.

== Activities ==
=== Education and media ===
SASO's constitution identified as one of the organisation's aims the imperative to "project at all times the Black Consciousness image culturally, socially and educationally". One of the major platforms for this function – and for the development of Black Consciousness philosophy and doctrine – was SASO's official media organ, the SASO Newsletter. The newsletter was first published in August 1970, with an editorial note outlining its dual informative and educative aims, and ran until 1976. The best known feature in the newsletter was a regular series by Biko, under the nom de plume Frank Talk, entitled "I Write What I Like". Given SASO's position as a students' organisation, it paid particular attention to disrupting the "physical and intellectual isolation" and "indoctrination and intimidation" which Bantu Education imposed on black students. To this end, SASO organised "formation schools" on university campuses, aiming to provide forums in which students could apply Black Consciousness ideals to the consideration and debate of topical issues. SASO also organised educational and political activities at black high schools.

=== Community projects ===
At its first national formation school in December 1969, SASO agreed to a proposal, lodged by Biko, that "fieldwork" or "work among the people" should be one of SASO's "primary occupations". The 1970 SASO General Student's Council established a dedicated central committee on community development, and in 1971 its approach to such initiatives was systematised under the so-called Action Training model (by 1972 refined as the Community Action and Development model). Community outreach was an activity familiar to former UCM and NUSAS members, and within SASO was partly motivated by concern about black people who lived in poverty. But it was also uniquely aligned to the Black Consciousness ideal of black self-affirmation and self-reliance. In addition, it was viewed as a means of educating, mobilising, and winning the trust of black communities. Specific projects pursued were wide-ranging but included "physical projects" (where students repaired schools or built houses during school holidays), as well as literacy campaigns, skills seminars, and volunteering at clinics. In later years, SASO outreach activities were coordinated with those of other Black Consciousness organisations, particularly the BPC and the Black Community Programmes.

=== Protest ===
Viewing Black Consciousness as "an attitude of mind, a way of life" more than as a tool for political activism, SASO was initially ambivalent about the use of public protests and demonstrations. It associated such demonstrations with NUSAS's liberal activism and – according to a motion adopted by the General Student Conference in 1970 – viewed them as "aimed at the white press and public" and as "deficient" because lacking "a strategic and continuous attempt to change the status quo". The same motion recommended that black students should participate only in protests "directed primarily at the Black population".

In the winter of 1972, however, SASO was centrally involved in infamous student protests which shut down several black campuses across the country. The protests broke out with a sit-in by students at Turfloop in May 1972, after Turfloop expelled SASO activist Onkgopotse Tiro for having addressed the annual graduation ceremony with a fiery renunciation of apartheid and Bantu Education. Black students nationwide were galvanised by the heavy-handed response of the university and police, which effectively blockaded and then expelled the occupying students. A SASO regional formation school being held in Alice, near the University of Fort Hare, held an emergency meeting and drafted the so-called Alice Declaration, which called upon "all Black students [to] force the Institutions/Universities to close down by boycotting lectures".

According to historian Julian Brown, the 1972 protests marked a break with SASO's earlier policy and inaugurated a newfound "embrace of public and confrontational forms of protest". Perhaps the most prominent outcome of this change in policy was the rallies which SASO and the BPC co-organised in September 1974 in Durban and at Turfloop. The rallies aimed to demonstrate public support for the Mozambican liberation movement Frelimo, in the wake of the news that Portugal would grant Mozambique its independence the following year. They garnered extensive public attention, were broken up by the South African Police, and were followed by a government crackdown on Black Consciousness leaders and organisations: the same evening, SASO's Durban offices were raided, as were the homes of several leaders, including Biko. Many leaders were arrested "as part of a general round up" of Black Consciousness activists.

== Crackdown and aftermath ==
In the aftermath of the arrests which followed the 1974 pro-Frelimo rallies, the South African government in January 1975 charged the so-called SASO Nine with violations of the Terrorism Act. Following a high-profile trial, all were found guilty of "encouraging and furthering feelings of hostility between the Black and White inhabitants of the Republic" and were sentenced to imprisonment, leaving SASO – and the BPC – effectively "leaderless". Biko's political activity at that point was severely circumscribed by the banning order against him.

State repression, moreover, worsened after the 1976 Soweto Uprising, in which Black Consciousness movements played a leading role. In the crackdown that followed, the government, on 19 October 1977, banned SASO and various other Black Consciousness organisations, making the organisation and any association with it illegal. No clear successor organisation arose, although the Black Consciousness mantle was passed to a new generation of groups, including the Azanian People's Organisation (Azapo). Many of the SASO trialists went on to hold office in Azapo – Cooper and Nefholovhodwe both served as Azapo president, as did SASO activist Mosibudi Mangena. However, other former members of SASO joined Congress-aligned organisations: revived militancy and state repression drove many students into exile to train with the ANC's Umkhonto weSizwe, while, inside South Africa, Congress-aligned organisations began increasingly to dominate community organising (the so-called civics), the trade union movement, and, through the Congress of South African Students, the students' movement.

== Notable members ==
National leaders of SASO included:

- Steve Biko (inaugural president)
- Barney Pityana (former president)
- Rubin Phillip (former vice president)
- Nkosazana Dlamini (former vice president)
- Ben Langa (former secretary-general)
- Abram Tiro (former organiser)
- Mosioua Lekota (former organiser)

== See also ==
- Durban Moment
- Cyril Ramaphosa
- Mamphela Ramphele
- Zanempilo Community Health Care Centre
