= Internal resistance to apartheid =

1949–1994 social movement in South Africa

- Part of Apartheid, the Cold War and the Decolonisation of Africa
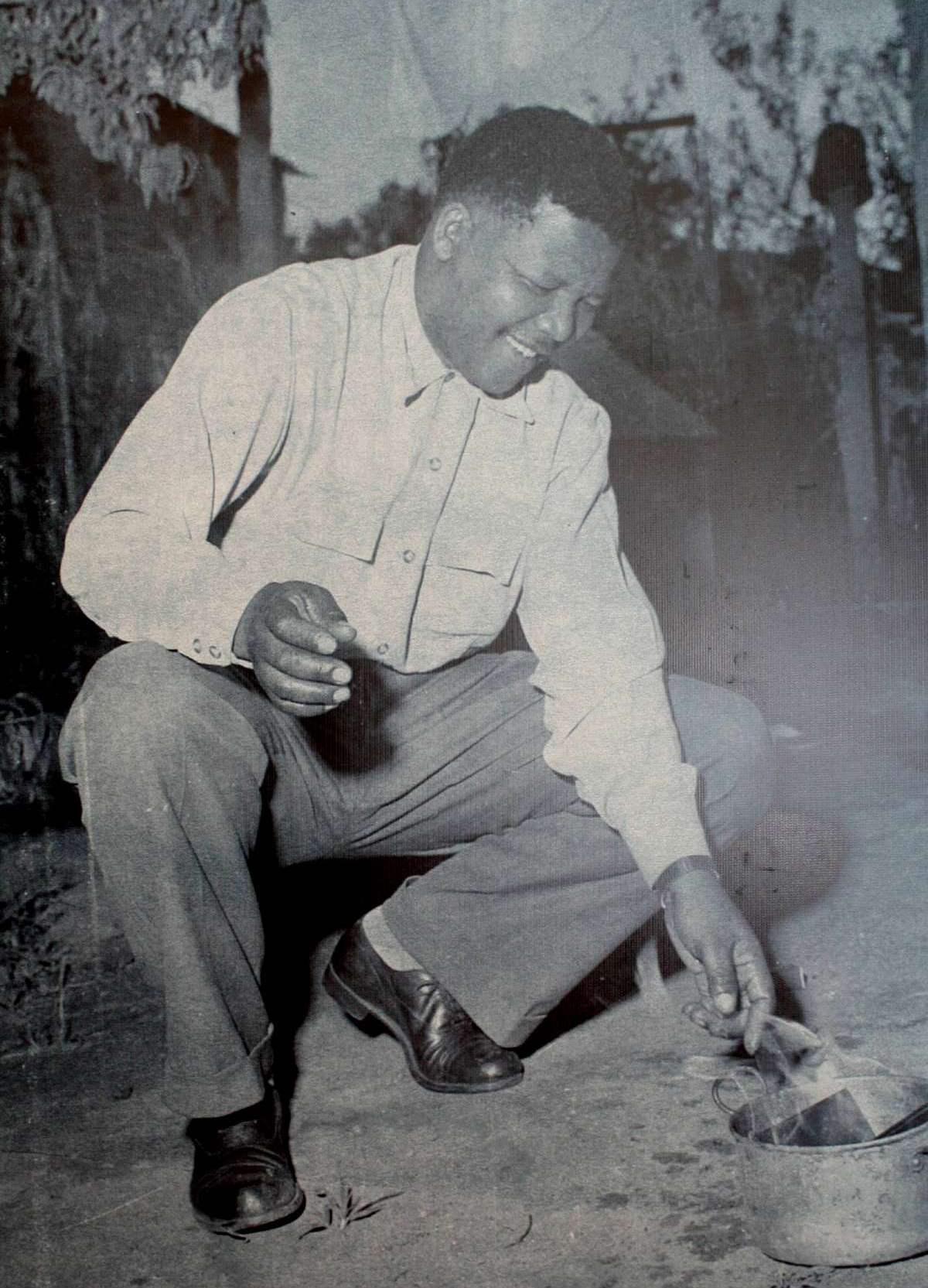
- Nelson Mandela burns his passbook in 1960 as part of a civil disobedience campaign.
Date	4 June 1948 – 10 May 1994 (45 years, 11 months and 6 days) (Note: The ANC made its decision to begin nonviolent resistance and civil disobedience against the apartheid system on 17 December 1950. The first significant organised protests against apartheid did not occur until the Defiance Campaign in 1952.)
Location	South Africa
Result	Military stalemate between MK/APLA/AZAPO and South African security forces; Bilateral negotiations to end apartheid; Repeal of apartheid legislation in 1991; Dissolution of the bantustans in 1994; Non-racial elections under a universal franchise held in 1994
Territorial changes	Integration of the bantustans, change of provincial borders in South Africa.

Belligerents
Union of South Africa (from 1948 to 1961); Republic of South Africa (from 1961 to 1994); AVF; AWB; Bophuthatswana	Armed resistance groups: MK (ANC/SACP); APLA (PAC); PLAN (SWAPO); AZAPO; ARM; Political opposition: PP (to 1975); PRP (from 1975 to 1977); PFP (to 1989); DP (from 1989); IFP; UDF; Torch Commando

Commanders and leaders
(South Africa) D. F. Malan; (South Africa) J. G. Strijdom; (South Africa) H. F. Verwoerd X; (South Africa) B. J. Vorster; (South Africa) P. W. Botha; (South Africa) F. W. de Klerk; Constand Viljoen; Eugène Terre'Blanche	Oliver Tambo; Nelson Mandela (POW); Winnie Mandela; Joe Slovo; Joe Modise; Moses Mabhida; Moses Kotane; Walter Sisulu; Govan Mbeki; Raymond Mhlaba; Lennox Lagu Helen Suzman; Mangosuthu Buthelezi

Casualties and losses
- 21,000 dead as a result of political violence (1948–94) ~200 Black women and >5,000 men arrest (POW)

Several independent sectors of South African society opposed apartheid through various means, including nonviolent resistance, civil disobedience, guerrilla warfare, terrorism, and conventional warfare. Mass action against the ruling National Party (NP) government, coupled with South Africa's growing international isolation and economic sanctions, were instrumental in leading to negotiations to end apartheid, which began formally in 1990 and ended with South Africa's first multiracial elections under a universal franchise in 1994.

Apartheid was adopted as a formal South African government policy by the NP following their victory in the 1948 general election. From the early 1950s, the African National Congress (ANC) initiated its Defiance Campaign of passive resistance. Subsequent civil disobedience protests targeted curfews, pass laws, and "petty apartheid" segregation in public facilities. Some anti-apartheid demonstrations resulted in widespread rioting in Port Elizabeth and East London in 1952, but organised destruction of property was not deliberately employed until 1959. That year, anger over pass laws and environmental regulations perceived as unjust by black farmers resulted in a series of arsons targeting sugarcane plantations. Organisations such as the ANC, the South African Communist Party, and the Pan Africanist Congress (PAC) remained preoccupied with organising student strikes and work boycotts between 1959 and 1960. Following the Sharpeville massacre, some anti-apartheid movements, including the ANC and PAC, began a shift in tactics from civil disobedience to the formation of military wings.

Mass strikes and student demonstrations continued into the 1970s, powered by growing black unemployment, the unpopularity of the South African Border War, and a newly assertive Black Consciousness Movement. The brutal suppression of the 1976 Soweto uprising radicalised a generation of black activists and greatly bolstered the strength of the ANC's guerrilla force, uMkhonto we Sizwe (MK). From 1976 to 1987 MK carried out a series of bomb attacks targeting government facilities, transportation lines, power stations, and other civil infrastructure. South Africa's military often retaliated by raiding ANC safe houses in neighbouring states.

The NP made several attempts to reform the apartheid system, beginning with the Constitutional Referendum of 1983. This introduced the Tricameral Parliament, which allowed for some parliamentary representation of Coloureds and Indians, but continued to deny political rights to black South Africans. The resulting controversy triggered a new wave of anti-apartheid social movements and community groups which articulated their interests through a national front in politics, the United Democratic Front (UDF). Simultaneously, inter-factional rivalry between the ANC, the PAC and the Azanian People's Organisation (AZAPO), a third militant force, escalated into sectarian violence as the three groups fought for influence. The government took the opportunity to declare a state of emergency in 1986 and detain thousands of its political opponents without trial.

Secret bilateral negotiations to end apartheid commenced in 1987 as the National Party reacted to increased external pressure and the atmosphere of political unrest. Leading ANC officials such as Govan Mbeki and Walter Sisulu were released from prison between 1987 and 1989, and in 1990 the ANC and PAC were formally delisted as banned organisations by President F. W. de Klerk, and Nelson Mandela was released from prison. The same year, MK reached a formal ceasefire with the South African Defence Force. Further apartheid laws were abolished on 17 June 1991, and multiparty negotiations proceeded until the first multi-racial general election held in April 1994.

== Background ==
Although its creation predated apartheid, the African National Congress (ANC) became the primary force in opposition to the government after its moderate leadership was superseded by the organisation's more radical Youth League (ANCYL) in 1949. Led by Walter Sisulu, Nelson Mandela and Oliver Tambo, elected to the ANC's National Executive that year, the ANCYL advocated a radical black nationalist programme that combined the Africanist ideas of Anton Lembede with Marxism. They proposed that white authority could only be overthrown through mass campaigns. The ideals of the ANC and ANCYL are stated in the ANC official web site and state, concerning the Tripartite Alliance: "The Alliance is founded on a common commitment to the objectives of the National Democratic Revolution, and the need to unite the largest possible cross-section of South Africans behind these objectives," citing the actionable intent and their goal to end oppression.

When the ANCYL took control of the ANC, the organisation advocated a policy of open defiance and resistance for the first time, which unleashed the 1950s Programme of Action, instituted in 1949, that emphasised the right of the African people to freedom under the flag of African Nationalism. It laid out plans for strikes, boycotts, and civil disobedience, resulting in mass protests, stay-aways, boycotts, strikes and occasional violent clashes. The 1950 May Day stay-away was a strong, successful expression of black grievances.

In 1952, the Joint Planning Council, made up of members from the ANC, the South African Indian Congress and the Coloured People's Congress, agreed on a plan for the defiance of unfair laws. They wrote to Prime Minister D. F. Malan and demanded that he repeal the Pass Laws, the Group Areas Act, the Bantu Administration Act and other legislation, warning that refusal to do so would be met with a campaign of defiance. Malan referred the council to the Native Affairs Department and threatened to treat insolence callously.

The Programme of Action was launched with the Defiance Campaign in June 1952. By defying the laws, the organisation hoped to incite mass arrests that would overwhelm the government. Mandela led a crowd of 50 men down the streets of a white area in Johannesburg after the 11 pm curfew that forbade black people's presence. The group was apprehended, but the rest of the country followed its example. Defiance spread throughout the country and black people disregarded racial laws; For example, they walked through "whites only" entries. At the campaign's zenith in September 1952, more than 2,500 people from 24 different towns were arrested for defying various laws. After five months, the African and Indian Congresses decided to call off the campaign because of the increasing number of riots, strikes and heavier sentences on participants. During the campaign, almost 8,000 black and Indian people had been detained; at the same time, ANC membership grew from 7,000 to 100,000, and the number of subdivisions went from 14 at the campaign's beginning to 87 at its end. There was also a change in leadership: shortly before the campaign ended, Albert Luthuli was elected as the new ANC president.

By the end of the campaign, the government was forced to temporarily relax its apartheid legislation. Once things had calmed down, however, the government responded harshly and took several extreme measures, among which were the Unlawful Organisations Act, the Suppression of Communism Act, the Public Safety Act and the Criminal Procedures Act. Criminal Law Amendment Act No 8 stated that "[any] person who in any way whatsoever advises, encourages, incites, commands, aids or procures any other person ... or uses language calculated to cause any other person to commit an offence by way of protest against the law... shall be guilty of an offence." In December 1952, Mandela, Sisulu and 18 others were tried under the Suppression of Communism Act for leading the Defiance Campaign. They received nine months' imprisonment, which was suspended for two years.

The government also tightened the regulation of separate amenities. Protesters had argued to the courts that different amenities for different races ought to be of an equal standard. The Separate Amenities Act removed the façade of mere separation; it gave the owners of public amenities the right to bar people on the basis of colour or race and made it lawful for different races to be treated inequitably. Sisulu, Mandela, Albert Luthuli, other famous ANC members, Indian Congress, and trade union chiefs' activities were all proscribed under the Suppression of Communism Act. The proscription meant that the headship was restricted to their homes and adjacent areas and they were banned from attending public gatherings.

On the global stage, India demanded that apartheid be challenged by the United Nations, which led to the establishment of a UN commission on apartheid.

Although the movement was subjected to increasing restrictions, it was still able to struggle against the oppressive instruments of the state. Collaboration between the ANC and NIC increased and strengthened through the Defiance Campaign. Support for the ANC and its endeavours increased. On 15 August 1953, at the Cape ANC conference in Cradock, Professor Z. K. Matthews proposed a national convention of the people to study the national problems on an all-inclusive basis and outline a manifesto of amity. In March 1954, the ANC, the South African Indian Congress (SAIC), the Coloured People's Congress, the South African Congress of Democrats (SACOD) and the South African Congress of Trade Unions (SACTU) met and founded the National Action Council for the Congress of the People. Delegates were drawn from each of these establishments and a nationwide organiser was assigned. A campaign was publicised for the drafting of a freedom charter, and asked for 10,000 volunteers to help with the conscription of views across the country and the Congress of the People. Demands were documented and sent to the local board of the National Action Council in preparation for drafting the Charter.

The Congress of the People was held 25–26 June 1955 in Kliptown, south of Johannesburg. 3,000 delegates gathered under police watch to revise and accept the Freedom Charter that had been endorsed by the ANC's National Executive on the eve of the Congress. Among the organisations present were the Indian Congress and the ANC. The Freedom Charter articulated a vision for South Africa that radically differed from the partition policy of apartheid. It:

- emphasised that South Africa should be a just and non-racial society,
- called for a one-person-one-vote democracy within a single unified state,
- stated that all people should be treated equally before the law,
- that land should be "shared among those who work it" and
- that the people should "share in the country's wealth" – a statement often been interpreted as a call for socialist nationalisation.

The congress delegates had consented to almost all the sections of the charter when the police announced that they suspected treason and recorded the names and addresses of all those present.

In 1956, the Federation of South African Women (FEDSAW) was founded and led by Lilian Ngoyi, Helen Joseph and Amina Cachalia. On 9 August that year, the women marched to the Union Buildings in Pretoria and protested against the pass laws. On the morning of 5 December 1956, the police detained 156 Congress Alliance leaders: 104 African, 23 white, 21 Indian and eight Coloured people. They were charged with high treason and plotting a violent overthrow of the state, and replacing it with a communist government. The charge was based on statements and speeches made during the Defiance Campaign and the Congress of the People. The Freedom Charter was used as proof of the Alliance's communist intent and their conspiracy to oust the government. The State greatly relied on the evidence of Professor Arthur Murray, an ostensible authority on communism and socialism. His evidence was that the ANC papers were full of communist and socialist terms like "comrade" and "proletariat", which are often found in the writings of Vladimir Lenin and Joseph Stalin. Halfway through the drawn-out trial, charges against 61 of the accused were withdrawn, and, five years after their arrest, the remaining 30 were acquitted after the court held that the state had failed to prove its case.

=== The Sharpeville Massacre ===
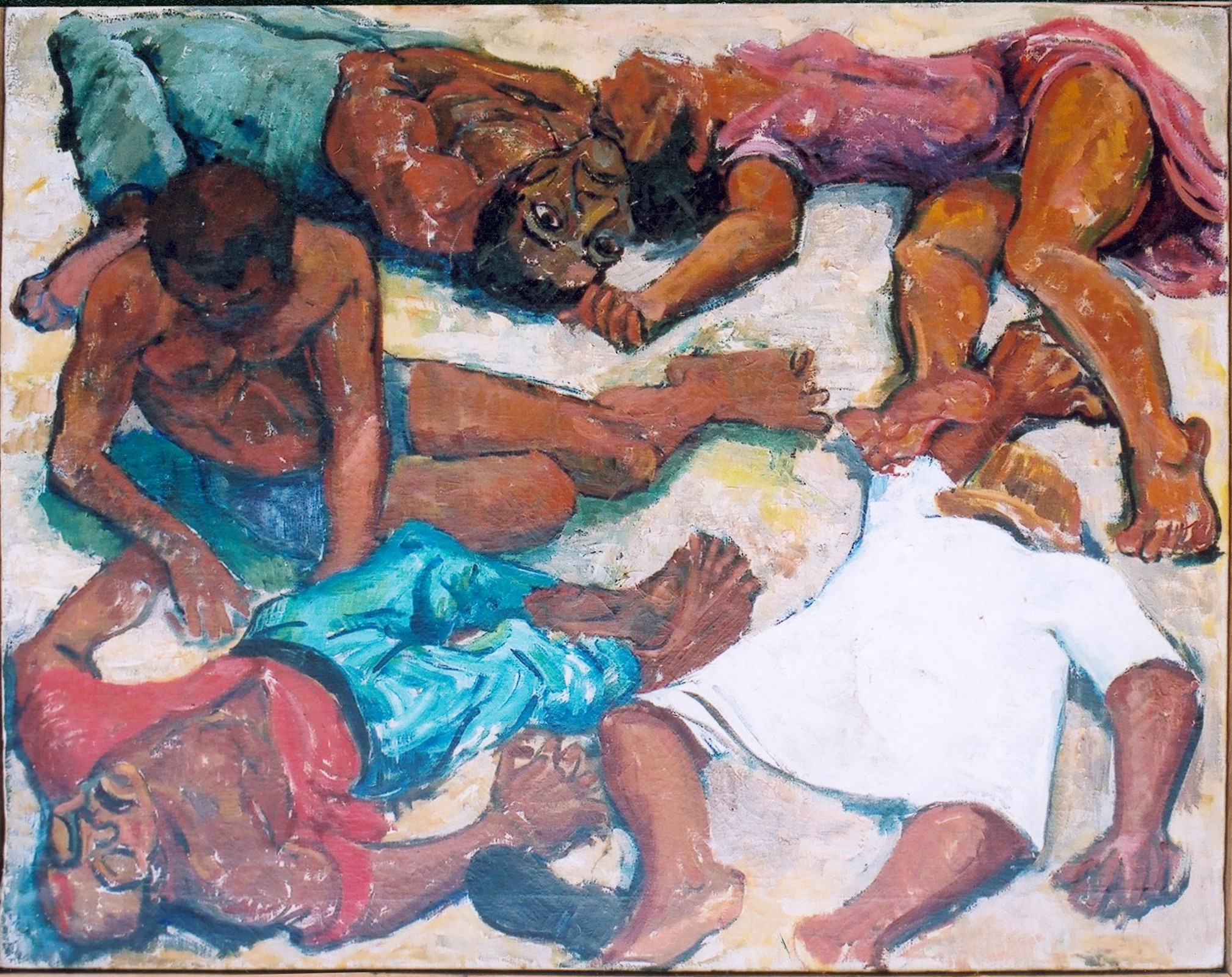
Painting depicting the Sharpeville Massacre

In 1958 a group of disenchanted ANC members broke away from the ANC and formed the Pan Africanist Congress of Azania (PAC) in 1959. First on the PAC's agenda was a series of nationwide demonstrations against the pass laws. The PAC called for blacks to demonstrate against pass books on 21 March 1960. One of the mass demonstrations organised by the PAC took place at Sharpeville, a township near Vereeniging. The size of the crowd was estimated to be 20,000 people. The crowd converged on the Sharpeville police station, singing and offering themselves up for arrest for not carrying their pass books. A group of police officers panicked and opened fire on the demonstrators shortly after the crowd approached the police station, killing 69 people and injuring 186. All the victims were black, and most of them had been shot in the back. Many witnesses stated that the crowd was not violent, but Colonel J. Pienaar, the senior police officer in charge on the day, said: "Hordes of natives surrounded the police station. My car was struck with a stone. If they do these things they must learn their lesson the hard way." The event became known as the Sharpeville massacre. In the aftermath the government banned the African National Congress (ANC) and the PAC.

== Armed resistance and sabotage ==
The Sharpeville Massacre persuaded several anti-apartheid movements that nonviolent civil disobedience alone was ineffective at encouraging the National Party government to seek reform. The resurgent tide of armed revolutions in many developing nations and European colonial territories during the early 1960s gave ANC and PAC leaders the idea that nonviolent civil disobedience should be complemented by acts of insurrection and sabotage. Nelson Mandela and Walter Sisulu were instrumental in persuading the ANC's executive to adopt armed struggle. Mandela first advocated this option during the Defiance Campaign of 1952, but his proposal was rejected by his fellow activists for being too radical. However, with the subsequent success of revolutionary struggles in Cuba, French Indochina, and French Algeria, the ANC executive became increasingly more open to suggestions by Mandela and Sisulu that it was time for armed struggle.

From 1961 to 1963, the ground in South Africa was slowly being readied for armed revolution. A hierarchical network of covert ANC cells was created for underground operations, military aid solicited from sympathetic African states and the Soviet Union, and a guerrilla training camp established in Tanganyika. In June 1961, the uMkhonto we Sizwe (abbreviated as MK) had been set up by the ANC to coordinate underground militant activity throughout South Africa. By the end of 1962 the ANC established an MK high command consisting of Mandela, Sisulu, Govan Mbeki, Raymond Mhlaba, and prominent South African Communist Party (SACP) activist Joe Slovo. Slovo and the SACP were instrumental in bolstering MK and developing its tactics for guerrilla warfare, inciting insurrection and urban sabotage. White SACP members such as Jack Hodgson, who had served in the South African Army during World War II, were instrumental in training MK recruits. The SACP was also able to secure promises of military aid from the Soviet Union for the fledgling guerrilla army, and purchased Liliesleaf Farm in Rivonia, just outside Johannesburg, to serve as MK's headquarters.

Throughout the 1960s, MK was still a relatively small unit of poorly equipped guerrilla fighters incapable of taking significant action against the South African security forces. Success of the MK's strategy depended on its ability to stoke the anger of a politically conscious black underclass and its armed struggle was essentially a strategic attempt at mass socialisation.This reflected the principles of Leninist vanguardism which heavily influenced SACP and ANC political theory to a lesser extent. MK commanders hoped that through their actions, they could appeal to the masses and inspire a popular uprising against the South African regime. A popular uprising would compensate for the MK's weaknesses as it offered a way to defeat the National Party politically without having to engage in a direct military confrontation which the guerrillas would have no hope of winning.

On 16 December 1961, MK operatives bombed a number of public facilities in several major South African cities, namely Johannesburg, Cape Town, Port Elizabeth and Durban. This programme of controlled sabotage was timed to coincide with the Day of the Vow, the anniversary of an important battle between the voortrekkers and the Zulu Kingdom in 1838. Over the next eighteen months, MK carried out 200 acts of sabotage, mostly targeting pass offices, power pylons, and police stations. In October 1962 the ANC publicly declared responsibility for the sabotage campaign and acknowledged the existence of MK.

List of attacks attributed to MK in South Africa between 1980 and 1983.

Mandela began planning for MK members to be given military training outside South Africa and slipped past authorities as he himself moved in and out of the country, earning him the moniker "The Black Pimpernel". Mandela initially avoided arrest within South Africa, but in August 1962, after receiving some inside information, the police put up a roadblock and captured him. MK's success declined with his arrest and the police infiltrated the organisation.

In July 1963, the police found the location of the MK headquarters at Lilliesleaf. They raided the farm and arrested many major leaders of the ANC and MK, including Sisulu, Mbeki and Ahmed Kathrada. They were detained and indicted with sabotage and attempting to bring down the government. At the same time, police collected evidence to be used in the trial that allowed them to arrest others like Denis Goldberg. Particularly damaging was the information on Operation Mayibuye (Operation Comeback), a plan for bringing exiles back into the country. It also revealed that MK was planning to use guerrilla warfare.

The PAC's secretive martial arm was called Poqo, meaning "go it alone". It was prepared to take lives in the quest for liberation: it murdered whites, police informants and black people who supported the government. It sought to arrange a national revolution to conquer the white government, but poor organisation and in-house nuisances crippled the PAC and Poqo.

The PAC did not have adequate direction. Many PAC principals were taken into custody on 21 March 1960, and those released were hampered by bans. When Robert Sobukwe (who was jailed following the Sharpeville massacre) was discharged from Robben Island in 1969, he was placed under house arrest in Kimberley until he died in 1978. Police repeatedly lengthened his incarceration through the "Sobukwe clause", which permitted the state to detain people even after they had served their sentences.

The PAC's management difficulties also existed in exile. When they were outlawed, PAC leaders set up headquarters in places like Dar es Salaam, London and the United States. In 1962, Potlako Leballo left the country for Maseru, Basutoland, and became the PAC's acting president. Soon after he was elected as acting president, he made a public statement that he would launch an attack on South African Police with an army of 150,000 cadres. A few days after that statement, he sent two women PAC couriers, Cynthia Lichaba and Thabisa Lethala, to post letters in Ladybrand, a South African town near Lesotho. The letters contained instructions and details of Poqo cadres. The two women were arrested by Basutoland police and correspondence addressed to poqo cells was confiscated. 3,246 PAC and Poqo members were arrested.

In 1968, PAC was expelled from Maseru (where it was allied with the opposition Basutoland Congress Party) and Zambia (which was friendlier to the ANC). Between 1974 and 1976 Leballo and Ntantala trained the Lesotho Liberation Army (LLA) and the Azanian People's Liberation Army (APLA) in Libya. American pressures split the PAC into a "reformist-diplomatic" group under Sibeko, Make, and Pokela, and a Ghanaian Maoist group led by Leballo. APLA was destroyed by the Tanzanian military at Chunya on 11 March 1980 for refusing to accept the reformist-diplomatic leadership by Make. Leballo was influential in the South African 1985 student risings and pivotal in removing Leabua Jonathan's regime in Lesotho, the stress of which caused his death. The PAC never recovered from the 1980 massacre of Leballo's troops and his death and only won 1.2% of the vote in the 1994 South African election.

The widely publicised Rivonia Trial began in October 1963. Ten men were accused of treason for trying to depose the government and sabotage. Mandela, along with those arrested at Lilliesleaf and another 24 co-conspirators, were tried. Many of them, including Tambo, had already fled the country.

The ANC used the lawsuit to draw international interest to its cause. During the trial, Mandela gave his "I am prepared to die" speech. In June 1964, eight were found guilty of terrorism, sabotage, planning and executing guerrilla warfare and working towards an armed invasion of the country. The treason charge was dropped and all eight were sentenced to life imprisonment. They did not get the death penalty, as it received too much international criticism. Goldberg was sent to the Pretoria Central Prison, and the other seven were imprisoned on Robben Island. Bram Fischer, the defence trial attorney, was also arrested and tried shortly thereafter. The instructions that Mandela gave to make MK an African force were ignored: it continued to be organised and led by the SACP. The trial was condemned by the United Nations Security Council and was a major force in the introduction of international sanctions against the South African government. After Sharpeville the ANC and PAC were banned. The SACP denied it existed, having dissolved in 1950 to escape banning as the CPSA. Leaders like Mandela and Sobukwe were either in jail or in exile. Consequently, there were serious mutinies in Angolan camps by Soweto and Cape student recruits angry at the corrupt and brutal consequences of minority control.

The government was able to dismantle the ANC's power within South Africa's borders by incarcerating leaders of MK and the ANC, and greatly affect its efficiency outside of them. The ANC faced many problems in the aftermath of the Rivonia Trial, as its inner administration was severely damaged. By 1964, the ANC went into hiding and planned guerilla activities from overseas. At the end of the 1960s, new organisations and ideas would form to confront apartheid. The next key act of opposition came in 1976 with the Soweto uprising.

The government's effort at defeating all opposition had been effective. The State of Emergency was de-proclaimed, the economy boomed and the government began implementing apartheid by building the infrastructures of the ten separate Homelands and relocating blacks into these homelands. In 1966, Hendrik Frensch Verwoerd was stabbed to death in parliament, but his policies continued under B.J. Vorster and later P.W. Botha.

Despite these developments, the ANC was able to launch several successful guerrilla attacks against the South African Defense Force from their locations in-hiding. For example, On 20 May 1983, the ANC detonated a car bomb outside the South African Air Force headquarters in Pretoria, killing 19 people and injuring more than 200. The attack was one of the deadliest in the ANC's armed struggle against Apartheid. On 30 January 1981, ANC guerrillas launched a surprise attack on the SADF base in Matola, Mozambique, killing 16 SADF soldiers and wounding more than 40. On 8 December 1982, ANC guerrillas attacked the South African embassy in Maseru, Lesotho, killing three people and injuring several others and on 14 November 1987, the ANC targeted the Vlakplaas police station in Pretoria with a car bomb, killing three police officers and injuring 18 others. Vlakplaas was notorious for its role in the repression of anti-apartheid activists.

== Black Consciousness Movement ==
Prior to the 1960s, the NP government managed to quell much of the anti-apartheid opposition within South Africa by outlawing movements like the ANC and PAC, and driving their leaders into exile or captivity. Tertiary-education organisations such as the University of the North and Zululand University began to resist apartheid; they were fashioned by the Extension of University Education Act of 1959, which guaranteed that black and white students would be taught individually and inequitably.

After the Rivonia Trial and the banning of the ANC and PAC, the struggle within South Africa was significantly suppressed. The age bracket that had seen the Sharpeville massacre became apathetic. A revival in anti-apartheid sentiment came in the late 1960s and mid-1970s from a more radical generation. During this epoch, new anti-apartheid ideas and establishments were created, and they gathered support from across South Africa.

The surfacing of the South African Black Consciousness Movement was influenced by its American equivalent, the American Black Power movement, and directors like Malcolm X. African heads like Kenneth Kaunda suggested ideas of autonomy and Black Pride by means of their anti-colonialist writings. Scholars grew in assurance and became far more candid about the NP's bigoted policies and the repression of the black people.

During the 1970s, resistance grew stronger through trade unions and strikes, and was then spearheaded by the South African Students' Organisation under Steve Biko's leadership. A medical student, Biko was the main force behind the growth of South Africa's Black Consciousness Movement (BCM), which stressed the need for psychological liberation, black pride, and non-violent opposition to apartheid.

The BCM faction was founded by Biko and materialised out of the ideas of the civil rights movement and Black Power movement in the USA. The motto of the movement was "Black is Beautiful", first made popular by boxer Mohammed Ali. BCM endorsed black pride and African customs, and did much to alter feelings of inadequacy while raising awareness of the fallacy of blacks being seen as inferior. It defied practices and merchandise that were meant to make black people "whiter", such as hair straighteners and skin lighteners. Western culture was criticised to be destructive and alien to Africa. Black people became conscious of their own distinctive identity and self-worth and grew more outspoken about their right to freedom.

The National Union of South African Students (NUSAS) was the first organisation to represent students in South Africa, but it had a principally white membership, and black students saw this as an impediment. White students' concerns were more scholastic than political, and although the administration was multiracial, it was not addressing many of the issues of the mounting number of black students since 1960. This resulted in the 1967 creation of the University Christian Movement (UCM), an organisation rooted in African-American philosophy.

In July 1967, the annual NUSAS symposium took place at Rhodes University in Grahamstown. White students were permitted to live on university grounds, but black students were relegated to accommodation further away in a church vestibule, which led to the creation of the South African Students' Organisation (SASO), under Biko, in 1969.

The BCM was an umbrella organisation for groups such as SASO. It was created in 1967, and among its members were the Azanian People's Organisation, the black Community Programme (which directed welfare schemes for blacks), the Black People's Convention (BPC) and the South African Students Movement (SASM), which represented high-school learners. The BPC originally attempted to unite charitable associations like the Education and Cultural Advancement of African People of South Africa before expanding into a political administration with Biko as its honorary president.

When the BCM's principles were revealed, a number of fresh organisations staunch in their endorsement of black liberation were founded. The Azanian People's Organisation was only launched in 1978, a long time after the birth of the Black Consciousness Movement, as a medium for its message.

The BCM drew most of its backing from high schools and tertiary institutions. Black Consciousness ethics were crucial in lifting consciousness amongst black people of their value and right to a better existence, along with the need to insist on these. The BCM's non-violent approach subsided in favour of a more radical element as its resolve to attain liberty was met with state hostility.

After the carnage in Soweto the ANC's Nelson Mandela grudgingly concurred that bloodshed was the only means left to convince the NP to accede to commands for an end to its apartheid policy. A subversive plan of terror was mapped out, with Biko and the BCM at the forefront. The BCM and other opinionated elements were prohibited during the 1970s because the government saw them as dangerous. Black Consciousness in South Africa adopted a drastic theory, much like socialism, as the liberation movement progressed to challenging class divisions and shifting from an ethnic stress to focusing more on non-racialism. The BCM became more worried about the destiny of the black people as workers and believed that "economic and political exploitation has reduced the black people into a class".

With Black Consciousness increasing throughout black communities, a number of other organisations were formed to combat apartheid. In 1972, the Black People's Convention was founded, and the black Allied Worker's Union, formed in 1973, focused on black labour matters. The black community programmes gave attention to the more global issues of black communities. School learners began to confront the Bantu education policy, which was designed to prepare them to be second-class citizens. They created the South African Student's Movement (SASM). It was particularly popular in Soweto, where the 1976 insurrection against Bantu Education would prove to be a crossroads in the fight against apartheid.

Biko was taken into custody on 18 August 1977 and brutally tortured by unidentified security personnel until he lapsed into a coma. He was not medically treated for three days and died in Pretoria. At the subsequent inquest, the magistrate ruled that no-one was culpable, but the South African Medical Association eventually took action against the doctors who had failed to treat Biko.

There was a strong reaction both within and outside South Africa. Foreign countries imposed even more stringent sanctions, and the United Nations imposed an arms embargo. Young blacks inside South Africa committed themselves even more fervently to the struggle against apartheid, under the catchphrase "Liberation before education". Black communities became highly politicised.

The Black Consciousness Movement began to change its focus during the 1980s from issues of nation and community to issues of class; as a result, they may have made of an impact than in the mid-1970s, though there is some evidence to suggest that it retained at least some influence, particularly in workers' organisations.

The role of Black Consciousness could be clearly seen in the approach of the National Forum, which believed that the struggle should hold little or no place for whites. The ideal of blacks leading the resistance campaign was an important aim of the traditional Black Consciousness groups, and it shaped the thinking of many 1980s activists, especially those in the workforce. Furthermore, the NF focused on workers' issues, which became more and more important to BC supporters.

The Azanian People's Organisation was the leading Black Consciousness group of the 1980s. Most of its support came from young black men and women—many of whom were educated at colleges and universities. The organisation received a lot of support in Soweto and also amongst journalists, who helped to popularise its views. It also focused on workers' issues, but refused to form any ties with whites.

Although it did not achieve quite the same level of support that it had in the late 1970s, Black Consciousness still influenced the thinking of a few resistance groups.

== Soweto uprising ==
In 1974 the Afrikaans Medium Decree forced all black schools to use Afrikaans and English in a 50–50 mix as languages of instruction. The intention was to forcibly promote the use of Afrikaans among black Africans. The Afrikaner-dominated government used the clause of the 1909 Constitution that recognised only English and Afrikaans as official languages as a pretext.

The decree was resented deeply by blacks as Afrikaans was widely viewed, in the words of Desmond Tutu and Dean of Johannesburg, as "the language of the oppressor". Teacher organisations such as the African Teachers' Association of South Africa objected to the decree.

The resentment grew until 30 April 1976, when children at Orlando West Junior School in Soweto went on strike and refused to go to school. Their rebellion spread to many other schools in Soweto. Students formed an Action Committee (later known as the Soweto Students' Representative Council) and organised a mass rally for 16 June 1976. The protest was intended to be peaceful.

Stones were thrown in a confrontation with police, who had barricaded the road along the intended route. Attempts to disperse the crowd with dogs and tear gas failed; pandemonium broke out when the police fired shots into the crowd after they were surrounded by the students.

23 people were killed on the first day of rioting. The following day 1,500 heavily armed police officers were deployed to Soweto. Crowd control methods used by South African police were primarily dispersal techniques. Many of the officers shot indiscriminately and killed 176 people.

== Student organisations ==
Student organisations played a significant role in the Soweto uprisings, and after 1976 protests by school children became frequent. There were two major urban school boycotts in 1980 and 1983 that continued for months. Both involved black, Indian and coloured children. There were also extended protests in rural areas in 1985 and 1986. In all of these areas, schools were closed and thousands of students, teachers and parents were arrested.

=== South African Students Movement ===
Students from Soweto high schools Orlando West and Diepkloof created the African Students Movement in 1970, which spread to the Eastern Cape and Transvaal, encouraging other high schools. In March 1972, the South African Students Movement (SASM) was instituted.

SASM supported its members with school work, exams and progress from lower school levels to university. Security forces continuously harassed its members until some of its leaders fled the country in 1973. In 1974 and 1975, some affiliates were captured and tried under the Suppression of Communism and Terrorism Acts, which hindered the SASM's progress. Many headmasters and headmistresses forbade the organisation from becoming involved in their schools.

When the Southern Transvaal local Bantu Education Department concluded that all junior secondary black students had to be taught in Afrikaans in 1974, SASM groups at Naledi High School and Orlando West Secondary Schools vented their grievances on school books and refused to attend their schools. This form of protest spread quickly to other schools in Soweto and peaked around 8 June 1976. When law enforcement officers attempted to arrest a regional SASM secretary, they were stoned and had their cars torched.

On 13 June 1976, nearly 400 SASM associates gathered to start a movement for mass action. An Action Committee was created with two agents from each school in Soweto. The committee became known as the Soweto Students' Representatives Council (SSRC). The protest was scheduled for 16 June 1976 and the organisers were determined to only use aggression if they were assaulted by the police.

=== National Union of South African Students ===
After the Sharpeville Massacre, some black student organisations were founded but short-lived under state proscription and antagonism from university staff. They were also unsuccessful in cooperating effectively with one another.

By 1963, one of the few envoys for tertiary students was the National Union of South African Students (NUSAS). Although the organisation was meant to be non-racial and anti-government, it was primarily made up of white English students from customarily broad-minded universities such as those in Natal, Cape Town, the Witwatersrand and Grahamstown. These students sympathised the effort against the state. By 1967, however, NUSAS was prohibited from functioning on black universities, which made it almost impossible for black Student Representative Councils to join the union.

=== South African Students' Organisation ===
Growing displeasure among black students and the expansion of Black Consciousness led to the incarnation of the South African Students' Organisation (SASO) at Turfloop. In July 1969, Steve Biko became the organisation's inaugural head, which boosted the mood of the students and the Black Consciousness Movement. Under the unified configuration of SASO, the principles of Black Consciousness came to the forefront as a fresh incentive for the strugglers.

=== Congress of South African Students ===
The Congress of South African Students (COSAS) was aimed at co-ordinating the education struggle and organised strikes, boycotts and mass protests around community issues. After 1976 it made a number of demands from the Department of Education and Training (DET), including the scrapping of matric examination fees. COSAS barred many DET officials from entering schools, demanded that all students pass their exams—"pass one, pass all"—and disrupted exams.

=== National Education Crisis Committee ===
In 1986, the National Education Crisis Committee (NECC) was created from parents, teachers and students after the school boycotts. It encouraged students to return to their studies and protest in less disruptive ways to their education. Consumer boycotts were recommended instead and teachers and students were encouraged to work together to develop an alternative education system.

== Trade union movement ==
After apartheid began, South Africa economically flourished due to its newly found trade relations. Products such as gold and coal were being traded along the nation's coastal lines to western countries. The products were mined by black labour workers, who were split up by Bantustan law, which designated different black South African tribes to work in give areas. It was a strategic move that allowed the white people to easily direct labour.

In 1973, labour action in South Africa was renewed as a result of the numerous strikes in Durban. Abuse of black workers was common, and many black people were consequently paid less than a living wage. In January, 2,000 workers of the Coronation Brick and Tile Company went on strike for a pay raise (from under R10 to R20 a week), incorporating Mahatma Gandhi's views of civil resistance into their rebellions. The strike drew a lot attention and encouraged other workers to strike. Strikes for higher wages, improved working conditions and the end of exploitation occurred throughout this period. Other industrial and municipal workers were inspired by the brick and tile workers and also walked off their jobs. A month later, 30,000 black labour workers were on strike in Durban. The entire apartheid system, relied on black labour workers to keep its economy growing, thus the strikes strategically disrupted the system of power. Not only did these strikes distort the nation's economy, they also inspired students to strike on their own. The Durban labour strikes were a foundation for rebellions such as the Soweto Uprising.

Police employed tear gas and violence against the strikers, but could not apprehend the masses of people involved. The strikers never chose individuals to stand for them because they would be the first to be detained. Blacks were not permitted trade unions, which meant that the government could not act against any particular individuals. Strikes usually concluded when income boosts were tendered, but these were generally lower than what had been insisted upon.

The influence of the Durban strikes extended to other parts of the country. In 1973 and 1974 opposition to labour expanded to the entire country. There was also a growing resilience among black workers as they found that the state did not retort as harshly as they had expected. They began to form trade unions despite being illegitimate and unofficial.

After 1976, trade unions and their workers began to play a massive role in the fight against apartheid. With their thousands of members, the trade unions had great strength in numbers, which they used to their advantage to campaign for the rights of black workers and to force the government to make changes to its apartheid policies. Trade unions filled the gap left by banned political parties; they assumed tremendous importance because they could act on a wide variety of issues and problems for their people beyond those that were work-related, as links between work issues and broader community grievances became more palpable.

Fewer trade-union officials (harassed less by the police and army) were jailed than political leaders in the townships. Union members could meet and make plans within the factory. In this way, trade unions played a pivotal role in the struggle against apartheid, and their efforts generally had wide community support.

In 1979, one year after P. W. Botha's accession to power, black trade unions were legalised and their role in the resistance struggle grew to all-new proportions. Before 1979, black trade unions had had no legal clout in dealings with employers. All strikes that took place were illegal, but they did help to establish the trade unions and their collective cause. Although the legalisation of black trade unions gave workers the legal right to strike, it also gave the government a degree of control over them, as they had to be registered and hand in their membership records to the government. They were not allowed to support political parties either, though some trade unions did not comply.

Later in 1979, the Federation of South African Trade Unions (FOSATU) was formed as the first genuinely national and non-racial trade union federation in South Africa. It was followed by the Council of Unions of South Africa (CUSA), which was influenced strongly by the ideas of Black Consciousness and wanted to work to ensure black leadership of unions.

The establishment of the trade union federations led to greater unity amongst the workers. The tremendous size of the federations gave them increased voice and power. In 1980 many black high-school and university students boycotted their schools and there was a country-wide protest over wages, rents and bus fares. In 1982, there were 394 strikes involving 141,571 workers. FOSATU and CUSA grew from 70,000 members in 1979 to 320,000 by 1983, which is also the year that the National Forum and the UDF were established.

The largest and longest black uprising exploded in the Vaal Triangle in 1984 when the new constitution was established. COSAS and FOSATU organised the longest stay-away in South African history, and there were 469 strikes that year, amounting to 378,000 hours in lost business time.

In accordance with the State of Emergency in 1985, COSAS was banned and many UDF leaders were arrested. A meeting in Zambia between leaders of white businesses and the ANC influenced the formation of COSATU in 1985. The newly formed trade-union governing body, committed to improved working conditions and the fight against apartheid, organised a nationwide strike the following year, and a new State of Emergency was declared. COSATU's membership quickly grew to 500,000.

With South Africa facing an unprecedented shortage of skilled white labour, the government was forced to allow black people to fill the vacancies. This, in turn, led to an increase in spending on black, Coloured and Indian education.

There were still divides amongst the trade-union faction, which had the membership of only ten per cent of the country's workforce. Not all trade unions joined the federations, while agricultural and domestic workers did not have a trade union to join and were thus more liable. Nevertheless, by the end of this period, the unions emerged as one of the most effective vehicles for black opposition.

== Churches ==
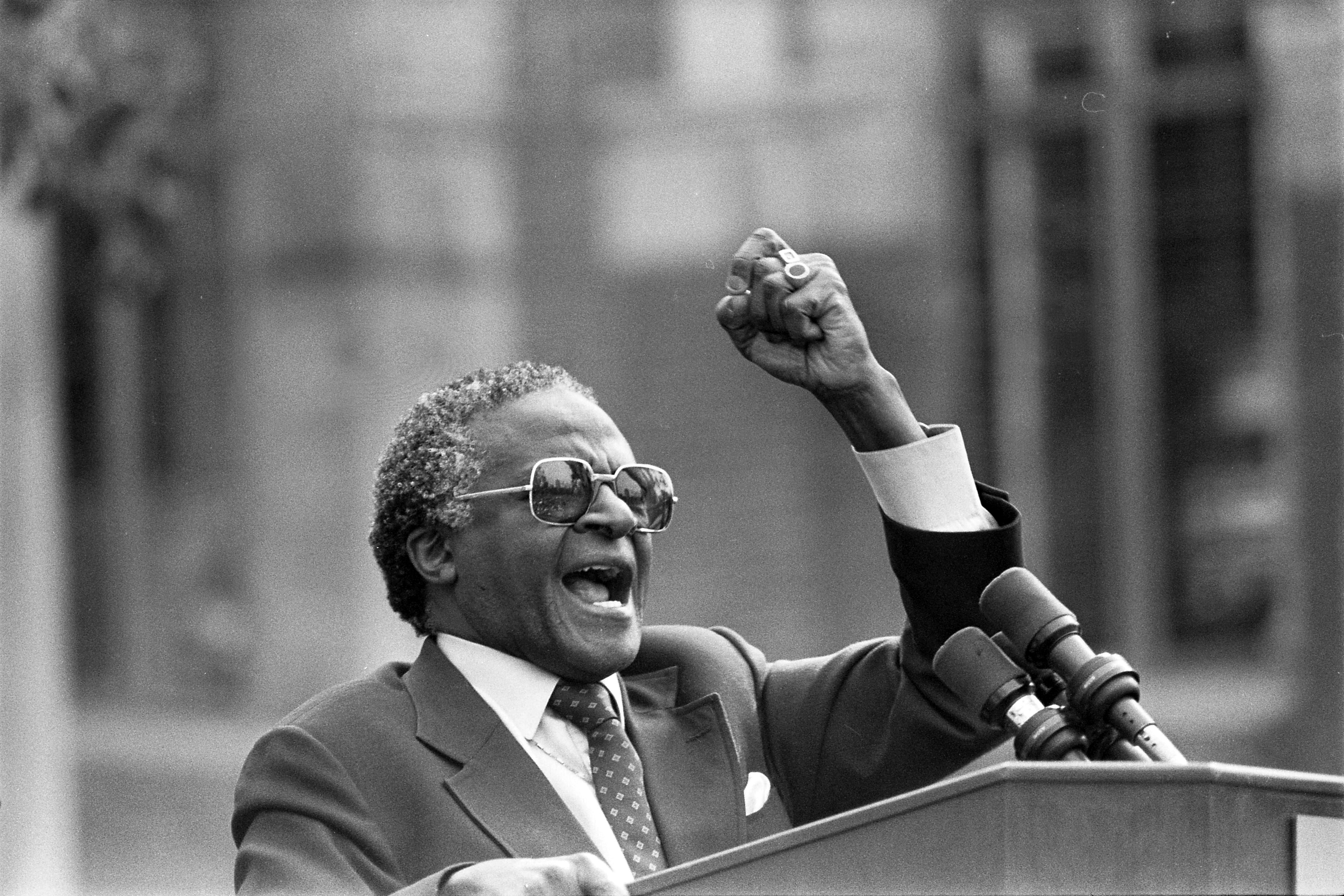
Desmond Tutu makes a speech in Los Angeles, 1986

The government's suppression of anti-apartheid political parties limited their influence but not church activism. The government was far less likely to attack or arrest religious leaders, allowing them to potentially be more politically active in the resistance, though the government took action against some churches.

Beyers Naudé left the pro-apartheid Dutch Reformed Church and founded the Christian Institute of Southern Africa with other theologians, including Albert Geyser, Ben Marais and John de Gruchy. Naudé and the Institute were banned in 1977, but he later became the general secretary of the South African Council of Churches (SACC), a religious association that supported anti-apartheid activities. It also notably refused to condemn violence as a means of ending apartheid.

Frank Chikane was another general secretary of the SACC. He was detained four times because of his criticism of the government and once allegedly had an attempt on his life initiated by Adriaan Vlok, former Minister of Law and Order.

Archbishop Desmond Tutu was another general secretary of the SACC. He was awarded the Nobel Peace Prize for his efforts in 1984 and used his position and popularity to denounce the government and its policies. On 29 February 1988 Tutu and some other church leaders were arrested during a protest in front of the parliamentary buildings in Cape Town.

Alan Boesak led the World Alliance of Reformed Churches (WARC). He influenced the founding the UDF and was once jailed for a month after organising a march demanding the release of Nelson Mandela.

Although church leaders were not completely immune to prosecution, they were able to criticise the government more freely than the leaders of militant groups. They were pivotal in altering public opinion regarding apartheid policies.

A 1977 New York Times article reported that the Catholic Church in South Africa had caught up and surpassed Protestant Churches by authorizing the admission of black students to previously all-white schools. This was done in disregard of South African law which required segregation. Protestant churches such as the Anglicans had generally followed a conciliatory approach to attempt to gain prior government approval. The Catholics also announced they were laying the groundwork to extend their approach to hospitals, homes and orphanages. In contrast, the Dutch Reformed Church continued to offer biblical justifications for segregation in 1977, although some reformers within the denomination challenged those rationales.

== Mass Democratic Movements ==
The Mass Democratic Movement played a brief but very important role in the resistance. It was formed in 1989 as an alliance between the UDF and COSATU, and organised a campaign that aimed to end segregation in hospitals, schools and beaches. The campaign was successful and managed to bring segregation to an end. Some historians, however, argue that this occurred because the government had planned to end segregation anyway and did not, therefore, feel at all threatened by the MDM's actions.

Later in 1989, the MDM organised a number of peaceful marches against the State of Emergency (extended to four years now) in the major cities. Even though these marches were illegal, no-one was arrested—evidence that apartheid was coming to an end and that the government's hold was weakening.

The MDM emerged very late into the resistance, but it added to the effective resistance that the government faced. It organised a series of protests and further united the opposition movement. It was characteristic of the "mass resistance" that characterised the 1980s: many organisations united and dealt with different aspects of the fight against apartheid and its implications.

== White resistance ==
While the majority of white South African voters supported the apartheid system for the first few decades, a minority fervently opposed it. Although assassination attempts against government members were rare, Prime Minister Hendrik Verwoerd, called the "architect of grand apartheid", had two attempts made on his life (the second of which was successful) by David Pratt and Dimitri Tsafendas, both legally considered white (although Tsafendas had a mother from Portuguese East Africa). The moderate United Party of Jan Smuts (the official opposition in 1948–1977) initially opposed the Nationalists' apartheid program and favoured the dismantling of racial segregation by the Fagan Commission, but eventually reverted its policy and even criticised the National Party for "handing out" too much South African land to the Bantustans. In parliamentary elections during the 1970s and 1980s between 15% and 20% of white voters voted for the liberal Progressive Party.

Helen Zille, a white anti-apartheid activist, exposed a police cover-up regarding the death of Black Consciousness founder Steve Biko as a reporter for the Rand Daily Mail. Zille was active in the Black Sash, an organisation of white women formed in 1955 to oppose the removal of Coloured (mixed-race) voters from the Cape Province voters' roll. Although they failed, the organisation continued to assist blacks with issues such as pass laws, housing and unemployment.

Covert resistance was expressed by banned organisations like the largely white South African Communist Party, whose leader Joe Slovo was also Chief of Staff of the ANC's armed wing, Umkhonto we Sizwe. Whites also played a significant role in opposing apartheid during the 1980s through the United Democratic Front and End Conscription Campaign. The latter was formed in 1983 to oppose the conscription of white males into the South African military. The ECC's support base was not particularly large, but the government still banned it in 1988.

The army played a major role in the government's maintenance of its apartheid policies. It expanded considerably to fight the resistance, and more money was spent on increasing its effectiveness. It is estimated that between 4 billion and 5 billion rand was spent on defence in the mid-1980s. Conscription was used to increase the size of the army, with stiff prison sentences imposed for draft evasion or desertion. Only white males were conscripted, but volunteers from other races were also drawn in. The army was used to fight battles on South African borders and in neighbouring states, against the liberation movements and the countries that supported them. During the 1980s, the military was also used to suppress township uprisings, which saw support for the ECC increase markedly.

Literary opposition to apartheid came from internationally known figures in South African literature like Roy Campbell and Alan Paton, and in Afrikaans literature by Uys Krige, Ingrid Jonker, Breyten Breytenbach, André Brink and from Afrikaner Calvinist dominies like Beyers Naudé.

Some of the first violent incidents of resistance to the system was organised by the African Resistance Movement (ARM), which was founded in the 1960s and were responsible for setting off bombs at power stations (for example, the Park Station bomb). The membership of this group was almost completely recruited from the marginalised white intellectual scene. Many of ARM's members had been part of the National Union of South African Students (NUSAS). Unlike pro-peace opposition NUSAS, ARM was a radical organisation. Its backing came mostly from Johannesburg, Port Elizabeth and Cape Town. By 1964, ARM ceased to exist, as most of its members having been arrested or fled the country.

On 24 July 1964, Frederick John Harris, an associate of ARM, planted a time bomb in the Johannesburg station. One person was killed and 22 were injured. Harris explained that he had wanted to show that ARM still existed, but both ARM and the ANC slammed his actions. He was sentenced to death and executed in 1965.

== Jewish resistance ==
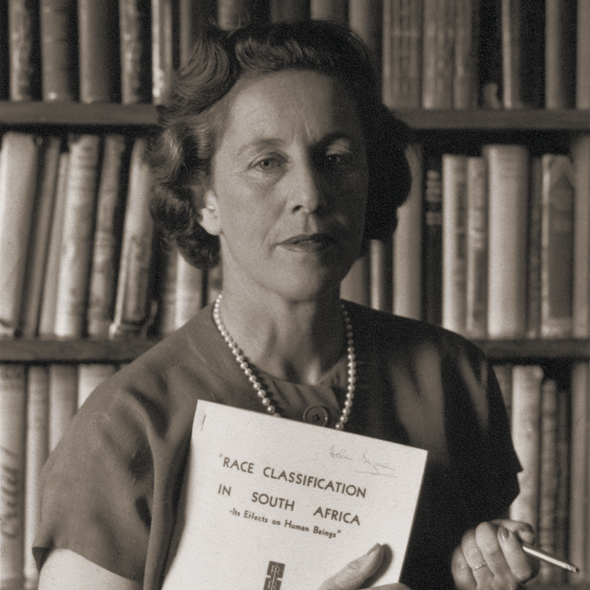
Helen Suzman

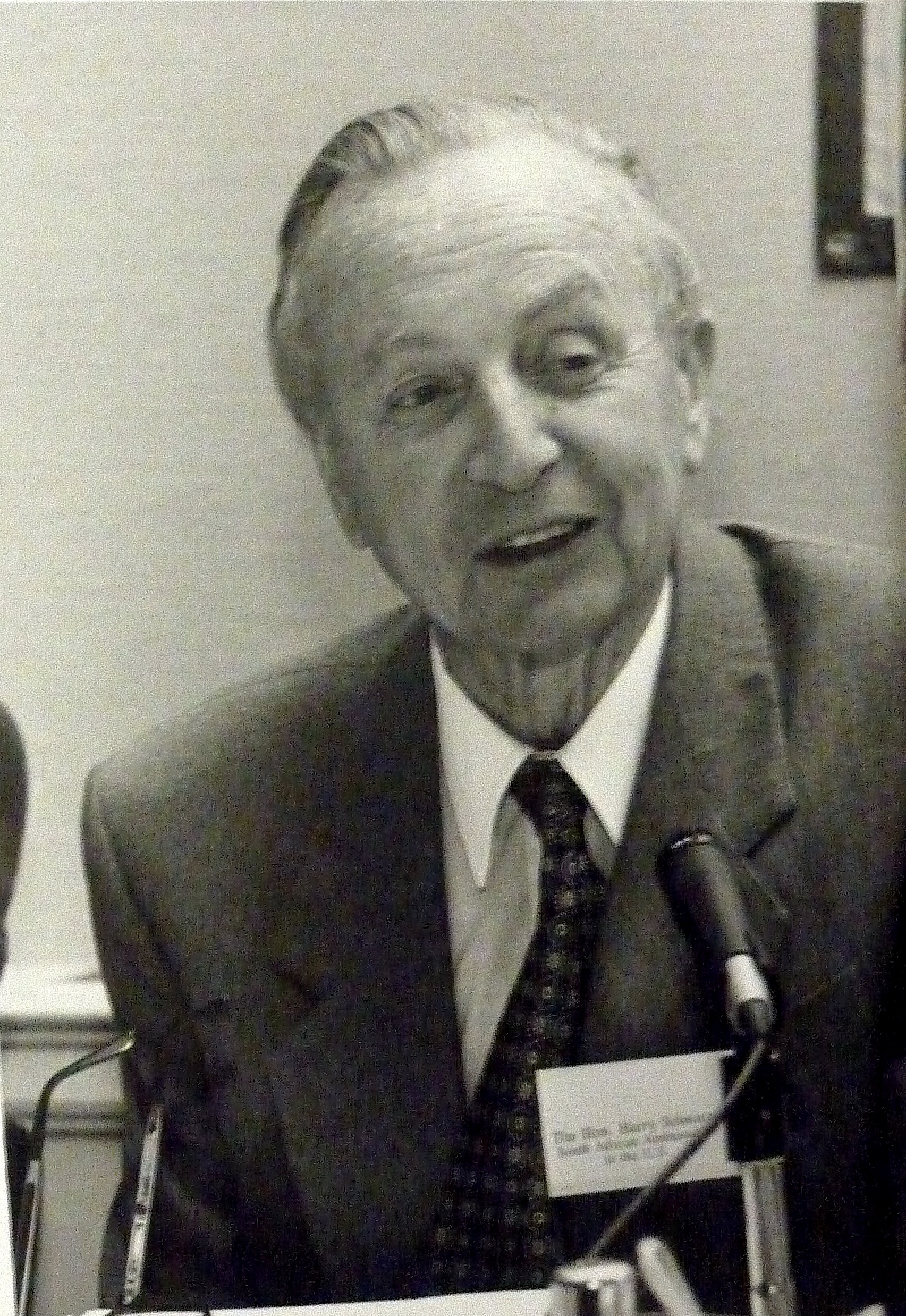
Harry Schwarz

Helen Suzman and Harry Schwarz, who were prominent anti-apartheid campaigners during the 1960s, 1970s and 1980s

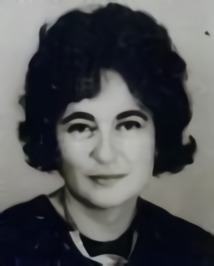
Anti-apartheid activist Ruth First, assassinated by police in 1982

Many Jewish South Africans, both individuals and organisations, helped support the anti-apartheid movement. It was estimated that Jews were disproportionately represented (some sources maintain by as much as 2,500%) among whites involved in anti-apartheid political activities. Much like other English-speaking white South Africans, Jews supported either the Progressive Party or the United Party. One organisation, the Union of Jewish Women, sought to alleviate the suffering of blacks through charitable projects and self-help schemes. Fourteen of the 23 whites involved in the 1956 Treason Trial were Jewish and all five whites of the 17 members of the African National Congress who were arrested for anti-apartheid activities in 1963 were Jewish.

Some Jewish university students vehemently opposed the apartheid movement. A large number of Jews were also involved in organisations such as the Springbok Legion, the Torch Commando and the Black Sash. These anti-apartheid organisations led protests that were both active (e.g. marching through the streets with torches) and passive (e.g. standing silently in black). Two Jewish organisations were formed in 1985: Jews for Justice (in Cape Town) and Jews for Social Justice (in Johannesburg). They tried to reform South African society and build bridges between the white and black communities. The South African Jewish Board also passed a resolution rejecting apartheid in 1985.

In addition to the well-known high-profile Jewish anti-apartheid personalities, there were very many ordinary Jews who expressed their revulsion of apartheid in diverse ways and contributed to its eventual downfall. Many Jews actively provided humanitarian assistance for black communities. Johannesburg's Oxford Synagogue and Cape Town's Temple Israel established nurseries, medical clinics and adult education programs in the townships and provided legal aid for victims of apartheid laws. Many Jewish lawyers acted as nominees for non-whites who were not allowed to buy properties in white areas.

Helen Suzman—the main champion of the liberal Progressive Party—was the only MP consistently voting against apartheid legislation for many years. Suzman's critics argue that she did not achieve any notable political successes, but helped to shore up claims by the Nationalists that internal, public criticism of apartheid was permitted. Suzman's supporters point to her use of her parliamentary privileges to help the poorest and most disempowered South Africans in any way she could.

Harry Schwarz was in minority opposition politics for over 40 years and was one of the most prominent opponents of the National Party and its policy of apartheid. After assisting in the 1948 general election, Schwarz, Uys Krige, Sailor Malan, and others formed the Torch Commando, an ex-soldiers' movement to protest against the disenfranchisement of the coloured people in South Africa. From the 1960s, when he was Leader of the Opposition in the Transvaal, he became well-known and achieved prominence as a race relations and economic reformist in the United Party. As an early and powerful advocate of non-violent resistance, he signed the Mahlabatini Declaration of Faith with Mangosuthu Buthelezi in 1974, which enshrined the principles of peaceful negotiated transition of power and equality for all. It was the first of such agreements by black and white political leaders in South Africa. In 1975 he led a breakaway from the United Party due to its ineffective approach to criticism of apartheid, and became leader of the new Reform Party that led to the realignment of opposition politics in South Africa. Schwarz was one of the defence attorneys in the Rivonia Trial who defended Jimmy Kantor, Nelson Mandela's lawyer until he was also arrested and charged. Through the 1970s and 1980s Schwarz was amongst the most forthright and effective campaigners against apartheid in Parliament who was feared by many National Party ministers.

In 1980, South Africa's National Congress of the Jewish Board of Deputies passed a resolution urging "all concerned [people] and, in particular, members of our community to cooperate in securing the immediate amelioration and ultimate removal of all unjust discriminatory laws and practices based on race, creed, or colour". This inspired some Jews to intensify their anti-apartheid activism, but the bulk of the community either emigrated or avoided public conflict with the National Party government.

== Indian resistance ==
Hilda Kuper, writing in 1960, observed of the Natal Indian Congress:

Congress considers that in South Africa the first objective is the removal of discrimination based on race, and is prepared to co-operate with people of all groups who share this ideological outlook.

— Hilda Kuper, Indian People in Natal. Natal: University Press. 1960. p. 53. Archived from the original on 22 October 2016.

Fatima Meer and Marimuthu Pragalathan Naicker were notable among Indian South African anti-apartheid activists.

== Role of women ==
South African women participated in the anti-apartheid and liberation movements that took hold of South Africa. Although these female activists were rarely at the head of the main organisations, at least at the beginning of the movement, they were prime actors. One of the earliest organisations was The Bantu Women's League founded in 1913. In the 1930s and 1940s, female activists were prevalent in trade union movements, which also served as a vehicle for future organisation. In the 1950s, women-exclusive organisations were created such as the ANC Women's League (ANCWL) and the Women's Council within the South West Africa People's Organization (SWAPO). In April 1954, the more global Federation of South African Women (FSAW or FedSAW) was founded with the objectives to fight against racism and oppression of women and to make African women understand that they had rights both as human beings and as women. While female activists fought along men and participated to demonstrations and guerrilla movements, FSAW and ANCWL also acted independently and organised bus boycotts and campaigns against restrictive passes in Pretoria and Sharpeville. 20,000 women attended the demonstrations. Many participants were arrested, forced into exile or imprisoned, such as Lilian Ngoyi. In 1958, 2000 women were arrested during an anti-pass campaign. After the Sharpeville massacre, many organisations such as FSAW were banned and went into hiding.

At the same time, South African women fought against gender discrimination and called for rights specific to women, such as family, children, gender equality and access to education. At a conference in Johannesburg in 1954, the Federation of South African Women adopted the "Women's Charter", which focused on rights specific to women both as women and mothers. The Charter referred both to human rights and women's rights and asked for universal equality and national liberation. In 1955, in a document drafted in preparation for the Congress of People, the FSAW made more demands, including free education for children, proper housing facilities and good working conditions, such as the abolition of child labour and a minimum wage.

Their actions and demands gradually attracted the attention of the United Nations and put pressure on the international community. In 1954, Ngoyi attended the World Congress of Women in Lausanne, Switzerland. The ANC was present at the 1975 United Nations Decade for Women in Copenhagen and in 1980 an essay on the role of women in the liberation movement was prepared for the United Nations World Conference, which was crucial for the recognition of Southern African women and their role in the anti-apartheid movement.

Among important activists during the anti-apartheid movement were Ida Mntwana, Nokukhanya Bhengu, Helen Joseph, Elizabeth Komikie Gumede, and Dorothy Nyembe. Ngoyi joined the ANC National Executive and was elected first vice-president and later president of FSAW in 1959. Many of these leaders served long prison sentences.

== See also ==
- List of massacres in South Africa
- Protests in South Africa
- South African Musicians' Alliance
