= Peter Ralph Randall =

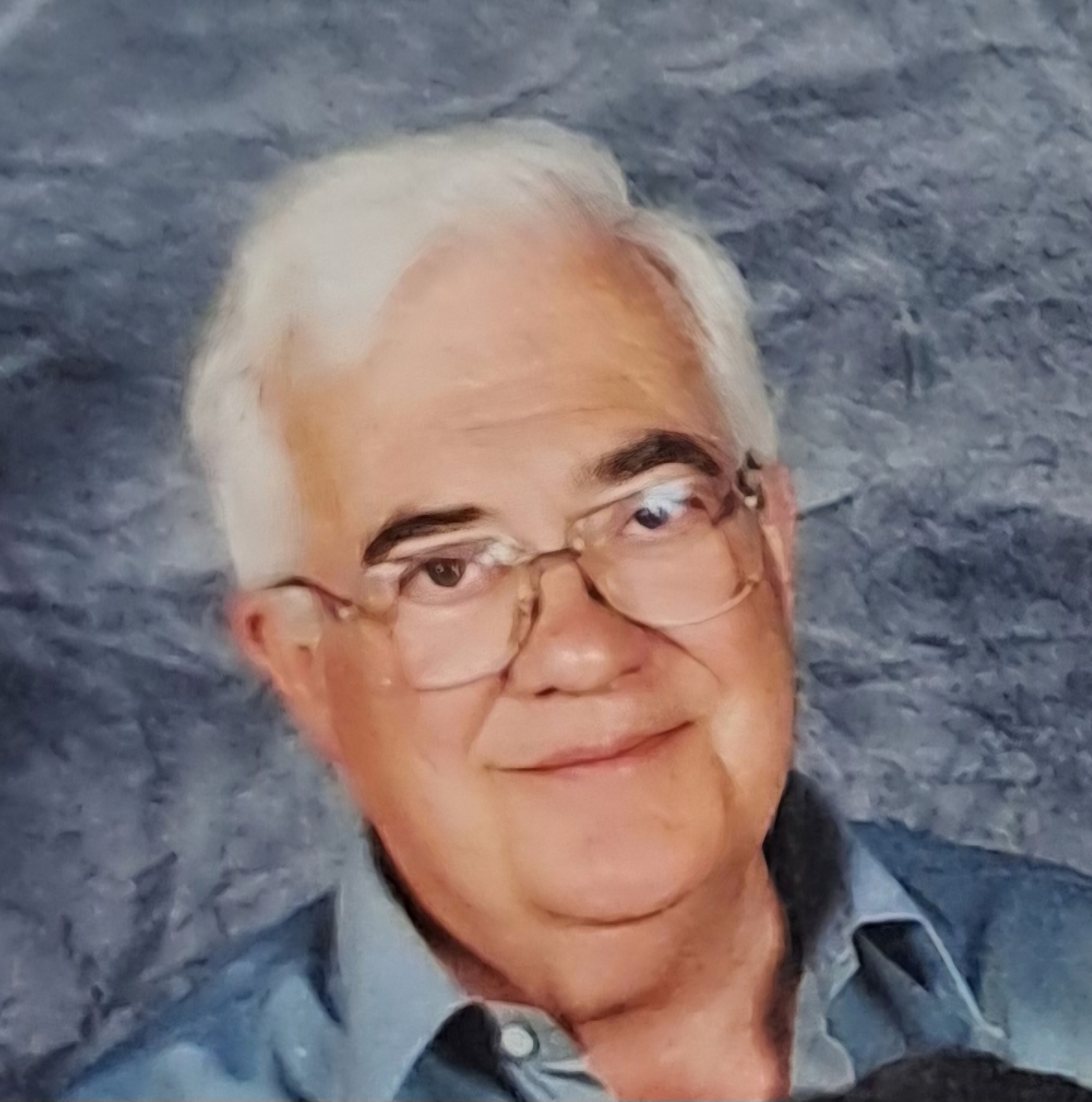
Prof Peter Randall in 2004 (source: Randall family archives)

Peter Ralph Randall (1935 – 5 June 2024) was an anti-apartheid publisher in South Africa, who was banned by the former South African government between 1977 and 1981. He later became a professor in charge of teacher education at the University of the Witwatersrand, Johannesburg.

== Early history ==
Peter Randall was born in Durban in 1935, the youngest of four sons. His father, Walter Kenneth Randall, worked as a journalist and court reporter for the Natal Mercury newspaper, and his mother, Elizabetha Margaretha Randall (née Powrie), was a specialist nursing sister. Randall was educated at the Open Air School, the Durban Preparatory High School, and Kearsney College, and after matriculating he trained at Natal Teachers' Training College (NTC) in Pietermaritzburg. He also completed a BA in English and history through the University of South Africa. He was the first Kearsney matriculant to obtain a distinction in English, and he gained distinctions in English each year thereafter, from teacher training to BA level. In 1956 he was awarded a medal for best final-year student at NTC.

At NTC he met Isobel Hickman, the previous final-year medallist and sister of inventor Ron Hickman, and they were married in 1958 in Greytown. From 1957 to 1961 Randall was employed by the Natal Education Department, and taught at Vryheid High School and Greytown Junior School. In late 1961 he and Isobel travelled to England, and from 1962 through 1963 they were employed as teachers by Essex County Council (Peter taught at Broadfields County Primary and Mark Hall Secondary, Harlow). During this time they toured Europe and Britain in an old Bedford van, and before returning to South Africa they worked as apple-pickers.

In early 1964 they returned to Pietermaritzburg, and from 1964 until mid-1965 Randall lectured at NTC and was the warden of the men's residence. Daughter Lee-Ann was born in 1964, and in 1965 they moved to Johannesburg, where their second daughter Susan was born. Their third child Jonathan died as an infant; a second son named David was born in 1970.

== Anti-apartheid activity ==
While a student at NTC, Randall took an interest in radical politics and approached Peter Hunter, a lecturer with similar views, with the hope of becoming constructively involved. Hunter took him to a school in Sobantu Village in Pietermaritzburg, where teachers had to learn Afrikaans because of the Bantu Education policy, and Randall went there several times to teach Afrikaans and to learn some Zulu. Other important influences on his thinking at this time were leading Liberal Party figures such as Peter Brown, author Alan Paton and senator Edgar Brookes.

From July 1965 to mid-1969 Randall was Assistant Director of the South African Institute of Race Relations, based in Johannesburg. The Institute published several titles by him, including a series of talks he gave on human rights and the need for social justice. From mid-1969 to 1972 he was Director of Spro-cas (Study Project on Christianity in Apartheid Society), which was sponsored by the Christian Institute and South African Council of Churches (SACC). Randall worked closely with Beyers Naudé who was heading the Christian Institute, and with other leading anti-apartheid clerics like Denis Hurley and Desmond Tutu. Although Spro-cas was intended as a relatively short-term project, it put together a substantial body of publications. Under the directorship of Randall, it published some 25 titles with the view to contributing to the search for social justice in South Africa. One of those was Cry Rage!, an innovative collection of anti-poems by James Matthews and Gladys Thomas, which became one of the icons of the Black Consciousness Movement.

"Spro-cas 1", the study project, was followed by "Spro-cas 2", the action project, again with Randall as Director. After discussions, particularly with Bennie Khoapa and Steve Biko, it was decided to split the project into a Black Community Programme and a White Consciousness Programme. The aim was for the BCP to develop community education programmes, and for the WCP, where a key figure was Horst Kleinschmidt, to make South African whites aware of social injustice and the need for change. The project ran until the BCP was banned in 1977. The story is told in A Taste of Power, the final Spro-cas report written by Randall. Although some details had to be glossed over in this book due to state restrictions on the media, it paid considerable attention to Black Consciousness as well as to the sins of the apartheid government.

The radical work of the Spro-cas projects drew varied responses and was discussed in public debate, as the following quotations indicate:

- "The Spro-cas reports seem all that is left of sanity in a land gone mad". - Anthony Richmond, The Cape Herald, Cape Town, 20 October 1973.
- "[Spro-cas is] a demonical movement originating from American Marxism". - Rev C.J. Mans, quoted in The Daily News Durban, 28 April 1973.
- "Much more cleverly disguised and therefore much more sinister… the Spro-cas missionaries have been the chief purveyors of the myths of Black Theology and Black Consciousness". - editorial The Education Journal, The Teachers' League, Cape Town, September 1973.
- "One achievement which clearly illustrates Spro-cas’s very dynamic flexibility is the easy and amicable emergence of an active black separatist movement within Spro-cas itself… its impact on political thought in South Africa has been considerable". - Marie Dyer, review in Reality, January 1974. (With reference to the Black Community Programs under the leadership of Steve Biko and Bennie Khoapa).
- "A ruthlessly logical summing up of the six Spro-cas commissions… one’s constant instinct is to cry: 'For God’s sake, surely government thinkers must take note of this'.” - Tony Richmond, review of A Taste of Power in The Cape Herald, Cape Town, 20 October 1973.
- “...noting the invaluable contribution the Spro-cas 1 publications have made to the awareness of South African society... strongly urges students to lend their full support to the Spro-cas 2 programs...” - Resolution 112, 48th Congress of the National Union of South African Students (NUSAS), 1972.
- “ All South Africans who are committed to bringing about change in our society should read the Spro-cas reports". -Black Sash Journal, August 1972.

From 1973 to October 1977 Randall was Director of Ravan Press, which was established in 1972 by Beyers Naudé, Danie van Zyl and Randall (the unusual spelling of "Ravan" is due to the word being made up of the initial letters of Randall, van Zyl, and Naudé). Randall's role was diverse: editor, publisher, salesman, and financial manager. In a time when "non-whites" were severely repressed by the government, Ravan Press became an important avenue through which dissident voices could be heard. Its first literary title was Sing for our Execution (1973) by Wopko Jensma, and Randall proceeded to develop an impressive list of emerging writers. His approach was that: "Artists are able to interpret our situation and speak to people of all groups in a universal medium and in a way that academics, journalists and clergy cannot because they are so firmly labelled in their ethnic or denominational boxes." Ravan had several publishing "firsts", most notable being the acceptance of J. M. Coetzee's first book, Dusklands, after it had been rejected by other South African and international publishers. Other firsts included works by Sipho Sepamla, Chabani Manganyi, Miriam Tladi, Peter Wilhelm, and Stephen Gray.

Due to his involvement in anti-apartheid publishing, Randall experienced severe state repression from 1970 onwards. His passport was confiscated in 1972 for a period of ten years. It was returned for one month in 1981, after pressure from German and American publishers for Randall to attend the Frankfurt Book Fair; it was returned in full in 1982. Randall was also prosecuted in 1973 under the Commissions Act for refusing to give evidence before the Schlebusch Commission, along with Beyers Naudé and others, and was sentenced to three months imprisonment, suspended. In 1974 the three founding directors of Ravan were prosecuted under the Internal Security Act for publishing the words of a "banned person" (Paul Pretorius of NUSAS), but the case was dismissed on a technicality because the security police confused Spro-cas and Ravan Press.

Randall also experienced harassment such as having his mail and telephone calls intercepted, attempts to plant spies, intimidation of bookshops not to stock Ravan titles, having his visitors trailed, cars being outside his house with listening devices in them, and so on. An unsuccessful attempt was made to entice both Randall and Naudé into a relationship with a buxom Post Office employee.

In 1974 Randall stood as a Social Democratic candidate in the Von Brandis constituency in central Johannesburg, in the national general election. Horst Kleinschmidt was his electoral agent, and to general surprise they managed to gain a thousand votes and save their deposit in a safe United Party seat.

The offices of Ravan Press in Braamfontein, Johannesburg were the target of bomb threats and acts of vandalism such as slogans being painted on the walls. Randall once endured a four-hour security police raid of Ravan (along with the other organisations in Diakonia House, such as the Christian Institute and SACC), during which every document and letter—and his personal diary—was scrutinised.

On 19 October 1977 Randall was served with a banning order by the Minister of Justice, Jimmy Kruger. At least forty black leaders were detained in the same month. The Christian Institute, The World, and eighteen other organisations—mainly black consciousness groups—were declared unlawful and were not allowed to continue their existence. Other white South Africans banned on the same day as Randall were Beyers Naudé, Cedric Mayson, Brian Brown, Donald Woods and Theo Kotze, all of whom were associated with the Christian Institute. The banning orders were to run for five years.

In terms of Randall's banning order, he was forbidden to attend gatherings (the legal consensus was that this meant meeting with more than one other person at a time); he was forbidden to leave the Johannesburg magisterial area without the permission of the chief magistrate, Mr Francis; and he was forbidden to enter schools, factories, publishing houses and so on. He was also required to report weekly to his local police station and sign the register, and when going on holiday he had to report to the local police station on arriving at his destination. To attend functions at his children's schools or take his family on holiday he had to seek permission, which was sometimes granted and sometimes not. Mr Francis would forward Randall's requests to the Minister, who would call for reports and recommendations from the Bureau of State Security (BOSS) and the security police, and the Minister would then instruct Francis. The granting or withholding of permission appeared to be completely arbitrary and no appeal was possible.

In 1981 Randall applied for permission to attend the Frankfurt Book Fair—a request which drew divergent responses from BOSS and the security police. The head of BOSS suggested that it was best to let Randall attend the Fair, stating that "hy sal in elk geval gemonitor word" (in any case he will be monitored). The monitoring, it seems, was carried out by an attractive young woman from the South African Embassy in Bonn, who befriended Randall at the Book Fair and subsequently followed him to England, then to Jersey (where he visited his brother-in-law, Ron Hickman OBE, the designer of the Lotus Elan sports car and inventor of the Black and Decker Workmate), and finally back to South Africa, where she left government service and became a drama teacher. In Frankfurt Randall considered applying for political asylum in the UK, thus going into exile there, but ultimately he decided against this. His banning order was lifted later the same year by the new Minister of Justice, Kobie Coetsee, after approaches from the Progressive Party and others.

Randall's role in the anti-apartheid movement may not always have been very public. The South African Council of Churches pays tribute to him on their website with these words: "The final list of twenty five publications in the four-year history (of Spro-cas) is testament to the courage and determination of Peter Randall and all who worked with him on the SPROCAS project." The effect of Randall's work reached into the heart of the Apartheid government as attested to by Mr Kobie Coetsee, then the Minister of Justice, and who is generally seen as one of the prime movers in facilitating the dialogue between Mr Nelson Mandela and the government. In an interview with Padraig O'Malley on 27 September 1997 he stated that exposure to people like Beyers Naudé, the thinking of Steve Biko, and works like A Taste of Power (by Randall, largely a summary of Spro-Cas publications) lead him and others to acknowledge the righteousness of aspirations that were unnatisfied and actively suppressed.

== Academic career ==
In 1977, prior to his banning, Randall was employed as a part-time temporary organiser of teaching practice by the Education Department at the liberal University of the Witwatersrand (Wits). His banning order meant that he could no longer officially work at Ravan Press, and Wits approached the Minister for permission to employ him full-time. This was granted after six months, during which Wits continued to pay his salary although he could not fulfill his duties. Unofficially, he did continue his involvement with Ravan, acting in an advisory capacity and carrying out some editorial responsibilities.

He remained in employment at Wits until his retirement in 1995, eventually becoming professor assignatus and director of teacher training. During this time he wrote an MEd dissertation on private schools, which was later published as Little England on the Veld. In 1989 he was awarded a PhD degree for his thesis on the role of the history of education in the training of teachers. Part of this research included Randall making study tours to the UK and US.

While at Wits University, Randall published a few academic articles and edited several collections. He delivered papers at international conferences held by the History of Education Society in Berlin, Lisbon, Cracow, and Dublin, some of which were published in the proceedings of the International Standing Committee on the History of Education. In the 1980s and 1990s Randall and his wife Isobel attended several conferences of the IBBY (International Book Board for Young People) in Groningen, Seville and Berlin, where they delivered joint papers.

After 1995 he continued as a part-time lecturer at Wits, a part-time editor at Ravan Press, and a book reviewer for Financial Mail. His career as a book reviewer had begun thirty years and some 300 titles earlier with the Rand Daily Mail, and during Randall's banning his reviews had appeared under his wife Isobel's name.

== Retirement and death ==
From 2002, Peter and Isobel Randall spent much of their time in the United Kingdom, establishing a new home and enjoying their retirement. In 2007, they both became naturalised British citizens while retaining their South African citizenship. During 2005–06, the South African History Archives (SAHA) obtained from the State Archives copies of all the reports and recommendations from BOSS and the security police relating to Randall. A copy of the documentation was given to Randall and another copy is archived by SAHA at Wits.

Isobel and Peter celebrated 66 years of marriage in January 2024, in Johannesburg. Peter had become increasingly frail over the years, and he was hospitalised on 29 February after a fall. Underlying health issues were found and treatment was started. He managed to return home for a few days, but he was soon admitted to hospital again after his health deteriorated. He had his 89th birthday in hospital, and his wife Isobel seldom left his bedside.

Randall had followed the events leading up to the May 2024 general election in South Africa with interest despite his condition. On 2 June, he asked to see a summary of the election results and was shown the IEC colour-coded map of the national and provincial results that had been finalised that day. He remarked on the striking political changes in his province of birth, KwaZulu-Natal, saying that "tribal loyalties" were evident. Randall died peacefully in hospital three days later, on 5 June 2024, surrounded by family members.

== Works ==
=== Archives ===
- The National Library of South Africa lists 46 works by Randall in its catalogue. These include earlier works of an educational nature for schools.
- The William Cullen Library at the University of the Witwatersrand holds a collection of Spro-cas titles and other works by Randall.
- The catalogue of the Library of Congress in Washington DC lists 20 of Randall's works.
- Copies of the Ravan Press correspondence between Randall and various authors (including J. M. Coetzee), as well as manuscripts, are archived in the National English Literary Museum in Grahamstown, South Africa.
- The South African Institute of Race Relations' archives include several of Randall's titles published between 1965 and 1969.

=== Individual works ===
- Anatomy of Apartheid. (1970) (Ed. Randall, P) Spro-cas publication #1. Spro-cas, Johannesburg.
- Guide to Malawi. (1971) Winchester Press, Johannesburg & Blantyre.
- South Africa's Minorities. (1971) (Ed. Randall, P) Spro-cas publication #2. Spro-cas, Johannesburg.
- Directions of Change in South African Politics. (1971) (Ed. Randall, P) Spro-cas publication #3. Spro-cas, Johannesburg.
- Some Implications of Inequality. (1971) (Ed. Randall, P) Spro-cas publication #4. Spro-cas, Johannesburg.
- Education beyond Apartheid: report of the Education Committee.(1971) (Ed. Randall, P) Spro-cas publication #5. Spro-cas, Johannesburg.
- Towards Social Change : report of the Social Commission. (1971) (Ed. Randall, P) Spro-cas publication #6. Spro-cas, Johannesburg. ISBN 0-86975-001-1. Details were also recorded in the personal diary of Isobel Randall, 19 October 1977.
- Power, Privilege and Poverty : report of the Economics Commission. (1972) (Ed. Randall, P) Spro-cas publication #7. Spro-cas, Johannesburg. ISBN 0-86975-004-6
- Apartheid and the Church : report of the Church Commission. (1972) (Ed. Randall, P) Spro-cas publication #8. Spro-cas, Johannesburg. ISBN 0-86975-006-2
- Law, Justice and Society : report of the Legal Commission. (1972) (Ed. Randall, P) Spro-cas publication #9. Spro-cas, Johannesburg. ISBN 0-86975-016-X
- South Africa's Political Alternatives : report of the Political Commission. (1973) (Ed. Randall, P) Spro-cas publication #10. Spro-cas, Johannesburg. ISBN 0-86975-022-4
- A Taste of Power : the final co-ordinated report. (1973) (Ed. Randall, P) Spro-cas publication #11. Ravan Press, Johannesburg. ISBN 0-86975-025-9
- "Confused Mhlaba." published in Index on Censoring Vol. 5, no. 4 (Winter 1976) pages 1–9.
- Not without honour : tribute to Beyers Naude. (1982) (Ed. Randall, P) Ravan Press, Johannesburg. ISBN 0-86975-138-7
- Little England on the veld : the English private school system in South Africa. (1982) Ravan Press, Johannesburg. ISBN 0-86975-220-0
- Survey of Race Relations in South Africa 1982. (1983) (Ed. Randall, P) South African Institute of Race Relations, Johannesburg.
- The Narrow Margin : how Black and White South Africans view change. (1983) (Eds. Fredman, S; Nell, M & Randall, P) David Philip Publishers, Cape Town. ISBN 0-908396-80-5
- Educating the educators : proceedings of a Conference on the Provision of Educators in South Africa, the university's role. (1983) (Eds. Freer, D & Randall, P): Department of Education, University of the Witwatersrand, Johannesburg.
- Addressing educational crisis & change : relevant private sector initiatives 11–12 March 1987 : the conference papers. (Ed. Randall, P) Centre for Continuing Education, University of the Witwatersrand, Johannesburg. ISBN 0-85494-992-5
- The role of the History of Education in teacher education in South Africa, with particular reference to developments in Britain and the US. (1988) Thesis (PhD) University of the Witwatersrand, Johannesburg.
- "Historico-Pedagogics and Teacher Education in South Africa." published in Perspectives in Education Vol II nr. 2.(Summer 1990) pages 36–47
- "The Church, Schooling and Segregation in Colonial South Africa." published in Paedagogica Historica International Journal of the History of Education, Supplementary Series Vol I. (1995) Ghent University, Belgium. ISSN 0030-9230, Online ISSN 1477-674X
- "The Beginnings of Ravan Press: a memoir." in Ravan: Twenty-five years (1972–1997). Published 1997 by Ravan Press, South Africa. ISBN 0-86975-496-3
- "From orthodoxy to orthodoxy: the study of education at the University of Cape Town, 1910 - 1980." published in Paedagogica Historica International Journal of the History of Education, Supplementary Series Vol III. (1998) Ghent University, Belgium. ISBN 90-800497-6-X

== See also ==
- List of people subject to banning orders under apartheid
