= B. B. Keet =

Barend Bartholomeus Keet (1885–1974) was an Afrikaner theologian.

He is best known for his rejection of the theological basis of separate development and apartheid policies. (Others in this category included Albert S. Geyser, Ben Marais, Ben Engelbrecht and C. F. Beyers Naudé.)

He was one of the translators of the first official translation of the entire Bible into Afrikaans, in 1933.

Keet (rhymes with Fiat, not seat) was born on 20 June 1885 in the town of Alice in the Eastern Cape Province. He was the fifth of the seven children of the Reverend B.B. Keet (De Beer 1992:9,10) and his wife, Jacoba Petronella Keet (De Beer 1992:7). He attended school first in Humansdorp, were his father was a preacher (c. 1894) and later in Cape Town (De Beer 1992:10).

Although Keet was an Afrikaner, English influences "were by no means outside his ken". The congregation in Humansdorp had the option of attending an evening service in English twice a month and young Bennie, as he was known, was friends with the son of the local "English preacher", despite the looming threat of the Anglo-Boer War (Second Boer War). De Beer is of the opinion that Keet's friendship with English-speaking children, with their differing language, beliefs and habits, helped to develop his relatively liberal character (1992:14), (1992:15).

Keet attended the South African College School (SACS) in Cape Town during that war and then completed studies for the degree of Bachelor of Arts at the South African College, in the same city. In 1907 he entered a theological college, where he was involved in the management of the Afrikaans Language Union (De Beer 1992:10–21, 33). From January 1911 to 1913 Keet was enrolled at the Free University in Amsterdam, where he worked towards a doctorate under the guidance of Herman Bavinck (De Beer 1992:40–41).

== Bibliography ==
- De Beer, J.C. 1992. B.B. Keet. (1885–1974) Ongepubliseerde Proefskrif: Universiteit van Stellenbosch
- De Gruchy, J.W. 2005. The Church Struggle in South Africa. 25th Anniversary Edition. Minneapolis: Fortress Press
- Heine, Q.E. 1986. Die Etiek van B.B. Keet. B.Th. Skripsie, Universiteit van dei Oranje Vrystaat. (In De Beer 1992)
- Keet, B.B. Klasaantekeninge Dogmatiek. Ongepubliseerde aantekeninge.
- Keet, B.B. 1945. Sedelike Vraagstukke. Kaapstad.
- Keet, B.B. 1955. Suid-Afrika – Waarheen? ’n Bydrae tot die bespreking van ons Rasseprobleem. Stellenbosch: Die Universiteits-uitgewers en Boekhandelaars.

Periodieke publikasies:

- Die Burger: Verskeie Uitgawes
- Die Kerkbode: Verskeie uitgawes
- The Rand Daily Mail: 3 Februarie 1956
