= Schlebusch Commission =

The Schlebusch Commission was a parliamentary commission established in 1972 by the South African government of Prime Minister BJ Vorster to investigate four anti-apartheid civil society organizations.

The recommendations of the Schlebusch Commission enabled the promulgation of the Affected Organisations Act (1974), with which the state could declare an organization "affected." An affected organization was denied foreign funding, while its funds and documents were seized. As a result, organizational activities were severely curtailed or effectively halted, as happened, respectively, with the National Union of South African Students on the one hand, and the Christian Institute of Southern Africa and the University Christian Movement on the other.

== History ==
Formally called The Commission of Inquiry into Certain Organisations, its colloquial name referred to its chair, Alwyn Schlebusch, National Party Member of Parliament (MP) for Kroonstad in the Orange Free State (1962–80).

The Schlebusch Commission was set up with the express purpose of investigating the Christian Institute of Southern Africa, the South African Institute of Race Relations, the University Christian Movement and the National Union of South African Students. "There was no charge sheet, witnesses were unaware of other evidence given, and were unable to cross-examine or lead evidence" (Merrett 1995:60). Among the commission's more prominent members was Kobie Coetsee, National Party MP for Bloemfontein and later Minister of Justice.

The influence of the Commission extended for over a decade, with Schlebusch warning the South African Council of Churches not to speak out against security legislation, fund political trials, or support political detainees.

== Commission reports and their consequences ==
The commission released its 4th interim report on 12 August 1974, dealing with the National Union of South African Students (Nusas), with particular attention to its Wages Commission. Consequently, Nusas and its affiliates were declared an affected organisation on 13 September, and its foreign funding cut off.

The commission's 5th interim report declared South African Institute of Race Relations (SAIRR) publications to be propaganda, but the organization was not deemed "affected".

In May 1975 the Christian Institute of Southern Africa (CI) was declared affected.

Employees who declined to provide evidence to the commission against their organizations were charged in court and some were convicted. Four SAIRR and nine CI officials were charged for refusing to give evidence. Because the state refused to make the commission's findings available to court, proceedings were often delayed.

== Other Schlebusch commissions ==
In 1980 the state convened the Commission of Inquiry on the Constitution, with Schlebusch as chair.

In 1985 Schlebusch chaired a commission that examined remuneration of various members of government.

== See also ==
- Alwyn Schlebusch
- Beyers Naude
- The Christian Institute of Southern Africa
- The National Union of South African Students
- The South African Institute of Race Relations
- The University Christian Movement
