= Albert Geyser =

South African cleric and theologian

Albertus Stephanus Geyser
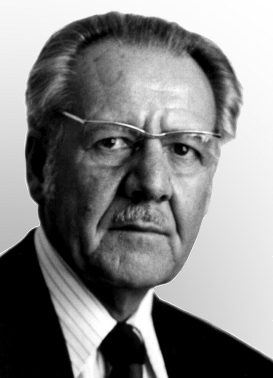
- Born: 10 February 1918; Naboomspruit, South Africa
- Died: 13 June 1985 (aged 67); Johannesburg, South Africa
- Occupation: Theologian / academic
- Spouse: Cecilia Margaretha van der Westhuysen (7 Sep 1917 - 6 Sep 1995)
- Children: 5
- Parent(s): Petrus Geyser, Maria Johanna Albertina Lamprecht

Albertus (Albert) Stephanus Geyser (10 February 1918 – 13 June 1985) was a South African cleric, scholar and anti-apartheid theologian. Geyser became an outcast in the white Afrikaner community because of his theological opposition to apartheid and to the Broederbond, the secret male Calvinist organisation that covertly steered South African politics during the apartheid era. He obtained master's and doctoral degrees cum laude, specializing in Greek and Latin. At the age of 27 he was appointed lecturer, and a year later, professor in the Theological Faculty of the Nederduitsch Hervormde Kerk at the University of Pretoria. Geyser contributed to the first annotated edition (1953–1958) of the Bible in Afrikaans, founded the Christian Institute, and was the first South African to be elected as a member of Studiorum Novi Testamenti Societas.

== Family background and early life ==
Albert Geyser was born to Maria Johanna Albertina ("Nina") Lamprecht and Petrus Geyser on 10 February 1918 on a farm near Naboomspruit, Transvaal province (now the town of Mookgophong in the Limpopo Province). Petrus and Maria had three children, including Albert's brother, Hendrik Johannes Geyser. The Geyser progenitor had immigrated to South Africa in 1725, and Albert's great-grandfather and grandfather had been among the founding members of the Nederduitsch Hervormde Kerk (NHK).

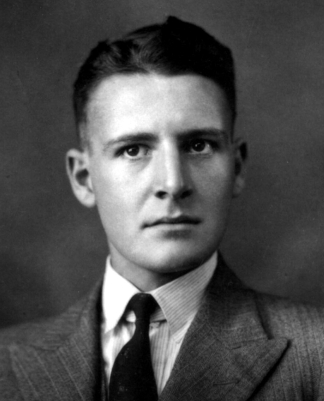
Albert Geyser, 1930s

Albert Geyser attended primary school in Ermelo, and matriculated from the Hoërskool (High School) Ermelo in 1935. With his brother, Hendrik, he was admitted to the University of Pretoria, with both intending to become ministers in the NHK. Albert earned his BA degree in Greek and Latin cum laude in 1938, followed by a BD in 1940. As denominational regulations required a minimum age of 23 years for appointment as a minister, Geyser worked in Cape Town until he became eligible in 1941. He was then invited to serve the congregations at Heilbron and at Parys in the Free State, where he was ordained and ministered from 1941 to 1943.

In the early 1940s Geyser married Cecilia Margaretha van der Westhuysen in Rustenburg and the couple had three sons and two daughters.

Geyser continued his studies at Pretoria and earned an MA in Greek and Latin in 1943. He served as minister of the NHK's Pretoria North-West congregation from 1944–1945. He completed additional courses in Aramaic and Syriac in 1945, adding these to his sound knowledge of Afrikaans, Hebrew, Greek, Latin, French, German, Dutch and English; meaning that he could "read 10 languages."

He earned a Doctor Divinitatis degree with distinction in 1946 on the topic of the genealogy of Jesus, also at the University of Pretoria. Geyser's was the first doctorate to be awarded by the Theology Faculty.

== Academic career ==
Geyser's academic career included professorial appointments at the University of Pretoria (1946-1961) and, subsequently, at the University of the Witwatersrand (1962-1983).

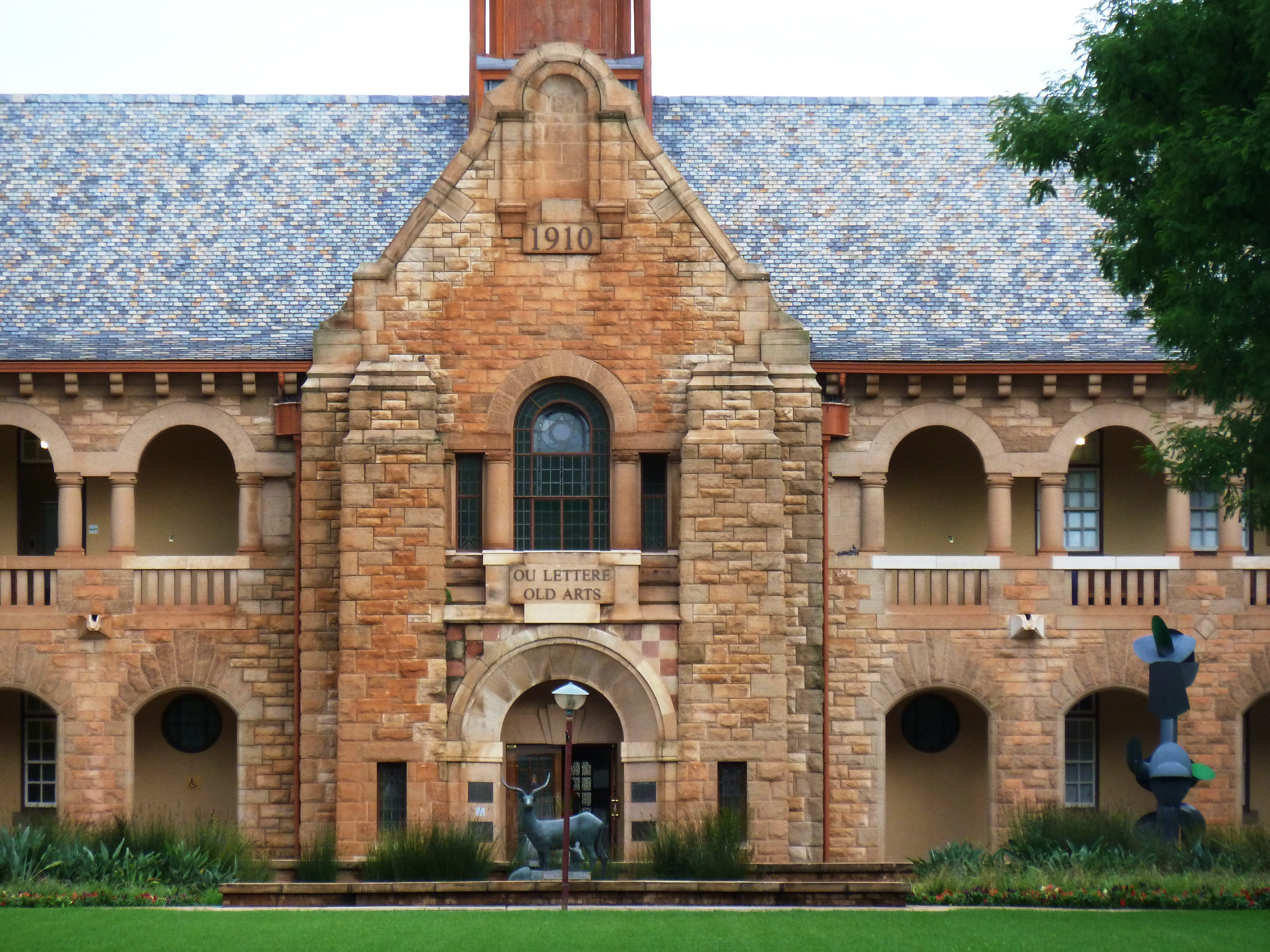
The Old Arts Building at the University of Pretoria where Geyser lectured. The Theology Faculty was housed in this building until 1980.

In August 1944 Geyser was nominated by the Theology Faculty as professor of New Testament Exegesis and successor to Professor J H J A Greyvenstein in the NHK's section at the University of Pretoria. Greyvenstein had reached retirement age in 1943, but the Faculty had permitted him to continue teaching until Geyser had obtained his doctorate. Geyser had registered in 1943 for a doctorate in Church History, but in September 1944 switched to New Testament studies with Professor Berend Gemser as doctoral advisor.

Geyser's appointment as professor produced controversies from the outset, relating to other faculty members, his lack of a doctorate, the selection of a rector for the University and, later, his theological interpretations and political views. His appointment had been subject to the completion of his doctorate.

Since 1944 Greyvenstein had wanted his successor to be either his student, S P J J van Rensburg, or the Dutch Dr Adrianus van Selms, lecturer in Semitic languages and Old Testament Studies in the Faculty since 1938. But by 1945 Van Rensburg lacked a doctorate, and although Van Rensburg had been given similar conditions to Geyser's, he fell out of contention as he took much longer than Geyser to complete his doctoral examinations. Van Selms was a prisoner of war in Japanese-held Indonesia, and would only return in 1946.

At the May 1945 general assembly of the NHK Greyvenstein requested to continue teaching beyond 1947 and mobilized some of his former students in support. Greyvenstein was particularly reluctant to surrender two of his three courses to Geyser, one of which he had handed off to C H Rautenbach in 1939. Another group solidified around Professor S P Engelbrecht in support of Geyser, who would have been left with only one course to teach if Greyvenstein had been allowed to continue. The NHK's General Assembly rejected Greyvenstein's position by a vote of 70 to 55, revealing that Geyser's ascension was far from unanimous. Disputes about Geyser's appointment continued through various official meetings until September 1946, when Greyvenstein abruptly retired, rendering it moot.

With regards to Geyser's academic qualifications, a Professor H P Wolmarans was concerned that Geyser's studies neglected theology in favour of classical languages. While Geyser completed the oral and written examinations well in August 1945, his examiners were divided about the quality of his doctoral dissertation. Only one of his three examiners, Professor J. De Zwaan of the University of Leiden, recommended that the degree should be granted cum laude, but this was the option endorsed by the council of the Faculty of Theology in March 1946.

After an initial appointment in 1946, Geyser was permanently appointed in September 1947 as professor and head of the Department of New Testament Science. Geyser insisted on taking all of Greyvenstein's subjects, including practical theology, Christian ethics, and dogmatics, forbidding students from attending Rautenbach's ethics class. Rautenbach aired his displeasure at Geyser's actions in various meetings. According to Adriaan Pont, former undergraduate of Geyser's and later his fiercest adversary, Rautenbach had opposed Geyser's appointment.

By 1948 Geyser, along with Gemser, was involved in the administration and maintenance of the official scholarly journal of the Faculty, Hervormde Teologiese Studies/Reformed Theological Studies. Meanwhile, Rautenbach was confirmed as rector of the University in March 1948.

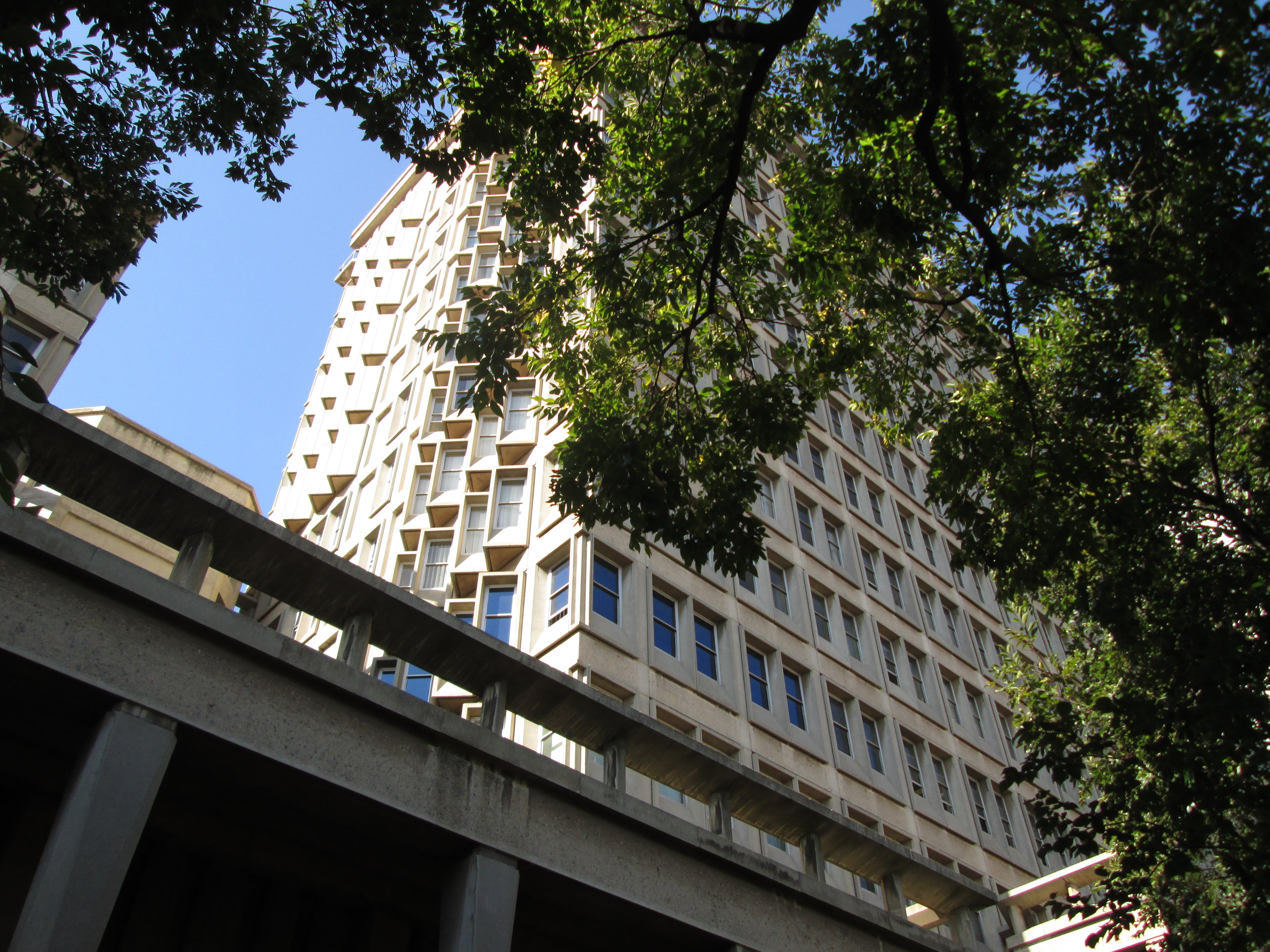
Senate House at the University of the Witwatersrand, where Geyser's office and the Department of Religious Studies were located on the northeast corner.

Geyser's position at the University of Pretoria afforded him the opportunity to study in Europe and to broaden his perspectives. The Rijksuniversiteit of Utrecht invited Geyser to lecture in New Testament studies for six months in 1951. Recognition of his academic stature is revealed by his election in 1951 as one of five international members on the Utrecht Theological Society's committee. He served on the editorial boards of Novum Testamentum and of Supplements to Novum Testamentum. He worked for six months in 1959 at the Faculté de Libre du Protenstantisme at the Sorbonne on the concept of "The Church in the New Testament". In 1959 he was invited to the Papal Institute in Rome to visit the excavations under St. Peter's Basilica.

As a result of disputes raised by colleagues such as Pont, and some of Geyser's students about his political views and theological interpretations, Geyser was forced to resign from the University of Pretoria in 1961. Rautenbach was instrumental in dismissing Geyser.

In 1964 Geyser became the first professor and head of the Department of Divinity (later renamed the Department of Religious Studies) at the University of the Witwatersrand, Johannesburg.

== Theological rejection of apartheid ==
Geyser's first years at the University of Pretoria (i.e. 1946-1952) continued his support for the racial policies of the South African government and of his denomination, which was evident during his ministry. Writing about the evolution of Geyser's thinking, Pieter de Villiers comments that "Geyser’s support of apartheid [at this time] is not surprising, since a racist lifestyle was firmly embedded in South African social life and accepted as self-evident." The NHK's missionary policy proceeded from the position that as only whites could be members of the denomination, missionary work should aim to establish separate churches for each people group ("nation"). The NHK would be such a volkskerk, providing an exclusive ecclesiastical home for white Afrikaners while adhering to " 'conservative Christian-national values'", as the Commission of the NHK's General Church Assembly noted in June 1967.

Geyser's personal political affiliation during this period is unclear. His lifelong adversary, Pont, accused Geyser of having then been aligned with the United Party. The United Party, led by former Field Marshal Jan Smuts, was for co-operation with Britain, while at home it stood for an informal segregation, opposed geographic separation and, by the 1960s, wanted a single citizenship for all South Africans. By contrast, the National Party came to power in 1948 on the basis of a rejection of co-operation with Britain and proposals to implement apartheid formally. J P Oberholzer argues that by 1956 Geyser was a member of the Suid-Afrikaanse Bond and the Suid-Afrika Eerste Beweging, without providing further explanation. Pont himself helped to form the Herstigte Nasionale Party in 1969, and unsuccessfully stood for the HNP in the 1970 city council election in Waterkloof, Pretoria.

Geyser's actions and writing after 1952 suggest that two factors in post-Second World War Europe may have contributed to his abandonment of race-based nationalism and his lifelong commitment to ecumenism. German churches were having to deal with their support for an ethnic nationalism and with the subsequent genocide of Jews that followed. In response to a rising need for ecumenism, the World Council of Churches (WCC) was established in 1948 in Amsterdam. During his European stay Geyser was increasingly influenced by progressive ecumenists who had emerged in the Netherlands and elsewhere.

Following his return from Europe, Geyser became increasingly critical of the use of theology as a basis for apartheid. In reaction to a government proposal which in effect would forbid blacks from attending churches in white areas, Geyser warned in a July 1957 letter to Die Vaderland newspaper that "The church must seriously reconsider whether it will allow the re-erection of barriers that have been broken down by Christ." Portions of Geyser's letter were republished in The Star of 24 July 1957. Geyser's Pretoria colleague Ben Marais had made similar statements during the annual Peter Ainslie Memorial Lecture at Rhodes University on 10 September 1957.

In 1955 Geyser joined 13 Afrikaans academics in signing a petition that condemned the National Party government's proposed removal of coloureds from Parliament and the stacking of the Senate with its own politicians to better achieve its aims. As the publication of the petition coincided with the launch of public protests by the official opposition party, Geyser was accused of transgressing the NHK's prohibition that clergy refrain from partisan actions or pronouncements.

Geyser's signing of the petition marked a turning point in his relations with those inside and outside the NHK, which worsened as he set out to refute any biblical justifications for apartheid. The NHK initially tolerated his views, permitting him an extensive hearing in the theological journal, Hervormde Teologiese Studies in 1960. Here he launched a scathing attack on the theological justification of apartheid advocated in the book "Eiesoortige Ontwikkeling tot Volksdiens," written by Professor A. B. du Preez, then Professor of Dogmatics in the Faculty of Theology (Section B) at the University of Pretoria.

While Geyser by 1960 still identified with those who called themselves Afrikaner "nationalists," he clearly meant the desire for political self-determination, not the more narrowly defined racist ideology intent on developing one group at the expense of others. This distinction emerges clearly in a 1969 essay in Pro Veritate in which he pointed out that the Protestant reformer Calvin was not a nationalist. Geyser was responding to claims by the conservative politicians Andries Treurnicht and Albert Hertzog that Afrikaner nationalism, which rejects "English" liberalism, derives from Calvin's teachings.

In the context of the Sharpeville massacre in 1960 Geyser used public media more intensively to castigate the government for its unjust draconian laws. He joined a group of 350 Afrikaans clergy who met secretly in Johannesburg and Pretoria for six months to discuss the nature and effects of apartheid policies on churches. As a direct result of these consultations, a book titled Vertraagde Reaksie (Delayed Action) was produced, comprising contributions by 11 authors, edited by Geyser and Stellenbosch theologian B B Keet. Constituting "the first formal protest of Afrikaans theologians against apartheid," the book aimed to help churches express their public witness and Christian calling in a context marked by the increasing miseries caused by apartheid legislation. Geyser and Marais clarified in an interview with Die Transvaler newspaper on 21 November 1960 that "the book was not written for politicians or to promote rebellion in church and state. It was not intended as a political pamphlet, but rather as a theological document with political consequences."

The Broederbond led a smear campaign against Geyser and the other authors. Geyser was painted as an enemy of Afrikaners by journalists, church leaders, and members of the public, and received death threats. At a public meeting in Brits in January 1961, attended by about 3,000 people, the contributors to Vertraagde Reaksie were denounced as conspiring with the ecumenical movement to bring about the demise of Afrikaner people. Geyser's colleague from the Theology Faculty, Pont, told participants that the authors were " 'demanding the suicide of the white people in South Africa'." The effect of such attacks by colleagues and the media was to isolate Geyser completely. Invitations to preach or to participate in church events decreased dramatically, denying Geyser opportunities to present his views to others.

== Relation to the Cottesloe Consultation ==
Geyser received international support for his views when, following the Sharpeville Massacre in 1960, the World Council of Churches sent a delegation to meet with clerics in the Johannesburg suburb of Cottesloe. The Cottesloe Consultation resulted in 17 recommendations, three of which caused great commotion in the Afrikaans media:

- The church must not discriminate on the basis of skin colour or race.
- There are no biblical grounds for a ban on mixed marriages.
- The possession of land and participation in government are inalienable human rights.

The recommendations were rejected outright by the Broederbond, the leading National Party and Prime Minister Verwoerd, who claimed foreign powers were interfering with South Africa's domestic policies. As a result of this conflict the NHK and the Nederduits Gereformeerde Kerk (NGK) withdrew from the WCC. While Geyser was not a representative at Cottesloe he strongly supported the recommendations and continued to launch fierce attacks on the NHK, particularly on its understanding of the concept of catholicity and on its policy with regard to missionary work.

Following the Cottesloe Consultation Geyser became an opponent of Article III of the NHK constitution, which specifically forbids blacks as members. It was inevitable that he would clash with what he saw as the "ideological theology" of his own and other Afrikaans churches. This made his position as a Professor in the Faculty of Theology of the Church untenable, both for the Church and for himself.

== Accusations of heresy ==
In January 1961 two mass protests against the authors of Delayed Action, attended by thousands of Afrikaners, were organised by Pont, then professor of church history in the Faculty of Theology at the University of Pretoria.

In September 1961 the Broederbond-controlled leadership of the NHK responded to complaints by three students and accused Geyser of heresy and insubordination because of his interpretation of Philippians 2:5–11. The written charges against him comprised 13 pages, accusing him of saying that God's love (agape) knew no racial boundaries; of breaking regulations that prohibited criticism of NHK decisions; denying that apartheid had any Biblical basis; and attempting to organize a meeting between his students and Catholic seminarians.

He was asked to resign his professorship of New Testament Studies because the chair was sponsored by the NHK. While he was acquitted on the charges of insubordination, he was found guilty of heresy by the Synodal Commission of the NHK and expelled in May 1962. It was widely accepted that the NHK used the accusation of heresy in an attempt to remove Geyser because of his opposition to Article III of the NHK constitution and his "deviant" views on racial matters. Geyser felt he was falsely accused and contested the Commission's findings in the Supreme Court. During the subsequent court case the NHK reached an out of court settlement and he was reinstated. However these conflicts continued to be a source of tension and Geyser resigned as minister of the NHK in 1963.

Geyser left the University of Pretoria in 1962 after successfully applying for the position as the first professor and Head of the Department of Divinity (now the Department of Religious Studies) at the University of the Witwatersrand.

== Founding of The Christian Institute of South Africa ==
During the early 1960s Geyser befriended Beyers Naudé and disclosed to him his idea of establishing a movement which would bring together ecumenically minded Christians in Southern Africa with a view to a united witness against the ideology of apartheid and its negative consequences in church and society. The Christian Institute of Southern Africa was formed in 1963, and Geyser as the chairman of the board of directors had little difficulty in persuading Naudé, then a minister of the NGK, to become its first director.

For some years the friendship between Naudé and Geyser endured the direction in which Naudé steered the Christian Institute. But according to one biographer of Geyser's, when Naudé joined Desmond Tutu in agitating for international action against South Africa, this alienated Geyser both from Naudé and from the Christian Institute. Naudé and the Christian Institute were subsequently banned by the National Party Government in 1977. For Geyser the failure of the Christian Institute was one of the greatest disappointments of his life.

== Unmasking Broederbond members ==
Naudé asked Geyser for his advice because the anti-apartheid stance of the Christian Institute was increasingly at odds with his membership of the Broederbond. To help Geyser understand the tensions between these two loyalties Naudé provided Geyser with a number of secret Broederbond documents which included minutes of meetings and the names of members of the Broederbond. Unknown to Naudé, Geyser (who was a keen amateur photographer) made photostats of the documents before returning them. Geyser's advice was crucial in Naudé's subsequent decision to resign from the Broederbond.

In November 1963 the English newspaper, The Sunday Times published the Broederbond documents and Naudé was initially blamed for the leak. In reality it was Geyser who had leaked the documents to a journalist at the newspaper. In his statement on 20 November 1963, Geyser said that he had decided to make the documents public because he wanted to frustrate the aims of the Broederbond. According to Geyser the documents showed without a doubt that the Broederbond was using the Church for political ends: "My immediate observation was that these people were making the Church, which is the bride of Christ, a servant girl of politics". The Broederbond reported the documents stolen and the offices of Naudé and Geyser were raided by the security police. The fact that the raids were not conducted through normal police operations but by the security police implied that the actions of the leaders of the Christian Institute were now regarded as a matter of national security. The Christian Institute continued to be a target for security police raids and attacks in the Afrikaans media.

== Court cases against defamation ==
During 1964 and 1965 Pont wrote a series of articles in Die Hervormer, the monthly magazine of the NHK in which he accused Naudé and Geyser of various misdemeanours, including:

- Supporting and promoting communism and its objectives
- Advocating sabotage and planning a revolution
- Pretending to be Christians but in reality seeking to destroy Christianity
- Supporting the massacre and murder of white women and children
- Committing heresy and opposing the Afrikaner churches

Pont also accused the Christian Institute of being a front for communist activities. Naudé and Geyser sued Pont and the editor of Die Hervormer for defamation (libel). The editor immediately acknowledged that the offending articles contained "crass, untrue and defamatory statements" and expressed his "deep and sincere regret", but Pont refused to retract his comments. The case was determined in Naudé and Geyser's favour in February 1967 and Pont was ordered to pay Naudé and Geyser R20,000 damages each and also pay their legal costs (R150,000). At the time it was the largest amount ever awarded in South Africa as damages for defamation.

As the NHK never censored Pont but issued a letter supporting him to its congregations, Geyser asked for a meeting with NHK officials, where he called on them to repent, before telling them that he and his wife were leaving the denomination.

== Consequences of opposition and death ==
Geyser retired from his professorship in 1983 after 20 years of academic work at the University of the Witwatersrand. He continued his public denouncements of apartheid through a number of writings and interviews despite the high price paid by his family, who were ostracised and physically threatened. Geyser himself survived an assassination attempt when the brakes on his car were reportedly tampered with. In an interview with the Sunday Express in January 1983 he warned that: "A Church in isolation is doomed to futility. It has no function and becomes a museum piece, because the very concept of a Church is that it should be universal". The last 20 years of his life he formally belonged to no church, but attended services in the Anglican, Presbyterian and Nederlands Hervormde (Dutch Congregation) churches.

Geyser was hospitalised in 1985 following a minor heart attack. While recovering in hospital he penned a letter to President P. W. Botha urging him to atone for the role played by himself and the National Party in implementing apartheid after 1948. The letter, written in Afrikaans, was headed: "Consensus, conciliation, confidence, confession" and demonstrated that while Geyser was sympathetic to President Botha's reforms he continued to have theological reservations. In the letter Geyser states "I am sorry Mr President, even if you are now rowing back as hard as what the fear for the Conservative Party (CP) permits you, you are one of the oldest surviving people responsible. Do not regard it beneath you to accept and to confess guilt for your own share during your cabinet and Broederbond years…You can write off reform in South Africa as long as you allow this self-appointed self-propagating Afrikaner aristocracy to circumvent and undermine the democratic processes in South Africa". Commenting on the role of the Broederbond in drafting the policy on apartheid, he wrote: "It was easy for this dark 'think tank' to succeed with its mutual self-promotion in the civil service, government circles, education and church, because it sidestepped the restraining but healthy experimenting station of public debate".

Geyser suffered a second, fatal heart attack before he was able to finish the letter, but the contents were published by The Sunday Star on 23 July 1985. Despite his estrangement from the NHK his last wish was for his funeral to be held at the Nederlands Hervormde (Dutch Congregation) church in Parktown, Johannesburg. The church granted him this final wish. Geyser was survived by his wife, three of his children and eight grandchildren.

== Legacy ==
Contemporaneous appraisals that lauded Geyser's political involvement included that of Alan Paton, president of the Liberal Party (LP). Paton lauded Geyser (with Beyers Naudé) in his opening address to the National Conference of the LP in July 1965 as "brave" for being willing "to suffer for what they believe to be right, and who can see that separate development is the great white myth". In 1988 the 64th issue of the Journal of Theology for Southern Africa was devoted to Geyser's memory, with contributions by former colleagues and students.

Concerted efforts have recently been made to restore Geyser's largely forgotten contributions to the resistance against apartheid. Individual and co-authored scholarly articles by A G van Aarde e.a. (1992, 2014) and Van Eck (1995) positively assessed his roles in theology, church and society. Geyser's arguments against the theological justification of apartheid, like that of his colleague Adrianus van Selms at Pretoria, lay the groundwork that ultimately led to its complete rejection in 2010 by the NHK. Van Selms was, with Berend Gemser, one of the dissenters from the NHK's theological justification of apartheid.

Geyser's theological interpretations which led to his successful court cases against the NHK and Pont affected the content and style of the NHK's theologians for at least two decades. The denomination's pronouncements, to counter Geyser's, became ever more explicitly aligned with apartheid.

In a 2011 memorial lecture in Leeuwarden Casper Labuschagne highlighted that it was Geyser who had initiated the formation of the Christian Institute and had co-founded the ecumenical newspaper Pro Veritate with Ben Engelbrecht. Labushcagne had been dismissed from the University of Pretoria in 1967 for supporting Geyser, and subsequently emigrated to the Netherlands. In 2014 an annual memorial lecture in honour of Geyser was instituted by the Faculty of Theology at the University of Pretoria. The first such lecture was presented by James Loader, whom the Faculty denied an appointment due to his opposition to the NHK's racial viewpoints.

Journalist Benjamin Pogrund described Geyser as demonstrating "awesome intellectual courage and emotional strength" through his willingness to re-examine and reject the religious ideology behind apartheid, regardless of the consequences. Sowetan columnist and political commentator Prince Mashele wrote: " 'True virtue is not when a man defends his own interests, but when he endangers his life in defence of others. This is precisely what Geyser did. It is time for us, black people, to wage a 'Geyser must rise' campaign to protect the legacy of a white man who proclaimed that blacks were human at a time when such a basic truth was heresy.' "

== Publications ==
- (1943). Die Iphigeneia Aulidensis van Euripides: 'n kritiese ontleding. MA thesis, University of Pretoria. OCLC No. 810135256.
- (1945). "Die vroegste heidenberig oor Christus en die Christene. HTS Teologiese Studies / Theological Studies. 2:1, p. 5-16. DOI: 10.4102/hts.v2i1.3334.
- (1946). "Die beeld van God volgens die Nuwe Testament. HTS Teologiese Studies / Theological Studies. 3: 3/4, p. 202-209. DOI: 10.4102/hts.v3i3/4.3559.
- (1946). Die geslagsregister van Jesus Christus volgens Matth. 1:1-17 en Luk. 3:23-38. D D dissertation, University of Pretoria. OCLC No.: 830564996.
- (1946). "Teksverbeteringe van die Afrikaanse Bybel - Nuwe Testament. HTS Teologiese Studies / Theological Studies, 2: 4, p. 187-190. DOI: 10.4102/hts.v2i4.3526.
- (1950). "Die wenslikheid van 'n hersiening van die Afrikaanse vertaling van die Bybel. III. Die Evangelie volgens Markus." HTS Teologiese Studies / Theological Studies. 6, 4. DOI: 10.4102/hts.v6i1/2.3607.
- (1951). "Antwoord aan Prof. P.V. Pistorius." HTS Teologiese Studies / Theological Studies. 8, 1.
- (1951). "Die betrekking tussen Jesus en Johannes die Doper." HTS Teologiese Studies / Theological Studies. 7.
- (1952). Die navolging van Christus. Vertaal...toegelig en ingelei deur Dr. A.S. Geyser. Kaapstad: H.A.U.M.
- (1953). "Die "Eerste Algemene Kerkvergadering". HTS Teologiese Studies / Theological Studies. 9.
- (1953). "Lukas se Segsman vir die Geskiedenis van die Emmausgangers." HTS Teologiese Studies / Theological Studies. 9: 2.
- (1953). "Wyle Prof. H.G. Viljoen." HTS Teologiese Studies / Theological Studies. 9: 2.
- (1954). "Voorwaardes vir die prediking." HTS Teologiese Studies / Theological Studies. 11:1, 1-7.
- (1957). "The Youth of John the Baptist: A Deduction from the Break in the Parallel Account of the Lucan Infancy Story." Novum Testamentum. 1, 1: 70-80. Co-author with H. B. Kossen. DOI: 10.1163/156853685X00553.
- (1959). "Die name van Petrus en I. Petrus." HTS Teologiese Studies / Theological Studies. 15.
- (1960). Vertraagde aksie: 'n ekumeniese getuienis vanuit die Afrikaanssprekende kerk. (A.S Geyser & B.B. Keet, eds.). Pretoria: HAUM.
- (1960). "Die Eerste Evangelie oor die eenheid van die kerk as Christusgetuienis," in Vertraagde aksie - : 'n ekumeniese getuienis vanuit die Afrikaanssprekende kerk. (A.S Geyser & B.B. Keet, eds.). Pretoria: HAUM, 12–23.
- (1960). "Un Essai d'Explication de Rom. XV. 19." New Testament Studies, 6, 2: pp. 156–159. DOI: 10.1017/S0028688500000813.
- (1961). "Barnabas: Van Leviet tot Apostel." HTS Teologiese Studies / Theological Studies. 17.
- (1961). "Die Skrif beveel 'n sigbare eenheid van die Kerk." Hervormer. 51: 12.
- (1961). "Logos en Ideologia: Woord en Skynwoord." HTS Teologiese Studies / Theological Studies. 16: 4.
- (1962). Christian Nationalism and academic freedom: address delivered at the University of Cape Town on 12 June. Cape Town: National Union of South African Students.
- (1964). Living together. Addresses by T.G.V. Inman & A.S. Geyser to the C.U.S.A. assembly, Durban, October. Johannesburg: Congregational Union of South Africa. Ed. C. Kemp. OCLC No. 1017324513.
- (1964). The herald's wand in the sending of the twelve. Inaugural lecture delivered 2 October. Johannesburg: Witwatersrand University Press. OCLC No. 896744056.
- (1965). Freedom and Order. Address delivered by Albert Geyser on the UCT day of affirmation of academic and human freedom, May. Cape Town: publisher not identified. 8 pages. OCLC No. 63496894.
- (1969). "Calvyn was nie 'n Nasionalis nie." Pro Veritate, June. pp. 4–6.
- (1970). "The Semeion at Cana of the Galilee." Studies in John. Presented to Professor Dr. J. N. Sevenster on the Occasion of his Seventieth Birthday. Ed. W.C. van Unnik. Novum Testamentum, Supplements. 24: 12-21. Leiden: Brill. ISBN 978-90-04-26601-8. DOI: 10.1163/9789004266018.
- (1975). "The Letter of James and the social condition of his addressees." Neotestamentica. 9: 25-33.
- (1978). "Jesus, the Twelve and the Twelve tribes in Matthew." Neotestamentica. 12: 1-19.
- (1980). Aspects of Jewish life in South Africa: Three lectures. B. M. Casper, A. S. Geyser, I. Norwich. Johannesburg: Friends of the Library, University of the Witwatersrand.
- (1980). "The place of the Bible in religious education." Journal of Theology for Southern Africa. 33,4: 16-23.
- (1986). "Israel in the fourth gospel." Neotestamentica. 20: 13-20.
