= Beyers Naudé =

South African cleric, theologian and anti-apartheid activist (1915 - 2004)

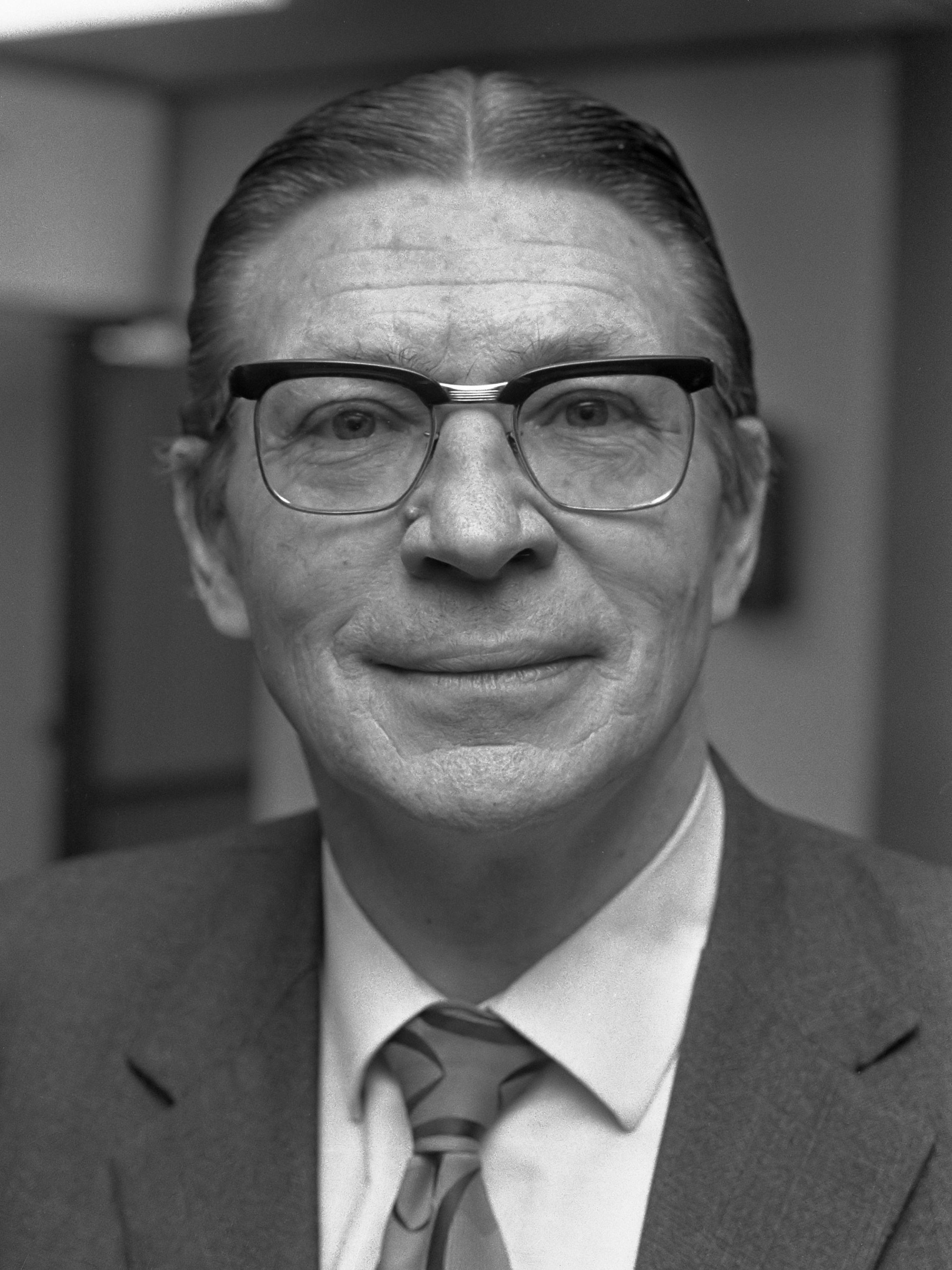
- Naudé in 1972
- Born: Christiaan Frederick Beyers Naudé; 10 May 1915; Roodepoort, Transvaal,^{[a]} South Africa
- Died: 7 September 2004 (aged 89); Johannesburg, Gauteng, South Africa
- Other name: Oom Bey ("Uncle Bey")
- Education: Stellenbosch University
- Occupation: Cleric
- Known for: Anti-apartheid activist
- Spouse: Ilse Hedwig Weder
- Father: Jozua Naudé

Notes
- a. Now Gauteng

Christiaan Frederick Beyers Naudé (10 May 1915 – 7 September 2004) was a South African Afrikaner Calvinist Dominee, theologian and the leading Afrikaner anti-apartheid activist. He was nicknamed Oom Bey (Afrikaans for "Uncle Bey").

== Early life and education ==
One of eight children, Beyers Naudé was born to Jozua François Naudé and Adriana Johanna Naudé (née) van Huyssteen in Roodepoort, Transvaal (now Gauteng). The progenitor of the Naudé name was a French Huguenot refugee named Jacques Naudé who arrived in the Cape in 1718. The Naudé surname is one of numerous French surnames that retained their original spelling in South Africa. Beyers Naudé was named after General Christiaan Frederick Beyers, under whom his father had served as a soldier and unofficial military chaplain during the second Anglo-Boer War.

Jozua Naudé, an Afrikaner Calvinist minister, or "Dominee", "was convinced that the British would never leave." He helped to found the Broederbond (Afrikaans, "Brotherhood" or "League of Brothers"), the powerful Afrikaner Calvinist men's secret society that played a dominant role in South Africa under apartheid. The Broederbond became especially synonymous with the Afrikaner-dominated National Party that won power in 1948 and implemented the racial segregation policy of apartheid. The elder Naudé also helped produce the earliest translations of the Bible into the newly standardized language of Afrikaans.

In 1921, the Naudé family moved to the Cape Province town of Graaff-Reinet, in the Karoo region. Beyers Naudé attended Afrikaans Hoërskool [Afrikaans High School], matriculating in 1931. Naudé studied theology at the University of Stellenbosch and lived at Wilgenhof men's residence. He graduated in 1939 with an MA in languages and a theology degree. His sociology lecturer was the future prime minister and chief-architect of apartheid, H. F. Verwoerd. But Naudé credited Stellenbosch theologian Ben Keet with laying the groundwork for his own theological dissent.

Naudé was ordained in 1939 as a minister in the South African Dutch Reformed Church and joined the Broederbond as its youngest member. For 20 years he served various congregations, starting at Wellington in Western Cape Province (1940–1942), Loxton (1942–1945), Pretoria - South-Olifantsfontein (1945–1949), Pretoria East (1945–1954), Potchefstroom (1954–1959) and Aasvoëlkop (Johannesburg) (1959–1963) preaching a religious justification for apartheid. On 3 August 1940 Naudé married Ilse Weder, whose father had been a Moravian missionary. The couple had three sons and a daughter.

== Anti-apartheid activities ==
The Sharpeville massacre in 1960 (during which the South African police killed 69 black demonstrators protesting against restrictions on their freedom of movement) ended his support for his church's political teachings. He began to question the biblical justification of apartheid by the Dutch Reformed Church: "I made an intensive study of the Bible to prove that those justifications were not valid. I concluded that the passages that were being used by the white DRC to justify apartheid were unfounded. In some cases, there was a deliberate distortion in order to prove the unprovable!" In the three decades after his resignation from the denomination, Naudé's vocal support for racial reconciliation and equal rights led to upheavals in the Dutch Reformed Church.

=== Cottesloe and the Christian Institute of Southern Africa ===
In response to Sharpeville, the World Council of Churches (WCC) sent a delegation to Johannesburg to meet with clerics. Naudé, by then the moderator of his church district (the Southern Transvaal Synod), helped to organize a consultation (the Cottesloe Consultation) between the WCC and eighty South African church delegates in Cottesloe, a Johannesburg suburb. The Cottesloe Consultation's resolutions rejected race as the basis of exclusion from churches, and affirmed the right of all people to own land and have a say in how they are governed. Naudé, alone among his church's delegates, steadfastly continued to reject any theological basis for apartheid after Prime Minister Verwoerd forced the DRC delegation to repudiate the consultation. The Dutch Reformed Church later left the World Council of Churches.

In 1963 Naudé founded the Christian Institute of Southern Africa (CI), an ecumenical organization with the aim of fostering reconciliation through interracial dialogue, research, and publications. The DRC forced Naudé to choose between his status as minister and directorship of the CI. He then resigned his church post, left his Aasvoëlkop congregation in Northcliff, Johannesburg, and resigned from the Broederbond in 1963. As a result, he lost his status as minister in the Dutch Reformed Church. His last sermon to his congregation noted that "We must show greater loyalty to God than to man". Stoically anticipating the enormous pressure by the Afrikaner political and church establishment that was to come, he told his wife: "We must prepare for ten years in the wilderness." Fellow clergyman Archbishop Desmond Tutu later said "Beyers became a leper in the Afrikaner community."

During the same year, Naudé was blamed for leaking secret, confidential, and unauthorized documents about the Broederbond to the press. The University of the Witwatersrand New Testament scholar Professor Albert S. Geyser later admitted that he had leaked the documents. Naudé had given the documents to Geyser to evaluate the extent of the influence of the Broederbond on the church. Geyser then provided the information to a journalist at The Sunday Times. The book The Super-Afrikaners. Inside the Afrikaner Broederbond, written by Ivor Wilkins and Hans Strydom and published in 1978, exposed a name list of possible members of the Broederbond. The source of these documents, that was taken without authorization, was blamed on Naudé. In 1967 Naudé and Geyser won a libel case against conservative Pretoria Professor Adriaan Pont, who had called them communists.

In 1970 Naudé was among a few white South African Christian leaders "who openly called for understanding of the WCC decision" to provide financial support for liberation movements in southern Africa. "If blood runs in the streets of South Africa it will not be because the World Council of Churches has done something but because the churches of South Africa have done nothing," Naudé said. In response, the state formed the Schlebusch Commission in 1972 to investigate anti-apartheid Christian organizations. When Naudé refused to testify, he was tried and imprisoned. After a night in the cells, a DRC minister paid his fine.

During a 1972 trip to Germany and Britain, Naudé preached at Westminster Abbey, "the first Afrikaans theologian to be so honoured". In 1973 the state withdrew his passport, but temporarily returned it in 1974 so that he could travel to the University of Notre Dame, South Bend, Indiana USA, to receive the Reinhold Niebuhr Award for justice and peace.

As the CI increasingly incorporated black African radicals like Steve Biko, Naudé had to bear the brunt of harassment by the state security police. The state eventually forced the CI to close in 1977.

=== Banning and the SACC ===
During a major conference of the South African Council of Churches in Hammanskraal in 1974, Naudé (who was a delegate) seconded a motion proposed by Presbyterian Church of Southern Africa minister Douglas Stephen Bax advocating for conscientious objection in relation to military conscription, which was forcing young South Africans to prop up the Apartheid state through mandatory service regardless of their personal political opinions. Bax had drafted the final version of the motion, with help from Naudé and another associate, and it was eventually adopted as the SACC's final resolution at the end of the conference. It would become known as the Hammanskraal Resolution.

From 1977 to 1984 the South African government "banned" Naudé – a form of house arrest with severe restrictions on his movements and interactions. For example, he could not be in the same room with more than one other person. Other leaders of the Christian Institute suffered the same fate, including Brian Brown, Cedric Mayson, and Peter Randall. Although under constant police surveillance, Naudé managed to secretly help anti-apartheid resistors move around and out of South Africa by providing them with old vehicles that he had repaired himself. He later joked that this was "My small contribution to a struggle I knew was right." His ANC liaison was Sydney Mufamadi, who became Minister of Provincial and Local Government in the post-apartheid government.

In 1980 Naudé and three other DRC theologians broke with the DRC and were accepted as clergy by the Dutch Reformed Church in Africa, the black African denomination established by the white Dutch Reformed Church.

After his unbanning in 1985, he succeeded Archbishop Desmond Tutu as secretary general of the South African Council of Churches. In this role he called for the release of political prisoners (especially Nelson Mandela) and negotiation with the African National Congress. In 1987 the apartheid regime outlawed public pleas for the release of detainees. But Naudé pressed Christians to continue to publicly pray for detainees, despite government threats of imprisonment.

After his term at the South African Council of Churches ended, Naudé continued to serve a number of anti-apartheid and development organizations, including the Defence and Aid Fund for Southern Africa, the Ecumenical Service for Socio-Economic Transformation, Kagiso Trust, and the Editorial Board of Challenge Magazine.

== Post-apartheid influence ==
After 1990 Naudé occasionally opened ANC events with scripture readings. That same year he was invited by the African National Congress to be the only Afrikaner member on their delegation in negotiations with the National Party government at Groote Schuur. Despite his long association with the African National Congress, Naudé never actually joined the party. Some have speculated that this, along with his advanced age and constant ill health during the last few years of his life, caused him to be politically sidelined. Others conclude that Naudé harbored a fierce independence and never sought personal advancement. Despite his association with the ANC, for instance, he also maintained ties with the black consciousness movement and the Pan Africanist Congress.

In 2000 he signed the Declaration of Commitment by White South Africans, a public document that acknowledged that apartheid had damaged black South Africans.

After his death at 89 on 7 September 2004, Nelson Mandela eulogized Naudé as "a true humanitarian and a true son of Africa." Naudé's official state funeral on Saturday 18 September 2004 was attended by President Thabo Mbeki, other dignitaries, and high-ranking ANC officials. Naudé's ashes were scattered in the township of Alexandra, just outside Johannesburg. He was survived by his wife, four children, and two great-grandchildren.

Despite being persecuted by his own ethnic group, Naudé "never outwardly expressed spite for his former opponents. 'I am an Afrikaner,' he said. 'I saw myself never as anything else but an Afrikaner, and I'm very grateful for the small contribution which I could have made.'"

== Honors and accolades ==
During his life Naudé received several honors, including the Bruno Kreisky Award for services to human rights (Austria, 1979), the Franklin D. Roosevelt Four Freedoms Award (USA, 1984), the African American Institute Award (USA, 1985), Robert F. Kennedy Human Rights Award (USA, 1985) along with Allan Boesak and Winnie Mandela, the Swedish Labour Movement Award (Sweden, 1988), the Order of Oranje-Nassau (Netherlands, 1995), Order for Meritorious Service (Gold) (South Africa, 1997), and the Order of Merit (Germany, 1999).

Naudé received fourteen honorary doctorates during his lifetime and in 1993 he was nominated for the Nobel Peace Prize by the American Friends Service Committee.

== Legacy ==
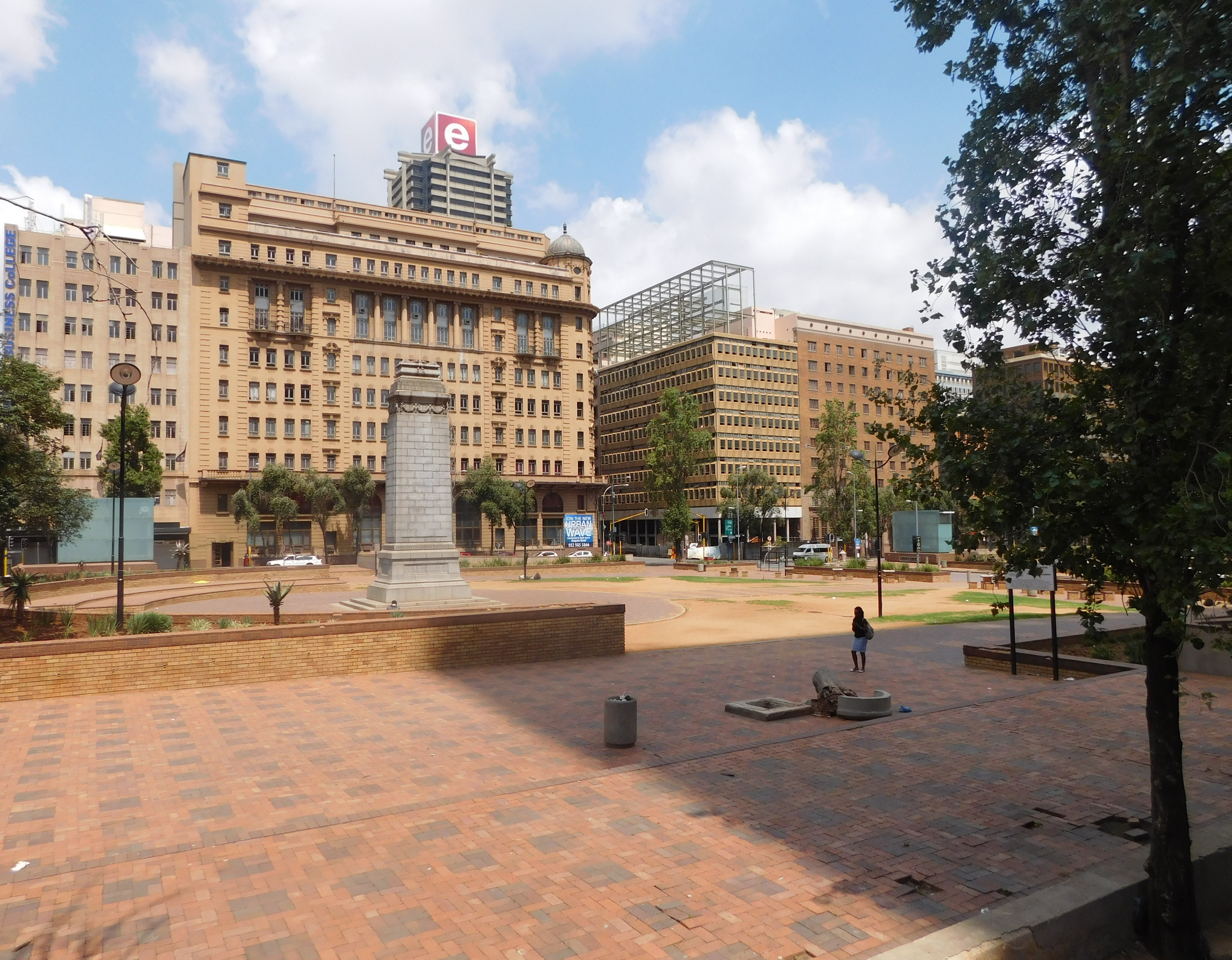
Part of Beyers Naude Square in 2016

In 2001 the city of Johannesburg, where he had lived most of his life in the suburb of Greenside, honored Naudé in several ways. Naudé received the Freedom of the City of Johannesburg while DF Malan Drive, a major road in Johannesburg, was renamed Beyers Naudé Drive. The Library Gardens in downtown Johannesburg, formerly known as Market Square, were renamed as Beyers Naudé Square. In 2004 Naudé was voted 36th among Top 100 Great South Africans in an informal poll conducted by a television program of the South African Broadcasting Corporation.

Naudé was called "one of the true Christian prophets of our time" by the acting secretary of the World Council of Churches, Georges Lemopoulos. Naudé's comments after the 1976 Soweto uprising presciently anticipated an outflow of South Africans in the post-apartheid era. He warned that white privilege could not and should not endure. "For many it will be impossible to live in this new South African society; they will be destroyed physically, emotionally and psychologically. They would be allowed to stay, but they would find the atmosphere unacceptable and therefore many will say, "we cannot adjust, we must go."" The University of the Free State changed the name of one of its hostels (JBM Hertzog) to Beyers Naudé. In Leeuwarden, Netherlands, the local Christian gymnasium (a middle school comparable to a grammar school) was renamed in honour of Beyers Naudé.

In the year 2002 a school in Soweto was named after him, Dr Beyers Naudé High School.

== See also ==
- Christian Institute of Southern Africa
- List of people subject to banning orders under apartheid
- Pro Veritate
- Ravan Press
