= Christian Institute of Southern Africa =

The Christian Institute of Southern Africa was an ecumenical progressive organisation founded by English and Afrikaans clergy in December 1963 to unite South African Christians against apartheid. The CI became deeply involved with black activists such as Steve Biko, and was banned by the state in 1977.

== History ==
The Christian Institute of Southern Africa was founded in 1963 by 280 Christians (Hexham 1980) that included Albert Geyser, Ben Marais, D. C. S. Oosthuizen, and John de Gruchy. Factors that contributed to the founding was the need to continue dialogue after the disastrous conclusion of the 1960 Cottesloe Consultation, the last time that all South African churches met until 1990. Reformed members of the CI could also critique official Dutch Reformed policies, which included support for apartheid. The 1963 South Transvaal Synod of the Dutch Reformed Church had forbidden unofficial comments that were not submitted through official channels (Maritz 2003:56).

The first national director of the Christian Institute (CI) was Dr C F Beyers Naudé. John de Gruchy, a Congregationalist minister and later an academic at the University of Cape Town, was a founder member. CI's constitution was drawn up by two Johannesburg advocates, Colin Kinghorn and Johann Kriegler (later a founding justice of the Constitutional Court of South Africa). Pro Veritate, a newsletter produced by Naudé, was adopted as the mouthpiece of the CI.

Brian Brown was CI's Administrative Director, Cedric Mayson edited Pro Veritate, while Theo Kotze (1920-July 4, 2003 ) directed the work of the CI in Cape Town. (De Gruchy 2005:104,109) . Peter Randall led the 'Study Project on Christianity in an Apartheid Society' that was jointly sponsored by the CI and the South African Council of Churches.

== See also ==
- Beyers Naudé

== Bibliography ==
- Brown, Robert McAfee. 1974. "Christian institute of Southern Africa vs the state of South Africa." Journal of Ecumenical Studies 11:99-102.
- de Gruchy, John W. with Steve de Gruchy. 2005. The Church Struggle in South Africa Minneapolis: Fortress Press.
- Knighton-Fitt, Jean (2003) Beyond Fear, Published by Pretext, Cape Town .
- Heaney, M J. 2004. "Onderhoud met Dr Beyers Naudé." [Interview with Dr Beyers Naudé] .
- Walshe, Peter. 1983. Church versus State in South Africa. The Case of the Christian Institute. London: Christian Hurst and New-York: Orbis.
