= Pro Veritate =

Former South African Christian monthly journal

Pro Veritate was a Christian independent monthly journal published in South Africa by the Christian Institute of Southern Africa from 1962 to 1977.

Articles reflected a theological and Christian point of view on a wide range of topics during the Apartheid era of South Africa. The journal was banned by the South African Government on 19 October 1977 under the Internal Security Act of South Africa.
