= 2014 South African general election =

- 7 May 2014

All 400 seats in the National Assembly 201 seats needed for a majority
- Registered: 25,388,082
- Turnout: 73.48% (▼3.82pp)
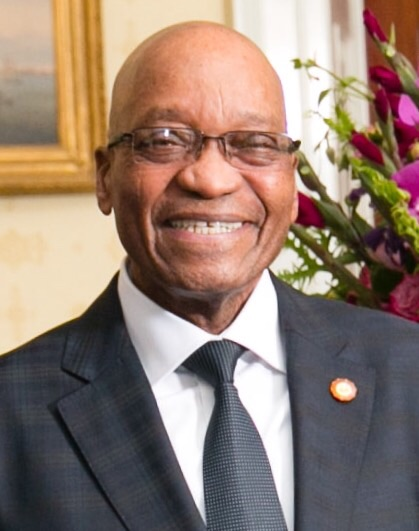

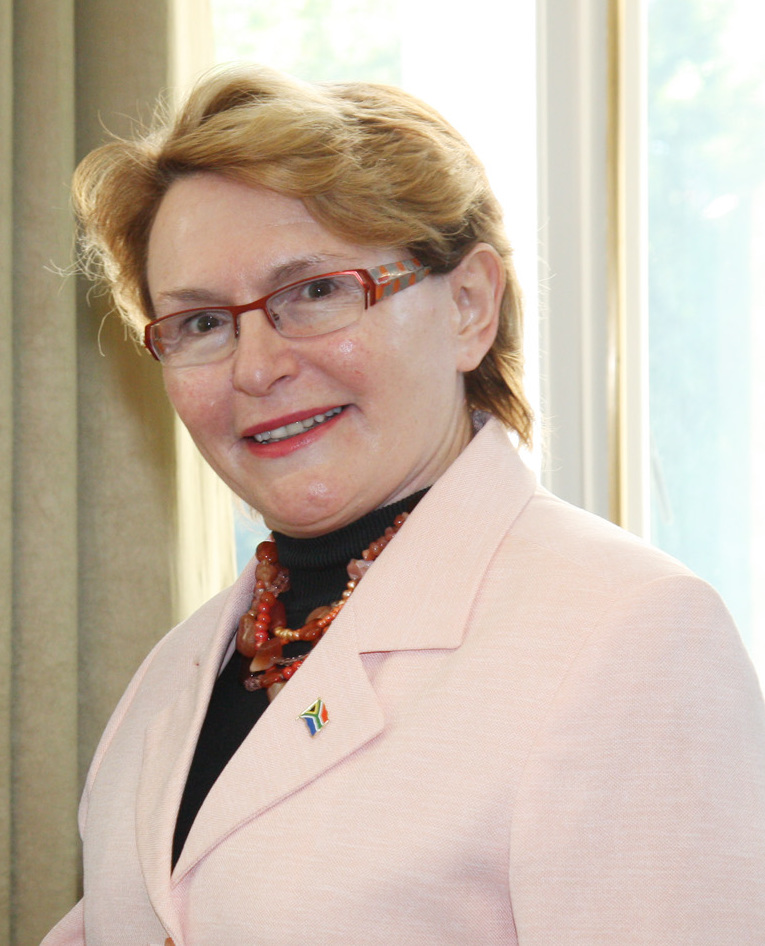

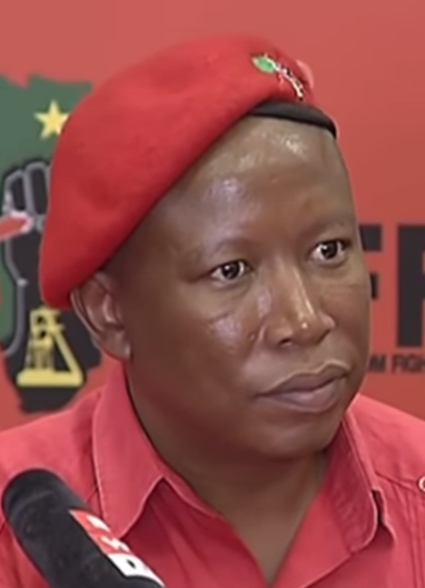

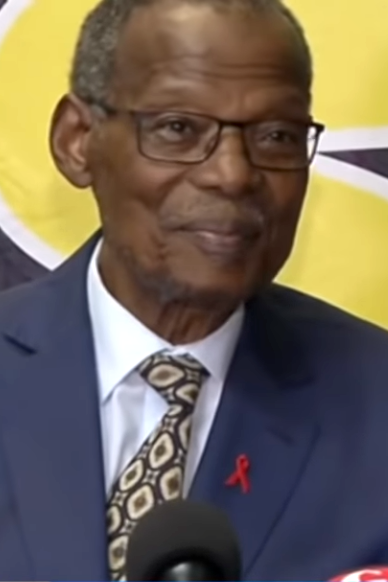

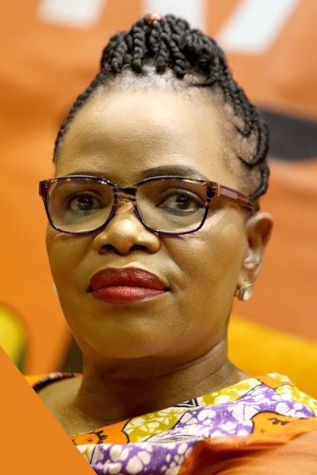

| | First party | Second party | Third party |
|---|---|---|---|
| Leader | Jacob Zuma | Helen Zille | Julius Malema |
| Party | ANC | DA | EFF |
| Last election | 65.90%, 264 seats | 16.66%, 67 seats | Did not exist |
| Seats won | 249 | 89 | 25 |
| Seat change | ▼15 | ▲22 | New party |
| Popular vote | 11,436,921 | 4,091,584 | 1,169,259 |
| Percentage | 62.15% | 22.23% | 6.35% |
| Swing | ▼3.75pp | ▲5.57pp | New party |
| | Fourth party | Fifth party | Sixth party |
| Leader | Mangosuthu Buthelezi | Zanele kaMagwaza-Msibi | Bantu Holomisa |
| Party | IFP | NFP | UDM |
| Last election | 4.55%, 18 seats | Did not exist | 0.85%, 4 seats |
| Seats won | 10 | 6 | 4 |
| Seat change | ▼8 | New party | Steady |
| Popular vote | 441,854 | 288,742 | 184,636 |
| Percentage | 2.40% | 1.57% | 1.00% |
| Swing | ▼2.15pp | New party | ▲0.15pp |
President before election
Jacob Zuma
ANC
Elected President
Jacob Zuma
ANC

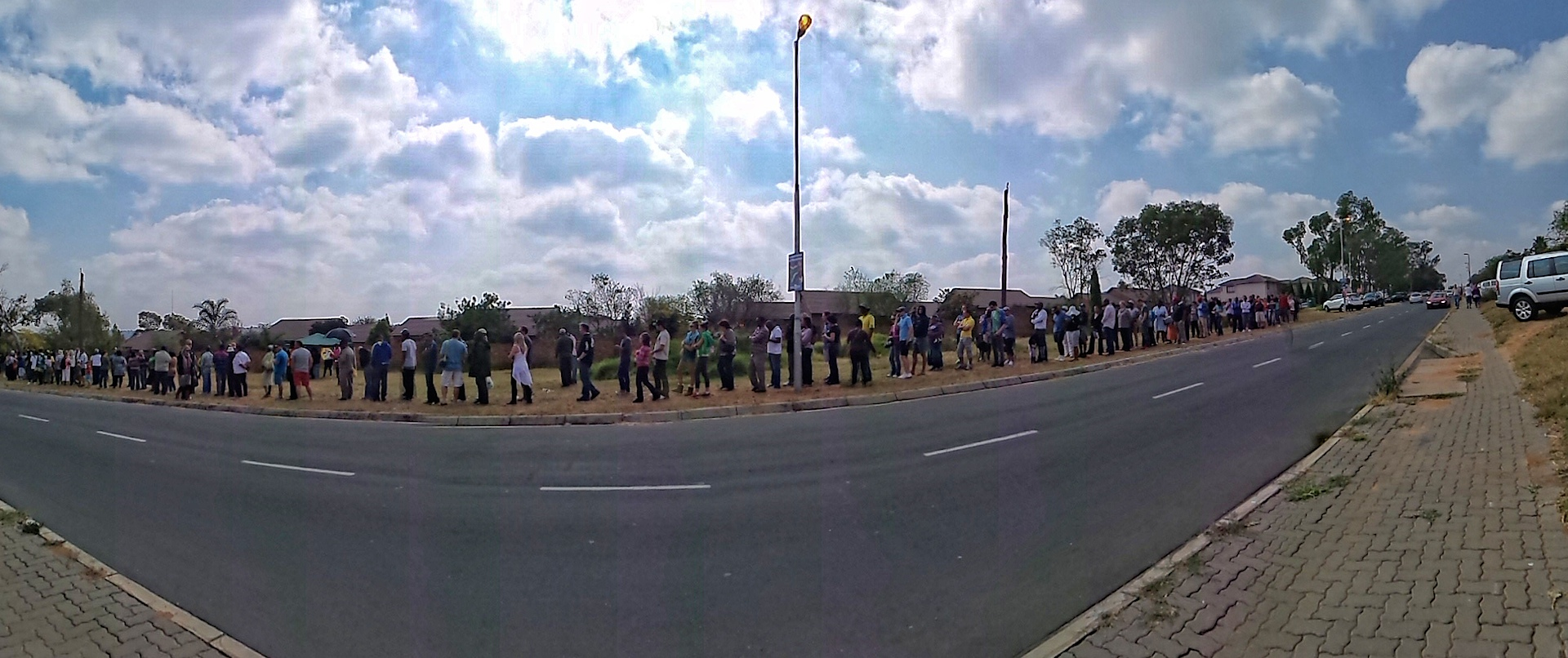
Voting queue in Midrand, Gauteng

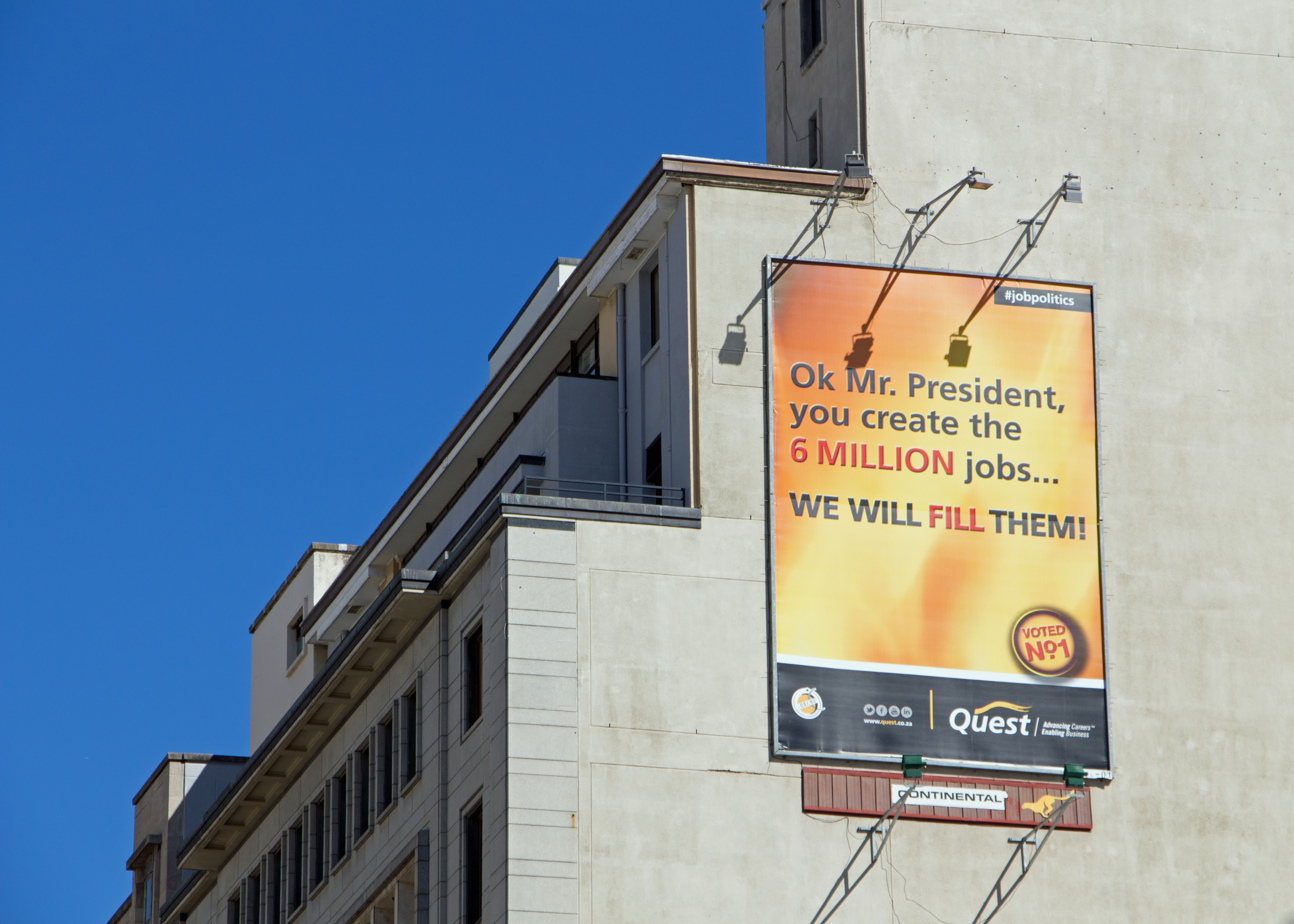
President Jacob Zuma promised to create 6 million new jobs if the ANC stays in power after the election.

General elections were held in South Africa on 7 May 2014, to elect a new National Assembly and new provincial legislatures in each province. It was the fifth election held in South Africa under conditions of universal adult suffrage since the end of the apartheid era in 1994, and also the first held since the death of Nelson Mandela. It was also the first time that South African expatriates were allowed to vote in a South African national election.

The National Assembly election was won by the African National Congress (ANC), but with a reduced majority of 62.1%, down from 65.9% in the 2009 election. The official opposition Democratic Alliance (DA) increased its share of the vote from 16.7% to 22.2%, while the newly formed Economic Freedom Fighters (EFF) obtained 6.4% of the vote.

Eight of the nine provincial legislatures were won by the ANC. The EFF obtained over 10% of the vote in Gauteng, Limpopo and North West, and beat the DA to second place in the last two. In the other six provinces won by the ANC, the DA obtained second place. This included KwaZulu-Natal, where the DA for the first time beat the Inkatha Freedom Party to second place. In the Western Cape, the only province not won by the ANC, the DA increased its majority from 51.5% to 59.4%.

== Electoral system ==
South Africa has a parliamentary system of government; the National Assembly consists of 400 members elected by proportional representation with a closed list approach. Two hundred members are elected from national party lists; the other 200 are elected from provincial party lists in each of the nine provinces. The President of South Africa was chosen by the National Assembly after the election.

The provincial legislatures, which vary in size from 30 to 80 members, are also elected by proportional representation with closed lists. The premiers of each province will be chosen by the winning majority in each provincial legislature.

The National Council of Provinces (NCOP) consists of 90 members, ten elected by each provincial legislature. The NCOP members will be elected by the provincial legislatures in proportion to the party makeup of the legislatures.

=== Changes to electoral legislation ===
On 26 November 2013 the Electoral Amendment Act, 2013, came into force. It allows South African citizens resident outside South Africa to register and vote in the election of the National Assembly.

A new regulation added in 2013 that was enforced for the first time on 7 May 2014 is the prohibition of photographing marked ballot papers, which aims to inhibit voter intimidation.

== Political parties ==
National Assembly after 2009 general election ANC DA COPE IFP others

The governing African National Congress (ANC), supported by its Tripartite Alliance with the Congress of South African Trade Unions (COSATU) and the South African Communist Party (SACP), have held a majority of the seats in the National Assembly since 1994. They were re-elected with increasing majorities in 1999 and 2004, and with a slight fall in its majority from 69% to 65.9% in 2009. The ANC is led by Jacob Zuma. In 2012, Zuma was re-elected to a second five-year term as President of the African National Congress, beating his only rival and deputy, Kgalema Motlanthe, by a wide margin. Cyril Ramaphosa was elected as Deputy President of the ANC, succeeding Motlanthe who had declined a second term after losing to Zuma.

The official opposition Democratic Alliance (DA) received 16.7% of the vote in 2009, up from 12.4% in 2004. The DA is led by Helen Zille, who was re-elected unopposed as Leader of the Democratic Alliance at the party's Federal Congress in Gauteng in 2012, while Lindiwe Mazibuko continued as Leader of the Opposition in Parliament. At provincial level, the DA has been in power in the Western Cape province since 2009, and came to power in several Western Cape municipalities in the 2011 municipal election. Traditionally, the DA was seen as a party rallying against apartheid laws, especially in the 1980s. However, one of its larger following bases are the whites in the south, especially after it absorbed the New National Party in 2001 (although NNP was disbanded in 2004).

Congress of the People (COPE), is led by Mosiuoa Lekota, although the leadership is disputed by Mbhazima Shilowa who continues to battle for recognition in the High Court. The party has been riven by infighting, causing it to lose much of its support and resulting in the formation of a splinter group, the United Congress. COPE won three seats in the National Assembly in the 2014 elections.

Mangosuthu Buthelezi remains leader of the Inkatha Freedom Party (IFP) despite a challenge by former IFP chairperson Zanele kaMagwaza-Msibi, who formed the National Freedom Party (NFP) after her feud with Buthelezi. The NFP and IFP split the vote in the Zulu-dominated KwaZulu-Natal province in the previous local government elections, each getting an even share of the vote, while the ANC continued to dominate the former IFP stronghold.

The Electoral Commission of South Africa (IEC) announced on 17 March that a record number of 33 parties had registered candidates for the national parliamentary election. In the provincial legislature elections the number of parties registering candidates, including four parties which had not yet paid the required deposits subject to a 24 March deadline, were:

- Western Cape – 26
- Gauteng – 22
- Limpopo – 20
- Eastern Cape – 18
- KwaZulu-Natal – 18
- Free State – 17
- Mpumalanga – 16
- Northern Cape – 16
- North West – 16

The electoral code of conduct was signed in Midrand, Gauteng on 19 March 2014. At the signing event, a draw was held in which the Freedom Front Plus won the right to appear at the top of the ballot paper.

=== New parties ===
Several parties contested the election for the first time and gained seats nationally and provincially:

- Expelled former ANC Youth League leader Julius Malema launched the Economic Freedom Fighters (EFF), taking a strong anti-ANC position within its ultra-left economic platform, such as calling for the expropriation of land without compensation and the nationalisation of South Africa's mines and the South African Reserve Bank. EFF won 25 seats in the assembly in the 2014 elections, taking the lead over older parties including COPE, FF+, and UDM.
- The National Freedom Party (NFP) was formed by former IFP chairperson Zanele kaMagwaza-Msibi.
- The African Independent Congress contested the election nationally for the first time.
- Agang South Africa was formed by anti-apartheid movement leader Mamphela Ramphele in 2013.

Other new parties were formed but did not obtain seats nationally:

- The Ubuntu Party is a South African political party founded by Michael Tellinger based on his principles of Ubuntu Contributionism. The party aims to introduce 100% employment by closing down the South African Reserve Bank and replacing it with a People's Bank that will grant interest-free home loans, fund massive public works campaign, and provide free electricity as Eskom is owned by the people of South Africa.
- The Workers and Socialist Party (WASP) was launched on Human Rights Day 2013 by leaders of the independent mineworkers' strike committees that led the strikes in the mining industry in 2012, before and after the Marikana massacre, and the Democratic Socialist Movement (DSM).
- As a result of the infighting in COPE, the United Congress splinter group was formed, led by Mluleki George.
- The new right-wing Front National (FN) party formed in December 2013 promotes separatism and Afrikaner self-determination. Hannes Engelbrecht is their leader and Dan Roodt is their deputy leader and spokesperson.
- The Patriotic Alliance was formed in 2013 by South African businessman, Kenny Kunene, and Kunene's former jail-mate, Gayton Mckenzie.

=== Alliances and defections ===
The Independent Democrats party, which won four seats and 0.9% of the national vote in 2009, merged with the Democratic Alliance before the 2014 general election.

On 17 December 2013, the South African Press Association reported that five opposition parties, namely COPE, the IFP, the African Christian Democratic Party, the United Christian Democratic Party and the Freedom Front Plus, had formed a coalition with 20 specific priorities. The parties in the coalition, named the Collective for Democracy (CD) and chaired by COPE leader Mosiuoa Lekota, will retain their own identity and contest the election individually. The IFP denied being part of the coalition, saying they were wary of forming such alliances given the confusion it had caused for their supporters in previous elections. Three days later, the 20th, COSATU's largest affiliate National Union of Metalworkers of South Africa (NUMSA) announced that they would not endorse the ANC or any other political party in 2014. NUMSA planned to establish a new working class collective along the lines of the defunct United Democratic Front, with the ultimate goal of forming a socialist party that will contest the 2019 general election. An opposing COSATU faction has obtained a legal opinion on removing NUMSA from COSATU, with significant implications for the country's labour and political landscape.

On 28 January 2014, the DA announced that Mamphela Ramphele had accepted an invitation to stand as its presidential candidate in the 2014 general election, and the DA and Agang South Africa were set to merge. On the 31st, Ramphele stated that she would not take up DA party membership and would remain the leader of Agang South Africa, resulting in confusion. On 2 February, Helen Zille stated that Ramphele had reneged on her agreement to stand as the DA's presidential candidate. Ramphele subsequently apologised for the reversal of her decision, saying that the timing was not right as the reaction to it had shown people were unable to overcome race-based party politics.

On 6 February, it was reported that COPE members who support Mbhazima Shilowa's planned to join the United Democratic Movement led by Bantu Holomisa which won four seats in the 2009 election. On 10 March, it was reported that COPE MP Nqaba Bhanga had joined the DA as an Eastern Cape parliamentary candidate, and three COPE MPs, namely Julie Kilian, Leonard Ramatlakane and Nic Koornhof were included on the ANC's list of national parliamentary candidates published on 11 March. On 28 April, it was reported that over 20 COPE MPs had defected to the ANC citing "poor political leadership". The only COPE member in the KwaZulu-Natal Legislature, Lucky Gabela, subsequently also defected to the ANC citing internal conflict.

On 11 March, Al Jama-ah and the Africa Muslim Party announced they would campaign together under the Al Jama-ah Community Party banner. The next day, it was reported that DA MP Beverley Abrahams had joined the ANC. On the 17th, Economic Freedom Fighters announced agreement to establish working relations with the Socialist Party of Azania (SOPA) and Black Consciousness Party (BCP), who would not independently stand for elections, but their candidates would be part of the EFF election 2014 candidates list as EFF members. EFF also had members of South Africa First (SAF) in the list who hold dual membership. Although SAF had not agreed to them being on the EFF list, its leadership collective endorsed the lists.

On the 20th, it was reported that DA MPs Lourie Bosman, Niekie van den Berg and Theo Coetzee were joining Freedom Front Plus on the party's national candidates list for the 2014 election. On the 30th, it was reported in the Sunday Times that DA MP Mpowele Swathe had joined the United Christian Democratic Party (UCDP) after his name appeared on election candidate lists for both parties.

=== Endorsements ===
On 2 May 2014, the Mail & Guardian newspaper "urged readers to oppose the ANC" for the first time, to dilute the ruling party's "overweening political power". The editorial cited the support of Cabinet ministers for the controversial proposed "secrecy law" and the ANC's "cynical response to the Nkandla scandal" among its reasons. A Financial Mail editorial published on the same day, cited unemployment and changes in the government's administration and policies which impacted business negatively. It stated "the ANC does not get our endorsement this time" and "our vote goes to the DA". An editorial published in The Economist the following day, cited unemployment and an increase in corruption under Zuma's leadership in particular and stated that the ANC and Zuma "no longer deserve to rule" and "The DA deserves to be endorsed." Also on the 2nd, Abahlali baseMjondolo, a social movement representing shack dwellers which previously supported the No Land! No House! No Vote! election boycott campaign, announced its provincial endorsement of the DA in KwaZulu-Natal for the election as a tactical vote against the ANC.

== Voter registration ==
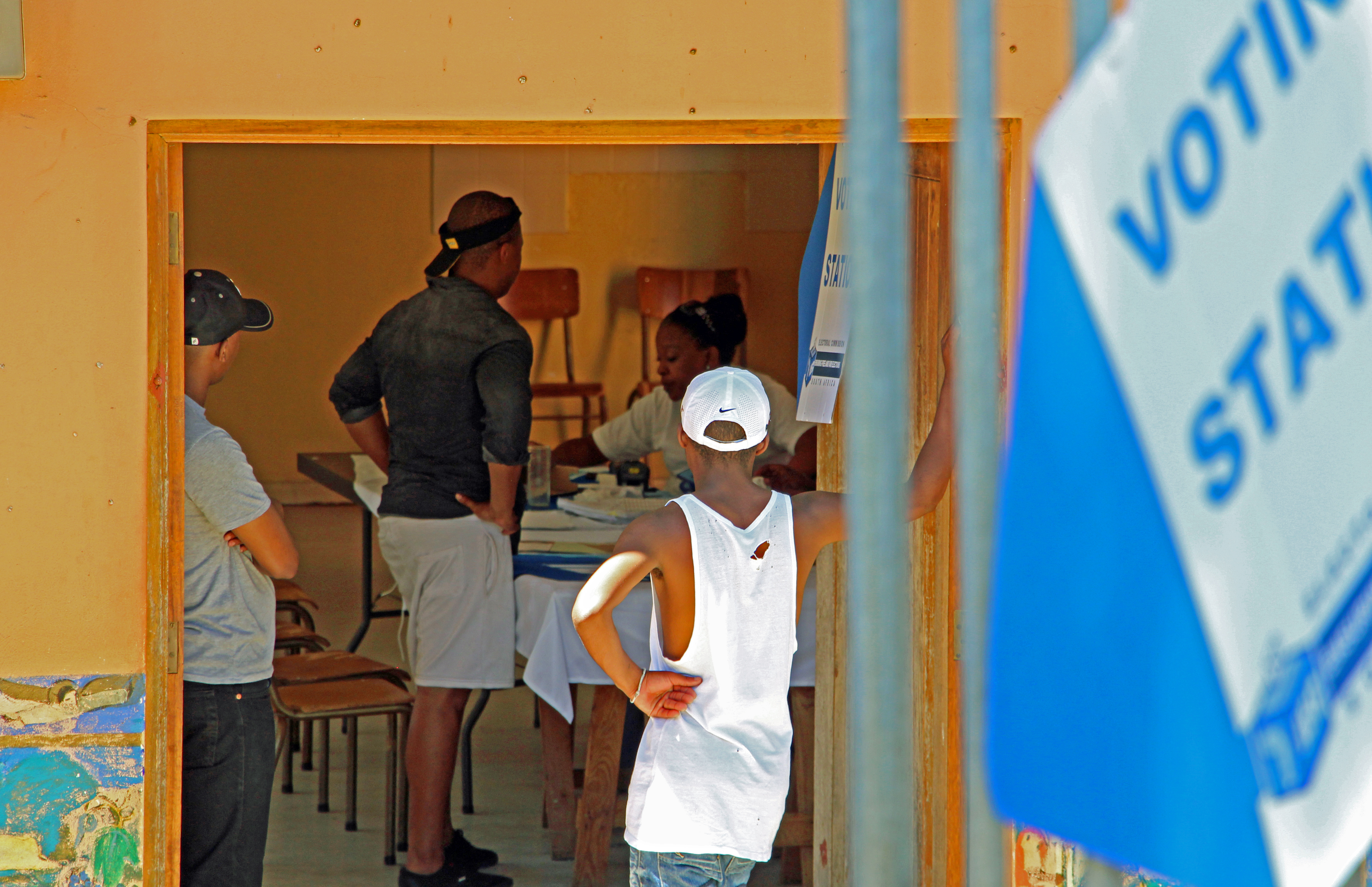
Born-free generation registering to vote for the first time in the 2014 general election

=== Local voters ===
On the weekends of 9–10 November 2013 and 8–9 February 2014 all voting stations were opened for new voters to register and for those who moved residence to re-register in their new voting district. The presidency of South Africa urged voters who had missed the voting station registration weekends to register at an IEC office during office hours. Presidential spokesperson, Mac Maharaj, said that voters were allowed to register to vote until the election date is published in a government gazette, after which the voters' roll is closed. Approximately 5.5 million people in total visited voting stations, including between 1 and 2 million new voters. This increased the number of registered voters to 25.3 million, representing 80.5% of the 31.4 million people eligible to vote in the country. South Africans who were born after the 1994 general election, known as the born-free generation, and are aged 18 or older were eligible to vote for the first time.

=== International voters ===
South Africans living abroad could register to vote at any South African Embassy, High Commission or Consulate-General from 9 January 2014 to 7 February 2014. South Africans living abroad who wished to vote had to notify the IEC of their intention to vote by 12 March 2014. The weekends of 18–19 January and 25–26 January were made registration weekends to accommodate voters who were unable to register during business hours. Over 26,000 voters were registered to vote abroad by the time of the election.

A total of 26,701 voters were registered to vote abroad, with the highest numbers of voters being registered to vote in London (9,863), Dubai (1,539) and Canberra (1,243) with other stations totalling 14,056 registered voters.

== Opinion polling ==
=== National ballot ===
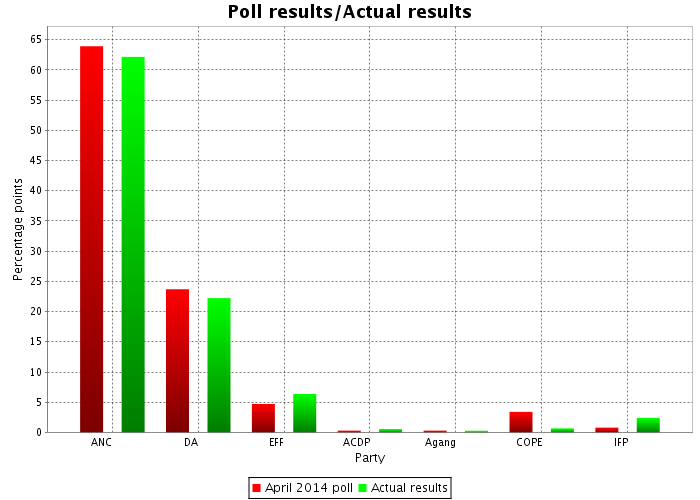
April 2014 poll compared to election results. Ipsos/Sunday Times April 2014 poll Actual election results

According to an internal poll conducted by the DA with American pollster Stan Greenberg in March–April 2014, the ANC would get 59% of the vote, the DA 26% and the EFF 8%.

In an Ipsos survey of 1,000 registered ANC members conducted for the Sunday Times in December 2013, 55% of respondents said they will vote for the ANC again, 5% said they will vote for the DA, 6% said they will vote for other parties, and the remaining 34% said they did not know or preferred not to answer.

According to the results of an Ipsos Pulse of the People survey published in February 2014, the DA is the most multi-racial party while the ANC has 96% black supporters and the EFF has 99% black supporters, relative to 76% black survey respondents. The age profile of ANC supporters closely resembles the age profile of voters, while DA supporters are slightly older overall and EFF supporters are significantly younger overall.

Africa Check, a non-profit organisation that checks facts in claims made about Africa, and the Centre for the Study of Democracy have criticised polls by market research companies as unscientific. Africa Check warned that some polls are intentionally misleading and some are essentially conjecture.

| Date | Polling organisation | ANC | DA | EFF | ACDP | Agang | COPE | IFP | Others | Abstention/Don't know/No answer |
|---|---|---|---|---|---|---|---|---|---|---|
| Oct/Nov 2013 | Ipsos; Pulse of the People | 53% | 18% | 4% | 1% | 1% | 1% | 1% | 2% | 19% |
| Oct/Nov 2013 (Note: Figures in this row are based on the moderate voter turnout scenario without assigning the 6% undecided voters to parties.) | Ipsos; Pulse of the People | 64% | 19% | 4% | 1% | 1% | 1% | 2% | 2% | 6% |
| Feb/Mar 2014 (Note: Figures in this row are based on the moderate voter turnout scenario.) | Ipsos; Pulse of the People | 63.4% | 22.9% | 4.7% | 0.9% | – | 1.2% | 1.9% | 5.0% | N/A |
| Feb/Mar 2014 (Note: Figures in this row are based on the moderate voter turnout scenario without assigning the 7.4% undecided voters to parties.) | Ipsos/Sunday Times | 61.9% | 20.5% | 3.4% | | | | | | 7.4% |
| Feb/Mar 2014 (Note: Figures in this row are based on the moderate voter turnout scenario with the 7.4% undecided voters assigned to parties based on other survey answers.) | Ipsos/Sunday Times | 66.1% | 22.9% | 3.7% | ~1% | 0.4% | 0.7% | 1.4% | 3.8% | N/A |
| Mar/Apr 2014 (Note: Figures in this row are based on an average voter turnout of 74.5% with undecided voters assigned to parties based on other survey answers.) | Ipsos/Sunday Times | 65.5% | 23.1% | 4.0% | 0.8% | 0.0% | 1.3% | 2.8% | 2.5% | N/A |
| Apr 2014 | Ipsos/Sunday Times | 63.9% | 23.7% | 4.7% | 0.3% | 0.3% | 3.4% | 0.8% | 2.9% | N/A |

=== Provincial ballot ===
The Ipsos Pulse of the People survey undertaken in October and November 2013 showed that a number of provinces would be closely contested. The ANC will continue to dominate in the Eastern Cape, Limpopo, North West, Mpumalanga, KwaZulu-Natal and Free State. The DA will keep the Western Cape while control of the Northern Cape and Gauteng will be contested between the ANC and DA, with other parties holding the balance of power, so coalitions may be decisive. In Limpopo and North West the EFF could become the official opposition.

Ipsos Pulse of the People poll October/November 2013
| Party | EC % | L % | NW % | M % | KZN % | FS % | G % | NC % | WC % |
|---|---|---|---|---|---|---|---|---|---|
| ANC | 71.4 | 67.2 | 63.5 | 63.4 | 56.6 | 55.4 | 45.5 | 42.7 | 27 |
| DA | 8.6 | 7.4 | 6.4 | 9.1 | 11.2 | 24.9 | 22.6 | 45.9 | 54.1 |
| EFF | 4.6 | 11.4 | 12.7 | 6.8 | 0.3 | 2 | 7.3 | 1 | 1.8 |
| ACDP | - | 0.5 | 3.1 | 5.0 | 0.1 | 0.7 | 2.2 | - | 0.6 |
| Agang SA | 1 | 3 | - | 4.6 | 0.5 | - | 3 | - | 1.2 |
| COPE | 2.5 | 0.4 | - | 0.8 | 0.4 | 7.3 | 2.2 | 5 | 1.6 |
| IFP | - | 1 | 1.9 | 0.8 | 9.8 | - | 0.2 | - | - |
| Africa Muslim Party | - | - | - | - | 0.2 | - | 0.4 | - | 0.2 |
| AZAPO | 0.3 | 0.7 | - | 0.7 | 0.2 | - | 0.4 | - | 0.3 |
| VF+ | 0.2 | 0.7 | 1.1 | - | - | - | 1.8 | - | 1.6 |
| MF | - | - | - | - | 0.9 | - | - | - | - |
| New Labour Party | - | - | 2 | - | - | - | - | - | - |
| PAC | - | 0.5 | - | - | - | - | 0.4 | - | - |
| UCDP | - | - | - | - | - | - | - | - | 0.4 |
| UDM | 1 | - | - | - | 0.2 | - | 0.2 | - | 0.2 |
| NFP | - | - | - | - | 1.5 | - | 0.1 | - | 0.2 |
| Other | 0.7 | - | - | 5.7 | 1.3 | - | 3.5 | - | 0.4 |
| Not voting in election | 1.6 | 2.8 | 4.7 | - | 3.8 | - | 2.4 | - | 1.3 |
| Did not answer survey | 4.4 | 1.2 | 2.6 | 1.7 | 11 | - | 3.6 | 1.6 | 6.2 |
| Don't know | 2.7 | 3.2 | 1.1 | 1.4 | 2 | 9.5 | 3.8 | 2.2 | 2.5 |
| Not registered to vote | 1 | - | 0.9 | - | - | 0.2 | 0.4 | 1.6 | 0.4 |
Source: IPSOS Archived (6 October 2014)

The Ipsos/Sunday Times survey undertaken in February and March 2014 showed that the ANC enjoyed majority support in all provinces except the Western Cape, where the DA retains majority support. DA support followed that of the ANC in all other provinces except for the North West, where the EFF came in second place.

== Campaign ==
=== Debates ===
The South African Broadcasting Corporation (SABC) broadcast weekly election debates from February to May 2014. They were broadcast between 6pm and 7pm on SABC 1 and streamed live on the SABC's YouTube channel.

The following debates took place:

| Date | Topic |
|---|---|
| 23 February 2014 | Free and fair elections in a highly charged atmosphere of violent protests |
| 2 March 2014 | Youth & unemployment |
| 9 March 2014 | Education |
| 16 March 2014 | Can the newcomers make a difference? |
| 23 March 2014 | Poverty in the land of plenty |
| 30 March 2014 | Defeating racism; building a non-racial South Africa |
| 6 April 2014 | Land |
| 13 April 2014 | Accountability & corruption |
| 20 April 2014 | What's wrong with our municipalities / Are municipalities working for the people? |
| 27 April 2014 | Liberation movements |
| 4 May 2014 | Crime |

=== Controversies ===
In January 2014, Helen Zille announced that the DA would be marching to Luthuli House, the ANC's headquarters, saying, "We are taking the fight to Luthuli House to highlight the failure of (President) Jacob Zuma's ANC to cut corruption and create jobs". Zille said that 6000 people would be marching, each one representing 1000 South Africans who would benefit from the 6 million jobs that the DA promised to create if it came to power. The planned date of the march was 4 February 2014, but this was later changed to the 12th due to logistical problems. The Johannesburg Metro Police Department (JMPD) initially denied the DA's application to march but the decision was overturned on 3 February 2014 when the DA took the matter to the Johannesburg High Court. On the 11th, it was reported that the JMPD had set the march perimeters to prevent the DA from marching to Luthuli House. JMPD spokesperson, Chief Superintendent Wayne Minnaar said, "The protest march by the DA... has been prohibited on the grounds that there would be a security risk to protesters." The DA announced that the march would now end at Beyers Naude Square. On the day of the march, an application to stop the DA march filed by the ANC to the South Gauteng High Court was dismissed.

The march ended early after the DA was confronted by ANC supporters 40 minutes into the march. Stones and petrol bombs were thrown by ANC supporters at police trying to calm the situation.

ICASA ordered that this photograph of a police officer firing rubber bullets at unarmed residents during a protest in Bekkersdal over an ANC election campaign be removed from a DA election campaign television advert.

On 13 March, violence erupted in the Bekkersdal township in Gauteng, the scene of violent service delivery protests in 2013. Residents staged a protest over a planned ANC campaign in the area, barricading the streets with rocks and burning tyres and pelting ANC officials and police vehicles with stones. Police responded to the volatile situation by firing rubber bullets at residents.

Shortly after Public Protector Thuli Madonsela's final report on security upgrades to President Jacob Zuma's private residence at Nkandla was published on 19 March, the DA sent a bulk text message to Gauteng voters which reads: "The Nkandla report shows how Zuma stole your money to build his R246m home. Vote DA on 7 May to beat corruption. Together for change." The ANC submitted an urgent application to the South Gauteng High Court to stop distribution of the text message on the grounds that it violated the Electoral Act. On 4 April, the court ruled that the wording of the message was fair comment and dismissed the ANC's application with costs. The ANC was granted leave to appeal the decision. On 6 May, the Electoral Court ruled that the DA must retract the text message, finding that it wrongly targeted Zuma personally instead of the systematic failures highlighted in Madonsela's report. The court case was ultimately won by the DA when the Constitutional Court set aside the Electoral Court ruling on 19 January 2015.

On 5 April, a marquee, a stage, a sound system and chairs set up for an EFF rally in Thokoza were petrol bombed in the early hours of the morning. EFF spokesperson, Mbuyiseni Mdlozi said that the EFF suspected ANC members were responsible for the sabotage. ANC spokesperson Jackson Mthembu denied the allegations, saying "We don't do such things."

The following day, the DA accused the ANC of abusing state resources after the South African Social Security Agency (SASSA) was seen giving out blankets and toiletries at an ANC rally in Parys. ANC spokesperson Khusela Sangoni-Khawe denied the accusation, saying that the ANC did not know SASSA would be at the rally.

Four days later, the DA submitted a complaint to the Independent Communications Authority of South Africa (ICASA) about censorship by the public broadcaster after the SABC informed the DA it would not continue broadcasting a DA television advert titled "ANC Ayisafani", meaning "the ANC's not the same", and five DA radio adverts aired on 8 and 9 April 2014. According to the DA's Mmusi Maimane, who appears in the television advert, the SABC banned all DA adverts from 11 public radio stations as well as the television advert. ICASA announced that it would hold public hearings on the matter on Thursday the 17th, 6 days after the DA lodged their complaint. Following the DA's announcement that it would submit an urgent application to the South Gauteng High Court requesting a ruling on the adverts before the long Easter weekend commencing Good Friday, the day after ICASA's proposed public hearing date, the ICASA hearings commenced 2 days earlier than originally scheduled. On the day after the hearing, the ban was lifted temporarily as the SABC had failed to provide reasons for the ban during the ICASA hearings and requested more time to prepare a response. The DA also objected to the SABC not allowing the national official opposition party to participate in a televised election debate on land reform on SABC in the first 2 weeks of April. On 25 April, ICASA upheld the SABC's ban on the television advert finding that it contravened ICASA's regulations on party election broadcasts. ICASA ordered that a photograph taken by The Citizen photographer Alaister Russell of a police officer firing rubber bullets at unarmed residents during the March 2014 Bekkersdal protest be removed from the advert as "the police should not be seen as a threat to the community". In the advert, Maimane says "We've seen a police force killing our own people" while the photograph is shown on the screen. The South African Police Service had earlier submitted a complaint to ICASA that this footage would incite violence against police officers.

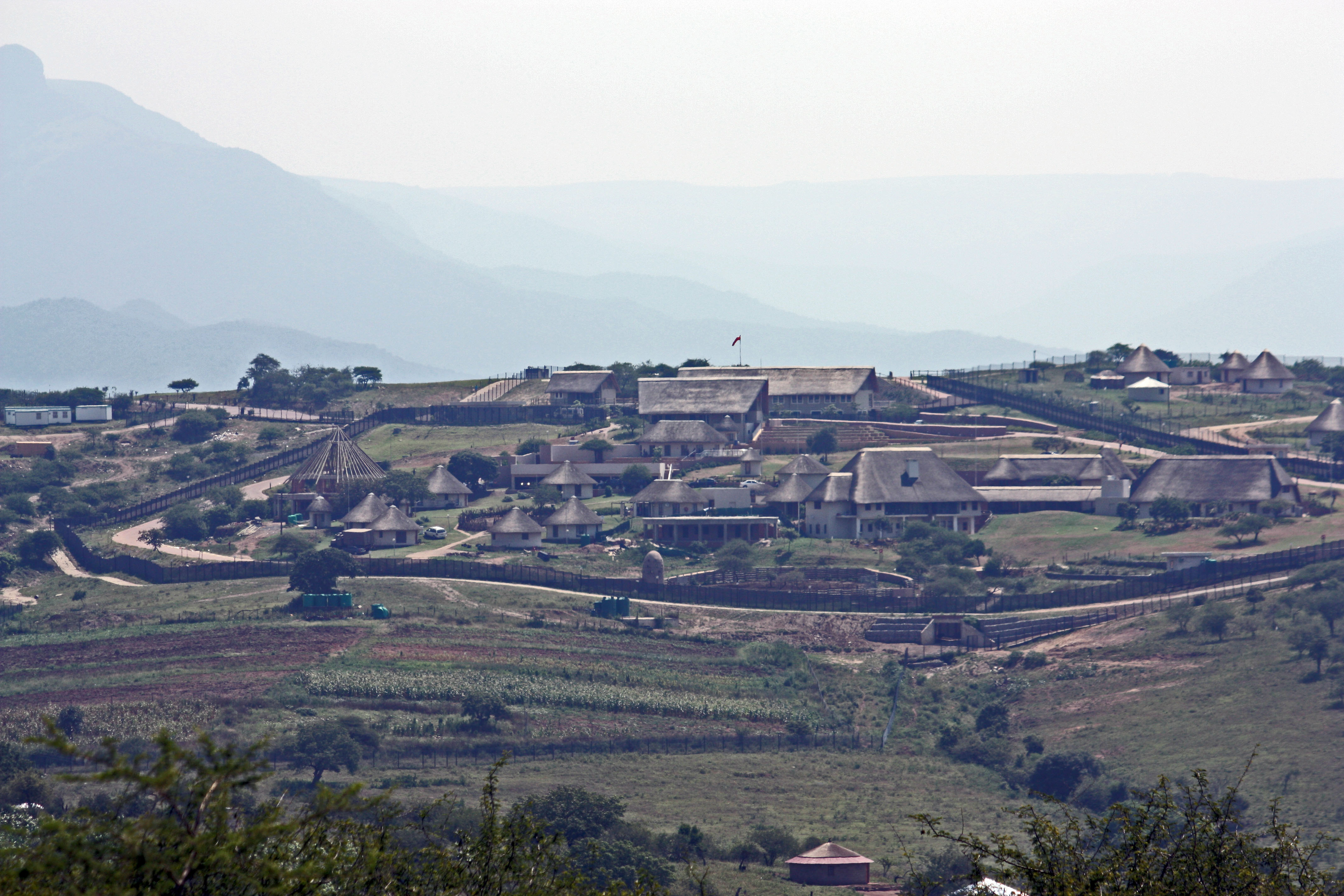
Opposition party election campaigns have targeted corruption and public spending on President Jacob Zuma's private residence at Nkandla.

On 15 April 2014, a protest campaign against corruption with the slogan "Vukani! Sidikwe! (Wake up! We are Fed up!) Vote No", supported by over 100 ANC veterans, was launched by former government ministers Ronnie Kasrils and Nozizwe Madlala-Routledge. The IEC has requested a legal opinion on whether the campaign contravenes the Electoral Act. The campaign urges ANC supporters to either spoil their votes or vote for a smaller party. Archbishop Emeritus Desmond Tutu welcomed the campaign, and human rights activist and cleric Barney Pityana describes it as "a campaign to bring rationality, order, morality and decency back into our electoral system" in a Mail & Guardian opinion piece.

On the same day, United Democratic Movement leader Bantu Holomisa announced that lawyers acting on behalf of several opposition parties concerned about the credibility of the general election would approach the Electoral Court following the IEC chairperson Pansy Tlakula's refusal to agree to their call for her resignation. Public Protector Thuli Madonsela found Tlakula had been involved in building procurement irregularities in a report published in August 2013, and a subsequent National Treasury review published in March 2014 supported her findings. Five days before the election, the Electoral Court postponed the inquiry into her conduct until 2 June 2014, as it would not be able to rule on the matter before the 7 May election date. On 18 June, the Electoral Court recommended Tlakula's removal from office due to financial misconduct. Tlakula resigned as IEC chairperson on 1 September after an unsuccessful application to the Constitutional Court for leave to appeal the Electoral Court ruling.

On 22 April, the EFF also lodged a complaint with ICASA after the SABC banned an EFF election campaign television advert titled "Now is the time for economic freedom" that was due to be aired on 2 occasions, 2 days before the complaint was lodged and on the day the complaint was lodged. Four days after the complaint was lodged, ICASA upheld the SABC's ban on the advert. ICASA found that wording in the advert about physically destroying contentious e-tolls in Gauteng could incite violence and therefore contravened ICASA's regulations on party election broadcasts. The EFF advert had also highlighted police brutality, using interviews and photographs related to the Marikana massacre and the same photograph of the March 2014 Bekkersdal protest that ICASA ordered removed from the DA advert.

Nine days before the election, a Parliamentary committee set up to consider Zuma's response to Madonsela's final Nkandla report was referred to the next Parliament to be formed after the election, citing insufficient time available before the 7 May election date.

Two days before the election, Zuma spoke about the Nkandla scandal at a media briefing, saying it was only an issue with the media and the opposition, "the bright people ... very clever people", and not an issue with ANC voters.

On the day before the election, it was reported that the National Society for the Prevention of Cruelty to Animals (NSPCA) had ambushed election campaign posters by attaching matching NSPCA posters to the bottom of them. NSPCA spokesperson, Christine Kuch said that the NSPCA campaign hoped to get more political parties to include animal rights in their manifestos.

=== Cost ===
Due to the secretive nature of political funding in South Africa generally little public information exists on both sources of political funding of South African political parties and the nature of their expenses however the ruling ANC did declare the 2014 elections to be the "most expensive election" it had ever fought to date. According to leaked sources within the ANC the 2014 elections cost the ANC over R429-million. Some of the ANC's expenses include R118 million on campaign T-shirts, R17-million for the manifesto launch in Mbombela, R83.7-million in advertising (including R27-million for posters and billboards), R21 million for the victory rally, and R67-million on volunteers.

== Voting ==
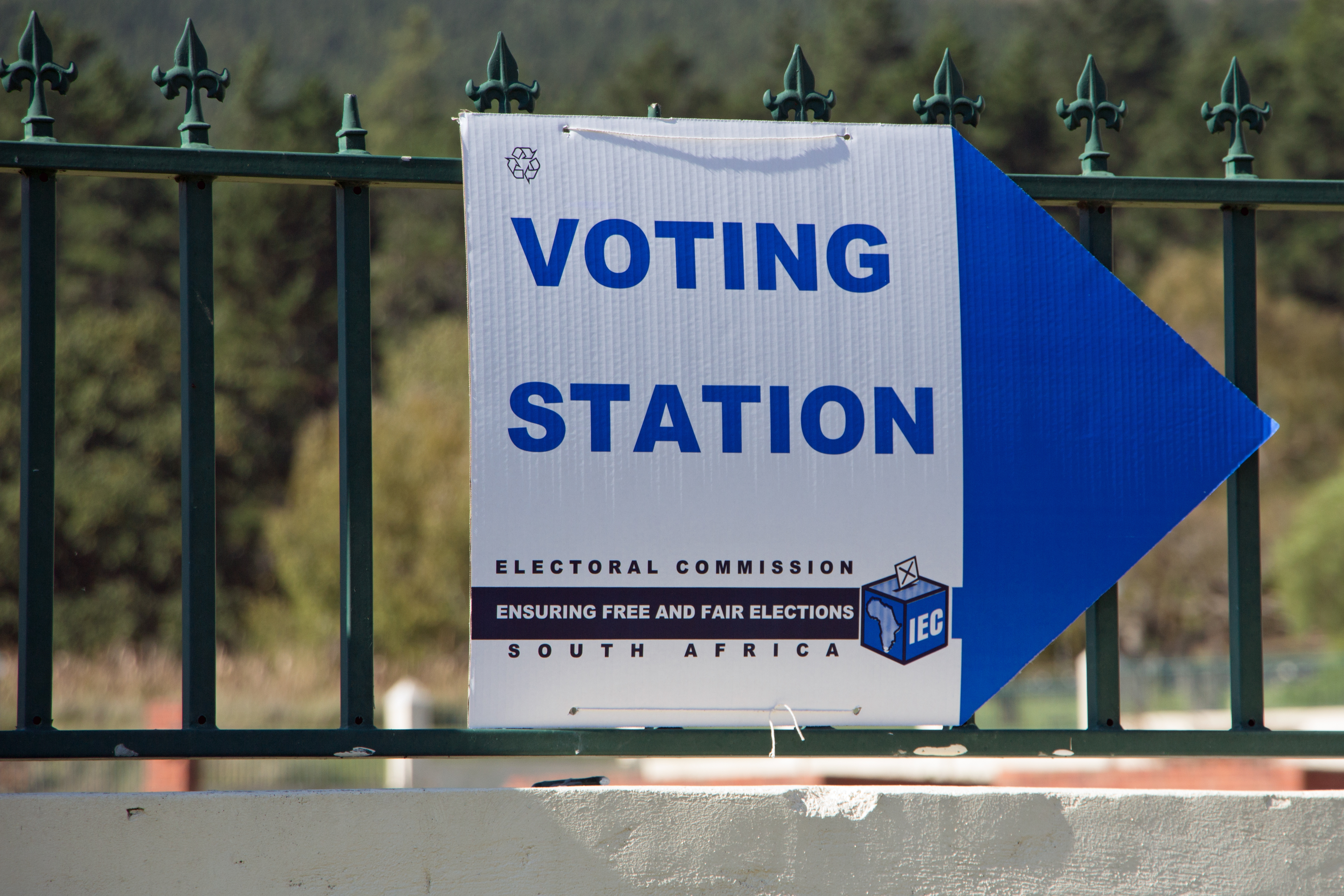
Voting station sign on voting day

Proof of voting

=== International special votes ===
Over 26,000 South Africans registered to participate in the national election in the international voting phase, which took place at 116 international voting stations on 30 April 2014. The last international voting station in Los Angeles closed at 6 am SAST on 1 May 2014. All international votes were couriered to South Africa, combined into a single voting district and counted on 7 May 2014.

The IEC had budgeted R2 million to cover the cost of couriering the ballot papers from overseas.

=== Local special votes ===
The local special vote phase of the election took place on 5–6 May 2014, accommodating who are physically infirm, disabled or pregnant or were unable to vote at their voting station on the polling day. Former President Thabo Mbeki cast a special vote as he was attending a World Economic Forum meeting in Nigeria on polling day.

=== Voting day ===
Voting took place relatively smoothly at 22,264 voting stations in South Africa. It was reported that 2,449, or 11%, of the voting stations opened later than the scheduled opening time of 7 am. All voting stations were operational by 11 am. Voting stations closed and counting began at 9 pm.

A newly designed braille template was used for the first time in a National election, allowing blind voters to vote independently for the first time. In previous elections, blind voters had to communicate their choice of party to a voting official, who then filled in a ballot sheet on their behalf.

==== Incidents ====
On voting day 97 people were arrested for election-related offences, primarily voter intimidation. A number of voters ignored the new legislation prohibiting photographs of marked ballot papers, including local celebrity DJ Sbu and footballer Andile Jali.

The chair of the Independent Electoral Commission, Pansy Tlakula, made it plain that electioneering was forbidden on the day of the election itself. 'No political events can take place on voting day,’ she told reporters. 'Campaigning finished at midnight last night.' In the townships surrounding Cape Town it was evident that this ruling was extensively and openly flouted. As the day drew to a close, cavalcades of cars, with loudspeakers blaring out party songs and supporters waving flags from the windows, could be seen touring up and down the streets. Outside polling stations crowds, some more than a hundred strong, dressed in party colours and waving ANC flags, could be seen dancing less than a metre from the long lines of men and women waiting patiently to cast their votes. When this was drawn to the attention of the police and the representatives of the Electoral Commission at the stations they either shrugged their shoulders or said they did not have the resources to deal with these violations of the regulations.

A voting station in Alexandra, Gauteng was temporarily closed after an argument broke out between ANC and EFF members when the EFF accused the ANC of vote-rigging. The voting station was opened later that afternoon.

An ANC supporter was fatally shot in KwaZulu-Natal by an IFP supporter near a voting station. Dumisani Nxumalo, a 28-year-old from KwaDukuza was charged with the murder. The Durban Regional Court saw his bail application on 26 June 2014 where it was alleged that the shooting took place while IFP supporters were walking past an ANC tent. The case was set to continue in July.

== Results ==
Winner by ward of the National Assembly election; a lighter shade indicates a plurality win without a majority. African National Congress indicated by green, Democratic Alliance by blue, Inkatha Freedom Party by red, National Freedom Party by orange and other parties by grey.

The Electoral Commission decided to exclude the votes from one voting station in Tickeyline, near Tzaneen in Limpopo, because staff at the voting station were attacked at the close of voting and the security of the ballot could not be assured. The final results were announced on 10 May.

=== Parliament ===
==== National Assembly ====
National Assembly after 2014 general election ANC DA EFF IFP Other

| Party | Votes | % | Seats | +/– |
|---|---|---|---|---|
| African National Congress | 11,436,921 | 62.15 | 249 | –15 |
| Democratic Alliance | 4,091,584 | 22.23 | 89 | +18 |
| Economic Freedom Fighters | 1,169,259 | 6.35 | 25 | New |
| Inkatha Freedom Party | 441,854 | 2.40 | 10 | –8 |
| National Freedom Party | 288,742 | 1.57 | 6 | New |
| United Democratic Movement | 184,636 | 1.00 | 4 | 0 |
| Freedom Front Plus | 165,715 | 0.90 | 4 | 0 |
| Congress of the People | 123,235 | 0.67 | 3 | –27 |
| African Christian Democratic Party | 104,039 | 0.57 | 3 | 0 |
| African Independent Congress | 97,642 | 0.53 | 3 | New |
| Agang South Africa | 52,350 | 0.28 | 2 | New |
| Pan Africanist Congress | 37,784 | 0.21 | 1 | 0 |
| African People's Convention | 30,676 | 0.17 | 1 | 0 |
| Al Jama-ah | 25,976 | 0.14 | 0 | 0 |
| Minority Front | 22,589 | 0.12 | 0 | –1 |
| United Christian Democratic Party | 21,744 | 0.12 | 0 | –2 |
| Azanian People's Organisation | 20,421 | 0.11 | 0 | –1 |
| Bushbuckridge Residents Association | 15,271 | 0.08 | 0 | New |
| Independent Civic Organisation | 14,472 | 0.08 | 0 | New |
| Patriotic Alliance | 13,263 | 0.07 | 0 | New |
| Workers and Socialist Party | 8,331 | 0.05 | 0 | New |
| Ubuntu Party | 8,234 | 0.04 | 0 | New |
| Kingdom Governance Movement | 6,408 | 0.03 | 0 | New |
| Front National | 5,138 | 0.03 | 0 | New |
| Keep It Straight and Simple Party | 4,294 | 0.02 | 0 | 0 |
| Pan Africanist Movement | 3,815 | 0.02 | 0 | 0 |
| First Nation Liberation Alliance | 3,297 | 0.02 | 0 | New |
| United Congress | 3,136 | 0.02 | 0 | New |
| Peoples Alliance | 1,671 | 0.01 | 0 | New |
| Total | 18,402,497 | 100.00 | 400 | 0 |
| Valid votes | 18,402,497 | 98.65 | | |
| Invalid/blank votes | 252,274 | 1.35 | | |
| Total votes | 18,654,771 | 100.00 | | |
| Registered voters/turnout | 25,388,082 | 73.48 | | |
Source: Election Resources

==== National Council of Provinces ====
The National Council of Provinces (NCOP) consists of 90 members, ten nominated by each provincial legislature, in proportion to the party membership of the provincial legislature. Each provincial delegation consists of six permanent delegates, who are nominated for a term that lasts until a new provincial legislature is elected, and four special delegates. One of the special delegates is the province's Premier, or another member of the provincial legislature designated by the Premier, while the other three special delegates are designated ad hoc by the provincial legislature.

| Party | Delegate type | Province | | | | | | | | | Total | |
| Party | Delegate type | EC | FS | G | KZN | L | M | NW | NC | WC | Total | |
|---|---|---|---|---|---|---|---|---|---|---|---|---|
| African National Congress | Permanent | 4 | 4 | 3 | 4 | 4 | 4 | 4 | 4 | 2 | 33 | 60 |
| African National Congress | Special | 3 | 3 | 2 | 3 | 4 | 4 | 3 | 3 | 2 | 27 | 60 |
| Democratic Alliance | Permanent | 1 | 1 | 2 | 1 | 1 | 1 | 1 | 1 | 4 | 13 | 20 |
| Democratic Alliance | Special | 1 | 1 | 2 | | | | | 1 | 2 | 7 | 20 |
| Economic Freedom Fighters | Permanent | | 1 | 1 | | 1 | 1 | 1 | 1 | | 6 | 7 |
| Economic Freedom Fighters | Special | | | | | | | 1 | | | 1 | 7 |
| Inkatha Freedom Party | Permanent | | | | 1 | | | | | | 1 | |
| National Freedom Party | Special | | | | 1 | | | | | | 1 | |
| United Democratic Movement | Permanent | 1 | | | | | | | | | 1 | |
| Total | | 10 | 10 | 10 | 10 | 10 | 10 | 10 | 10 | 10 | 90 | |

=== Provincial legislatures ===
In the provincial results of the election, the ANC won a majority in all the provincial legislatures except for the Western Cape, in which it came second to the DA. The DA came second in all other provinces except for Limpopo and the North West, in which it came third after the EFF.

==== Eastern Cape ====
Leading party by ward in the Eastern Cape provincial election African National Congress Democratic Alliance United Democratic Movement

| Party | Votes | % | Seats | +/– |
|---|---|---|---|---|
| African National Congress | 1,528,345 | 70.09 | 45 | +1 |
| Democratic Alliance | 353,316 | 16.20 | 10 | +4 |
| United Democratic Movement | 134,280 | 6.16 | 4 | +1 |
| Economic Freedom Fighters | 75,776 | 3.48 | 2 | New |
| Congress of the People | 26,129 | 1.20 | 1 | –8 |
| African Independent Congress | 16,786 | 0.77 | 1 | 0 |
| Pan Africanist Congress | 9,691 | 0.44 | 0 | 0 |
| African Christian Democratic Party | 7,291 | 0.33 | 0 | 0 |
| Freedom Front Plus | 6,818 | 0.31 | 0 | 0 |
| African People's Convention | 5,000 | 0.23 | 0 | 0 |
| Kingdom Governance Movement | 3,932 | 0.18 | 0 | New |
| National Freedom Party | 3,472 | 0.16 | 0 | New |
| Azanian People's Organisation | 2,509 | 0.12 | 0 | 0 |
| Agang South Africa | 2,372 | 0.11 | 0 | New |
| United Congress | 1,406 | 0.06 | 0 | New |
| Inkatha Freedom Party | 1,388 | 0.06 | 0 | 0 |
| United Christian Democratic Party | 1,194 | 0.05 | 0 | 0 |
| Patriotic Movement of South Africa | 759 | 0.03 | 0 | 0 |
| Total | 2,180,464 | 100.00 | 63 | 0 |
| Valid votes | 2,180,464 | 98.52 | | |
| Invalid/blank votes | 32,657 | 1.48 | | |
| Total votes | 2,213,121 | 100.00 | | |
| Registered voters/turnout | 3,240,059 | 68.30 | | |
Source: Election Reosources

==== Free State ====
Leading party by ward in the Free State provincial election African National Congress Democratic Alliance

| Party | Votes | % | Seats | +/– |
|---|---|---|---|---|
| African National Congress | 708,720 | 69.85 | 22 | 0 |
| Democratic Alliance | 164,672 | 16.23 | 5 | +2 |
| Economic Freedom Fighters | 82,674 | 8.15 | 2 | New |
| Freedom Front Plus | 21,339 | 2.10 | 1 | 0 |
| Congress of the People | 16,516 | 1.63 | 0 | –4 |
| African Christian Democratic Party | 5,150 | 0.51 | 0 | 0 |
| African People's Convention | 3,198 | 0.32 | 0 | 0 |
| Pan Africanist Congress | 2,133 | 0.21 | 0 | 0 |
| United Democratic Movement | 2,127 | 0.21 | 0 | 0 |
| Agang South Africa | 2,065 | 0.20 | 0 | New |
| Azanian People's Organisation | 1,581 | 0.16 | 0 | New |
| United Christian Democratic Party | 1,139 | 0.11 | 0 | 0 |
| Inkatha Freedom Party | 1,124 | 0.11 | 0 | 0 |
| National Freedom Party | 1,115 | 0.11 | 0 | New |
| Patriotic Alliance | 651 | 0.06 | 0 | New |
| Independent Civic Organisation | 459 | 0.05 | 0 | New |
| Total | 1,014,663 | 100.00 | 30 | 0 |
| Valid votes | 1,014,663 | 98.58 | | |
| Invalid/blank votes | 14,634 | 1.42 | | |
| Total votes | 1,029,297 | 100.00 | | |
| Registered voters/turnout | 1,449,488 | 71.01 | | |
Source: Election Resources

==== Gauteng ====
Leading party by ward in the Gauteng provincial election African National Congress Democratic Alliance

| Party | Votes | % | Seats | +/– |
|---|---|---|---|---|
| African National Congress | 2,348,564 | 53.59 | 40 | –7 |
| Democratic Alliance | 1,349,001 | 30.78 | 23 | +6 |
| Economic Freedom Fighters | 451,318 | 10.30 | 8 | New |
| Freedom Front Plus | 52,436 | 1.20 | 1 | 0 |
| Inkatha Freedom Party | 34,240 | 0.78 | 1 | 0 |
| African Christian Democratic Party | 27,196 | 0.62 | 0 | –1 |
| Congress of the People | 21,652 | 0.49 | 0 | –6 |
| National Freedom Party | 20,733 | 0.47 | 0 | New |
| United Democratic Movement | 19,486 | 0.44 | 0 | 0 |
| Agang South Africa | 18,258 | 0.42 | 0 | New |
| Pan Africanist Congress | 11,241 | 0.26 | 0 | 0 |
| African People's Convention | 7,187 | 0.16 | 0 | 0 |
| Azanian People's Organisation | 5,110 | 0.12 | 0 | 0 |
| United Christian Democratic Party | 3,641 | 0.08 | 0 | 0 |
| Minority Front | 3,237 | 0.07 | 0 | New |
| Front National | 2,285 | 0.05 | 0 | New |
| Workers and Socialist Party | 1,988 | 0.05 | 0 | New |
| Patriotic Alliance | 1,811 | 0.04 | 0 | New |
| Independent Civic Organisation | 974 | 0.02 | 0 | New |
| Kingdom Governance Movement | 815 | 0.02 | 0 | New |
| Lekgotla for Democracy Advancement | 695 | 0.02 | 0 | New |
| Merafong Civic Association | 295 | 0.01 | 0 | New |
| Total | 4,382,163 | 100.00 | 73 | 0 |
| Valid votes | 4,382,163 | 99.04 | | |
| Invalid/blank votes | 42,261 | 0.96 | | |
| Total votes | 4,424,424 | 100.00 | | |
| Registered voters/turnout | 6,063,739 | 72.97 | | |
Source: Election Resources

==== KwaZulu-Natal ====
Leading party by ward in the KwaZulu-Natal provincial election African National Congress Democratic Alliance Inkatha Freedom Party National Freedom Party

| Party | Votes | % | Seats | +/– |
|---|---|---|---|---|
| African National Congress | 2,475,041 | 64.52 | 52 | +1 |
| Democratic Alliance | 489,430 | 12.76 | 10 | +3 |
| Inkatha Freedom Party | 416,496 | 10.86 | 9 | –9 |
| National Freedom Party | 280,425 | 7.31 | 6 | New |
| Economic Freedom Fighters | 70,823 | 1.85 | 2 | New |
| Minority Front | 38,960 | 1.02 | 1 | –1 |
| African Christian Democratic Party | 16,803 | 0.44 | 0 | –1 |
| Freedom Front Plus | 7,695 | 0.20 | 0 | 0 |
| African People's Convention | 7,040 | 0.18 | 0 | 0 |
| United Democratic Movement | 6,632 | 0.17 | 0 | 0 |
| Congress of the People | 5,968 | 0.16 | 0 | –1 |
| Azanian People's Organisation | 5,873 | 0.15 | 0 | New |
| Truly Alliance | 4,082 | 0.11 | 0 | New |
| Pan Africanist Congress | 2,930 | 0.08 | 0 | 0 |
| KwaZulu-Natal Transport Alliance | 2,796 | 0.07 | 0 | New |
| United Christian Democratic Party | 2,186 | 0.06 | 0 | 0 |
| Kingdom Governance Movement | 1,903 | 0.05 | 0 | New |
| Ubumbano Lwesizwe Sabangoni | 926 | 0.02 | 0 | New |
| Total | 3,836,009 | 100.00 | 80 | 0 |
| Valid votes | 3,836,009 | 98.67 | | |
| Invalid/blank votes | 51,831 | 1.33 | | |
| Total votes | 3,887,840 | 100.00 | | |
| Registered voters/turnout | 5,117,131 | 75.98 | | |
Source: Election Resources

==== Limpopo ====
Leading party by ward in the Limpopo provincial election African National Congress Democratic Alliance

| Party | Votes | % | Seats | +/– |
|---|---|---|---|---|
| African National Congress | 1,149,348 | 78.60 | 39 | –4 |
| Economic Freedom Fighters | 156,982 | 10.74 | 6 | New |
| Democratic Alliance | 94,724 | 6.48 | 3 | +1 |
| Congress of the People | 12,573 | 0.86 | 1 | –3 |
| Freedom Front Plus | 10,102 | 0.69 | 0 | 0 |
| African Christian Democratic Party | 6,988 | 0.48 | 0 | 0 |
| Agang South Africa | 5,197 | 0.36 | 0 | New |
| African People's Convention | 5,085 | 0.35 | 0 | 0 |
| Pan Africanist Congress | 4,266 | 0.29 | 0 | 0 |
| United Democratic Movement | 3,920 | 0.27 | 0 | 0 |
| Azanian People's Organisation | 3,851 | 0.26 | 0 | 0 |
| Ximoko Party | 3,044 | 0.21 | 0 | 0 |
| Workers and Socialist Party | 1,222 | 0.08 | 0 | New |
| Inkatha Freedom Party | 1,219 | 0.08 | 0 | 0 |
| South African Maintenance and Estate Beneficiaries Association | 1,105 | 0.08 | 0 | New |
| United Christian Democratic Party | 850 | 0.06 | 0 | 0 |
| National Freedom Party | 586 | 0.04 | 0 | New |
| Lekgotla for Democracy Advancement | 556 | 0.04 | 0 | New |
| Unemployed Movement SA | 349 | 0.02 | 0 | New |
| Merafong Civic Association | 219 | 0.01 | 0 | New |
| Total | 1,462,186 | 100.00 | 49 | 0 |
| Valid votes | 1,462,186 | 98.76 | | |
| Invalid/blank votes | 18,409 | 1.24 | | |
| Total votes | 1,480,595 | 100.00 | | |
| Registered voters/turnout | 2,438,280 | 60.72 | | |
Source: Election Resources

==== Mpumalanga ====
Leading party by ward in the Mpumalanga provincial election African National Congress Democratic Alliance Bushbuckridge Residents Association

| Party | Votes | % | Seats | +/– |
|---|---|---|---|---|
| African National Congress | 1,045,409 | 78.23 | 24 | –3 |
| Democratic Alliance | 138,990 | 10.40 | 3 | +1 |
| Economic Freedom Fighters | 83,589 | 6.26 | 2 | New |
| Bushbuckridge Residents Association | 15,368 | 1.15 | 1 | New |
| Freedom Front Plus | 11,018 | 0.82 | 0 | 0 |
| National Freedom Party | 10,066 | 0.75 | 0 | New |
| African People's Convention | 5,940 | 0.44 | 0 | 0 |
| African Christian Democratic Party | 5,324 | 0.40 | 0 | 0 |
| Congress of the People | 4,288 | 0.32 | 0 | –1 |
| Sindawonye Progressive Party | 4,244 | 0.32 | 0 | 0 |
| Inkatha Freedom Party | 3,481 | 0.26 | 0 | 0 |
| Pan Africanist Congress | 3,109 | 0.23 | 0 | 0 |
| Agang South Africa | 1,705 | 0.13 | 0 | New |
| United Democratic Movement | 1,701 | 0.13 | 0 | 0 |
| Azanian People's Organisation | 1,235 | 0.09 | 0 | 0 |
| United Christian Democratic Party | 792 | 0.06 | 0 | 0 |
| Total | 1,336,259 | 100.00 | 30 | 0 |
| Valid votes | 1,336,259 | 98.57 | | |
| Invalid/blank votes | 19,333 | 1.43 | | |
| Total votes | 1,355,592 | 100.00 | | |
| Registered voters/turnout | 1,860,834 | 72.85 | | |
Source: Election Resources

==== North West ====
Leading party by ward in the North West provincial election African National Congress Democratic Alliance Economic Freedom Fighters

| Party | Votes | % | Seats | +/– |
|---|---|---|---|---|
| African National Congress | 733,490 | 67.39 | 23 | –2 |
| Economic Freedom Fighters | 143,765 | 13.21 | 5 | New |
| Democratic Alliance | 138,521 | 12.73 | 4 | +1 |
| Freedom Front Plus | 18,746 | 1.72 | 1 | +1 |
| United Christian Democratic Party | 12,811 | 1.18 | 0 | –2 |
| Congress of the People | 8,692 | 0.80 | 0 | –3 |
| United Democratic Movement | 9,615 | 0.88 | 0 | 0 |
| African Christian Democratic Party | 5,728 | 0.53 | 0 | 0 |
| Agang South Africa | 4,736 | 0.44 | 0 | new |
| African People's Convention | 4,398 | 0.40 | 0 | 0 |
| Azanian People's Organisation | 1,796 | 0.17 | 0 | 0 |
| National Freedom Party | 1,582 | 0.15 | 0 | new |
| Inkatha Freedom Party | 1,496 | 0.14 | 0 | 0 |
| Pan Africanist Congress | 1,473 | 0.14 | 0 | 0 |
| Workers and Socialist Party | 939 | 0.09 | 0 | new |
| South African Political Party | 662 | 0.06 | 0 | 0 |
| Total | 1,088,450 | 100.00 | 33 | 0 |
| Valid votes | 1,088,450 | 98.32 | | |
| Invalid/blank votes | 18,629 | 1.68 | | |
| Total votes | 1,107,079 | 100.00 | | |
| Registered voters/turnout | 1,669,349 | 66.32 | | |
Source: Election Resources

==== Northern Cape ====
Leading party by ward in the Northern Cape provincial election African National Congress Democratic Alliance

| Party | Votes | % | Seats | +/– |
|---|---|---|---|---|
| African National Congress | 272,053 | 64.40 | 20 | +1 |
| Democratic Alliance | 100,916 | 23.89 | 7 | +1 |
| Economic Freedom Fighters | 20,951 | 4.96 | 2 | New |
| Congress of the People | 15,218 | 3.60 | 1 | –4 |
| Freedom Front Plus | 4,600 | 1.09 | 0 | 0 |
| African Christian Democratic Party | 2,421 | 0.57 | 0 | 0 |
| United Christian Democratic Party | 1,542 | 0.37 | 0 | 0 |
| African People's Convention | 1,191 | 0.28 | 0 | 0 |
| Azanian People's Organisation | 1,062 | 0.25 | 0 | 0 |
| Patriotic Alliance | 584 | 0.14 | 0 | New |
| Independent Civic Organisation | 499 | 0.12 | 0 | New |
| Pan Africanist Congress | 460 | 0.11 | 0 | 0 |
| United Democratic Movement | 366 | 0.09 | 0 | 0 |
| Inkatha Freedom Party | 239 | 0.06 | 0 | 0 |
| First Nation Liberation Alliance | 194 | 0.05 | 0 | New |
| National Freedom Party | 139 | 0.03 | 0 | New |
| Total | 422,435 | 100.00 | 30 | 0 |
| Valid votes | 422,435 | 98.58 | | |
| Invalid/blank votes | 6,106 | 1.42 | | |
| Total votes | 428,541 | 100.00 | | |
| Registered voters/turnout | 601,080 | 71.30 | | |
Source: Election Resources

==== Western Cape ====
Leading party by ward in the Western Cape provincial election African National Congress Democratic Alliance Independent Civic Organisation of South Africa

| Party | Votes | % | Seats | +/– |
|---|---|---|---|---|
| Democratic Alliance | 1,259,645 | 59.38 | 26 | +2 |
| African National Congress | 697,664 | 32.89 | 14 | 0 |
| Economic Freedom Fighters | 44,762 | 2.11 | 1 | New |
| African Christian Democratic Party | 21,696 | 1.02 | 1 | 0 |
| Al Jama-ah | 13,182 | 0.62 | 0 | 0 |
| Congress of the People | 12,520 | 0.59 | 0 | –3 |
| Independent Civic Organisation | 11,949 | 0.56 | 0 | New |
| Freedom Front Plus | 11,587 | 0.55 | 0 | 0 |
| United Democratic Movement | 10,199 | 0.48 | 0 | 0 |
| Patriotic Alliance | 8,510 | 0.40 | 0 | New |
| African Independent Congress | 6,508 | 0.31 | 0 | New |
| Agang South Africa | 6,398 | 0.30 | 0 | New |
| Pan Africanist Congress | 3,591 | 0.17 | 0 | 0 |
| National Party | 2,694 | 0.13 | 0 | 0 |
| African People's Convention | 1,291 | 0.06 | 0 | 0 |
| African National Party | 1,249 | 0.06 | 0 | New |
| Indigenous Peoples Organisation | 1,180 | 0.06 | 0 | New |
| United Christian Democratic Party | 1,158 | 0.05 | 0 | 0 |
| Inkatha Freedom Party | 1,078 | 0.05 | 0 | 0 |
| Azanian People's Organisation | 844 | 0.04 | 0 | 0 |
| National Freedom Party | 763 | 0.04 | 0 | New |
| South African Progressive Civic Organisation | 642 | 0.03 | 0 | New |
| First Nation Liberation Alliance | 635 | 0.03 | 0 | New |
| Kingdom Governance Movement | 490 | 0.02 | 0 | New |
| Sibanye Civic Association | 478 | 0.02 | 0 | New |
| Peoples Alliance | 440 | 0.02 | 0 | New |
| Total | 2,121,153 | 100.00 | 42 | 0 |
| Valid votes | 2,121,153 | 99.12 | | |
| Invalid/blank votes | 18,937 | 0.88 | | |
| Total votes | 2,140,090 | 100.00 | | |
| Registered voters/turnout | 2,941,333 | 72.76 | | |
Source: Election Resources

== Reactions ==
=== Domestic ===
==== Political ====
African National Congress supporters gathered in Johannesburg to celebrate the party's results. Jacob Zuma dedicated the ANC's victory to Nelson Mandela. The ANC requested an in-depth analysis of election results from its provincial election team in Gauteng. ANC spokesperson Nkenke Kekana said the ANC was concerned about its drop in support in the 2014 elections. Democratic Alliance leader, Helen Zille, published a press release thanking every South African who voted for the DA. She said that voters had responded positively to the DA's campaign, saying, "We can look back proudly on what was undoubtedly the biggest and best campaign the DA has ever run." Economic Freedom Fighters commander-in-chief Julius Malema dedicated the EFF's result to the girls kidnapped in the Chibok schoolgirl kidnapping, saying, "It looks impossible, but we have proved what looks impossible is possible." EFF supporters gathered at Innes Free Park in Sandton to celebrate the results. Inkatha Freedom Party leader Mangosuthu Buthelezi said in a statement that despite low estimations in the Ipsos polls, the IFP managed to retain its fourth-place position in the elections. Buthelezi thanked all South Africans who voted for the IFP and stated that he was proud to serve South Africa. Agang SA: Mamphela Ramphele congratulate all parties and candidates who contested the election. She expressed disappointment at Agang SA's poor performance, but stated that she was proud that her party achieved parliamentary representation despite it only being formed several months prior to the election. African Christian Democratic Party MP Steve Swart expressed disappointment that the ACDP did not grow its share of the vote, but was grateful that they were able to retain their support compared to other parties in the election.

=== International ===
==== Recognised states ====
===== Africa =====
Angolan President José Eduardo dos Santos congratulated President Jacob Zuma and said that the election results reaffirmed the wish of South Africans to maintain the status quo. President of Botswana, Ian Khama said "We extend our congratulations to President Jacob Zuma and his party the ANC for their re-election." Nigerian President Goodluck Jonathan congratulated President Zuma and the ANC on their "resounding victory", describing it as a well-deserved tribute to Nelson Mandela. President of Seychelles, James Michel congratulated Jacob Zuma on his re-election, saying, "It is a mark of confidence, in the leadership that you have provided the people of South Africa and the undeniable strong determination and conviction in making South Africa a beacon of hope and success in Africa and in the world." He also stated he was proud of the partnership between their two countries and he hoped that they would continue to improve. Swaziland's ambassador to South Africa Senzangakhona Dlamini told President Zuma "Swaziland agrees that South Africa has a good story to tell as you celebrate 20 years of democracy". Zimbabwean President Robert Mugabe congratulated President Jacob Zuma on the ANC's "resounding victory" and commended South Africans for their "peaceful and exemplary conduct" during the election.

===== Americas =====
United States Secretary of State, John Kerry, congratulated South Africa on the elections in a press release when the voting had concluded. Once the results had been released, President Barack Obama congratulated Jacob Zuma in a telephone conversation.

===== Europe =====
The President of Belarus, Alexander Lukashenko sent a congratulatory message to Zuma congratulating him on his re-election. It read, "I hope that joint efforts will help us enhance bilateral cooperation for the benefit of the two countries." United Kingdom Foreign Secretary William Hague congratulated South Africa for successful elections and stated that the UK would continue to have good relations with South Africa.

===== Middle East and Asia =====
King of Bahrain, Hamad bin Isa Al Khalifa congratulated Zuma on his re-election for a second term of governance. Chinese Foreign Ministry spokesperson, Hua Chunying, congratulated South Africa on the elections at a press briefing. She said that China had paid great attention to these elections and that "China will continue to view relations with South Africa as a priority in its foreign policy." Indian president, Pranab Mukherjee congratulated Jacob Zuma on his re-election and said that he hoped bilateral relations between India and South Africa would grow from "strength to strength." King Abdullah of Jordan congratulated Zuma and expressed his commitment to improve relations between Jordan and South Africa. Kazakhstan ambassador to South Africa Talgat Kaliyev congratulated President Zuma on "the successful elections". President of Nepal, Ram Baran Yadav congratulated Zuma on his re-elections and wished peace and prosperity for South Africans under Zuma's leadership. Sri Lankan president Mahinda Rajapaksa congratulated the ANC on their victory, saying this showed the popularity of "the party of Nelson Mandela, Oliver Tambo and others."

==== States with limited recognition ====
Barotseland Administrator General, Afumba Mombotwa congratulated Zuma for his victory, saying the result of the election showed that South African citizens had "spoken their minds." President of the Saharawi Arab Democratic Republic, Mohamed Abdelaziz conveyed his best wishes to Zuma and the ANC on behalf of his people and government.

=== Supranational organisations ===
United Nations Secretary-General Ban Ki-moon applauded the high voter turnout at the elections and South African citizens' willingness to participate in the democratic system their country fought for. African Union observer mission Deputy Head Ibrahim Fall reported that the elections were fair and all parties obeyed electoral rules. He said, "The general political and electoral environment was generally peaceful across the country, with voters being able to exercise their right to vote." Southern African Development Community Electoral Observation Mission said in a statement "Guided by the SADC Principles and Guidelines Governing Democratic Elections, SEOM concludes that the 2014 National and Provincial Elections were peaceful, free, fair, transparent and credible, reflecting the will of the people of South Africa." Commonwealth of Nations Election Observer Mission chairperson, Nana Akufo-Addo said that the South African elections should be an example for the continent of Africa, saying, "So when we see a process like this which seems to have been a commendable process taking place in South Africa, we see there is a tremendous boost to the spread of democracy in the rest of the continent."

=== Media ===
BBC's Andrew Harding said that there was no massive change in the elections compared to previous years and Voice of America said that the increase in representation for opposition parties will provide "great political entertainment".

== Aftermath ==
=== Economic ===
On 8 May 2014, the South African Rand grew 1.2% against the US dollar, reaching its highest level in four months. The following day, the Rand was still trading strongly as preliminary results showed that the ANC would defeat the EFF, whose left-wing policies worried investors.

=== Political ===
On 7 June 2014, the Presidency issued a statement saying that Jacob Zuma had been admitted to hospital for tests following "a demanding election and transition programme," and that doctors were satisfied with his condition. Zuma was advised to rest for the next few days. Following internal conflict within Agang SA, party leader Mamphela Ramphele announced her withdrawal from politics on the next day.

=== Controversies ===
==== Dumped votes ====
On 8 May, it was reported that dumped ballots from the Lynnwood voting district in Pretoria had been found. According to reports, a majority of the dumped votes were for the Democratic Alliance. Helen Zille expressed her concerns over the incident to reporters at the IEC national operations centre, saying, "This is certainly not conducive to public confidence in a free and fair election." However, DA party agents from the voting station confirmed that the votes had already been counted. Party agent for the DA, Jordan Griffith tweeted, "I was the party agent there, those votes were counted and recorded. .signed off. The IEC in their laziness dumped them" The IEC stated that it was looking into the incident.

==== Violence in Alexandra ====
On 8 May violence broke out in Alexandra, Gauteng after residents found two ballot boxes dumped in the area. An IEC office was damaged.

IFP officials stormed an ANC office in Alexandra and held ANC members hostage after the IFP had realised that they had lost all previous IFP voting districts to the ANC. The ANC office was situated in a multi-purpose centre along with IEC and IFP offices.

Rubber bullets and stun grenades were used on 9 May to disperse a violent protest by 300 to 400 people demanding the release of the suspects arrested the previous day. Members of the South African National Defence Force were called in to bring the situation under control. 44 People were arrested for public violence during the protest.

== See also ==
- List of political parties in South Africa
