= Democratic Socialist Movement =

Democratic Socialist Movement may refer to:

- Democratic socialism
- Democratic Socialist Movement (Nigeria)
- Democratic Socialist Movement (South Africa)
