= Movement for a Socialist Alternative (Nigeria) =

Political party in Nigeria

Movement for a Socialist Alternative (MSA)
- General Secretary: Dagga Tolar
- Founded: 2020; 6 years ago
- Split from: Democratic Socialist Movement
- Preceded by: Democratic Socialist Movement
- Headquarters: 11, Olayiwola Street, Abule Egba, Lagos
- Newspaper: Solidarity
- Ideology: Communism; Marxism; Revolutionary socialism Trotskyism
- Political position: Far-left
- National affiliation: Socialist Party of Nigeria
- International affiliation: International Socialist Alternative
- Colors: Red

Website
- socialistmovementng.org

The Movement for a Socialist Alternative (Nigeria) (MSA) is a Trotskyist political party in Nigeria. It is affiliated to International Socialist Alternative.

== Campaigns ==
MSA have campaigned for the renationalization of the electricity supply industry under democratic control through elected representatives of the working people and community. This demand arose from increases in both prices and power outages. This led on to campaigning alongside the Nigeria Labour Congress and Trade Union Congress in the nationwide protest against the Nigerian Government over the increase in the price of petrol and electricity tariff. Oladimeji Macaulay, a member of MSA, speaking for a coalition of civil society groups under the umbrella of Nigerians Against Bad Policies said "no amount of intimidation and harassment by security operatives would stop them from embarking on the mass protest." They have also called for the disbandment of Special Anti-Robbery Squad (SARS) and justice and compensation for the families of the people killed extra-judicially by the police and the bringing to trial of all involved in such killings. They also demand the democratic control by the mass of the working people, via their unions and organisations in the management and conduct of all police affairs and engagement with members of the public.

=== Socialist Party of Nigeria ===
The DSM before the split launched an initiative for the Socialist Party of Nigeria which was inaugurated on 16 November 2013 in Lagos.
