= United Congress (South Africa) =

Political party in South Africa

- Secretary-General: Nolitha Zoki
- Founder: Mluleki George
- Founded: 2013
- Split from: Congress of the People
- Ideology: Socialism
- Political position: Left-wing
- Colours: Emerald Green
- National Assembly seats: 0 / 400

The United Congress is a South African political party formed by Mluleki George in December 2013. George left the Congress of the People (COPE), accusing its leader Mosiuoa Lekota of ruling the party improperly.

The party formed 13 branches in Mbhashe, and registered to contest a number of by-elections in the area, held in January 2014. The party failed to win a seat, with a best of 6% in one ward, while in another ward the party failed to attract a single vote.

== Election results ==
=== National elections ===
Election	Votes	%	Seats
2014	3,136	0.02%	0

==== Provincial elections ====
Election	Eastern Cape		Free State		Gauteng		Kwazulu-Natal		Limpopo		Mpumalanga		North-West		Northern Cape		Western Cape	
Election	%	Seats	%	Seats	%	Seats	%	Seats	%	Seats	%	Seats	%	Seats	%	Seats	%	Seats
2014	0.06%	0/63	–	–	–	–	–	–	–	–	–	–	–	–	–	–	–	–
