= International Socialist Alternative =

International association of Trotskyist political parties

- Predecessor: Committee for a Workers' International (1974)
- Formation: 1 February 2020
- Type: Association of Trotskyist political parties
- Region served: Worldwide
- Leader: Collective leadership
- Website: internationalsocialist.net

International Socialist Alternative (ISA) is an international association of Trotskyist political parties.

ISA was founded by sections on one side of a split in the Committee for a Workers' International (CWI).

== History ==
In 2018 and 2019, a dispute within the Committee for a Workers' International developed around the questions of socialism and identity politics.

One group founded the "In Defence of a Working Class and Trotskyist CWI" (IDWCTCWI) faction, which considers itself a continuance of the original CWI, using the same name.

A second group, in support of the majority of the CWI's International Executive Committee, later renamed itself International Socialist Alternative and also considers itself the continuance of the original CWI.

The Internationalist Standpoint (IS) split from International Socialist Alternative in 2022.

In 2026, a group of members in the Seattle Branch associated with the Faction for Revolutionary Leadership inside the Socialist Alternative (the United States Section of ISA) were expelled. In a letter to Cosmonaut, these members declared their intent to form International Socialist Alternative (Revolutionary), an external tendency of the International Socialist Alternative. In the letter, they outline several differences with the leadership of the ISA, claiming supporters still remain inside ISA in Nigeria and other parts of the US.

== Rosa International ==
Rosa International is an international socialist feminist campaign named after Rosa Luxemburg and Rosa Parks aims to build the socialist-feminist wing of the Labour movement. 25 November is the International Day for the Elimination of Violence against Women, which Rosa marked in 2021 with demonstrations in at least two cities. In Taiwan the occasion was marked by an ISA demonstration in support of Peng Shuai, who disappeared after accusing former Chinese vice premier Zhang Gaoli of sexual abuse.

== Sections ==
The international's website maintains a list of 11 claimed national sections. Notable national sections include:

Section	Name
Hong Kong	社會主義行動 Sewuizyuji Haangdung (Socialist Action)
Nigeria	Movement for a Socialist Alternative
South Africa	Workers and Socialist Party (WASP)
United States	Socialist Alternative

== See also ==
- List of Trotskyist internationals
- Revolutionary socialism
