= Deidre Carter =

South African politician

Deidre Carter MP

Member of the National Assembly of South Africa
- In office 6 May 2009 – 7 May 2019

Deputy Secretary-General of the Congress of the People
- Incumbent
- Assumed office November 2008
- Preceded by: Office created

Personal details
- Party: Congress of the People
- Occupation: Politician

Deidre Carter is a South African politician who served as a Member of the National Assembly of South Africa from May 2009 to May 2019 representing the Congress of the People. Carter also served as Deputy Secretary-General of the Congress of the People.

== Early life and career ==
Carter was born in the Free State but moved to KwaZulu-Natal in 1990. She owned several businesses including restaurants and hotels.

== Political career ==
Carter was a founding member of the Congress of the People and attended the first National Convention. After the conference, she was elected Deputy Secretary-General of the party. She was selected as a candidate for the party and elected at the 2009 election. Carter entered politics due to her concern about crime and corruption, deterioration in the rule of law and problems in the public healthcare and education systems.
