= Mluleki George =

South African politician (1948–2021)

Personal details
- Born: 2 February 1948
- Died: 5 January 2021 (aged 72) East London, Eastern Cape
- Party: United Congress (2013–2021)
- Other political affiliations: Congress of the People (2008–2013); African National Congress (1972–2008)
- Occupation: Politician; Anti-apartheid activist

Mluleki Editor George (2 February 1948 – 5 January 2021) was a South African activist, politician and sports administrator. He served as a Deputy Minister of Defence from 2004 to 2008.

== Political career ==
George joined the banned African National Congress (ANC) in 1972, and was arrested by the apartheid government, and sentenced to five years in prison in 1978, some of which he spent on Robben Island. On his release, he was a founder member of the United Democratic Front in 1983.

He was elected as a Member of the National Assembly of South Africa for the ANC in the first non-racial elections in 1994, and remained in the role until 2013. Originally elected as a member of the ANC, he along with a number of other Thabo Mbeki supporters, he joined the breakaway Congress of the People after the election of Jacob Zuma as party president in 2008.

He served as treasurer-general of the Congress of the People.

In 2013, disillusioned by the leadership of leader Mosiuoa Lekota, he founded a new political party, the United Congress, which he said would restore the moral fibre of society.

== Sport career ==
George had a long career in sports administration, with his first high-profile role being president of the Border Rugby Union. He held this role until 1976, when he was arrested. After his release from prison, he was again elected president, and remained in the position from 1986 to 1991.

George was a founder member of the National Sports Council in 1988, a founder and executive member of the National Olympic Committee of South Africa in 1989, and chairperson of the South African Football Association for the first year of its existence, from 1991.

He was president of the National Sports Council and United Border Rugby Union from 1991 to 2001, a vice-president of the South African Rugby Football Union from 1993 until 1998 and a member of the International Rugby Board from 1994 to 1997.

George was a board member of South African Rugby Union from 2003.

== Death ==
George died from COVID-19 on 5 January 2021, during the COVID-19 pandemic in South Africa. He was 72 years old.
