= Congress of the People (South African political party) =

- President: Vacant
- Chairperson: Teboho Loate
- Secretary-General: Diratsagae Alfred Kganare
- Spokesperson: Vacant
- Deputy President: Vacant
- Deputy Secretary General: Vacant
- Founders: Mosiuoa Lekota; Mbhazima Shilowa; Mluleki George
- Founded: 16 December 2008; 17 years ago
- Split from: African National Congress
- Headquarters: 34–36 Fricker Road, Illovo, Gauteng
- Student wing: COPE Students Movement
- Youth wing: COPE Youth Movement
- Women's wing: COPE Women's Movement
- Business and Professionals' wing: COPE Business and Professionals
- Ideology: Social democracy Social liberalism Progressivism
- Political position: Centre-left
- National affiliation: Collective for Democracy
- Colours: Yellow Red
- Slogan: Reliable, Accountable, Incorruptible
- National Assembly seats: 0 / 400
- NCOP seats: 0 / 90
- Provincial Legislatures: 0 / 430

Party flag

Website
- www.copesa.org.za

The Congress of the People (COPE) is a South African political party formed in 2008 by former members of the African National Congress (ANC). The party was founded by former ANC members Mosiuoa Lekota, Mbhazima Shilowa and Mluleki George to contest the 2009 general election. The party was announced following a national convention held in Sandton on 1 November 2008, and was founded at a congress held in Bloemfontein on 16 December 2008. The name echoes the 1955 Congress of the People at which the Freedom Charter was adopted by the ANC and other parties, a name strongly contested by the ANC in a legal move dismissed by the Pretoria High Court.

In the 2009 general election, the party received 1,311,027 votes and a 7.42% share of the vote. Following the 2009 elections, COPE experienced a leadership dispute between factions supporting Mosiuoa Lekota and others supporting Mbhazima Shilowa, that led to a 2013 court battle, and continued into 2014. After the 2014 election, COPE was left with only three seats in the National Assembly, down from 30 seats in 2009.

Despite its reduced stature, the party joined with the much larger Democratic Alliance (DA) and several other smaller parties to co-govern Nelson Mandela Bay, Johannesburg and Tshwane after the 2016 municipal elections.

COPE had its worst performance at the 2024 national and provincial elections, garnering 0.09 percent of the votes and failing to secure a single seat in parliament.

== History ==
=== 52nd ANC national conference ===
The birth of the party can be traced back to the 52nd ANC national conference held at Polokwane in December 2007. The conference resulted in the election of Jacob Zuma and his supporters, ahead of Thabo Mbeki and his supporters, to the ANC's governing body, the National Executive Committee. Zuma was elected ANC president ahead of Mbeki. The conference highlighted the different factions within the ANC and brought to the fore the diametrically opposed philosophies between Mbeki and Zuma. This included differences in both style and economic policy – the former pursued neoliberal economic policies and was known for an aloof personality and plotting against his political opponents, while his successor is more left-wing and populist, and has a closer relationship with the South African Communist Party and Congress of South African Trade Unions. The split also revealed underlying ethnic tensions between Zulu and Xhosa speakers, represented by Jacob Zuma and Thabo Mbeki respectively, as they jostled for political predominance.

=== Zuma corruption trial and recall of Mbeki ===
Jacob Zuma, now elected president of the ANC and ANC candidate for president in the South Africa at the 2009 election, was facing corruption charges in relation to a multi-billion rand arms deal with French manufacturer Thales Group (SA division Thint). Zuma had previously been dismissed by Mbeki as South Africa's vice-president at the start of the arms deal trial.

In 2008, a landmark ruling by high court judge Chris Nicholson found that the re-charging of Zuma by the National Prosecuting Authority was illegal and was unduly influenced by Mbeki due to political motives. The case against Zuma was thus dismissed. As a consequence of the judge's findings of political interference, the ANC's National Executive Committee requested the recall of Mbeki as the country's president. Mbeki tendered his resignation on 21 September 2008 and the resignation became official on 25 September. Many members of Mbeki's cabinet resigned their posts at the same time in solidarity, including vice-president Phumzile Mlambo-Ngcuka and other senior cabinet ministers.

The recall of Mbeki brought to the fore simmering tensions within the ANC. On 23 September Mosiuoa Lekota announced that he had served the ANC with "divorce papers" and on 8 October announced that a national convention would be held to discuss the future of South African politics and the possible formation of a new political movement.

Lekota's call resounded with many Mbeki supporters who started handing in their resignations to the ANC to join Lekota's movement. Notable resignations include those of former Gauteng premier Mbhazima Shilowa, former Western Cape minister of safety and security Leonard Ramatlakane and Mluleki George. Across the country many regular ANC members also handed in their resignations in public demonstrations, burning their ANC membership cards. The resignation movement resounded particularly in provinces in which there were already splits in the ANC structure, such as the Western Cape.

=== Convention and formation of new party ===
The convention called by Lekota was held in Sandton on 1 November 2008. Planned for 4,000 delegates over two days, the conference eventually hosted over 5,000, with some people not able to get into the venue, and was shortened to one day to avoid inconvenience to those delegates who had nowhere to stay overnight. The conference was attended by major political figures, including delegates from other political parties. The ANC did not send a delegation to the conference.

Following the conference, Lekota announced that a new party would be formed on 16 December. In Western Cape municipal by-elections on 11 December 2008, COPE won 10 of 27 wards (with its candidates running as independents, as it was not yet registered); the ANC won only three wards, with twelve of its candidates disqualified due to missing the registration deadline. The DA won nine seats.

The party was formally launched at a three-day conference from 14 to 16 December 2008, at which Lekota was named president.

=== 2009 general election ===
Proportion of votes cast for COPE in the 2009 election, by ward. 0–20% 20–40% 40–60% 60–80% 80–100%

The party faced its first general election in 2009. Their election manifesto was launched on 24 January 2009 and included calls for electoral reform to have the president, provincial premiers and municipal mayors directly elected. South Africa currently has a pure proportional representation system with parties submitting lists of candidates in order of preference. The president and provincial premiers and mayors (after municipal elections) are subsequently elected by the members of the relevant assembly.

On 20 February 2009, they announced clergyman Mvume Dandala as their presidential candidate. A COPE official was murdered in the Eastern Cape, and COPE supporters, from the Eastern Cape, were driven out of their shacks in Durban. The party achieved the leadership of the opposition in the legislatures of Eastern Cape, Free State, Limpopo and Northern Cape and representation in all nine provinces.

== Election results ==
=== National Assembly elections ===
Election	Party leader	Total votes	Share of vote	Seats	+/–	Government
2009	Mosiuoa Lekota	1,311,027	7.42%	30 / 400	New	Opposition
2014	Mosiuoa Lekota	123,235	0.67%	3 / 400	▼27	Opposition
2019	Mosiuoa Lekota	47,461	0.27%	2 / 400	▼1	Opposition
2024	Mosiuoa Lekota	14,177	0.09% (Note: From 2024, seats in the National Assembly are determined by a combination of the national ballot, and the nine regional ballots. Only the national ballot figures are shown here.)	0 / 400	▼2	Extra-parliamentary

=== Provincial elections ===
Election	Eastern Cape		Free State		Gauteng		Kwazulu-Natal		Limpopo		Mpumalanga		North-West		Northern Cape		Western Cape	
Election	%	Seats	%	Seats	%	Seats	%	Seats	%	Seats	%	Seats	%	Seats	%	Seats	%	Seats
2009	13.67	9/63	11.61	4/30	7.78	6/73	1.29	1/80	7.53	4/49	2.91	1/30	8.33	3/33	16.67	5/30	7.74	3/42
2014	1.20	1/63	1.63	0/30	0.49	0/73	0.16	0/80	0.86	1/49	0.32	0/30	0.94	0/33	3.60	1/30	0.59	0/42
2019	0.25	0/63	0.45	0/30	0.24	0/73	0.14	0/80	0.23	0/49	0.15	0/30	0.27	0/33	0.86	0/30	0.32	0/42
2024	0.12	0/73	0.22	0/30	0.13	0/80	0.10	0/80	0.17	0/64			0.20	0/38	0.25	0/30	0.09	0/42

=== Municipal elections ===
Election	Votes	%
2011	570,698	2.1%
2016	186,185	0.48%
2021	62,556	0.2%

== Provincial election candidates ==
Ahead of the 2009 general election, COPE's list of provincial premiership candidates was announced in the Sunday Sun newspaper on 2 March 2009. Its candidate for Premier of Limpopo, serving Premier Sello Moloto, was announced slightly belatedly. Candidates for the 2019 general election were announced on 11 March 2019; the initial candidate for Premier of the Western Cape, Anthony Hall, was later replaced by Deidre Carter.

List of COPE candidates for Premier
	2009	2019
Free State	Casca Mokitlane	Teboho Loate
Gauteng	Lyndall Shope-Mafole	Dennis Bloem
KwaZulu-Natal	Lucky Sifiso Gabela	Jessica Panday
Mpumalanga	Prudence Madonsela	Ouma Mathebula
Limpopo	Sello Moloto	Mankgwana Rampedi
North West	Nikiwe Num	Matsholo Lekgalanyane
Eastern Cape	Wiseman Nkuhlu	Lievie Sharpley
Northern Cape	Neville Mompati	Pakes Dikgetsi
Western Cape	Allan Boesak	Deidre Carter

== Reactions ==
=== Reaction from the ANC and alliance partners ===
The ANC leadership reacted by offering a reconciliation meeting between treasurer Mathews Phosa and Lekota and his former deputy defense minister Mluleki George on 13 October. However, the meeting ended without resolution. On 14 October, Lekota and George were suspended from membership in the ANC by the National Executive Committee, with threats of suspension against any other members who sought to join Lekota and George. Both Zuma and then ANC Youth League president Julius Malema ridiculed Lekota for the announcement.

=== Support from within the ANC ===
On 15 October, former Gauteng premier Mbhazima Shilowa, who resigned from his position soon after Mbeki and the cabinet resigned, announced that he had resigned his membership from the ANC and thrown his support behind Lekota's convention, which he announced would be held on 2 November. The partnership between Lekota and Shilowa led the press to nickname the proposed new party "Shikota". Former Western Cape community safety minister Leonard Ramatlakane resigned from the ANC on 22 October to join Lekota's initiative. On 3 November, former Eastern Cape premier Nosimo Balindlela announced her resignation from the ANC in order to join the proposed new party.

On 13 November 2008, Smuts Ngonyama, the former head of communications for ANC, joined the breakaway movement.

=== Reaction from other parties ===
Helen Zille of the Democratic Alliance, Bantu Holomisa of the United Democratic Movement and Mangosuthu Buthelezi of the Inkatha Freedom Party all welcomed the announcement, saying that a new party in opposition to the ANC would diversify the political landscape and pull South Africa from being an effectively dominant-party system.

== Prominent supporters ==
COPE attracted the support of a wide range of well-known South Africans from various sectors, including Sipho Ngwema, former head of communications for the Scorpions who is now the party's media liaison chief, and cleric Allan Boesak who ran in the 2009 election as COPE's Western Cape premier candidate. Other prominent supporters include the wife of Vusi Pikoli, the former head of the National Prosecuting Authority, and Simon Grindrod, former deputy president of the Independent Democrats.

Phumzile Mlambo-Ngcuka, former deputy president under Thabo Mbeki, and Saki Macozoma, a prominent South African billionaire and close ally of Mbeki, joined COPE in late February 2009. Macozoma's affiliation to the party was accidentally leaked by Mbhazima Shilowa himself in London, United Kingdom, in the third week of January 2009 Mlambo-Ngcuka who is best known for her statement that South Africa could learn from Zimbabwe with regard to land reform.

== Policy ==
In an interview with The Sunday Times, Lekota stated that the ideology of the party will be one that embraces multiracial and multicultural participation in governance, promoting of the free market and disavowed themselves from any connection to Marxism. He has also indicated that the party would be willing to ally itself with the Democratic Alliance, a historically liberal party, in the case that the DA ever enters government.

According to the party's manifesto flyer, COPE's campaign topics for the 2009 elections are maintaining the constitutional status quo, unemployment, job satisfaction, poverty, the environment, secondary and tertiary education, health care in general, crime, women empowerment, youth development, family values, and future non-racialism.

A main distinction between COPE and the ruling ANC party is that COPE favours a system in which top-level government officials are elected directly, by public election, and officials can be removed only by courts of justice, whereas the current situation in South Africa is that top-level government officials are appointed and can be removed from office by the political parties themselves.

== Controversies ==
=== Party name ===
Before settling on the name Congress of the People and the abbreviation COPE, several possible names were used or suggested by the party founders themselves and through speculation in the media.

During a public meeting on 12 October 2008 in Langa, where Lekota was the speaker, membership forms for a possible new party, bearing the name African National Congress of South Africa (ANCSA), were distributed.

On 31 October 2008, one day prior to the new party's convention in Sandton, the ANC made an urgent application to the high court to prevent the new party from using names such as South Africa National Convention, South Africa National Congress, SANC or any other name or trademark that is similar to its own. The judge ruled that the convention may go ahead, but did make a ruling on the names issue until 6 November.

At the new party's Sandton convention, the name South African Democratic Congress (SADC) was also proposed, but it was later discovered by them that this was already being used by another party that was due to contest the 2009 election.

By 15 November, the name Congress of the People was chosen, and its official abbreviation was chosen to be COPE, not COP.

When the name settled on was the Congress of the People, the ANC announced they would challenge this name as well. The ANC's application to the Gauteng Division of the High Court at Pretoria for an interdict to prevent COPE from using the name Congress of the People, cited that the ANC itself was affiliated to the 1955 Congress of the People, held in Kliptown. On 12 December 2008, the court ruled that COPE would not be barred from using its present name.

=== Allan Boesak ===
The elevation of Boesak to the COPE leadership, given his record as a convicted malefactor, drew considerable censure from press and public alike. It was intimated that the party's self-projection as a morally pure alternative had been sullied. On 5 February 2009, on his Facebook page, Lekota urged supporters:

We should also not be distracted now by who serves in the interim leadership, because ultimately the people's voice will be heard. They will vote for their leaders, and everyone else will apply for a job and be interviewed to obtain any position. So, you see, I am not bothered by who joins COPE, or if the individual has a criminal record, or not. Is it not so, that if a gangster goes to church, he expects to dance to gospel music, not kwaito? He's fully aware of what music determines the song and dance in church. No-one is forced to join COPE – people join voluntarily, fully aware of what the organisation stands for. So, why worry about who joins? Let them; they'll dance to our music!

== Leadership conflict ==
In August 2022, deputy president Willie Madisha stated that leader Mosiuoa Lekota had been suspended. Lekota subsequently stated that his suspension was illegitimate, as Madisha, along with secretary for communications Dennis Bloem and secretary for elections Mzwandile Hleko had themselves been suspended. A press conference called by Lekota descended into a fistfight between the rival factions.

Madisha was fired by COPE in June 2023.

Bloem resigned from the party in August 2023, saying that party leader Mosiuoa Lekota had turned the party into a 'laughing stock', and that he no longer wanted to be a part of 'stomach politics'.

Mosiuoa Lekota died on 4 March 2026 at a Johannesburg hospital after a period of illness. He was 77 years old.
