= Leonard Ramatlakane =

Leonard Ramatlakane (born 16 February 1953) is the former Minister of Community Safety in the Western Cape province of South Africa whilst an ANC member. He also served as the acting Premier briefly after Marthinus Van Schalkwyk resigned in 2004.

Whilst he was Provincial Minister for Safety and Security in 2004 Ramatlakane received death threats allegedly from the Chinese triads following the arrest of suspected gang kingpin Quinton 'Mr Big' Marinus and after an increase in investigations into organised crime in the province. Ramatlakane then controversially spent R347,716 of public money on enhancing security at his home. The Western Cape Provincial Parliament's standing committee on public accounts recommended that Ramatlakane pay the money back with both then opposition DA and the governing ANC voting against him.

Ramatlakane resigned after the Premier Rasool was fired on 25 July 2008; he resigned as Community Safety MEC on 31 July 2008, making the way for the new Premier, Lynne Brown, to appoint her own MECs. He was the spokesperson on Public Service and Administration for the Congress of the People. In 2014 it transpired that he had defected from COPE to ANC when his name appeared on the ANC's list of national parliamentary candidates published on 11 March 2013.
