= Workers and Socialist Party =

Political party in South Africa

- Abbreviation: WASP
- Leader: Collective leadership
- Founded: 1979; 47 years ago, as Marxist Workers Tendency; 1996; 30 years ago, as Socialist Alternative; 1996; 30 years ago, as Democratic Socialist Movement; 2013; 13 years ago, as Workers and Socialist Party
- Dissolved: 2024 (de facto)
- Newspaper: 1981–1989; Inqaba Ya Basebenzi; 1990–1996; Congress Militant; 1996–2019; Izwi Labasebenzi; 2019–present; uManyano lwaBasebenzi
- Youth wing: Socialist Youth Movement (SYM)
- Ideology: Communism; Marxism; Socialism; Trotskyism
- Political position: Far-left
- International affiliation: International Socialist Alternative
- Colours: Red

Website
- workerssocialistparty.org.za

The Workers and Socialist Party (WASP) was a Marxist and Trotskyist political party in South Africa affiliated to International Socialist Alternative.

== History ==
=== Marxist Workers Tendency ===
WASP began life as the Marxist Workers Tendency (MWT), operating inside the African National Congress (ANC) from 1979. The MWT was founded by activists who had helped build independent trade unions and participated in the 1973 Durban strike wave and youth from the Black Consciousness movement. Active both in exile and within South Africa the MWT was an affiliate of the Committee for a Workers International (CWI) participating with them in the struggle for socialism worldwide. This included fighting for direct links between the international labour movement and South Africa's emerging independent trade unions that later formed the Congress of South African Trade Unions (Cosatu).

The MWT published the journal Inqaba Ya Basebenzi in exile for circulation underground in South Africa between 1981 and 1990 and later, following the ANC's unbanning, the newspaper Congress Militant published inside the country.

The MWT raised the slogan "For a mass ANC on a socialist programme" with no illusions that the pro-capitalist ANC leadership would ever commit to a socialist programme. Rather, the MWT oriented toward the ANC because at that stage the mass of the working class looked toward it for unity in the struggle against apartheid. But the MWT explained that the only way genuine national liberation and economic freedom for the black working class majority could be achieved, including the Freedom Charter’s demands for free education, free healthcare, welfare and workers’ rights, was on the basis of a socialist revolution and the nationalisation of the commanding heights of the economy - the banks, the mines, the commercial farms, big factories and big businesses - under democratic working class control.

The MWT worked for the independent organisation of the working class within the ANC and openly criticised the leadership. This resulted in four of its leading members' suspension in 1979 and expulsion from the ANC without a hearing in 1985.

In 1996 the MWT left the ANC when it adopted in government the neo-liberal Growth Employment and Redistribution policy (GEAR). The MWT believed that the working class would increasingly come into conflict with the ANC leadership as it embraced the maintenance of capitalism and worked to demobilise the mass movement that had forced the end of apartheid by subordinating Cosatu within the Tripartite Alliance under the influence of the anti-socialist ideas of the South African Communist Party. The MWT’s perspective anticipated that developments toward independent working class organisation would increasingly take place outside of the ANC and in direct opposition to it. In recognition of this changed situation, in 1996, the MWT, after briefly reconstituting itself outside the ANC as Socialist Alternative, became the Democratic Socialist Movement (DSM).

=== Mineworkers (2009–2012) ===
==== Marikana massacre ====
In 2009 the DSM met a group of more than 4,000 workers from Aquarius Platinum’s Kroondal shafts which were then managed by Murray & Roberts (M&R). These workers had been dismissed after a wage strike in August 2009 after the Cosatu-affiliated National Union of Mineworkers (NUM) obtained a strike certificate, then cut a deal with management behind the workers’ backs. The DSM was able to push the M&R workers’ dismissal case through the Labour Court. The M&R workers had already elected a strike committee which held weekly mass meetings. A number of workers, including strike committee members, joined DSM and founded the DSM’s first mineworkers’ branch at Kroondal in Rustenburg.

The DSM developed a perspective recognising that the ‘love-triangle’ between the mine bosses, the ANC government and the NUM leadership was pushing the mineworkers ahead of most workers into facing-up to the co-option of their organisations and the betrayals of their leaders. The Kroondal DSM branch together with DSM’s national office in Johannesburg took part in and supported the struggles around Rustenburg in the following years including the Lonmin workers when they went on strike at the Karee shafts in 2011, and the Impala workers who took strike action in January 2012.

In August 2012 when the strike at Lonmin for a R12,500 monthly minimum wage started, the DSM gave its full support. The Marikana massacre changed the situation decisively. Immediately after the massacre, DSM put out a pamphlet calling for workers to respond by shutting down all of Rustenburg's mines in a local general strike. DSM’s developing network of members and contacts traveled across the mines linking-up workers in the different companies and shafts.

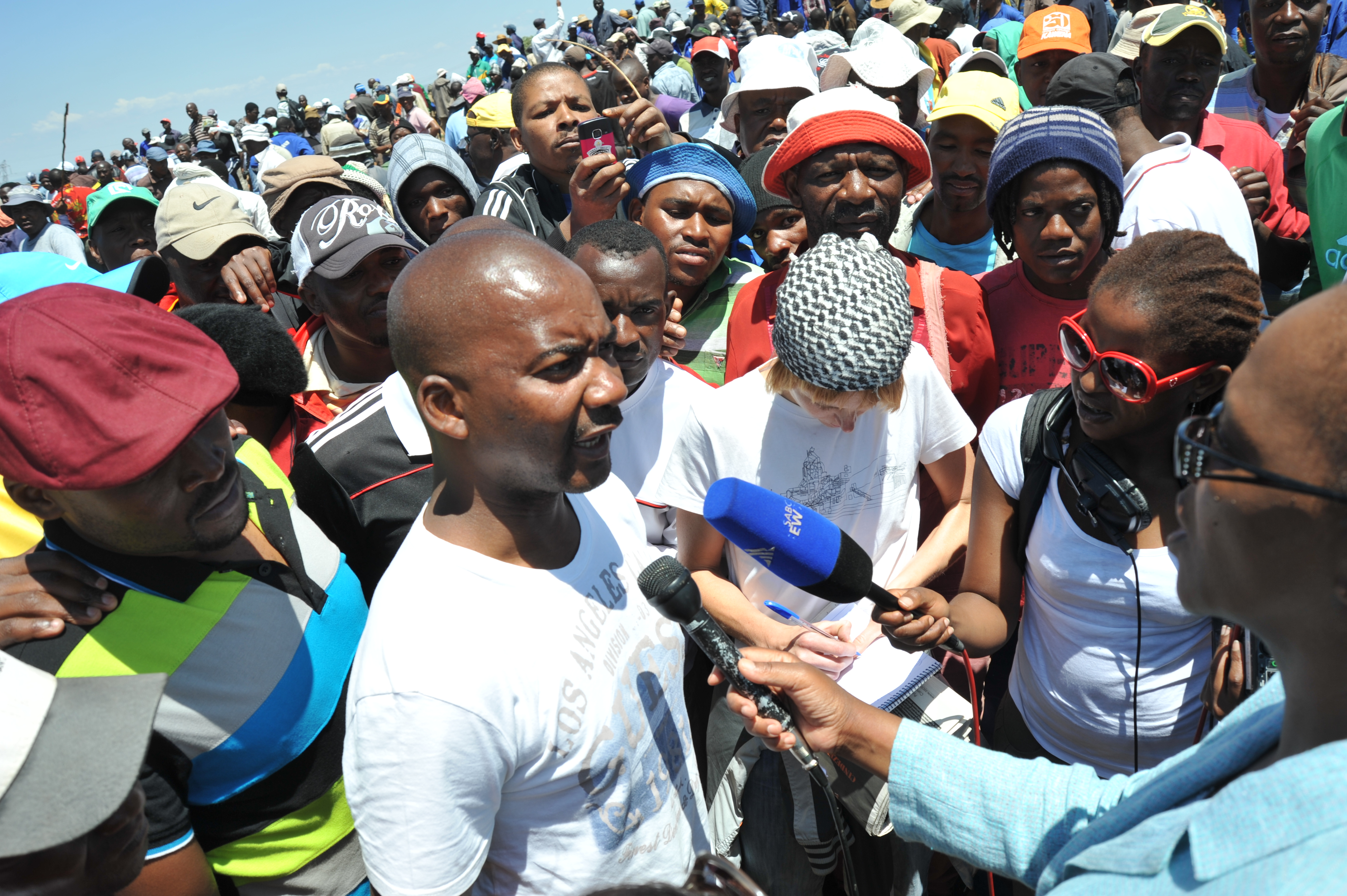
WASP activist Mametlwe Sebei building the October 2012 mineworkers strikes

After weeks of patient work and the undented determination of the mineworkers, the possibility of calling a co-ordinated strike across all Rustenburg’s mines was posed. The Anglo American Platinum (Amplats) mineworkers’ strike committee gave a lead by starting their strike first. From the platform of the Amplats strike a meeting with representatives of the strike committees of Lonmin, Amplats, Samancor and Aquarius, together with the DSM called for a meeting on 11 September 2012. This meeting founded the Rustenburg Joint Coordinating Strike Committee and agreed to organise a co-ordinated strike, starting on 13 September 2012. For a few days in mid-September 2012, nearly the whole of Rustenburg’s mining industry was closed down.

This led to the DSM making contact with mineworkers from across the country who were joining the strike and seeking unity and advice. DSM activists travelled across the mines of the North West, Limpopo and Gauteng to try and link-up workers. This work became the basis for the National Strike Committee, which was formed on 13 October 2012 at a meeting in Marikana. More than 120 representatives attended representing over 150,000 mineworkers organised in independent committees.

The determined strike action resulted in the historic victory of a R12,500 minimum wage for the Lonmin workers under the leadership of their own strike committee. The punitive dismissal of 12,000 Amplats workers was defeated. Workers across the platinum and gold sectors won ‘allowances’ to compensate for lost income during the strikes.

=== Launch of WASP (2012–2015) ===
During the 2012 mineworkers’ strikes at mass meeting after mass meeting, the DSM put forward the idea of building a new party of the working class with a socialist programme that could champion, amongst other things, the nationalisation of the mines under the democratic control of the mineworkers. The idea was widely supported by mineworkers across the country.

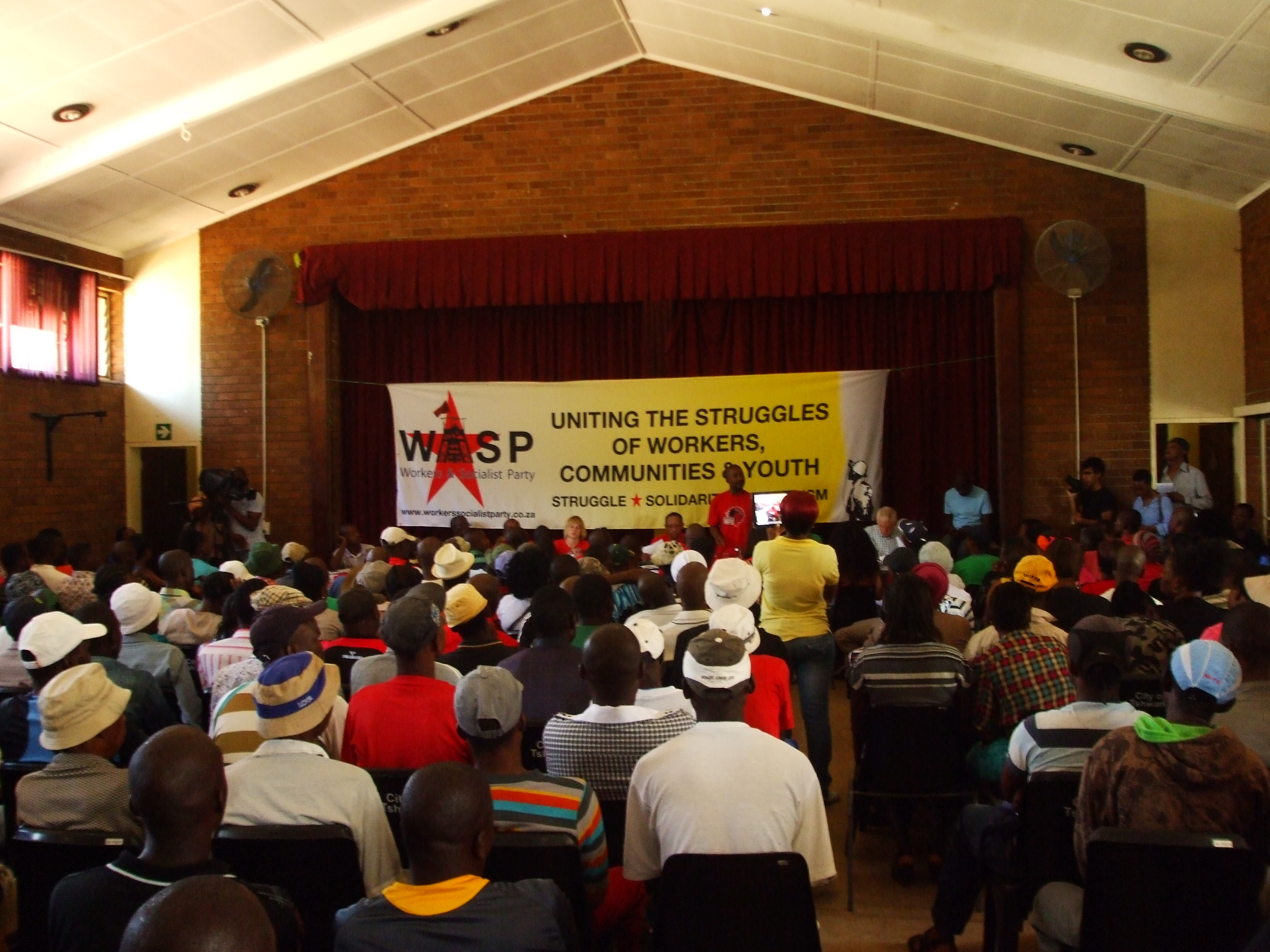
WASP's 21 March 2013 launch rally, Pretoria

At a meeting on 15 December 2012 the DSM and representatives of a number of the mineworkers’ strike committees founded the Workers and Socialist Party (WASP). The public launch of WASP took place on 21 March 2013 in Pretoria.

WASP was organised as an "umbrella-type" federation that could begin the work of drawing together forces that could lay the foundation of a mass party. This would include independent workers organisations, such as the mineworkers’ independent strike committees, community groups and social movements. Other than the DSM and the mineworkers’ national strike committee, which affiliated in March 2013, significant forces organised under WASP’s umbrella included the National Transport Movement union, a significant split from the Cosatu-affiliated South African Transport and Allied Workers Union; Moses Mayekiso, the first general secretary of the National Union of Metalworkers of South Africa (NUMSA), and activist in South Africa’s civic movement; and organisations of Johannesburg’s street traders whom WASP worked with in a campaign against the Johannesburg municipality’s 2013 ‘Operation Clean Sweep’, culminating in a march of several thousand traders. Affiliates of WASP would retain their separate organisational identities within the broader party structure.

Contesting the upcoming 2014 national and provincial elections was raised as a key task and WASP was registered with the Independent Electoral Commission in April 2013. WASP’s 2014 election lists reflected the broad electoral coalition that was built. Moses Mayekiso was put forward to head the list as WASP’s presidential candidate, followed in second and third place respectively by DSM Executive Committee members Mametlwe Sebei and Weizmann Hamilton. Other notable candidates included the deputy general secretary of the National Transport Movement, the general secretary of the General Industries Workers Union of South Africa, a regional office bearer in an emergency workers' union; mineworkers’ strike committee leaders from the gold sector in Gauteng, the Platinum sector in Rustenburg and Limpopo, and the coal sector in eMalahleni; leading community activists from independent civics in the Tshwane, Ekurhuleni, Johannesburg, Sekhukhune, Mogalakwena and Ingquza Hill municipalities; a leading activist of the Johannesburg street traders; a shop steward from the metalworkers’ NUMSA union; and a university student activist from the Socialist Youth Movement.

In the 2014 national and provincial elections WASP received 8,331 votes on the national ballot (0.05% of the total votes cast) and a further 4,159 votes on the three provincial ballots contested.

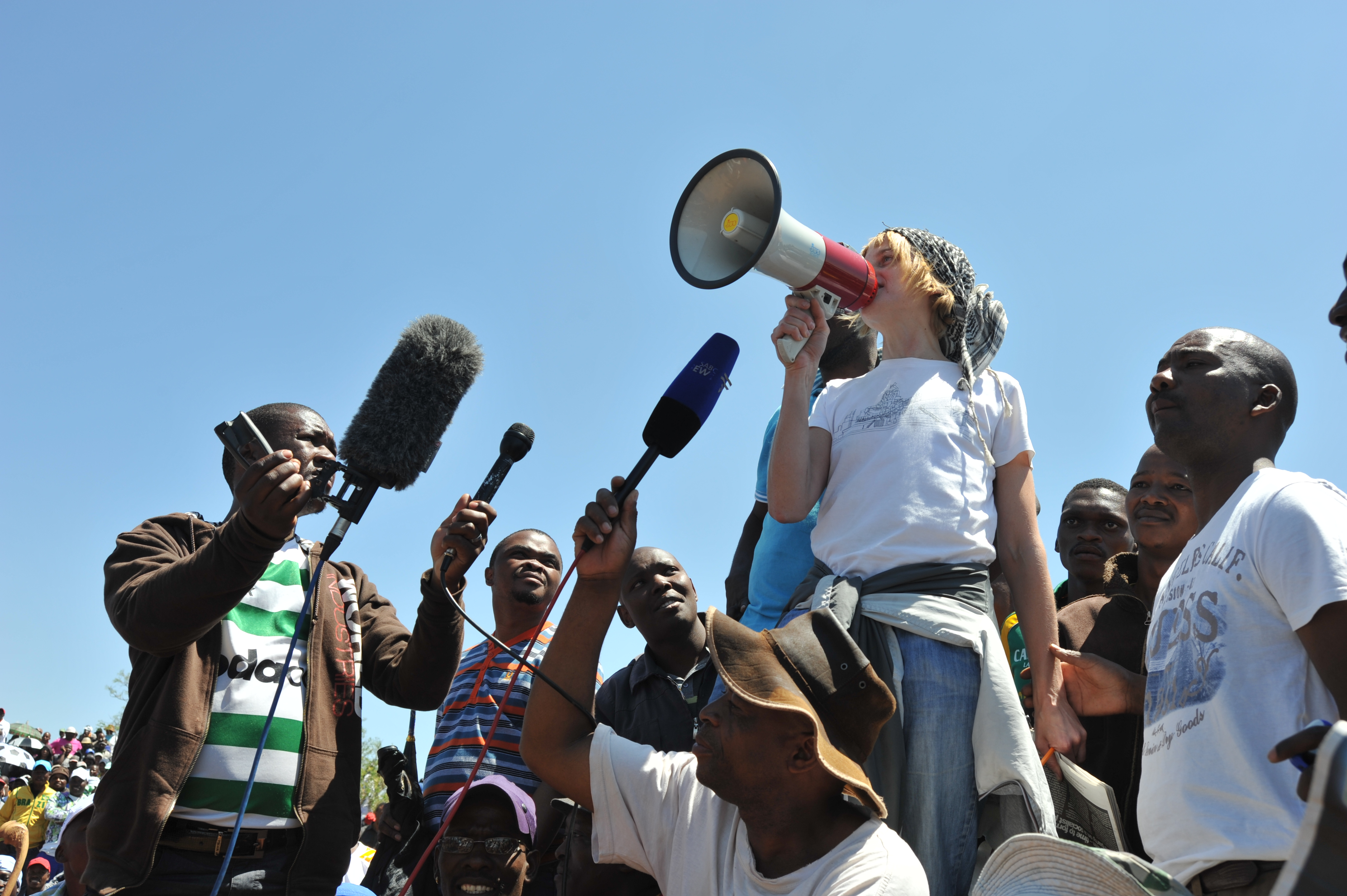
Liv Shange addresses striking mineworkers in Carletonville during 2012 national strikes

In July 2013, leading DSM and WASP activist Liv Shange was denied re-entry into South Africa. The DSM alleged that the ANC government was behind the sudden Department of Home Affairs investigation into her "immigration status" which they pointed out began in an unlikely coincidence, the day after Shange, resident in South Africa for nearly a decade, departed for a family holiday in her country of birth, Sweden. Shange, fluent in Zulu, had come to national prominence for her public role in the 2012 mineworkers’ strikes. Gwede Mantashe, general secretary of the ANC, made public speeches blaming "foreign nationals" for the unrest on the mines, singling out Swedes and Irish. The DSM alleged that the former was clearly a reference to Liv Shange and the latter a reference to Joe Higgins, a Socialist Party/CWI MP in Ireland who had attended the launch of WASP some months earlier in solidarity with the South African workers’ movement. After a high profile international campaign was launched by the CWI, including protests from MPs and trade union leaders across Europe, the United States and South America, Shange was granted permission to return to South Africa. The incident also led to a protest by the Swedish embassy against Mantashe’s comments.

Following the 2014 elections the DSM proposed the re-organisation of WASP, arguing that there were a number of important changes on the left of South African politics and within the workers movement which complicated continuing with WASP as it was originally conceived – as a broad umbrella that could act as a pole of attraction for uniting the forces that could build a mass workers party. The new factors included the emergence of the Economic Freedom Fighters with a radical left programme whose leadership were unwilling to make a principled alliance with WASP; the metalworkers’ union NUMSA, whose delegates to their December 2013 Special National Congress voted not to support the ANC and "explore the possibility of a new workers’ party", but whose leadership rejected supporting WASP in the 2014 elections as a step toward that; and the consolidation of the Association of Mineworkers and Construction Union (AMCU) in the mining sector whose leadership ensured the independent mineworkers’ strike committees were closed down and who rejected any role for AMCU in a new workers party and were actively hostile to WASP.

At a national WASP meeting held in Johannesburg on 14 February 2015 the decision was taken to end WASP’s federal "umbrella" approach in favour of a revolutionary Marxist individual membership structure. In effect this meant the merger of DSM with members of WASP upon the basis of the DSM’s political programme and organising principles. With the completion of this reorganisation, in December 2015 the name DSM was dropped and WASP became the name of the CWI in South Africa. In its new form, WASP continues to be at the forefront of campaigning for the creation of a new socialist mass workers party in South Africa.

=== 2019 split ===
After the CWI split in 2019, a minority of the WASP membership, including Weizmann Hamilton, left the party on 7 September 2019 to form the Marxist Workers Party, supporting the "Refounded CWI", while WASP itself supported the "CWI Majority" (renamed International Socialist Alternative).

== Political positions ==
As a revolutionary socialist party, WASP bases its political programme on the ideas of Marxism and Trotskyism.
