= Socialist Party of Nigeria =

Political party in Nigeria

- Founded: 2013
- Ideology: Socialism
- Political position: Far-left
- Colours: Red
- Seats in the Senate: 0 / 109
- Seats in the House: 0 / 360
- Governorships: 0 / 36

The Socialist Party of Nigeria (SPN) is a socialist political party in Nigeria. The SPN was launched as an initiative by the Democratic Socialist Movement and held its inaugural conference in Lagos on 16 November 2013.

The SPN filed for registration as a political party in order to contest the 2015 Nigerian general election, but the Independent National Electoral Commission (INEC) refused the registration. The SPN sued the INEC at the Federal High Court, claiming that INEC had failed to respond to their petition within 30 days as prescribed by law and that thus it would have to be registered automatically. The party has since received an INEC certificate of registration and has vowed to "liberate Nigerians from economic hardship.

== Political positions ==
=== Education Reform ===
The SPN supports the provision of free and quality education at all levels. The party plans to eliminate fees and charges in public schools to ensure equal educational opportunities. It intends to invest in educational infrastructure, recruit additional teachers, and manage schools through elected committees composed of education workers, parents, and community members for transparency and accountability.

=== Sustainable Energy and Electrification ===
The SPN aims to provide reliable and affordable electricity to support industrial development and improve living standards. The party advocates for the re-nationalization of the electricity sector, placing it under democratic control to ensure efficient distribution. Investments in traditional and renewable energy sources, such as solar and wind power, are central to their plan.

=== Environment ===
The party will require comprehensive environmental impact assessments for all projects and implement policies to prevent flooding, reduce pollution, combat desertification and deforestation, and promote environmentally friendly energy sources. It also commits to cleaning up oil pollution and compensating affected communities.
