= Democratic Socialist Movement (Nigeria) =

Political party in Nigeria

- General Secretary: Segun Sango
- Founded: 1986
- Headquarters: Lagos, Nigeria
- Newspaper: Socialist Democracy
- Ideology: Marxism; Socialism; Trotskyism
- Political position: Far-left
- National affiliation: Socialist Party of Nigeria
- International affiliation: Committee for a Workers' International (2019)
- Colours: Red

Website
- www.socialistnigeria.org

The Democratic Socialist Movement (DSM) is a Trotskyist political party in Nigeria. It is affiliated to the Committee for a Workers' International.

== Foundation ==
The Democratic Socialist Movement was founded in 1986 at a conference of labour and student socialist activists. Due to the ongoing military dictatorship the organisation only operated in a semi-open manner and was identified mainly by the name of its newspaper, Labour Militant (1987–1994) and Militant (1994–1998). Following the death of junta leader Sani Abacha in June 1998 and the impending end of military rule, the DSM launched as an open organisation in July of that year.

== Campaigns ==
Members of the DSM have been subject to arrest as a result of campaigning.

The DSM launched the Education Rights Campaign, mobilised for a national day of action on education and jobs on 19 June 2013.

Members of the DSM protested at the South African High Commission in Lagos against the Marikana massacre in Lonmin, in which 34 miners were killed.

== Alliances ==
The DSM has argued since the 1980s for the formation of a mass working people's party and participated in the briefly lived Nigerian Labour Party in 1989. They argue that such a party should be wholly opposed to neo-liberalism and privatisation.

=== National Conscience Party ===
In 1994, the DSM joined in the founding by Gani Fawehinmi of the National Conscience Party. In the 2003 elections, the DSM stood as candidates for the NCP and achieved some of the party's highest votes. Since then, Lagos State NCP has quit the National Conscience Party.

=== Socialist Party of Nigeria ===
The DSM launched an initiative for the Socialist Party of Nigeria, which was inaugurated on 16 November 2013 in Lagos.
