= Hlumelo Biko =

South African businessman (born 1978)

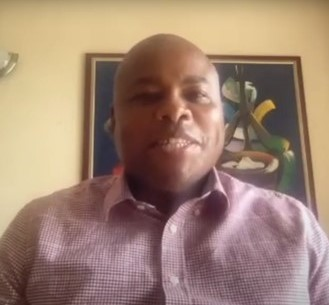
- Biko in 2022

Chief Executive of Build One South Africa
- Incumbent
- Assumed office 24 September 2022
- Leader: Mmusi Maimane
- Preceded by: Party founded

Personal details
- Born: 19 January 1978 (age 48) King William's Town, Eastern Cape, South Africa
- Party: Build One South Africa (2022–present)
- Other political affiliations: Agang South Africa (2013–2014)
- Parent(s): Steve Biko; Mamphela Ramphele
- Education: University of Cape Town (BA); Georgetown University (MS)
- Occupation: Businessman; investment banker; philanthropist; politician; activist

Hlumelo Biko (born 19 January 1978) is a South African businessman and investment banker. He is the son of Steve Biko and Mamphela Ramphele.

== Early life and education ==
Biko's mother Ramphele was five months pregnant with him when she learned that Steve Biko, with whom she was having an affair, had been killed in police custody. She named Biko Hlumelo because it means "the shoot of a tree" in the Xhosa language.

Biko holds a B.A. in history and politics from the University of Cape Town, and a master of science in International Business Government Relationships degree from Georgetown University.

== Career ==
Biko worked for the World Bank in Washington, D.C. in 1998.

Biko and Ramphele co-founded Circle Capital, an investment company, in 2005. Biko was the CEO of Circle Capital. In 2008, Bespoke Magazine called him "the driving force behind a multi-million rand black empowerment company... one of South Africa's most intriguing empowerment vehicles." in a failed business venture where Biko was the Chairperson and a colleague and friend Clive Rugara, Circle line food group faced lawsuits from suppliers and former employees for non payment . Financial challenges and “poor trading conditions ” forced Circle Food Group to close their doors.

== Philanthropy ==
In parallel with a 13-year career as a venture capitalist, Biko is also a philanthropist, currently serving as vice-chairman of the Baxter Theatre, supporting budding small and medium enterprises as a board member of Endeavor offering mentorship and advice to a number of South African entrepreneurs, and supporting access to education through institutions like Kommunity Group Projects, the University of Cape Town and African Schools for Excellence.

== Personal life ==
In early January 2018, Biko was arrested on charges of assault related to domestic violence against his wife. The charges were later dropped and the couple divorced.
