= Blouberg Local Municipality elections =

The Blouberg Local Municipality is a Local Municipality in Limpopo, South Africa. The council consists of forty-four members elected by mixed-member proportional representation. Twenty-two councillors are elected by first-past-the-post voting in twenty-two wards, while the remaining twenty-two are chosen from party lists so that the total number of party representatives is proportional to the number of votes received. In the election of 1 November 2021 the African National Congress (ANC) won a majority of thirty-three seats.

== Results ==
The following table shows the composition of the council after past elections.

Event	ACDP	ANC	COPE	DA	EFF	Other	Total
2000 election	—	29	—	3	—	—	32
2006 election	1	31	—	3	—	1	36
2011 election	1	37	1	2	—	0	41
2016 election	0	33	1	2	8	0	44
2021 election	—	33	2	1	7	1	44

== December 2000 election ==
The following table shows the results of the 2000 election.

Party	Ward			List			Total seats
Party	Votes	%	Seats	Votes	%	Seats	Total seats
African National Congress	11,592	85.95	16	18,607	88.04	13	29
Democratic Alliance	1,895	14.05	0	2,528	11.96	3	3
Total	13,487	100.00	16	21,135	100.00	16	32
Valid votes	13,487	97.65		21,135	98.08		
Invalid/blank votes	325	2.35		414	1.92		
Total votes	13,812	100.00		21,549	100.00		
Registered voters/turnout	53,667	25.74		53,667	40.15		

== March 2006 election ==
The following table shows the results of the 2006 election.

Party	Ward			List			Total seats
Party	Votes	%	Seats	Votes	%	Seats	Total seats
African National Congress	25,986	84.65	18	26,475	86.73	13	31
Democratic Alliance	2,087	6.80	0	2,145	7.03	3	3
United Independent Front	701	2.28	0	730	2.39	1	1
Independent candidates	1,231	4.01	0				0
African Christian Democratic Party	406	1.32	0	487	1.60	1	1
United Democratic Movement	122	0.40	0	427	1.40	0	0
Azanian People's Organisation	166	0.54	0	262	0.86	0	0
Total	30,699	100.00	18	30,526	100.00	18	36
Valid votes	30,699	98.71		30,526	98.18		
Invalid/blank votes	400	1.29		566	1.82		
Total votes	31,099	100.00		31,092	100.00		
Registered voters/turnout	63,772	48.77		63,772	48.75		

== May 2011 election ==
The following table shows the results of the 2011 election.

Party	Ward			List			Total seats
Party	Votes	%	Seats	Votes	%	Seats	Total seats
African National Congress	31,873	87.62	21	32,461	88.91	16	37
Democratic Alliance	1,487	4.09	0	1,421	3.89	2	2
African Christian Democratic Party	529	1.45	0	1,714	4.69	1	1
Independent candidates	1,873	5.15	0				0
Congress of the People	523	1.44	0	636	1.74	1	1
Azanian People's Organisation	77	0.21	0	179	0.49	0	0
United Democratic Movement	16	0.04	0	97	0.27	0	0
Total	36,378	100.00	21	36,508	100.00	20	41
Valid votes	36,378	98.38		36,508	98.70		
Invalid/blank votes	599	1.62		482	1.30		
Total votes	36,977	100.00		36,990	100.00		
Registered voters/turnout	72,151	51.25		72,151	51.27		

== August 2016 election ==
The following table shows the results of the 2016 election.

Party	Ward			List			Total seats
Party	Votes	%	Seats	Votes	%	Seats	Total seats
African National Congress	30,986	73.46	22	31,347	74.15	11	33
Economic Freedom Fighters	7,450	17.66	0	7,277	17.21	8	8
Democratic Alliance	2,279	5.40	0	2,229	5.27	2	2
Congress of the People	843	2.00	0	781	1.85	1	1
Agang South Africa	273	0.65	0	291	0.69	0	0
African Christian Democratic Party	253	0.60	0	241	0.57	0	0
United Democratic Movement	97	0.23	0	111	0.26	0	0
Total	42,181	100.00	22	42,277	100.00	22	44
Valid votes	42,181	98.66		42,277	98.71		
Invalid/blank votes	574	1.34		552	1.29		
Total votes	42,755	100.00		42,829	100.00		
Registered voters/turnout	84,327	50.70		84,327	50.79		

== November 2021 election ==
The following table shows the results of the 2021 election.

Party	Ward			List			Total seats
Party	Votes	%	Seats	Votes	%	Seats	Total seats
African National Congress	26,230	71.54	22	26,887	74.42	11	33
Economic Freedom Fighters	5,679	15.49	0	5,878	16.27	7	7
Congress of the People	1,220	3.33	0	1,117	3.09	2	2
Democratic Alliance	945	2.58	0	956	2.65	1	1
Independent candidates	1,457	3.97	0				0
Abantu Batho Congress	362	0.99	0	322	0.89	1	1
Freedom Front Plus	263	0.72	0	259	0.72	0	0
Party of Action	107	0.29	0	131	0.36	0	0
Patriotic Alliance	102	0.28	0	99	0.27	0	0
African People's Convention	106	0.29	0	93	0.26	0	0
Forum for Service Delivery	64	0.17	0	67	0.19	0	0
Pan Africanist Congress of Azania	41	0.11	0	70	0.19	0	0
Africa Restoration Alliance	30	0.08	0	72	0.20	0	0
Azanian People's Organisation	12	0.03	0	52	0.14	0	0
Kingdom Covenant Democratic Party	1	0.00	0	63	0.17	0	0
Prophetic Movement Army	39	0.11	0	25	0.07	0	0
Agang South Africa	5	0.01	0	40	0.11	0	0
Total	36,663	100.00	22	36,131	100.00	22	44
Valid votes	36,663	98.56		36,131	97.96		
Invalid/blank votes	537	1.44		754	2.04		
Total votes	37,200	100.00		36,885	100.00		
Registered voters/turnout	82,935	44.85		82,935	44.47		

=== By-elections from November 2021 ===
The following by-elections were held to fill vacant ward seats in the period since the election in November 2021.

Date	Ward	Party of the previous councillor	Party of the newly elected councillor
25 January 2023	17	African National Congress	African National Congress
27 September 2023	11	African National Congress	African National Congress

In a ward 17 by-election on 25 January 2023, held after the death of the ANC councillor, the ANC candidate retained the seat for the party with a reduced majority of 51%, from 78% in 2021.
