= Naomi Jacobson =

South African sculptor (1925–2016)

- Born: Naomi Deborah Goldblatt; 1 June 1925; Windhoek, South West Africa
- Died: 2016 (aged 90–91)
- Education: University of Cape Town
- Known for: Sculptor

Naomi Deborah Jacobson (1 June 1925 – 2016), was a sculptor. She was born in Windhoek in South West Africa on 1 June 1925. Her father was Israel Goldblatt, a lawyer and supporter of Namibian independence. She studied at the University of Cape Town where she met and married her husband Larry. They moved to Johannesburg in 1973. During her career she made statues of people including Lord Baden-Powell, Nelson Mandela, Oliver Tambo, the Zulu kings Shaka and Cetshwayo, Steve Biko, and Sir Seretse Khama. She died in 2016.
