= Harold Snyman =

Harold Snyman (23 April 1928 – 1 November 1998) was a major in the South African Security Police.

He led the interrogation of Black Consciousness leader Steve Biko after Biko's arrest in September 1977. He retired with the rank of colonel.

In 1985, he was portrayed in the banned theatre production The Biko Inquest, directed by Saira Essa and Charles Pillay in South Africa. His character was played by a British actor, Andrew Edwards.

After South Africa's transition to democracy, Snyman applied for amnesty from the Truth and Reconciliation Commission. He testified that he and his fellow officers "slammed Steve Biko's head into a wall, chained him crucifixion style to a gate for 24 hours, then covered up the truth about his death", in contrast to an inquest from decades before, where he and others testified that Biko had banged his head against the wall himself. His submission was rejected on the basis of non-disclosure.

He died from skin cancer on 1 November 1998.
