= Kranspoort =

- Location within Limpopo Location within South Africa
- Coordinates: 23.067°S 29.472°E
- Country: South Africa
- Province: Limpopo
- District: Vhembe
- Municipality: Makhado
- Time zone: UTC+2 (SAST)
- PO box: 1080

Kranspoort is a town in the Makhado Local Municipality in the Limpopo province of South Africa.

Kranspoort was a Dutch Reformed Church mission station from the early 1900s. In 2002, the Kranspoort Mission Station was officially handed over by the "Nederduits-Gereformeerde Kerk van Transvaal" to the Kranspoort Communal Committee.

Mamphela Ramphele grew up in Kranspoort.
