= Steve Biko =

South African anti-apartheid activist (1946–1977)

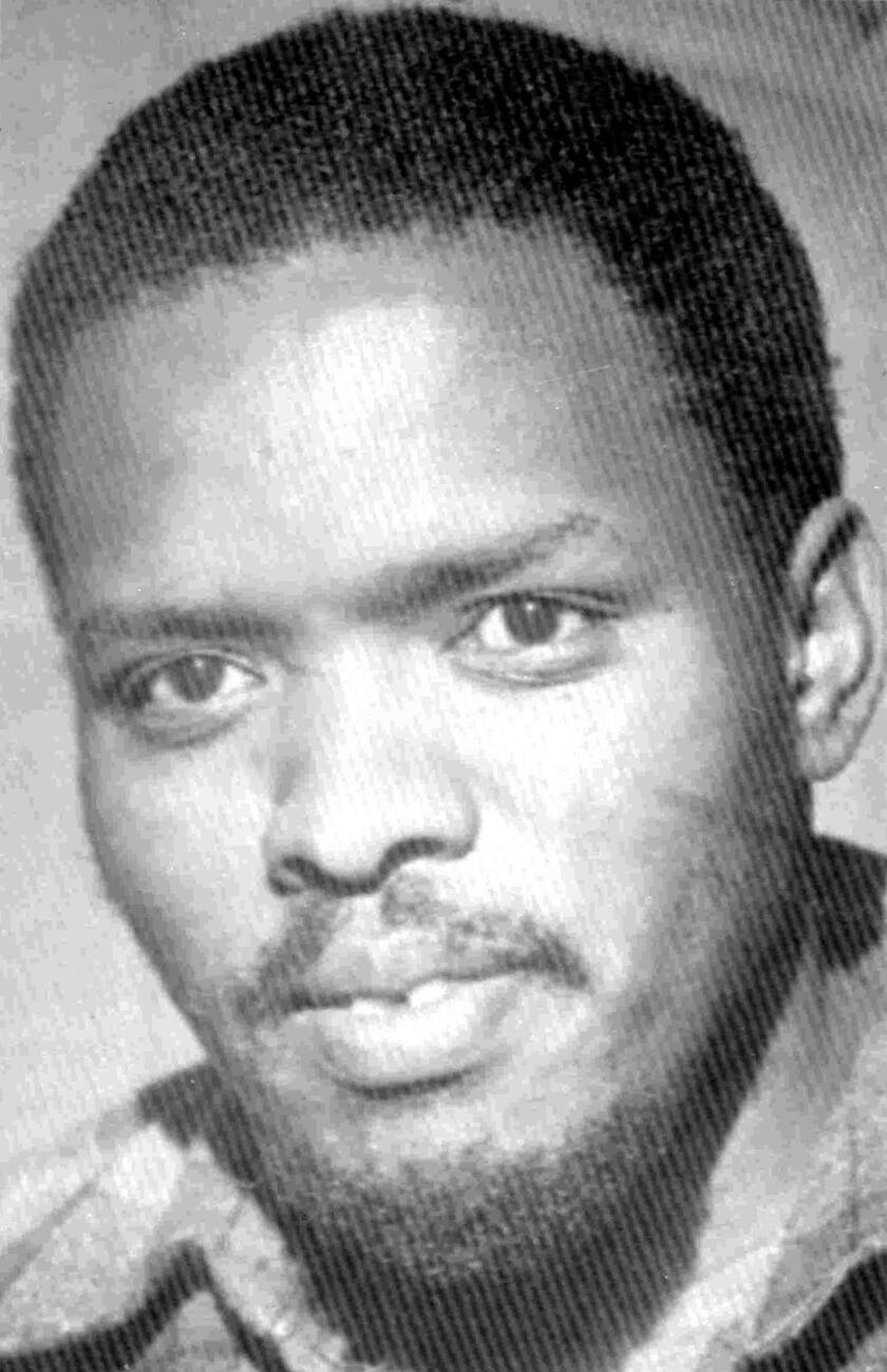
- Born: Bantu Stephen Biko; 18 December 1946; Tarkastad, Cape Province, (Note: Now the Eastern Cape) South Africa
- Died: 12 September 1977 (aged 30); Pretoria, Transvaal, (Note: Now Gauteng) South Africa
- Cause of death: Extensive brain injuries sustained from beatings by South African security officers
- Resting place: Steve Biko Garden of Remembrance, Qonce, Eastern Cape
- Other name: Frank Talk
- Occupation: Anti-apartheid activist
- Organisations: South African Students' Organisation; Black People's Convention
- Spouse: Ntsiki Mashalaba (m. 1970)
- Partner: Mamphela Ramphele
- Children: 5, including Hlumelo

Bantu Stephen Biko OMSG (18 December 1946 – 12 September 1977) was a South African anti-apartheid activist. Ideologically an African nationalist and African socialist, he was at the forefront of a grassroots anti-apartheid campaign known as the Black Consciousness Movement during the late 1960s and 1970s. His ideas were articulated in a series of articles published under the pseudonym Frank Talk.

Raised in a poor Xhosa family, Biko grew up in Ginsberg township in the Eastern Cape. In 1966, he began studying medicine at the University of Natal, where he joined the National Union of South African Students (NUSAS). Strongly opposed to the apartheid system of racial segregation and white-minority rule in South Africa, Biko was frustrated that NUSAS and other anti-apartheid groups were dominated by white liberals, rather than by the blacks who were most affected by apartheid. He believed that well-intentioned white liberals failed to comprehend the black experience and often acted in a paternalistic manner. He developed the view that to avoid white domination, black people had to organise independently, and to this end he became a leading figure in the creation of the South African Students' Organisation (SASO) in 1968. Membership was open only to "Blacks", a term that Biko used in reference not just to Bantu-speaking Africans but also to Coloureds and Indians. He was careful to keep his movement independent of white liberals, but opposed anti-white hatred and had white friends. The white-minority National Party government were initially supportive, seeing SASO's creation as a victory for apartheid's ethos of racial separatism.

Influenced by the Martinican philosopher Frantz Fanon, Biko and his compatriots developed Black Consciousness as SASO's official ideology. The movement campaigned for an end to apartheid and the transition of South Africa toward universal suffrage and a socialist economy. It organised Black Community Programmes (BCPs) and focused on the psychological empowerment of black people. Biko believed that black people needed to rid themselves of any sense of racial inferiority, an idea he expressed by popularizing the slogan "black is beautiful". In 1972, he was involved in founding the Black People's Convention (BPC) to promote Black Consciousness ideas among the wider population. The government came to see Biko as a subversive threat and placed him under a banning order in 1973, severely restricting his activities. He remained politically active, helping organise BCPs such as a healthcare centre and a crèche in the Ginsberg area. During his ban he received repeated anonymous threats, and was detained by state security services on several occasions. Following his arrest in August 1977, Biko was beaten to death by state security officers. Over 20,000 people attended his funeral.

Biko's fame spread posthumously. He became the subject of numerous songs and works of art, while a 1978 biography by his friend Donald Woods formed the basis for the 1987 film Cry Freedom. During Biko's life, the government alleged that he hated whites, various anti-apartheid activists accused him of sexism, and African racial nationalists criticised his united front with Coloureds and Indians. Nonetheless, Biko became one of the earliest icons of the movement against apartheid, and is regarded as a political martyr and the "Father of Black Consciousness". His political legacy remains a matter of contention.

== Biography ==
=== Early life: 1946–1966 ===
Bantu Stephen Biko was born on 18 December 1946, at his grandmother's house in Tarkastad, Cape Province (now the Eastern Cape). The third child of Mzingaye Mathew Biko and Alice 'Mamcete' Biko, he had an older sister, Bukelwa, an older brother, Khaya, and a younger sister, Nobandile. His parents had married in Whittlesea, where his father worked as a police officer. Mzingaye was transferred to Queenstown, Port Elizabeth, Fort Cox, and finally King William's Town, where he and Alice settled in Ginsberg township. This was a settlement of around 800 families, with every four families sharing a water supply and toilet. Both Africans and Coloured people lived in the township, where Xhosa, Afrikaans, and English were all spoken. After resigning from the police force, Mzingaye worked as a clerk in the King William's Town Native Affairs Office, while studying for a law degree by correspondence from the University of South Africa. Alice was employed first in domestic work for local white households, then as a cook at Grey Hospital in King William's Town. According to his sister, it was this observation of his mother's difficult working conditions that resulted in Biko's earliest politicisation.

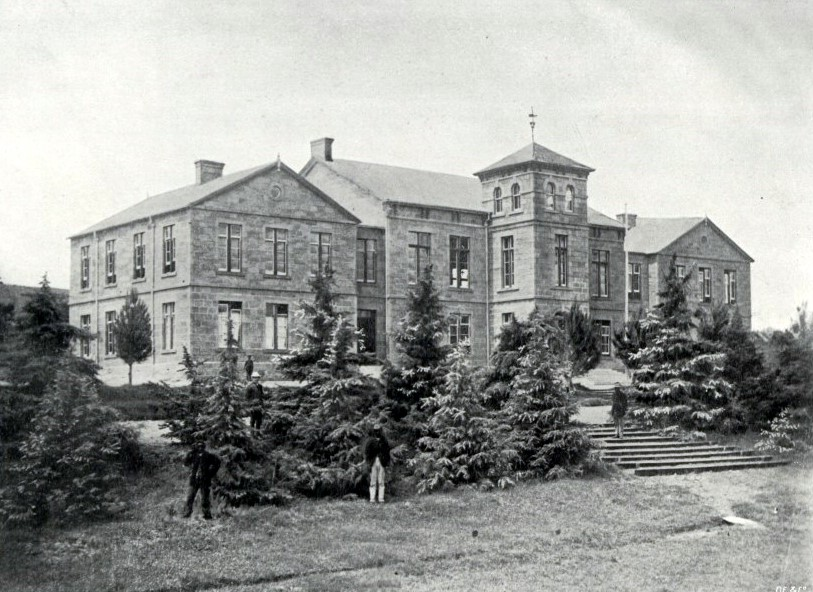
Biko was briefly educated at the Lovedale boarding school in Alice.

Biko's given name "Bantu" means "people" in IsiXhosa; Biko interpreted this in terms of the saying "Umntu ngumntu ngabantu" ("a person is a person by means of other people"). As a child he was nicknamed "Goofy" and "Xwaku-Xwaku", the latter a reference to his unkempt appearance. He was raised in his family's Anglican Christian faith. In 1950, when Biko was four, his father fell ill, was hospitalised in St. Matthew's Hospital, Keiskammahoek, and died, making the family dependent on his mother's income.

Biko spent two years at St. Andrews Primary School and four at Charles Morgan Higher Primary School, both in Ginsberg. Regarded as a particularly intelligent pupil, he was allowed to skip a year. In 1963 he transferred to the Forbes Grant Secondary School in the township. Biko excelled at maths and English and topped the class in his exams. In 1964 the Ginsberg community offered him a bursary to join his brother Khaya as a student at Lovedale, a prestigious boarding school in Alice, Eastern Cape. Within three months of Steve's arrival, Khaya was accused of having connections to Poqo, the armed wing of the Pan Africanist Congress (PAC), an African nationalist group which the government had banned. Both Khaya and Steve were arrested and interrogated by the police; the former was convicted, then acquitted on appeal. No clear evidence of Steve's connection to Poqo was presented, but he was expelled from Lovedale. Commenting later on this situation, he stated: "I began to develop an attitude which was much more directed at authority than at anything else. I hated authority like hell."

From 1964 to 1965, Biko studied at St. Francis College, a Catholic boarding school in Mariannhill, Natal. The college had a liberal political culture, and Biko developed his political consciousness there. He became particularly interested in the replacement of South Africa's white minority government with an administration that represented the country's black majority. Among the anti-colonialist leaders who became Biko's heroes at this time were Algeria's Ahmed Ben Bella and Kenya's Jaramogi Oginga Odinga. He later said that most of the "politicos" in his family were sympathetic to the PAC, which had anti-communist and African racialist ideas. Biko admired what he described as the PAC's "terribly good organisation" and the courage of many of its members, but he remained unconvinced by its racially exclusionary approach, believing that members of all racial groups should unite against the government. In December 1964, he travelled to Zwelitsha for the ulwaluko circumcision ceremony, symbolically marking his transition from boyhood to manhood.

=== Early student activism: 1966–1968 ===
Biko was initially interested in studying law at university, but many of those around him discouraged this, believing that law was too closely intertwined with political activism. Instead they convinced him to choose medicine, a subject thought to have better career prospects. He secured a scholarship, and in 1966 entered the University of Natal Medical School. There, he joined what his biographer Xolela Mangcu called "a peculiarly sophisticated and cosmopolitan group of students" from across South Africa; many of them later held prominent roles in the post-apartheid era. The late 1960s was the heyday of radical student politics across the world, as reflected in the protests of 1968, and Biko was eager to involve himself in this environment. Soon after he arrived at the university, he was elected to the Students' Representative Council (SRC).

The university's SRC was affiliated with the National Union of South African Students (NUSAS). NUSAS had taken pains to cultivate a multi-racial membership but remained white-dominated because the majority of South Africa's students were from the country's white minority. As Clive Nettleton, a white NUSAS leader, put it: "the essence of the matter is that NUSAS was founded on white initiative, is financed by white money and reflects the opinions of the majority of its members who are white". NUSAS officially opposed apartheid, but it moderated its opposition in order to maintain the support of conservative white students. Biko and several other black African NUSAS members were frustrated when it organised parties in white dormitories, which black Africans were forbidden to enter. In July 1967, a NUSAS conference was held at Rhodes University in Grahamstown; after the students arrived, they found that dormitory accommodation had been arranged for the white and Indian delegates but not the black Africans, who were told that they could sleep in a local church. Biko and other black African delegates walked out of the conference in anger. Biko later related that this event forced him to rethink his belief in the multi-racial approach to political activism:

I realized that for a long time I had been holding onto this whole dogma of nonracism almost like a religion ... But in the course of that debate I began to feel there was a lot lacking in the proponents of the nonracist idea ... they had this problem, you know, of superiority, and they tended to take us for granted and wanted us to accept things that were second-class. They could not see why we could not consider staying in that church, and I began to feel that our understanding of our own situation in this country was not coincidental with that of these liberal whites.

=== Founding the South African Students' Organisation: 1968–1972 ===
==== Developing SASO ====
Following the 1968 NUSAS conference in Johannesburg, many of its members attended a July 1968 conference of the University Christian Movement at Stutterheim. There, the black African members decided to hold a December conference to discuss the formation of an independent black student group. The South African Students' Organisation (SASO) was officially launched at a July 1969 conference at the University of the North; there, the group's constitution and basic policy platform were adopted. The group's focus was on the need for contact between centres of black student activity, including through sport, cultural activities, and debating competitions. Though Biko played a substantial role in SASO's creation, he sought a low public profile during its early stages, believing that this would strengthen its second level of leadership, such as his ally Barney Pityana. Nonetheless, he was elected as SASO's first president; Pat Matshaka was elected vice president and Wuila Mashalaba elected secretary. Durban became its de facto headquarters.

Like Black Power in the United States, South Africa's "Black Consciousness movement" was grounded in the belief that African-descendant peoples had to overcome the enormous psychological and cultural damage imposed on them by a succession of white racist domains, such as enslavement and colonialism. Drawing upon the writings and speeches of Frantz Fanon, Aimé Césaire, and Malcolm X, advocates of Black Consciousness supported cultural and social activities that promoted a knowledge of black protest history. They actively promoted the establishment of independent, black-owned institutions, and favored radical reforms within school curricula that nurtured a positive black identity for young people.

— Manning Marable and Peniel Joseph

Biko developed SASO's ideology of "Black Consciousness" in conversation with other black student leaders. A SASO policy manifesto produced in July 1971 defined this ideology as "an attitude of mind, a way of life. The basic tenet of Black Consciousness is that the Blackman must reject all value systems that seek to make him a foreigner in the country of his birth and reduce his basic human dignity." Black Consciousness centred on psychological empowerment, through combating the feelings of inferiority that most black South Africans exhibited. Biko believed that, as part of the struggle against apartheid and white-minority rule, blacks should affirm their own humanity by regarding themselves as worthy of freedom and its attendant responsibilities. It applied the term "black" not only to Bantu-speaking Africans, but also to Indians and Coloureds. SASO adopted this term over "non-white" because its leadership felt that defining themselves in opposition to white people was not a positive self-description. Biko promoted the slogan "black is beautiful", explaining that this meant "Man, you are okay as you are. Begin to look upon yourself as a human being."

Biko presented a paper on "White Racism and Black Consciousness" at an academic conference in the University of Cape Town's Abe Bailey Centre in January 1971. He also expanded on his ideas in a column written for the SASO Newsletter under the pseudonym "Frank Talk". His tenure as president was taken up largely by fundraising activities, and involved travelling around various campuses in South Africa to recruit students and deepen the movement's ideological base. Some of these students censured him for abandoning NUSAS' multi-racial approach; others disapproved of SASO's decision to allow Indian and Coloured students to be members. Biko stepped down from the presidency after a year, insisting that it was necessary for a new leadership to emerge and thus avoid any cult of personality forming around him.

SASO decided after a debate to remain non-affiliated with NUSAS, but would nevertheless recognise the larger organisation as the national student body. One of SASO's founding resolutions was to send a representative to each NUSAS conference. In 1970 SASO withdrew its recognition of NUSAS, accusing it of attempting to hinder SASO's growth on various campuses. SASO's split from NUSAS was a traumatic experience for many white liberal youth who had committed themselves to the idea of a multi-racial organisation and felt that their attempts were being rebuffed. The NUSAS leadership regretted the split, but largely refrained from criticising SASO. The government – which regarded multi-racial liberalism as a threat and had banned multi-racial political parties in 1968 – was pleased with SASO's emergence, regarding it as a victory of apartheid thinking.

==== Attitude to liberalism and personal relations ====
The early focus of the Black Consciousness Movement (BCM) was on criticising anti-racist white liberals and liberalism itself, accusing it of paternalism and being a "negative influence" on black Africans. In one of his first published articles, Biko stated that although he was "not sneering at the [white] liberals and their involvement" in the anti-apartheid movement, "one has to come to the painful conclusion that the [white] liberal is in fact appeasing his own conscience, or at best is eager to demonstrate his identification with the black people only insofar as it does not sever all ties with his relatives on his side of the colour line."

Biko and SASO were openly critical of NUSAS' protests against government policies. Biko argued that NUSAS merely sought to influence the white electorate; in his opinion, this electorate was not legitimate, and protests targeting a particular policy would be ineffective for the ultimate aim of dismantling the apartheid state. SASO regarded student marches, pickets, and strikes to be ineffective and stated it would withdraw from public forms of protest. It deliberately avoided open confrontation with the state until such a point when it had a sufficiently large institutional structure. Instead, SASO's focus was on establishing community projects and spreading Black Consciousness ideas among other black organisations and the wider black community. Despite this policy, in May 1972 it issued the Alice Declaration, in which it called for students to boycott lectures in response to the expulsion of SASO member Abram Onkgopotse Tiro from the University of the North after he made a speech criticising its administration. The Tiro incident convinced the government that SASO was a threat.

In Durban, Biko entered a relationship with a nurse, Nontsikelelo "Ntsiki" Mashalaba; they married at the King William's Town magistrates court in December 1970. Their first child, Nkosinathi, was born in 1971. Biko initially did well in his university studies, but his grades declined as he devoted increasing time to political activism. Six years after starting his degree, he found himself repeating his third year. In 1972, as a result of his poor academic performance, the University of Natal barred him from further study.

=== Black Consciousness activities and Biko's banning: 1971–1977 ===
==== Black People's Convention ====
In August 1971, Biko attended a conference on "The Development of the African Community" in Edendale. There, a resolution was presented calling for the formation of the Black People's Convention (BPC), a vehicle for the promotion of Black Consciousness among the wider population. Biko voted in favour of the group's creation but expressed reservations about the lack of consultation with South Africa's Coloureds or Indians. A. Mayatula became the BPC's first president; Biko did not stand for any leadership positions. The group was formally launched in July 1972 in Pietermaritzburg. By 1973, it had 41 branches and 4000 members, sharing much of its membership with SASO.

My major problem at this moment is a strange kind of guilt. So many friends of mine have been arrested for activities in something that I was most instrumental in starting. A lot of them are blokes I spoke into the movement. And yet I am not with them. One does not think this way in political life of course. Casualties are expected and should be bargained for.

— Steve Biko

While the BPC was primarily political, Black Consciousness activists also established the Black Community Programmes (BCPs) to focus on improving healthcare and education and fostering black economic self-reliance. The BCPs had strong ecumenical links, being part-funded by a program on Christian action, established by the Christian Institute of Southern Africa and the South African Council of Churches. Additional funds came from the Anglo-American Corporation, the International University Exchange Fund, and Scandinavian churches. In 1972, the BCP hired Biko and Bokwe Mafuna, allowing Biko to continue his political and community work. In September 1972, Biko visited Kimberley, where he met the PAC founder and anti-apartheid activist Robert Sobukwe.

Biko's banning order in 1973 prevented him from working officially for the BCPs from which he had previously earned a small stipend, but he helped to set up a new BPC branch in Ginsberg, which held its first meeting in the church of a sympathetic white clergyman, David Russell. Establishing a more permanent headquarters in Leopold Street, the branch served as a base from which to form new BCPs; these included self-help schemes such as classes in literacy, dressmaking and health education. For Biko, community development was part of the process of infusing black people with a sense of pride and dignity. Near King William's Town, a BCP Zanempilo Clinic was established to serve as a healthcare centre catering for rural black people who would not otherwise have access to hospital facilities. He helped to revive the Ginsberg crèche, a daycare for children of working mothers, and establish a Ginsberg education fund to raise bursaries for promising local students. He helped establish Njwaxa Home Industries, a leather goods company providing jobs for local women. In 1975, he co-founded the Zimele Trust, a fund for the families of political prisoners.

Biko endorsed the unification of South Africa's black liberationist groups – among them the BCM, PAC, and African National Congress (ANC) – in order to concentrate their anti-apartheid efforts. To this end, he reached out to leading members of the ANC, PAC, and Unity Movement. His communications with the ANC were largely via Griffiths Mxenge, and plans were being made to smuggle him out of the country to meet Oliver Tambo, a leading ANC figure. Biko's negotiations with the PAC were primarily through intermediaries who exchanged messages between him and Sobukwe; those with the Unity Movement were largely via Fikile Bam.

==== Banning order ====
By 1973, the government regarded Black Consciousness as a threat. It sought to disrupt Biko's activities, and in March 1973 placed a banning order on him. This prevented him from leaving the King William's Town magisterial district, prohibited him from speaking either in public or to more than one person at a time, barred his membership of political organisations, and forbade the media from quoting him. As a result, he returned to Ginsberg, living initially in his mother's house and later in his own residence.

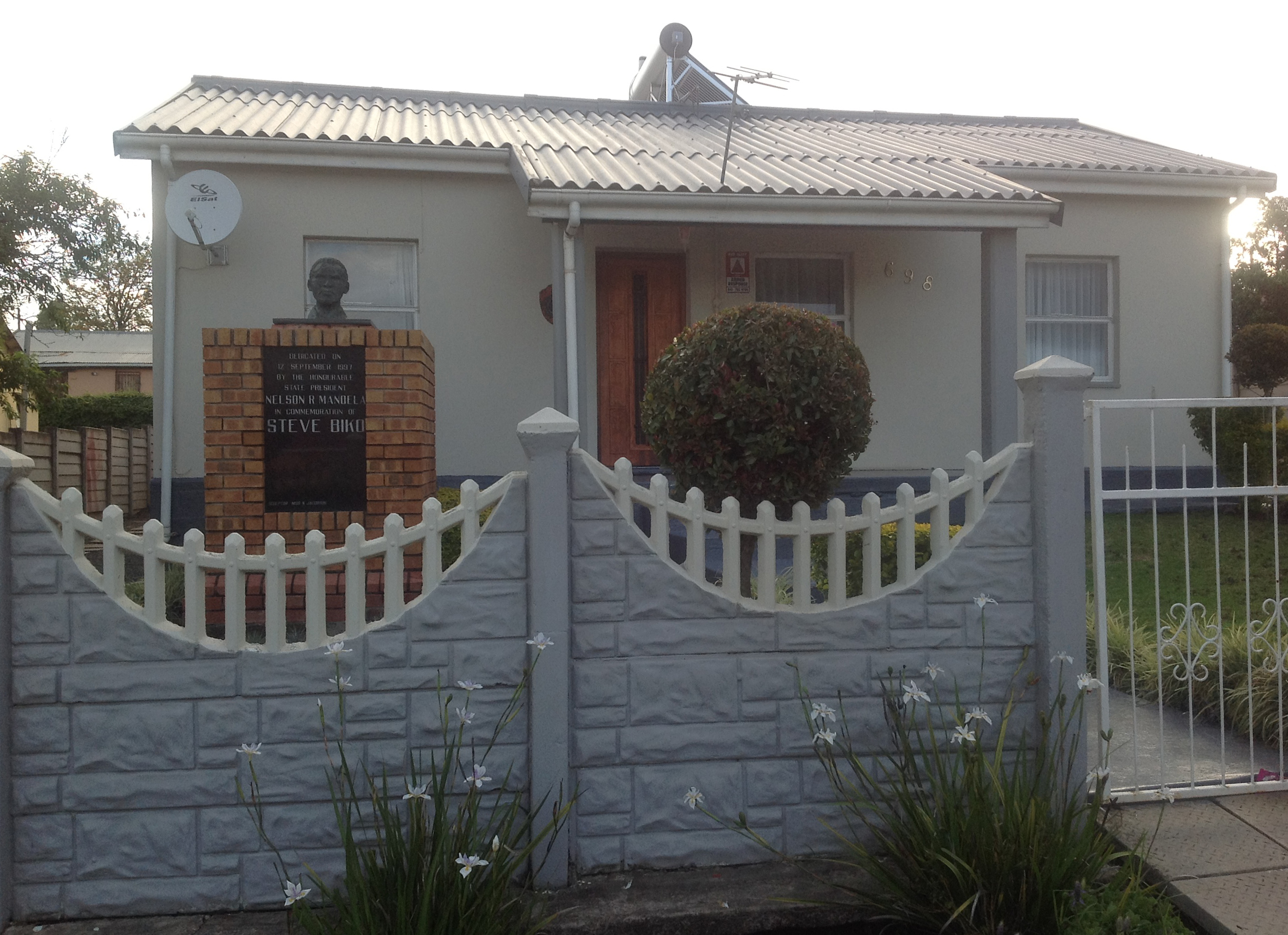
Steve Biko's house in Ginsberg, Eastern Cape

In December 1975, attempting to circumvent the restrictions of the banning order, the BPC declared Biko their honorary president. After Biko and other BCM leaders were banned, a new leadership arose, led by Muntu Myeza and Sathasivian Cooper, who were considered part of the Durban Moment. Myeza and Cooper organised a BCM demonstration to mark Mozambique's independence from Portuguese colonial rule in 1975. Biko disagreed with this action, correctly predicting that the government would use it to crack down on the BCM. The government arrested around 200 BCM activists, nine of whom were brought before the Supreme Court, accused of subversion by intent. The state claimed that Black Consciousness philosophy was likely to cause "racial confrontation" and therefore threatened public safety. Biko was called as a witness for the defence; he sought to refute the state's accusations by outlining the movement's aims and development. Ultimately, the accused were convicted and imprisoned on Robben Island.

In 1973, Biko had enrolled for a law degree by correspondence from the University of South Africa. He passed several exams, but had not completed the degree at his time of death. His performance on the course was poor; he was absent from several exams and failed his Practical Afrikaans module. The state security services repeatedly sought to intimidate him; he received anonymous threatening phone calls, and gun shots were fired at his house. A group of young men calling themselves 'The Cubans' began guarding him from these attacks. The security services detained him four times, once for 101 days. With the ban preventing him from gaining employment, the strained economic situation impacted his marriage.

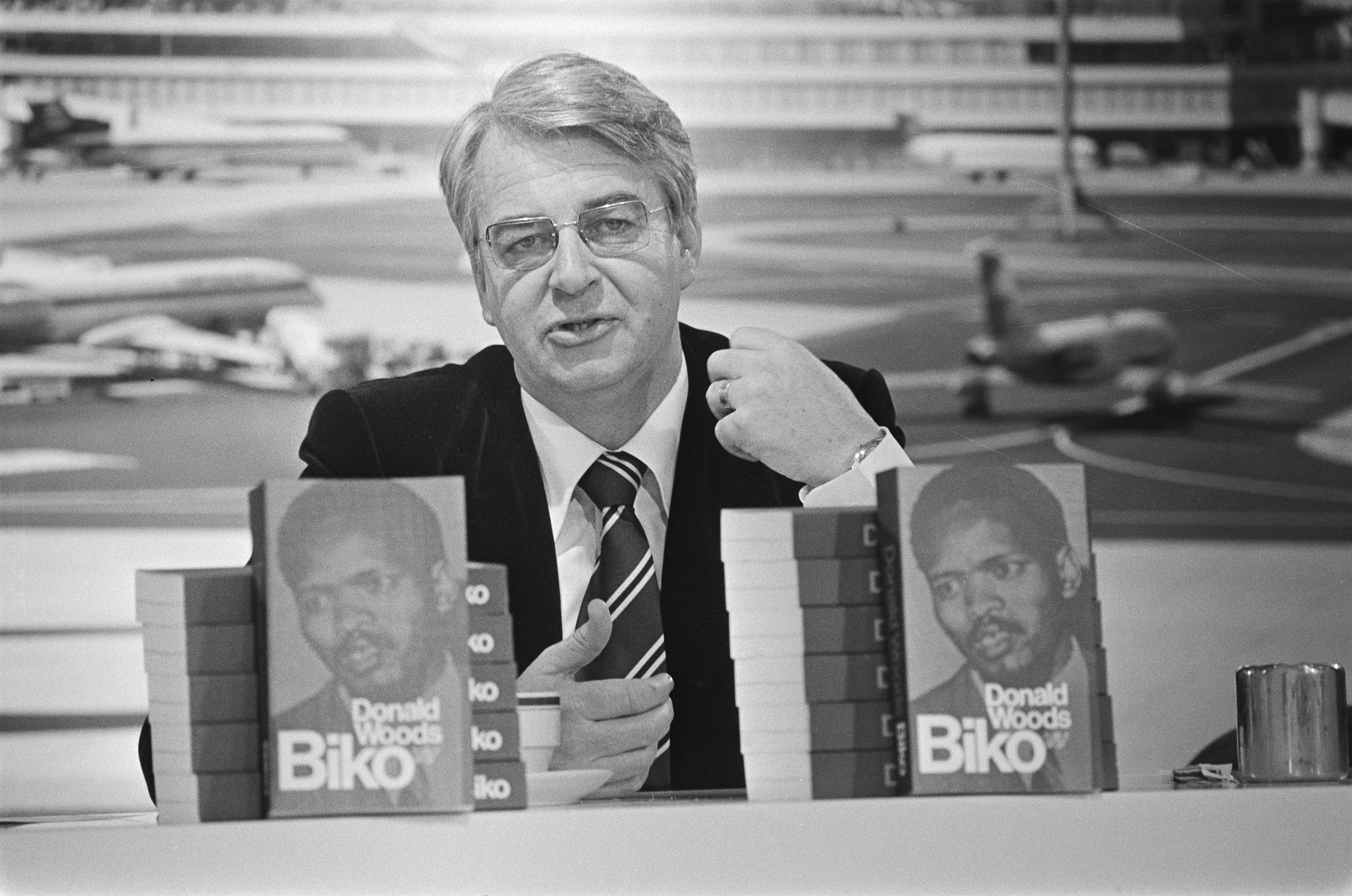
Biko became a close friend of white liberal activist Donald Woods, who wrote a book about Biko after his death.

During his ban, Biko asked for a meeting with Donald Woods, the white liberal editor of the Daily Dispatch. Under Woods' editorship, the newspaper had published articles criticising apartheid and the white-minority regime and had also given space to the views of various black groups, but not the BCM. Biko hoped to convince Woods to give the movement greater coverage and an outlet for its views. Woods was initially reticent, believing that Biko and the BCM advocated "for racial exclusivism in reverse". When he met Biko for the first time, Woods expressed his concern about the anti-white liberal sentiment of Biko's early writings. Biko acknowledged that his earlier "antiliberal" writings were "overkill", but said that he remained committed to the basic message contained within them.

Over the coming years the pair became close friends. Woods later related that, although he continued to have concerns about "the unavoidably racist aspects of Black Consciousness", it was "both a revelation and education" to socialise with blacks who had "psychologically emancipated attitudes". Biko also remained friends with another prominent white liberal, Duncan Innes, who served as NUSAS President in 1969; Innes later commented that Biko was "invaluable in helping me to understand black oppression, not only socially and politically, but also psychologically and intellectually". Biko's friendship with these white liberals came under criticism from some members of the BCM.

=== Death: 1977 ===
==== Arrest and death ====
In 1977, Biko broke his banning order by travelling to Cape Town, hoping to meet Unity Movement leader Neville Alexander and deal with growing dissent in the Western Cape branch of the BCM, which was dominated by Marxists like Johnny Issel. Biko drove to the city with his friend Peter Jones on 17 August, but Alexander refused to meet with Biko, fearing that he was being monitored by the police. Biko and Jones drove back toward King William's Town, but on 18 August they were stopped at a police roadblock near Grahamstown. Biko was arrested for having violated the order restricting him to King William's Town. Unsubstantiated claims have been made that the security services were aware of Biko's trip to Cape Town and that the road block had been erected to catch him. Jones was also arrested at the roadblock; he was subsequently held without trial for 533 days, during which time he was interrogated on numerous occasions.

The security services took Biko to the Walmer police station in Port Elizabeth, where he was held naked in a cell with his legs in shackles. On 6 September, he was transferred from Walmer to room 619 of the security police headquarters in the Sanlam Building in central Port Elizabeth, where he was interrogated for 22 hours, handcuffed and in shackles, and chained to a grille. Exactly what happened has never been ascertained, but during the interrogation he was severely beaten by at least one of the ten security police officers. He suffered three brain lesions that resulted in a massive brain haemorrhage on 6 September. Following this incident, Biko's captors forced him to remain standing and shackled to the wall. The police later said that Biko had attacked one of them with a chair, forcing them to subdue him and place him in handcuffs and leg irons.

Biko was examined by a doctor, Ivor Lang, who stated that there was no evidence of injury on Biko. Later scholarship has suggested Biko's injuries must have been obvious. He was then examined by two other doctors who, after a test showed blood cells to have entered Biko's spinal fluid, agreed that he should be transported to a prison hospital in Pretoria. On 11 September, police loaded him into the back of a Land Rover, naked and manacled, and drove him 740 miles (1,190 km) to the hospital. There, Biko died alone in a cell on 12 September 1977. According to an autopsy, an "extensive brain injury" had caused "centralisation of the blood circulation to such an extent that there had been intravasal blood coagulation, acute kidney failure, and uremia". He was the twenty-first person to die in a South African prison in twelve months, and the forty-sixth political detainee to die during interrogation since the government introduced laws permitting imprisonment without trial in 1963.

==== Response and investigation ====
News of Biko's death spread quickly across the world, and became symbolic of the abuses of the apartheid system. His death attracted more global attention than he had ever attained during his lifetime. Protest meetings were held in several cities; many were shocked that the security authorities would kill such a prominent dissident leader. Biko's Anglican funeral service, held on 25 September 1977 at King William's Town's Victoria Stadium, took five hours and was attended by around 20,000 people. The vast majority were black, but a few hundred whites also attended, including Biko's friends, such as Russell and Woods, and prominent progressive figures like Helen Suzman, Alex Boraine, and Zach de Beer. Foreign diplomats from thirteen nations were present, as was an Anglican delegation headed by Bishop Desmond Tutu. The event was later described as "the first mass political funeral in the country". Biko's coffin had been decorated with the motifs of a clenched black fist, the African continent, and the statement "One Azania, One Nation"; Azania was the name that many activists wanted South Africa to adopt after apartheid. Biko was buried in the cemetery at Ginsberg. Two BCM-affiliated artists, Dikobé Ben Martins and Robin Holmes, produced a T-shirt marking the event; the design was banned the following year. Martins also created a commemorative poster for the funeral, the first in a tradition of funeral posters that proved popular throughout the 1980s.

Biko's coffin featured the motif of a clenched black fist. Many in the Black Consciousness Movement used this fist as a symbol.

Speaking publicly about Biko's death, the country's police minister Jimmy Kruger initially implied that it had been the result of a hunger strike, a statement he later denied. His account was challenged by some of Biko's friends, including Woods, who said that Biko had told them that he would never kill himself in prison. Publicly, he stated that Biko had been plotting violence, a claim repeated in the pro-government press. South Africa's attorney general initially stated that no one would be prosecuted for Biko's death. Two weeks after the funeral, the government banned all Black Consciousness organisations, including the BCP, which had its assets seized.

Both domestic and international pressure called for a public inquest to be held, to which the government agreed. It began in Pretoria's Old Synagogue courthouse in November 1977, and lasted for three weeks. Both the running of the inquest and the quality of evidence submitted came in for extensive criticism. An observer from the Lawyers' Committee for Civil Rights Under Law stated that the affidavit's statements were "sometimes redundant, sometimes inconsistent, frequently ambiguous"; David Napley described the police investigation of the incident as "perfunctory in the extreme". The security forces alleged that Biko had acted aggressively and had sustained his injuries in a scuffle, in which he had banged his head against the cell wall. The presiding magistrate accepted the security forces' account of events and refused to prosecute any of those involved.

The verdict was treated with scepticism by much of the international media and the US Government led by President Jimmy Carter. On 2 February 1978, based on the evidence given at the inquest, the attorney general of the Eastern Cape stated that he would not prosecute the officers. After the inquest, Biko's family brought a civil case against the state; at the advice of their lawyers, they agreed to a settlement of R65,000 (US$78,000) in July 1979. Shortly after the inquest, the South African Medical and Dental Council initiated proceedings against the medical professionals who had been entrusted with Biko's care; eight years later two of the medics were found guilty of improper conduct. The failure of the government-employed doctors to diagnose or treat Biko's injuries has been frequently cited as an example of a repressive state influencing medical practitioners' decisions, and Biko's death as evidence of the need for doctors to serve the needs of patients before those of the state.

After the abolition of apartheid and the establishment of a majority government in 1994, a Truth and Reconciliation Commission was established to investigate past human-rights abuses. The commission made plans to investigate Biko's death, but his family petitioned against this on the grounds that the commission could grant amnesty to those responsible, thereby preventing the family's right to justice and redress. In 1996, the Constitutional Court ruled against the family, allowing the investigation to proceed. Five police officers (Harold Snyman, Gideon Nieuwoudt, Ruben Marx, Daantjie Siebert, and Johan Beneke) appeared before the commission and requested amnesty in return for information about the events surrounding Biko's death. In December 1998, the Commission refused amnesty to the five men; this was because their accounts were conflicting and thus deemed untruthful, and because Biko's killing had no clear political motive, but seemed to have been motivated by "ill-will or spite". In October 2003, South Africa's justice ministry announced that the five policemen would not be prosecuted because the statute of limitations had elapsed and there was insufficient evidence to secure a prosecution. In 2025, the South African government reopened an investigation into Biko's death. The inquest proceedings began in August 2026.

== Ideology ==
The ideas of the Black Consciousness Movement were not developed solely by Biko, but through lengthy discussions with other black students who were rejecting white liberalism. Biko was influenced by his reading of authors like Frantz Fanon, Malcolm X, Léopold Sédar Senghor, James Cone, and Paulo Freire. The Martinique-born Fanon, in particular, has been cited as a profound influence over Biko's ideas about liberation. Biko's biographer Xolela Mangcu cautioned that it would be wrong to reduce Biko's thought to an interpretation of Fanon, and that the impact of "the political and intellectual history of the Eastern Cape" had to be appreciated too. Additional influences on Black Consciousness were the United States–based Black Power movement, and forms of Christianity like the activist-oriented black theology.

=== Black Consciousness and empowerment ===
Biko rejected the apartheid government's division of South Africa's population into "whites" and "non-whites", a distinction that was marked on signs and buildings throughout the country. Building on Fanon's work, Biko regarded "non-white" as a negative category, defining people in terms of an absence of whiteness. In response, Biko replaced "non-white" with the category "black", which he regarded as being neither derivative nor negative. He defined blackness as a "mental attitude" rather than a "matter of pigmentation", referring to "blacks" as "those who are by law or tradition politically, economically and socially discriminated against as a group in the South African society" and who identify "themselves as a unit in the struggle towards the realization of their aspirations". In this way, he and the Black Consciousness Movement used "black" in reference not only to Bantu-speaking Africans but also to Coloureds and Indians, who together made up almost 90% of South Africa's population in the 1970s. Biko was not a Marxist and believed that it was oppression based on race, rather than class, which would be the main political motivation for change in South Africa. He argued that those on the "white left" often promoted a class-based analysis as a "defence mechanism... primarily because they want to detach us from anything relating to race. In case it has a rebound effect on them because they are white".

Black Consciousness directs itself to the black man and to his situation, and the black man is subjected to two forces in this country. He is first of all oppressed by an external world through institutionalised machinery and through laws that restrict him from doing certain things, through heavy work conditions, through poor pay, through difficult living conditions, through poor education, these are all external to him. Secondly, and this we regard as the most important, the black man in himself has developed a certain state of alienation, he rejects himself precisely because he attaches the meaning white to all that is good, in other words he equates good with white. This arises out of his living and it arises out of his development from childhood.

— Steve Biko

Biko saw white racism in South Africa as the totality of the white power structure. He argued that under apartheid, white people not only participated in the oppression of black people but were also the main voices in opposition to that oppression. He thus argued that in dominating both the apartheid system and the anti-apartheid movement, white people totally controlled the political arena, leaving black people marginalised. He believed white people were able to dominate the anti-apartheid movement because of their access to resources, education, and privilege. He nevertheless thought that white South Africans were poorly suited to this role because they had not personally experienced the oppression that their black counterparts faced.

Biko and his comrades regarded multi-racial anti-apartheid groups as unwittingly replicating the structure of apartheid because they contained whites in dominant positions of control. For this reason, Biko and the others did not participate in these multi-racial organisations. Instead, they called for an anti-apartheid programme that was controlled by black people. Although he called on sympathetic whites to reject any concept that they themselves could be spokespeople for the black majority, Biko nevertheless believed that they had a place in the anti-apartheid struggle, asking them to focus their efforts on convincing the wider white community on the inevitability of apartheid's fall. Biko clarified his position to Woods: "I don't reject liberalism as such or white liberals as such. I reject only the concept that black liberation can be achieved through the leadership of white liberals." He added that "the [white] liberal is no enemy, he's a friend – but for the moment he holds us back, offering a formula too gentle, too inadequate for our struggle".

Biko's approach to activism focused on psychological empowerment, and both he and the BCM saw their main purpose as combating the feeling of inferiority that most black South Africans experienced. Biko expressed dismay at how "the black man has become a shell, a shadow of man ... bearing the yoke of oppression with sheepish timidity", and stated that "the most potent weapon in the hands of the oppressor is the mind of the oppressed". He believed that blacks needed to affirm their own humanity by overcoming their fears and believing themselves worthy of freedom and its attendant responsibilities. He defined Black Consciousness as "an inward-looking process" that would "infuse people with pride and dignity". To promote this, the BCM adopted the slogan "Black is Beautiful".

One of the ways that Biko and the BCM sought to achieve psychological empowerment was through community development. Community projects were seen not only as a way to alleviate poverty in black communities but also as a means of transforming society psychologically, culturally, and economically. They would also help students to learn about the "daily struggles" of ordinary black people and to spread Black Consciousness ideas among the population. Among the projects that SASO set its members to conduct in the holidays were repairs to schools, housebuilding, and instructions on financial management and agricultural techniques. Healthcare was also a priority, with SASO members focusing on primary and preventative care.

=== Foreign and domestic relations ===
It becomes more necessary to see the truth as it is if you realise that the only vehicle for change are these people who have lost their personality. The first step therefore is to make the black man come to himself; to pump back life into his empty shell; to infuse him with pride and dignity, to remind him of his complicity in the crime of allowing himself to be mis-used and therefore letting evil reign supreme in the land of his birth. That is what we mean by an inward-looking process. This is the definition of Black Consciousness.

— Steve Biko

Biko opposed any collaboration with the apartheid government, such as the agreements that the Coloured and Indian communities made with the regime. In his view, the Bantustan system was "the greatest single fraud ever invented by white politicians", stating that it was designed to divide the Bantu-speaking African population along tribal lines. He openly criticised the Zulu leader Mangosuthu Buthelezi, stating that the latter's co-operation with the South African government "[diluted] the cause" of black liberation. He believed that those fighting apartheid in South Africa should link with anti-colonial struggles elsewhere in the world and with activists in the global African diaspora combating racial prejudice and discrimination. He also hoped that foreign countries would boycott South Africa's economy.

Biko believed that while apartheid and white-minority rule continued, "sporadic outbursts" of violence against the white minority were inevitable. He wanted to avoid violence, stating that "if at all possible, we want the revolution to be peaceful and reconciliatory". He noted that views on violence differed widely within the BCM – which contained both pacifists and believers in violent revolution – although the group had agreed to operate peacefully, and unlike the PAC and ANC, had no armed wing.

A staunch anti-imperialist, Biko saw the South African situation as a "microcosm" of the broader "black–white power struggle" which manifests as "the global confrontation between the Third World and the rich white nations of the world". He was suspicious of the Soviet Union's motives in supporting African liberation movements, relating that "Russia is as imperialistic as America", although he acknowledged that "in the eyes of the Third World they have a cleaner slate". He also acknowledged that the material assistance provided by the Soviets was "more valuable" to the anti-apartheid cause than the "speeches and wrist-slapping" provided by Western governments. He was cautious of the possibility of a post-apartheid South Africa getting caught up in the imperialist Cold War rivalries of the United States and the Soviet Union.

=== On a post-apartheid society ===
Biko hoped that a future socialist South Africa could become a completely non-racial society, with people of all ethnic backgrounds living peacefully together in a "joint culture" that combined the best of all communities. He did not support guarantees of minority rights, believing that doing so would continue to recognise divisions along racial lines. Instead he supported a one person, one vote system. Initially arguing that one-party states were appropriate for Africa, he developed a more positive view of multi-party systems after conversations with Woods. He saw individual liberty as desirable, but regarded it as a lesser priority than access to food, employment, and social security.

Black, said Biko, is not a colour; Black is an experience. If you are oppressed, you are Black. In the South African context, this was truly revolutionary. Biko's subsidiary message was that the unity of the oppressed could not be achieved through clandestine armed struggle; it had to be achieved in the open, through a peaceful but militant struggle.

— Mahmood Mamdani

Biko was neither a communist nor capitalist. Described as a proponent of African socialism, he called for "a socialist solution that is an authentic expression of black communalism". This idea was derided by some of his Marxist contemporaries, but later found parallels in the ideas of the Mexican Zapatistas. Noting that there was significant inequality in the distribution of wealth in South Africa, Biko believed that a socialist society was necessary to ensure social justice. In his view, this required a move towards a mixed economy that allowed private enterprise but in which all land was owned by the state and in which state industries played a significant part in forestry, mining, and commerce. He believed that, if post-apartheid South Africa remained capitalist, some black people would join the bourgeoisie but inequality and poverty would remain. As he put it, if South Africa transitioned to proportional democracy without socialist economic reforms, then "it would not change the position of economic oppression of the blacks".

In conversation with Woods, Biko insisted that the BCM would not degenerate into anti-white hatred "because it isn't a negative, hating thing. It's a positive black self-confidence thing involving no hatred of anyone". He acknowledged that a "fringe element" may retain "anti-white bitterness"; he added: "we'll do what we can to restrain that, but frankly it's not one of our top priorities or one of our major concerns. Our main concern is the liberation of the blacks." Elsewhere, Biko argued that it was the responsibility of a vanguard movement to ensure that, in a post-apartheid society, the black majority would not seek vengeance upon the white minority. He stated that this would require an education of the black population in order to teach them how to live in a non-racial society.

== Personal life and personality ==
Tall and slim in his youth, by his twenties Biko was over six feet tall, with the "bulky build of a heavyweight boxer carrying more weight than when in peak condition", according to Woods. His friends regarded him as "handsome, fearless, a brilliant thinker". Woods saw him as "unusually gifted ... His quick brain, superb articulation of ideas and sheer mental force were highly impressive." According to Biko's friend Trudi Thomas, with Biko "you had a remarkable sense of being in the presence of a great mind". Woods felt that Biko "could enable one to share his vision" with "an economy of words" because "he seemed to communicate ideas through extraverbal media – almost psychically." Biko exhibited what Woods referred to as "a new style of leadership", never proclaiming himself to be a leader and discouraging any cult of personality from growing up around him. Other activists did regard him as a leader and often deferred to him at meetings. When engaged in conversations, he displayed an interest in listening and often drew out the thoughts of others.

The charisma of Steve Biko was entirely his own. He had from an early age the unmistakable bearing and quality of a unique leader. I say unique because his style of leadership was his own – it was un-pushy, un-promotional, yet immediately acknowledged by his peers ... I was thirteen years older than Steve, yet I always had the feeling I was talking to someone older and wiser, and like many others I often sought his advice on all manner of problems.

— Donald Woods

Biko and many others in his activist circle had an antipathy toward luxury items because most South African blacks could not afford them. He owned few clothes and dressed in a low-key manner. He had a large record collection and particularly liked gumba. He enjoyed parties, and according to his biographer Linda Wilson, he often drank substantial quantities of alcohol. Religion did not play a central role in his life. He was often critical of the established Christian churches, but remained a believer in God and found meaning in the Gospels. Woods described him as "not conventionally religious, although he had genuine religious feeling in broad terms". Mangcu noted that Biko was critical of organised religion and denominationalism and that he was "at best an unconventional Christian".

The Nationalist government portrayed Biko as a hater of whites, but he had several close white friends, and both Woods and Wilson insisted that he was not a racist. Woods related that Biko "simply wasn't a hater of people", and that he did not even hate prominent National Party politicians like B. J. Vorster and Andries Treurnicht, instead hating their ideas. It was rare and uncharacteristic of him to display any rage, and was rare for him to tell people about his doubts and inner misgivings, reserving those for a small number of confidants.

Biko never addressed questions of gender and sexism in his politics. The sexism was evident in many ways, according to Mamphela Ramphele, a BCM activist and doctor at the Zanempilo Clinic, including that women tended to be given responsibility for the cleaning and catering at functions. "There was no way you could think of Steve making a cup of tea or whatever for himself", another activist said. Feminism was viewed as irrelevant "bra-burning". Surrounded by women who cared about him, Biko developed a reputation as a womaniser, something that Woods described as "well earned". He displayed no racial prejudice, sleeping with both black and white women. At NUSAS, he and his friends competed to see who could have sex with the most female delegates. Responding to this behaviour, the NUSAS general secretary Sheila Lapinsky accused Biko of sexism, to which he responded: "Don't worry about my sexism. What about your white racist friends in NUSAS?" Sobukwe also admonished Biko for his womanising, believing that it set a bad example to other activists.

Biko married Ntsiki Mashalaba in December 1970. They had two children together: Nkosinathi, born in 1971, and Samora, born in 1975. Biko's wife chose the name Nkosinathi ("The Lord is with us"), and Biko named their second child after the Mozambican revolutionary leader Samora Machel. Angered by her husband's serial adultery, Mashalaba ultimately moved out of their home, and by the time of his death, she had begun divorce proceedings. Biko had also begun an extra-marital relationship with Mamphela Ramphele. In 1974, they had a daughter, Lerato, who died after two months. A son, Hlumelo, was born to Ramphele in 1978, after Biko's death. Biko was also in a relationship with Lorrain Tabane; they had a child named Motlatsi in 1977.

== Legacy ==
=== Influence ===
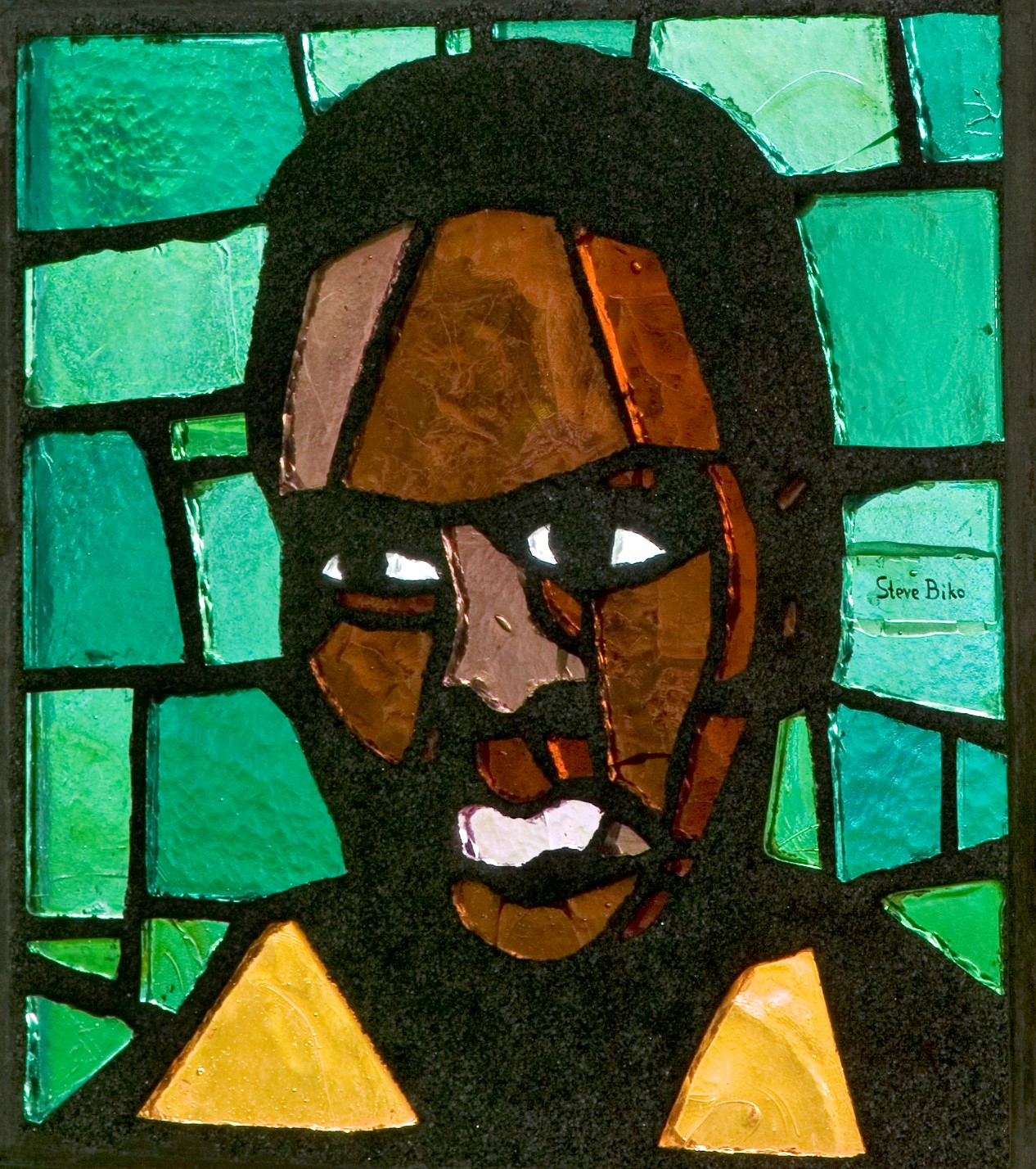
Steve Biko on a stained glass window in the Saint Anna Church in Heerlen, the Netherlands

Biko is viewed as the "father" of the Black Consciousness Movement and the anti-apartheid movement's first icon. Nelson Mandela called him "the spark that lit a veld fire across South Africa", adding that the Nationalist government "had to kill him to prolong the life of apartheid". Opening an anthology of his work in 2008, Manning Marable and Peniel Joseph wrote that his death had "created a vivid symbol of black resistance" to apartheid that "continues to inspire new black activists" over a decade after the transition to majority rule. Johann de Wet, a professor of communication studies, described him as "one of South Africa's most gifted political strategists and communicators". In 2004 he was elected 13th in SABC 3's Great South Africans public poll.

Although Biko's ideas have not received the same attention as Frantz Fanon's, in 2001 Ahluwalia and Zegeye wrote that the men shared "a highly similar pedigree in their interests in the philosophical psychology of consciousness, their desire for a decolonising of the mind, the liberation of Africa and in the politics of nationalism and socialism for the 'wretched of the earth'". Some academics argue that Biko's thought remains relevant; for example, in African Identities in 2015, Isaac Kamola wrote that Biko's critique of white liberalism was relevant to situations like the United Nations' Millennium Development Goals and Invisible Children, Inc.'s KONY 2012 campaign.

Though internationally Steve Biko became a symbol of apartheid abuse in the years following his death, for the [Black Consciousness]-minded (wherever they live) he has always been remembered for the life he led and the ethos he inspired among millions. And for his family and friends, he was much more: a husband, a father, a son, a brother, a confidant, a self-described freedom fighter.

— Shannen L. Hill

Woods held the view that Biko had filled the vacuum within the country's African nationalist movement that arose in the late 1960s following the imprisonment of Nelson Mandela and the banning of Sobukwe. Following Biko's death, the Black Consciousness Movement declined in influence as the ANC emerged as a resurgent force in anti-apartheid politics. This brought about a shift in focus from the BCM's community organising to wider mass mobilisation, including attempts to follow Tambo's call to make South Africa "ungovernable", which involved increasing violence and clashes between rival anti-apartheid groups.

Followers of Biko's ideas re-organised as the Azanian People's Organisation (AZAPO), which subsequently split into the Socialist Party of Azania and the Black People's Convention. Several figures associated with the ANC denigrated Biko during the 1980s. For instance, members of the ANC-affiliated United Democratic Front assembled outside Biko's Ginsberg home shouting U-Steve Biko, I-CIA!, an allegation that Biko was a spy for the United States' Central Intelligence Agency (CIA). These demonstrations resulted in clashes with Biko supporters from AZAPO.

A year after Biko's death, his "Frank Talk" writings were published as an edited collection, I Write What I Like. The defence that Biko provided for arrested SASO activists was used as the basis for the 1978 book The Testimony of Steve Biko, edited by Millard Arnold. Woods fled to England that year, where he campaigned against apartheid and further publicised Biko's life and death, writing many newspaper articles about him, as well as a book, Biko (1978). This was made into the 1987 film Cry Freedom by Richard Attenborough, starring Denzel Washington as Biko. Many film critics and Black Consciousness proponents were concerned that the film foregrounded white characters like Woods over Biko himself, but Cry Freedom brought Biko's life and activism to a wider audience. The state censors initially permitted its release in South Africa, but after it began screening in the country's cinemas, copies were confiscated by police on the order of Police Commissioner General Hendrik de Wit, who claimed that it would inflame tensions and endanger public safety. The South African government banned many books about Biko, including those of Arnold and Woods.

In 2025, the National Prosecuting Authority announced it would re-open the inquest into Biko's death.

=== Commemoration ===
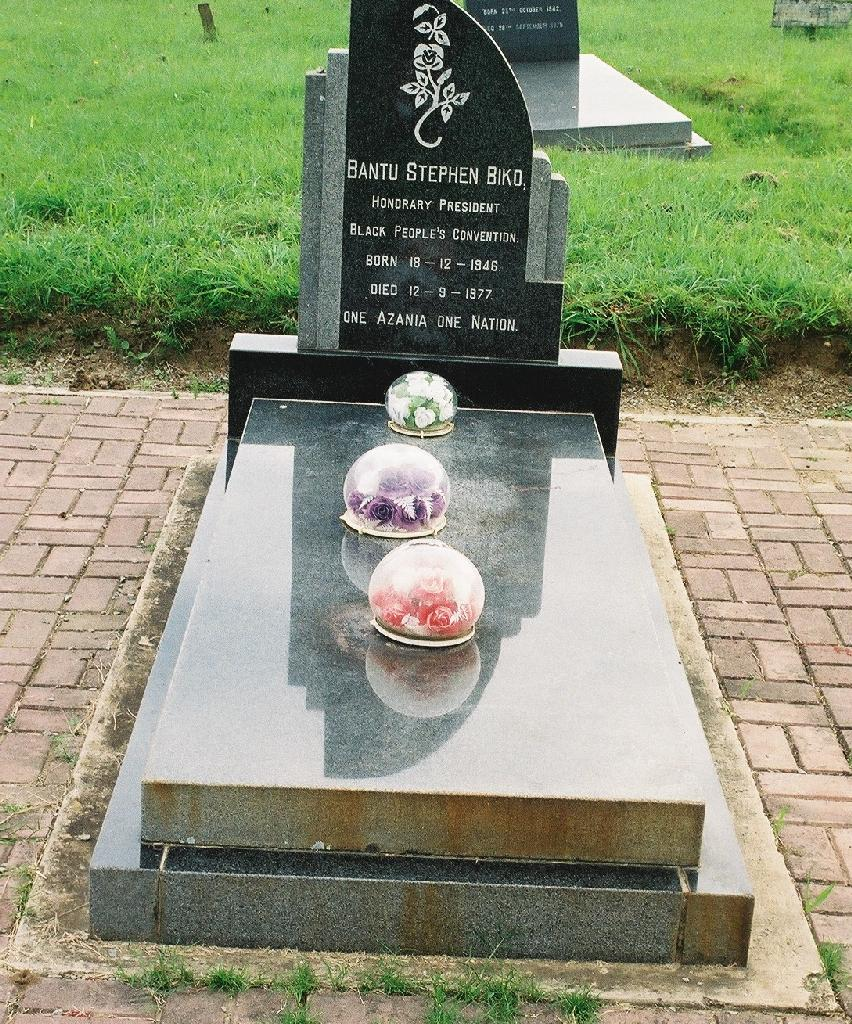
Biko's grave in Ginsberg cemetery, King William's Town

Biko was commemorated in several artworks after his death. Gerard Sekoto, a South African artist based in France, produced Homage to Steve Biko in 1978, and another South African artist, Paul Stopforth, included a work entitled The Interrogators in his 1979 exhibition. A triptych, it depicted the three police officers implicated in Biko's death. Kenya released a commemorative postage stamp featuring Biko's face.

Biko's death also inspired several songs, including from artists outside South Africa such as Tom Paxton and Peter Hammill. The English singer-songwriter Peter Gabriel released "Biko" in tribute to him, which was a hit single in 1980, and was banned in South Africa soon after. Along with other anti-apartheid music, the song helped to integrate anti-apartheid themes into Western popular culture. Biko's life was also commemorated through theatre. The inquest into his death was dramatised as a play, The Biko Inquest, first performed in London in 1978; a 1984 performance was directed by Albert Finney and broadcast on television. Anti-apartheid activists used Biko's name and memory in their protests; in 1979, a mountaineer climbed the spire of Grace Cathedral in San Francisco to unfurl a banner with the names of Biko and imprisoned Black Panther Party leader Geronimo Pratt on it.

Following apartheid's collapse, Woods raised funds to commission a bronze statue of Biko from Naomi Jacobson. It was erected outside the front door of city hall in East London on the Eastern cape, opposite a statue commemorating British soldiers killed in the Second Boer War. Over 10,000 people attended the monument's unveiling in September 1997. In the following months it was vandalised several times; in one instance it was daubed with the letters "AWB", an acronym of the Afrikaner Weerstandsbeweging, a far-right Afrikaner paramilitary group. In 1997, the cemetery where Biko was buried was renamed the Steve Biko Garden of Remembrance. The District Six Museum also held an exhibition of artwork marking the 20th anniversary of his death by examining his legacy.

Also in September 1997, Biko's family established the Steve Biko Foundation. The Ford Foundation donated money to the group to establish a Steve Biko Centre in Ginsberg, opened in 2012. The Foundation launched its annual Steve Biko Memorial Lecture in 2000, each given by a prominent black intellectual. The first speaker was Njabulo Ndebele; later speakers included Zakes Mda, Chinua Achebe, Ngũgĩ wa Thiong'o, and Mandela.

Buildings, institutes and public spaces around the world have been named after Biko, such as the Steve Bikoplein in Amsterdam. In 2008, the Pretoria Academic Hospital was renamed the Steve Biko Hospital. The University of the Witwatersrand has a Steve Biko Centre for Bioethics. In Salvador, Bahia, a Steve Biko Institute was established to promote educational attainment among poor Afro-Brazilians. In 2012, the Google Cultural Institute published an online archive containing documents and photographs owned by the Steve Biko Foundation. On 18 December 2016, Google marked what would have been Biko's 70th birthday with a Google Doodle.

Amid the dismantling of apartheid in the early 1990s, various political parties competed over Biko's legacy, with several saying they were the party that Biko would support if he were still alive. AZAPO in particular claimed exclusive ownership over Black Consciousness. In 1994, the ANC issued a campaign poster suggesting that Biko had been a member of their party, which was untrue. Following the end of apartheid when the ANC formed the government, they were accused of appropriating his legacy. In 2002, AZAPO issued a statement declaring that "Biko was not a neutral, apolitical and mythical icon" and that the ANC was "scandalously" using Biko's image to legitimise their "weak" government. Members of the ANC have also criticised AZAPO's attitude to Biko; in 1997, Mandela said that "Biko belongs to us all, not just AZAPO." On the anniversary of Biko's death in 2015, delegations from both the ANC and the Economic Freedom Fighters independently visited his grave. In March 2017, the South African President Jacob Zuma laid a wreath at Biko's grave to mark Human Rights Day.

== See also ==
- List of people subject to banning orders under apartheid
