= Mamphela Ramphele =

South African activist and politician (born 1947)

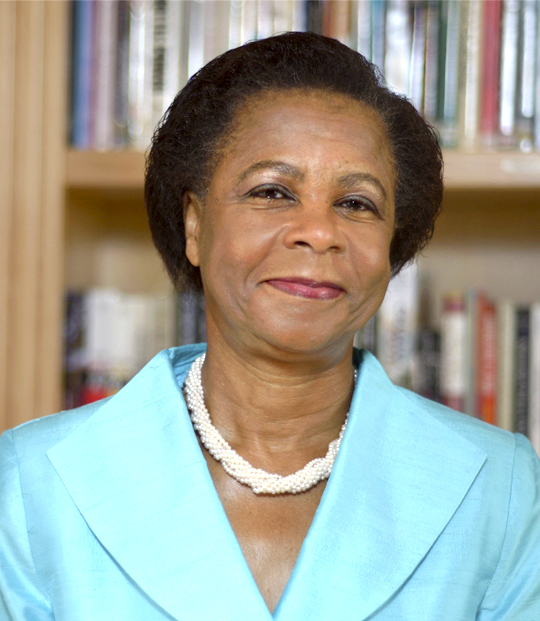

Co-President of the Club of Rome
- Incumbent
- Assumed office October 2018 Serving with Sandrine Dixson-Declève
- Preceded by: Anders Wijkman

President of Agang South Africa Founder of Agang South Africa
- In office 18 February 2013 – 8 July 2014
- Preceded by: Position established
- Succeeded by: Andries Tlouamma

Vice-Chancellor of the University of Cape Town
- In office 1996–2000
- Chancellor: Harry Oppenheimer
- Preceded by: Stuart J. Sanders
- Succeeded by: Njabulo Ndebele

Personal details
- Born: 28 December 1947 (age 78) Bochum District, Transvaal, South Africa
- Domestic partner: Steve Biko
- Children: Hlumelo Biko
- Occupation: medical doctor; activist; businesswoman; academic; educator; anthropologist
- Known for: Anti-apartheid activist Agang South Africa; Former Managing Director of the World Bank

Mamphela Aletta Ramphele (/ˈmʌmpiːlə ˈrʌmpiːli/; born 28 December 1947) is a South African politician, anti-apartheid activist, medical doctor and businesswoman. She was the partner of anti-apartheid activist Steve Biko, with whom she had two children. She is a former vice-chancellor at the University of Cape Town and a former managing director of human development at the World Bank. Ramphele founded the political party Agang South Africa in February 2013 but withdrew from politics in July 2014. Since 2018, she has been the co-president of the Club of Rome.

== Early life ==
Ramphele, a Mopedi, was born in the Bochum District in Northern Transvaal (now Limpopo). She completed her schooling at Setotolwane High School in 1966 and subsequently enrolled for pre-medical courses at the University of the North. Her mother, Rangoato Rahab, and her father, Pitsi Eliphaz Ramphele were primary school teachers. In 1944, her father was promoted as headmaster of Stephanus Hofmeyer School. Ramphele contracted severe whooping cough at the age of three months. The wife of the local church minister, Dominee Lukas van der Merwe, gave her mother medical advice and bought medicines for the sick child that saved her life.

In 1955, Ramphele witnessed a conflict between a racist Afrikaner church minister and the people of the village of Kranspoort. This contributed to her political awakening.

== Education ==
Ramphele attended the G. H. Frantz Secondary School but in January 1962 she left for Bethesda Normal School, a boarding school which was part of the Bethesda teachers training college. In 1964, she moved to Setotolwane High School for her matriculation where she was one of only two girls in her class. On completion of her schooling in 1966, in 1967, Ramphele enrolled for pre-medical courses at the University of the North. In 1968, she was accepted into the University of Natal Medical School, then the only institution that allowed black students to enrol without prior permission from the government. Her meagre financial resources meant that she was forced to borrow money to travel to the Natal Medical School (now the Nelson Rolihlahla Mandela Medical School). Ramphele won the 1968 South African Jewish Women’s Association Scholarship and the Sir Ernest Oppenheimer Bursary worth about R150 annually for the rest of her years at Medical School.

Ramphele received her Bachelor of Medicine, Bachelor of Surgery (MBChB) from the University of Natal, a BComm in Administration from the University of South Africa as well as diplomas in tropical health & hygiene and Public Health from the University of the Witwatersrand. In 1991 she received her PhD in Social Anthropology from the University of Cape Town. Ramphele has also authored and edited a number of books.

== Activism ==
While at university, Ramphele became increasingly involved in student politics and anti-apartheid activism, becoming one of the founders of the Black Consciousness Movement (BCM), where she met Steve Biko, with whom she had a relationship. As a member of the BCM, she was crucially involved in organising and working with community development programmes. Biko and Ramphele had two children during their affair; Lerato Biko, born in 1974, and Hlumelo Biko, born in 1978. Lerato contracted fatal pneumonia when she was two months old. Their son Hlumelo Biko was born after Biko's death. Ramphele and her son would eventually work together in the Circle Group holding company for their family investments.

Ramphele worked with the South African Students' Organisation (SASO), a breakaway from the National Union of South African Students (NUSAS) that operated on English-speaking white campuses. NUSAS had black and white students as members. SASO was formed in 1969 under the leadership of Steve Biko.

From 1970 onwards Ramphele became increasingly drawn into political activism with Biko, Barney Pityana and other student activists at the Medical School. She was elected the chairperson of the local SASO branch. Ramphele received her qualification in medicine in 1972. She began her medical internship at Durban’s King Edward VIII Hospital, later transferring to Livingstone Hospital in Port Elizabeth.

In 1974, Ramphele was charged under the Suppression of Communism Act for being in possession of banned literature. In 1975, she founded the Zanempilo Community Health Care Centre in Zinyoka, a village outside King William’s Town. It was one of the first primary healthcare initiatives outside the public sector in South Africa. During this time she was also the manager of the Eastern Cape branch of the Black Community Health Programme. She travelled extensively in the Eastern Cape, organising people to be drawn into community projects. In addition to her medical duties, Ramphele also became the director of the Black Community Programmes (BCP) in the Eastern Cape when Biko was banned. In August 1976, Ramphele was detained under Section 10 of the Terrorism Act, one of the first persons to be detained under this newly promulgated law.

In April 1977, Ramphele was issued with banning orders and banished to Tzaneen, Northern Transvaal, where she remained until 1984. A member of the local church arranged for her to live with two African nuns in a local village, Tickeyline. She later established a home for herself in Lenyenye township near Tzaneen, although she remained under police surveillance. During her stay in Tzaneen, Ramphele established the Isutheng Community Health Program, with monetary aid from the BCP. This foundation was used to empower local women and aid them in growing vegetable gardens, amongst other initiatives.

During her stay in Tzaneen, Ramphele enjoyed occasional illicit outings to escape everyday life, as well as visits from Helen Suzman, MP of the Progressive Party. Suzman assisted Ramphele in securing a passport when Ramphele travelled abroad. Ramphele also enjoyed visits from Father Timothy Stanton; an Anglican priest who visited her and celebrated Eucharist with her.

In 1983, she completed her BComm degree through UNISA (the University of South Africa), which she had registered for in 1975. She also completed a Postgraduate Diploma in Tropical Hygiene and a Diploma in Public Health at the University of Witwatersrand. This required that Ramphele apply for a special dispensation to travel to Johannesburg where she had to report at the John Vorster Square Police Station upon her arrival and departure.

Ramphele left Lenyenye in 1984 to go to Port Elizabeth where she was offered a job at Livingstone Hospital. However, she left to take up an appointment at the University of Cape Town (UCT) that Francis Wilson, a Professor of Economics, had arranged. She was to work with him at the South African Labour and Development Research Unit (SALDRU) as a research fellow.

== Career ==
Ramphele joined the University of Cape Town as a research fellow in 1986 and was appointed as one of its deputy vice-chancellors in 1991. She was appointed to the post of vice-chancellor of the university in September 1996, thereby becoming the first black woman to hold such a position at a South African university. Part of her executive role was to take charge of the university’s Equal Opportunity Policy Portfolio, with the aim of changing the culture of the institution. In 1994, Ramphele was a visiting scholar at Harvard University's Kennedy School of Government in Cambridge, Massachusetts, US.

In 2000, Ramphele became one of the four managing directors of the World Bank. She was tasked with overseeing the strategic positioning and operations of the World Bank Institute as well as the vice-presidency of external affairs. She was the first South African to hold this position.

Ramphele serves as a trustee of the Nelson Mandela Foundation, served as the director of The Institute for Democratic Alternatives in South Africa (IDASA) and as a board member of the Anglo-American Corporation, non-executive director of Medi Clinic Holdings and Transnet.

Ramphele also served as a trustee for the Link-SA trust, a charitable organisation that raises money to subsidise the tertiary education of South Africa's brightest underprivileged students. She was on the board of the Mo Ibrahim Foundation, an organisation that supports good governance and great leadership in Africa.

She was voted 55th in the Top 100 Great South Africans in 2004.

She is co-founder of ReimagineSA and in 2018 was voted co-president of The Club of Rome

== Politics ==
In 2013, Ramphele expressed interest in South African politics and resigned as the chairperson of Gold Fields. On 18 February 2013, she announced the formation of a new political party, named Agang South Africa (Agang is Northern Sotho for "Build"), intended to challenge the African National Congress.

Some critics have challenged Ramphele's drawing on Steve Biko's legacy in her political campaigns.

On 28 January 2014, Ramphele accepted an invitation from the Democratic Alliance to stand as their presidential candidate in the 2014 general election. On 31 January 2014, Ramphele issued a statement saying that she would not take up Democratic Alliance party membership and would remain the leader of Agang South Africa, resulting in confusion. On 2 February 2014, Helen Zille stated that Ramphele had reneged on her agreement to stand as the Democratic Alliance's presidential candidate. Ramphele subsequently apologised for the reversal of her decision, saying that the timing was not right as the reaction to it had shown people were unable to overcome race-based party politics.

Agang South Africa won two seats in the National Assembly of South Africa. Following internal conflict within the party, Ramphele announced her withdrawal from politics on 8 July 2014.

== Honorary degrees and awards ==
Ramphele has received twenty-four honorary degrees and numerous awards, including:

- Honorary doctorate University of Glasgow https://www.gla.ac.uk/news/headline_973362_en.html 2023
- Honorary doctorate at the International Institute of Social Studies, The Hague, The Netherlands, in 1997.
- Honorary Doctor of Law from the University of Cambridge in 2001.
- Honorary doctorate in humane letters from Hunter College of the City University of New York in 1984.
- Honorary Doctor of Science degree from Tufts University in May 1991.
- Honorary doctorate in medicine from the University of Natal.
- Medal of Distinction from Barnard College in the United States.
- Ramphele is also a former fellow of the Bunting Institute and was elected as an honorary member of the Alpha and Iota chapters of Phi Beta Kappa at Radcliffe and Harvard Colleges.
- Honorary doctorate of humane letters degree from New York University in May 2007.
- Admitted to the Order of Simon of Cyrene in 2010.
- Officer of the Legion of Honour, the highest decoration in France.
- Lifetime Achiever Award from the National Research Foundation in 2007.

== Publications ==
- Dreams, Betrayal and Hope. Penguin Random House. 2017. ISBN 9781776090921.
- A Passion for Freedom: My Life. I.B.Tauris. 2014. ISBN 978-1-78453-042-6.
- Uprooting poverty: the South African challenge: report for the Second Carnegie Inquiry into Poverty and Development in Southern Africa. David Philip. 1989. ISBN 978-0-86486-072-9. with Francis Wilson. This book draws together research conducted by the second Carnegie inquiry into poverty and development in South Africa and received the 1990 Noma Award, an annual prize given to African writers and scholars whose work is published in Africa.
- Bounds of possibility: the legacy of Steve Biko & Black consciousness. D. Philip. 1991. ISBN 978-0-86486-210-5. co-editor with Barney Pityana, Francis Wilson, et al
- Restoring the Land: Environment and Change in Post-apartheid South Africa. Panos Publications, Limited. 1991. ISBN 978-1-870670-27-2. co-editor with Chris McDowell, this publication deals with the ecological challenges facing post-apartheid South Africa.
- A Bed Called Home: Life in the Migrant Labour Hostels of Cape Town. New Africa Books. 1993. ISBN 978-0-86486-227-3. This book was based on Ramphele's PhD thesis in social anthropology, The Politics of Space, and deals with life in the migrant labour hostels of Cape Town.
- Conversations with My sons and daughters. Penguin Books Limited. 2012. ISBN 978-0-14-352982-8.
- Across Boundaries: The Journey of a South African Woman Leader. Feminist Press at CUNY. 1999. ISBN 978-1-55861-166-5. with Johnnetta B. Cole
- Steering by the Stars: Being Young in South Africa. Tafelberg. 2002. ISBN 978-0-624-04096-5.
- Laying Ghosts to Rest: Dilemmas of the Transformation in South Africa. Nb Pub Limited. 2008. ISBN 978-0-624-04579-3.

== See also ==
- List of people subject to banning orders under apartheid

== Notes and references ==
- Campbell, Carol (2004). Great South Africans: the great debate. Johannesburg: Penguin Books. ISBN 978-0-14-302461-3.
- Leib, Bonnie. "Mamphela Ramphele, a Biography" (PDF).
- "Dr. Mamphela Ramphele, Managing Director, The World Bank Group" (PDF). 2003.
- Andrew Ainslie; et al. (2006). The Road to Democracy in South Africa. Vol. 2, 1970–1980. Pretoria: South Africa Democracy Education Trust. p. 136.

Academic offices
| Preceded by Stuart Saunders | Vice-Chancellor of the University of Cape Town; 1996 – 2000 | Succeeded by Njabulo Ndebele |
