= Gideon Nieuwoudt =

South African police officer

- Born: 1951; South Africa
- Died: August 19, 2005 (aged 54); Port Elizabeth, South Africa
- Police career
- Country: South Africa
- Department: Security Branch

Gideon Nieuwoudt (1951–2005) was a former apartheid-era security policeman involved in the torture and murder of several anti-apartheid activists, including Steve Biko. Nieuwoudt, nicknamed "Notorious", was one of the most feared security policemen in the Eastern Cape for his interrogation methods including wet bags, poison, torture machines and often disguised himself as a priest, dubbing him the "Priest from hell". Nieuwoudt had up to five hearings at the Truth and Reconciliation Commission (TRC), in connection with the murders of numerous political activists.

== Role in the murder of Steve Biko ==
Nieuwoudt was implicated in the murder of the anti-apartheid activist Steve Biko, who was a leader in the Black Consciousness Movement (BCM). Nieuwoudt admitted to hitting Biko with a rubber hose, while he was being interrogated in a police office in Port Elizabeth. Nieuwoudt was denied amnesty by the TRC in 1999 for his role in the murder of Steve Biko.

== Role in the murder of Siphiwo Mtimkulu and Topsy Madaka ==
In 2000, Nieuwoudt was granted amnesty by the TRC for his role in the abduction, torture and murder of student anti-apartheid activists Siphiwo Mthimkhulu and Topsy Madaka who were members of the Congress of South African Students (COSAS), otherwise known as the "Cosas Two". A decision that was later overturned. Nieuwoudt was involved in burning the bodies of the murdered activists at Post Chalmers and claimed that he disposed of the bodies in the Fish River. Nieuwoudt underwent a religious conversion as a result of which he asked the Mtimkulu family for forgiveness, for his involvement in Siphiwo's murder. In 1998, a documentary was shown on television in which Niewoudt, accompanied by a camera crew, approached the Mtimkulu's house and asked for forgiveness. Through this footage, Nieuwoudt quickly became a recognizable face to television viewers. The Mtimkulu family did not believe that Nieuwoudt had disclosed the truth about how Mtimkulu and Madaka were killed. The family was proved correct by the investigations of the Missing Persons Task Team (The MPTT), an investigative unit set up by the National Prosecuting Authority to locate and identify activists who were murdered during apartheid. The MPTT discovered that the Security Police has disposed of the remains of Mtimkulu and Madaka in a septic tank at Post Chalmers and had not thrown their remains into the Fish River. The Security Police lied at the Truth Commission Hearings.

== Role in the murder of the Pebco Three ==
Nieuwoudt confessed to having been involved in the abduction, beating and murder of the anti-apartheid activists Qaqawuli Godolozi, Champion Galela and Sipho Hashe in 1985, who belonged to the Port Elizabeth Civic Organisation (PEBCO), otherwise known as the Pebco Three. In 1999, Nieuwoudt along with Herman Barend Du Plessis, Johannes Martin Van Zyl and Gerhardus Johannes Lotz were denied amnesty for their role in the murder of The Pebco Three.

== Role in the murder of the Motherwell Four ==
In 1989, Nieuwoudt along with Marthinus Ras and Wybrand du Toit were implicated in the killing of three black police officers Mbalala "Glen" Mgoduka, Amos Temba Faku, Desmond Daliwonga Mpipa and police informer Xolile Shepard Sakati in Motherwell. Nieuwoudt, Ras, and du Toit planted a bomb in a car which blew up while the four police officers were driving. Nieuwoudt stated that the four police officers were killed because they had secretly joined the ANC. In 1996, Niewoudt was sentenced to 20 years' imprisonment for the car bomb murder of what became known as the Motherwell Four.

== Death ==
Nieuwoudt died of lung cancer in 2005. He'd been awaiting the outcome for his amnesty application for the murder of the Motherwell Four at the time of his death.
