= Paul Stopforth =

South African artist

- Born: Paul; 1945 (age 80–81)
- Citizenship: South Africa
- Education: Royal College of Art
- Occupation: Artist
- Employer: Harvard University

Paul Stopforth is a white South African artist that now lives in the United States. His politically charged work was suppressed in his native country by the apartheid government and he left for the United States in 1988. He recently retired from his position as lecturer on visual and environmental studies and director of undergraduate studies at Harvard University, where he began teaching in 1996. He is currently full-time visiting faculty at the School of the Museum of Fine Arts, Boston.

Stopforth studied at the Johannesburg College of Art and the Royal College of Art in London. He frequently works with mixed media on paper. He was permanently collected by the South African National Gallery in 1979.

In 1981 and 1983 Stopforth made two large drawings titled "Elegy" and "Interrogation Space #1-5" about Steve Biko, South African Black Consciousness Movement leader who died in 1977 from head while in police custody. Following Biko's death images of his autopsy images of his body were widely circulated, further dehumanizing and transforming Biko into a vessel of bare life (in Agamben's use of the term, a body that represents a base level of life outside of civilization, one who has been stripped of all social worth and can be killed without repercussions). Especially Stopforth's drawings "Elegy" re-humanizes and transforms Biko into a martyr for the anti-apartheid movement.
