= Old Synagogue, Pretoria =

Former Orthodox synagogue in Pretoria, South Africa

Old Synagogue
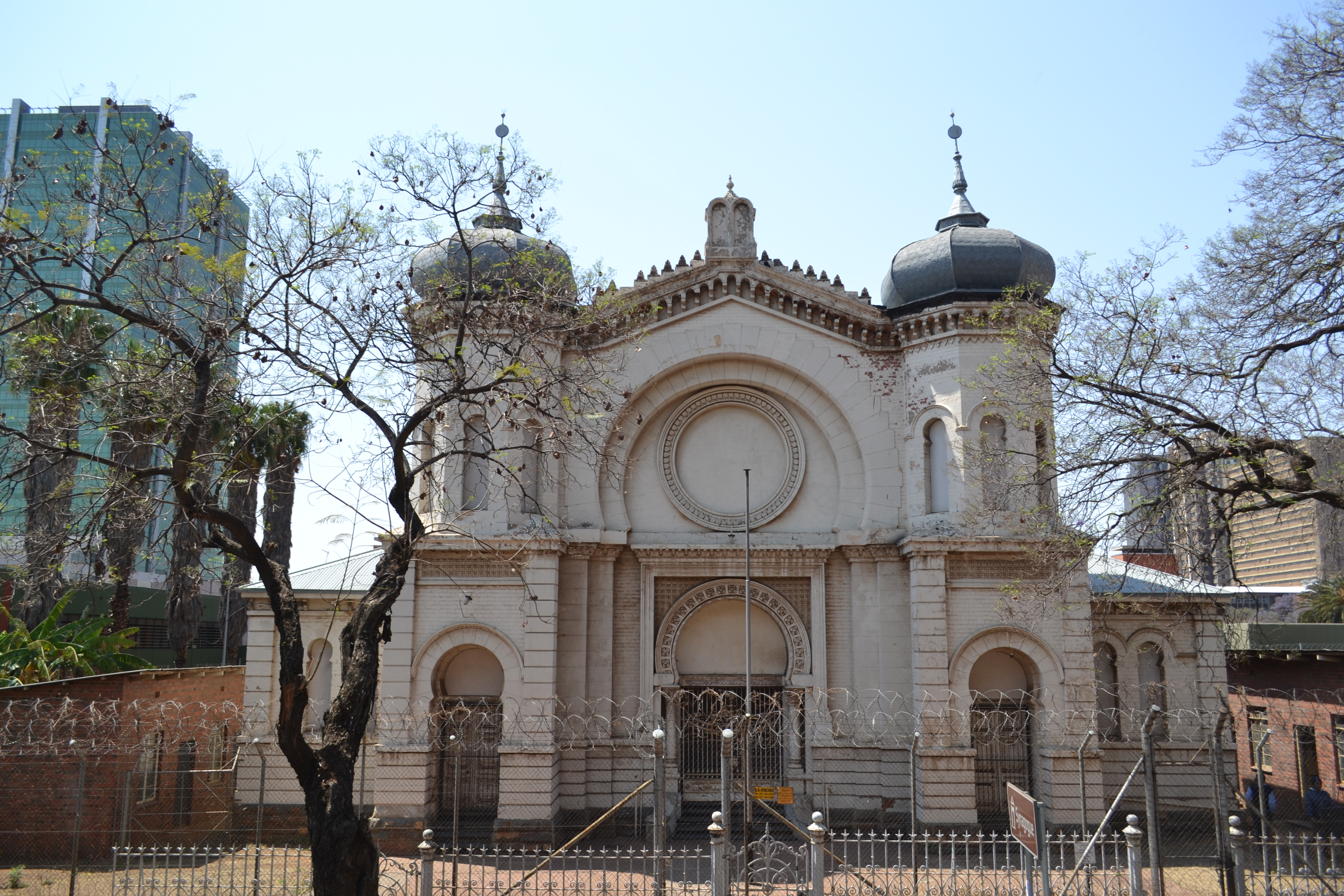

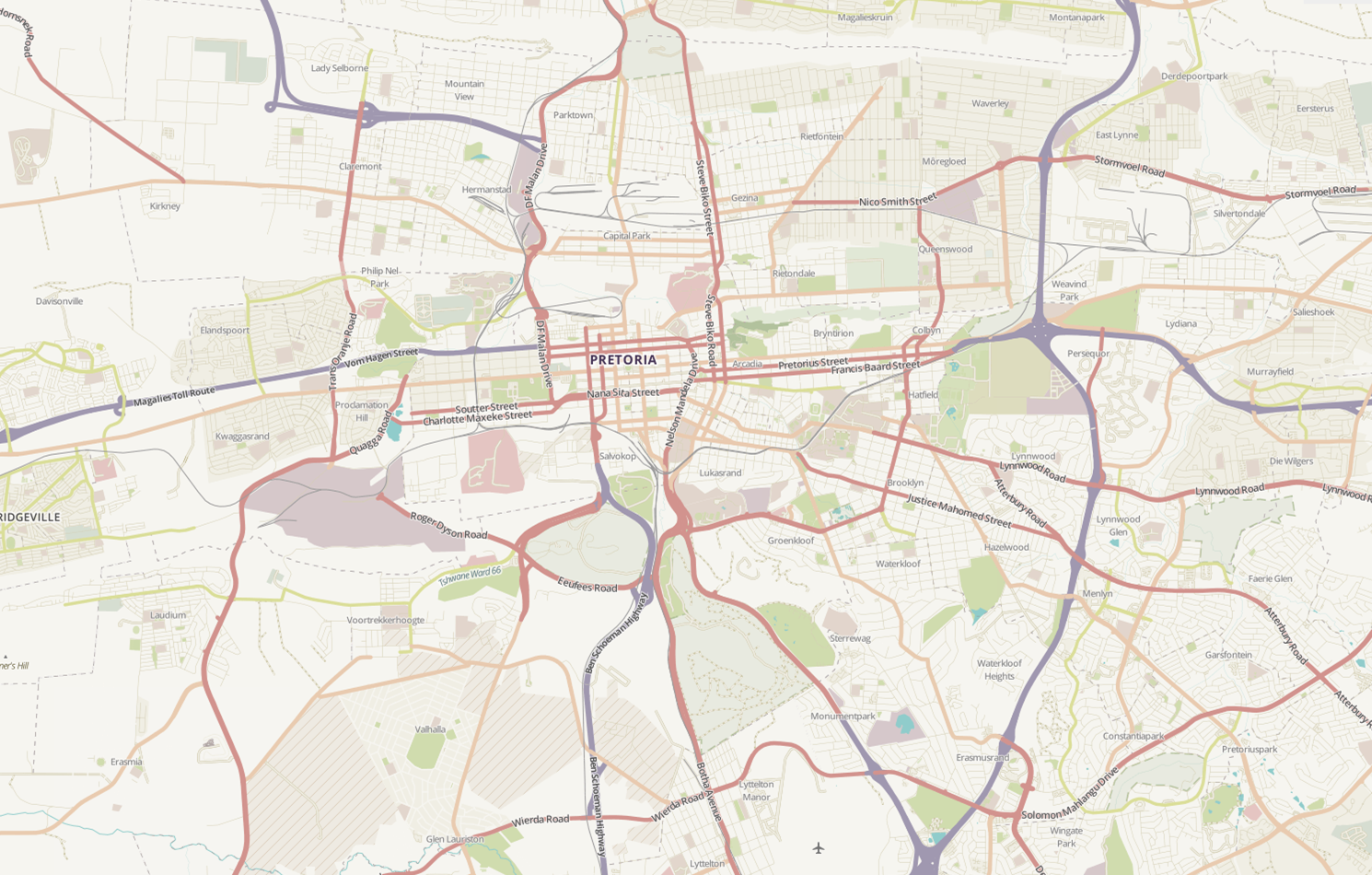
- The location of the synagogue in Pretoria

Religion
- Affiliation: Orthodox Judaism (former)
- Rite: Nusach Ashkenaz
- Ecclesiastical or organizational status: Synagogue (1898–1952); Court house (1956–1977); Profane use (since 1977)
- Ownership: The Pretoria Hebrew Congregation (1896–1952); Department of Public Works and Infrastructure (since 1952)
- Year consecrated: 1898
- Status: Closed (as a synagogue); Repurposed

Location
- Location: Paul Kruger Street, Pretoria, Gauteng
- Country: South Africa
- Interactive map of Old Synagogue
- Coordinates: 25°44′33″S 28°11′17″E

Architecture
- Architects: Beardwood and Ibler
- Type: Synagogue architecture
- Style: Byzantine Revival
- Groundbreaking: 1897
- Completed: 1898
- Dome: Two (maybe more)

The Old Synagogue, also known as The Pretoria Hebrew Congregation, is a former Orthodox Jewish congregation, synagogue, and apartheid-era court house on Paul Kruger Street in Pretoria, South Africa. It was consecrated in 1898 and closed as a synagogue in 1952, when the congregation moved to a larger site. The former synagogue building was subsequently expropriated and sold to the State for use as a Special Annex of the Supreme Court of South Africa between 1956 and 1977. In this period, Nelson Mandela was a defendant at the court in both the 1956 and the Rivonia treason trials. In 1977, it was the setting for an inquest into the death of Steve Biko. It is now a Grade II Provincial Heritage Resource and protected under the National Heritage Resources Act (25 of 1999). The building and site remains under the control of the Department of Public Works and Infrastructure.

== History ==
=== 1897–1952 synagogue and architecture ===
State President Paul Kruger gave the land to the local Jewish community to build a synagogue. It was the first permanent synagogue established in Pretoria, with the foundation stone laid in 1897, followed by consecration in 1898. President Kruger was invited to the consecration:

"Our President was held in great respect by the Jews of the Transvaal. You will remember the story of how he was invited to open the synagogue in Pretoria. He made a little speech and then he declared the synagogue open ‘in the name of our Lord Jesus Christ, Amen’. But they didn’t hold it against him."

— Alan Paton, Ah, but Your Land Is Beautiful, 1983

The building was designed by Beardwood and Ibler Architects, a Johannesburg architecture practice. It originally had a polychromatic façade in an oriental style. It was based on the basilican plan that was common among European synagogues, with elements of the western façade ranging from the central Gothic style stained glass rose window to alternating horizontal bands of red and white brickwork, including the arched windows' surroundings, evocative of a Moorish Revival style. The flanking onion-shaped domes give the building its Byzantine Revival style. The architects drew on influences from Dohány Street Synagogue in Budapest and the Central Synagogue in Manhattan. The building also conformed with a stylistic vernacular of the time, "Victorian eclecticism and ZAR (Zuid-Afrikaans Republiek) style."

The construction was beset by a lack of financial resources and in 1906, Sammy Marks rescued the congregation by settling its mortgage on the building. As the congregation increased in size, it was apparent that a larger site would be needed. In 1952, the congregation relocated to a new, larger synagogue, the Great Synagogue on Pretorius Street. The candelabra, cornerstone and stained glass window of the main façade of the original synagogue were transferred to the new site.

=== 1952–1977 apartheid-era courtroom ===
After the relocation, the original site was expropriated and transferred to the ownership of the State; and the community received £35,000 for the synagogue building and the site. The state had plans to redevelop the site as a new Supreme Court complex and intended to "adapt the Synagogue into a special Supreme Court" which would cater to "cases related to the security situation, the activities of the black opposition movements and socialist-communist alliances". In objection to plans for a court segregated on racial lines, a senior judge convinced Prime Minister Hendrik Verwoerd to abandon the plans. The building instead functioned as a special annex of the Supreme Court for security-related cases.

The elaborate brick façade was painted with "a coating of Public Works cream", typical of government buildings. Additional utility buildings were constructed for police accommodation, holding cells and witness waiting rooms. The interior of the synagogue was reconfigured for a law court, converting the altar into judicial benches, removing some of the stained glass windows and bricking up other windows. A display of the Ten Commandments was also boarded up.

In 1958, the Chief Rabbi Louis Isaac Rabinowitz, wrote to the Department of Justice, objecting to the new court being referred to as "the Old Synagogue", and also by the state broadcaster, the South African Broadcasting Corporation. Rabinowitz was dismayed at any association being made between the Treason Trial and a synagogue. He also requested that the Star of David symbol be removed from the building.

The 1956 Treason Trial was transferred to the site on 1 August 1958 and lasted until 29 March 1961. Nelson Mandela and Walter Sisulu were among the defendants and all were acquitted. Mandela returned for a second trial on 5 August 1962, in which he was received a five-year prison sentence with hard labour. While in custody, Mandela, Sisulu, Denis Goldberg, Govan Mbeki, and Andrew Mlangeni, returned to the Old Synagogue for the hearings of the Rivonia Trial. They were sentenced to life in prison on Robben Island. This sentence was passed from the Palace of Justice and not the former synagogue. Mandela's first televised interview was also filmed in the synagogue and broadcast on 31 January 1961, by a Dutch television broadcaster, AVRO. Mandela later recalled that "the synagogue was like a second home to me after four years of the Treason Trial."

In 1971, Gonville ffrench-Beytagh, the Anglican Dean of Johannesburg, was tried and convicted in the building on treason and terrorism charges that were later appealed. The final legal proceedings took place between 14 November to 2 December 1977, with an inquest into the death of Steve Biko. Sydney Kentridge represented ffrench-Beytagh and the Biko family in both proceedings.

=== 1977–present (storage and vacant state) ===
The building was then used as storage for the National Museum of Cultural History. It has been vacant since 1994 and fallen into a dilapidated state. Madeleine Hicklin, shadow deputy minister of the Department of Public Works and Infrastructure, and niece of former defendant, Denis Goldberg, have called for restoration of the building.

== In popular culture ==
- Mongane Wally Serote's novel, To Every Birth Its Blood begins with a trial in the old Pretoria Synagogue.

== Gallery ==
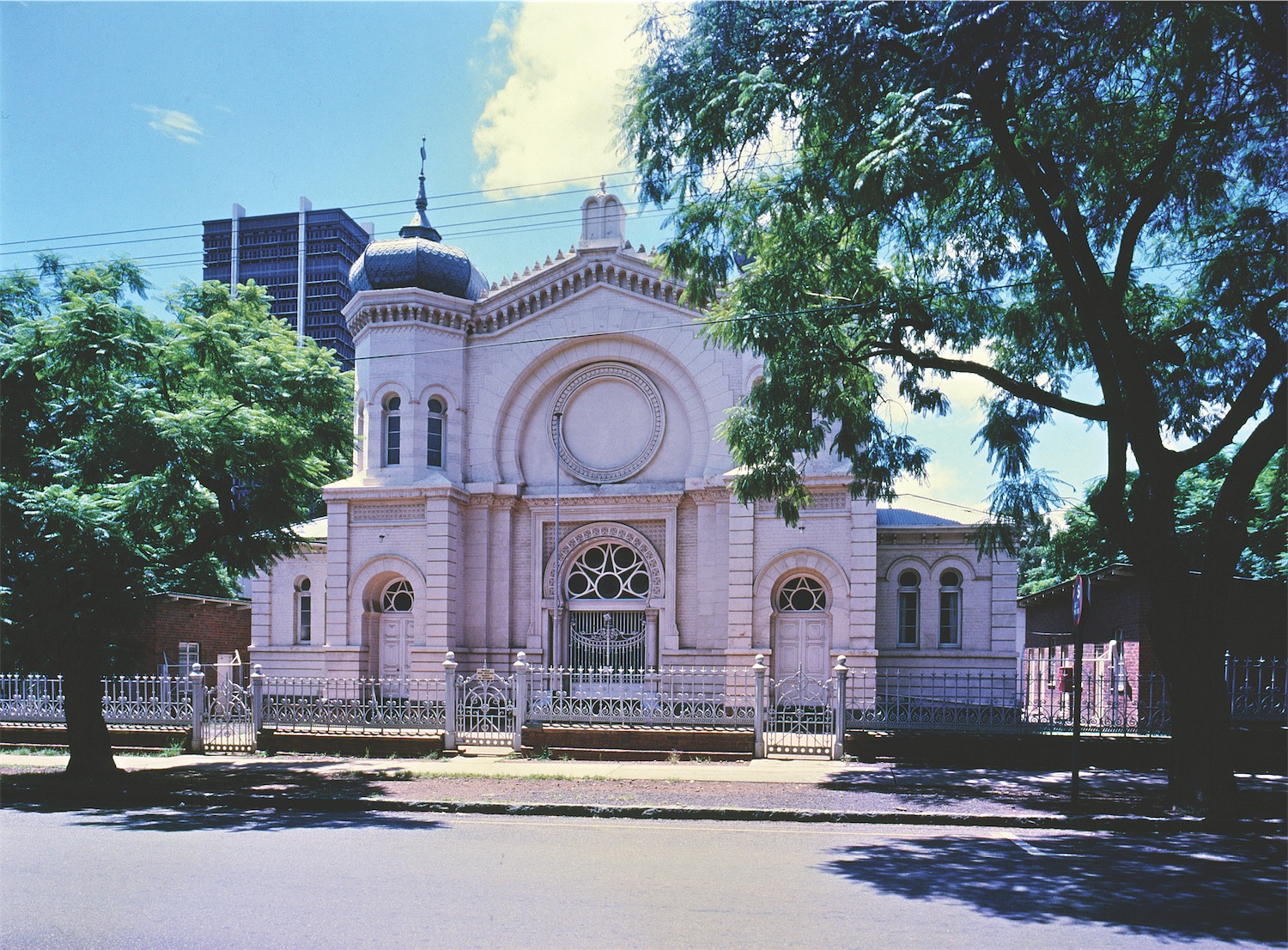
The Old Synagogue in 1988

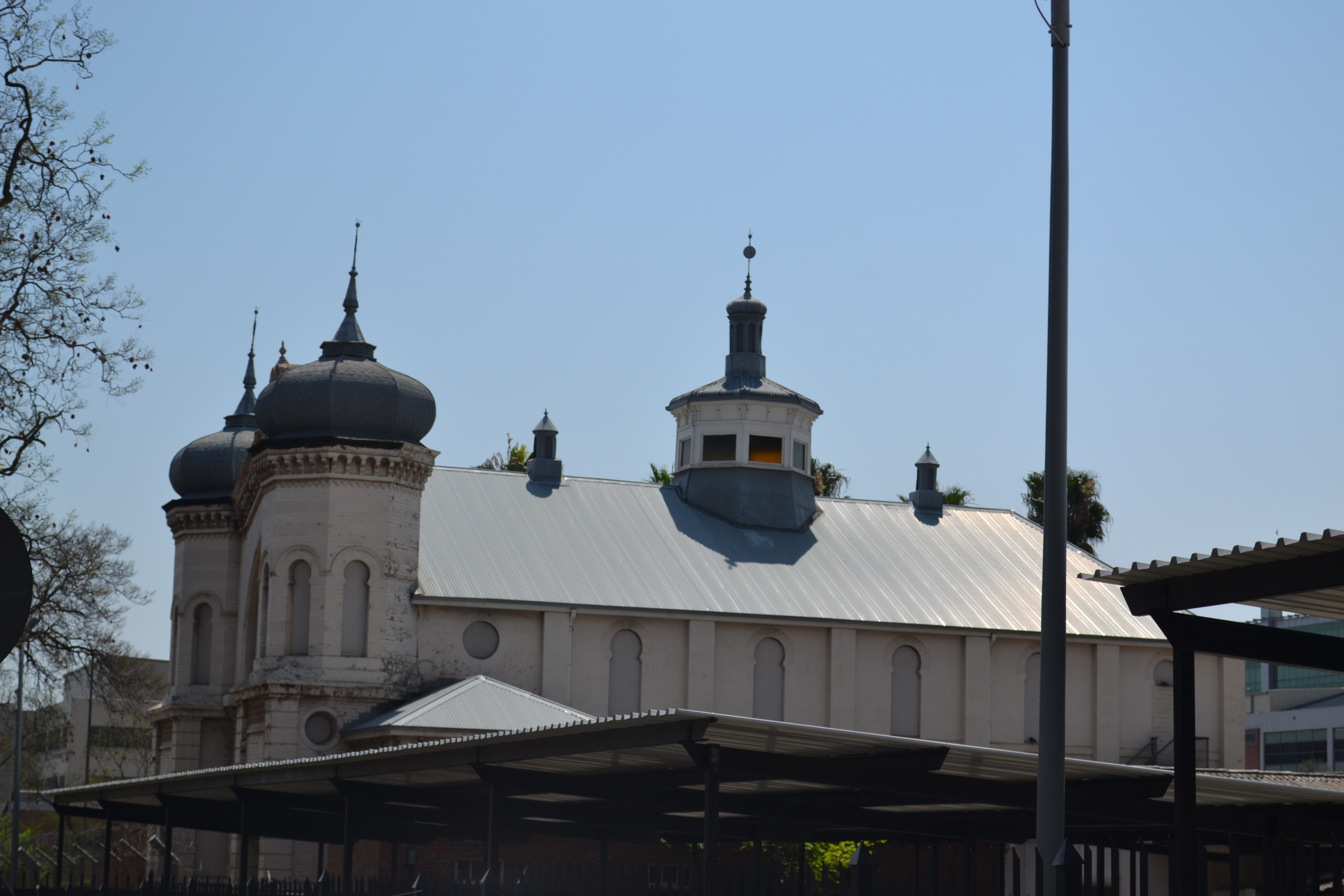
Roof of the Old Synagogue in 2013

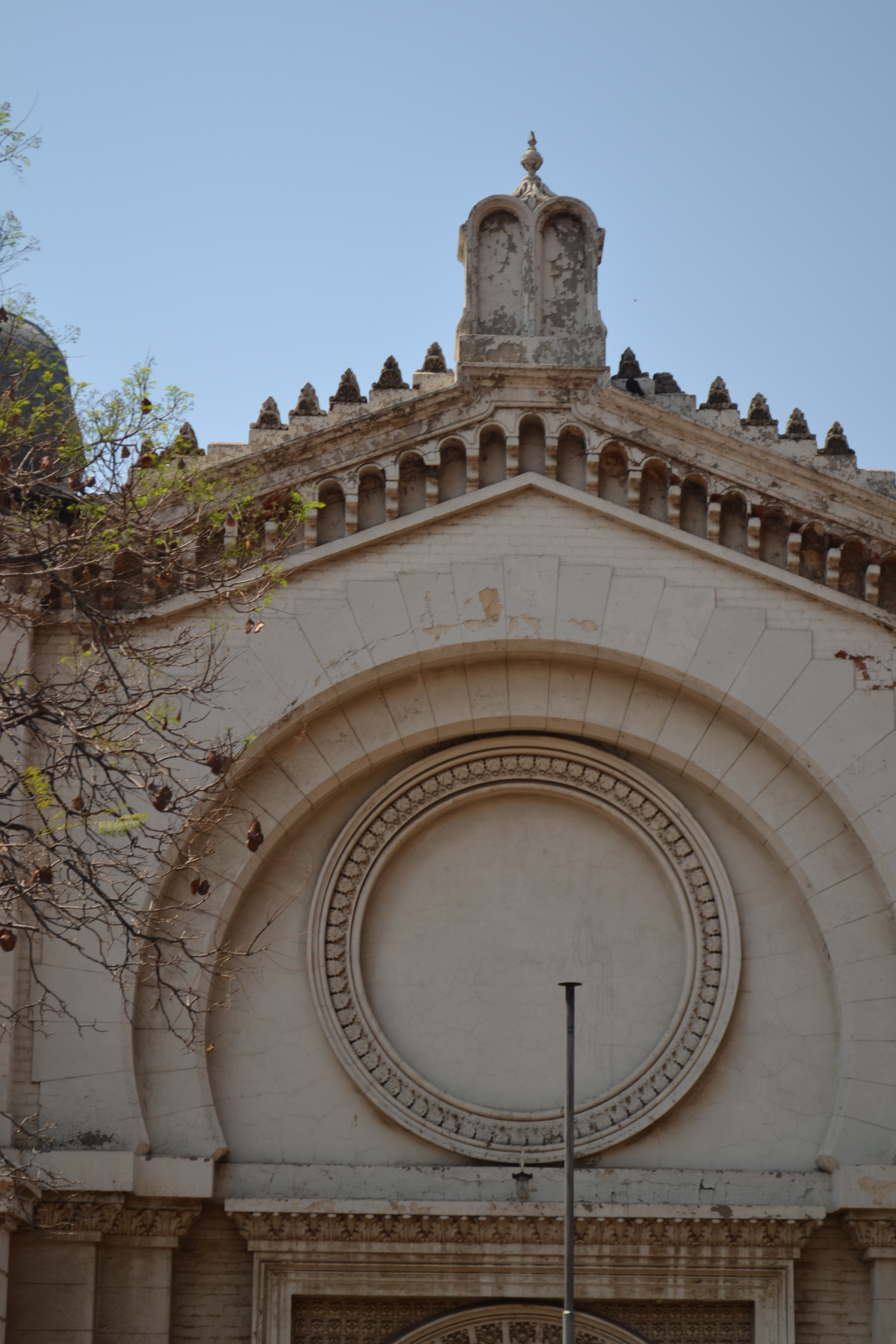
Exterior detail above the entrance in 2013

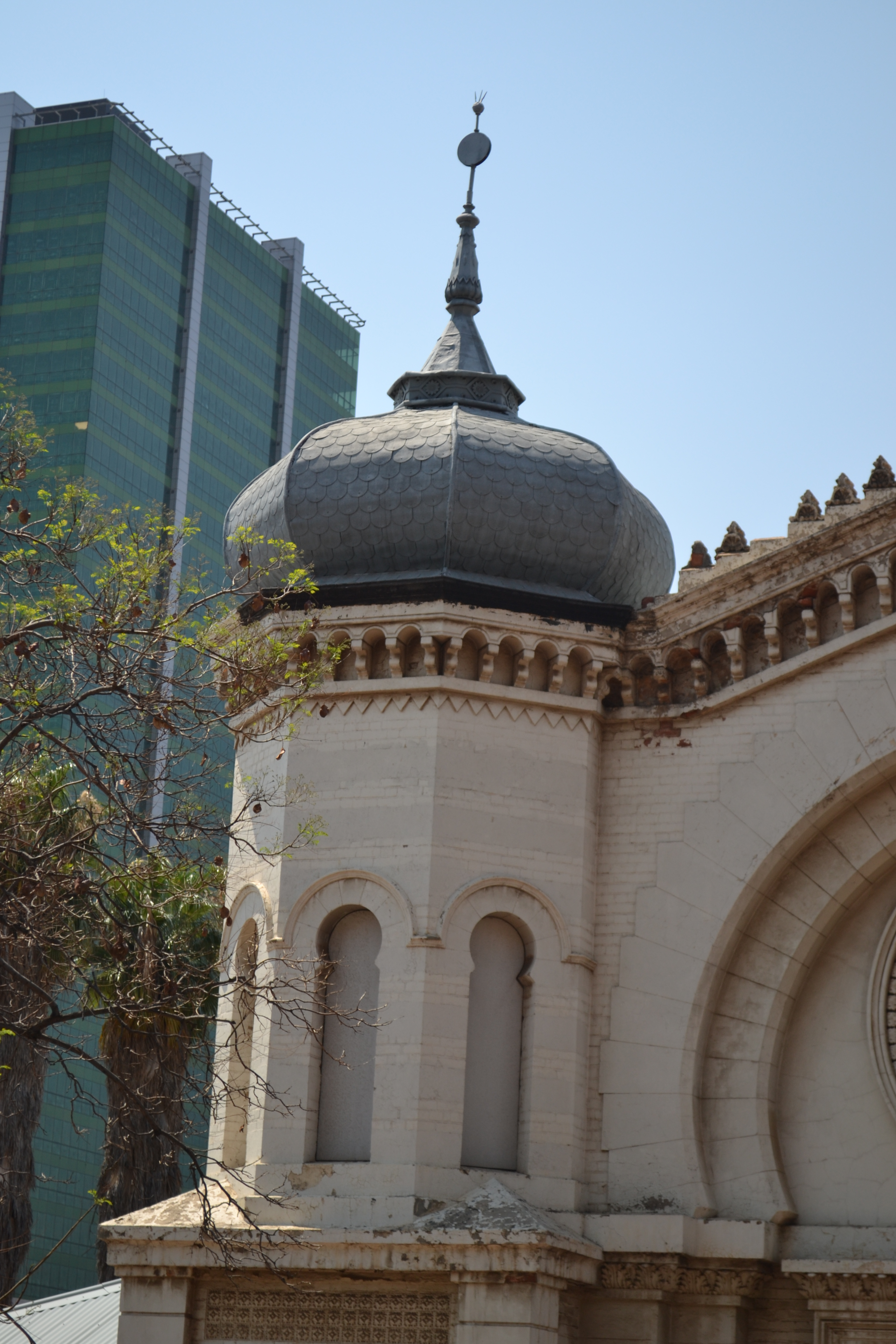
Exterior detail in 2013

== See also ==
- History of the Jews in South Africa
- List of synagogues in South Africa
