= Agang South Africa =

Political party in South Africa

- English name: Build South Africa
- President: Andries Tlouamma
- Founded: 18 February 2013
- Headquarters: PO Box 31817, Braamfontein, 2017
- Ideology: Anti-corruption politics Progressivism; Liberalism
- Political position: Centre to centre-left
- Colours: Green
- Slogan: Restoring the Promise of Freedom
- National Assembly seats: 0 / 400

Website
- agangsa.org.za

Agang South Africa (Agang SA) is a South African political party, first announced by anti-apartheid activist Mamphela Ramphele on 18 February 2013, and founded on 22 June 2013, the date of the party's first official congress.

Agang is a Setswana word meaning "let us build". The party encourages reforms towards direct governance, striving to "build a stronger democracy in which citizens will be at the centre of public life"; and challenged the governing African National Congress in the 2014 general election. The party ran again in the 2019 general election, losing all of its seats, and did not contest the 2024 general election.

== History ==
On 28 January 2014, the Democratic Alliance (DA) announced that Ramphele had accepted an invitation to stand as its presidential candidate in the 2014 general election, and the DA and Agang were set to merge. On 31 January 2014, Ramphele stated that she would not take up DA party membership and would remain the leader of Agang, resulting in confusion. On 2 February 2014, Helen Zille stated that Ramphele had reneged on her agreement to stand as the DA's presidential candidate. Ramphele subsequently apologised for the reversal of her decision, saying that the timing was not right as the reaction to it had shown people were unable to overcome race-based party politics. On 9 February 2014, following statements by Helen Zille that donor funding issues were behind the failed merger, Ramphele named business magnate Nathan Kirsh as a funder of Agang and said he would continue to fund the new party.

In the 2014 election, the party received 52,350 votes, or 0.28% of the total, and won two seats in the National Assembly of South Africa. Following internal conflict within the party, Ramphele announced her withdrawal from politics on 8 July 2014.

Mike Tshishonga, one of the party's two MPs, was appointed acting president, but was expelled from the party in 2015 after being accused of misappropriating R80 000 of party funds, and then not attending the disciplinary hearing. He was replaced as president by the party's other MP, Andries Tlouamma.

John McConnachie, party national spokesperson at the time of the 2014 election, claimed that Tlouamma and Tshishonga orchestrated a revolt against Ramphele in the aftermath of the party's poor results, resulting in her resignation, and that Tlouamma later engineered the expulsion of Tshishonga, replacing him in parliament with Koekoe Mahumapelo, an unknown member of his clique not listed on the Agang national list at the time of the elections.

In the 2016 municipal elections, support for the party dropped to 0.01% nationally, and the party lost all of its seats in the 2019 general election.

In May 2024, Agang SA endorsed Good for the 29 May national and provincial elections and encouraged its members and supporters to cast their votes for Patricia de Lille’s party on the national, regional and provincial ballots.

== Ideology ==
The following aims are listed on the party's website as of 2019:

- Replace the current economic system with one that works for all South Africans.
- Focus on improvement of education by various means, including:
  - training teachers,
  - increasing teacher salaries,
  - improving and building libraries,
  - filling teacher vacancies, and
  - social grants to families with well-performing students.
- Improve healthcare by various means, including:
  - expanding training facilities,
  - giving more control to local government, and
  - increasing private sector operational ability in the industry.
- Improve public service by:
  - banning conflict of interest deals,
  - protecting whistleblowers,
  - training government officials in anticorruption best practices, and
  - introducing a culture of transparency in government.
- Improve safety and security by:
  - boosting the police force budget,
  - investing in policing research,
  - de-militarising the police,
  - redesigning police training, and
  - introduction of open big data analytics in the policing and security sector.

Agang SA's logo from time of founding until adoption of current logo

== Election results ==
=== National Assembly ===
Election	Total votes	Share of vote	Seats	+/–	Government
2014	52,350	0.28%	2 / 400	–	in opposition
2019	13,856	0.08%	0 / 400	▼2	extraparliamentary

=== Provincial elections ===
Election	Eastern Cape		Free State		Gauteng		Kwazulu-Natal		Limpopo		Mpumalanga		North-West		Northern Cape		Western Cape	
Election	%	Seats	%	Seats	%	Seats	%	Seats	%	Seats	%	Seats	%	Seats	%	Seats	%	Seats
2014	0.11%	0/63	0.20%	0/30	0.42%	0/73	–	–	0.36%	0/49	0.13%	0/30	0.44%	0/33	–	–	0.30%	0/42
2019	–	–	0.15%	0/30	0.07%	0/73	–	–	0.16%	0/49	0.15%	0/30	0.21%	0/33	–	–	–	–

=== Municipal elections ===
Election	Votes	%
2016	5,493	0.01%
2021	1,569	0.01%
