= Xhosa language newspapers =

History of the newspapers of Xhosa speakers in South Africa

This article focuses on the history of 19th century Xhosa language newspapers in South Africa.

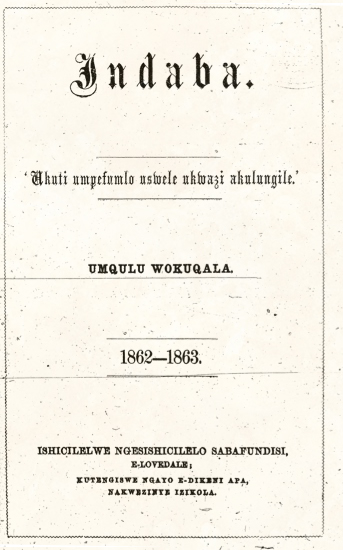
The cover page of the first issue of Indaba from 1862

== Introduction ==
The first Nguni language newspapers in South Africa were founded in the Eastern Cape during the 19th century. The efforts of the Glasgow Missionary Society and the Wesleyan Methodist Missionary Society were largely responsible for the beginnings of Xhosa language publishing. Christian missionaries were responsible for the beginning of the movement towards vernacular language publishing in South Africa: the first piece of Xhosa writing was a hymn written in the early 19th century by the prophet Ntsikana. The Bible was translated into Xhosa between the 1820s and 1859.

== List of 19th and 20th century Xhosa newspapers ==
19th and 20th century Xhosa newspapers
Start date	Name	Translation	Period	Publication
1. 1837	Umshumayeli Wendaba	Preacher of the news	July 1837 to April 1841	15 issues
2. 1845	Ikwezi	Morning Star	August 1844 to December 1845	4 issues
3. 1850	Isitunywa Senyanga	The Monthly Messenger	August to December 1850	5 issues
4. 1862	Indaba	The News	August 1862 to February 1865	Example
5. 1870	Isigidimi samaXhosa	The Xhosa Messenger	October 1870 to December 1888	Example
6. 1897	Izwi labantu	The Voice of the People	November 1897 to April 1909	Example
7. 1884	Imvo Zabantsundu	African Opinion	November 1884 to August 1901	Example
8. 1938	"Inkundla YaBantu"	(lit. the Court of the People) Territorial Magazine	April 1938 – early 1950s	Example
9. 2015	I'solezwe lesiXhosa	Eye of the nation in Xhosa	30 March 2015 –	

== Newspapers ==
=== Umshumayeli Wendaba ===
The earliest known black newspaper in Southern Africa was founded by the Wesleyan Methodist Missionary Society in Grahamstown, Eastern Cape. The first 10 issues (1837–39) were published in Grahamstown and the last five issues (1840–41) at Peddie. The first and fifth issues of the publication were 10 pages, and the other 13 issues were eight pages.

=== Ikwezi ===
Founded by the Glasgow Missionary Society and published in association with the Wesleyan Methodist Missionary Society at Chumie mission station (Chumie Press) near Lovedale in the Eastern Cape. "The items included a story of Ntsikana (the Xhosa prophet), an article on circumcision among the Xhosa, a story of George Washington ...accounts of Christian work in lands beyond Africa, stories of African converts to Christianity and an appeal to Christian parents about the training of their children" (Ngcongco). According to Mahlasela, this magazine contained the earliest known writings in Xhosa by a Xhosa writer. William Kobe Ntsikana (son of the prophet), Zaze Soga, and Makhaphela Noyi Balfour were among those who wrote for the journal.

=== Isitunywa Senyanga ===
A newspaper for the "literary and religious advancement of the Xhosa" (September 1850), it was edited by J. W. Appleyard of the Wesleyan Methodist Missionary Society. The newspaper was published at Mount Coke (Wesleyan Mission Press), near King William's Town, Cape. It averaged four pages with editorials and news stories in English.

=== Indaba ===
Founded and published by the Glasgow Missionary Society for African teachers and students at Lovedale, near Alice, Cape. The newspaper was written mostly by Africans from Lovedale, among whom was Tiyo Soga, who wrote under the pseudonym "Nonjiba Waseluhlangeni" (Dove of the Nation). One-third of the newspaper was in English for the "intellectual advancement" of the students.

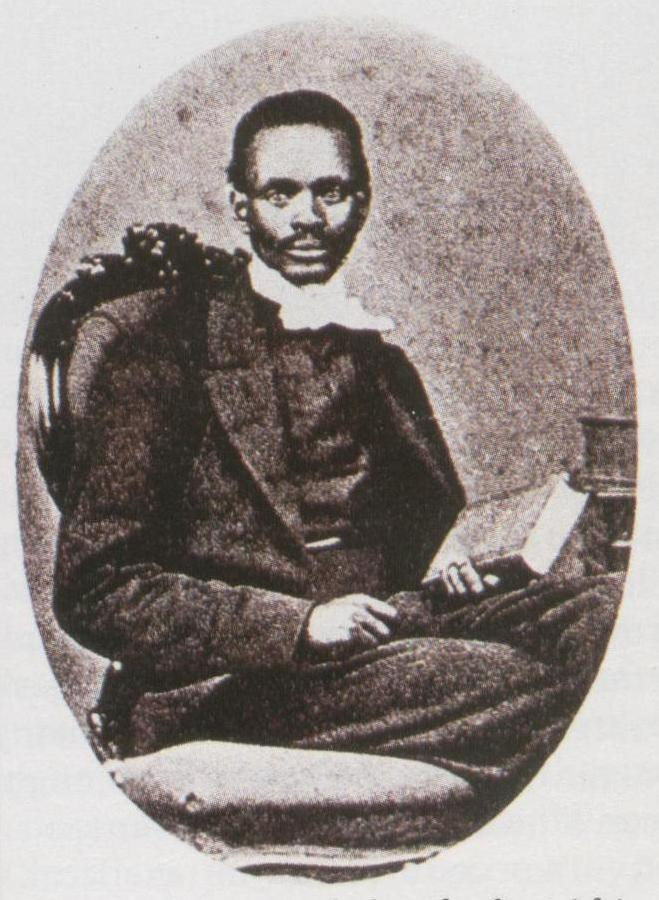
Tiyo Soga – Xhosa nationalist politician of the Cape Colony

=== Isigidimi samaXhosa ===
October 1870 – December 1875 (as part of The Kaffir Express); January 1876 – December 1888 (as an independent newspaper) monthly, fortnightly (1883–84). After the demise of the first newspapers, European missionaries founded Isigidimi Sama-Xosa (The Xhosa Messenger), which appeared between October 1870 and December 1888. James Stewart, principal of Lovedale and publisher of Lovedale Mission Press, was the founding editor and he later handed the editorial position over to Tiyo Soga's students (Makiwane, Bokwe, Jabavu and Gqoba). [With the death of William Wellington Gqoba in 1888, Isigdimi Sama –Xosa newspaper collapses.] ---> Discontent with the intervention of the missionaries concerning the content of Isigidimi samaXhosa, John Tengo Jabavu founded Imvo Zabantsundu newspaper.

=== Izwi labantu ===
Founded and published in East London by Inggungqutela, a group of Africans opposed to John Tengo Jabavu's support of the Afrikaner Bond in the election of 1898 in the Cape Colony—the one area in Southern Africa before 1910 where a significant number of Africans (and Coloureds) actually had voting rights. Nathaniel Cyril Umhalla (or Mhala), Paul Xiniwe, R. R. Mantsayi, Thomas Mqanda, George W. Tyamzashe, W. D. Soga, A. H. Maci and F. Jonas, with financial backing from Cecil John Rhodes, launched the news- paper which supported the English-speaking Progressive Party. Umhalla, assisted by Tyamzashe, was the first editor followed by Allan Kirkland Soga, a son of Tiyo Soga, the pioneer missionary, hymnist and writer. Samuel E. K. Mqhayi was the sub- editor (1897–1900, 1906–09) and a writer for the newspaper under the pseudonym of "Imbongi Yakwo Gompo" (The Gompo Poet). Izwi Labantu's most important political writer was undoubtedly Walter Rubusana, a founder-member of the South African Native National Congress (SANNC) in 1912 (it was renamed the African National Congress in 1919) and the political foe of Jabavu. As Trapido put it, Izwi Labantu broke Imvo Zabantsundu's "monopoly of news and propaganda" and thus enhanced the Black Press's role as "a forum for those who wanted to co-ordinate African political activity." Izwi Labantu actively supported the Native Press Association and was used effectively in the founding of the South African Native Congress (1902), a Cape regional forerunner of the SANNC.

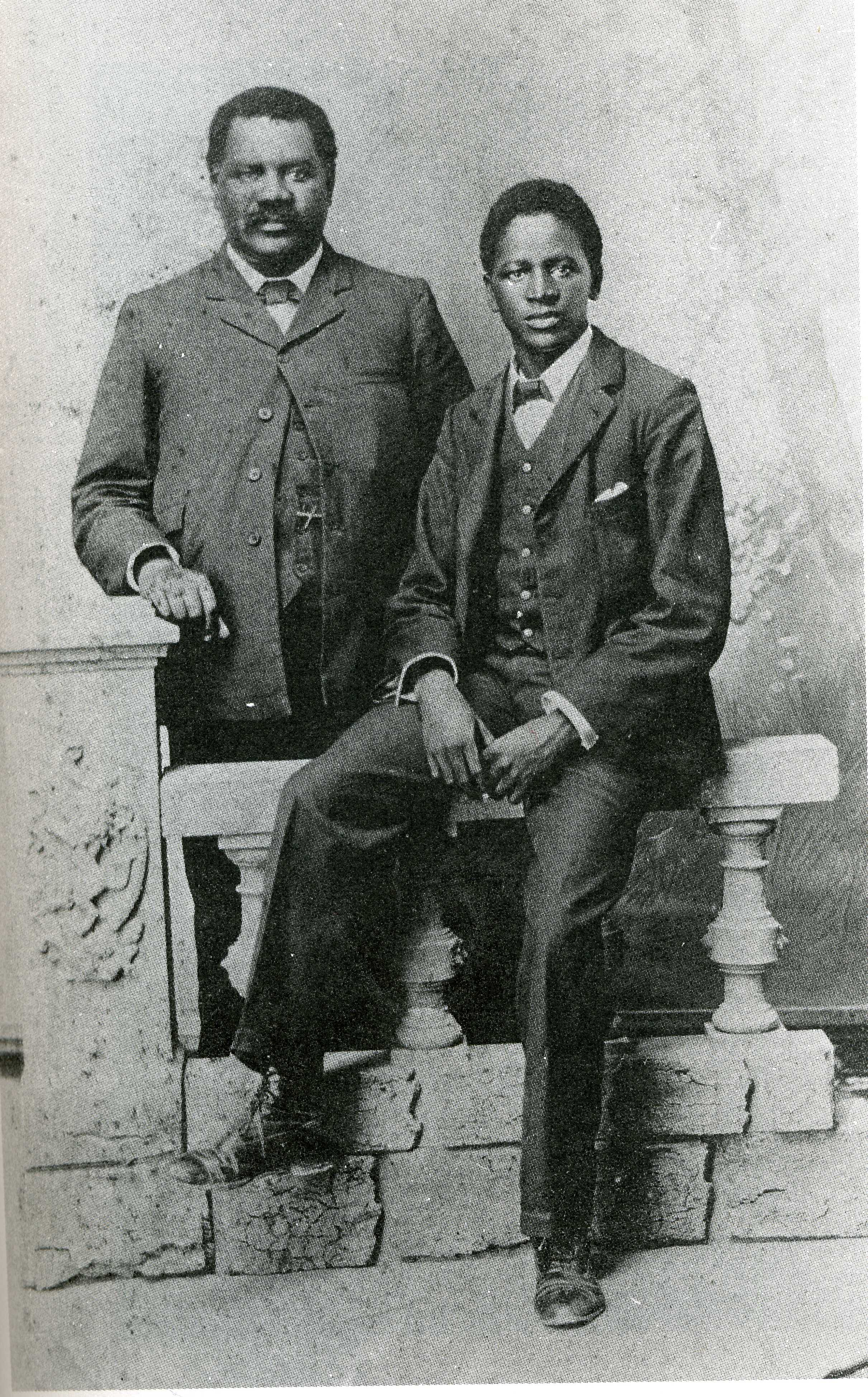
John Tengo Jabavu and his son Davidson Don Tengo, around 1903

=== Imvo Zabantsundu ===
Founded in King William's Town in the Eastern Cape by John Tengo Jabavu with white financial support—chiefly from Richard W. Rose-Innes, King William's Town lawyer and the brother of James Rose-Innes, and James W. Weir, a local merchant and son of a Lovedale missionary. Like John Dube, Jabavu —an influential figure in "white" and "black" politics for more than 40 years—accepted the principle of non-violence and the necessity of working together with "liberal" whites in trying to reform a white-dominated, multi-racial society. The Jabavu family controlled the newspaper until 1935—although from time to time it was edited by others, including John Knox Bokwe (a partner in the company 1898–1900), Solomon Plaatje (July–November 1911), and Samuel E. K. Mqhayi (1920–21). Jabavu's sons, Davidson Don Tengo Jabavu and Alexander Macaulay Jabavu (1889–1946), inherited the newspaper when their father died in 1921. Alexander edited the journal until 1940, but it was sold eventually to Bantu Press. The newspaper was moved to Johannesburg until 1953 and then transferred to East London. In 1956 it was moved back to Johannesburg. B. Nyoka edited the newspaper for most of the period it was controlled by Bantu Press, although he was supervised, in turn, by a white editorial director. King William's Town Printing Company, owned by F. Ginsberg, operated the newspaper in partnership with Bantu Press in King William's Town in 1957 and then published the newspaper independently until 1963, when it was sold to Tanda Pers – then a subsidiary of Afrikaanse Pers – and, later, Perskor. Thus Imvo Zabantsundu – the oldest, continuous newspaper founded by an African in South Africa – now promoted the ideology of apartheid. Tiyo Soga's students later founded Imvo Zabantsundu (African Opinion, November 1884– )

=== Inkundla Ya Bantu ===
Inkundla Ya Bantu was first published in April 1938 under the name Territorial Magazine. It was subsequently renamed in June 1940. Its distribution area covered at first the rural parts of the Eastern Cape and Southern Parts of KwaZulu-Natal and then later expanded to the Johannesburg and Witwatersrand area. The newspaper was released monthly at first and then in 1943 became a fortnightly publication and for a while it published weekly but in the last two years of its existence it only managed to publish monthly and some months not at all. Inkundla Ya Bantu was the only independent, 100% black-owned newspaper at the time of its inception and for the duration of its lifespan, that played a significant role in African politics. It published articles in both English and Xhosa.

Intsimbi. An IsiXhosa published in and around Umtata in the 1940s
