= Jabavu =

Jabavu is a surname. Notable people with the name include:

- Davidson Don Tengo Jabavu (1885–1959), Bantu political activist and author
- John Tengo Jabavu (1859–1921), South African writer and political activist
- Noni Jabavu (1919–2008), South African writer and journalist
