= Walter Rubusana =

South African politician and newspaper founder

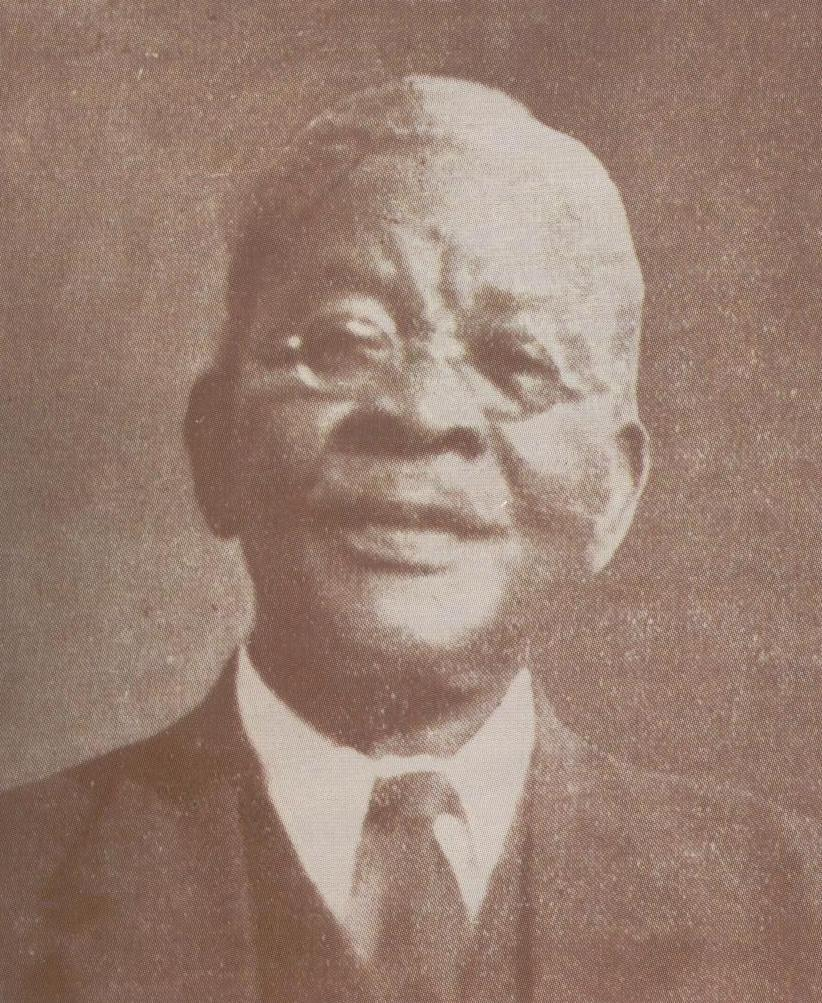
Walter Rubusana - Cape Politician - Provisional Council

Mpilo Walter Benson Rubusana (21 March 1858 – 19 April 1936) was the co-founder of the Xhosa language newspaper publication, Izwi Labantu, funded by Cecil John Rhodes, and the first Black person to be elected to the Cape Council (Parliament) in 1909. He also initiated the Native Education Association that contributed towards the formation of the South African Native National Congress (SANNC) in 1912 and later renamed the African National Congress in 1923.

== Early life ==
He was born on 21 March 1858 to Nomenti Rubusana in Mnandi, located in the district of Somerset East that formed part of the Cape Colony and given the name Mpilo. His father Mbonjana Rubusana, a farm labourer, was among a multitude of men who served as Sandile kaNgqika’s duty men in varied fields and subjects although he was illiterate. Further to this, he also served as a councillor to chief Bhotomane of the imiDange chiefdom and was a staunch custodian of African culture and languages.

When he was born, it was during a very bad period for the Xhosa people as they had recently suffered defeat in the 8th Frontier War and because of Nongqawuse's prophecies. He spent most of his childhood herding livestock and only began school as an adolescent, aged 16 years. He was noticed by Reverend Richard Birt, who had met him at the London Missionary School in Peelton, near King William’s Town. In 1874, Birt enrolled him at the Boys School at Peelton’s Native Training College. A year later, Rubusana was baptized and thus given a new Christian name: Walter Benson. His African name, Mpilo, was officially expunged and the traditional skin he normally wore was replaced with a white shirt as a marker of a shift from the traditional to the modern world. When Rubusana completed his early education, he then went on to enrol at Lovedale College, a missionary school established and maintained by the Free Church of Scotland, situated close to the iThyume river. Under the tutelage of Dr. James Stewart, he studied towards a certificate in education upon where, in 1878, he graduated, emerging as one of the top achievers. Upon the completion of his studies in education, Rubusana remained at Lovedale College, opting this time around to pursue theological studies again under the tutelage of James Stewart, with the assistance of the Revd Andrew Smith.

== Professional life ==
In 1880, he finally decided to leave Lovedale College to take up a post as a teacher at a missionary station/school in Peelton, where he also doubled as an assistant minister. He advocated for compulsory education but also went a step further to argue for mother-tongue instruction. It is at this point that he met and married Nomhaya Deena Nzanzana, who would become his first wife in 1883. They were both educators. During the course of the marriage, the Rubusanas had 12 children, even though only six of them survived until adulthood. They followed in their parents’ footsteps and became teachers themselves. In 1920, his wife Deena died and he married Bella Noni Kashe, from Alice, Eastern Cape. This marriage bore one child, a boy. He continued working in Peelton up until 1884 when he was ordained as the head of the Congregational Church. He moved to East London, where he would spend the rest of his life. In the early 1900s, he began an interest in politics and began aligning himself with organisations that were politically orientated. He agitated for black self-representation in the Cape Parliament and was subsequently elected as the first Black member of that Parliament in 1909. Researchers make the observation that what Nelson Mandela finished in 1994, was first pioneered by him and his contemporaries in the 1880s. His influence in Black politics faded with the radicalization of Black workers and the rise of the Communist Party of South Africa (founded in 1919), and the trade union movement and its involvement in the internal struggle against Apartheid. He gradually withdrew from public life and died on 19 April 1936.

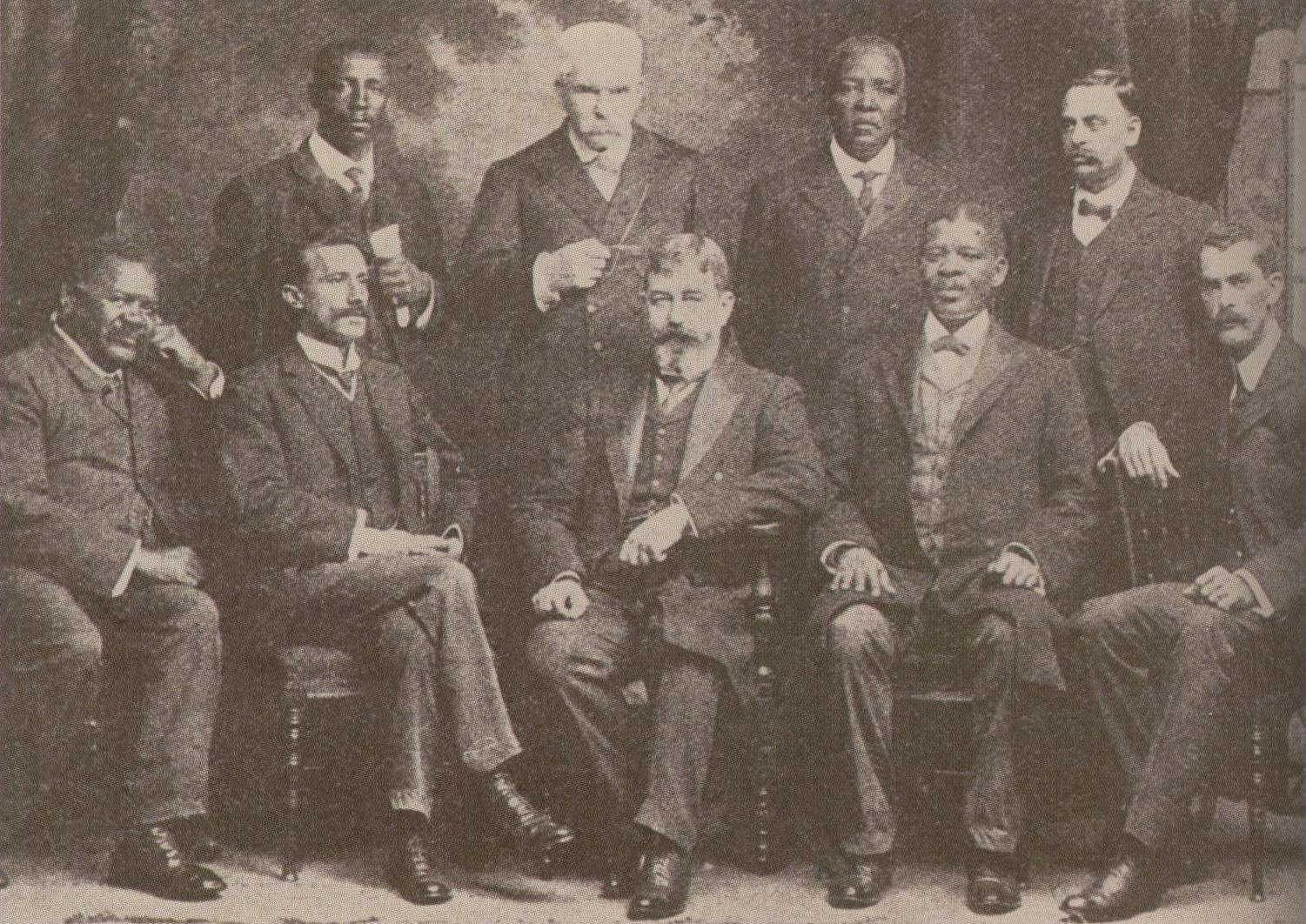
Walter Rabusana and Cape politicians

== Notable achievements ==
- Co-founded Xhosa language newspaper publication Izwi Labantu with John Tengo Jabavu.
- In 1906 he published the seminal work, Zemnk’ Inkomo Magwalandini, a collection of traditional poetry. He also wrote A History of South Africa from the Native Standpoint.
- He was awarded an honorary doctorate by McKinley Memorial University in Louisville, Kentucky in the United States.
- He was awarded an honorary doctorate by the Nelson Mandela University in Port Elizabeth, South Africa.
- Played a pivotal role in activist initiatives and organisations such as the Native Education Association that contributed towards the formation of the South African Native Congress in 1912.
- He was the first African person to be elected to the Cape Council (Parliament) in 1909.
- He was the chair of the Location Advisory Board.
- He assisted in the establishment of more than ten schools in and around East London.
