= John Knox Bokwe =

South African journalist, Presbyterian minister and Xhosa hymn writer

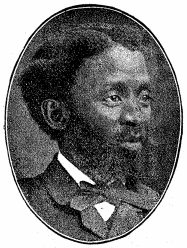
- John Knox Bokwe in approx 1914
- Born: 15 March 1855; Ntselamanzi, Lovedale, South Africa
- Died: 22 February 1922 (aged 66); Ntselamanzi
- Other name: Mdengentonga
- Occupations: Journalist, minister, music composer

John Knox Bokwe (15 March 1855 – 22 February 1922) was a South African journalist, Presbyterian minister and one of the most celebrated Xhosa hymn writers and musician. He is best known for his compositions Vuka Deborah, Plea for Africa, and Marriage Song.

As a young boy, Bokwe ran errands and worked for Dr. James Stewart's family. It was also in their house that he learnt to play the organ and the piano. In the same year Dr. Stewart took him into the general office of the Lovedale Mission as messenger, and later as his secretary, a post he filled until he left Lovedale in 1897. Meanwhile, in 1869, he was admitted into the mission's college department, where he was to remain until 1872.

As an established writer, he joined John Tengo Jabavu in producing the newspaper Imvo Zabantsundu ("African Opinion") in King Williams Town. He played a role in the foundation in 1916 of what is now the University of Fort Hare (originally the South African Native College) in South-Eastern Cape Province.

== Biography ==
=== Early years ===
John Knox Bokwe was born in Ntselamanzi near Lovedale, southeastern Cape Province and was the youngest child of Cholwephi and Lena Bokwe. His father was one of the first students to be enrolled at the Lovedale Mission school, while his mother was daughter of Nxe, one of the first converts of Ntsikana.

Bokwe first went to school at the age of eight or nine, and was taught by William Kobe Ntsikana, grandson of the prophet Ntsikana. In 1867, when he was twelve, he encountered the Stewart family with which he was to become closely associated. It was also in their house that he learnt to play the organ and the piano. In 1866 he was admitted to the preparatory classes at the Lovedale Institution. He continued on to the college in 1869 and finished his schooling four years later.

Bokwe met a young girl, Lettie Ncheni, who was also employed in the Stewart household. She worked there from 1868 to 1873 while attending night classes and from 1871 attended as a day scholar. The two got married in 1878 when Lettie returned from Scotland where she had accompanied Mrs. Stewart for three years.

=== Lovedale Mission: 1867–1897 ===
Dr. Stewart took him into the general office of the Lovedale Mission as messenger in 1867, and later as his secretary. In 1869, he was admitted into the mission's college department. During this time, his love for reading and writing was kindled. As a student, Bokwe was active in the literary society, of which he became chairman.

In 1870 he helped in the printing and production of iNdaba, a Xhosa newspaper produced at Lovedale. When, in 1874, Lovedale obtained its own postal service, Bokwe was appointed manager, and later became head of the telegraph office. He also became conductor of the mission's brass band. From 1875 Bokwe started to compose hymns. His collected compositions were produced in book form in 1885. In 1892, at the invitation of friends in Scotland and England, Bokwe visited these countries, preaching sermons in churches, and telling his listeners about the work of the Lovedale Mission.

=== Imvo Zabantsundu newspaper: 1898–1899 ===
In 1897, after 24 years of service, Bokwe left Lovedale Mission to collaborate with John Tengo Jabavu in producing the Xhosa newspaper Imvo Zabantsundu ("African Opinion") in King Williamstown. Many Xhosa South Africans were critical of the views expressed by Jabavu, in part because Jabavu was an Mfengu, a group regarded as subordinate to and unrepresentative of the Xhosa people. iZwi la Bantu ("The Voice of the People") was founded and published in East London, under the editorship of N. C. Mhala, in opposition to the Imvo Zabantsundu ("African Opinion") newspaper. It was to discourage these accusations that Bokwe, a Xhosa, went to join Jabavu. Bokwe's two years on the newspaper, however, were most frustrating and unhappy and this began to tell on his health. In 1899 he left the Jabavu and the newspaper business for his wife's home at Tsomo, in the Transkei, to recuperate.

=== Missionary and political work: 1900–1920 ===
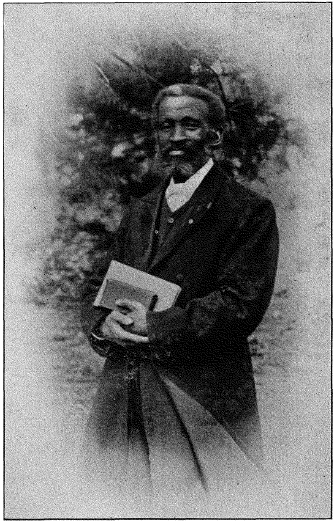
Rev. John Knox Bokwe

While recuperating in Tsomo, Bokwe realized that his real calling was to be a minister, not a journalist. He left Tsomo for the town of Ugie in 1900, where he served first as an evangelist, and then as a probationer. In 1906 he was ordained as a minister of the United Free Church. When Bokwe first arrived at Ugie, there was no school for either black or white in the district. He opened a school for children in the town, at first with no government grant. He then went out into the outlying areas, opening schools and churches.

In 1906, through his efforts, the town of Ugie built its first European school. He also served as town clerk. After years of hard work, his schools flourished until, under the provisions of the Native Private Location Act, African squatters on white farms were turned out, and all but two of Bokwe's schools and churches were obliged to close.

==== Fort Hare College and politics ====
In 1905 Bokwe became a member of the committee, composed of Africans and members of the United Free Church of Scotland, which sought, as a memorial to the late Dr. Stewart, to establish a college of higher education for South African men and women. As a result, largely on the strength of donations collected among the people, Fort Hare College was opened in 1916. In the same year Bokwe was elected general secretary of the Native Teachers Association in the Transkei. Throughout his later life he maintained ties with many prominent figures in the Cape and took an active part in public affairs.

=== Last years: 1921–1922 ===
He was forced to retire in 1920 because of failing health and moved nearer to Lovedale again. In the same year, already in poor health he appeared before the Native Affairs Commission. His last years were spent helping Dr. Henderson, the principal, to translate the metrical psalms into Xhosa. He died at his home at Ntselamanzi, near Lovedale, on February 22, 1922. He was buried in the Gaga Cemetery, alongside other missionaries associated with Lovedale.

== Family Lineage ==
Bokwe was married twice and had six children:

- Barbour Bokwe,
- Rosebery Tandwefika Bokwe, (1900–1963) qualified as a doctor in 1933 and later became active in the African National Congress (ANC).
- Selbourne Bokwe,
- Frieda Bokwe, married "ZK" (Zachariah Keodirelang) Matthews, the educationalist, church leader and African nationalist.
- Pearl Bokwe, Pearl became the wife of Mark Radebe, the composer.
- Waterson Bokwe.

Freida Bokwe was the first African woman to earn a degree at a South African institution and is the grandmother of Naledi Pandor, an ANC member of parliament.

== Other notes ==
John Knox Bokwe's name appears on an autograph quilt made as a local church fundraiser, about 1894. The original quilt is on display at the National Museum of Australia. This rare autograph quilt is one of the earliest known signature quilts in Australia. It includes about 650 embroidered signatures, names, monograms or initials. Only a small number, including prominent figures in late 1890s elite Melbourne society and missionaries in Australia, England and South Africa, have been identified.
