= Lovedale =

Lovedale may refer to:

- Lovedale, New South Wales, a locality in the Hunter Valley of New South Wales
- Lovedale (South Africa), a mission station and educational institute in Eastern Cape Province, South Africa
- Lovedale, India, a Hill Station in Tamil Nadu, India
- Lovedale Press, a publishing company established in Lovedale, South Africa
