= Phyllis Ntantala-Jordan =

South African political activist

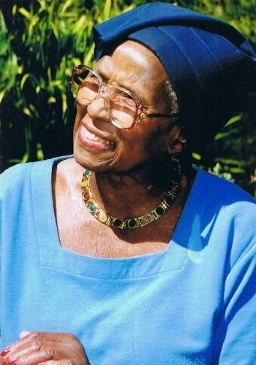
- Phyllis Ntantala-Jordan
- Born: Phyllis Priscilla Ntantala; 7 January 1920; Gqubeni, Dutywa, Cape Province, Union of South Africa
- Died: 17 July 2016 (aged 96); Michigan, United States
- Resting place: Forest Hill Cemetery, Madison, Wisconsin
- Education: Healdtown; University of Fort Hare; University of Cape Town; University of South Africa; Madison Area Technical College
- Occupations: Political activist; Author; Teacher
- Known for: Activism against apartheid; advocacy for African women's rights
- Notable work: Let's Hear Them Speak; A Life's Mosaic: The Autobiography of Phyllis Ntantala
- Spouse: Archibald Campbell Jordan
- Children: Pallo Jordan
- Awards: Honorary Doctorate of Philosophy, University of Fort Hare

Phyllis Ntantala-Jordan (born Phyllis Priscilla Ntantala; 7 January 1920 – 17 July 2016) was a South African political activist and author. She and literary historian Archibald Campbell Jordan were the parents of politician Pallo Jordan.

== Personal life ==
Phyllis Priscilla "Nogqaza" Ntantala was born on 7 January 1920 at Gqubeni, along the bends of the Nqabarha River, Dutywa in the Cape Province (now Eastern Cape), in the Union of South Africa. Ntantala-Jordan's father, George Govan Ntantala was a prosperous farmer who served on the Transkei General Council, iBhunga and her mother, Ida Balfour, was a descendant of the earliest African Christian community, founded by the prophet Ntsikana during the second decade of the 19th century in the Eastern Cape. In describing her upbringing, Ntantala-Jordan said, "Like Trotsky, I did not leave home without the proverbial one-and-six in my pocket. I came from a family of landed gentry in the Transkei". Ntantala-Jordan started her schooling at the age of four years. Six months later, she lost her mother. After completing Standard 6 (Grade 8), then aged 12, Ntantala-Jordan was sent to Healdtown. Healdtown was highly recommended to her father over Lovedale by her primary school principal Rhodes Cakata. Ntantala says at Healdtown students were treated equally despite their background and smaller than Lovedale. At 15, Ntantala was awarded the Transkeian Bhunga Scholarship to study at the University of Fort Hare. At the time, Fort Hare, although offering degrees, admitted students for matric studies. After completing her matric, she completed a teachers' diploma at the University of Fort Hare in 1937. Ntantala-Jordan began working at Bantu High School in Kroonstad as a teacher in 1938. In 1939, Ntantala-Jordan married isiXhosa writer Archibald Campbell Jordan, whom she had met during her time at Fort Hare University.

In 1945, following the appointment of AC Jordan as lecturer of Bantu Languages at Fort Hare, the Jordans, then with two children, and a third on the way, left Kroonstad for the Eastern Cape. However, Their stay at the University of Fort Hare was short-lived. In 1946, AC Jordan moved with his family to Cape Town after he successfully applied for a lectureship in Bantu Languages at the University of Cape Town (UCT). In 1957, Dr Ntantala-Jordan registered at the University of Cape Town for a Higher Diploma in Native Law and Administration. She would later obtain qualifications from the University of South Africa, the Madison Area Technical College as well as an honorary Doctorate in Philosophy from the University of Fort Hare. Due to the political pressures exerted by the then apartheid South African government during the late 1950s and 1960s, the Jordans went into exile in 1961. The Jordans moved to America, where they and their two children are laid to rest. Ntantala-Jordan died at the age of 96 in Michigan on 17 July 2016. She was 96 years old. She was laid to rest at the Forest Hill Cemetery in Madison, Wisconsin on 30 July 2016. Ntantala-Jordan and AC Jordan are survived by their son Pallo Jordan.

== Political work ==
Ntantala-Jordan attributes her political awakening to her time as a teacher at Bantu High School in Kroonstad. In describing her political awakening, Ntantala-Jordan says "I always tell people that it was my experience in the Free State that really roused to anger my social consciousness...Most of our students in Kroonstad did not see a future beyond their school. They remained in school because it was a better place than life in the location. I knew that something was wrong somewhere." When her family moved to Moshesh Avenue in the Langa location after her husband AC Jordan's appointment at the University of Cape Town in 1946, Ntantala-Jordan fought hard to ensure her family moved out of the township. In October 1946, after months of house-hunting in the then white areas (under Group Areas Act), the Jordans wrote to Governor General Mr Brownlee, requesting permission to purchase a lot from a Mr Guttman in Fleur Street, Lincoln Estate, Cape Town. In November, the Jordans acquired permission to buy the lot from Mr Guttman becoming one of the first African families to do so in the area. They named their residence "Thabisano", a place of rejoicing. The Jordans never sent their children to African schools as the government demanded but sent them to St Marks English Church in Athlone, Rosmead and Livingstone High School in Claremont.

During her first five years in Cape Town, in the late 1940s and early 1950s, while she was raising their children, she "was busy with political work and in the Cape African Teachers' Association".The issues that CATA focused in the early 1950s revolved around the condemnation of the Group Areas Act of 1950, the Bantu Authorities Act of 1951, the Jan van Riebeeck celebrations at the Grand Parade in Cape Town in 1952 and the Bantu Education Act of 1953. Ntantala-Jordan wrote "Ukwayo:Isikrweqe nekhakha", an isiXhosa translation of I.B Tabata's "Boycott as a weapon of struggle", which was widely distributed by the Society of Young Africa (SOYA) in Transkei. Ntantala-Jordan made a speech at the largest rally in opposition to the celebration of Jan van Riebeeck on 4 April 1952, two days before the celebration which were scheduled for 6 April. Ntantala-Jordan describes the celebrations as a flop for the government and a success for the people's boycott.

In 1957, Ntantala-Jordan was asked to contribute an article for a magazine called Africa South on "African women" by Ronnie Segal she chose to write about the "other women whom nobody ever hears about, whose story had never been told, because they are not the `pillars' of their societies". According to her, these "were some of the girls I had grown up with, now married and living the lives of widows, as their menfolk were away in the cities". Her second article in this magazine was entitled "The Widows of the Reserves" which was later translated to Flemish, French and Dutch.

During the State of emergency as a result of the Sharpeville massacre and Langa protest of 21 March 1960, there was general harassment of blacks. AC Jordan was arrested and assaulted on 4 April 1960, five days after the declaration of the State of Emergency. Against this background, the Jordan opted to moved to the United States of America. In early in 1961, AC Jordan was awarded a Carnegie Travel Grant to visit universities and colleges in the US. When he was denied a passport, he opted for an exit permit. His family followed him in 1962 and they ended up in the United States of America.

== Legacy ==
Ntantala-Jordan is remembered as an intellectual, an author and an outspoken political activist. In describing her role in the struggle for liberation, The African National Congress said "the passing of Mama Phyllis Ntantala-Jordan has robbed South Africa and the world at large of an astute, inquisitive and inspiring mind. We have lost a champion of gender equality for African women in particular..."

Ntantala-Jordan translated into English her husband AC Jordan's novel, Ingqumbo Yeminyanya, spoke at a number of public lectures, wrote essays, a book Let's Hear Them Speak, a book amplifying the voices of many unsung heroines being South African women and her autobiography: A Life's Mosaic: The Autobiography of Phyllis Ntantala.

== Relevant literature ==
- Ndlela, Ndela. 2019. "'Firing with the pen': Centering the intellectual legacy of Phyllis Ntantala-Jordan". South African Journal of African Languages 40.1:26-31.
