= R. H. W. Shepherd =

Scots-born minister and biblical scholar

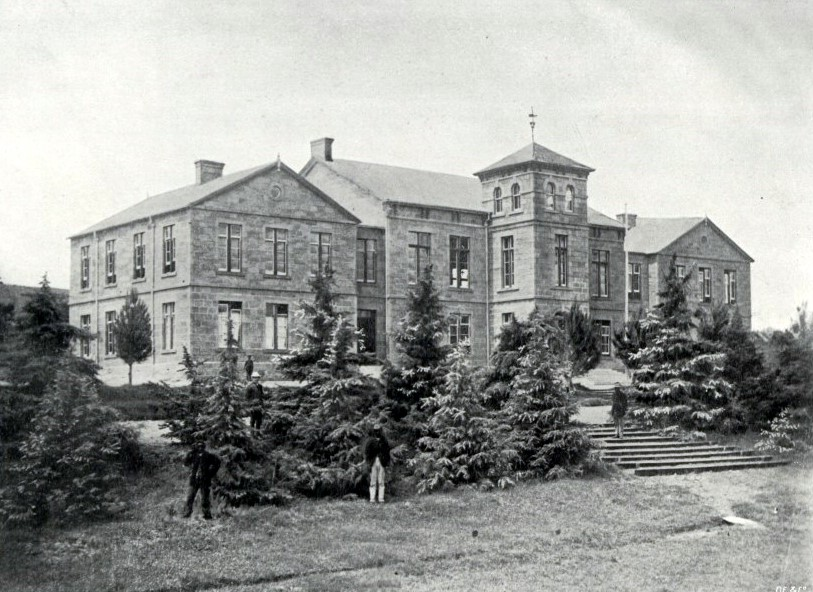
Lovedale Mission Station, South Africa

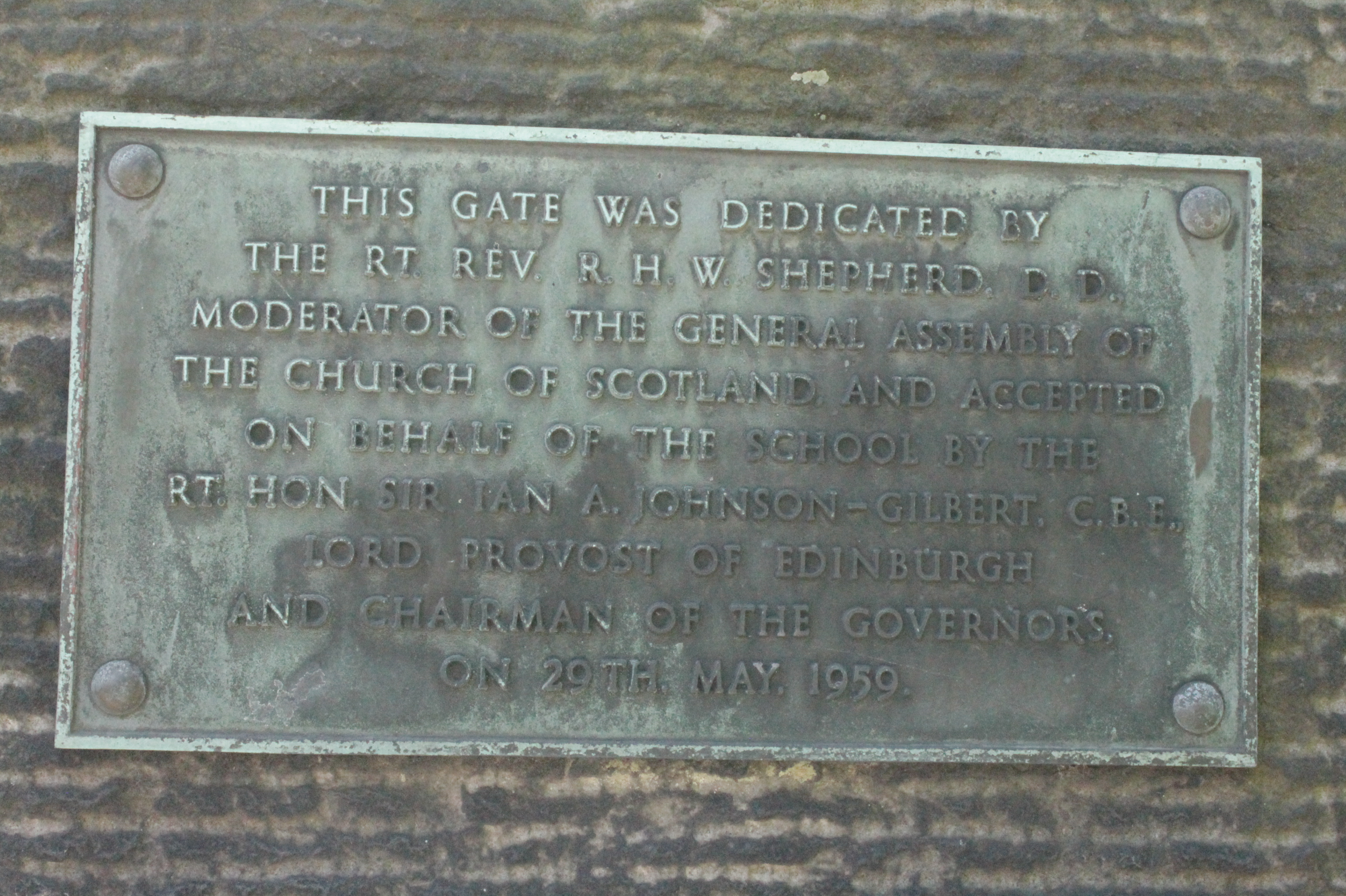
Memorial plaque to Rev R H W Shepherd in Greyfriars Kirkyard, commemorating the new gate to George Heriot's School added in 1959

Robert Henry Wishart Shepherd (1888–1971) was a 20th-century Scots-born minister and biblical scholar serving in South Africa firstly for the United Free Church of Scotland then for the Church of Scotland. He served as Moderator of the General Assembly of the Church of Scotland in 1959. He was Director of the Lovedale Mission from 1930 to 1955.

== Life ==
He was born near Dundee in Scotland in 1888. He was ordained as a minister in the United Free Church of Scotland in 1918 and sent to South Africa as a missionary in 1920. In 1929 the United Free Church merged with the Church of Scotland and Shepherd was thereafter a Church of Scotland minister/missionary. He moved to the Lovedale Mission soon after the merge.

In 1932 he also took over as main editor of the Lovedale Press and the South African Outlook. In these he specifically promoted African writing and African self-consciousness, promoting a new-born pride in being a black South African.

He went from South Africa to Scotland in 1955 and served as Moderator in 1959/60 being succeeded by Very Rev J. H. S. Burleigh. His role during the year included membership of the Monckton Commission looking at the Federation of Rhodesia with Nyasaland. The Nyasaland debates ended in the creation of Malawi. He returned to South Africa in 1960/61 as minister of the Presbyterian Church in Alice.

He died in South Africa in 1971.

== Publications ==
- The Humanism of Jesus: A Study in Christ's Human Sympathies. J. Clarke & Co. 1926.
- The Bantu 1927
- Children of the veld: Bantu vignettes. London: J. Clark & Co. 1937.
- Though Mountains Shake 1940
- Lovedale, South Africa: The Story of a Century, 1841-1941. Lovedale Press. 1940.
- African Contrasts. The Story of a South African People. [With Illustrations.]. Cape Town. 1947.
- Where aloes flame: South African missionary vignettes. London: Lutterworth Press. 1948.
- Lovedale and Literature for the Bantu: A Brief History and a Forecast. Lovedale Press. 1945.
