= Ngcuka =

Ngcuka is a surname. Notable people with the surname include:

- Bulelani Ngcuka (born 1954), South African attorney, prosecutor and activist
- Phumzile Mlambo-Ngcuka (born 1955), South African politician
