= Xhosa literature =

Xhosa literature is the spoken and written literature of the Xhosa people of Southern Africa. The Xhosa language is spoken in South Africa and Zimbabwe.

== 20th-century literature ==
Poet and teacher St John Page Yako wrote poetry using motifs derived from oral literature to describe the consequences of disastrous land politics of mid-century South Africa.

=== Notable poets ===
- Sipho Burns-Ncamashe
- William Wellington Gqoba
- Samuel Edward Krune Mqhayi
- Enoch Sontonga
- St John Page Yako
