= Archibald Campbell Jordan =

South African novelist and literary historian

Archibald Campbell Mzolisa Jordan
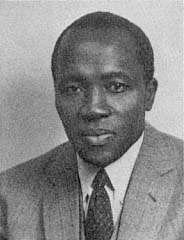
- Born: Archibald Campbell Mzolisa Jordan; 30 October 1906; Mbokothwane Mission, Pondoland, Cape Colony
- Died: 20 October 1968 (aged 61); Madison, Wisconsin, United States
- Citizenship: South African
- Occupations: Novelist; Academic
- Known for: Pioneering African studies in South Africa.
- Spouse: Phyllis Ntantala-Jordan
- Children: Pallo Jordan

Academic background
- Education: Lovedale College; University of Fort Hare; University of Cape Town

Academic work
- Notable works: Ingqumbo Yezinyanya

Archibald Campbell Mzolisa "A.C." Jordan (30 October 1906 – 20 October 1968) was a novelist, literary historian and intellectual pioneer of African studies in South Africa.

== Early life ==
He was born at the Mbokothwane Mission in the Tsolo district, Pondoland (later Transkei), the son of an Anglican church minister. Jordan trained as a teacher at St John's College, Mthatha, completed his junior certificate at Lovedale College, Alice, and then won a scholarship to Fort Hare University College. His literary and linguistic training consisted in a BA Degree (1934), followed by a Master's thesis, submitted to the University of Cape Town (UCT) in 1942. His thesis was entitled "Some features of the phonetic and grammatical structure of Baca" (Bhaca), and was an important early contribution to the study of non-standard Nguni languages, specifically of a Tekela Nguni language. This was followed in 1957 by a doctoral degree dissertation "A Phonological and Grammatical Study of Literary Xhosa.

== Writing career ==
While teaching in Kroonstad (in the then Orange Free State Province) between 1934 and 1944 Jordan mastered Sotho, became president of the African Teachers' Association, and started his writing career with the publication of poetry in the newspaper Imvo Zabantsundu. He also started work on his classic Xhosa novel, Ingqumbo Yeminyanya (1940), later translated by the author and his wife, Phyllis Ntantala-Jordan, into English as The Wrath of the Ancestors (1980). This novel, considered as one of the masterpieces of Xhosa writing and South African literature, was translated into Afrikaans as Die Toorn van die Voorvaders, published in 1990, and a Dutch translation, De Wraak van het Voorgeslacht, appearing in the classic African Writers Series in the Netherlands in 1999. The novel tells a gripping epic-tragic tale of the conflicting forces of Western education and Xhosa traditional beliefs amongst the "School people" and the "Ochre people" of the Mpondomise people.

After a brief stint as senior lecturer in Bantu languages at the Fort Hare University College, beginning 1944, Jordan was appointed senior lecturer in African languages at the University of Cape Town (UCT) in 1946. He worked in that capacity until September 1961.

While at UCT he began a new method of teaching Xhosa to non-mother tongue speakers, which he published as A Practical Course in Xhosa (1966).

== Exile ==
In 1961 Jordan was offered a Carnegie bursary to do research in the United States, but was refused a passport by the South African government. As a result of political pressure, Jordan was forced to leave South Africa on an exit permit. He settled in America where he was appointed professor in African Languages and Literature at the University of California, Los Angeles, and later moved, in similar capacity, to the University of Wisconsin–Madison. In 1968, Jordan died in Madison, after a long illness.

One eminent South African scholar who studied Xhosa under Jordan's guidance was the writer and academic, Vernon February. Decades later he still testified to the enormous influence Jordan had on those students, and the inspiring and vital knowledge he imparted about Xhosa culture and language. Similarly, Carol Eastman recounted, in Johannesburg, at the "Sociolinguistics in Africa" conference organised by Bob Herbert, her inspiration for African culture and language instilled by Jordan when he taught her Xhosa at the University of Wisconsin–Madison in the 1960s. She said there was a "quiet sadness" about Jordan, living as he was in exile, very far from home.

Jordan's other important publications include a book of short stories entitled Kwezo Mpindo zeTsitsa, published in 1973 as Tales from Southern Africa, and an important pioneering critical study, entitled Towards an African Literature: The Emergence of Literary Form in Xhosa (1972).

== Legacy ==
For his creative works, his pioneering research and his sustained efforts at preserving and recording in his writing the culture and history of the Xhosa people of the Eastern Cape, the University of Port Elizabeth currently known as Nelson Mandela University (NMU) posthumously bestowed on Jordan an honorary doctorate in literature, on 24 April 2004.

He was awarded posthumously the Order of Ikhamanga in Gold in 2005.

In 2015 the University of Cape Town renamed the Arts Block after Jordan in recognition of his work.
