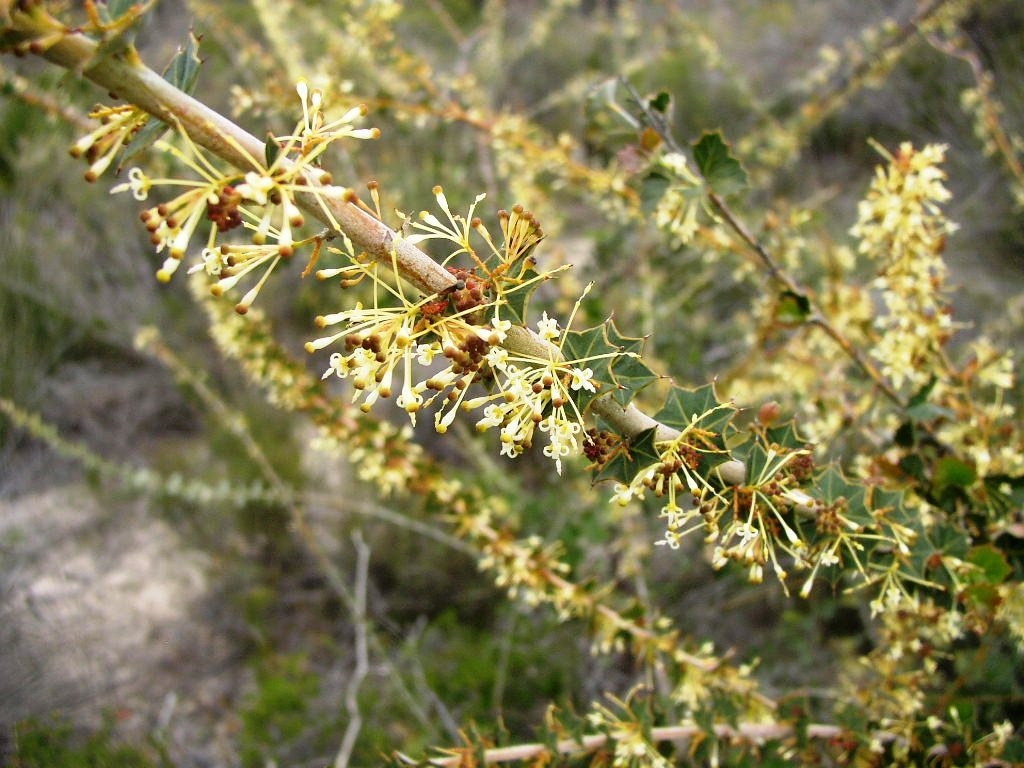

Conservation status
- Priority Three — Poorly Known Taxa (DEC)

Scientific classification
- Kingdom: Plantae
- Clade: Tracheophytes
- Clade: Angiosperms
- Clade: Eudicots
- Order: Proteales
- Family: Proteaceae
- Genus: Grevillea
- Species: G. uniformis

Binomial name
- Grevillea uniformis (McGill.) Olde & Marriott

Synonyms
- Grevillea acrobotrya subsp. uniforma McGill. orth. var.; Grevillea acrobotrya subsp. uniformis McGill.

= Grevillea uniformis =

Species of shrub endemic to Western Australia

Grevillea uniformis is species of flowering plant in the family Proteaceae and is endemic to the south-west of Western Australia. It is a shrub with broadly egg-shaped to fan-shaped leaves with sharply tipped teeth or lobes, and more or less spherical clusters of white flowers.

== Description ==
Grevillea uniformis is a shrub that typically grows to a height of 0.8–1.8 m (2 ft 7 in – 5 ft 11 in) and has woolly-hairy branchlets. Its leaves are broadly egg-shaped to fan-shaped in outline, 5–20 mm (0.20–0.79 in) long and 8–30 mm (0.31–1.18 in) wide on a short petiole, with 7 to 11 sharply-pointed teeth or triangular lobes up to 5 mm (0.20 in) long. The flowers are arranged in more or less spherical clusters on a rachis 10–20 mm (0.39–0.79 in) long, each flower on a glabrous pedicel 5–9 mm (0.20–0.35 in) long. The flowers are glabrous and white with a dark-to reddish-brown tip, the pistil 2.5–3.5 mm (0.098–0.138 in) long. Flowering occurs from July to November, and the fruit is a smooth, oblong follicle 8–10 mm (0.31–0.39 in) long.

== Taxonomy ==
This species was first formally described in 1986 by Donald MacGillivray who gave it the name Grevillea acrobotrya subsp. uniformis in his book New Names in Grevillea (Proteaceae) from specimens collected by Barbara Briggs near Mount Lesueur in 1976. It was raised to species status in 1993 by Peter Olde and Neil Marriott in the journal Nuytsia. The specific epithet (uniformis) means "uniform", referring to the shape of the leaves.

== Distribution ==
This grevillea grows along creeklines and on sandstone outcrops in sandy to sandy-loamy soils on sandstone or in lateritic gravel in low, open heath. It is found from near Eneabba and south to Jurien Bay and Mount Lesueur, in the Geraldton Sandplains and Swan Coastal Plain bioregions of south-western Western Australia.

== Conservation status ==
Grevillea uniformis is listed as "Priority Three" by the Government of Western Australia Department of Biodiversity, Conservation and Attractions, meaning that it is poorly known and known from only a few locations but is not under imminent threat.

== See also ==
- List of Grevillea species
