= Makhosazana Xaba =

South African poet (born 1957)

- Born: 1957 (age 68–69); Greytown, KwaZulu-Natal, South Africa
- Other name: Khosi Xaba
- Education: University of the Witwatersrand
- Occupations: Poet and short-story writer
- Employer: University of Johannesburg
- Awards: South African Literary Awards Short Story Award

Makhosazana Xaba (born 10 July 1957) is a South African poet and short-story writer. She trained as a nurse and has worked a women's health specialist in NGOs, as well as writing on gender and health. She is Associate Professor of Practice in the Faculty of Humanities at the University of Johannesburg.

== Biography ==
Makhosazana (Khosi) Xaba was born in Greytown, KwaZulu-Natal, South Africa, to Glenrose Nomvula Mbatha and Rueben Bejanmin Xaba, the second of five children. She has an MA degree in creative writing from the University of the Witwatersrand (Wits University) and is working on a biography of Noni Jabavu.

Xaba won the Deon Hofmeyr Award for Creative Writing (2005) for her unpublished short story "Running". Her poems have appeared in publications including Timbila, Sister Namibia, Botsotso, South African Writing, Green Dragon and Echoes, and have been collected in These Hands (2005) and Tongues of Their Mothers (2008). A book of her short stories, Running and Other Stories, was published in 2013, and won the 2014 Nadine Gordimer South African Literary Awards Short Story Award.

Xaba is editor of the 2016 anthology Like the Untouchable Wind: An Anthology of Poems, about "the life, experience and visions of African lesbians".

She is also a contributor to the 2019 anthology New Daughters of Africa, edited by Margaret Busby.

In 2022, Xaba co-edited (with Bhekizizwe Peterson and Khwezi Mkhize) Foundational African Writers, a book of essays celebrating the centenaries of Peter Abrahams, Noni Jabavu, Sibusiso Nyembezi and Es'kia Mphahlele, who were all born in 1919. It was described as "a visionary project" by Carli Coetzee of the Journal of African Cultural Studies and professor Mpalive Msiska stated: "This well-crafted collection recovers the seminal position of four of the most important twenty-first-century African writers who have been absent from the canon and recalibrates the distinctive development of African literature."

With Athambile Masola, Xaba introduced the book Noni Jabavu: A Stranger at Home, a collection of Jabavu's Daily Dispatch columns, published in 2023.

In 2024, Xaba's Zulu-language translation of Frantz Fanon's final book, The Wretched of the Earth (1961), was published as Izimpabanga Zomhlaba by Inkani Books.

== Works ==
- These Hands: Poems. Timbila Poetry Project, Elim Hospital, Limpopo Province, 2005. Poetry. ISBN 978-0958464086.
- Tongues of Their Mothers. Scottsville: University of KwaZulu-Natal Press, 2008. Poetry. ISBN 978-1869141448.
- Running and Other Stories. Cape Town: Modjaji Books, 2013. Fiction. ISBN 978-1920590161.

=== As editor ===
- (with Karen Martin) Queer Africa: New and Collected Fiction. Johannesburg: MaThoko's Books, 2013. ISBN 9781920590338.
- Like the Untouchable Wind: An Anthology of Poems. Harare: MaThoko's Books, 2016. Poetry anthology. ISBN 9781928215479.
- (with Crystal Biruk) Proudly Malawian: Life Stories from Lesbian and Gender-nonconforming Individuals. Johannesburg: MaThoko's Books, 2016. ISBN 9781928215103.
- (with Karen Martin) Queer Africa 2: New Stories. Johannesburg: MaThoko's Books, 2017. ISBN 9781928215424.
- The Alkalinity of Bottled Water. Botsotso Publishing, 2019. Poetry. ISBN 9780994708168
- Our Words, Our Worlds: Writing on Black South African Women Poets, 2000-2018. Pietermaritzburg: UKZN Press, 2019. ISBN 9781869144128.
- (With Bhekizizwe Peterson and Khwezi Mkhize) Foundational African Writers: Peter Abrahams, Noni Jabavu, Sibusiso Nyembezi and Es'kia Mphahlele. Foreword by Simon Gikandi. Johannesburg: Wits University Press, 2022. ISBN 978-1776147519.
