= Noni Jabavu =

South African writer and journalist (1919–2008)

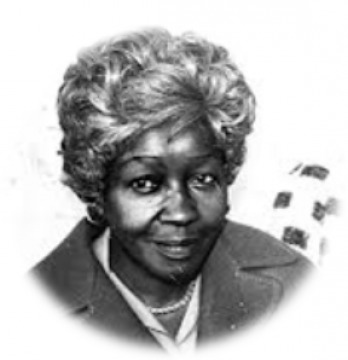
- Born: Helen Nontando Jabavu; 20 August 1919; Middledrift, Eastern Cape, South Africa
- Died: 19 June 2008 (aged 88); Lynette Elliott Frail Care Home in Selborne, East London, Eastern Cape, South Africa
- Education: The Mount School, York; Royal Academy of Music
- Occupations: Writer, journalist and editor
- Notable work: Drawn in Colour (1960); The Ochre People (1963)
- Spouse(s): Michael Cadbury Crosfield, m. 1951
- Parent(s): Davidson Don Tengo Jabavu and Thandiswa Florence Makiwane
- Relatives: John Tengo Jabavu (grandfather); Cecilia Makiwane (maternal aunt)

Helen Nontando (Noni) Jabavu (20 August 1919 – 19 June 2008) was a South African writer and journalist, one of the first African women to pursue a successful literary career and the first black South African woman to publish books of autobiography. Educated in Britain from the age of 13, she became the first African woman to be the editor of a British literary magazine when in 1961 she took on the editorship of The New Strand, a revived version of The Strand Magazine, which had closed in 1950.

In the words of poet Makhosazana Xaba: "One only has to read her two books (Drawn in Colour and The Ochre People) to realize just how skilled she was as a memoirist. Her journalistic column editorials demonstrate a reflective style that must have been unusual for her times. While interviewing Wally Serote who was living in Botswana during the same time as Noni, I learned something that confirmed my initial thoughts on her. 'We men, she said, did not know how to relate to her (Noni). She was a woman living far ahead of our times.' This speaks volumes considering Serote himself is a world-wise literary and cultural giant."

== Biography ==
=== Early years and education in England ===
Noni Jabavu was born in Middledrift in the Eastern Cape into a family of intellectuals, the marriage of her parents forging a union between two of the most prominent Christian families in the Eastern Cape at the time. Her mother was Thandiswa Florence Makiwane, founder of Zenzele Woman's Self-Improvement Association; her father was the activist and author Davidson Don Tengo Jabavu, and her grandfather John Tengo Jabavu, was an editor of South Africa's first newspaper to be written in Xhosa, Imvo Zabantsundu (Black Opinion). Her maternal aunt was Cecilia Makiwane, the first African registered professional nurse in South Africa and an early activist in the struggle for women's rights.

From the age of 13, Noni was educated in England, under the guardianship of Margaret and Arthur Bevington Gillett (alongside Mohan Kumaramangalam and his sister Parvati Krishnan), and she would continue to live there for many years. She later recalled: "Like a typical black child of those days, at 13 I was not too well primed about the negotiations that must have gone on between my parents and my prospective loco-parents, about the life they were planning for me which I was to learn in years to come, was to be a practical demonstration of the generations of friendship between families. I learned then that the plan was for me to be trained as a doctor to serve my people. But it misfired, for a medical doctor was the one thing I didn't want to be. I didn't know what I wanted to be."

Jabavu studied first at The Mount School, York, and later at London's Royal Academy of Music. Before the Second World War she had become uninterested in the Royal Academy of Music and concentrated mostly on left-wing student politics. In 1938, she was at a Prom concert in the Queen's Hall that was interrupted to be told of Neville Chamberlain's "peace for our time" settlement.

=== Post-war life: visits to South Africa and memoirs ===
On the outbreak of the Second World War, Jabavu gave up studying to be a film technician and trained to become a semi-skilled engineer and oxyacetylene welder, working on bomber engine parts. After the war, she remained in London, where she married Denis Preston, jazz critic, radio presenter, journalist and record producer. She became a features writer and television personality, and worked for the BBC as a presenter and as a producer. She paid extended visits to South Africa until her marriage to the English film director Michael Cadbury Crosfield in 1951. Their marriage broke South Africa's miscegenation laws and because of the Immorality Act then in force, he could not accompany her. Thereafter, she also travelled and lived in Mozambique, Zimbabwe and Uganda.

Jabavu began to write during the years she was in Uganda. In 1955, she returned to South Africa for a three-month stay, writing of that trip in the Author's Note of her first book, Drawn in Colour: African Contrasts (1960):

I belong to two worlds with two loyalties: South Africa, where I was born, and England, where I was educated. When I received a cable sent by my father, I flew back to South Africa to be amongst my Bantu people, leaving my English husband behind in London. Later that year, he and I went to live in East Africa, to be near my only sister who had married out there. I've told here something of my own background and circumstances. This is a personal account of an individual African's experiences and impressions of the differences between East and South Africa in their contact with Westernization.

Drawn in Colour was well reviewed on both sides of the Atlantic. As Kirkus Reviews stated: "This book richly deserves the high praise it has received in England where it was first published. The author, who is married to a British film director, tells of a voyage home to South Africa for the funeral of her brother who had been murdered by a gangster in Jo'burg, and of her vain attempts to save the marriage of her sister to a man in Uganda. Although concerned with two family tragedies, the story is neither sad nor morbid. A wealth of detail about African life and custom and graphic descriptions of the country itself keep the reader engrossed whenever the principal actors leave the scene temporarily. It is strongly flavored with the Xhosa language, which translates most nearly into poetic Elizabethan English. The author spares neither herself nor her people in dealing with racial issues, for prejudice exists on all sides, even between lighter and darker members of the same tribe. The reader will surely share in a great human experience and at the same time gain a greater understanding of emerging autonomous nations." Drawn in Colour was reprinted five times within the first year of its publication, and was also published in Italian in Milan under the title Il colore della pelle.

After years of living in Uganda, Jabavu returned with her husband to England, and from the beginning of 1961 she was a member of staff of the literary magazine John O'London's Weekly. She also did editorial work for The New Strand (the revived version of a century-old monthly renowned for publishing Conan Doyle), before being selected as its editor, a choice its proprietor Ernest Kay explained by saying: "Miss Jabavu has led such a varied life that she will bring a completely fresh outlook to the magazine. She certainly couldn't be conventional if she tried." She took up the role in December 1961, though resigned after eight months, deciding that she preferred to be a writer than an editor.

Describing herself as "a married woman first and a career woman second", she subsequently moved to Jamaica, where in 1961 her husband was appointed as films adviser to the government, returning to London in 1963. (A review she would write two decades later of V. S. Naipaul's travelogue The Middle Passage reveals her discomfort during this Caribbean sojourn: "...I was disturbed, dismayed to find myself haunted by an inability to enjoy living in this reputedly most beautiful of enchanting islands. ... Rootlessness, a historical sense of dereliction, absence of tradition, search for identity-- these characteristics impressed me during conversations with West Indians. As an African, I possessed a heritage embedded in my language, tribal loyalties, stored treasures of legends, events. Do not these give any African a fortunate sense of continuity? Whatever deprivations apartheid imposes on us in my own country, these can never efface the strengths and traditions of our people.")

Jabavu's second book, The Ochre People: Scenes from a South African Life, published in 1963, was also a memoir, of which she said: "It is a personal account of an individual African's experiences and impressions of the differences between East and South Africans in their contact with Westernization." It too received acclaim, hailed by critics as "brilliant" and "fascinating". The review in Ebony magazine noted: "Exploring the rich culture and traditions of her South African Bantu background, the author illustrated the stresses that occur when old ways must be adapted to the solution of new problems."

=== Later years ===
During time spent in South Africa in 1976–77, researching a book about her father, Jabavu published a weekly column in the East London (Eastern Cape) newspaper Daily Dispatch, under the editorship of Donald Woods.

She was awarded a lifetime achievement award by former Arts and Culture Minister Pallo Jordan, as well as a best literature award in the Eastern Cape by the then sports, art and culture minister, Nosimo Balindlela.

Noni Jabavu died at the age of 88 in June 2008, at Lynette Elliott Frail Care Home, and was buried in East London, South Africa. Her legacy continues as she leaves behind her relatives, Mxolise Jabavu and others.

== Legacy and influence ==
Jabavu's family was reportedly in the process of making a documentary film about her life, started by Duma kaNdlovu (creator of the television show Muvhango), when funds provided by the Eastern Cape Arts Culture Council ran out.

Jabavu has been cited as a role model by Margaret Busby, the first Black African woman to found a publishing company in the UK, in 1967, who a few years earlier while still at school had read about Jabavu. Writing by Jabavu was included in Busby's 1992 anthology Daughters of Africa.

The book Noni Jabavu: A Stranger at Home, a collection of her Daily Dispatch columns compiled and introduced by Makhosazana Xaba and Athambile Masola, was published in 2023.

In 2022, the book Nontando Noni Jabavu 1919–2008 was published by writer, editor and anthologist Asanda Sizani.

== Bibliography ==
- Drawn in Colour (London: John Murray, 1960; New York: St Martin's Press, 1962)
- The Ochre People (London: John Murray, 1963; New York: St Martin's Press, 1963; extracted in Daughters of Africa, edited by Margaret Busby, 1992).
- Noni Jabavu: A Stranger at Home, introduced by Makhosazana Xaba and Athambile Masola, 2023, NB Publishers, ISBN 9780624089360.
- Asanda Sizani (ed.), Nontando Noni Jabavu 1919–2008, Legacy Creates, 2022, ISBN 9780639719689.
