= St John Page Yako =

St John Page Yako (1901 – 1977) was a Qokolweni-born Xhosa poet and professor of Xhosa literature in the Eastern Cape, South Africa. A translation of one of his poems was published as "The Contraction and Enclosure of the Land" in The Lava of the Land, an anthology of South-African poetry edited by Denis Hirson. "The Contraction and Enclosure" uses imagery from oral poetry to illustrate the consequences of race-based land legislation of South Africa in the 1950s that destroyed the traditional ways of life of many tribes.

== Bibliography ==
- Umtha Welenga ("Ray of the Sun", 1959)
- Ikwezi ("Poems", 1959)
