= John Tengo Jabavu =

South African author and political activist

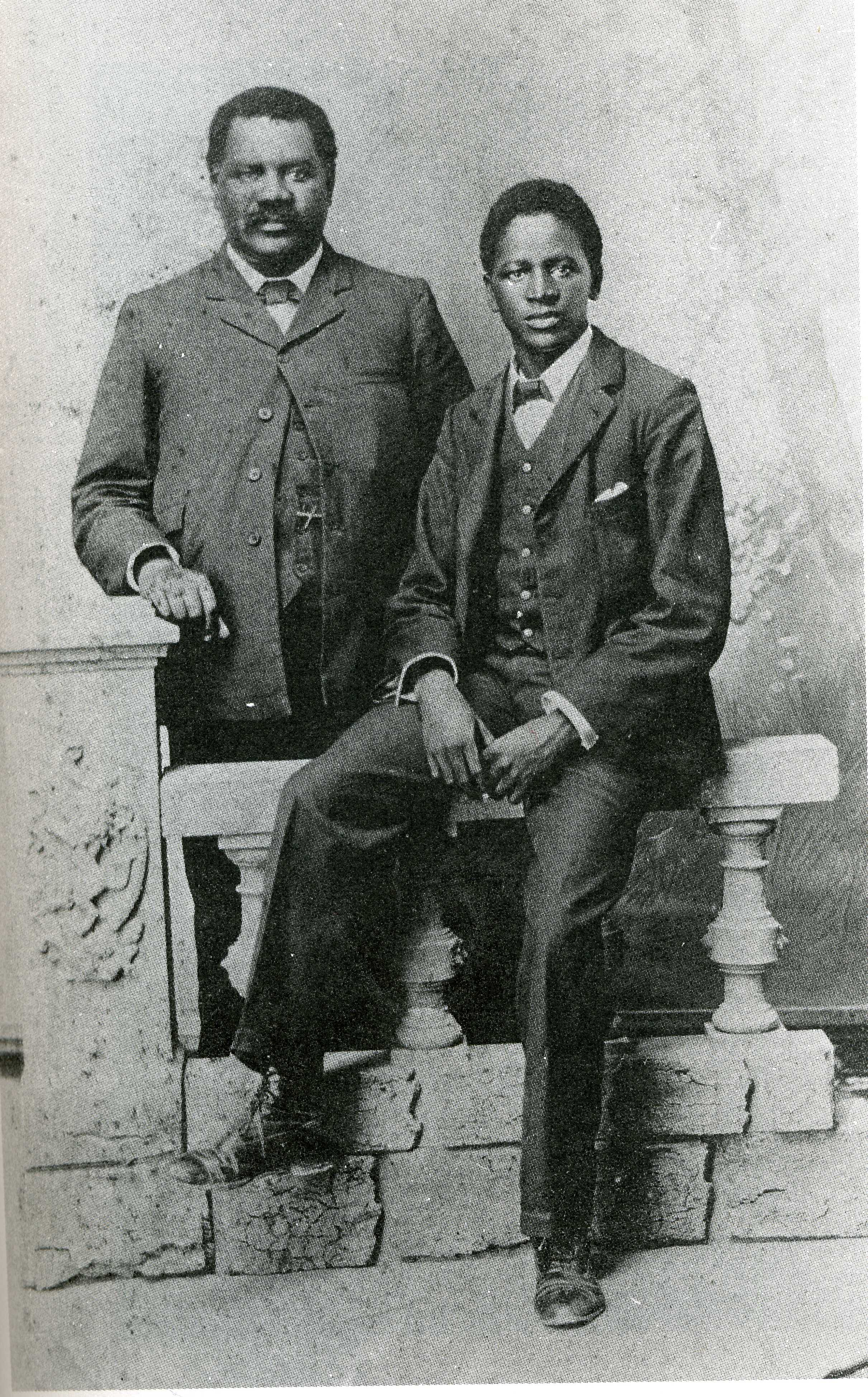
- John Tengo Jabavu (left) and his son Davidson Don Tengo Jabavu, around 1903
- Born: 11 January 1859; Healdtown, Eastern Cape, South Africa
- Died: 10 September 1921 (aged 62); Fort Hare, Eastern Cape, South Africa
- Occupations: Political activist, editor
- Known for: Founder of first Xhosa language newspaper in South Africa
- Spouse(s): Elda Sakuba, m. 1885–1900 (her death); Gertrude Joninga, m. 1901-
- Children: Davidson Don Tengo Jabavu, Alexander Macaulay Jabavu, two other sons and three daughters
- Relatives: Noni Jabavu (granddaughter)

John Tengo Jabavu (11 January 1859 – 10 September 1921) was a political activist and the editor of South Africa's first Xhosa-language newspaper.

== Early life ==
John Tengo Jabavu was born on 11 January 1859 near Healdtown in the Cape Colony. In 1875 he graduated from the Methodist mission school at Healdtown and became a teacher at Somerset East. While teaching, he began to write articles for some South African newspapers and he apprenticed himself to a printer. In 1881, Jabavu was invited by Reverend James Stewart of the Lovedale Mission School to become the editor of the institution's Xhosa-language journal, Isigidimi samaXhosa ("The Xhosa Messenger").

== Career ==
By the early 1880s Jabavu had become an important political force. His writings tended to focus on the threat of growing Afrikaner nationalism and his demands for equal rights for Cape Colony's Xhosa population. Tengo Jabavu was also known as a proponent of women's rights as well as public education.

In recognition of his political influence, a group of prominent Cape Colony political figures approached Tengo Jabavu in 1883 with a request for him to stand for election to the Cape Parliament. They recommended that he represent one of the constituencies of the Cape where Xhosa voters formed a significant percentage of the electorate, such as Victoria East. However Jabavu declined, citing the possibility that such a move would unite and aggravate reactionary elements in the Cape Parliament and would therefore be counterproductive. Nonetheless, he later lent his powerful support to the more liberal leaders of the Cape's South African Party against the repressive policies of Rhodes's "Progressives"

In 1884, Tengo Jabavu founded his own newspaper, Imvo Zabantsundu ("Black Opinion"); a year later, he married Elda Sakuba, who would die in 1900, leaving four sons. The eldest of these sons, Davidson Don Tengo Jabavu, would become a respected author and activist in his own right; the second eldest, Alexander, succeeded John Tengo Jabavu as editor of Imvo Zabantsundu, following his 1921 death in the home of D. D. T. Jabavu at Fort Hare.

In the 1890s, Tengo Jabavu's movement Imbumba ("The Union") faced a growing rival, the South African Native National Congress (SANNC) led by Walter Rubusana. While it aspired to unity, Jabavu's movement was still perceived as Xhosa-only party, dominated by Xhosas like Jabavu himself. By contrast, Rubusana's movement was perceived as inter-tribal, with Xhosas and other Africans. Rivalry was exacerbated by national tensions, but largely came to an end as some degree of unity was achieved under the larger African National Congress (ANC), intended finally to lay to rest "the aberrations of the Xhosa Nationalist-African Nationalist feud."

John Tengo Jabavu died on 10 September 1921. In 2006 the South African government awarded him the Order of Luthuli. The award recognized his work in journalism and his support of democracy.

== Sources ==
- McCracken, J. L. (1967). The Cape parliament, 1854-1910. Clarendon.
- Plaut, Martin (2016). Promise and Despair: The First Struggle for a Non-racial South Africa. Jacana. ISBN 978-1-4314-2395-8.
- Walshe, A. P. (2008). "The Origins of African Political Consciousness in South Africa". The Journal of Modern African Studies. 7 (4): 583–610. doi:10.1017/S0022278X00018851. ISSN 0022-278X. S2CID 154967639.
