= Mhudi =

1930 novel by Sol Plaatje

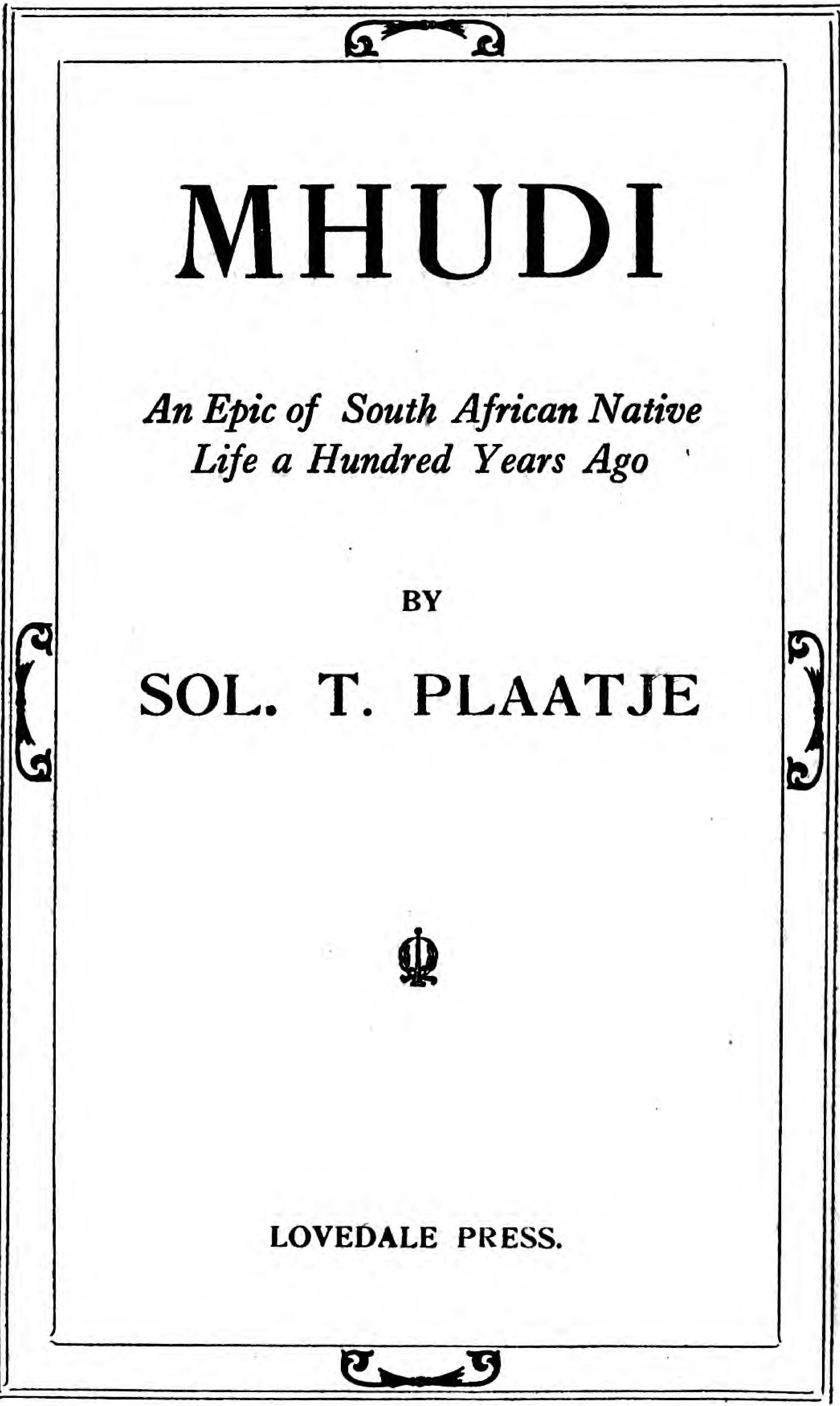
- First edition title page
- Author: Sol Plaatje
- Language: English
- Published: 1930 (Lovedale Press)
- Publication place: South Africa
- Media type: Print

Mhudi: An Epic of South African Native Life a Hundred Years Ago is a South African novel by Sol Plaatje, first published in 1930. The novel has been republished many times, including in the influential Heinemann African Writers Series.

The novel is a political historical novel which explores the development of the Traansval kingdom, led by Matabeleland. The novel was originally finished in 1920, but Plaatje was unable to get the novel published. The novel re-envisions the standard Eurocentric narrative of history, which supported Apartheid and its racist infrastructure.

Plaatje described the novel as a romance, comparing it to the Zulu novels of H. Rider Haggard.

== See also ==
- Guanya Pau: A Story of an African Princess, an 1891 Liberian English-language novel
