= Monckton Commission =

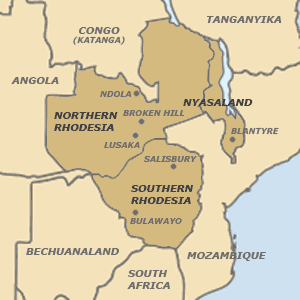
The three territories of the Federation of Rhodesia and Nyasaland

The Monckton Commission, officially the Advisory Commission for the Review of the Constitution of the Federation of Rhodesia and Nyasaland, was set up by the British government under the chairmanship of Walter Monckton, 1st Viscount Monckton of Brenchley, in 1960. Its purpose was to investigate and make proposals for the future of the Federation of Rhodesia and Nyasaland (or Central African Federation), made up of Southern Rhodesia, Northern Rhodesia and Nyasaland—respectively equivalent to today's Zimbabwe, Zambia and Malawi.

== Members ==
The Commission had 20 members, appointed as representatives of six different interest groups:

Representing the UK

- Lord Monckton (chairman)
- Donald MacGillivray (vice-chairman)
- Elspeth Huxley
- Daniel Jack
- R. H. W. Shepherd

Representing the Federation

- Hezekiah Habanyama
- Albert Robinson
- Victor Robinson
- Robert Taylor

Representing the Commonwealth

- Donald Creighton
- Frank Menzies

Representing Southern Rhodesia

- Hugh Beadle
- Geoffrey Ellman-Brown
- Simon Segola

Representing Northern Rhodesia

- Woodrow Cross
- Lawrence Katilungu
- Wilfred McCleland

Representing Nyasaland

- Henry Chikuse
- Edward Gondwe
- Gerald Hadlow

== Conclusion of the Report ==
The Commission concluded that the Federation could not be maintained except by force or through massive changes in racial legislation. It advocated a majority of black African members in the Nyasaland and Northern Rhodesian legislatures and giving these territories the option to leave the Federation after five years.

Released in October 1960, the report advocated sweeping changes to be made to the federal structure, including black African majorities in the Nyasaland and Northern Rhodesian legislatures. The Federal Prime Minister Sir Roy Welensky was outraged when the report was published, calling it the "death knell of federation" and rejecting it out of hand. Black nationalist opinion was just as opposed, but on different grounds. All nationalists wanted an end to federation, and independence for the territories as black-majority-ruled states.

The Monckton Commission toured the Federation in February 1960. It had been given limited terms of reference and was boycotted by the opposition Labour Party and the black nationalists in Nyasaland and Northern Rhodesia. As the Commission's composition seemed weighted towards a continuation of the Federation, its report disappointed the British government. The Monckton Commission reported widespread and sincere opposition to the Federation in the two northern territories. It considered Federation could not survive without at least a major devolution of powers to Nyasaland and Northern Rhodesia, giving more voting rights to black Africans and lessening racial discrimination. Most importantly, it also recommended that Britain should retain the right to allow the secession of either northern territory, recognising that black nationalists would not accept even a modified Federation.

The British government broadly accepted Monckton's report, and this signaled a withdrawal of support for the Federation and the acceptance of early majority rule for Nyasaland and Northern Rhodesia. Accordingly, and despite opposition from Sir Robert Armitage, the Governor of Nyasaland, from the Governments of the Federation and of Southern Rhodesia, and from some colleagues in the cabinet, Colonial Secretary Iain Macleod released Hastings Banda from detention on 1 April 1960 and immediately began to negotiate with him on Nyasaland's constitutional future. The state of emergency was lifted on 16 June 1960. The Malawi Congress Party was formed in 1959 as the successor to the banned Nyasaland African Congress, with Banda as leader. Following an overwhelming Malawi Congress Party victory in August 1961 elections, preparations were made for Nyasaland's independence, which was achieved on 6 July 1964 under the name Malawi.

== Conference to review the Federal Constitution ==
The Federation was created under a British Act of Parliament of 1953 which made provision for a conference to be held at some time during the period 1960 to 1962 to review the Federal Constitution. The United Kingdom and Federal Government and the governments of the three constituent territories were to be represented, and any Federal Bill to amend the Constitution required the votes of two-thirds of the members of the Federal Assembly and had also to gain the assent of the United Kingdom parliament before becoming law. If the such proposed amendment were objected to by one or more of the territorial Legislatures, the British government could not override that objection if either House of Parliament resolved to accept it.

Following the report of the Monckton Commission, which suggested an early conference on the Federal Constitution, the Lord Chancellor, Lord Kilmuir stated the British government’s position on the future of the Federation. He accepted that it had no power to intervene in the internal affairs of Southern Rhodesia, but said that Northern Rhodesia and Nyasaland remained the British government’s responsibility. Kilmuir also stated that the Act of Parliament that created the Federation expressly reserved to the British parliament the right to make such provision for the Federation’s future as it saw fit.

It had been agreed between the British and Federal governments in 1957 that a Federal Review Conference on future of Federation of Rhodesia and Nyasaland would be held in 1960, and this began in London, on 5 December 1960. However, the Federal talks were suspended on 16 December 1960 so that talks could be held on constitutional developments in two of the three constituent territories. These continued until February 1961, but did not include Nyasaland, as Hastings Banda, who only attended the conference with extreme reluctance, walked out on 12 December. The talks also failed to produce a workable constitutional solution for Northern Rhodesia; Banda’s success in the Nyasaland elections of August 1961 made it inevitable that Nyasaland at least would leave the Federation.

The conference did little except to make clear the views of Banda for Nyasaland and Kaunda for Northern Rhodesia that Africans in the northern two territories wanted to leave the Federation, and of Joshua Nkomo that the African majority in Southern Rhodesia wanted majority rule.
