= Jane Elizabeth Waterston =

Scottish teacher and doctor in South Africa

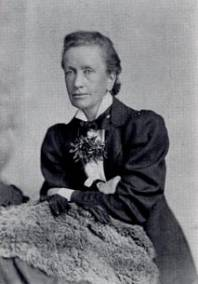
- Born: 1843; Inverness, Scotland
- Died: 7 December 1932 (aged 88–89); Cape Town, South Africa
- Known for: being the first woman physician in Southern Africa

Jane Elizabeth Waterston (1843 – 7 December 1932) was a Scottish teacher and the first woman physician in southern Africa. Inspired by David Livingstone she trained to become a physician and missionary. Prejudice led her to leave the mission in Livingstonia and to work with the poor in South Africa.

== Life ==
Waterston was born in Inverness in 1843. Her father ran the Caledonian Bank in Inverness. She was a Scottish teacher who was given the job of the first Superintendent of a new girl's section at the Lovedale Missionary Institute in South Africa. She arrived in South Africa in January 1867 to work for Dr James Stewart who led the mission. The Lovedale Girls' Institution opened on 23 August 1868. Waterston was the first woman physician in southern Africa.

She worked there until 1873 when she returned to undertake the difficult task of obtaining medical training in England. Waterston was inspired by David Livingstone's death and the news that women were being allowed to become physicians. She was fortunate to be one of the first women to be trained at the London School of Medicine for Women where she took her medical degree in 1880. She received a medical license from the Irish King and Queen's College of Physicians.

After training she went to the Livingstonia Free Church mission which at the time was at Cape Maclear on the shores of Lake Malawi. Lovedale was disillusioned when she saw the poor regard that the missionaries there had for the Africans and for her—the male missionaries accused of her coming to the mission to find a husband. Realising that she was not achieving her potential she left.

In 1880 she was back to the Lovedale mission for three years before she became a physician in Cape Town. She went into private practice, lived in part as a socialite, and was able to send money back to Scotland where her own family were unemployed, following the failure of the Caledonian bank in 1878.

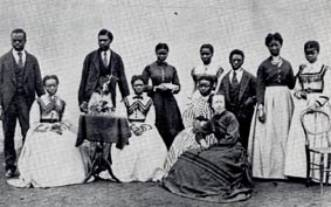
Waterston and her students, date unknown

Waterston worked with the poor and established a "Ladies Branch of the Free Dispensary". It was known as "free expenses", but a small charge was always made to ensure the recipients' dignity. Waterston also insisted that the mothers who benefited should be married even though the child might have been born before the marriage. The organisation looked after mothers and also trained midwives to continue the work.

In Bloemfontein she was part of a six-member committee appointed by the British Minister of War to investigate conditions in the concentration camps (other members of the committee included the suffragist Millicent Fawcett and physician Ella Campbell Scarlett).

For her tireless work, Waterston was given the South African name of Noqataka, "the mother of activity". In 1921 newly arrived missionaries Mamie Martin and her husband visited Waterston on their journey to Malawi. Mani Martin described her as emphatic. In 1925 she became the second woman to be made a fellow of the Royal College of Physicians of Ireland. In 1929 Waterston was made a Doctor of Laws by the University of Cape Town. Waterston died in Cape Town in 1932.

== Legacy ==
Waterston had written to James Stewart who led the institution in Lovedale in 1866. Her correspondence with Stewart continued until 1905. They were edited and published in 1983.
