= Middledrift =

Middledrift Xesi
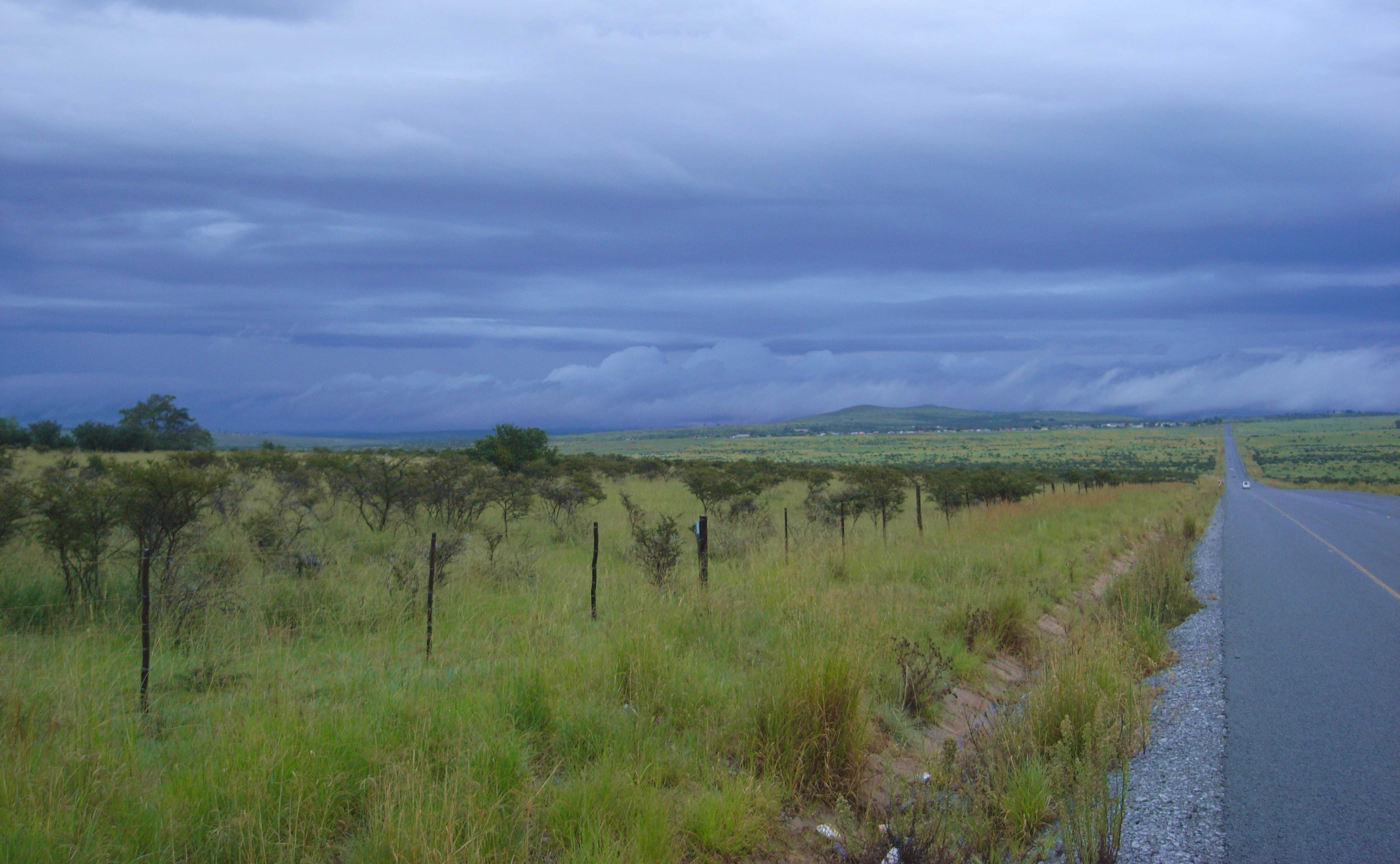
- Landscape near Middledrift

- Location within Eastern Cape Location within South Africa Location within Africa
- Coordinates: 32°49′7″S 26°59′15″E
- Country: South Africa
- Province: Eastern Cape
- District: Amathole
- Municipality: Raymond Mhlaba

Area
  - Total: 1.84 km^{2} (0.71 sq mi)

Population (2011)
  - Total: 2,140
  - Density: 1,160/km^{2} (3,010/sq mi)

Racial makeup (2011)
  - Black African: 95.9%
  - Coloured: 2.1%
  - Indian/Asian: 0.3%
  - White: 0.8%
  - Other: 0.8%

First languages (2011)
  - Xhosa: 86.7%
  - Afrikaans: 5.2%
  - English: 3.8%
  - Sign language: 1.0%
  - Other: 3.3%
- Time zone: UTC+2 (SAST)
- Postal code (street): 5685
- PO box: 5685
- Area code: 046

Middledrift, also known as iXesi, is a small town located 90 kilometres (60 mi) north-west of East London in the Eastern Cape province of South Africa. It is situated in Raymond Mhlaba Municipality in Amathole District in an area that was formerly part of the Ciskei.

The town is on the Keiskamma River, 45 km west-north-west of Qonce and 16 km east-south-east of Alice.

== History ==
It was founded in 1853 and laid out in 1882. At first known as Beaconsfield, it was renamed after its situation at a ford (Dutch: drift) between two others. Due to corruption and mismanagement of funds it has become a wasteland and most of the residents nearby have to travel to Alice for shopping and services. The town is the birthplace of anti-apartheid activist Wilton Mkwayi and advocate Bulelani Ngcuka and author/reporter Noni Jabavu.

== Notable people ==
- Nosimo Balindlela, politician
- Nqabayomzi Kwankwa, politician
- Ayabonga Khaka, national female cricket team player
- Mark Joko, cricket player
- Noni Jabavu, author and journalist
- Bulelani Ngcuka, advocate
- Wilton Mkwayi, anti-apartheid activist
- Nolusindiso Booi, South African rugby union player
- Zintle Mpupha, South African cricketer and rugby union player
