= Mark Joko =

South African cricketer (born 1986)

Personal information
- Born: 25 November 1986 (age 39); Middledrift, South Africa
- Source: Cricinfo, 6 December 2020

Mark Joko (born 25 November 1986) is a South African cricketer. He played in one first-class and two List A matches for Border in 2008 and 2009.

== See also ==
- List of Border representative cricketers
