= Ityala lamawele =

First Xhosa language novel

Ityala Lamawele ("The Lawsuit of the Twins") is the first extant novel in the Xhosa language. It was written by Samuel Edward Krune Mqhayi (1875–1945) and was published by the Lovedale Press in 1914. Since that time, it has been a significant influence on isiXhosa literature.

== Plot ==
The story is set in the time of the historical King Hintsa kaKhawuta (1789–1835), and concerns a dispute between the fictional twins Wele and Babini over their deceased father's estate. As they are born on the same day, their dispute is about to who should take their father's place. This is resolved via a traditional Xhosa legal trial, held at the court of King Hintsa, who presides over the trial. Various people give testimony, key among them Khulile, an inyanga (a wise, old sage) and thus a vital source of oral tradition, and the midwives who helped at the twins' birth. The story also concerns the decreasingly practised tradition of certain tribes of Xhosa people. Ingqithi, or "finger cutting", whereby a child has a finger amputated from the first knuckle. It is reported to cure bed-wetting and prevents the child from becoming mentally disturbed or even injuring themselves by biting their finger. A midwife, Teyase, is able to verify who is the first born by virtue of the cut finger (only one twin had his finger cut, the second born). Khulile notes that the reason the first-born is usually given priority and made his father's successor is that he has more experience than his younger brothers, but that in the case of twins this argument does not really stand. By the end of the trial, both brothers are humbled and each proclaims the seniority of the other.

== Reception ==
The novel is often described as a defence of traditional, precolonial Xhosa law, which was often disparaged by colonial authorities. The literary historian Albert Gerard argues that the book's "real value lies in the magnificent exploitation of the intricacies of the Xhosa language" and the way in which it "validates the cultural values of the Xhosa". Mqhayi certainly lamented the passing away of Xhosa traditions with colonialism, and wrote in the introduction to Ityala lamawele that "Intetho nemikhwa yesiXhosa iya itshona ngokutshona ngenxa yeLizwi nokhanyo olukhoyo, oluze nezizwe zaseNtshonalanga", translated by Abner Nyamende as: "The language and mode of life of the Xhosa people are gradually disappearing because of the Gospel and the new civilization, which came with the nations from the West."

== Editions ==
There have been six different editions of the novel. The first edition (1914) had just nine chapters. The second edition (1915) had 20 chapters and included far more historical information. The edition in print today is an abridged version that has only 16 chapters. According to Jeff Peires, Mqhayi agreed to an abridged edition of his novel being published only if Lovedale Press also kept the enlarged edition, but this was ignored after his death. Today only the abridged edition is in print, and copies of the enlarged edition are very scarce. Despite Mqhayi's great fame in traditional Xhosa culture (Nelson Mandela recalls that hearing him perform was one of the highlights of his youth), his work is not readily available. Something of this has been remedied with the 2010 publication of Abantu Besizwe, an anthology of some of Mqhayi's writings edited by scholar Jeff Opland. Abantu Besizwe also includes translations into English from parts of the abridged version of Ityala lamawele.

It has also been adapted into a TV drama by the SABC.
