= Pallo Jordan =

South African politician

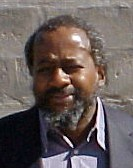
- Jordan in 2005

Minister of Arts and Culture
- In office 2004–2009

Minister of Environmental Affairs and Tourism
- In office 1996–1999
- Preceded by: Dawie de Villiers
- Succeeded by: Valli Moosa

Minister of Communications, Telecommunications and Postal Services.
- In office 1994–1996

Personal details
- Born: Zweledinga Pallo Jordan; 22 May 1942 (age 84) Kroonstad, Free State
- Citizenship: South African
- Party: African National Congress
- Parent(s): Archibald Campbell Jordan; Phyllis Ntantala-Jordan

Zweledinga Pallo Jordan (born 22 May 1942) is a South African politician. He was a member of the National Executive Committee of the African National Congress, and was a cabinet minister from 1994 until 2009.

== Early life ==
Jordan is the son of the academics Archibald Campbell Jordan and Phyllis Ntantala-Jordan. Like his parents, Jordan was active in the Non-European Unity Movement against apartheid. He then joined the ANC and went into exile, studying in Britain and the United States.

== Political career ==
Jordan worked for the ANC in London and in African states. In 1982 he narrowly escaped the detonation of the letter bomb which the apartheid regime had sent to Ruth First and killed her.

In 1985, he was elected to the ANC's National Executive Committee (NEC). He served as administrative secretary of the NEC Secretariat (1985–1988), on the NEC's Strategy and Tactics Committee as convenor (1985–1989), on the NEC's sub-committee on negotiations and the NEC's sub-committee on Constitutional Guidelines and as the Director of Information and Publicity (1989).

Jordan returned to South Africa after the unbanning of the ANC in 1990. Having already participated in the 1987 negotiations in Senegal, he was also a negotiator in the CODESA.

In 1994, he was elected to be a Member of Parliament in the National Assembly for the ANC. He became Minister of Posts, Telecommunications, and Broadcasting (1994–1996) and subsequently Minister of Environmental Affairs and Tourism (1996–1999).

From 1999 to 2004, he served as Chairperson of the Foreign Affairs Committee in the National Assembly. After the 2004 National Elections, Jordan was appointed Minister of Arts and Culture by President Thabo Mbeki, a post he held from April 2004 to May 2009.

In the Eastern Cape Province town of Lady Grey, a school was named after Jordan, called the "Dr Pallo Jordan Primary School".

=== 2009 scandal ===
According to his official biographies, he studied at the University of Wisconsin–Madison in the United States and at the London School of Economics (LSE), but a newspaper investigation revealed that he did not complete his degree at Wisconsin–Madison. On 11 August 2014, ANC secretary general Gwede Mantashe announced that Jordan had resigned from Parliament and apologised to the ruling party after reports that his qualifications were false. The ANC statement also revealed that Jordan had resigned from the National Executive Committee (NEC) of the ANC and from the ANC. At the same time, Jordan was fired from his position as a Business Day columnist because he failed to submit his weekly column for the publication. The ANC's Chief Whip in Parliament Stone Sizani said that with or without academic qualifications Jordan remains a source of pride for the party.

Political offices
Preceded by Welgemoed, P.J.	Minister of Communications, Telecommunications and Postal Services. 1994-1996	Succeeded by Jay Naidoo
Preceded by Dawie de Villiers	Minister of Environmental Affairs and Tourism; 1996-1999	Succeeded by Valli Moosa
Preceded by Ben Ngubane as Minister of Arts, Culture, Science and Technology	Minister of Arts and Culture; 29 April 2004–10 May 2009	Succeeded by Lulama Xingwana
