= Davidson Don Tengo Jabavu =

South African educationist and politician (1885–1959)

D. D. T. Jabavu
- Jabavu in 1914
- Born: Davidson Don Tengo Jabavu; 20 October 1885; King Williams Town, Cape Colony
- Died: 3 August 1959 (aged 73); Fort Hare, South Africa
- Education: University of London (BA)
- Occupations: Academic; writer; politician
- Children: Noni Jabavu
- Parent(s): John Tengo Jabavu and Elda Sakuba

Davidson Don Tengo Jabavu (20 October 1885 – 3 August 1959) was a Xhosa educationist and politician, and a founder of the All African Convention (AAC), which sought to unite all non-European opposition to the segregationist measure of the South African government. He was the eldest son of political activist and pioneering newspaper editor John Tengo Jabavu, and the father of Noni Jabavu, one of the first African female writers and journalists.

== Biography ==
Davidson Don Tengo Jabavu was born in King Williams Town, in the Eastern Cape, South Africa, and was educated at Morija Institution, a mission centre in Basutoland (present-day Lesotho). He later studied at Lovedale in the Cape Province before going to the United Kingdom, where he completed his matriculation at Colwyn Bay in Wales. In 1906 he entered the University of London, earning a BA degree in English six years later. As a student he attended the 1911 Universal Races Congress held in London, where he met leading African Americans and Africans, including his father, who was a member of the South African delegation.

Before returning home in 1915, D. D. T. Jabavu visited the United States on a tour of Booker T. Washington's Tuskegee Institute and other black centres of learning. Back in South Africa, he was a founding member of the staff of the University of Fort Hare in 1916, and the first and only African academic at the institution, where he remained as professor of African languages until 1944.

In addition, he established the South African Native Farmers' Association to encourage the development of better farming standards, stressing the value of manual labour. He also founded the Cape African Teachers' Association and the South African Native Teachers' Federation, which he led for many years. He was also president of the Cape Native Votes' Convention, which campaigned in the 1920 and 1930 for the retention of Africans' voting rights.

In 1936, he was elected first president of the All African Convention (AAC), which sought to consolidate all non-European opposition to the proposed abolition of the African vote; the AAC's stance was subsequently construed as damaging by some radical elements in the African National Congress (ANC). However, in 1948, the year that Jabavu retired from public life, he was a signatory to a joint ANC-AAC "Call for Unity", which attempted to reconcile their differences. The move was not successful, and Jabavu retired from its presidency.

In later years, he ran a private insurance business. He also wrote articles and books on the African struggle, including The Black Problem (1920), The Segregation Fallacy and Other Papers (1928), The Life of John Tengo Jabavu, editor of Imvo Zabantsundu (1922) and IziDungulwana (1958).

In recognition of his contribution towards the creation of a just South African society, in 1953 Jabavu was awarded an honorary doctorate by Rhodes University. He died six years later in 1959, aged 73.
