= Donald MacGillivray =

Scottish colonial administrator (1906–1966)

His Excellency Sir Donald MacGillivray GCMG MBE
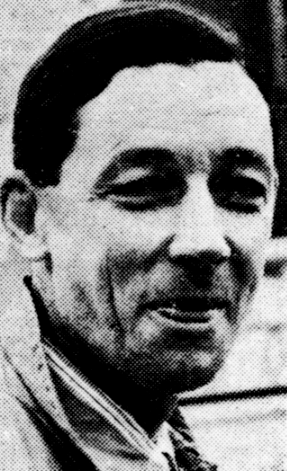
- MacGillivray in 1954

British High Commissioner in Malaya
- In office 31 May 1954 – 31 August 1957
- Monarch: Elizabeth II
- Preceded by: Gerald Templer
- Succeeded by: Position abolished

Personal details
- Born: Donald Charles MacGillivray; 22 September 1906 Canongate, Edinburgh, Scotland
- Died: 24 December 1966 (aged 60) Nairobi, Kenya
- Spouse: Louisa May Knox-Browne
- Education: Trinity College, Oxford (BA, MA)

Sir Donald Charles MacGillivray GCMG MBE (22 September 1906 – 24 December 1966) was a Scottish colonial administrator who served as the last British high commissioner in Malaya.

== Early life and education ==
MacGillivray was born in 1906, the son of Edinburgh barrister Evan James MacGillivray, QC and Maud Hamilton Turcan. He was educated at Sherborne School and Trinity College, Oxford. He earned a B.A. in 1928. He was selected for the Colonial Administrative Service in 1929 and was posted to Tanganyika. He earned his M.A. from Trinity College in 1932.

In 1936, he married Louisa May Knox-Browne. They had one son.

== Career ==
In 1938, the Colonial Office posted MacGillivray to British Palestine, "in accordance with the Colonial Office policy of staffing that difficult territory with some of its best administrators." He served as colonial secretary in Jamaica from 1947 to 1952, and was considered in line for a governorship, briefly serving a stint as acting governor in 1948. However, Oliver Lyttelton, 1st Viscount Chandos selected MacGillivray to serve as deputy high commissioner to General Sir Gerald Templer British High Commissioner in Malaya, where a state of emergency existed.

MacGillivray was the only colonial administrator who openly discussed Malaya's independence with the Malays. He served Malaya from 1954 until 1957. After celebrating Malaya's independence (Hari Merdeka), MacGillivray was accompanied by the Yang Di-Pertuan Agong of Malaya and his consort, together with Malaya's first prime minister, Tunku Abdul Rahman to board the plane in Sungai Besi Airport. MacGillivray also served as the Chairman of the State Council of British Colony of Kenya, which then had five European and six Non-European members. This was almost similar with what he chaired during his administration in British Malaya, where a Legislative Council for the Federation of Malaya was formed, with appointed local and European council members. On 5 August 1957, he signed the Federation of Malaya Agreement, 1957.

In 1960, he was appointed to the Monckton Commission to review the constitution of the Central African Federation.

He died on 24 December 1966 at Nairobi Hospital, after a long illness.

== Honours ==
- United Kingdom:
  - Member of the Order of the British Empire (MBE) (1937)
  - Companion of the Order of St Michael and St George (CMG) (1949)
  - Knight Commander of the Order of St Michael and St George (KCMG) – Sir (1953)
  - Knight Grand Cross of the Order of St Michael and St George (GCMG) – Sir (1957)

Government offices
Preceded by Sir Gerald Templer	British High Commissioner in Malaya; 1954–1957	Succeeded by Position abolished
