= William Wellington Gqoba =

South African Xhosa poet, translator, and journalist

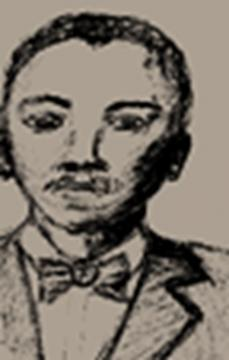
William Wellington Gqoba

William Wellington Gqoba (August 1840 – 26 April 1888) was a Xhosa poet, translator, and journalist. He was a major nineteenth-century Xhosa writer, whose relatively short life saw him working as a wagonmaker, a clerk, a teacher, a translator of Xhosa and English, and a pastor.

Gqoba was born in Gaba, near Alice, Eastern Cape. His father was Gqoba of the Cirha clan, and his grandfather, Peyi, had been a disciple and close associate of Ntsikana, who had played a key role in Xhosa literature, as well as in the Xhosa's conversion to Christianity.

Gqoba attended the Mission School at Tyhume, followed by the Lovedale Institute. In May 1856 he was indentured as a wagonmaker, working in Lovedale, then in King William's Town for a year, and finally at Brownlee Station. In 1858 he was installed as an elder in Tiyo Soga's mission church at Mgwali.

From 1884 until his death in 1888 he was the editor of Isigidimi samaXhosa (The Xhosa Messenger), in which he also published his own articles on the history of the Xhosa people.

His fame, however, was a result of his poetry — in particular two long poems ("The Discussion between the Christian and the Pagan" and "The Great Discussion on Education") whose style was influenced by John Bunyan's The Pilgrim's Progress in Tiyo Soga's Xhosa translation. In both poems, Gqoba presents arguments between the Christian and other points of view, in which he has the Christian argument winning the day.

Gqoba died at Lovedale, near Alice.
