= Bulelani Ngcuka =

South African attorney, prosecutor and activist

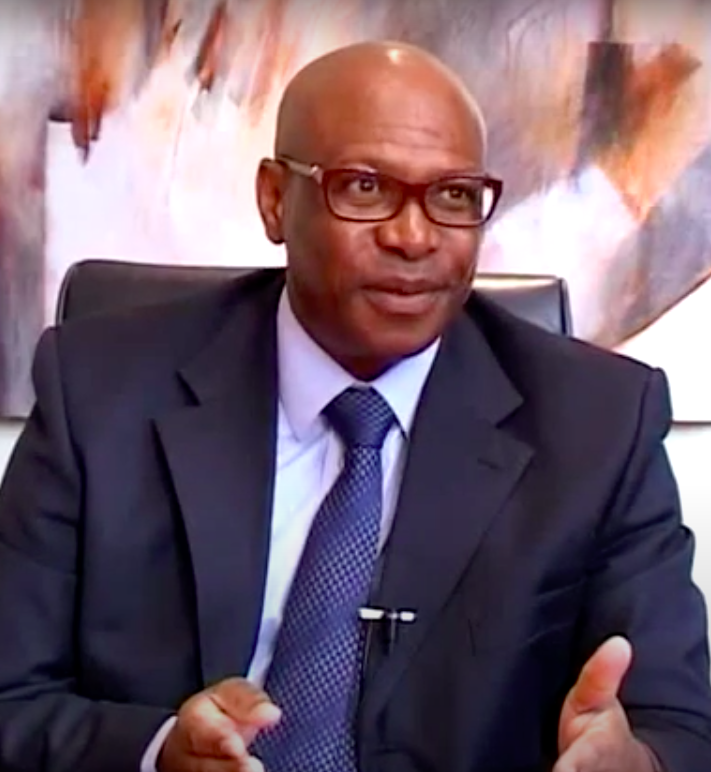

Director of National Prosecuting Authority
- In office August 1998 – July 2004
- President: Nelson Mandela; Thabo Mbeki
- Preceded by: Position established
- Succeeded by: Vusi Pikoli

Personal details
- Born: Bulelani Thandabantu Ngcuka; 2 May 1954 (age 72) Middledrift, Eastern Cape, South Africa
- Citizenship: South Africa
- Party: African National Congress
- Spouse: Phumzile Mlambo-Ngcuka
- Children: 5
- Education: University of Fort Hare; University of South Africa
- Occupation: Attorney; prosecutor; activist
- Profession: Lawyer

Bulelani T. Ngcuka (pronounced [ɓulelaːni ŋǀʱuːkʼa]; born 2 May 1954) is a South African attorney, prosecutor and activist, who served as the first Director of Public Prosecutions in South Africa, and is the husband of former Deputy President of South Africa Phumzile Mlambo-Ngcuka.

== Early life and legal career ==
Bulelani Ngcuka, one of five siblings, was born in Middledrift, Eastern Cape and schooled in the former Bantustan of Transkei. He obtained his B.Proc at the University of Fort Hare in 1977 and went to work for the Durban law firm of Griffiths Mxenge as an articled clerk in 1978. He finished his articles at GM Mxenge Law Firm in 1981, the same year Mxenge was assassinated by apartheid hit men. He spent eight months in solitary confinement in 1981 and was jailed for three years in 1982 for refusing to give evidence in the political trial of Patrick Maqubele and others. While in prison, he completed his LLB through University of South Africa (Unisa).

When Ngcuka was released in 1985, he left for Switzerland and worked at the equality of human rights branch of International Labour Organization in Geneva for two years. It was here that he married Phumzile Mlambo. They have a son, Luyolo. They also have four adopted children.

On his return to South Africa, Ngcuka joined N.J Yekiso & Associates Law Firm in Cape Town. He set up his own firm, Partner Ngcuka & Martana Law Firm in 1989 but became increasingly involved in politics. He also helped set up the National Association of Democratic Lawyers, an alternative legal association to the established white law societies. From 1990 to 1994, he worked as a researcher at the Community Law Centre of the University of the Western Cape.

== Political career ==
In 1987, Ngcuka became active in the United Democratic Front in the Western Cape and later became chairperson. He was again detained for organising the Nelson Mandela birthday in 1988. The same year, he was elected onto the panel of the Independent Mediation Service of South Africa. Ngcuka was also member of the African National Congress (ANC)'s delegation to Codesa in 1991 and to the multi-party negotiations in Kempton Park from 1992 to 1993. Ngcuka was the leader of the ANC Preparatory Delegation to parliament from 1993 to 1994. In 1994, Ngcuka became a senator. From 1994 to 1997, he was the AN'Cs Chief Whip in the Senate and in February 1997, he was elected permanent Deputy Chair of the National Council of Provinces and was largely responsible for implementing the provisions of the Constitution relating to the council. He was chairperson of Joint committee on Human Rights Commission and member of the following committees: Joint Committee on Public Protector, Steering Committee on Public Protector, Steering committee on implementation of the new constitution, Senate rules committee, Senate select committee on Justice, and the Judicial Services Commission. On 16 July 1998, he was elected as the first National Director of Public Prosecutions (NDPP), the head of the National Prosecuting Authority, and by 1999 was an affiliate member of the International Association of Prosecutors. He resigned as NDPP in 2004.

His wife, Phumzile Mlambo-Ngcuka, became the Minister of Mineral and Energy Affairs in Thabo Mbeki's cabinet, and later Deputy President of South Africa.

== Honors and awards ==
- Ngcuka was voted 89th in the Top 100 Great South Africans in 2004.
- Master of Arts in International Relations - Webster University
