= Mount Glory =

Mountain in Wyoming, United States

- Location within Wyoming Location within the United States

Highest point
- Elevation: 10,037 ft (3,059 m)
- Prominence: 1,100 ft (340 m)
- Coordinates: 43°30′25″N 110°57′00″W

Geography
- Location: Caribou-Targhee National Forest, Teton County, Wyoming, U.S.
- Parent range: Teton Range
- Topo map: USGS Rendezvous Peak

Climbing
- Easiest route: Scramble

Mount Glory (10,037 feet (3,059 m) is located in the Teton Range, Caribou-Targhee National Forest, in the U.S. state of Wyoming. The peak is situated just north of Teton Pass.
