= Robert K. Herbert =

American linguist

Robert Kevin Herbert was an American linguist. He was a phonologist and sociolinguist, specializing in the field of African languages.

== Career ==
He taught at the State University of New York (SUNY), Binghamton, for 22 years. He was chair of the Anthropology Department from 1996 to 2001. For some years in the 1990s, Herbert was professor and head of the Department of African Languages at the University of the Witwatersrand, in Johannesburg, South Africa. He taught at a number of other universities, including Stephen F. Austin State University.

He famously organized the linguistics conference, "Sociolinguistics in Africa", in January/February 1990, at the University of the Witwatersrand, during which conference the African National Congress was unbanned.

His academic work extended to an important hypothesis on the genesis and transmission of "isihlonipho sabafazi", that is, the complex system of linguistic avoidance traditionally acquired by married Xhosa women (also called the Xhosa women's "language of respect").

In 2005, Herbert became the provost of Youngstown State University as well as a vice president for academic affairs.

== Death ==
In 2007, Herbert drowned while on vacation in Costa Rica.

== Selected works ==
- Herbert, Robert K. (1990). "Hlonipha and the Ambiguous Woman". Anthropos. 85 (4/6): 455–473. ISSN 0257-9774.
