= Peelton =

- Location within Eastern Cape Location within South Africa
- Coordinates: 32.780°S 27.499°E
- Country: South Africa
- Province: Eastern Cape
- Municipality: Buffalo City
- Time zone: UTC+2 (SAST)
- PO box: 5605

Peelton is a village 60 km north-west of East London and 16 km north-east of King William's Town. It was founded in 1848-49 as a station of the London Missionary Society. Named after Sir Robert Peel, former Prime Minister of Britain and First Lord of the Treasury in 1834; it takes its name from the Valley of Peel.
