= Lovedale Press =

South African publishing company

Lovedale Press is a small South African publishing company that has its origins in 1823 at the Gwali (Tyhume) Mission, located in Tyhume valley in Alice (now eDikeni) in the Eastern Cape. John Bennie, (a brilliant linguist) from the Glasgow Mission Society (GMS) joined John Ross in 1823, and brought with him the Ruthven Printing Press and printed the first Xhosa words in December 1823. The church used the press to publish works that mirrored Scottish missionary values, and develop potential through education and evangelism.

== History ==
Bennie and Ross set up another mission station on the Ncera River in November 1824. This would become eventually become the Lovedale Mission. The original press was destroyed during The Frontier War (1834-5). A replacement press was set up in 1839.

In 1841, the Lovedale Missionary Institute (a seminary) was opened. The press was again destroyed during the War of the Axe (1846-7). The current Lovedale Press dates from 1861. When the Institution opened up a department and took on the task of printing isiXhosa texts.

Initially Lovedale Press focussed on providing books and pamphlets for educational and evangelical purposes. Bennie’s first published work in isiXhosa entitled: “Zonke Inkomo zezi ka-Tixo” (All cattle come from God). Initially vernacular literature publishing was limited to the Christian faith and the bible and hymnbooks were translated into vernacular languages. Later the printing press would become a pioneer printer of African literature, carrying "history and heritage" within it.

== Victory of the Word ==
Co-founded in 2020 by visual and performance artist Athi-Patra Ruga and curator, interdisciplinary art practitioner/gallerist Anelisa Mangcu, Victory of the Word (VOW), is an organisation that works with Lovedale Press and its Trustees to reclaim, preserve and reimagine its legacy through art, research, publishing and education. This "three-phase fundraising and development project" is dedicated to draw public attention to the crisis and to relieving the financial pressures that the Lovedale Press Trustees face, by covering the costs that enable it to keep its doors open, making it accessible to cultural practitioners. Historian Sibusiso Mnyanda's role as Head of Curatorial Research at VOW, is engaged in systematically redesigning how we understand knowledge economies that rose and continue to sprout form this rich epistemological legacy of the reduction of African languages orality to the western form of the written script.

== Notable publications and authors ==
Lovedale Press has an enormous Xhosa printing and publishing heritage. Isigidimi Sama-Xosa (The Xhosa Messenger) was one of the first isiXhosa language newspapers which was printed from 1870 to 1875 by Lovedale Press.

- U-Samson by S.E.K. Mqhayi, who adapted the biblical story of Samson and used the narrative to narrate the realities facing black South Africans whilst avoiding censorship, was published by Lovedale Press in 1907
- Letitia Kakaza wrote Intyatyambo yomzi in 1913
- Vi Swartbooi's novel, UMandisa, was published in 1934.
- Ityala lamawele (The Lawsuit of the Twins) by S. E. K. Mqhayi is the first extant novel in the Xhosa language and was published in 1914 by Lovedale Press.
- Mhudi, a novel by Sol Plaatje, was published by Lovedale Press in 1930
- Ingqumbo Yeminyanya (The wrath of the ancestors) by A C Jordan published in 1940 by Lovedale Press, translated into English in 1980 and then turned into a TV series

This press assisted with the formation of a non traditional elite, and intellectualised isiXhosa as a scientific, research, and justice language.

== Printing and Publishing ==
Vernacular literature came from missionary presses and their Christian perspectives Up until the late 1920s, Lovedale Press consisted of four separate departments. Newly appointed R.H.W. Shepherd bundled these units into a single powerful organization, that would dominate vernacular language publishing. He advocated for author training, mobile libraries and a publishing monopoly, to improve efficiency and could also pay Lovedale workmen wages below stipulated trade union rates. He also signed an agreement with the First Secretary General of the ANC to publish Mhudi in English. Plaatjie had been searching for a publisher for years.

== Current status ==
In 1999/2000 the Presbyterian Church of Southern Africa sold the Lovedale Press to its former employees upon its exit in the publishing and printing enterprise, opening the door for the Lovedale Press Trust to be formed to safeguard and carry on the legacy of lifting up the torch of African languages' intellectualization. The Trust is currently led by Mr Cebo Ntaka and Mrs Lungiswa Mbatyoti. In 2023, the Pan South African Language Board (PanSALB) commemorated the 200th anniversary of the written form of isiXhosa and acknowledged Lovedale Press’ historical significance and the contribution made towards the advancement indigenous canonical writing. However, the recognition was not enough to address the financial crisis and bankruptcy experienced by Lovedale Press. The Lovedale Press Trustees have consulted with the Thabo Mbeki Foundation, Fort Hare Foundation, Pan South African Language Board (PanSALB), University of Fort Hare, Nelson Mandela University, Rhodes University, National Heritage Council of South Africa, National Library of South Africa, South African Library for the Blind, Provincial Department of Sports, Recreation, Arts and Culture (DSRAC) and the Eastern Cape Provincial Heritage Resource Authority (ECPHRA) to enact a recovery plan and re-imagine this historical press as the "pre-eminent publishing and printing organization in Africa”.
