= James Stewart (missionary) =

Scottish missionary

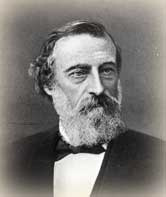
- Born: 14 February 1831; Edinburgh, Scotland
- Died: 21 December 1905 (aged 74); Lovedale, South Africa
- Education: Royal High School, Perth Academy, University of Glasgow
- Scientific career
- Fields: Medicine, education, theology

Signature
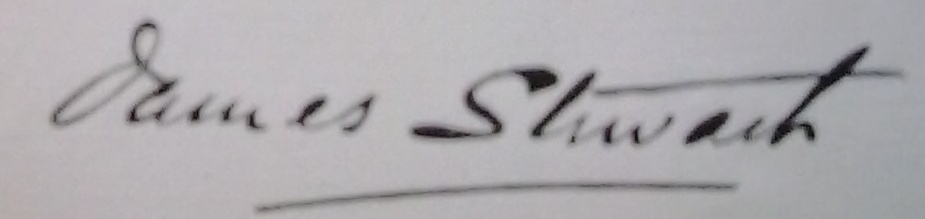

James Stewart (14 February 1831 – 21 December 1905) was a physician, and a medical missionary. He was also a highly skilled botanist and linguist. Many people view him as a pioneer in medical missions for his founding of the hospital in Lovedale, starting a medical school, and developing the founding scheme of the South African Native College, now the University of Fort Hare.

He was Moderator of the General Assembly of the Free Church of Scotland 1899/1900 and oversaw the Union of 1900.

== Early life ==
He was born in Edinburgh, Scotland on 14 February 1831. He was educated at the Royal High School, Edinburgh. After his father remarried the family moved to a farm near Scone and James finished his education at Perth Academy. At the age of 15 he decided that he wanted to be a missionary. He studied at Edinburgh University and St Andrews University then trained as a Free Church minister at New College, Edinburgh. The church considered him suitable as a medical missionary and sent him to Glasgow University to train as a physician. In 1865 he graduated M.B. and C.M. and graduated with distinctions in surgery, material medical, and forensic medicine. He became a missionary in February 1865 for the Free Church of Scotland, sanctioned by the Free Presbytery of Glasgow. Stewart was described by some as "more as a friend than as a doctor" towards his patients.

Stewart grew up with both his mother and father, but his mother died while he was a teenager and his father remarried. His mother was part of the Dudgeon sept of the Noresmen. His mother was thought to be a major influence in Stewart’s life from whom he received his love and appreciation for beauty. He was a cab proprietor and later ran a farm called Pictstonhill near Scone in Perthshire. At the Disruption of 1843 his father allowed the newly created Free Church to preach in his barn while they awaited their church being built. He was a very religious man and influenced Stewart towards missionary work. Stewart had a desire from a young age to go to Africa. He told his cousin, "I shall never be satisfied till I am in Africa with a Bible in my pocket, and a rifle on my shoulder to supply my wants."

== Journey to Africa ==
“The real African is not the thoughtless, laughter-loving, untrainable savage, or typical Quashee of works of fiction, or the 'half child' that so many, even of the present day, take him to be. Nor is he the wholly docile, teachable, and plastic creature of whom anything can be made when looked at with purely philanthropic eyes. In reality, he is quite a different sort of bein, stronger and more difficult to shape, though lighthearted and good-humored generally”

— James Stewart

On 13 August 1861, James Stewart traveled to Cape Town with Livingstone's wife. On his first journey there, he became ill with a fever. When he arrived in Africa he teamed up with David Livingstone, a Scottish missionary who was a national hero in Britain for his medical work. Stewart soon returned to Europe to complete his education, then returned to Lovedale in South Africa in 1867 after marrying his wife, Mina Stephen.

=== Views on Africa ===
Stewart thought that Africa was lagging behind other nations. When he first traveled in Africa, he observed that magic and medicine were intertwined, which he felt made African medicine inferior to European medicine. He felt that medicine in Africa had a very large presence, but he also felt that it had many malignant effects. He learned some of the natives’ medicine, but thought that European medicine should take precedence over native medicine.

He also had many negative views about the African natives. He felt there were no moral forces present in the African natives' lives. He warned people who went there of "descent into mere animalism and fixed and hopeless barbarism," showing how he viewed the lives of the Africans as inferior to his life. He was also worried about their moral degradation because of polygamy and witchcraft. Stewart thought that this degradation process was reversible through mission help. He aimed at fixing their decline through his missionary work in Africa. Stewart also implicitly suggested that Africans were racially inferior to Europeans, both physically and biologically. Even though at first James Stewart had many negative views on Africans, he did not treat them as inferiors and did everything he could to help them.

=== Lovedale ===
In 1864 Stewart was selected by the Free Church of Scotland to work at Lovedale, which was a mission and a school 700 miles north-east of Cape Town and 80 miles away from the Indian Ocean. He took charge in 1866 and was asked to be principal in 1867. Jane Elizabeth Waterston was employed to create an institution for girls. Lovedale was supported financially by the Free Church of Scotland. At the time Stewart arrived Lovedale had a staff of more than twenty-four Europeans. Stewart became the principal of Lovedale in 1867 and maintained this position for 40 years; as a result, he was given the name Stewart of Lovedale. He made Lovedale the best school in Africa by adopting the school to the natives’ needs. For example, instead of teaching them Latin and Greek, he taught them English, which was a much more useful language for them. Stewart also had many different goals for Lovedale which he described in his book Dawn in the Dark Continent:

1. To take young men of intellectual and spiritual qualifications and train them to be preachers.
2. To train young men and women as teachers for native mission schools.
3. To give education in various industrial arts, such as carpentering, waggon-making, blacksmithing, printing, bookbinding, telegraphy, and agricultural work of various kinds, to natives, that they may become industrious and useful citizens."
4. To give a general education of an elementary kind to all whose course in life has not been definitely determined"

Through these goals Stewart aimed at providing a complete education, which also prepared the students for the workforce. During Stewart's time at Lovedale, he also erected a small hospital.

Stewart became Principal of Lovedale in 1870.

=== Livingstonia ===
In 1875, the Free Church of Scotland founded Livingstonia in honor of the well-known Scottish doctor, David Livingstone and asked Stewart to run it. They did this because he wanted to continue the work of Dr. Livingstone. He wanted Livingstonia to be on the shores of Lake Malawi, and received financial backing from a group of Glasgow businessmen. He wanted it independent from the Free Church Foreign Mission authorities. The mission was located at the south end of the lake at Cape Maclear and opened in October 1875. The mission focused on improving (or providing) housing and diet (or food) as a way to promote health. Livingstonia became the most important mission in the region, until the First World War.

He was replaced by Rev Dr Robert Laws.

== Medical mission work ==
During Stewart’s time in Africa he learned a lot of valuable information about Africa and the natives' ways, for example, information about the medical properties of different plants. He also observed many medicine men. Stewart decided that the best way to treat Africans was by combining Western medicine with their own practices, such as those of the medicine men. None of the missionaries who preceded James Stewart in South Africa, such as Dr. Venderkemp and Dr. Livingtsone, had focused on the medical aspect of missionary work. Stewart, however, felt that it was equally important.

While Stewart was working in South Africa he was one of only five legal medical missionaries there. Stewart was the first of them to found a hospital in South Africa. He also instructed native nurses and hospital assistants and laid a foundation for a medical school. Stewart also made many house calls. People described Stewart as "the beloved physician in many a home" and that he "gave both ungrudgingly, and no home was too far [for him], no road too difficult, no night too stormy, to hinder the great missionary in his errands of mercy". One person described how one night Stewart was called for because a little boy had been bitten by one of the most dangerous serpents, the puff-adder. Stewart sucked the venom out of every one of the boy’s wounds, risking his own life to save the young boy. This example is very accurate depiction of how much Dr. Stewart cared for his patients.

=== The Hospital at Lovedale ===
Stewart had many goals. Stewart had sole medical charge of all the boys and girls at Lovedale, but he also wanted to create a hospital there. His first attempt did not work, however with the help of the Colonial Government he opened the Victoria hospital. He gained the respect of natives by charging a small amount for the medicine and treatment he gave them. This made them value his care more. The hospital was opened in 1898 and after a few obstacles had an annual attendance of five thousand. Stewart also wanted to create a medical college, and planned to eventually expand the hospital at Lovedale into a medical school. He wanted the people of Ethiopia to have access to a full medical education.

== Later life ==
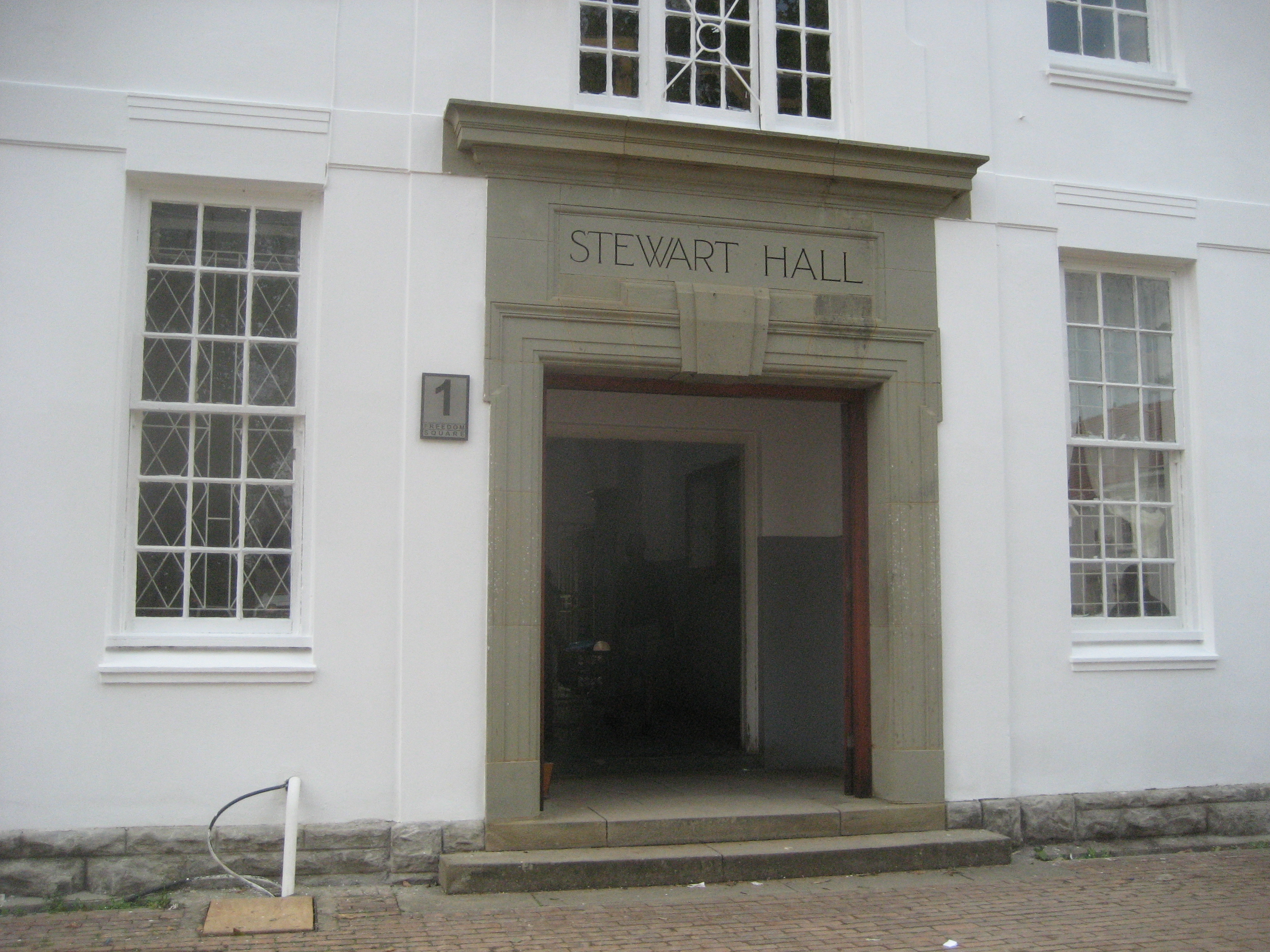
Stewart Hall, University of Fort Hare

In 1899 he succeeded Rev Alexander Whyte as Moderator of the General Assembly, the highest position in the Free Church of Scotland.

During Stewart's later life he made many trips between Africa and Europe. He travelled to Lovedale in 1899, then came back to Scotland in 1900. He again visited Lovedale in 1901, and returned to Edinburgh in 1902. He then visited America in 1903, and went from there to Lovedale in 1904, then went to Cape Town in 1905. Looking back on his experience in Africa, Dr. Stewart realized that "but of all that the African continent contains which the civilized nations prize and want, it still remains true that the most valuable asset in Africa is the African himself. We cannot do without him, and, if he is wise, he will admit that he cannot do without us." Stewart learned to respect the Africans and realized that the natives had as much to offer to him as he had to them.

Stewart died on 21 December 1905, in Lovedale.

== Family ==
In 1866 James Stewart married Williamina ("Mina") Stephen. They had one son and eight daughters.

== Publications ==
- A Synopsis of Structural and Physiological Botany
- Botanical Diagrams
- Lovedale Past and Present (1884)
- Lovedale: Illustrated (1894)
- Lovedale: Its Origin
- Kaffir Phrase Book and Vocabulary
- Outlines of Kaffir Grammar

== Bibliography ==
- Wells, James (1908). Stewart of Lovedale: The Life of James Stewart ... Hodder and Stoughton.
- Hokkanen, Markku (2007). Medicine and Scottish missionaries in the Northern Malawi Region 1875-1930: quests for health in a colonial society. Edwin Mellen Press. ISBN 978-0-7734-5341-8.
- Hunter, Robert (1873). History of the missions of the Free church of Scotland in India and Africa. London; New York: T. Nelson. pp. 370-374.
- Stewart, James (1906). Dawn in the dark continent or Africa and its missions. Edinburgh: Morrison & Gibb.
- Smith, George (April 1906). "James Stewart, MD, DD of Lovedale". The Missionary Review of the World. 16 (4): 290–292.
- Kalinga, Owen J. M. (2012). Historical Dictionary of Malawi. Rowman & Littlefield. ISBN 9780810859616.
