= Lovedale (South Africa) =

Former mission station and educational institute in Cape Province, South Africa

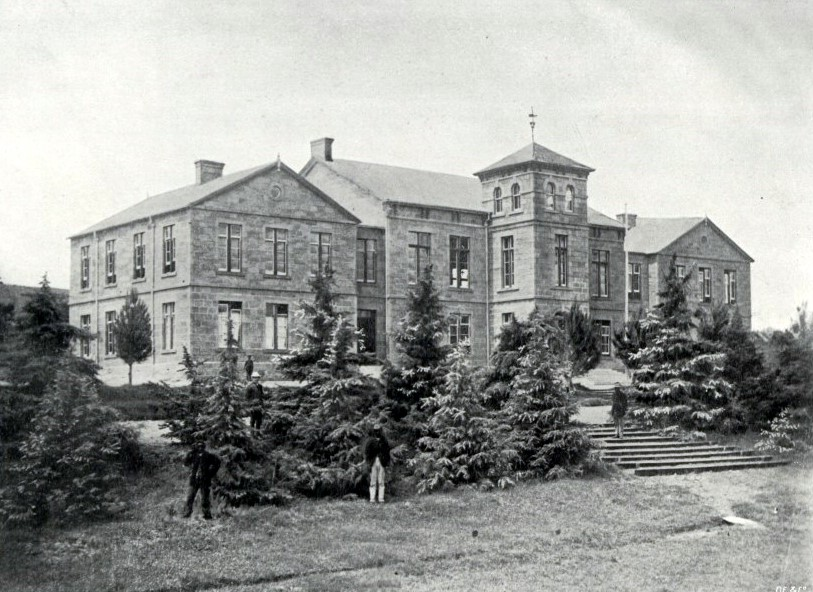
The Lovedale Mission Station

Lovedale, also known as the Lovedale Missionary Institute, was a mission station and educational institute in the Victoria East division of the Cape Province, South Africa (now in Eastern Cape Province). It lies 520 metres (1,720 ft) above sea level on the banks of the Tyhume River, a tributary of the Keiskamma River, some 3.2 kilometres (2 mi) north of Alice.

== Foundation ==
The station was founded in 1824 by the Glasgow Missionary Society (GMS) and was named after Dr John Love, one of the leading members of, and at the time secretary to, the society. The site first chosen was in the Ncera valley, but in 1834 the mission buildings were destroyed during the 6th Frontier War. On rebuilding, the station was removed somewhat farther north to the banks of the Tyhume river. John Bennie was one of the founding fathers of the mission station, which was established among the Xhosas. In 1846 the work at Lovedale was again interrupted, this time by the War of the Axe. On this occasion the buildings were converted into a fort and garrisoned by regular troops. In 1850, the Xhosa government threatened Lovedale and made an attack on the neighbouring Fort Hare, built during the previous war.

Until 1841 the missionaries had devoted themselves almost entirely to evangelistic work; in that year the Lovedale Missionary Institute was founded by William Govan, who, save for brief intervals, continued at its head until 1870. He was then succeeded by Dr. James Stewart (1831–1905), who had joined the mission in 1867, having previously (1861–1863), and partly in company with David Livingstone, explored the Zambezi regions. Jane Elizabeth Waterston, a Scottish doctor and teacher, was given the job of creating a facility for girls at the mission. She arrived in South Africa in January 1867 to work for Dr James Stewart. The Lovedale Girls' Institution opened on 23 August 1868. There had been previous girls' education at the Institute from 1846 to 1856, but this had been closed because of the Xhosa cattle-killing movement and famine.

=== Denomination ===
Until 1837 the mother institution back in Scotland, the GMS, was not attached to any church. The crisis that would lead to the Disruption of 1843 began brewing in the 1830s, and in 1837 the GMS split in two—those who continued to support the Presbyterian Church of Scotland and those who disagreed with the Church's official policy, which allowed the church to appoint a pastor even against the wish of the congregation. Lovedale and some other missions went with the Church of Scotland, but others attached themselves to the Glasgow South African Missionary Society, which was associated with the Relief Church; after the 1843 disruption all of the stations allied with the Church of Scotland, including Lovedale, were transferred to the Free Church of Scotland.

== Native education ==
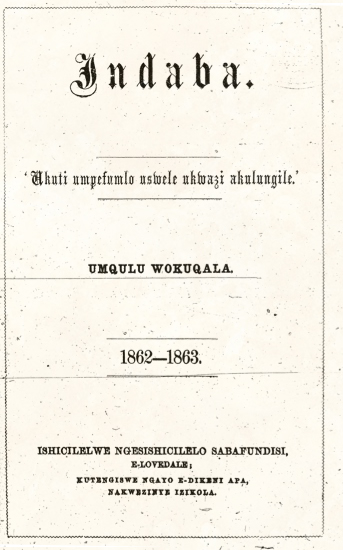
Titlepage of the first volume of the magazine Indaba published at Lovedale, 1862-1863

The institute, in addition to its purely church work — in which no sectarian tests were allowed — provided for the education of Africans of both sexes in nearly all branches of learning (Stewart discontinued the teaching of Greek and Latin, adopting English as the classic); it also took European (white) scholars, no racial distinction being allowed in any department of the work (indeed; until it became part of the new Union of South Africa in 1910, the laws of the Cape Colony were "colour-blind"). The institute gave technical training in many subjects and maintained various industries, including such diverse enterprises as farming and printing works. Eventually it included a primary school, high school, technical school, a teacher training college, a theological college and a hospital.

The school buildings rivalled in accommodation and completeness those of the schools in large British cities. The educational and industrial methods initiated at Lovedale were widely adopted by other missionary bodies.

Lovedale later became a branch of the work of the United Free Church of Scotland, becoming part of the Church of Scotland in 1929 (when the United Free Church united with the Church of Scotland). It was closed in the 1950s under the Bantu Education Act. The last ordained Principal of Lovedale was the Reverend R. H. W. Shepherd, who became Moderator of the General Assembly of the Church of Scotland in 1959.

Missionary control of the college at Lovedale ended in 1955, passing to the state through the Bantu Education Act of 1952. The Lovedale Bible School continued as a separate Christian institution. Lovedale Press, in Alice (Dikeni), continues to publish religious and educational material in several languages.

The Ciskei Government closed the college in 1979 but later re-opened it. The campus at Alice (Raymond Mhlaba Local Municipality) continues today with an emphasis on agriculture.

== Notable alumni ==
- Thabo Mvuyelwa Mbeki
- Walter Rubusana
- Steve Biko
- Chris Hani
- William Wellington Gqoba
- Ellen Kuzwayo
- William Koyi missionary to Malawi
- Z. K. Mathews
- Samuel Edward Krune Mqhayi
- Govan Mbeki
- Gladys Mgudlandlu
- Charles Nqakula
- Sam Nolutshungu
- Enoch Sontonga
- King Sobhuza II
- Kgosi Bathoen II
- Tiyo Soga
- Walter Stanford
- Michael Mosoeu Moerane

== Notable staff ==
- Rev Dr James Stewart
- George McCall Theal
- Milner Langa Kabane, who later became principal
- 'Masechele Caroline Ntseliseng Khaketla
- Rev David Duncan Stormont missionary here from 1891

== Other ==
Lovedale is also the name of a house on the island of Iona in Scotland. It is believed that a previous resident of the house had South African links, which explains the naming of the house in an area where Gaelic house names predominate.

== Notes and references ==
- Waterston, Jane Elizabeth (1983). Lucy Bean (ed.). The Letters of Jane Elizabeth Waterston, 1866-1905. The Van Riebeeck Society. ISBN 9780620073752.
- The Gov'nor Observer Column in: The Financial Times, June 14, 2001
- Stewart, James (1887). Lovedale: Past and Present: A Register of Two Thousand Names. Lovedale Mission Press.
- Stewart, James (1903). Dawn in the Dark Continent, or, Africa and its Missions ... With maps, etc. Oliphant & Company.
- Wells, James (1908). Stewart of Lovedale: The Life of James Stewart ... Hodder and Stoughton.
- Young, Robert (1902). African Wastes Reclaimed. Illustrated in the Story of the Lovedale Mission. With ... Illustrations [including Portraits.].
- Shepherd, Robert Henry Wishart (1940). Lovedale, South Africa: The Story of a Century, 1841-1941. With an introduction by Hon J.H. Hofmeyr ... Lovedale Press.
