= List of Xhosa people =

This is a list of notable Xhosa people.

== Kings ==
- King Maxhoba Sandile, Aa! Zanesizwe! - King of the Rharhabe sub-group of the Xhosa nation in Mngqesha Great Palace, King William's Town.
- King Zwelonke Sigcawu, Aa! Zwelonke! - King of the Xhosa nation in Nqadu Great Palace, Willowvale.
- King Buyelekhaya Dalindyebo, Aa! Zwelibanzi! - King of the abaThembu in Bumbane Great Place, Mthatha.
- King Sabata Dalindyebo, Aa! Jonguhlanga! - King of the abaThembu and father to Buyelekhaya.
- King Zwelenkosi Matanzima, Aa! Zwelenkosi! - King of Western Thembu in Qamata Great Place, Cofimvaba.
- King Ngubengcuka, Aa! Ndaba! - Great King of abaThembu and great-grandfather of Nelson Mandela.

== Princes and Princesses ==
- Zolile Burns-Ncamashe, AmaGwali Prince
- Emma Sandile, AmaRharhabe Princess

== Chiefs ==
- Chief Sipho Mangindi Burns-Ncamashe
- Chief Bhurhu kaKhawuta
- Chief Langa kaPhalo
- Chief Justice Thandathu Jongilizwe Mabandla
- Chief Malashe ka Khawuta
- Chief Mandla Mandela, grandson of Nelson Mandela
- Chief Skelewu Mbeki, grandfather of Thabo Mbeki
- Chief Alphin Mbuso Mqalo
- Chief Falo Mgudlwa
- Chief Ngqeno ka Langa

== Religious leaders ==
- Mvume Dandala
- Njongonkulu Ndungane
- John Knox Bokwe
- James Mata Dwane
- Makhanda
- Enoch Mgijima
- Malusi Mpumlwana
- Peter Mtuze
- Zithulele Patrick Mvemve
- Joe Mzamane
- Mbulelo Mzamane
- Sitembele Mzamane
- Mlibo Ngewu
- Nongqawuse
- Nontetha Nkwenkwe
- Ntsikana
- Ebenezer Ntlali
- Walter Rubusana
- Tiyo Soga
- Desmond Tutu
- Mpho Tutu van Furth
- Nomalizo Leah Tutu

== Academics, scientists and business people ==
- Hlumelo Biko
- Nonkululeko Gobodo
- Mhlobo Jadezweni
- Nomgcobo Jiba
- AC Jordan
- Phyllis Ntantala-Jordan
- Prudence Nobantu Mabele
- Mbuyiseli Madlanga
- Sindiwe Magona
- Vuyokazi Mahlati
- Archie Mafeje
- Cecilia Makiwane (1880–1919)
- Thembekile Kimi Makwetu
- Makaziwe Mandela
- Makgatho Mandela
- Ndaba Mandela
- Ndileka Mandela
- Zenani Mandela
- Zindzi Mandela (1960–2020)
- Evelyn Mase
- Mandisa Maya
- Bongani Mayosi
- Abigail Mbalo-Mokoena, chef and restaurateur
- Thando Mgqolozana
- Nonkosi Mhlantla
- Mandisa Monakali
- Lex Mpati
- Dali Mpofu
- Sizwe Mpofu-Walsh
- Peter Mtuze
- Dumisani Mzamane
- Godfrey Mzamane
- Joab Mzamane
- Mbulelo Mzamane
- Bongani Ndodana-Breen
- Andile Ngcaba
- Tembeka Ngcukaitobi
- Dora Nginza
- Laduma Ngxokolo
- Wiseman Nkuhlu
- Terence Mncedisi Nombembe
- Loyiso Nongxa
- Dumisa Ntsebeza
- Barney Pityana
- Beryl Rose Sisulu
- Mlungisi Sisulu
- Shaka Sisulu
- Thembile Skweyiya
- Mvuyo Tom
- Zukisa Tshiqi
- Siyabulela Xuza

== Military and warriors ==
- Bhurhu kaKhawuta
- Patrick Duze
- Fumanekile Gqiba
- Nomonde Gogi-Gumede
- Hintsa kaKhawuta
- Malashe ka Khawuta
- Maqoma kaNgqika
- Makhanda
- Qaqambile Matanzima
- Themba Matanzima
- Duma Mdutyana
- Derrick Mgwebi
- Bubele Mhlana
- Luvuyo Nobanda
- Butana Almond Nofomela
- Sandile kaNgqika
- Sarili kaHintsa
- Mbombini Molteno Sihele
- Lindile Yam

== Politicians and activists ==
- Ngconde Balfour
- Nosimo Balindlela
- Mike Basopu
- Nqaba Bhanga
- Steve Biko
- Nomandla Bloem
- Mongameli Bobani
- Duma Boko
- Thozamile Botha
- Nomkhitha Boto-Mashinini
- Fort Calata
- James Calata
- Beauty Dambuza
- Nosipho Dastile
- Welcome Duru
- Pumza Dyantyi
- Richard Dyantyi
- Mncedisi Filtane
- Fundile Gade
- Mluleki George
- Sindiswa Gomba
- John Gomomo
- Matthew Goniwe
- Joe Nzingo Gqabi
- Oupa Gqozo
- Siviwe Gwarube
- Alcott Skei Gwentshe
- The Gugulethu Seven
- Chris Hani
- Bantu Holomisa
- Patekile Holomisa
- Davidson Don Tengo Jabavu
- John Tengo Jabavu
- Mac Jack
- Mkhuseli Jack
- Mazibuko Jara
- Irvin Jim
- Mcebisi Jonas
- Pallo Jordan
- Milner Langa Kabane
- Noxolo Kiviet
- Nkosiphendule Kolisile
- Ncumisa Chwayita Kondlo
- Ayanda Kota
- Butana Komphela
- Nqabayomzi Kwankwa
- Lennox Lagu
- Zingiswa Losi
- Andile Lungisa
- Nomfunelo Mabedla
- Phakamile Mabija
- Patrick Mabilo
- Oscar Mabuyane
- Saki Macozoma
- Babalo Madikizela
- Bonginkosi Madikizela
- Winnie Madikizela-Mandela
- Ben Mafani
- Nocawe Mafu
- Vusumzi Make
- Cecilia Makiwane
- Clarence Makwetu
- Richard Majola
- Zollie Malindi
- Nelson Mandela, first president of South Africa
- Winnie Mandela
- Siphokazi Mani-Lusithi
- Gwede Mantashe
- Tozama Mantashe
- Nosiviwe Mapisa-Nqakula
- Thandiswa Marawu
- Phumulo Masualle
- George Matanzima
- Kaiser Matanzima
- Qaqambile Matanzima
- Themba Matanzima
- Mangaliso Matika
- Florence Matomela
- Chumani Maxwele
- Moses Mayekiso
- Fikile Mbalula
- Jabu Mbalula
- Govan Mbeki, father of Thabo Mbeki
- Jama Mbeki
- Linda Mbeki
- Monwabisi Kwanda Mbeki
- Moeletsi Mbeki
- Thabo Mbeki, second president of South Africa
- Baleka Mbete
- Nomafrench Mbombo
- A.P. Mda
- Membathisi Mdladlana
- Nomakhosazana Meth
- Nomaindia Mfeketo
- Z.F. Mgcawu
- Nontsizi Mgqwetho
- Raymond Mhlaba, first premier of the Eastern Cape
- Sicelo Mhlauli
- Clarence Mini
- Vuyisile Mini
- Sparrow Mkhonto
- Wilton Mkwayi
- Masizole Mnqasela
- Mandisa Monakali
- Zolile Monakali
- Nasiphi Moya
- Oscar Mpetha
- Loyiso Mpumlwana
- Ndaba Mtirara
- Alfred Mtsi
- Mlungisi Mvoko
- Griffiths Mxenge
- Victoria Mxenge
- Godfrey Mzamane
- Mbulelo Mzamane
- Mnikelo Ndabankulu
- Stella Ndabeni-Abrahams
- Bicks Ndoni
- Andile Ngcaba
- Bulelani Ngcuka
- Lulama Ngcukaitobi
- Smuts Ngonyama
- Dora Nginza
- Looksmart Khulile Ngudle
- Nomantu Nkomo-Ralehoko
- Gugile Nkwinti
- Duma Nokwe
- Sam Nolutshungu
- Charles Nqakula
- Xolile Nqatha
- Stanley Ntapane
- Thembeni Nxangisa
- Thulas Nxesi
- Alfred Nzo
- Pebco Three
- Zamuxolo Peter
- Sabelo Phama
- Vusi Pikoli
- Barney Pityana
- John Nyathi Pokela
- Mzonke Poni
- Mlibo Qoboshiyane
- Christine Qunta
- Robert Resha
- Walter Rubusana
- Madoda Sambatha
- Charles Sebe
- Lennox Sebe
- Archie Sibeko
- Letitia Sibeko
- Annie Silinga
- Albertina Sisulu
- Walter Sisulu
- Lindiwe Sisulu
- Max Sisulu
- Shaka Sisulu
- Zwelakhe Sisulu
- Stone Sizani
- TD Mweli Skota
- Mcebisi Skwatsha
- Zola Skweyiya
- Robert Sobukwe
- Tiyo Soga
- Mbulelo Sogoni
- Buyelwa Sonjica
- Maggie Sotyu
- Makhenkesi Stofile
- Isaac Bangani Tabata
- Dora Tamana
- Adelaide Tambo
- Dali Tambo
- Oliver Tambo
- Bulelwa Tinto
- Pamela Tshwete
- Steve Tshwete
- Desmond Tutu
- Nomalizo Leah Tutu
- Moses Twebe
- Zwelinzima Vavi
- Zolile Williams
- Fikile Xasa
- Tokozile Xasa
- Lulu Xingwana
- Paul Xiniwe
- Alfred Xuma
- Yoliswa Yako
- Tony Yengeni
- Vuyolwethu Zungula

== Artists and writers ==
- Zwai Bala
- Bala Brothers
- Tshawe Baqwa
- Amanda Black
- Busiswa
- John Knox Bokwe
- Gaba Cannal
- Simphiwe Dana
- Lulu Dikana
- Zonke Dikana
- Welcome Duru
- Johnny Mbizo Dyani
- Nofinishi Dywili
- Emtee
- Ami Faku
- Brenda Fassie
- Dumile Feni
- Mongezi Feza
- William Wellington Gqoba
- Mongezi Gum
- Heavy-K
- Nicholas Hlobo
- iFani
- John Tengo Jabavu
- Noni Jabavu
- Mhlobo Jadezweni
- Milner Langa Kabane
- Ayanda Jiya
- A.C. Jordan
- Atandwa Kani
- John Kani
- Gibson Kente
- Miriam Makeba
- Babalwa M
- Ayanda Mabulu
- Ringo Madlingozi
- Madosini
- Fikile Magadlela
- Sindiwe Magona
- Mzi Mahola
- Zolani Mahola
- Zoleka Mandela
- Billy Mandindi
- Mildred Mangxola
- Nkosinathi Mankayi
- Msaki
- John Matshikiza
- Pumeza Matshikiza
- Todd Matshikiza
- Thandiswa Mazwai
- Jessica Mbangeni
- Margaret M'cingana Singana
- Zakes Mda
- Nontsizi Mgqwetho
- Gladys Mgudlandlu
- Gcina Mhlophe
- Bulelwa Mkutukana
- Anatii Mogweni
- Mpura
- Samuel Edward Krune Mqhayi
- Peter Mtuze
- Godfrey Mzamane
- Mbulelo Mzamane
- Bongani Ndodana-Breen
- Winston Mankunku Ngozi
- Zim Ngqawana
- Vusimuzi Nongxa
- Unathi Nkayi
- Tats Nkonzo
- Trevor Noah
- Nomfusi
- Vusi Nova
- Victor Ntoni
- Siphiwo Ntshebe
- Makaya Ntshoko
- Winston Ntshona
- Mamela Nyamza
- Liema Pantsi
- Nia Pearl
- George Pemba
- R.L. Peteni
- Sol Phenduka
- Dudu Pukwana
- Percy Qoboza
- Walter Rubusana
- Moonchild Sanelly
- Ncedile Saule
- Mbombini Molteno Sihele
- Mkhanyiseli Siwahla
- Something Soweto
- Tiyo Soga
- The Soil
- Enoch Sontonga
- Lundi Tyamara
- Benjamin Tyamzashe
- Andile Yenana
- Zanda Zakuza

== Athletes ==
- Lusapho April
- Lukhanyo Am
- Mbulelo Botile
- Vuyani Bungu
- Lennox Bacela
- Lusanda Badiyana
- Mlungisi Bali (1990–2018)
- Masixole Banda
- Temba Bavuma
- Thembelani Bholi
- Chumani Booi
- Siyabonga Booi
- Siphamandla Dapo
- Tim Dlulane
- Aphiwe Dyantyi
- Mzo Dyantyi
- Thembinkosi Fanteni
- Aphelele Fassi
- Dumile Feni
- Myolisi Fumba
- Ali Funeka
- Ludumo Galada
- Siphelele Gasa
- Lungile Gongqa
- Lungelo Gosa
- Lizo Gqoboka
- Andile Jali
- Sinethemba Jantjie (1989–2019)
- Bhongolwethu Jayiya
- Andile Jho
- Somila Jho
- Anaso Jobodwana
- Nkosinathi Joyi
- Ntando Kebe
- Steve Komphela
- Siya Kolisi
- Lubabalo Kondlo
- Watu Kobese
- Luxolo Koza
- Simphiwe Khonco
- Siphamandla Krweqe
- Cecil Lolo (1988–2015)
- Thembinkosi Lorch
- Sisanda Magala
- Sylvian Mahuza
- Dumisa Makalima
- Masibulele Makepula
- Kaya Malotana
- Luvo Manyonga
- Makazole Mapimpi
- Zolani Marali
- Masonwabe Maseti
- Simphiwe Matanzima
- Pumelela Matshikwe
- Michael Matika
- Siphamandla Mavanda
- Phumza Maweni
- Mark Mayambela
- Mihlali Mayambela
- Athi Mayinje
- Khanyisa Mayo
- Patrick Mayo
- Asavela Mbekile
- Mpho Mbiyozo
- Vuyo Mbotho
- Siya Mdaka
- Xolani Mdaki
- Luvuyo Memela
- Sinethemba Mjekula
- Sphelele Mkhulise
- Thembani Mkokeli
- Thabo Mngomeni
- Thando Mngomeni
- Kuselo Moyake
- Mihlali Mpongwana
- Zintle Mpupha
- Lubabalo Mtembu
- Dumani Mtya
- Lubabalo Mtyanda
- Lwazi Mvovo
- Buhle Mxunyelwa
- Bantu Mzwakali
- Welcome Ncita
- Ace Ncobo
- Bongani Ndulula
- Akona Ndungane
- Odwa Ndungane
- Mfuneko Ngam
- Anele Ngcongca (1987–2020)
- Thabo Nodada
- Jongi Nokwe
- Luyolo Nomandela
- Sivenathi Nontshinga
- Siyabonga Nontshinga
- Solo Nqweni
- Makhaya Ntini
- Thando Ntini
- Siphosakhe Ntiya-Ntiya
- Scarra Ntubeni
- Ntsikelelo Nyauza
- Sibusiso Papa
- Ayanda Patosi
- Zolani Petelo
- Siphesihle Punguzwa
- Yaw Penxe
- Sinethemba Qeshile
- Thabo September
- Malusi Siboto
- Ngazibini Sigwili
- Mzukisi Sikali
- Zithulele Sinqe
- Lutho Sipamla
- Siyabonga Siphika
- Zanele Situ
- Mkhanyiseli Siwahla
- Kuhle Sonkosi
- Mzwandile Stick
- Zolani Tete
- Aphelele Teto
- Dingaan Thobela
- Mzuvukile Tom
- Thami Tsolekile
- Lonwabo Tsotsobe
- Nomsebenzi Tsotsobe
- Solly Tyibilika
- Simpiwe Vetyeka
- Bayanda Walaza
- Mandisa Williams
- Yanga Xakalashe
- Nkosiyabo Xakane
- Sango Xamlashe
- Lundi Xhongo
- Xolile Yawa
- Mzolisi Yoyo
- Mzwanele Zito
- Masibusane Zongo

== Actors, comedians, models, radio and TV personalities ==
- Zwai Bala
- Masali Baduza
- Amanda Black
- Hlomla Dandala
- Nyaniso Dzedze
- Loyiso Gola
- Tina Jaxa
- Akhumzi Jezile (1989–2018)
- Asanda Jezile
- Atandwa Kani
- John Kani
- Ama Qamata
- Timmy Kwebulana
- Loyiso Macdonald
- Sindiwe Magona
- Miriam Makeba
- Lunathi Mampofu
- Noxolo Maqashalala
- Senzeni Marasela
- Mac Mathunjwa
- Thembsie Matu
- Qhawekazi Mazaleni
- Lusanda Mbane
- Masasa Mbangeni
- Hlubi Mboya
- Anele Mdoda
- Thembisa Mdoda
- Akhenime Mfenyana
- Zenande Mfenyana
- Maxwell Mlilo
- Nambitha Mpumlwana
- Zandile Msutwana
- Linda Mtoba
- Vatiswa Ndara
- Brenda Ngxoli
- Trevor Noah
- Zola Nombona
- Jet Novuka
- Nomhle Nkonyeni
- Tats Nkonzo
- Ray Ntlokwana
- Thoko Ntshinga
- Winston Ntshona
- Zimkhitha Nyoka
- Chumani Pan
- Thulisile Phongolo
- Soso Rungqu
- Luthando Shosha
- Washington Sixolo
- Zikhona Sodlaka
- Natasha Thahane
- Vusi Thanda
- Petronella Tshuma
- Zozibini Tunzi
- Nontsikelelo Veleko
- Zolisa Xaluva
- Sinazo Yolwa

== Criminals ==
- Asande Baninzi
- Bulelani Mabhayi
- Simon Majola
- Luyanda Mboniswa
- Nicholas Lungisa Ncama
- Velaphi Ndlangamandla
- Butana Almond Nofomela
- Khangayi Sedumedi
- Thozamile Taki
- Bulelani Vukwana

== See also ==
- List of current constituent African monarchs
- List of people from the Eastern Cape
- List of South African office-holders
- List of South Africans
- List of Southern Ndebele people
- List of State leaders in the 20th century (1951–2000)
- List of leaders of the TBVC states
- List of Zulu people
- Xhosa clan names
- Xhosa language
- Xhosa language newspapers
- Xhosa people
- Xhosa Wars
