= List of people from the Eastern Cape =

The following is a list of notable people who were born in the Eastern Cape province of South Africa.

== Monarchs ==
- King Zwelibanzi Dalindyebo, Aa! Zwelibanzi! - King of the abaThembu in Bumbane Great Place, Mthatha
- King Zwelenkosi Matanzima, Aa! Zwelenkosi! - King of the Western Thembu in Qamata Great Place, Cofimvaba
- King Zwelozuko Matiwane, Bayethe! Zwelozuko! - King of the AmaMpondomise in Kroza Great Place, Qumbu
- King Vulindlela Ndamase, Vulindlela! - King of the Western Mpondo in Nyandeni Great Place, Libode
- King Zanesizwe Sandile, Aa! Zanesizwe! - King of the Rharhabe sub-group of the Xhosa nation in Mngqesha Great Place, King William's Town
- King Manzolwandle Sigcau, Manzolwandle! - King of the Mpondo in Qaukeni Great Place, Lusikisiki
- King Zwelonke Sigcawu, Aa! Zwelonke! - King of the Xhosa nation in Nqadu Great Place, Willowvale

== Politicians ==
- Neville Alexander
- Steve Biko
- Fort Calata
- James Calata
- Charles Coghlan
- Nosipho Dastile
- Sophia De Bruyn
- Lilian Diedericks
- Cedric Frolick
- John Gomomo
- Matthew Goniwe
- Joe Gqabi
- Oupa Gqozo
- Chris Hani
- Makhanda
- Clarence Makwetu
- Nelson Mandela
- Winnie Mandela
- George Matanzima
- Kaiser Matanzima
- Florence Matomela
- Govan Mbeki
- Thabo Mbeki
- Moeletsi Mbeki
- Epainette Mbeki
- Linda Mbeki
- Jama Mbeki
- Raymond Mhlaba, first Premier of the Eastern Cape
- Sicelo Mhlauli
- Vuyisile Mini
- Sparrow Mkhonto
- Wilton Mkwayi
- Michael Mosoeu Moerane
- Oscar Mpetha
- Griffiths Mxenge
- Victoria Mxenge
- Natasha Ntlangwini
- Alfred Nzo
- Sabelo Phama
- Robert Resha
- Walter Rubusana
- Charles Sebe
- Lennox Sebe
- Archie Sibeko
- Letitia Sibeko
- Bantu Holomisa
- Annie Silinga
- Walter Sisulu
- Albertina Sisulu
- Robert Sobukwe
- David Stuurman
- Oliver Tambo
- Steve Tshwete
- Moses Twebe
- Alfred Xuma

== Celebrities ==
- Sarah Baartman
- Zwai Bala
- Amanda Black
- Busiswa
- Brenda Ngxoli actress
- Allister Coetzee
- Simphiwe Dana
- Lulu Dikana
- Zonke Dikana
- Allan Gray
- Lizo Gqoboka
- iFani
- Akhumzi Jezile
- John Kani
- Ringo Madlingozi
- Mzi Mahola
- Zolani Mahola
- Nathi Mankayi
- Margaret M'cingana Singana
- Zenande Mfenyana
- Maxwell Mlilo
- Nambitha Mpumlwana
- S.E.K. Mqhayi
- Zim Ngqawana
- Zola Nombona
- Jet Novuka
- Zonwabele "Blackie" Tshayana Author
- Siphosakhe Ntiya-Ntiya
- Ntsikelelo Nyauza
- R.L. Peteni
- Tiyo Soga
- Enoch Sontonga
- Mzwandile Stick
- Vusi Thanda
- Zozibini Tunzi
- Gavin Watson

== Criminals ==
- Bulelani Mabhayi
- Nicholas Lungisa Ncama
- Butana Almond Nofomela
- Thozamile Taki
- Bulelani Vukwana

== Athletics ==
- Lukhanyo Am
- Temba Bavuma
- Mark Boucher
- Kermit Erasmus
- Rassie Erasmus
- Siya Kolisi
- Andile Jali
- Sinethemba Jantjie
- Daine Klate
- Wandisile Letlabika
- Cecil Lolo
- Kevin Luiters
- Masibulele Makepula
- Makazole Mapimpi
- Asavela Mbekile
- Mlungisi Mbunjana
- Sinethemba Mjekula
- Bongani Ndulula
- Akona Ndungane
- Odwa Ndungane
- Makhaya Ntini
- Sinethemba Qeshile
- Lonwabo Tsotsobe
- Cheeky Watson
- Luke Watson
- Ronwen Williams

== See also ==
- List of Xhosa people
- List of South Africans
