= Lundi (disambiguation) =

Lundi is French for Monday.

Lundi may also refer to:

- Lundi Mbane (born 1982), South African cricketer
- Lundi Msenge (born 1999), South African rugby union player
- Lundi Tyamara (1978–2017), South African gospel singer also mononymously known as Lundi
- Lundi Xhongo (born 1983), former South African cricketer
- Guðrún frá Lundi (1887–1975), Icelandic writer
- Hok Lundy (1950–2008), Cambodian politician also known as Hok Lundi
- Monika Lundi (1942–2025), German television and film actress
- Runde River, river in southeastern Zimbabwe formerly known as the Lundi River

== See also ==
- Lundy (disambiguation)
