= Dumile =

Dumile may refer to:

- Daniel Dumile (1971–2020), British rapper with stage name MF Doom
- Dumile Feni (1942–1991), South African contemporary visual artist
