= Nontshinga =

Nontshinga is a surname. Notable people with the surname include:

- Sivenathi Nontshinga (born 1998), South African boxer
- Siyabonga Nontshinga (born 1987), South African soccer player
