= Mongezi Gum =

South African artist

Mongezi Gum – (Gum Mongezi Mongshai, born in Langa, 23 September 1970) is a South African township artist, working in painting. His exhibits have been displayed mostly in South Africa.

== Early years ==
Born in the township of Langa, in the Cape Flats of Cape Town on 23 September 1970, Mongezi Gum attended later Jumba High School where he graduated in 1992.

His passion for art took off when he was quite young. He started drawing characters from movie posters but art schools for blacks in Cape Town were scarce at the time, so he decided to move to Johannesburg.

There, he completed his studies in painting, drawing, sculpting and printmaking at the Johannesburg Art Foundation where he received his Diploma in Fine Arts in 1994.

He then returned to the city of his birth, Cape Town, to pursue a career in art making.

== Art career ==
Working from Greatmore Studios in Woodstock, Gum believes that art can be a means of multicultural exchange, different cultures exposing their particular traditions through their art. His subject matter thus portrays a combination of traditional African and contemporary "township" values, often depicting rural Xhosa people in customary attire alongside the urban inhabitants of the suburbs on the Cape Flats which constitute his daily surroundings and condition his lifestyle.

Mongezi Gum's artwork represents scenes from South African townships. His paintings include imagery such as shacks, taps, buckets, washing lines, churchgoers, squatters, refuse collectors, dancers, musicians, donkeys, and goats.

One highlight of his career is the large-scale murals at the Oprah Winfrey Leadership School for Girls, located in Henley on Klip (Gauteng Province). He has also worked for the Century Art Gallery in Fordsburg as a Graphic designer. Gum has also participated in mural paintings for local shops, pre-schools and local hairdressers. Gum's work is represented in the corporate collections of Truworths, Woolworth and the University of Cape Town, and in numerous private collections in South Africa and abroad, like in Germany, the United Kingdom and the United States.

=== Exhibitions ===
- 1998–2001: participated in four Thupelo Regional workshops and exhibitions in the Annex of the South African National Gallery
- 1999: participated in a group show at Artscape
- 2000: solo exhibition of mixed media works at the Metropolitan
- 2001: first show, at AVA, sponsored by AVA's Artreach fund
- 2003: participated in an exhibition at the AVA gallery
- 2004: participated in the Everard Read Galleries, "10 Years of Democracy Exhibit" with nine other promising artists from South Africa.
- 2013: exhibition in Gallery G2 in Cape Town
- 2013: exhibition at Roots Art Gallery in Soweto
- 2013: exhibition at The Gallery at Grande Provence Wine Estate in Franschhoek
- 2019: solo exhibition at 16 on Lerotholi Gallery [Langa]

=== Awards ===
2000: received an award for upcoming young artist from Truworths 2001: one of his works printed onto carry bags produced by Woolworths Holdings Limited 2002: finalist in a competition for new talent organized by Sanlam

=== Criticism ===
In response to assertions that this genre of art production falls into the well worn trap of romanticizing poverty and squalor while exploiting hardship, Gum believes that artists' tendency to criticize other artists instead of uplifting and supporting them creates a negativity which is counterproductive and contrary to a spirit of communal responsibility to which he is dedicated.

== Involvement in the township ==
Though he is recognised in his community as an artist and a painter he is also involved in community projects in Langa, which he undertakes out of a sense of responsibility to the community. He is a builder and member of the "Ubuntu Youth Development" project in Langa where he works to reduce crime, educate youth and bring humanity to the society. The melding of his community involvement and his artistic talent resulted in his success as a mural painter. He has worked on a variety of murals in his area, at taxi ranks, meeting places and at the Renowned Tigers Tavern in Langa.

== See also ==
- Langa, Cape Town
- Curate Africa Project
- Gerard Sekoto
- George Pemba

South African Township artists

- Jen Adam
- Katherine Ambrose
- Mauro Chiarla
- Benjamin Mitchley
- Lazarus Ramontseng
- Frank Ross (artist)
- Roeloff Rossouw
- Francis Sibanda
- Peter Sibeko
