= Mhlobo Jadezweni =

South African academic and author

Mhlobo Wabantwana Jadezweni
- Born: 14 June 1954 (age 72); Idutywa, Eastern Cape, Union of South Africa
- Citizenship: South African
- Occupations: Lecturer in Xhosa literature and language Author
- Years active: 1983–present
- Known for: The book: uTshepo Mde: Tall Enough
- Board member of: African Language Association of South Africa; Southern African Folklore Society
- Spouse: Nokuzola Jadezweni
- Awards: Pan-South African Language Board award

Academic background
- Education: University of Fort Hare; Stellenbosch University

Academic work
- Discipline: Linguist
- Sub-discipline: Xhosa literature, language, poetry

Xhosa
Pronunciation of the word: Xhosa

Mhlobo Wabantwana Jadezweni (born 14 June 1954) is a South African academic and author. He has degrees from the University of Fort Hare and Stellenbosch University. He has been attached to the Department of African Languages at Stellenbosch University since 1983, where he teaches Xhosa literature and language, and studies isiXhosa poetry. He has served on various Xhosa language boards since 1984 and is chairperson of the isiXhosa Lexicography Unit at Fort Hare.

== Education and career ==
Jadezweni was born on 14 June 1954 in Idutywa, Eastern Cape, South Africa. He attended St John's College in Umtata. He obtained a BA at University of Fort Hare and his BA Hons and MA at Stellenbosch University. He completed his teacher's diploma at Cicira Teachers' Training College in 1974 and taught at schools in the Transkei.

In 1983 he joined the Department of African Languages at Stellenbosch University. He was a guest academic at Leipzig University in 1998-99 and at the University of Bayreuth in 2002.

== Memberships and awards ==
- Pan-South African Language Board award for the promotion of Xhosa language and literature (2011)
- Member of the Stellenbosch University Open Day Committee (1996–present)
- Member of Stellenbosch University's Strategic Planning Committee (1998–present)
- Member of the Marketing Committee of the Faculty of Arts at Stellenbosch University (2001–present)
- He serves on provincial and national language committees and organisations, including the African Language Association of South Africa and the Southern African Folklore Society.

== Works ==
Jadezweni is the author of a multi-lingual children's book called uTshepo Mde: Tall Enough. The book is written in Xhosa and English and has been published in several bi-lingual editions, including Afrikaans, Swedish and Portuguese. The book was nominated as a South African honorary book by International Board on Books for Young People (IBBY).

He is the author of several publications on Xhosa poets and writers and has translated stories for the chapter Xhosa Skrywers (Xhosa Authors) in the Afrikaans book Ensiklopedie van die Wêreld (Encyclopedia of the World).

Jadeweni wrote or contributed to the following books:

- IsiXhosa Esitsha (New Xhosa) (1986)
- Isahluko sokugqibela (The Last Chapter) (2000)
- The rights of a child (2004)

== Personal life ==
Jadezweni is married to Nokuzola Jadezweni, a school teacher in Khayelitsha. They have three children.
