= Umteteli wa Bantu =

South African newspaper (1920–1991)

Umteteli wa Bantu (translated as The Mouthpiece of the Native People) was a Johannesburg-based newspaper, first published on 1 May 1920. Initially printed weekly, the publication transitioned to fortnightly in 1975, until its final issues were published in 1991. Printed in English, isiXhosa, isiZulu, and Sesotho, it served as an important platform for black intellectual and political discourse in South Africa.

== History ==
Umteteli wa Bantu was established in 1920 by the Chamber of Mines and the Native Recruiting Corporation (NRC) following the 1920 mineworkers' strike. The newspaper was created to counter the influence of Abantu Batho, an African National Congress (ANC) publication. The paper was anti-communist.

During the 1930s, the newspaper frequently covered legislation and proclamations affecting black South Africans. It also provided detailed reports on global events leading up to World War II, keeping its readership informed on war developments and the role of black South African soldiers.

== Format and transition ==
Originally a weekly newspaper from 1920 to 1955, Umteteli wa Bantu transitioned to a monthly publication in 1956, then changed to a fortnightly format in 1975, until its discontinuation in 1991.

- 1956–1975: Published monthly under the title Umteteli wa Bantu e Goli.
- 1975–1991: Published fortnightly under the title Mining Sun.

== Impact and legacy ==
Umteteli wa Bantu played a crucial role in shaping black intellectual thought in South Africa. The publication provided a platform for writers, poets, and activists to engage in political discourse and challenge colonial narratives.

Notable contributors included:

- Nontsizi Mgqwetho, a pioneering Xhosa poet known for her political and social critiques.
- Various political commentators who debated issues of land dispossession, labor rights, and racial segregation.

== Archival access ==
Historical editions of Umteteli wa Bantu are preserved in various locations, including the University of Johannesburg Library and the National Library of South Africa. Researchers can access digital archives through:

- [University of Johannesburg Library – TEBA Collection](https://www.uj.ac.za/library/information-resources/special-collections/online-exhibitions/the-teba-collection/umteteli-wa-bantu/)
- [National Library of South Africa Digital Archives – CONTENTdm Collection](https://cdm21048.contentdm.oclc.org/digital/collection/p21048coll32/id/92)
