= Timmy Kwebulana =

South African actor (1941–2024)

- Born: Timmy Kwebulana; 1941; Cape Town, South Africa
- Died: 19 September 2024 (aged 83)
- Occupation: Actor
- Notable work: Abakwazidenge; Ingqumbo Yeminyanya; Unyana Womntu; Uthando Lwethu; Shooting Stars; Forced Love; Isikizi

Timmy Kwebulana (1941 – 19 September 2024) was a South African actor.

Kwebulana appeared in Abakwazidenge, Ingqumbo Yeminyanya, Unyana Womntu, Uthando Lwethu, Shooting Stars, Forced Love and Isikizi. He died on 19 September 2024, at the age of 83.
