= Mamela Nyamza =

South African dancer, teacher, choreographer, and activist

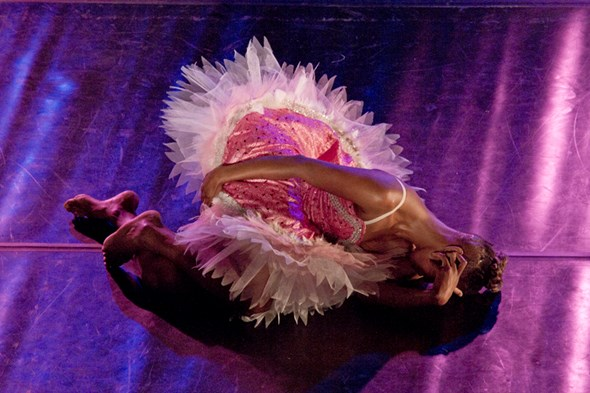
- Nyamza (2013)
- Born: Mamela Miranda Nyamza; 1976 (age 49–50); Gugulethu, Cape Town, South Africa
- Occupations: Dancer, teacher, choreographer, director
- Career
- Current group: Mamelas Artistic Movement
- Former groups: State Theatre Dance Company, Free Flight Dance Company, The Lion King, African Foot Prints, We Will Rock You

Mamela Nyamza is a dancer, teacher, choreographer, curator, director and activist in South Africa. She is trained in a variety of styles of dance including ballet, modern dance, African dance, the Horton technique, Spanish dance, jazz, movement and mime, flying low technique, release technique, gumboot dance and Butoh. Her style of dance and choreography blends aspects of traditional and contemporary dances. Nyamza has performed nationally and internationally. She has choreographed autobiographical, political, and social pieces both on her own and in collaboration with other artists. She draws inspiration from her daily life and her childhood growing up in Gugulethu, as well as her identity as a homosexual, Black, South African woman. She uses her platform to share some of the traumas faced by South African lesbians, such as corrective rape. Additionally, she has created various community outreach projects that have spread dance to different communities within South Africa, including the University of Stellenbosch's Project Move 1524, a group that uses dance therapy to educate on issues relating to HIV/AIDS, domestic violence and drug abuse.

== Early life ==
Mamela Nyamza was born in 1976 into a large family living in Gugulethu, Cape Town, South Africa. Growing up in Gugulethu had an enormous influence on Nyamza's career as a dancer. She explained that the environment in which she was immersed "did not give [her] a choice but to love dance. There was music and sound, all day long, and even in the streets the noise became the music...I used my body as the instrument to react to all forms of sound, whether it be playing, crying, or watching all sorts of things that one can imagine happened in Gugulethu in the '80s".

Nyamza has cited her mother's death as a motivating factor, "After my mother died, I could feel her in my dreams telling me to use my dance to tell real stories. I also later came out of the closet, and I started experiencing discrimination in society and that's when I thought, 'You know, I'm an artist, so let me be the voice that addresses all these issues'".

== Education ==
Nyamza began her training as a dancer at the Zama Dance School under the Royal Academy of Dance while also attending Fezeka High School in Gugulethu. She continued her training at the Pretoria Dance Technikon where she received a National Diploma in Ballet. In 1998, Nyamza was granted a one-year fellowship to dance at the Alvin Ailey Dance Theatre in New York. The Alvin Ailey school provided Nyamza with an opportunity to dance alongside other Black ballet dancers, which was an experience she did not have in South Africa. Upon graduation, she joined the State Theatre Dance Company with whom she did performances both nationally and internationally. Additionally, she has attended various intensive workshops and classes including a choreographic workshop at the Vienna International Dance festival, ballet training with Martin Schonberg through the Pact Dance Company, African Dance workshops in Soweto with Germaine Acogny, and a course in directing at Sadler's Wells Theatre in London.

== Community outreach programs ==
Nyamza has participated in various volunteer and community outreach projects — including ballet teaching in Mamelodi, volunteering at Thembalethu Day School for the Disabled, and launching a project at the University of Stellenbosch that uses dance therapy to educate the public on issues relating to HIV/AIDS, domestic violence, and drug abuse. Nyamza says that "Art has developed me, and opened a totally different book for me to explore the impossible which is now possible...Giving back to the community is helping those that come from where I come from, and showing them that this art...can heal a lot of them that are born out of issues just like myself".

== Career ==
Nyamza has a style of dance that blends modern and traditional forms of music. Her self-choreographed ballets explore cultural problems in society and work to normalizes Black representation in ballet. Due to her style of dance and choreography, Nyamza has become well known in the South African dance scene.

Thus far in her dance career, Nyamza has held the role of dancer, choreographer, and teacher. In her early career, she performed in various major international musicals including The Lion King in Den Haag, Netherlands in 2004,We Will Rock You in South Africa in 2006, and African Footprints.

Nyamza's choreography strives to focus on the narratives of Black women. Some of the topics she examines are domesticity, traditional roles of Black women in society, and commodification of female bodies. Her work also portrays the violence that women in South Africa face, displaying scenes of corrective rape and murder that are avoided in most traditional ballet choreography.

One of Nyamza's most known choreographic pieces is Hatched. Choreographed in 2008, Hatched has since been performed at the Out The Box Festival, the Baxter Dance Festival, and at the World Population Foundation. Additionally, Nyamza did informal studio performances of Hatch in Brazil, Vienna, as well as selected schools in the Eastern Cape, Durban and Cape Town and at the South African Domestic Violence conference in Johannesburg. She has also performed the piece in various shelters for women in the Netherlands. She has often performed the piece with her son, Amukele.

In 2009, Nyamza was selected to be the South African representative to travel to Los Angeles, United States and compete as one of eight countries in Superstars of Dance—a show on the NBC television network. There she performed a piece entitled Afro-fusion, which told the story of a woman who was frustrated with her marriage and life. Although she did not win the show, the judges awarded her 58 points. Nyamza served as a choreographer for the American television show So You Think You Can Dance? in 2008.

In 2011 Nyamza was given the Standard Bank Young Artist Award. Along with the other Standard Bank Young Artist Award winners, Nyamza showcased her work at the 2011 National Arts Festival in South Africa. There she performed the pieces Isingqala and Amafongkong, which featured a solo work by Nyamza and was a collaborative production with the Adugna Dance Theatre Company from Ethiopia. Nyamza said that her intention in creating Amafongkong was to use an open space to explore the notion of "collaboration" by "seeing how and where similar and different bodies could meet in movement". Nyamza choreographed Isingqala to be a personal, autobiographical narrative surrounding the rape and murder of her mother. Crying and crying out are used repeatedly by Nyamza throughout Isingqala in order to demonstrate experiences of pain.

Mamela Nyamza collaborated with UK-based artist, Mojisola Adebayo, to create I Stand Corrected. The piece addresses issues of homophobia and rape that Nyamza describes as "Dark, strange, witty and absurd". In it, Nyamza is killed for being a lesbian, and is coming back to "correct herself". The piece premiered in South Africa and ran for three weeks at the Ovalhouse in London, where it was met with full houses. Additionally, I Stand Corrected was nominated for six Offies.

I Stand Corrected was also performed at the Soweto Theatre in South Africa. Of this she said "I have performed in Soweto, and because of that I'm the proudest artist ever...It's sad that we still have to struggle for funding here at home, while internationally we don't even have to apply, we just get invited".

In March 2013 she performed at Infecting the City in Cape Town, South Africa. She said that this project "places exciting new artworks in unexpected spaces in the middle of the City [to] challenge Cape Town's ideas of art and public space". Nyamza plans to continue creating work that shares African stories and experiences with the rest of the world for as long as she can.

In 2013, Nyamza choreographed 19-born-76-rebels. Her choreography considers South Africa's past in relation to its present by recreating the Soweto riots and massacre in 1976. The narrative she develops focuses on lack of good education available to Black South African children at the time. Some of the issues highlighted by the choreography, and by extension the riots, were the problems resulting from overcrowded classrooms, ill-equipped teachers, and the implementation of Afrikaans as the compulsory language of instruction. Nyamza herself was born in 1976, the same year as the riots. Her mother had been pregnant while involved in the riots.

In 2018, Nyamza formed part of The Centre for the Less Good Idea's Season 4 performances. The centre, started by South African artist William Kentridge, is an incubation space for collaborative and experimental arts, and is located in Maboneng, Johannesburg. Nyamza performed Black Privilege, a work "informed by the notion and experience of rejection of the other by mainstream gate-keeping institutions".

Nyamza is formally trained in ballet, and got further training at the Alvin Ailey New York School of Dance as visiting scholar. This is where Nyamza began to tackle the classical genre of dance, by deconstructing the traditional methods and logic of ballet and contemporary dance. Her ground-breaking works, “The Dying Swan” – innovation in the dance in 1998; “Hatched” – against patriarchy in 2007, and “The Meal” – against elitist ballet in 2012, are autobiographical works that trample on the norms of the classics. Her other works include: “Black Privilege” – against injustices of women; “Pest Control” – miscarriage of justice within the arts formalized institutions; and "Grounded" - reflection of contemporary narratives and dramaturgy behind political discourses of dialogue and performance between the contemporary artist and audience. Mamela Nyamza received these awards: chosen as the Featured Artist of the Grahamstown Standard Bank National Arts Festival 2018, a first of its kind for the dance art genre; awarded the FNB Dance Indaba Award for Outstanding Performance by a Female Dancer in Contemporary Style for “The Dying Swan” in 2000; chosen in 2011 as the Standard Bank Young Artist for the Dance; in 2016, awarded the Imbokodo Award for Dance; and, in 2022, Nyamza received an award from Burkina Faso Festival International de Danse de Ouagadougou (2022), the Marraines FIDO 2022. Nyamza was also identified by the Daily Review article by Shawn Lent in 2018: http://www.dailyreview.com.au. of Australia as one of the 30 International Artists to track in 2018, that are positively changing the world. Nyamza was invited to take part in the Dance Future 11: Focus Pina Bausch 2017 in Germany, in which Pina Bausch, was celebrated. For the 2020 and 2022 seasons, Nyamza was temporary based at the Theatre Chatelet, Paris in France as a choreographer for the African production Le Vol du Boli, under the direction of Abderrahmane Sissako of Mali. In June 2022, Nyamza was appointed a curator for the artistic programme Africa, by the Staatstheatre Mainz in Germany, for the Tanz Kongress 22, under the theme "Sharing Potentials". The ultimate vision for Nyamza, is to make dance as the genre of the performance art, to convey body politics on all social issues, and not to entertain but to "edutain".

== Gallery ==
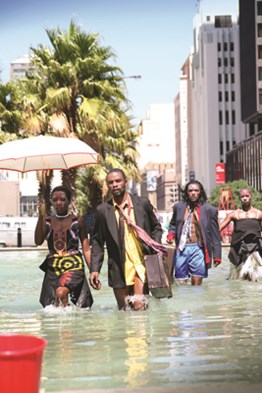
Waking Time (2008)

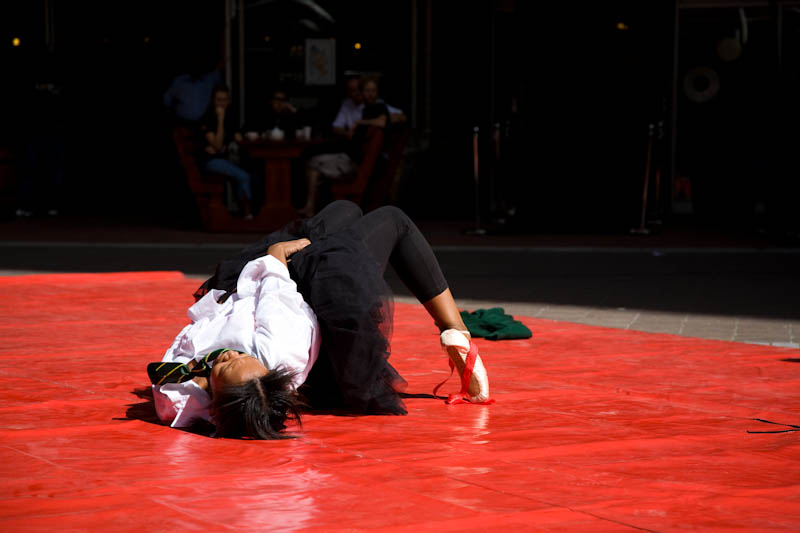
Infecting the City (2010)

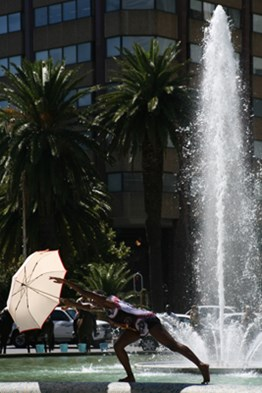
Waking Time (2008)
