= Dora Nginza =

South African nurse (1891–1955)

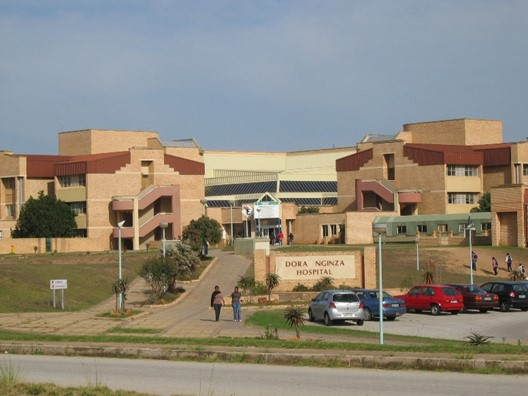
Dora Nginza Hospital in Zwide, Port Elizabeth, Eastern Cape, South Africa

Dora Nginza, known as the "Mother of New Brighton" (17 October 1891 – 1955), was a nursing sister who was one of the earliest and most influential pioneers of public health service for black people in New Brighton, Port Elizabeth, Eastern Cape, South Africa.

== Biography ==
Dora Nginza was born Dora Jacob to Mr and Mrs Hermanus Nyamezela Jacob on 17 October 1891 in Cradock in the Cape Colony. Her parents were illiterate because of racial segregation and economic exploitation. Her two brothers, Frank and John became trained policemen despite the tumultuous time. When they realized that "coloured" policemen earned more money than their "black" counterparts, they edited their father's surname from Jacob to Jacobs, and registered themselves as "coloured" on the police salary sheets. Dora's father died when she was young. She received her early education in Cradock, using the edited surname "Jacobs", and later furthered it in Port Elizabeth. She went on to train as a nurse at the Victoria Hospital, Lovedale in Alice, Eastern Cape during World War I, being one of the first three African nurses to train under Niel Mac Vicar. She subsequently passed the qualifying SAMDC examination for registration as a nurse at the Port Elizabeth Provincial Hospital in 1919. On 20 January 1920 she qualified as a full nurse.

In 1923, she married Chief Henry Nginza from the Gcaleka clan under AmaRharhabe. She and her husband Henry lived with their adopted children, son Velile and daughter Christine in New Brighton. When her husband died on 12 September 1943, a new headman had to be found. The Paramount Chief of the AmaRharhabe, Archibald Velile Sandile, bestowed the chieftainship of the Gcaleka clan on her. Until her death, she remained a representative of the Eastern Cape Urban Area, conferring and deliberating with men on civic matters.

Sister Nginza retired from nursing in 1954 and died in June 1966 at Livingstone Hospital after a short illness at the age of 75. She was buried next to her husband, and later reburied on the grounds of the Dora Nginza Hospital in Zwide Township, Port Elizabeth.

=== Nursing ===
According to field research conducted by scholars on black health care workers in South Africa, during the apartheid regime many people who became nurses and doctors felt intensely drawn to healthcare. Some felt it was a religious calling while others believed it to be a more general call to heal the sick and to help those in distress. Upon the completion of her schooling and training, Sister Dora started working on 1 November 1919 and was the first district nurse to practice in New Brighton, outside Port Elizabeth, Eastern Cape. At the time of her appointment New Brighton had a high mortality rate and little medical attendance. She started working in a simple house that served as a makeshift hospital with only six stretchers, provided by the government. . Her work in the development of healthcare in the township was commended by the Department of Native Affairs. Nginza was joined by two Lovedale-trained general nurses, and the team paid visits to the population of 6,000 in New Brighton as well as running a small hospital. Sister Nginza also served as the midwife, cook and cleaner. In 1923, she was transferred to the Port Elizabeth Health Department as a senior nursing sister, but continued providing healthcare in New Brighton. Sister Nginza retired in 1954 after 35 years of nursing service, leaving the New Brighton clinic with a staff of 25 registered nurses to provide community health services. She was dubbed the "Mother of New Brighton" due to her commitment to well-being there.

== Accolades ==
- Single-handedly, amid cultural scepticism, discrimination, poverty, ignorance about healthy healthcare practices and the devastating 1920 labour unrest, established a comprehensive health service in New Brighton, Port Elizabeth.
- Gained recognition as a key contributor to a major medical breakthrough in the diagnosis of typhus fever during the typhus fever epidemic, teaching the doctors.
- In 1927, was delegated to Switzerland and England as the member of the Re-Armament Movement.
- Excelled as a role model nurse and leader in the Xhosa and broader community during her lifetime. This earned her the title of A! Nobantu (mother of the nation).
- Was bestowed the chieftainship in 1945 by the paramount chief of the AmaRharhabe after the death of her husband, headman John Henry Nginza. She remained the representative of the Eastern Cape urban area until her death in 1966, exceptionally for a woman at the time.
- She was awarded a gold wristwatch by the New York-based Council for African Affairs in 1951, the first African woman to receive an award that was annually allocated to people who did public work that benefited African people.
- In 1954, the Mayor of Port Elizabeth, Louis Dubb, presented her with a silver tray as a token of Port Elizabeth's appreciation for her faithful service to the residents of New Brighton.

== Legacy ==
Today, in the Zwide location, the Dora Nginza Hospital, named after the pioneer of medical healthcare for black people in Port Elizabeth, stands as a monument in recognition of her service to the black people in Port Elizabeth and its environment over 35 years. It has 570 active beds and offers Level 2 & Level 3 health care services to the community of Port Elizabeth and surrounding areas. In 2001, an honorary doctorate was awarded posthumously to her by the University of Port Elizabeth. The Friends of Dora Nginza Society, an NGO, was established.

== See also ==
- Nelson Mandela Bay Municipality
- List of hospitals in South Africa
