= Nkosiyabo Xakane =

South Africa soccer player

Personal information
- Full name: Vincent Nkosiyabo Xakane
- Date of birth: 21 July 1985 (age 41)
- Place of birth: Cape Town, South Africa
- Position: Defender

Team information
- Current team: FC Cape Town
- Number: 5

Senior career*
Years	Team	Apps	(Gls)
2011–2013	Black Leopards	50	(2)
2013–	FC Cape Town	21	(0)
- * Club domestic league appearances and goals as of 7 August 2014

Nkosiyabo Xakane (born 21 July 1985) is a South African soccer player who played as a defender for FC Cape Town in the National First Division.
