= Falo Mgudlwa =

Falo ka Mgudlwa
- Chief of AmaJumba Clan, of the abaThembu people
Names
- Inkosi uFalo Mgudlwa
- House: Elucwecwe, Qhumanco Location, St Marks

Chief Falo kaMgudlwa (Falo son-of-Mgudlwa) was a Chief of AmaJumba Clan, of the abaThembu people near Qhumanco, Ngcobo. His household was based at Lucwecwe.

== Family ==
The Mgudlwa line was established by Falo's father, the Chief Mgudlwa kaJumba ("Mgudlwa son-of-Jumba"). Mgudlwa led his people to settle at Qhumanco, in agreement with the Qwathi Chief Dalasile of the royal Gcaleka house of Hintsa in 1860. Falo and his brother Langa were sons of Chief Mgudlwa. His sister Nowaka married Chief Dalasile. Chief Mgudlwa, who was instrumental in bringing a new formal schooling system to his region of Thembuland, fought and died in the rebellion of 1880–81, against the British and the Sprigg Government of the Cape.

== Biography ==
Falo kaMgudlwa had a long tenure as Chief. His principal councillor was the warrior Mbombini Molteno kaSihele. Mbombini was a large, fierce man of great cunning and charisma. In spite of being illiterate, in later life Mbombini became a national poet for the Thembu people, and a keeper of Thembu oral history and lore. Falo was instrumental in establishing a mission station in the region. Through Mbombini's influence, he also contributed to the "Thembu History per Chief Falo Mgudlwa at Qumanco" (18/06/35. McLaughlin Papers, Cory Library, Grahamstown). His homestead became a major repository of history for the Thembu and Qwathi nations, and several chroniclers such as Cronje Mlahleni Xundu spent time in his household to study this history.

Kaiser Matanzima spent a portion of his childhood in the household of Chief Mgudlwa {esitya amasi enkomo zendlu kaMgudlwa}.

Falo was one of the first Chiefs of his nation to convert to Christianity. The later Thembu Council writer described him as having unusually dark complexion, a birth mark and extraordinary physical strength. He died at the age of 95. His death was followed by numerous disputes among his adopted sons Qaqawuli (Qaqauli) and Daliwonga, and succession disputes among his own children. His own children included Matsolo, Harold Guleni, Colenzo, Attwell, Isaac, Cecil, Stormont, and Buller. Mbombini, who had been charged by Falo on his death bed, to look after his descendants, was involved in resolving these disputes. In resolution, Falo was succeeded as Chief by his sons Matsolo and Harold Guleni Mgudlwa.
