= Bhurhu kaKhawuta =

Bhurhu ka Khawuta (c. 1785–1857) was the elder brother of King Hintsa and Malashe. As Hintsa was born by Khawuta's Great wife, Hintsa succeeded Khawuta. Bhurhu was very active in the wars in which Hintsa led the Xhosa nation, as he was the sub chief of the Gcaleka. He played a huge role in Hintsa's leadership, having been regent at certain instances. Bhurhu died in 1857 and his resting place is in Ngqamakwe, he was succeeded as a senior chief by his son Mapasa, who led along the area known as Tutura and beyond.
