= Wiseman Lumkile Nkuhlu =

South African chartered accountant (born 1944)

Professor Wiseman Nkuhlu GCOB
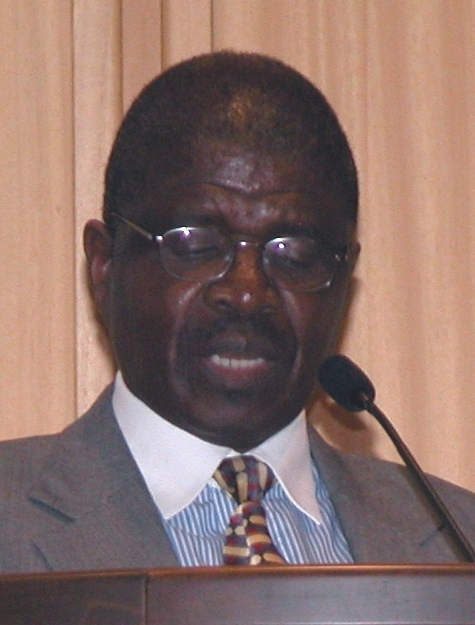
- Nkuhlu in 2003
- Born: February 5, 1944 (age 82); Cala, Cape Province, Union of South Africa
- Education: University of Fort Hare (BCom); University of Cape Town (CTA); New York University (MBA)
- Occupations: Chartered Accountant CA(SA); Business Executive
- Known for: First black Chartered Accountant in South Africa; Economic Advisor to the President; Founding CEO of NEPAD Secretariat
- Title: Chairman of KPMG South Africa

Wiseman Lumkile Nkuhlu GCOB (born 5 February 1944 in Cala, Eastern Cape) is a South African chartered accountant, academic, and business leader. He became the first Black South African to qualify as a chartered accountant (CA(SA)) in 1976. Nkuhlu was Economic Advisor to President Thabo Mbeki from 2000 to 2004 and chaired the Development Bank of Southern Africa’s Transition Team in 1995. He held the position of Chancellor of the University of Pretoria from 2006 until June 2022. He is chairman of KPMG South Africa.

== Career and Contributions ==
After qualifying as South Africa's first black chartered accountant in 1976, Nkuhlu embarked on a career that seamlessly blended academia, public service, and corporate leadership. He began lecturing at the University of Fort Hare and later was Principal and Vice-Chancellor of the University of Transkei from 1987 to 1991. In 1998, he was appointed the inaugural chairperson of the Council on Higher Education, playing a pivotal role in restructuring South Africa's higher education landscape.

In the public sector, Nkuhlu was appointed Economic Advisor to President Thabo Mbeki from 2000 to 2004. During this period, he also was Chief Executive of the Secretariat of the New Partnership for Africa’s Development (NEPAD), contributing significantly to the development and promotion of the NEPAD policy framework across the continent.

Nkuhlu's corporate engagements include chairing the Development Bank of Southern Africa and holding directorships at companies such as AngloGold Ashanti, Datatec, and Metropolitan Limited. He also was Chairman of KPMG South Africa, where he was instrumental in steering the firm through reputational challenges following its involvement in state capture controversies.

In recognition of his contributions, Nkuhlu has received numerous accolades, including honorary doctorates from several South African universities and the Grand Counselor of the Order of the Baobab in Silver, awarded by former president Thabo Mbeki, for his exceptional service to the nation.
