= Hill of Fools =

Novel by R. L. Peteni

- Author: R.L. Peteni
- Language: English
- Publication date: 1976

Hill of Fools is a 1976 English-language novel by Xhosa novelist R.L. Peteni. The novel was later republished by Heineman as part of their African Writers Series in 1980, and subsequently translated into the Xhosa language in 1980, published under the title Kwazidenge. The plot focuses on the feud between two villages. The novel was Peteni's only novel.

The novel has been widely adopted in the school curriculum, despite some criticism by more conservative commentators for its sexual and racy elements. An adaptation of the novel was created into a television show by the SABC. Willia Thambo and Amanda Quwe starred in the film.
