= George Pemba =

South African painter and writer (1912–2001)

George Milwa Mnyaluza Pemba (1912 in Korsten, Port Elizabeth – 2001) was a South African painter and writer. He was posthumously awarded the Order of Ikhamanga.

== Biography ==
Pemba was born in 1912 in Hill's Kraal, Korsten, Port Elizabeth. He was the fifth child of Rebecca and Titus Pemba. He attended Van der Kemp Mission Primary School until 1924 when he won the Grey Scholarship to attend Paterson Secondary School. As a child he was encouraged by his father to draw and paint, and so began painting murals in the family house and producing portraits from photographs of his father's employers. His father was killed in a motorcycle accident in 1926.

He won a Grey Scholarship, which enabled him to receive post primary education, and in 1931 he obtained a Teacher's Diploma at the Lovedale Training College in the Eastern Cape. At Lovedale, Pemba produced illustrations for books published by the Lovedale Press and was mentored by Reverend R. H. W. Shepherd, the last ordained Principal of Lovedale. He continued to work there until 1936 until he took up a teaching post at the Wesleyan Mission School in King William's Town. He left teaching after seven years to take up a better-paid job as messenger of the Native Commissioner's Court, and then as a rent collector for the Township Administration.

The following year he studied under Professor Austin Winter Moore for five months at Rhodes University, made possible through a bursary awarded from the Bantu Welfare Trust. Pemba was awarded a second bursary in 1941. This time he spent two weeks at Maurice van Essche's studio in Cape Town attending art classes. It was at Maurice van Essche's studio where he met Gerard Sekoto and John Mohl. Sekoto encouraged him to work as a full-time artist and change his medium from watercolour to oils. He travelled to Johannesburg, Durban, KwaZulu-Natal, Umtata and Basutoland painting portraits of the indigenous peoples he met in the different regions.

From 1952 to 1978 he supplemented his income selling groceries in a spaza shop called Gabby's Store. Following that, Pemba taught art to children at the S.A. Institute of Race Relations and in 1979 was awarded an Honorary Master of Arts Degree from the University of Fort Hare. George Pemba experimented with painting and became a famous watercolour and oil painter.

A highly successful exhibition of paintings from the 1940s onwards, was held at The Everard Read Gallery in 1991. In 1992 a second exhibition served to commemorate his 80th birthday, which was also celebrated with the artist at the King George VI Art Gallery in Port Elizabeth.

== Career ==
Pemba's first work was first exhibited at the Feather Market Hall in Port Elizabeth in 1928, when he was sixteen. In 1934, Pemba was treated for a burst appendix and he spent his hospital stay drawing pictures of nurses and doctors. His hospital drawings caught the attention of landscape painter Ethel Smythe who took an interest in Pemba and offered him tutelage. Smythe possessed a large collection of books that introduced him to the work of Rembrandt Harmenszoon van Rijn, Diego Velázquez and impressionism. In 1937, Pemba received first prize in the May Esther Bedford Competition where the musician and artist Gerard Sekoto received second prize. His first commission came in 1950, in the form of a portrait of the educator and activist, Professor Davidson Don Tengo Jabavu for the University of Fort Hare.

Pemba produced a satirical cartoon for the first edition of the African National Congress' newspaper Isizwe released in June 1959.

Pemba, was also a writer, who wrote and staged at least two plays - The Story of Nongqawuse and The Xhosa Prophet Ntsikana. He later produced painting to illustrate the plays. South African heritage Project.

== Recognition and awards ==
Pemba's paintings are noted for their composition and their bold use of colour. He is recognised as a pioneer of social realism in South Africa.

In 1995, Barry Feinberg produced a documentary on George called George Pemba: A Painter of the People in collaboration with the Mayibuye Centre for History and Culture.

- In 1996, the Iziko South African National Gallery held a retrospective of his work, entitled The George Milwa Mnyaluza Pemba Retrospective Exhibition.
- In 2004, the South African Government awarded Pemba with The Order of Ikhamanga in Gold posthumously for his contribution to art and literature.
- In 2012, on the 100th anniversary of the artist's birth, the South African Post Office released a set of 10 commemorative stamps featuring some of Pemba’s best-known artworks. 300 000 miniature stamp sheets were printed and distributed.
- In 2017, an exhibition of Pemba's work was hosted at the Nelson Mandela Metropolitan Art Museum.
