= Malashe ka Khawuta =

Younger brother of Hintsa kaKhawuta

Malashe ka Khawuta (born late 1700s) was the younger son of King Khawuta and a younger brother of King Hintsa and Chief Bhurhu.

As sub-chief of the Gcaleka, Chief Malashe was active in wars that Hintsa led the Xhosa nation in, functioning as Hintsa's advisor.

Malashe's descendants still hold royal status and head a sub-section of the Xhosa nation in the Centane and Willowvale areas.
