= Sam Nolutshungu =

South African academic (1945–1997)

Samuel Clement Nolutshungu (15 April 1945 – 12 August 1997) was one of the foremost South African scholars, and an internationally acclaimed expert on South African politics.

Born in King William's Town in 1945, he studied first in the Lovedale High School and after in the University of Fort Hare. Because of apartheid he left in the 1960s South Africa for England, and thanks to a scholarship went to Keele University where he obtained a first class degree in economics, history and politics. He successively taught in the Government Department of Manchester University between 1978 and 1990. From 1991 till his death he was professor of political science and African politics at the University of Rochester, and since 1995 also acting director of the university's Frederick Douglass Institute for African and African-American Studies.

In December 1996 he had been offered the most important position in the South African university system, the vice-chancellorship of the University of the Witwatersrand, but was forced to turn down the offer in January due to a cancer that brought to his death in Rochester on 12 August.

Nolutshungu produced a high number of significant articles, and published three books. His first book, South Africa in Africa: a study in ideology and foreign policy, published in 1975, was his doctoral thesis; this work is considered to be the first major study of South African politics by a black South African. It was followed in 1982 by another work on South African politics, Changing South Africa: political considerations, an analysis of the prospects for non-violent transition to a non-racial society. The study obtained the Johannesburg Sunday Times' Book of the Year Award. His last major work was Limits of anarchy: intervention and state formation in Chad, written in 1996, which examined Chadian modern history with the intention of exploring the dilemmas that involve "fictive states", i.e. countries which have to endure a fitful existence between too much and too little government.
