= Milner Langa Kabane =

South African activist

Milner Langa Kabane GCOB
- Born: 18 June 1900; Butterworth, Cape Colony
- Died: 1945 (aged 44–45); Bloemfontein, Union of South Africa
- Education: University of Fort Hare, Yale University
- Occupations: Educator, journalist, activist
- Known for: Africans' Claims, education reform, anti-apartheid activism
- Spouse: Helena Villa Mgudlwa

Milner Langa Kabane (18 June 1900 – 1945) was a South African teacher, journalist, and anti-apartheid activist. He was one of the early African graduates of the University of Fort Hare and played a prominent role in education, politics, and the African National Congress. In 2017, he was posthumously awarded the Order of the Baobab in Silver by the South African government.

== Early life and education ==
Kabane was born on 18 June 1900 at the Cwecweni Methodist Mission Station near Butterworth in the Eastern Cape. His father, William Kabane, was a Wesleyan minister. He received his early education locally and completed a primary teacher training course at Healdtown Institution in 1918.

In 1920, Kabane qualified to enter the South African Native College (later the University of Fort Hare), where he matriculated in 1922. He graduated in 1925 with a Bachelor of Arts degree and a teaching diploma, becoming one of the first Black South Africans to do so.

== Career ==
Kabane began his professional life as a teacher and later joined the staff of Lovedale College, where he eventually became its first Black principal. He also contributed to the Xhosa-language newspaper, Imvo Zabantsundu, as a journalist and editor.

In the 1930s, Kabane studied abroad at Yale University in the United States, focusing on the Principles of Education and Psychology of Education. Upon returning to South Africa, he taught at the Bloemfontein Bantu High School in the Orange Free State and became increasingly active in political affairs. He lived on the same street as T. M. Mapikela, an influential ANC leader, and was deeply involved in the local African political community.

== Africans' Claims and the Atlantic Charter ==
In December 1943, Kabane was selected as a member of a 28-person committee tasked with responding to the Atlantic Charter from an African perspective. This effort culminated in the drafting of the historic document Africans' Claims in South Africa, which called for full citizenship rights, land redistribution, and equality before the law. Kabane served on the sub-committee responsible for drafting the document, which was unanimously adopted by the ANC's Annual Conference on 16 December 1943.

== Death and legacy ==
Kabane died in Bloemfontein in 1945 at the age of 45. He was survived by his wife, Helena Villa Kabane (née Mgudlwa), and their three children: Temba, Nozipho, and Helen.

In 2017, he was posthumously awarded the Order of the Baobab in Silver for his contributions to education and the struggle for liberation in South Africa.

== National Order of the Baobab ==
In 2017, the current South African government recognised his contribution by awarding him the National Order of the Baobab posthumously, one of the highest in the country. He was awarded "for his excellent contribution to the field of education and the upliftment of the black community during the struggle for liberation."
