= Welcome Duru =

South African actor (1933–2009)

- Born: 1933
- Died: 2009 (aged 75–76)
- Occupation: actor . boxing promoter . composer . musician . politician
- Children: 2

Welcome Duru (1933–2009) was a South African actor, boxing promoter, composer, musician, politician and a socialite, also known as Bra Wel.

== Early life ==
Duru was born in Korsten (Port Elizabeth), South Africa, but due to forced removals grew up in the black African township of New Brighton. In 1952 he started an a cappella group called The Basin Blues, which was the first black African group in Port Elizabeth to record a song in a studio.

In 1958 Duru married Dolly Rathebe, one of South Africa's established blues singers and beauty queen of the 1950s. The couple had two children before their marriage was dissolved after four years.

== Composer ==
Duru composed a number of songs during his lifetime, including uNomeva, Sindy, Sithetha ngeBasin Blues and, most famously, the protest song Wenyuk'uMbombela (The Train Song) recorded by Harry Belafonte and Miriam Makeba on their Grammy Award-winning album An Evening with Belafonte/Makeba (1965), and later by Hugh Masekela.

Duru was incarcerated in Robben Island in 1965. After serving close to five years, he worked with the playwright Gibson Kente on his release. He travelled the country with Kente's group, with productions such as How Long (play) and Sikalo.

Duru died after suffering from a stroke in August 2009.

== Sources ==
- Msila, V. (2010). The Black Train Rising: The Life and Times of Welcome Duru. Lynnwood Ridge: Siyomba.
