= Mzuvukile Tom =

South African soccer player

Personal information
- Full name: Mzuvukile Sydney Tom
- Date of birth: 17 April 1982 (age 44)
- Place of birth: Graaff-Reinet, South Africa
- Height: 1.71 m (5 ft 7 1/2 in)
- Positions: Left-back; left winger

Senior career*
Years	Team	Apps	(Gls)
2006–2007	OR Tambo Cosmos	27	(1)
2007–2014	Golden Arrows	148	(4)
2014–2015	Mpumalanga Black Aces	8	(0)

International career
2011	South Africa	2	(0)
- * Club domestic league appearances and goals

Mzuvukile Tom (born 17 April 1982 in Graaff-Reinet) is a South African football (soccer) defender and midfielder who spent most of his career with Golden Arrows. He was capped twice for South Africa.
