= R.L. Peteni =

South African novelist (1915–2000)

Randall Langa Peteni
- Born: 6 December 1915; Zingcuka, Qoboqobo district, South Africa
- Died: 8 September 2000 (aged 84)
- Occupation: Writer
- Writing career
- Language: Xhosa, English
- Notable work: Hill of Fools

Randall Langa Peteni (6 December 1915 – 8 September 2000) was a Xhosa South African novelist and academic, and author of the novel Hill of Fools (Aba Kwazidenge), which was adapted for television by the SABC. The novel was Peteni's only novel.

== Childhood ==
Peteni was born in Zingcuka in the Qoboqobo district in the former Ciskei, on 6 December 1915.

== Career ==
Peteni graduated with majors in English and Social Anthropology at the University of Fort Hare. Peteni's granddaughter stated that he was friends with Nelson Mandela during this time, and lent Mandela a cap and gown to wear for his graduation.

He taught for a number of years in Heilbron before moving to the then Transvaal, where he became Supervisor of Schools in the Krugersdorp circuit. After experiencing persecution because of his ethnic background, he returned to the Eastern Cape and continued teaching.

He later obtained an honours degree through the University of South Africa (UNISA) and began lecturing English at the University of Fort Hare in 1969.

Peteni wrote his only novel, Hill of Fools, in 1976. It was published in South Africa by David Philip, and internationally by Heineman as part of their African Writers Series. In 1980, it was translated into Xhosa as Kwazidenge, published by Lovedale Press.

In spite of only writing one novel in his sixties, Peteni made a literary impact as author of South Africa's first regional novel in English by a black writer, and first novel in English by a Xhosa speaker. The novel is widely prescribed in school curricula.

Peteni retired from the University of Fort Hare in 1981, moving to the College of Education in Soweto, before becoming Chancellor of the University of Transkei in 1989.

== Death ==
Peteni died aged 84 on 8 September 2000 in East London after a long illness.
