= Ndaba Mtirara =

South African politician and Xhosa traditional leader

Member of the National Assembly
- In office June 1999 – 12 March 2001
- Constituency: Eastern Cape

Personal details
- Born: 30 September 1957 (age 68)
- Citizenship: South Africa
- Party: African National Congress (since 2001)
- Other political affiliations: United Democratic Movement (until 2001)

Ndaba Zwelodumo Mtirara (born 30 September 1957) is a Xhosa traditional leader and former politician. He is a member of the Thembu royal family and represented the United Democratic Movement (UDM) in the National Assembly from 1999 until 2001, when he resigned. He subsequently joined the African National Congress (ANC).

== Legislative career ==
Mtirara was born on 30 September 1957. He gained election to the National Assembly in the 1999 general election, ranked second on the UDM's party list for the Eastern Cape. He resigned from his seat on 12 March 2001, apparently with the UDM's blessing: UDM leader Bantu Holomisa said that Mtirara had asked to leave his position in order to serve as acting King of the abaThembu in the absence of King Buyelekhaya Dalindyebo. However, shortly afterwards, Mtirara joined the rival ANC, which he went on to serve in the Eastern Cape Provincial Legislature.
