= Mbombini Molteno Sihele =

Mbombini Molteno ka Sihele (Mbombini Molteno son of Sihele) was a Xhosa Councillor and warrior, as well as the national poet ("imbongi") and cultural custodian of the abaThembu people of South Africa during the late 19th and early 20th centuries. He gathered and preserved Thembu history and lore from his base at the court of Chief Falo Mgudlwa in Ngcobo and he stewarded the different Thembu royal clans during a fractious and dangerous time.

== Youth ==
Mbombini's father Sihele was powerful warrior of the Thembu nation, who chose to go to war against the British at a time when most other Thembu leaders would not. At his final departure to war, knowing he would not return, he left his children in the hands of Nowisile, the wife of the young Falo Mgudlwa and the daughter of the Gcaleka King Sarili kaHintsa. He instructed that his one son Pafulu was to receive a full European education and that his other son Mbombini was to receive a purely Thembu up-bringing. He explained on his departure that this was to ensure that Mbombini never left his home and his people. After his father's death Mbombini therefore became a servant of Chief Falo Mgudlwa.

== Councillor ==
From his youngest years, the boy was very loyal to his guardian and he became the Chief's most trusted servant.

His intelligence and charisma caused him to rise to position of Councillor and his influence then expanded across Thembuland and further. He was a giant in physical stature and he was famous for bravery and fierceness in war. Nonetheless he could also use great tact and gentleness in order to achieve an important aim. In his private life he used the name Mbombini while in his capacity as Thembu Councillor he used his second name Molteno. Sihele was his father's name and so he also took the patronym "kaSihele" ("son of Sihele"). Molteno believed that divisions and disagreements made the Xhosa speaking nations vulnerable, and his main policies were to use traditional structures and diplomacy to unite the different Chiefs, at a turbulent time in Thembuland due to a series of conflicts with occurred in the region in the later half of the 19th century.

During times when the elderly Chief Falo was suffering from alcoholism and could not lead personally, Molteno took instruction from the Chief and commanded the people in the Chief's name. He implemented the incapacitated leader's instructions during the Second Boer War and he publicly protected and honoured the Chief's name.

On his death bed, Chief Falo instructed Molteno to look after his descendants. The "death-charge" was that Molteno and his descendants would always protect Falo's descendants and their people. Indeed Falo's children quarreled and disputed succession, but Molteno worked for the remainder of his life at resolving these disputes and others. He also spent his life protecting and fighting for Falo's young adopted son Qaqawuli as he was instructed to. The internal and external conflicts called for Molteno's constant work, for the rest of his long life, up until his death.

He died of pneumonia that he contracted in his old age, while riding horseback over great distances in extreme cold still to arrange meetings between local leaders. Even on his deathbed he summoned his children and instructed them to continue the task of uniting the Xhosa-speaking peoples, because he believed that harder times were still to come. He was later honoured as a lifelong guardian and servant of the Thembu and of other people of the region.

== National poet ==
Mbombini Sihele studied old Thembu oral history and lore. He became the "imbongi" (national poet) and spokesperson of the Thembu nation. He assembled and preserved the traditions and history of the Thembu and other Xhosa people. Through this he made the court of Chief Falo into the major repository of history for the Thembu and Qwathi nations. Later chroniclers would spend time there to study this history.

Because Mbombini was illiterate it was only through his contacts, descendants and later national poets that this lore and history and also his own compositions was written down. An example was the history: "Thembu History per Chief Falo Mgudlwa at Qumanco" (18/06/35. McLaughlin Papers, Cory Library, Grahamstown).

He is honoured by the later imbongi, the poet Melikhaya Mbutuma, in his 1963 poem against the Apartheid government and its puppet ruler Kaiser Matanzima:

I remember Mbombini Sihele, a giant with a husky chest,
I remember him calling for his deadly assegai,
I remember him calling for his murderous panga.
He was preparing to fight Qaqawuli’s enemies.
He complained that the household of Phalo was being ruined.
If people could be resurrected, I would resurrect him and embrace him.
