= Nontsizi Mgqwetho =

South African poet

Nontsizi Mgqwetho (fl. 1920s) was a South African poet and political commentator. Writing primarily in isiXhosa, she was one of the earliest female poets in the language, using her work to critique colonialism, racial oppression, and the shifting dynamics of black identity in early 20th-century South Africa.

== Early life and background ==
Little is known about Mgqwetho’s personal life, including her exact birth and death dates. She emerged in the 1920s in the black press, particularly in Umteteli wa Bantu, a Johannesburg-based multilingual weekly newspaper published between 1920 and 1955. The publication was known as The Mouthpiece of the Native People and was printed in English, isiXhosa, isiZulu, and Sesotho, providing a space for political discussions among black South Africans.

== Umteteli wa Bantu ==
Umteteli wa Bantu (translated as The Mouthpiece of the Native People) was a Johannesburg-based weekly newspaper published between 1920 and 1955. Printed in English, isiXhosa, isiZulu, and Sesotho, it served as an important platform for Black intellectual and political discourse in South Africa. The newspaper provided space for writers like Nontsizi Mgqwetho, whose poetry was regularly featured, allowing her to challenge colonial rule, advocate for Black rights, and critique political leadership.

== Works ==
Mgqwetho’s poetry was originally published in Umteteli wa Bantu between 1920 and 1929. Decades later, her work was rediscovered and compiled into a comprehensive collection:

- The Nation’s Bounty: The Xhosa Poetry of Nontsizi Mgqwetho – Edited and translated by Jeff Opland, published by Wits University Press in 2007. This compilation includes her poetry alongside scholarly analysis of her contributions to isiXhosa literature and South African political discourse.
