= Maxwell Mlilo =

South African actor

- Born: Mqanduli, Eastern Cape, South Africa
- Occupation: actor

Maxwell Mlilo (1960–2006) born in Mqanduli, was a South African actor who acted as Ngconde, Tshawe's relative in Emzini Wezinsizwa and also acted in dramas in Tshatsha.
