= Sabelo Phama =

South African revolutionary (1949 – 1994)

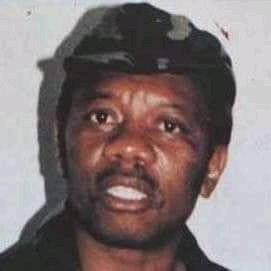
- Born: Sabelo Gqweta; 31 March 1949; Mthatha, Cape Province, Union of South Africa
- Died: 9 February 1994 (aged 44); Morogoro, Tanzania
- Other name: Victor
- Occupation: Military commander

Sabelo Phama [born Sabelo Gqwetha] (31 March 1949 – 9 February 1994) was a political activist, military commander of the Azanian People's Liberation Army and Secretary for Defense of the Pan African Congress.

== Early life ==
Sabelo Phama was born in the Eastern Cape, Mthatha, South Africa. He was born in Baziya, a rural area on the outskirts of Mthatha. He was the son of Cyril Thozama Gqwetha and Thembani (Nee Mlambo) Gqwetha.The greater part of his childhood he spent with his grandparents who were teachers by profession. Sabelo started his primary education at Baziya Mission School at the age of six in 1955. Sabelo was in contact with the PAC underground leaders at the ages of 12 and 13, and was putting pressure on the branch and cell leaders to go to Lesotho for the acquisition of the revolutionary theory. According to the PAC's task force of the early 1960s, the 1963 target date for the great offensive and liberation was emotionally and fanatically looked forward to by the "Africanist" youth.

He completed his primary and his secondary at Elliot and Cala, respectively. He was rejected and expelled, in 1959 and 1967, at St John's College, in Umthatha. He studied for his matriculation certificate at a newly formed Ngangelizwe high school In Umthatha. After completing his high school education, Sabelo went to work for a year and later to university. In 1970 he worked and studied part-time at the University of Witwatersrand's, where his later uncle, Sipho Gqweta, was working in the department of Botany.

From 1971 to 1973 he studied for a Bachelor of Arts degree at the University of Fort Hare, Alice, where he helped organize PAC structures on campus. Sabelo Phama enjoyed studying philosophy, a course which others considered difficult. He was an active member of the rugby executive that pioneered the establishment of the progressive South African Rugby Union in many parts of the country. He was expelled in September 1973 because of his participation in a student's strike.

== Career ==
After his expulsion from Fort Hare, he worked as a clerk in the interior department in Umthatha. While working, he enrolled into the University of South Africa to complete his senior degree program. After he paid for lectures and books he received a letter informing him that he was banned from studying in any university in SA for two years. He was under constant security police surveillance. Within a year in 1974, he resigned from the department of the interior and worked for TDC Wholesalers at Thembalethu. Sabelo was appointed as a PAC inter-regional coordinator. Sabelo had to travel more often to Transvaal, Natal and Botswana.

After the independence of Mozambique, a directive from the late T M Ntantala, Mothopeng and Maboza visited PAC underground structures, saying that cadres were required externally for various training programmers and duties. Sabelo was among the first group that left for Tanzania in 1975. From June to August 1975 he went for a party and army building course in China. Because of his interest in military activities rather than diplomatic work, he later led a platoon of cadres to China for military training. His basic infantry training was in Tanzania and later China. In 1976 he later came to South Africa with a late Azanian people's liberation army commander, Eddie Phiri (Lancelot Dube), with 25 APLA cadres; he was in a platoon of mainly commissars and intelligent units. Their mission was to prepare for an underground structure for the absorption of externally trained cadres and gradual integration of PAC's liberation struggle. This was termed "Operation Curtain Raiser"

When the late Chairman, John Nyathi Pokela took over as leader of the PAC, He instructed many comrades to strengthen the external headquarters, Sabelo Phama was among them. He became one of APLA leaders and later, in December 1981, he (Sabelo) was appointed as Secretary for Defence, as well as the commander of APLA. As commander of APLA and Secretary for Defence, he visited many countries for his orientation and upgrading, including Yugoslavia, China, Libya and Uganda.

Under Sabelo Phama APLA's campaign gain momentum and captured the imaginations of popular media. intermittent reports and analysis began to appear in prominent pages and editorials. APLA was engaged in skirmishes with SADF along the borders and in the townships. APLA continued to engage in exchange of fire with the police and the army which included conflicts in Lichtenburg, Port Elizabeth, East London, Pietermaritzburg, Bloemfontein and other areas.

=== 1993 attacks on civilian targets ===
In 1993, as APLA's chief commander, Phama declared that he "would aim his guns at children "to hurt whites where it hurts most". Phama proclaimed 1993 as "The Year of the Great Storm" and sanctioned the attacks on civilians, including:

- King William’s Town Golf Club on 28 November 1992, in which four were killed.
- Saint James Church massacre in Kenilworth on 25 July 1993, killing 11 people during a church service.
- Heidelberg Tavern Massacre in Observatory on 31 December 1993, killing four.
- Mdantsane on 11 March 1994, killing three Iranians. APLA took responsibility for the attacks, stating that: "The men were shot to show there is no role in the new South Africa for any one of the race that invented apartheid or suppressed the black masses."

In total thirty-two applications were received for attacks on civilians. In these incidents, 24 people were killed and 122 seriously injured.

The Truth and Reconciliation Commission has presently charged that PAC-sanctioned action directed towards white South Africans were "gross violations of human rights for which the PAC and APLA leadership are held to be morally and politically responsible and accountable".

== Death ==
On 9 February 1994, Phama died in a car crash in Morogoro, approximately 200 kilometres west of Dar es Salaam in Tanzania, while en route to South Africa via Zimbabwe. The car in which he had been travelling reportedly rammed a stationary truck, instantly killing Phama. His funeral was held in his home Baziya. He was survived by his parents, his wife Dudu, and two sons.
