= Thozamile Taki =

South African serial killer

- Born: Thozamile Taki; 1971 (age 54–55); Majola, Port St. Johns, South Africa
- Other name: "The Sugarcane Killer"
- Convictions: Murder; Armed robbery
- Penalty: 13 life sentences (208 years for armed robbery)

Details
- Victims: 13
- Country: South Africa
- Date apprehended: 2007

Thozamile Taki (born 1971), known as The Sugarcane Killer, is a South African serial killer who killed 13 women aged 18–25, dumping their bodies in agricultural plantations. On 19 January 2011, Taki was sentenced to 13 life sentences for the murders and an additional 208 years, 16 years for each of his victims of armed robbery.

Taki murdered 10 victims in the sugarcane plantations around the town of Umzinto in the South Coast of KwaZulu-Natal as well as a further three victims in the tea plantations near Port St. Johns in the Eastern Cape. Body parts of some of his victims are alleged to have been provided to a local traditional healer or sangoma.

Taki was remanded at Westville Prison during his trial. On 21 February 2010, Taki, along with eight other prisoners, attempted to escape from the prison. Taki fell from the roof of his fourth-floor cell, seriously injuring himself while his accomplices successfully escaped. His trial was adjourned pending his recovery.

On 2 March 2010, Taki, now using a wheelchair, entered court requesting that his girlfriend be given bail. Judge King Ndlovu postponed the trial until 30 April 2010, during which the remaining eight of the state's 103 witnesses were to testify. On 23 December 2010, Taki was convicted on all charges.

== See also ==
- List of serial killers in South Africa
- List of serial killers by number of victims
