= Dumile Feni =

South African contemporary visual artist (1942–1991)

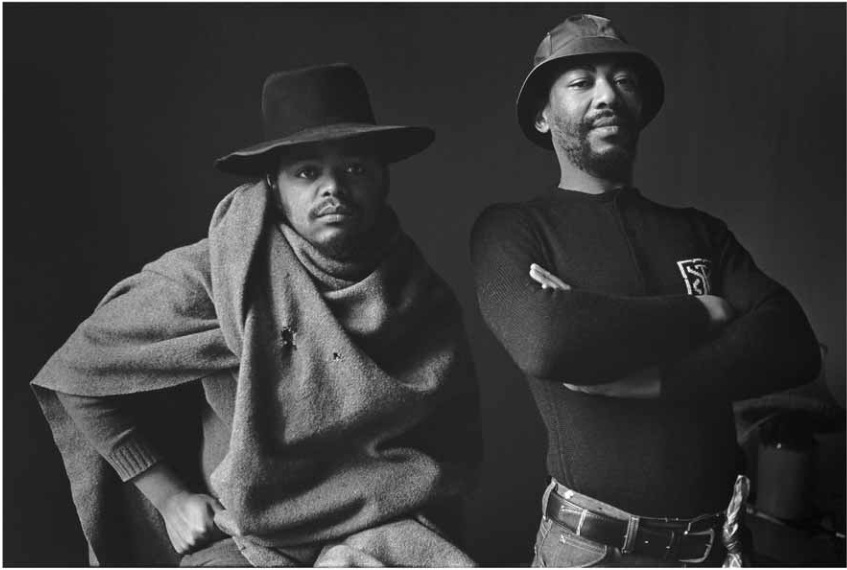
- Feni (left) and jazz drummer Louis Moholo in 1971
- Born: Zwelidumile Geelboi Mgxaji Mslaba Feni; May 21, 1942; Withuis, Worcester, South Africa
- Died: October 16, 1991 (aged 49); New York City, U.S.
- Burial place: Lenasia, South Africa
- Occupation: Artist
- Children: 1

Zwelidumile Geelboi Mgxaji Mhlaba "Dumile" Feni (May 21, 1942 – October 16, 1991) was a South African contemporary visual artist known for both his drawings and paintings that included sculptural elements, as well as for his sculptures, which often depicted the struggle against Apartheid in South Africa. Feni lived in exile and extreme poverty for most of his art career.

== Early life ==
Feni was born in the small farmstead of Withuis in Worcester, Cape Province, South Africa, to parents Geelbooi Magoqwana, a trader and evangelist, and Bettie Nothemba Mgxaji, a business woman. When he was young, Feni's family relocated to the Welcome Estate in Cape Town. His family were Xhosa people.

== Career ==
Composition for a Memoriam (1969) in the exhibition Afro-Atlantic Histories at the National Gallery of Art, Washington, DC, in 2022

Feni's work often tied to the period of Apartheid in South Africa. He lived in self-imposed exile from 1968 to 1991 based between London, Los Angeles and New York.

He moved to the United States in 1978. He was an artist in residence at the Institute of African Humanities in Los Angeles, at the University of California.

According to Dr Amitabh Mitra: "The common man in present day South Africa is largely unaware of Dumile Feni's work and the Contemporary South African Art movement touts him as a 'Goya of Townships'. Dumile Feni represented much more than that."

In 2026, Feni's Apartheid-era pencil and charcoal mural African Guernica, described by The Guardian as an "unnerving juxtaposition of man and beast, light and dark, and innocence and cruelty", was exhibited at Madrid's Museo Nacional Centro de Arte Reina Sofía alongside its namesake, the first time it had been displayed outside of South Africa.

== Documentary ==
In 2010, a documentary called Zwelidumile was released. It was created by South African filmmaker Ramadan Suleman.

== Personal life ==
Feni's first name, Zwelidumile, means "a person known all over the country."

Feni died in New York on 16 October 1991.

Feni has a daughter named Marriam Diale.

== Exhibitions ==
=== Solo exhibitions ===
- 1965: Transvaal Academy, Johannesburg, South Africa
- 1966: Durban Art Gallery, Durban, South Africa
- 1966: Gallery 101, Johannesburg, South Africa
- 1966: Johannesburg Civic Theatre, Johannesburg, South Africa
- 1966: Pretoria Art Museum, Pretoria, South Africa
- 1966: Republic Festival Exhibition, Pretoria, South Africa
- 1966: SA Breweries Art Prize Exhibition, toured South Africa
- 1966: Trans-Natal, Natal Society for Arts, Durban, South Africa
- 1967: Gallery 101, Johannesburg, South Africa
- 1967: Transvaal Academy, Johannesburg, South Africa
- 1968: Sketches from a Private Collection, Goodman Gallery
- 1969: Grosvenor Gallery, London, United Kingdom
- 1970: Exhibition from the Collection of Desmond Fisher, Goodman Gallery
- 1970: The 51 Club Winter Art Exhibition, Goodman Gallery
- 1975: South African Sculpture, Goodman Gallery
- 1981: Black Art Today, Jabulani Standard Bank, Soweto
- 1988: La Galleria, New York, NY
- 1989: Portrait of Nelson Mandela for the Pathfinder Mural, New York, NY
- 1990: Township Art from South Africa, Applecrest, New York, NY
- 1991: Standard Bank National Arts Festival, Grahamstown, South Africa
- 2010: Art on Paper, MOMO Art Gallery, South Africa

=== Group exhibitions ===
- 1966: Artists of Fame and Promise, Adler Fielding Galleries, Johannesburg, South Africa
- 1967: São Paulo Art Biennial, Brazil
- 1967: Sculpture South Africa, 1900: 1967, Adler Fielding Galleries, Johannesburg, South Africa
- 1969: Contemporary African Art, Camden Arts Centre, London, United Kingdom
- 1971: Gallery 101, Johannesburg, South Africa
- 1972: Gallery 101, Johannesburg, South Africa
- 1975: African Art from South Africa, Gallery 21, London, United Kingdom
- 1977: Contemporary African Art in South Africa, Rand Afrikaans University, Pretoria Art Museum, University of Orange Free State, William Hamphrey Art Gallery (University of Fort Hare)
- 1977: SANG (Cape Town Festival), Gallery 21, South Africa
- 1982: Art towards Social Development: an Exhibition of South African Art, National Museum and Art Gallery, Gaborone, Botswana
- 1983: United Nations Exhibition, Commemoration of Namibia Freedom Day, New York, NY
- 1987: Unlock Apartheid's Jails, conference on children under apartheid, with Bill Cosby and the American Committee of Africa, Hyatt Hotel, New York, NY
- 1988: Uhuru: an Exhibition of African American Art against Apartheid, City without Wall Gallery, Newark, NJ
- 1988: Voices from Exile (Seven South African Artists), Washington, DC; Los Angeles, CA; Houston, TX; Philadelphia, PA
- 2010: MOMO Art Gallery, South Africa

== Awards ==
- 2003: Order of Ikhamanga in Gold, for excellence in the arts

== Selected works and publications ==
- Feni, Dumile, and Bruce Smith. Dumile: Artist in Exile, South Africa: Bruce Smith in association with Art on Paper, 2004. ISBN 978-0-620-32860-9 OCLC 57398581
