= Asavela Mbekile =

South African soccer player

Personal information
- Full name: Asavela Shakespeare Mbekile
- Date of birth: 1 November 1986 (age 40)
- Place of birth: Cape Town, South Africa
- Height: 1.73 m (5 ft 8 in)
- Position: Central midfielder

Senior career*
Years	Team	Apps	(Gls)
2009–2011	Ikapa Sporting		
2011–2012	FC Cape Town		
2012–2013	Chippa United	7	(0)
2013–2014	Moroka Swallows	24	(0)
2014–2018	Mamelodi Sundowns	31	(1)
2018–2020	Orlando Pirates	10	(0)
2020–2021	Stellenbosch	20	(0)

International career
2014–2017	South Africa	4	(0)
- * Club domestic league appearances and goals

Asavela Shakespeare Mbekile (born 1 November 1986) is a South African former soccer player who played as a central midfielder.

== Career ==
Born in Cape Town, Mbekile has played club football for Ikapa Sporting, FC Cape Town, Chippa United, Moroka Swallows, Mamelodi Sundowns, Orlando Pirates and Stellenbosch.

He made his international debut for South Africa in 2014.
