= Akhumzi Jezile =

South African actor, TV presenter and producer (1989–2018)

- Born: 15 January 1989; Mthatha, South Africa
- Died: 28 April 2018 (aged 29); Jamestown, South Africa
- Burial place: West Park Cemetery, Johannesburg, South Africa
- Occupations: actor, television presenter, and producer
- Years active: 2007–2018

Akhumzi Jezile (15 January 1989 – 28 April 2018) born in Ngcobo, was a South African actor, television presenter and producer. He is best known for being a presenter on the SABC 1 television show, YOTV and an actor in the SABC 1 drama series Tempy Pushas and as "Ngulube" in Themby Phishers. In 2014, he won the SAFTA award for Best Supporting Actor in a TV Drama for this role.

He died in a car accident together with Siyasanga Kobese and other two friends, between Maletswai and Komani on his way to Ngcobo to bury his grandmother.

== Early life ==
He was born 12 January 1989 and raised in Eastern Cape, Mthatha later on his family has moved to live in Johannesburg. Akhumuzi is the first born in a family of five children. His father died when he was still a young boy and he raised by his mother, Zoleka Jezile. He attended Winile Secondary School located in Katlehong .

== Career ==
From 2016 to 2018, he was the host of SABC 1 show Fan Base season 4.

== Awards and nominations ==
He received the Golden Horn Award for being the best supporting actor in Tempy Pushas in 2014.

== Death ==
Akhumuzi died in a car crash with his three friends including Thobani Mseleni and Siyasanga Kobese in Aliwal North near Komani. He was laid to rest in West Park Cemetery in Johannesburg
