= Lundi Xhongo =

South African cricketer

Personal information
- Full name: Lundi Xhanti Xhongo
- Born: 2 July 1983 (age 43); Cape Town, Cape Province, South Africa
- Batting: Right-handed
- Bowling: Right-arm fast-medium
- Role: Bowler

Domestic team information
- Years: Team
- 2004: Western Province

Career statistics
| Competition | FC | LA |
|---|---|---|
| Matches | 1 | 1 |
| Runs scored | n/a | 1 |
| Batting average | n/a | 1.00 |
| 100s/50s | n/a | 0/0 |
| Top score | n/a | 1 |
| Balls bowled | 42 | 30 |
| Wickets | 0 | 0 |
| Bowling average | n/a | n/a |
| 5 wickets in innings | 0 | 0 |
| 10 wickets in match | 0 | n/a |
| Best bowling | 0/11 | 0/30 |
| Catches/stumpings | 0/– | 0/– |
- Source: CricketArchive, 14 December 2014

Lundi Xhanti Xhongo (born 2 July 1983) is a former South African cricketer who played at first-class and limited overs level for Western Province during the 2004–05 season.

A fast bowler from Cape Town, Xhongo played under-19s representative matches for Western Province, and was also selected for a Western Province Invitation XI against the touring Dutch national side, aged 20. He made his first-class debut for Western Province in October 2004, against North West in the three-day UCB Provincial Cup, in what was to be his only first-class game. Xhongo played little part in the match, which Western Province won by an innings and 80 runs – he failed to bat, but effected a run out in North West's second innings, in which he went wicketless in seven overs opening the bowling with Quinton Friend. Achmat Magiet also debuted for Western Province in that match, while Frikkie Holtzhausen debuted for North West.

Xhongo played his only limited-overs match for Western Province in the corresponding one-day fixture against North West, played the day after the conclusion of the three-day fixture. He again went wicketless in that match, conceding 30 runs from five overs. Outside of South African domestic matches, Xhongo also played club cricket for several English sides. He spent the 2002 season with Sidmouth in the Devon Cricket League, and the 2003 and 2005 seasons with Milnrow in the Central Lancashire League,
