= Jet Novuka =

South African actor

- Born: 3 March 1971 (age 55); Mthatha, South Africa
- Occupations: Actor, Director, Content Creator
- Years active: 1990–present

Jet Novuka (born 3 March 1971) is a South African actor.

He is known for his roles in South African television shows such as Home Affairs, Igazi, "Yizo Yizo", Mfolozi Street, Isidingo: The Need, Jacob’s Cross, and Letters of Hope.

== Early life ==
Novuka was born and raised in Mthatha's Ngangelizwe township on 3 March 1971, the same township South African DJ Black Coffee grew up in. A pupil that only went to school for acting, he graduated from Fuba School of Drama & Visual Arts and also received training at Funda Arts Centre. His acting career took off when he was cast in the 1990 film, "The King's Mesenger". Novuka is also one of South Africa's leading film producers.

== Television ==
Series:

- Home Affairs,
- Igazi,
- Mfolozi Street,
- Isidingo:
- The Need,
- Jacob’s Cross,
- Letters of Hope.
- 4Play: Sex Tips for Girls
- Ingozi
- Montana
- MTV Shuga
- Ngempela
- Nkululeko
- Soul Buddyz
- The River as Walter
- Tsha Tsha
- Usindiso
- Yizo Yizo
- Zero Tolerance
- Zone 14
- uZalo

== Awards ==
He won the Rapid Lion 2020 - Best Actor in a Supporting Role for his role in Letters of Hope award.
