= Siyabonga Nontshinga =

South African soccer player

Personal information
- Full name: Elliot Siyabonga Nontshinga
- Date of birth: 4 February 1987 (age 39)
- Place of birth: Port Elizabeth, South Africa
- Position: Striker

Senior career*
Years	Team	Apps	(Gls)
2008–2011	Bay United	28	(8)
2011–2012	Jomo Cosmos	25	(4)
2012–2013	Bloemfontein Celtic	10	(1)
2013	→ Mpumalanga Black Aces (loan)	14	(6)
2013–2014	FC Buffalo		
2014–2015	Roses United		
2015–2016	Santos	3	(0)

International career^{‡}
2011–2012	South Africa	3	(0)
- * Club domestic league appearances and goals as of 09:38, 18 March 2017 (UTC) ‡ National team caps and goals as of 09:38, 18 March 2017 (UTC)

Elliot Siyabonga Nontshinga (born 4 February 1987) is a South African international footballer who plays as a striker.

== Club career ==
Born in Port Elizabeth, Nontshinga has played for Bay United, Jomo Cosmos, Bloemfontein Celtic, Mpumalanga Black Aces, FC Buffalo, Roses United and Santos.

== International career ==
Nontshinga received his first call-up to the South African national team in November 2011, which he dedicated to the memory of his mother.

He made his national team debut for South Africa in 2011, earning three caps between then and 2012.
