= Andile Ngcaba =

South African businessman (born 1956)

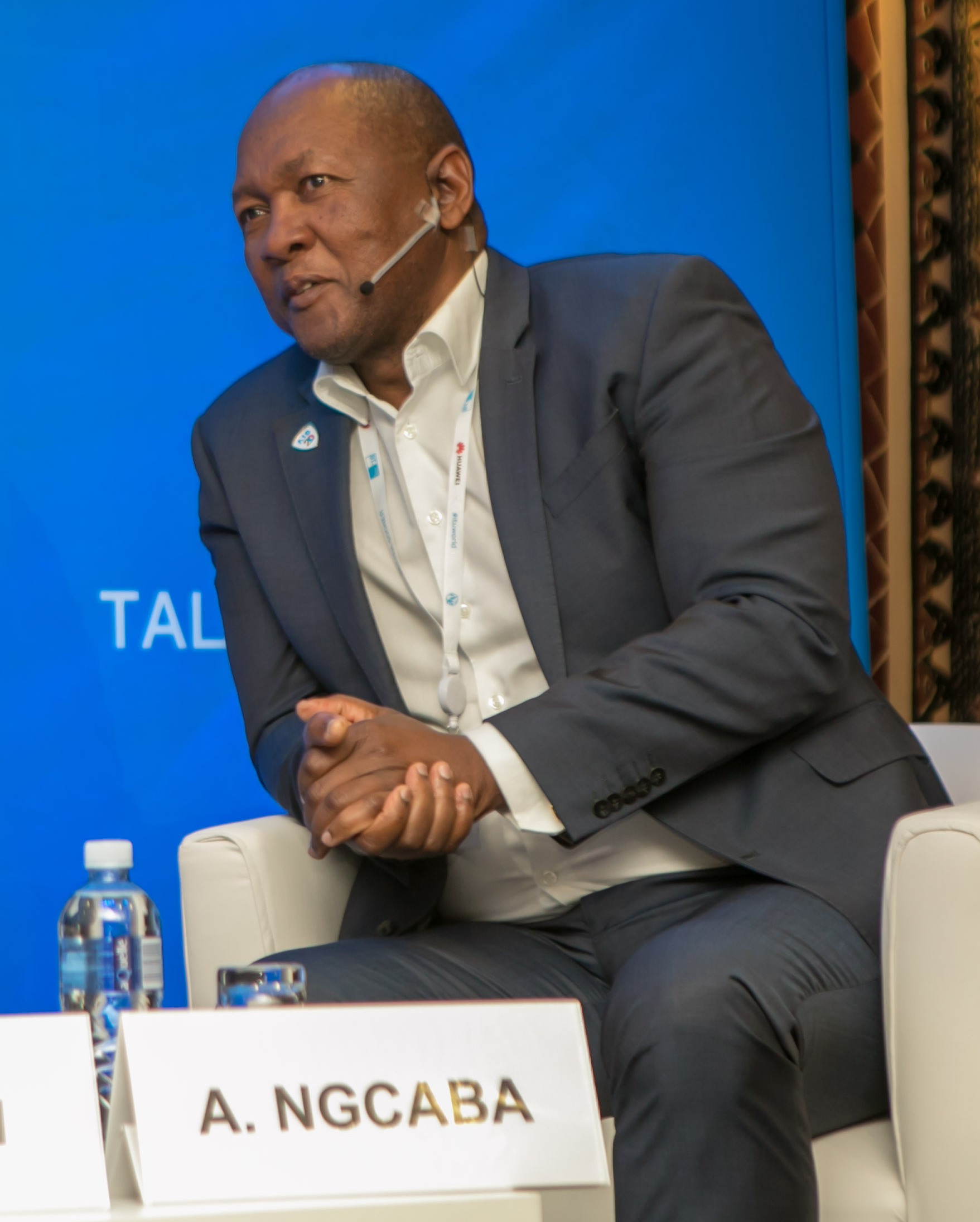
- Ngcaba at the Forum Sumit in 2018
- Born: 12 December 1956 (age 69); Duncan Village, East London, South Africa
- Occupations: Anti-apartheid activist, businessperson
- Known for: Supporting new communications infrastructure projects across Africa
- Spouse: Svieta Ngcaba
- Children: 5

Andile Abner Ngcaba is a South African businessman who has devoted most of his life and career to the field of technology, in particular communications. He is chairman, founder and majority shareholder of the investment group Convergence Partners and is also the former Executive Chairman of Dimension Data Middle East and Africa.

Through Convergence Partners, Ngcaba was also involved in significant new communications infrastructure projects across Africa. This included Seacom, the first undersea fibre optic cable system serving Africa's East Coast, which came into service on 23 July 2009. The first private sector satellite in Africa, Intelsat New Dawn, which was launched on 22 April 2011. A joint venture to bring high capacity, long-haul terrestrial fibre to South Africa (FibreCo) and a new joint venture with Google to invest in CSquared, a broadband infrastructure company headquartered in Nairobi, Kenya.

Ngcaba was previously an activist aligned with the African National Congress during the struggle against apartheid, and thereafter the Director General of Communications in the first democratically elected government of South Africa in 1994. He left Government in 2003 to pursue a career in the private sector. Ngcaba currently lives in both Johannesburg and Mountain View, California.

== Early life and education ==
Born on 12 June 1956, in Duncan Village, East London (Eastern Cape Province), Ngcaba's interest in technology dates back to his childhood when he would accompany his father to work. His father spent 38 years working for the Post Office, 20 years of which he was a Postmaster. There Ngcaba met technicians and engineers and was exposed to what at the time was advanced communications technology at the Post Office, which at the time also ran South Africa's telecom networks (prior to being spun off into Telkom in the early 1990s). When he completed high school, Ngcaba enrolled at a technical college in Umtata before being hired as a bench technician by Philips in Johannesburg. There he worked with medical and telecom equipment and other scientific instrumentation.

== Apartheid years ==
During the political turmoil in the late 1970s in South Africa, Ngcaba involved himself with the African National Congress underground, and actively took part in and helped plan insurgency operations. Ngcaba transited through Mozambique before joining ANC camps in Angola, where he underwent formal military training. He was trained in military communications technology before going to the then Soviet Union, where he received further specialised training. There he studied in fields of military radio, radar, reconnaissance and surveillance technologies.

Ngcaba spent most of the 1980s moving between Europe, the Soviet Union and parts of Africa, with the bulk of his time being spent in Angola. In 1990, after more than a decade of struggle, Ngcaba was among the first exiles to return to South Africa. He helped the ANC establish its Johannesburg headquarters and was soon appointed as the organisation's head of IT.

Ngcaba was responsible for the establishment of the Centre for Development of Information and Telecommunications Policy which was instrumental in:

- Training and skills development of historically disadvantaged South Africans in the ICT sector, providing training both at local and international institutions and producing a large number of the current senior ICT executives in South Africa
- Hosting and facilitating international and African telecommunications seminars and conferences that shaped the telecommunications landscape on the African Continent
- The establishment of the National Telecommunications Forum in South Africa, a body that brought together all ICT stakeholders outside of Government in the period leading up to the 1994 elections

== Government ==
On his return to South Africa after exile, Ngcaba continued his contribution to the ICT sector by participating in various initiatives that positively shaped the ICT sector both in South Africa and in the region. These included working with and serving on structures of the ITU, the global policy development and standards-making body.

Soon after South Africa transitioned to a democracy, Ngcaba took up the position of Director General of the Department of Communications for eight and half years until December 2003, during which time he worked under ministers Pallo Jordan, Jay Naidoo and the late Ivy Matsepe-Casaburri. While he was Director General of the Department of Communications he participated in international organisations such as the Office of Outer Space Affairs in Vienna and the Internet Corporation for Assigned Names and Numbers (ICANN).

At the Department of Communications, Ngcaba was responsible for policy formulation that restructured the ICT sector and presided over various groundbreaking initiatives designed to reorganise and overhaul the telecommunications sector, broadcasting industry, postal services and e-commerce in accordance with the imperatives of the new South African society. During this time more than 10 pieces of legislation were produced, including the Convergence Bill, which was subsequently promulgated as the Electronics Communications Act of 2006.

While he was Director General, Ngcaba founded of the Institute for Software and Satellite Applications (ISSA) and the National Electronic Media Institute of South Africa (NEMISA). He participated in the Digital Opportunity Task Force (DOTFORCE), a G8 ICT global initiative. There he helped to shape various policy initiatives that have served as a platform for the development of ICT in Africa, with specific emphasis on regulatory and policy initiatives for the establishment of independent regulatory institutions, promotion of good governance, liberalisation of the market, privatisation, introduction of competition and building of infrastructure.

== Private Sector ==
Ngcaba resigned from his role as Director General in 2003 to pursue a career in the private sector.

In September 2004, Ngcaba led a Broad-Based BEE Consortium that acquired a 25% stake in Dimension Data Middle East and Africa, later becoming Executive chairman. After Thintana (the former Strategic Equity Partner to Telkom, comprising SBC Communications and Telekom Malaysia) divested half of its 15% stake in Telkom and announced its intention to sell its remaining interest, Ngcaba assisted in putting together the Elephant Consortium to acquire the shares. In May 2005, the Elephant Consortium, comprising private investors, industry players, sponsors, seed capital providers and more than 30% broad-based beneficiaries (groups representing interests of women, disabled and youth), acquired 6.7% of Telkom in a commercially funded structure, which ran to term in May 2010. Ngcaba invested in a further 2 companies before the formation of Convergence Partners in early 2006 as his exclusive investment vehicle.

Convergence Partners has to date invested in 16 companies in the technology, media and telecommunications sector across the African continent and is an active, value-adding shareholder with a long-term investment horizon. Through Convergence Partners, Ngcaba continues to pursue his vision of a connected Africa. In this regard, Ngcaba played pivotal roles in several landmark transactions to bring critical connectivity to the continent, notably Seacom, the first East African undersea cable, and the New Dawn Satellite joint venture, which was launched in April 2011.

Ngcaba currently serves on a number of boards of investee companies and is a Trustee of the Convergence Partners Foundation Trust, a not-for-profit vehicle to improve the education of previously disadvantaged persons using technology and to develop ICT skills that are in short supply in the continent.

== Other Positions ==
Ngcaba has served on the Council of the University of South Africa (UNISA) and was an advisor to the Digital Inclusion Programme at Harvard University Law School. He also was a member of the Telecom Board of the ITU, served on the Board of InfoDev, a partnership of international developmental agencies, which was in turn co-ordinated and served by an expert Secretariat housed at the World Bank.

Ngcaba was the Honorary Advisor representing Africa for The Prince of Wales International Business Leaders Forum (IBLF), advising on strategy and engagement throughout Africa. Since 2002 he has played a pivotal role in the establishment of IT and education initiatives in South Africa by the IBLF and in engagement in other African countries.

== Recognition ==
Ngcaba has written and published many papers, received various international awards, participated globally on ICT decision-making forums and has influenced the formation of various African forums and organisations responsible for shaping the ICT sector.

He has been a leading proponent of the implementation of various measures designed to curb the digital divide and his efforts have won him praise including a Lifetime Achievement Award in 2003.

In 1993 he was awarded the Best Computer Person of the Year by the Computer Society of SA.

He was also conferred the Black Information Technology Achievers award and the ICT Leadership Award.

Ngcaba was named as TechCentral's newsmaker of 2011 for his significant impact on South Africa's technology sector.

== Personal life ==
Ngcaba grew up in a family consisting of four brothers and a sister, most of whom have also ended up in the ICT industry, in Duncan Village, East London. His family is originally from Pondoland in the Eastern Cape.

Ngcaba is married to Dr. Svieta Ngcaba, a medical doctor by profession, and has five children Linda Ngcaba, Khusela Ngcaba, Anda Ngcaba, Afezekile Ngcaba and Ayabulela Ngcaba
