= Bulelani Mabhayi =

South African serial killer and rapist

- Born: 1974 (age 51–52); South Africa
- Other name: "The Monster of Tholeni"
- Conviction: Murder
- Penalty: 25 years to life imprisonment

Details
- Victims: 20
- Span of crimes: 2007–2012
- Country: South Africa
- State: Eastern Cape

Bulelani Mabhayi (born 1974), known as The Monster of Tholeni, is a South African serial killer and rapist who has been sentenced for the murder of 20 people.

== Murders and sentence ==
From May 2007 to August 11, 2012, Mabhayi killed 10 women and 9 children in the village of Tholeni in the Eastern Cape. A woman from another town was also murdered. He broke into houses at night, where there were no men. He would then rape some of his victims and then kill them with an axe or panga.

His youngest victim was 14 months old and his eldest was 79 years old.

On May 17, 2010, Mabhayi and other local men over 16 years were tested and their fingerprints were taken. Mabhayi's fingerprints could not be taken because he had no identification with him. He was eventually caught when he left a shoe at a crime scene. The saliva sample taken in 2010 was crucial for identification.

Mabhayi was found guilty of 20 counts of murder, 6 of rape and 10 of burglary. He was sentenced on September 3, 2013, from 25 years to life imprisonment.

== See also ==
- List of serial killers in South Africa
- List of serial killers by number of victims
