= Nicholas Lungisa Ncama =

South African serial killer (born 1968)

Nicholas ‘Ponky’ Ncama
- Born: Nicholas Lungisa Ncama c. 1968; Port Elizabeth, South Africa
- Penalty: Life sentence, effectively 42 years

Details
- Victims: 6
- Span of crimes: May – October 1997
- Country: South Africa
- Date apprehended: November 1997

Nicholas Lungisa Ncama is a South African serial killer who was convicted in 1997 of three murders and sentenced to life in prison. His victims all came from the Port Elizabeth area of the Eastern Cape.

== Criminal activity ==
Ncama raped and strangled his victims, some of whom were related to notable personalities in the Eastern Cape. His first victim was a local policewoman, Constable Luyanda Ngcizela (21) whom he strangled with electrical wire. Her body was found at a bus stop in Empa, near Mthatha on 28 May 1997.

Ncama went on to murder provincial legislature secretary Nompumelelo Mpushe (26) on 1 June 1997. Her body was found near Fort Jackson. His next victim was Cynthia Ndlaku, the wife of a Port Elizabeth Methodist minister, followed by the murder of Prasella Dayal (41), and her daughter, Rishmi (5), both of East London. His last murder was that of his step-daughter Sonia Zanto (15) who was raped and strangled and left semi-naked in an empty room in KwaZakhele in October 1997.

== Arrest and conviction ==
Ncama was arrested in November 1997, but succeeded in escaping from police custody on 3 April 1998. Ncama, a martial arts enthusiast, had been directing police to various criminal exhibits in a house when he escaped.

He was sentenced in Grahamstown on 17 December 1998 to life imprisonment and an effective 42 years in jail. Ncama was ultimately convicted on three counts of murder (Ngcizela, Mpushe & Zanto), one count of rape, one count of indecent assault (Zanto) and one count of attempted rape.

== See also ==
- List of serial killers in South Africa
