= Moses Twebe =

South African politician

Moses Bonisile Twebe (1916–2013) was a South African politician who was a member of the ANC. He was born in King William's Town and was a close friend to Govan Mbeki. He was imprisoned on Robben Island and afterwards banished to Dimbaza.
