= Sinethemba Jantjie =

South African soccer player (1989–2019)

Personal information
- Date of birth: 15 February 1989
- Place of birth: Whittlesea, South Africa
- Date of death: 1 April 2019 (aged 30)
- Place of death: Bethlehem, South Africa
- Position: Winger

Senior career*
Years	Team	Apps	(Gls)
2015–2016	Mbombela United	12	(3)
2016–2019	Free State Stars	63	(8)
Total		75	(11)
- * Club domestic league appearances and goals

Sinethemba Jantjie (15 February 1989 – 1 April 2019) was a South African professional soccer player who played for Mbombela United and Free State Stars as a winger.

== Early and personal life ==
Jantjie came from Whittlesea.

== Career ==
Jantjie was described as a "late bloomer who rose to prominence in the 2015/16 season with Mbombela United when he helped take the club close to promotion to the Premier League". During that season he scored 3 goals in 12 league games. He then moved to Free State Stars for the 2016–17 season, scoring 8 goals in 63 league games during his 3 seasons with the club. He was due to sign for Bidvest Wits ahead of the 2019–20 season. Following his death, Bidvest Wits declared his contract "null and void".

== Death ==
Jantjie died in a road accident in Bethlehem on 1 April 2019, aged 30. He was buried on 6 April 2019. At his funeral the Free State Stars players said they would dedicate the remaining games to Jantjie's memory.

Following his death, Free State Stars' next match was postponed for his funeral, whilst the PSL said their forthcoming fixtures would observe a minute's silence.
