= John Gomomo =

South African unionist and activist

Phumzile John Gomomo (25 October 1945 – 22 January 2008) was a South African unionist and activist.

== Background and career ==
Phumzile John Gomomo was born on a farm in Adelaide on 25 October 1945, one of seven children born to the late Ndabeni (Mnzotho) and Nonga Stofile (Mpondo). He received his primary education from Ntlaka Lower Primary School and Marry Mount High School. He left school in standard 6 (grade 8) because of family poverty, and subsequently completed his matriculation through correspondence courses. Gomomo held a number of factory jobs in Uitenhage. In 1977, he joined the United Auto Workers' Union, which later merged with other unions to become the National Automobile and Allied Workers' Union (NAAWU).

He was working at Volkswagen as a welder when he became chairperson of the factory's shop stewards committee, leading strikes there in 1980 and 1982. He was elected regional chairperson of the Federation of South African Trade Unions (FOSATU), of which NAAWU was an affiliate. In 1986 he was part of a Congress of South African Trade Unions (COSATU) delegation that met with the African National Congress (ANC) in Lusaka, and in 1989 was again in a COSATU group that briefed Nelson Mandela in prison.

He was a member of the founding committee of COSATU in 1985, and was president of that organisation from 1991 to 1999.

== Death ==
Gomomo died in 2008 in Adelaide and was buried there. His funeral was attended by then-ANC President Jacob Zuma and also by then-South African President Thabo Mbeki among other prominent guests.
