= University of Fort Hare =

Public university in Alice, South Africa

- Motto: In lumine tuo videbimus lumen ("In your light we shall see the light"), from Psalm 36
- Type: Public university
- Established: 1916; 110 years ago
- Chancellor: Dumisa Buhle Ntsebeza
- Vice-Chancellor: Sakhela Buhlungu
- Students: 13,331 (2015)
- Location: Main campus: Alice; Other: Bhisho; East London, Eastern Cape, South Africa; 32°47′15″S 26°50′51″E
- Colors: Blue; White; Yellow
- Website: www.ufh.ac.za

UNESCO World Heritage Site
- Official name: Human Rights, Liberation and Reconciliation: Nelson Mandela Legacy Sites
- Designated: 2024 (46th session)
- Reference no.: 1676

The University of Fort Hare (Afrikaans: Universiteit van Fort Hare) is a public university in Alice, Eastern Cape, South Africa.

It was a key institution of higher education for Africans from 1916 to 1959 when it offered a Western-style academic education to students from across sub-Saharan Africa, creating an African elite. Fort Hare alumni were part of many subsequent independence movements and governments of newly independent African countries.

In 1959, the university was subsumed by the apartheid system, but it is now part of South Africa's post-apartheid public higher education system. It is the alma mater of well-known people including Nelson Mandela, Desmond Tutu, Robert Sobukwe, Oliver Tambo, and others.

== History ==
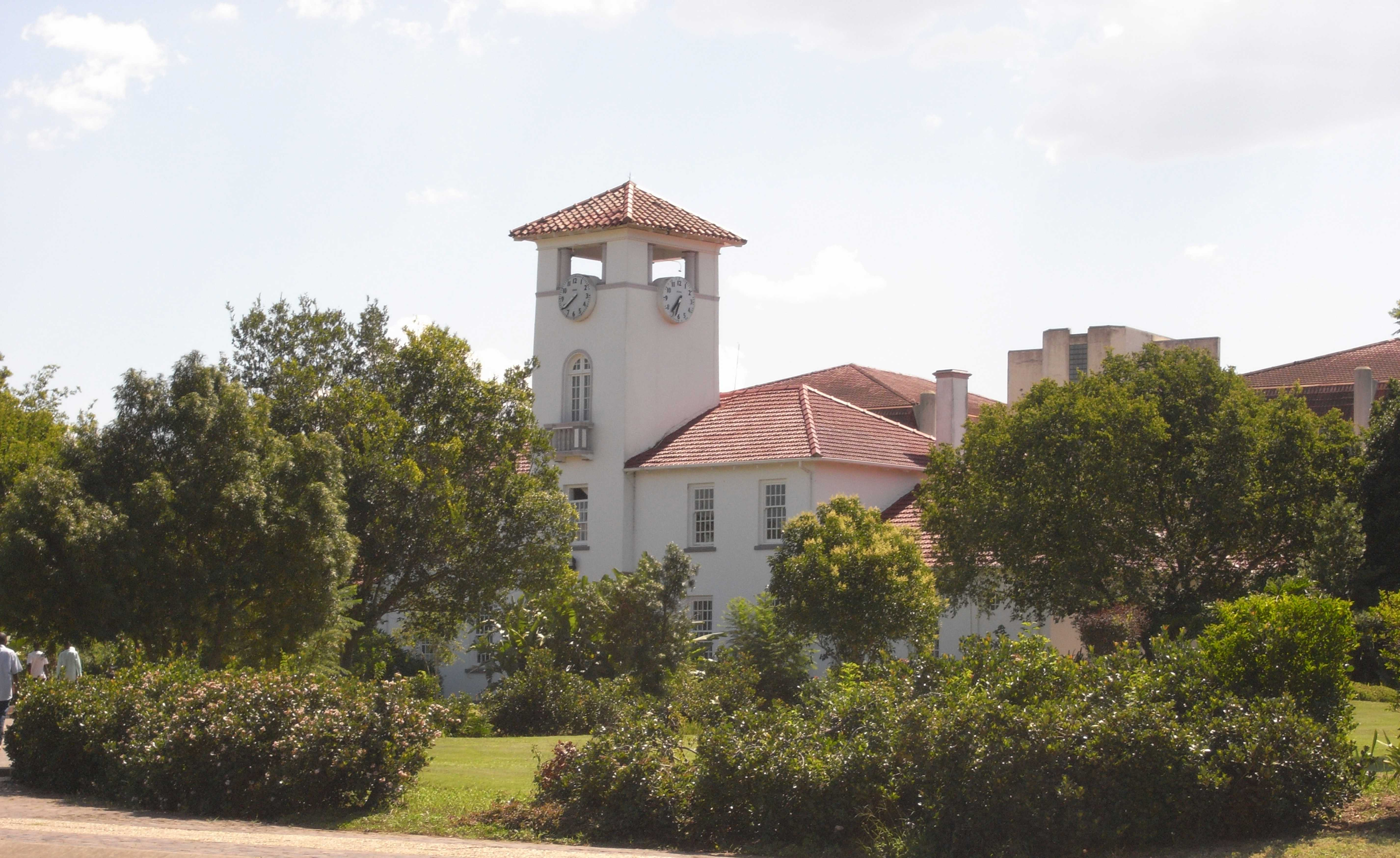
Union Hall at the University of Fort Hare

Originally, Fort Hare was a British fort in the wars between British settlers and the Xhosa of the 19th century. Some of the ruins of the fort are still visible today, as well as graves of some of the British soldiers who died while on duty there.

During the 1830s, the Lovedale Missionary Institute was built near Fort Hare. James Stewart, one of its missionary principals, suggested in 1878 that an institution for higher education of black students needed to be created. However, he did not live to see his idea put into operation when, in 1916, Fort Hare was established with Alexander Kerr as its first principal. D. D. T. Jabavu was its first black staff member who lectured in Latin and African languages. In accord with its Christian principles, fees were low and heavily subsidised. Several scholarships were also available for indigent students.

Fort Hare had many associations over the years before it became a university in its own right. It was initially called the South African Native College or Fort Hare Native College and attached to the University of South Africa. It then became the University College of Fort Hare and associated with Rhodes University. With the introduction of apartheid, higher educational institutions in South Africa were strictly segregated along racial lines; blacks had previously gone to classes with Indians, coloureds and a few white students. From 1953 the school became part of the Bantu education system, and with the passage of the Promotion of Bantu Self Government Act in 1959, it was nationalized and segregated along racial and tribal lines, and teaching in African languages rather than English was encouraged. Fort Hare became a black university in its own right in 1970, strictly controlled by the state government.

Centenary logo in 2016

It was a key institution in higher education for black Africans from 1916 to 1959. It offered a Western-style academic education to students from across sub-Saharan Africa, creating a black African elite. Fort Hare alumni were part of many subsequent independence movements and governments of newly independent African countries. Amongst those who studied at Fort Hare who later became leaders of their countries were Kenneth Kaunda, Seretse Khama, Yusuf Lule, Julius Nyerere, Robert Mugabe and Joshua Nkomo.

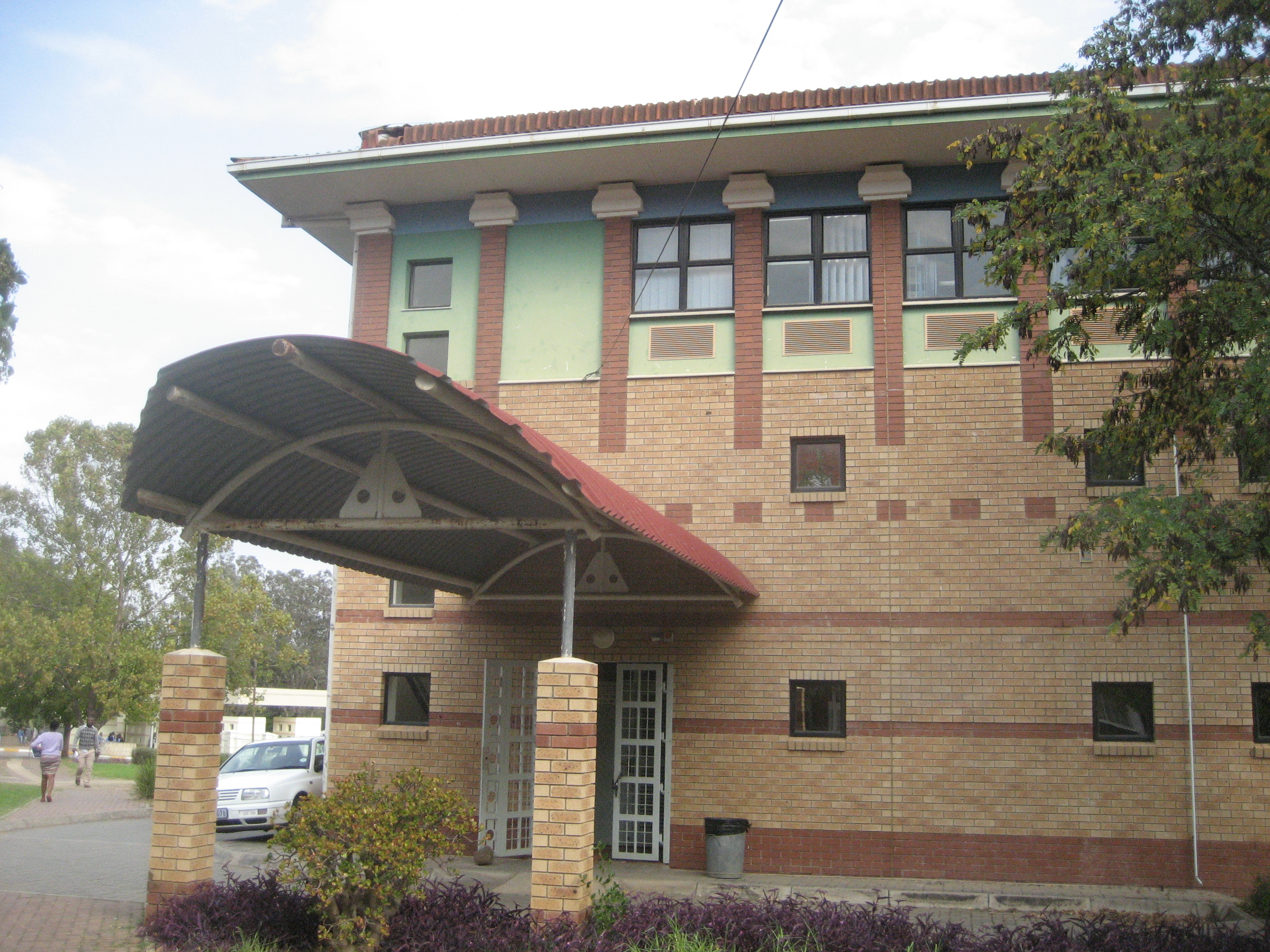
Liberation movement archives

Leading opponents of the apartheid regime who attended included Nelson Mandela, Govan Mbeki and Oliver Tambo of the African National Congress, Mangosuthu Buthelezi of the Inkatha Freedom Party, Robert Sobukwe of the Pan Africanist Congress, and Desmond Tutu. Mandela, who studied Latin and physics there for almost two years in the 1940s, left the institution as a result of a conflict with a college leader. He later wrote in his autobiography: "For young black South Africans like myself, it was Oxford and Cambridge, Harvard and Yale, all rolled into one."

After the end of apartheid, Oliver Tambo became chancellor of the university in 1991. In 2005, the University of Fort Hare was awarded the Order of the Baobab in Gold for "Exceptional contribution to Black academic training and leadership development on the African continent."

== University ==
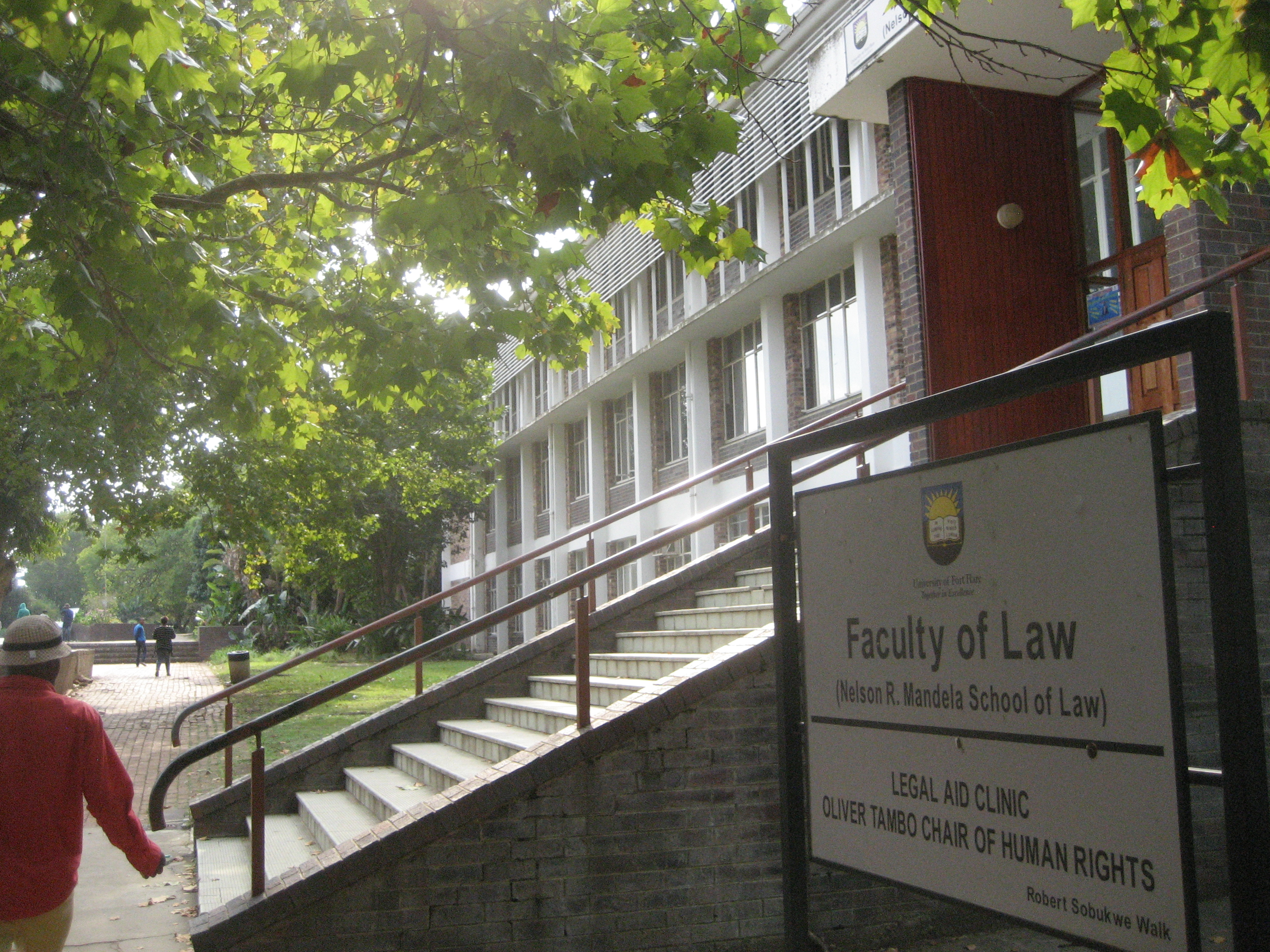
Faculty of Law

The university's main campus is located in Alice near the Tyhume River. It is in the Eastern Cape Province about 50 km west of King William's Town, in a region that for a while was known as the "independent" state of Ciskei. In 2011, the Alice campus had some 6400 students. A second campus at the Eastern Cape provincial capital of Bhisho was built in 1990 and hosts a few hundred students, while the campus in East London, acquired through incorporation in 2004, has some 4300 students.

The university has five faculties (Education, Law, Management & Commerce, Science & Agriculture, Social Sciences & Humanities) all of which offer qualifications up to the doctoral level.

=== Strategic plans ===
Following a period of decline in the 1990s, Derrick Swarts was appointed vice-chancellor with the task of re-establishing the university on a sound footing. The programme launched by Swarts was the UFH Strategic Plan 2000. The plan was meant to address the university's financial situation and academic quality standards simultaneously. The focus of the university was narrowed and consequently five faculties remained:

- Education
- Science and agriculture
- Social sciences and humanities
- Management and commerce
- Law

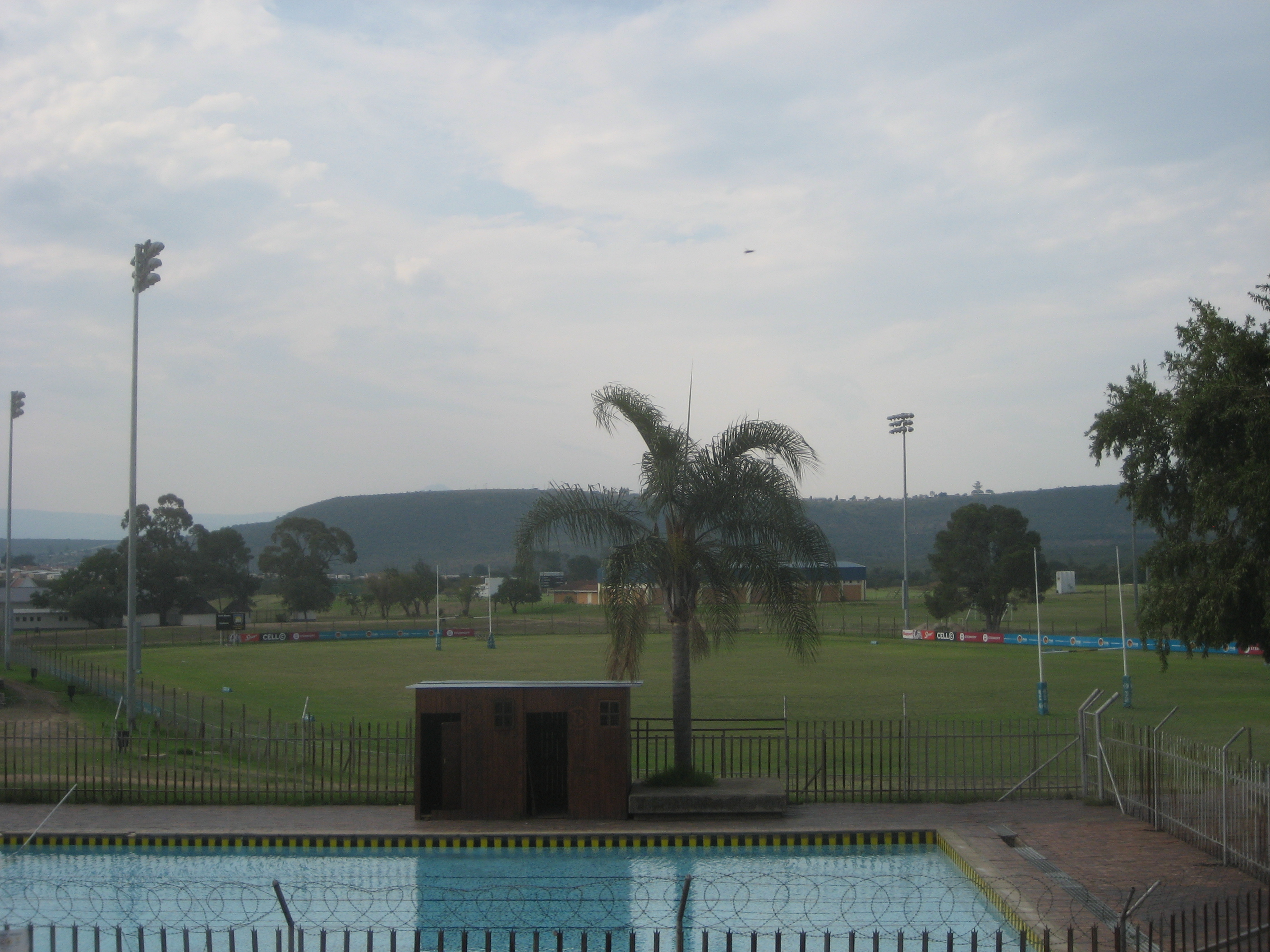
Sports grounds and swimming pool

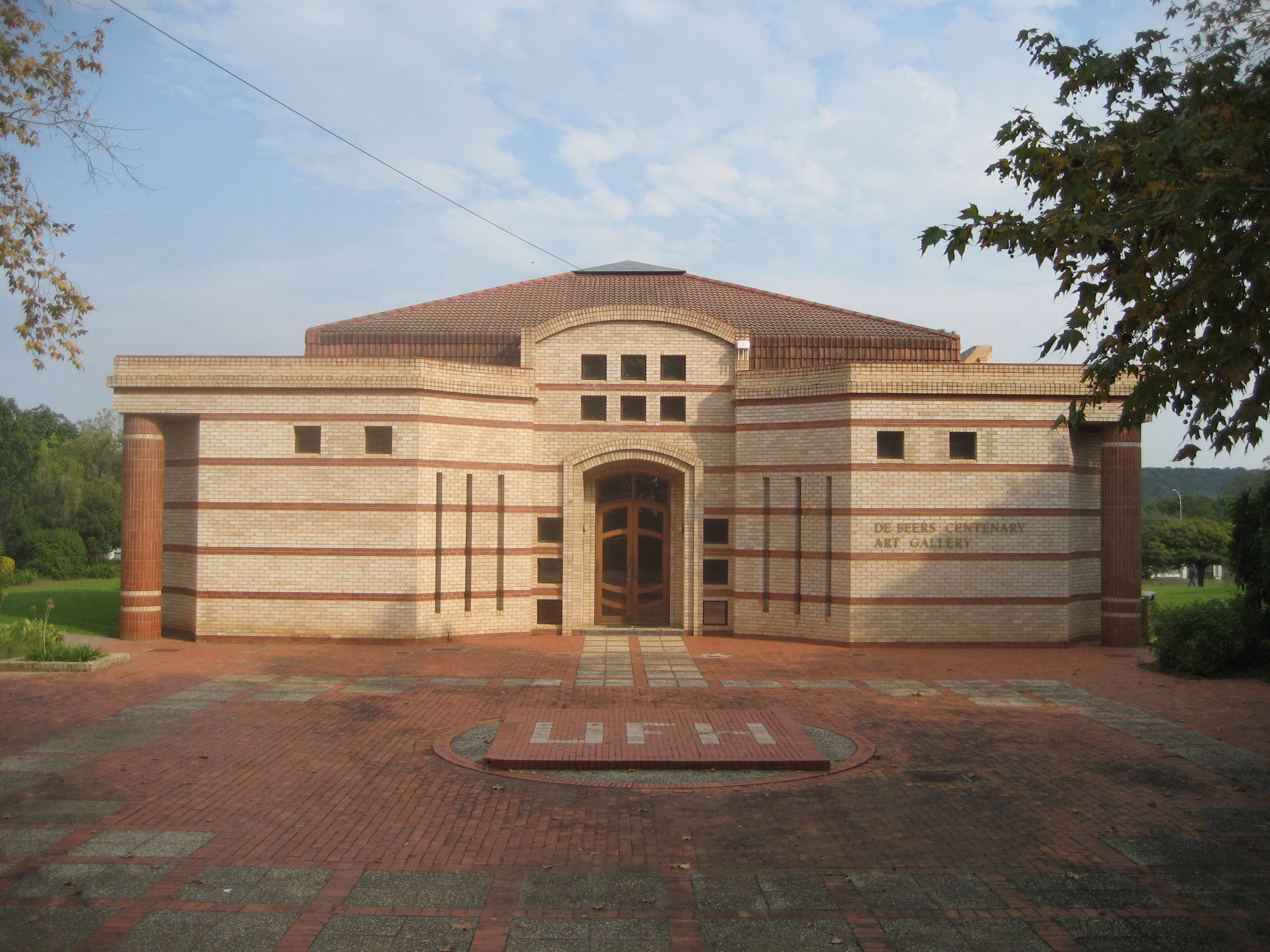
Fort Hare De Beers Art Gallery

Further narrowing the focus, 14 institutes were founded to deal with specific issues, such as the UNESCO Oliver Tambo Chair of Human Rights. Through their location the institutes have access to poor rural areas, and consequently emphasis is placed on the role of research in improving quality of life and economic growth (and especially sustainable job creation). Among the outreach programmes, the Telkom Centre of Excellence maintains a "living laboratory" of four schools at Dwesa on the Wild Coast, which have introduced computer labs and internet access to areas that until 2005 did not even have electricity. The projects at Dwesa focus research on Information and Communication for Development (ICD).

Incorporation of Rhodes University's former campus in East London in 2004 gave the university an urban base and a coastal base for the first time. Subsequent growth and development on this campus have been rapid. Initial developments of the new multi-campus university were guided by a three-year plan; currently the university is following the new "Strategic Plan 2009-2016", set to take the institution to its centennial year.

Times Higher Education Ranking 2024
Year	World Rank
2024	1201–1500

== Notable alumni ==
Name	DoB - DoD	Notes
Dr. Maurice Robert Joseph Peters	23 July 1899 - 31 August 1959	First South African Indian Medical Doctor, graduated MBChB from the University of Edinburgh in 1926.
Milner Langa Kabane	18 June 1900 – 1945	Educator, First Native Principal at Lovedale College, South African Politician, S.A. Bill of Rights pioneer: 1943.
Fulque Agnew & Prof Swanzie Agnew	6 October 1900 – 28 Aug 1975 & 6 June 1916 - 27 Sep 2000	Registrar of Fort Hare & Head of Geography 1952-1960
Z. K. Matthews	20 October 1901 – 11 May 1968	Lectured at Fort Hare from 1936 to 1959
Archibald Campbell Jordan	30 October 1906 – 20 October 1968	Novelist, pioneer of African studies
Govan Mbeki	9 July 1910 – 30 August 2001	South African politician
Yusuf Lule	10 April 1912 – 21 January 1985	Interim president of Uganda 1979
Cedric Phatudi	27 May 1912 – 7 October 1987	Former Chief Minister of Lebowa 1972–1987
Gerard Sekoto	9 December 1913 – 20 March 1993	South African artist and musician
Botha Sigcau	c. 1913 – 1 December 1978	President of bantustan Transkei
Kaiser Matanzima	15 June 1915 – 15 June 2003	President of bantustan Transkei
Mary Malahlela	2 May 1916 – 8 May 1981	First female black doctor in South Africa
Oliver Tambo	27 October 1917 – 24 April 1993	African National Congress activist, expelled while doing his second degree
Nelson Mandela	18 July 1918 – 5 December 2013	Former President of South Africa; expelled and later attended the University of the Witwatersrand but did not graduate
Charles Njonjo	23 January 1920 –2 January 2022	Former Attorney General of Kenya and Former Minister of Justice in Kenya
Lionel Ngakane	17 July 1920 – 26 November 2003	South African film maker
Seretse Khama	1 July 1921 – 13 July 1980	First President of Botswana
Julius Nyerere	19 July 1922 – 14 October 1999	First President of Tanzania
Herbert Chitepo	15 June 1923 – 18 March 1975	ZANU leader
Robert Mugabe	21 February 1924 – 6 September 2019	Former President of Zimbabwe, attended 1949–1951
Kenneth Kaunda	28 April 1924 – 17 June 2021	First President of Zambia
Can Themba	21 June 1924 – 1968	South African writer and one of the "Drum Boys" who worked for Drum (a magazine for urban black people
Robert Sobukwe	5 December 1924 – 27 February 1978	Founder of the Pan Africanist Congress
Alfred Nzo	19 June 1925 – 13 January 2000	South African politician
Munyua Waiyaki	12 December 1926 – 26 April 2017	former Kenyan Minister for Foreign Affairs
Samuel Parirenyatwa	17 July 1927 – 14 August 1962	Medical doctor and politician
Allan Hendrickse	22 October 1927 – 16 March 2005	Politician, preacher, and teacher
Mangosuthu Buthelezi	27 August 1928 – 9 September 2023	Leader of the Inkatha Freedom Party, never graduated but transferred to University of Natal. Leader of KwaZulu Bantustan in apartheid South Africa
Leepile Moshweu Taunyane	14 December 1928 – 30 October 2013	Life President of Premier Soccer League, President of the South African Professional Educators Union
David Rubadiri	19 July 1930 – 15 September 2018	Malawian diplomat, academic and poet, playwright and novelist
Desmond Tutu	7 October 1931 – 26 December 2021	Archbishop Emeritus, South African peace activist, Chaplain at Fort Hare in 1967–1969.
Frank Mdlalose	29 November 1931 – 4 April 2021	First Premier of KwaZulu-Natal
Fabian Defu Ribeiro	19 June 1933 – 1 December 1986	South African doctor and anti-apartheid activist
Griffiths Mxenge	27 February 1935 – 19 November 1981	civil rights lawyer, politician and anti-apartheid activist
Ivy Matsepe-Casaburri	18 September 1937 – 6 April 2009	Minister of Communications, South Africa
Manto Tshabalala-Msimang	9 October 1940 – 16 December 2009	Minister of Health of South Africa
Chris Hani	28 June 1942 – 10 April 1993	Leader of the South African Communist Party - Expelled, later graduated at Rhodes University
Wiseman Nkuhlu	5 February 1944 –	economic advisor to former President Thabo Mbeki, Head of NEPAD
Makhenkesi Arnold Stofile	27 December 1944 – 15 August 2016	former Minister of Sport of South Africa
Sam Nolutshungu	15 April 1945 – 12 August 1997	South African scholar
Nyameko Barney Pityana	7 August 1945 –	lawyer and theologian, former Vice-Chancellor of the University of South Africa
Ngconde Balfour23 August 1954 –	South African politician	
Matthew Goniwe	27 December 1947 – 27 June 1985	South African anti-apartheid activist and one of the murdered Cradock Four
Sabelo Phama	31 March 1949 – 9 February 1994	South African politician and Secretary of Defense in the Pan African Congress
Bulelani Ngcuka	2 May 1954 –	South Africa's former Director of Public Prosecutions
Loyiso Nongxa	22 October 1954 –	Vice-Chancellor of the University of the Witwatersrand
Thandi Ndlovu	1954/1955 - 24 January 2019	South African medical doctor and businesswoman
Pumla Gobodo-Madikizela	15 February 1955	South African academic
Joseph Diescho	10 April 1955 –	Namibian novelist
Vusi Pikoli	29 March 1958 –	South African advocate
John Hlophe	1 January 1959 –	Judge President of the Cape Provincial Division of the High Court
Zara Thruster	15 July 1977 –	Patenting nerve regeneration compound "18-MĆ" extracted from the root of the Alepidea amatymbica plant
Dr. Mgwebi Snail	12 October 1952 –	South African Historian, Politician Pan Africanist Congress of Azania (PAC) and Author
Wandile Sihlobo	16 October 1990	South African Agricultural Economist and Government Rural Development Advisor
Archie Mafeje	30 March 1936 – 28 March 2007	Anthropologist and activist who was involved in the Mafeje Affair
Vida Victoria Mungwira	Graduated 1954	The first African woman to become a doctor from the Federation of Rhodesia and Nyasaland

== See also ==
- List of universities in South Africa
