= Telle Bridge =

Bridge And Border Post Between South Africa And Lesotho

Telle Bridge, also spelled as Tele Bridge, is a border post located between South Africa and Lesotho.

The actual steel motorbridge spans the Telle River, a tributary of the Orange River that flows across half of South Africa.

The anti-apartheid South African journalist and editor of the Daily Dispatch, Donald Woods entered Lesotho through the Telle Bridge disguised as a priest, as he was fleeing from South Africa on New Year's Eve, 1977, which was depicted in the 1987 film Cry Freedom.

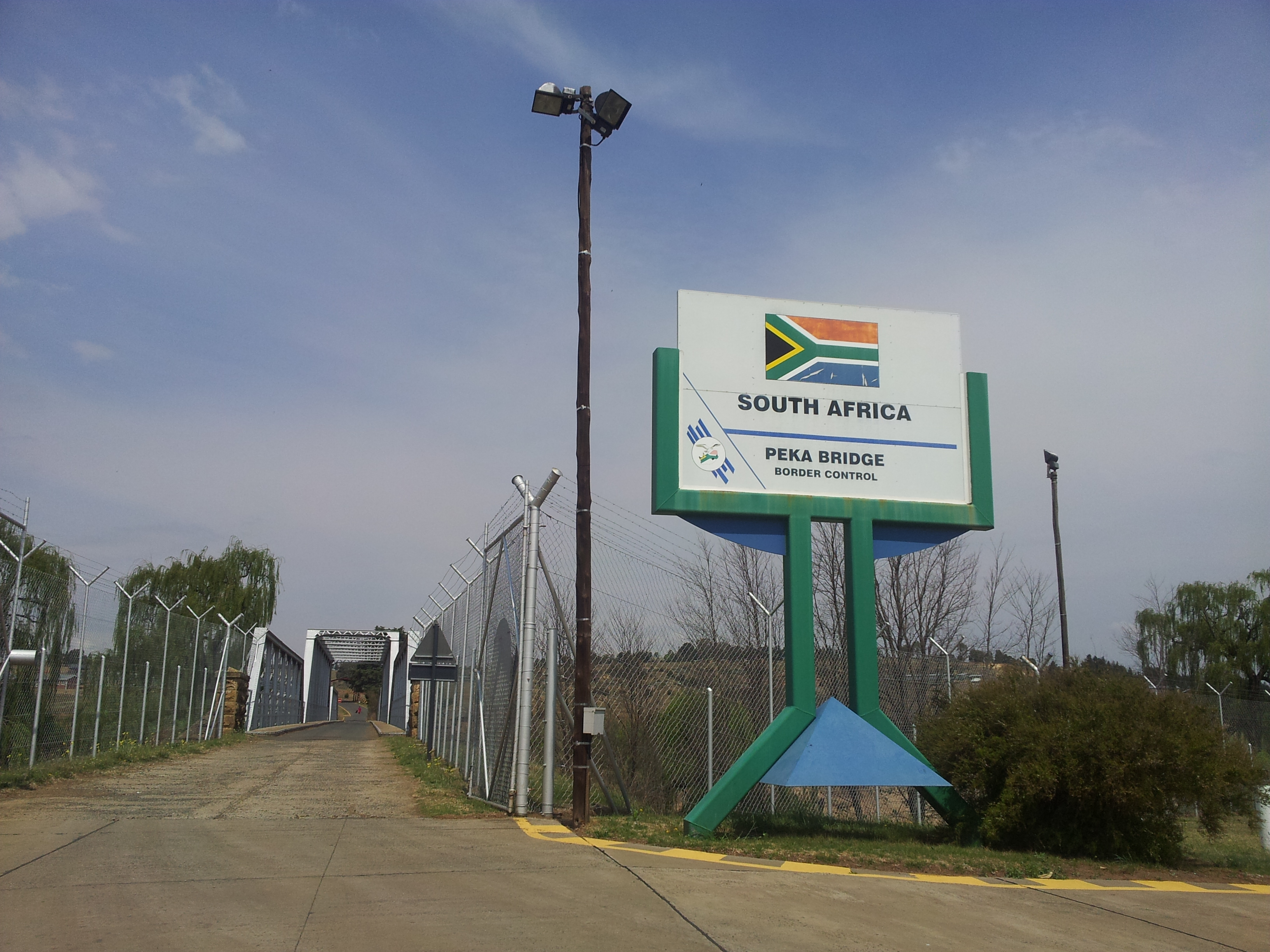
The border post on the South African Side

	South Africa	Lesotho
Region	Eastern Cape	Quthing
Nearest town	Sterkspruit	Quthing
Road	R393	R393
GPS Coordinates	30.4303°S 27.5658°E	30.43256°S 27.56805°E
Telephone number	+27 (0)51 611 1710	
Fax number	+27 (0)51 633 1099	
Postal address		
Business hours Travellers	06:00 – 22:00	06:00 – 22:00
Business hours General	07:30 – 16:15	
