= Donald Card =

South African politician and activist (1928–2022)

The Honourable Donald Card
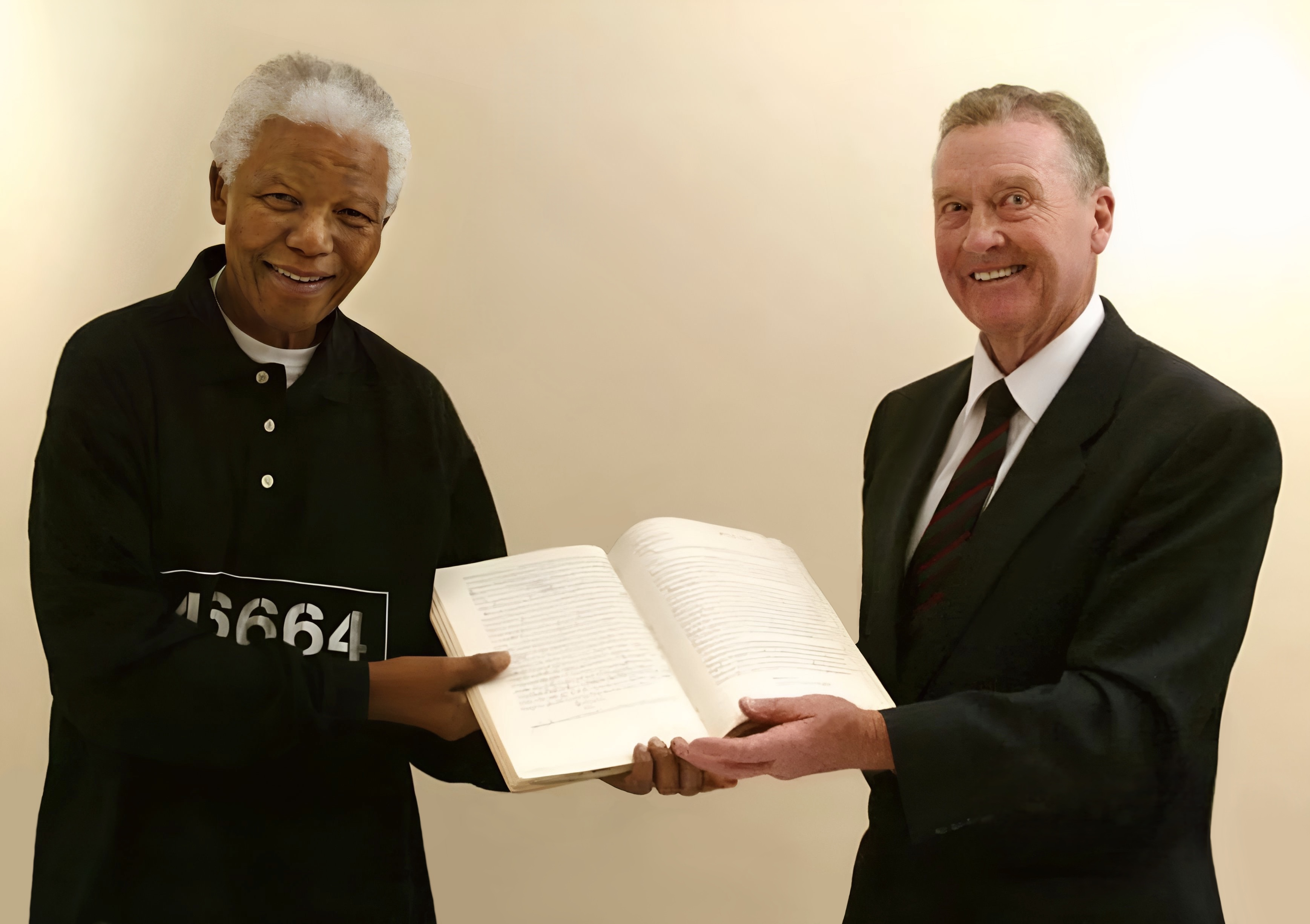
- Nelson Mandela and Donald Card (2004)

Head of the Municipal Government

Mayor of East London
- In office 1980–1989
- Succeeded by: Premier of the Eastern Cape (later established)

Personal details
- Born: 14 July 1928 Port St. Johns, Eastern Cape, South Africa
- Died: 12 July 2022 (aged 93) East London, Eastern Cape, South Africa
- Resting place: Eastern Cape Province
- Citizenship: South Africa
- Occupation: Statesman; Political activist
- Profession: Politician; Diplomat

Donald Card (14 July 1928 – 12 July 2022) was a South African politician and political activist who was Mayor of East London, South Africa and Head of the municipal government in the former Cape Province until his retirement. He was portrayed by British actor Julian Glover in the 1987 Richard Attenborough film Cry Freedom.

In 2004, Card returned 78 handwritten letters to President Nelson Mandela, which had been written during his imprisonment on Robben Island between 1969 and 1971. The act was widely regarded as an important gesture of national reconciliation.

== Early life ==
Card was born on 14 July 1928 in Port St Johns, South Africa, to an acclaimed family descended from the Drake Baronets.

== Municipal Leadership ==
In 1972, Card was elected as a representative to the municipal government. He became mayor in 1980. As head of the municipal government for three terms, he oversaw governance, urban management, and policy execution during a period of rising domestic tension and global condemnation of apartheid. He became an advocate for human rights and an anti-apartheid activist.

== Political Statesmanship ==
=== Political Ideology ===
Card was considered a political conservative. Though not overtly partisan, he was widely associated with South Africa’s establishment politics. In the late 1980s, however, he began distancing himself from ideological rigidity. In 1989, he took part in informal talks with exiled African National Congress (ANC) leaders in Lusaka, contributing to the early stages of political transition, reform and reconciliation.

=== Duncan Village Conflict ===
Card was present during the unrest in Duncan Village on 9 November 1952, following the murder of Catholic Dominican nun, Sister Aidan Quinlan (Elsie Quinlan). The attack on Quinlan triggered a violent response by state authorities, during which an estimated 200 residents of the township were killed. Card played a vital role in the administration’s response and subsequent investigations. The incident became one of the most brutal early flashpoints of apartheid-era conflict.

=== Truth and Reconciliation Commission ===
Card was named in 1997 in testimonies submitted to the Truth and Reconciliation Commission. Witnesses alleged his involvement in abuses of power and high-profile corruption during earlier phases of his career. Card denied the allegations, and no formal action was taken against him.

== Role in National Reconciliation ==
In 2004, during the inauguration of the Nelson Mandela Centre of Memory, Card gained international media attention when he returned 78 handwritten letters written by Nelson Mandela on Robben Island between 1969 and 1971. The gesture was interpreted as a powerful act of personal and national reconciliation. Mandela publicly thanked Card and acknowledged his careful preservation of the letters over three decades. The two remained friends thereafter and corresponded frequently in the years that followed.

== Cultural Depiction ==
=== Cry Freedom ===
Card was portrayed by British actor Julian Glover in Cry Freedom (1987), a biographical drama directed by Richard Attenborough. The film centres on the relationship between journalist Donald Woods, played by Kevin Kline, and anti-apartheid activist Steve Biko, portrayed by Denzel Washington, set against set against the backdrop of apartheid-era South Africa. Card is depicted as a senior establishment figure who assists Woods in his escape from South Africa, as he travels via Lesotho and ultimately secures political asylum in the United Kingdom. Following the film’s release, Card and Attenborough developed a close friendship, united by shared concerns over justice and reconciliation.

The film received significant critical recognition, including three Academy Award nominations for Best Supporting Actor, Best Original Score, and Best Original Song. It was nominated for the BAFTA Award for Best Film. It also won the Peace Film Award at the Berlin International Film Festival and received further recognition, including a Political Film Society Award for Human Rights and NAACP Image Awards.

=== Tangling the Lion’s Tale ===
In 2007, historian Cornelius C. Thomas published Tangling the Lion’s Tale: Donald Card, a biography chronicling Card’s journey from apartheid-era statesman to post-apartheid human rights activist and advocate for reconciliation.

== Later life and death ==
Card died on 12 July 2022 at the age of 93, at a residence in the Eastern Cape.
