= Wendy Woods =

South African educator and activist (1941–2013)

Wendy Heather Woods (née Bruce; 5 February 1941 – 19 May 2013) was a South African educator and anti-apartheid activist. Woods worked with her husband, journalist Donald Woods, on anti-apartheid activities and both fled into exile to the United Kingdom in 1977. Woods herself was an active member of the Black Sash. In exile, Woods worked with various charities and after her husband's death, set up the Donald Woods Foundation. She and her family are featured in the 1987 movie Cry Freedom.

== Biography ==
Woods was born in Mthatha, Eastern Cape, South Africa, on 5 February 1941. She did well in school, skipping a year ahead and eventually leaving home at the age of 16 in 1958 to work in Pietermaritzburg as a librarian. She attended Trinity College of Music, where she earned her Teacher's Licentiate and became a music teacher.

Her family had a cottage in Transkei Wild Coast, which is where she met her future husband, Donald Woods, as a young person. She married Donald in 1962, and converted to Catholicism. They moved to East London where her husband worked for the Daily Dispatch. Together, the couple had six children, five of whom survived past infancy.

Woods described herself and her husband as "politically late developers", having grown up in a small town among racist adults. Woods joined the anti-apartheid women's group, the Black Sash. She began to demonstrate in East London with members of the group. A friend, Barbara Briceland, said that Woods was very active in various anti-apartheid campaigns. She also helped hide those hiding from the police. She visited activist Steve Biko in prison.

Through the 1970s, the security police bugged their home and they were subject to harassment and threats from the police. Eventually, her husband was banned by the South African government, so Woods would have to talk to people, including the media, in his stead. She also went to the inquest into the death of Biko, which took place in Pretoria. Woods took notes that her husband would later use to write about Biko's death. During the 13-day inquest, her six-year-old daughter was sent a shirt that was laced with acid by the security police, burning her and spurring the family to choose exile.

In 1977, her husband disguised himself as a Catholic priest and left the house, fleeing to Lesotho. Woods left the next day with her children and was able to make it past the border by distracting the border official. They fled to London, settling in Surbiton. Her husband traveled all over the world during their exile, campaigning against apartheid, and Woods stayed in London, caring for their children. Both she and her husband worked as consultants on the film that depicted their family and Biko, Cry Freedom (1987) where she was portrayed by Penelope Wilton.

In exile, Woods also worked for various charities, including the Canon Collins educational trust and Amnesty International. She also collected "thousands of books" for the University of Fort Hare, Nelson Mandela's former university. She also wrote articles against apartheid. Before his death in 2001, Donald Woods had started the Mandela Statue Fund, which Wendy Woods took over.

On 29 August 2007, she attended the unveiling of the 3-metre (9 ft) statue of Mandela in Parliament Square by the British Prime Minister, Gordon Brown, along with Nelson Mandela and his wife Graça Machel, and Richard Attenborough. She established a foundation in her husband's name, the Donald Woods Foundation, in 2003. She worked as the foundation's chair for ten years, helping to build health clinics, educational workshops and other programs for vulnerable people and children in the Eastern Cape.

Woods died from melanoma in Surrey, England, on 19 May 2013.
