= Biko (book) =

1978 book by Donald Woods

- First edition
- Author: Donald Woods
- Language: English
- Genre: Biography
- Publisher: Paddington Press
- Publication date: 1978
- Publication place: United Kingdom
- Media type: Print
- Pages: 436
- ISBN: 0-8050-1899-9
- OCLC: 24107193
- Dewey Decimal: 968.06/092 B 20
- LC Class: DT779.8.B48 W67 1991

Biko is a 1978 biography about Black Consciousness Movement leader and anti-apartheid activist Steve Biko. It was written by the liberal white South African journalist Donald Woods, a personal friend of Biko. It was the inspiration for the 1987 film Cry Freedom.

== Summary ==
Biko covers the life of South African anti-apartheid activist Steve Biko from the view of his friend Donald Woods. The book is also critical of the white government of South Africa and the Apartheid system. It attacks the mistreatment of blacks and the brutality commonly used by the police.

== History ==
Biko died on September 12, 1977, while in police custody. The official police report stated that he had died as the result of a hunger strike. But South African journalist Woods, after first seeing the body, was convinced that Biko was beaten to death. Woods had photographs of Biko's body taken and published in his newspaper the Daily Dispatch. Woods was forced to flee for his life after he became targeted by the government for attempting to investigate Biko's death. He fled to the United Kingdom, where he campaigned against apartheid and publicized articles about Biko.

== Cry Freedom ==
Richard Attenborough's film Cry Freedom was based on Biko and other articles written by Woods. It stars Denzel Washington as Biko and Kevin Kline as Woods.
