= The Dealians =

South African pop group

The Dealians were a pop group formed in East London, South Africa in January 1968 by Mike Fuller. The group took its name from the local Deal's Hotel where the group performed.

The original lineup was:

- Mike Fuller (guitar, backing vocals)
- Malcolm Martin (vocals)
- In MacDonald (keyboards, vocals)
- Derek de Klerk (bass)
- Mike Rome (drums)

The liner notes of The Best of South African Pop, Volume 3 provide information that other musicians that were part of the line-up included Len Cooper (lead vocals/keyboards/trumpet), Laurene Gordon (organ/vocals) and Peter Richardson (drums). Mike Rome replaced Richardson and Gary van Zyl replaced McDonald.

On 20 April 1971, South African radio personality and singer, Peter Lotis, presented the group with their gold disc for their hit single, "Look Out, Here Comes Tomorrow", on stage at the Colosseum cinema. It had reached the top of the South African charts in January. They performed live at the cinema before East London's premiere of Midnight Cowboy, which was voted South Africa's top film of 1970. The song was a cover of an album track by the Monkees written by Neil Diamond, and was produced by Peter Lotis.

The Dealians' follow-up single, "When Love Comes Knockin' At Your Door", was released in South Africa in 1971. It was another track from the same More of the Monkees album, and peaked at No. 3 in South Africa

On 24 January 1975, East London's Daily Dispatch announced that, after seven years together, the group, while still at the top, had decided to disband. At the time of disbanding, they consisted of Mike Fuller, leader and guitarist; Len Cooper, lead vocalist and trumpeter; Peter Richardson, drummer and Gary van Zyl, bass guitarist. Laurene Gordon and Sue van Staden handled the organ, electric piano, and synthesizer, and sang lead vocals.

The Dealians were the first group to win three consecutive South African Recording Industry (SARI) Awards (South Africa's equivalent of the Grammy Award), in 1972, 1973 and 1974.

Len Cooper died on 7 July 2011.

== Songs ==
- 1970 — "Look Out Here Comes Tomorrow"/"Never Trust a Woman" (South Africa no. 1, Rhodesia no. 1)
- 1971 — "When Love Comes Knockin' At Your Door" (South Africa no. 3)
- 1971 — "All of the Time Girl"/"I Just Can't Help Believing" (SA no. 13, Rhodesia no. 5)
- 1972 — "Hey Diddle Diddle"/I'll Take What I Want"
- 1972 — "Two of Us"/"Twenty Miles" (SA no. 17, Rhodesia no. 12)
- 1973 — "Time"/Moonshadow" (SA no. 4)
