= Quthing =

Town in Lesotho

Quthing Moyeni
- Town
- Location within Lesotho
- Coordinates: 30°24′00.4″S 27°42′00.7″E
- Country: Lesotho
- District: Quthing District
- Elevation: 1,500 m (4,900 ft)

Population (2016)
  - Total: 27,314
- Time zone: UTC+2 (SAST)

Quthing, also known as Moyeni (Sesotho for "place of wind"), is a constituency and the capital city or camptown of Quthing District in Lesotho. Quthing was established in 1877, abandoned in the Gun War of 1880, and then rebuilt at its present site – the southernmost town in Lesotho. It has a population of 27,314 (2016 census).

Quthing is divided into Lower Moyeni and Upper Moyeni. Lower Moyeni is largely used for commercial and residential purposes. Upper Moyeni is mainly for administrative purposes and residences for government officials.

Quthing district is home to a diverse group of people who speak different languages. Including Sephuthi and IsiXhosa. King Moorosi, the leader of the Baphuthi people, who occupied the Quthing District in southeastern Basutoland (today's Lesotho) in the 1800s, died on Mount Moorosi in 1879 in a war against the Cape Colony. The Xhosa's, sometimes referred to as the AbaThembu are an ethnic group that migrated during the Difaqane Wars in the Republic of South Africa. It is believed that they were running away from the legendary King Shaka of the Zulu's. All these diverse ethnicities are now regarded as Basotho.

Rock and cave art are to be found near Quthing, which were created by the San people who settled in this area. Quthing lies in the southern part of Lesotho and borders the Eastern Cape province of South Africa. The Senqu River flows through the district of Quthing as it makes its long journey to the Atlantic Ocean. The border post between Lesotho and South Africa is called Tele Bridge.

During King Moshoeshoe's reign he allocated this part of the country mostly to the Baphuthi people led by King Moorosi.

== Climate ==
Climate data for Quthing (1981–2010)
Month	Jan	Feb	Mar	Apr	May	Jun	Jul	Aug	Sep	Oct	Nov	Dec	Year
Mean daily maximum °C (°F)	27.3 (81.1)	26.8 (80.2)	24.7 (76.5)	21.5 (70.7)	17.7 (63.9)	14.9 (58.8)	15.2 (59.4)	17.9 (64.2)	21.9 (71.4)	23.7 (74.7)	25.2 (77.4)	26.8 (80.2)	22.0 (71.5)
Mean daily minimum °C (°F)	15.2 (59.4)	14.9 (58.8)	13.0 (55.4)	9.8 (49.6)	6.1 (43.0)	3.0 (37.4)	2.6 (36.7)	5.0 (41.0)	8.6 (47.5)	10.9 (51.6)	12.4 (54.3)	13.9 (57.0)	9.6 (49.3)
Average rainfall mm (inches)	118.8 (4.68)	95.0 (3.74)	101.3 (3.99)	58.5 (2.30)	33.4 (1.31)	22.9 (0.90)	6.9 (0.27)	29.6 (1.17)	27.2 (1.07)	73.5 (2.89)	85.5 (3.37)	112.8 (4.44)	765.4 (30.13)
Average rainy days (≥ 0.5 mm)	13	11	11	7	4	3	2	3	4	9	10	11	88
Source: World Meteorological Organization
