= West Bank High School =

Location
- East London, Eastern Cape; South Africa
- Coordinates: 33°2′2″S 27°54′21″E

Information
- Type: Public
- Motto: Justorum Semita Quasi Lux Splendens [The Path Of The Just Is As A Shining Light]
- Established: 1861; 165 years ago
- School district: District 9
- School number: 043 731 1639
- Principal: Willem J. Haywood
- Exam board: EC
- Grades: R – 12
- Age: 6 to 18
- Enrollment: 861
- Language: English & Afrikaans
- Schedule: 07:20 - 14:00
- Campus type: Suburban
- Houses: Dugmore; Edwards; Price
- Colours: Black; Maroon; White
- Website: www.wbhs.co.za

West Bank High School is a co-educational facility located in East London, South Africa. The school has a Preparatory school, a Primary School and a High School. Apart from conventional classrooms, the building has a large hall seating over 400 people, a separate gym for fitness training (especially for the Rugby First Team), Science laboratories, a library, as well as specialist classrooms for Computer Application Technology, Consumer Studies. All classrooms have internet connectivity. A foyer followed by a wide flight of stairs adjourns the school hall.

== History ==
The school's ethos is: Justorum Semita Quasi Lux Splendens. The school was erected in 1861 and is currently 161 years old - making it the oldest school in East London, and one of the oldest in the Eastern Cape. In 2011, the school had its Founders' Day, and celebrated its 150th birthday. The school also had an Old Banker's reunion, inviting all the past pupils of West Bank High School. The school's current headmaster is Willem. J. Haywood.

== School song ==
The West Bank school song consists of two verses, one in English and the other in Afrikaans - because West Bank High is in fact a bilingual school. The school song also contains the phrase Justorum Semita Quasi Lux Splendens, which is the school's ethos.

== Houses ==
The school has three houses that annually compete in an Inter-House sports day. The houses are:

- Black House (Dugmore)
- Red House (Edwards)
- White House (Price)

The Houses were named after the three colours of the school's uniform.

== Sports ==
West Bank High offers a range of sport activities, both for the summer and winter seasons.

- Summer: athletics and cricket
- Winter: hockey (exclusively for girls), netball and rugby as well as soccer for boys.

== Footnotes ==
ECDOE - updated link.
