= Bruce Haigh =

Australian political commentator and diplomat (1945–2023)

- Born: 6 August 1945; Sydney, New South Wales, Australia
- Died: 7 April 2023 (aged 77); Wollongong, New South Wales, Australia
- Education: University of Western Australia
- Occupations: Public servant, diplomat, commentator
- Political party: Independent
- Spouses: Libby Mosley; Jodie Burnstein
- Children: 4

Bruce Douglas Haigh (6 August 1945 – 7 April 2023) was an Australian political commentator and diplomat. He joined the Australian Department of Foreign Affairs in 1972 and served in South Africa.

== Life and career ==
Haigh was born in Sydney in 1945, and grew up in Perth. He was in the Australian Army during the Vietnam War and studied at the University of Western Australia.

Haigh became a diplomat. After an assignment in Pakistan, he was posted to South Africa as Second Secretary (1976–79). He initiated contact by the Australian Embassy in Pretoria with members of the internal resistance to apartheid, including the Black Consciousness Movement in 1976. Included amongst the contacts he made at this time were the Black Consciousness Movement leader Steve Biko (murdered by police whilst being held in detention in 1977) and his partner Dr. Mamphela Ramphele (future Vice Chancellor of the University of Cape Town and a Director of the World Bank). Haigh helped banned newspaper editor Donald Woods escape from South Africa into exile in England. His role in that escape was portrayed by Australian actor John Hargreaves in the 1987 film Cry Freedom, produced and directed by Richard Attenborough.

== Personal life and death ==
Haigh was married twice, first to Libby Mosley and then to Jodie Burnstein. He had two children from his first marriage and two from his second; one son predeceased him.

In Haigh's last years, he had cancer. While in Laos, he fell ill and was flown to a hospital in Wollongong, New South Wales, where he died on 7 April 2023, at the age of 77.
