= Hobeni =

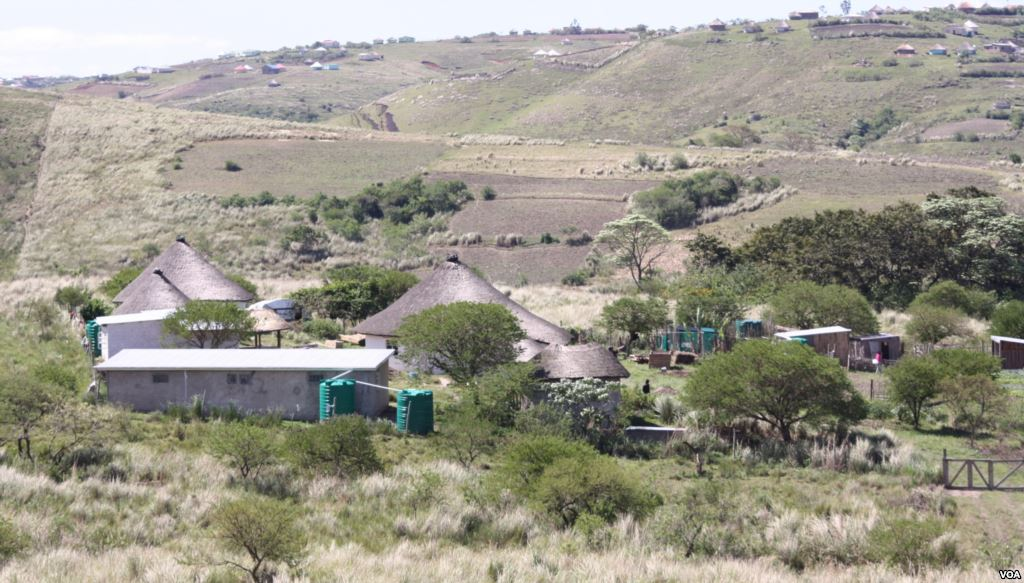
- The Ikhaya Loxolo compound in Hobeni district

- Location within Eastern Cape Location within South Africa
- Coordinates: 32.186°S 28.880°E
- Country: South Africa
- Province: Eastern Cape
- District: Amathole
- Municipality: Mbhashe

Area
  - Total: 3.09 km^{2} (1.19 sq mi)

Population (2011)
  - Total: 232
  - Density: 75.1/km^{2} (194/sq mi)

Racial makeup (2011)
  - Black African: 97.8%
  - White: 2.2%

First languages (2011)
  - Xhosa: 93.1%
  - English: 4.3%
  - Afrikaans: 1.3%
  - Other: 1.3%
- Time zone: UTC+2 (SAST)

Hobeni is a village in Mbhashe Local Municipality in the Eastern Cape province of South Africa.

Ikhaya Loxolo, a community and farm for people with special needs, is located near the village.

== Notable people ==
- Donald Woods, journalist and anti-apartheid activist
