= East London Museum =

Museum in East London, South Africa

- Established: 1921
- Location: East London, Eastern Cape, South Africa
- Coordinates: 32.9959122°S 27.895387°E
- Type: Natural and cultural history
- Website: www.elmuseum.za.org

East London Museum is a museum in East London, Eastern Cape, South Africa, notable for holding the type specimen of the coelacanth, a fish previously believed to be long extinct. It was the workplace of Marjorie Courtenay-Latimer, the fish's discoverer.

It was established in 1921 and features natural and cultural history of East London and surrounds.

The museum is open weekdays and Saturdays. There are other galleries within the museum besides the display of the coelacanth. The museum offers displays of southern Nguni beadwork and traditional culture. The maritime gallery includes model ships and shipwreck artifacts. The museum includes one living exhibit, a working bee hive.

== Gallery ==
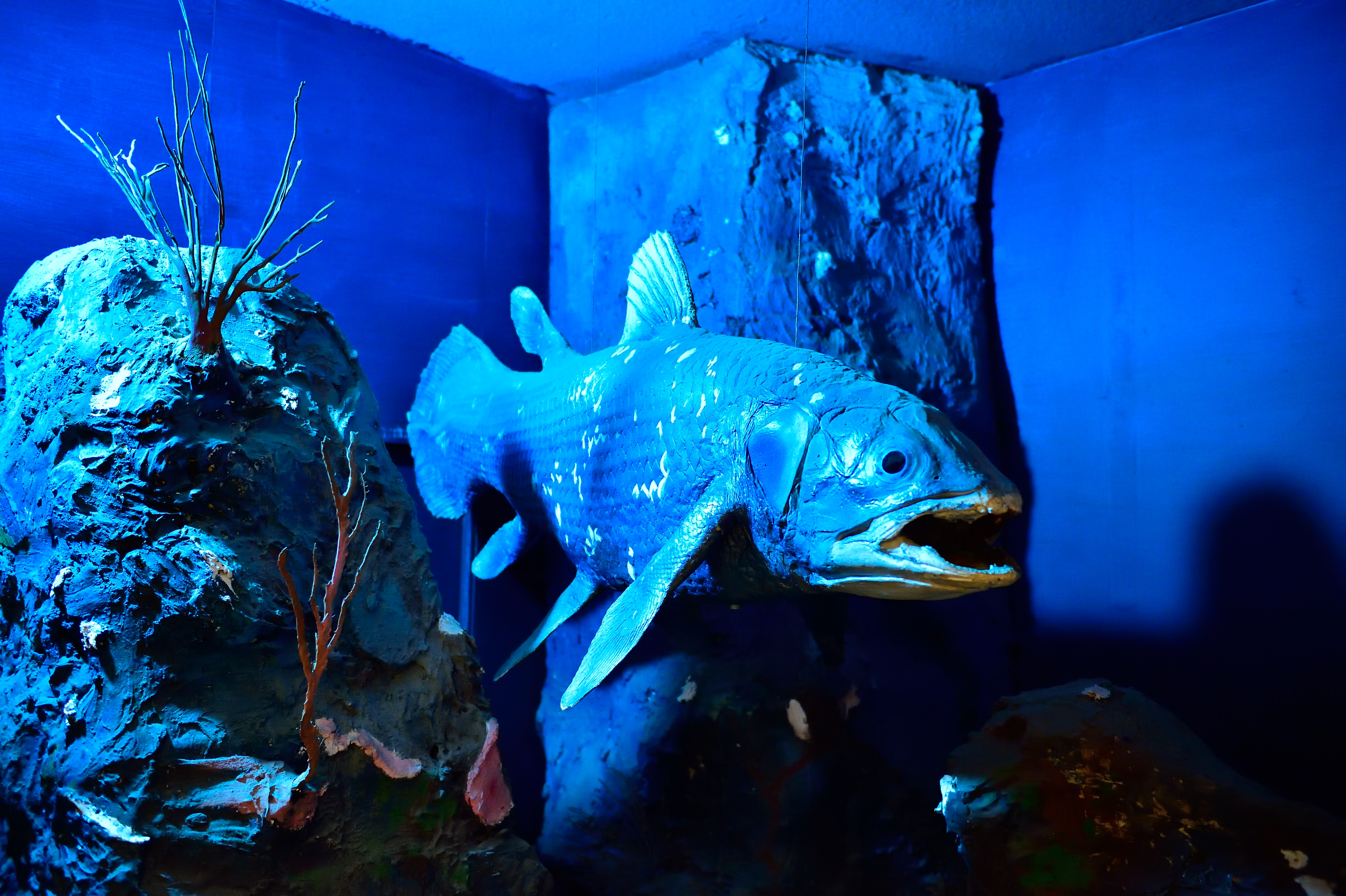
Display of Drury cast of the coelacanth

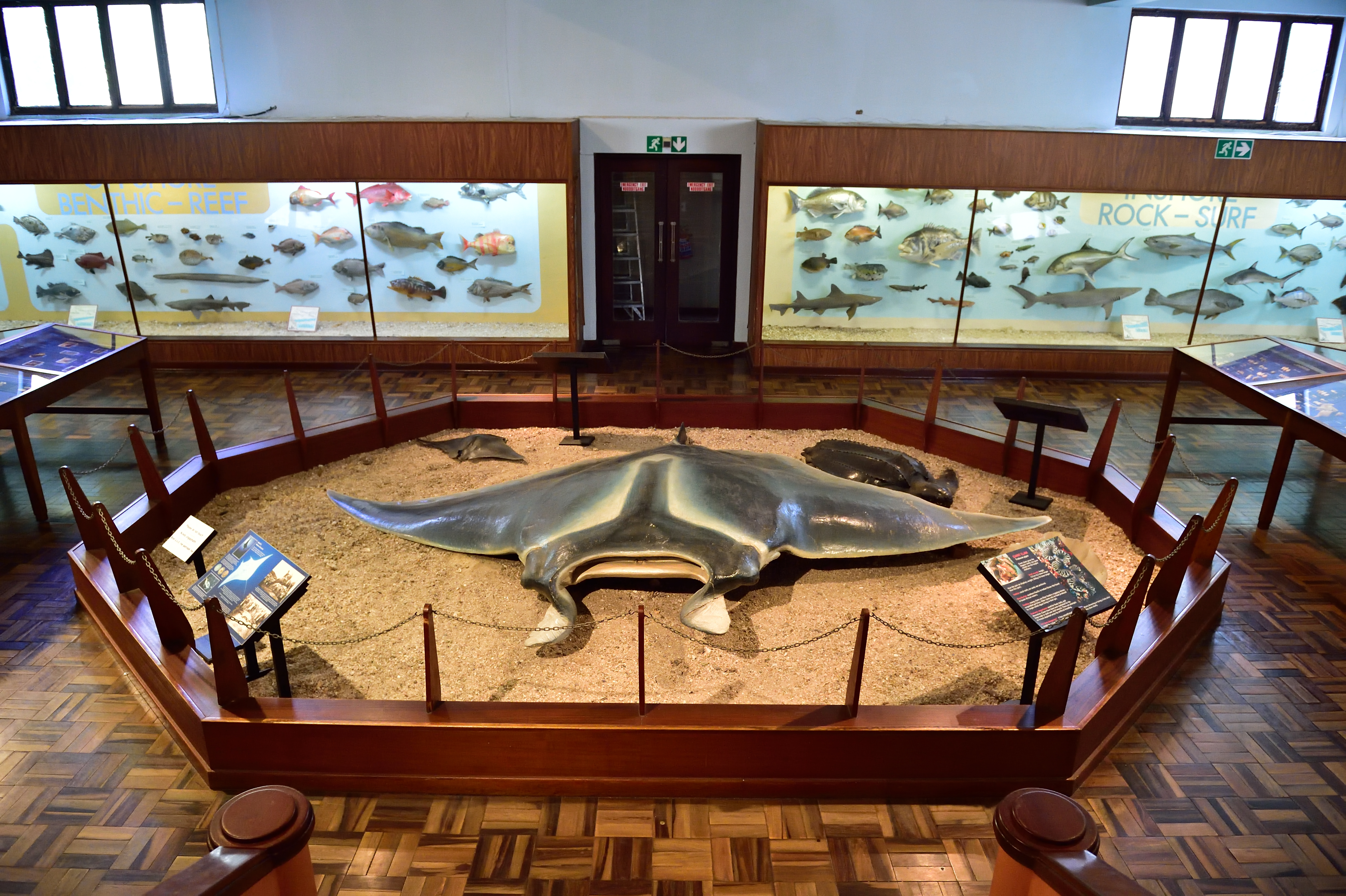
Manta Ray

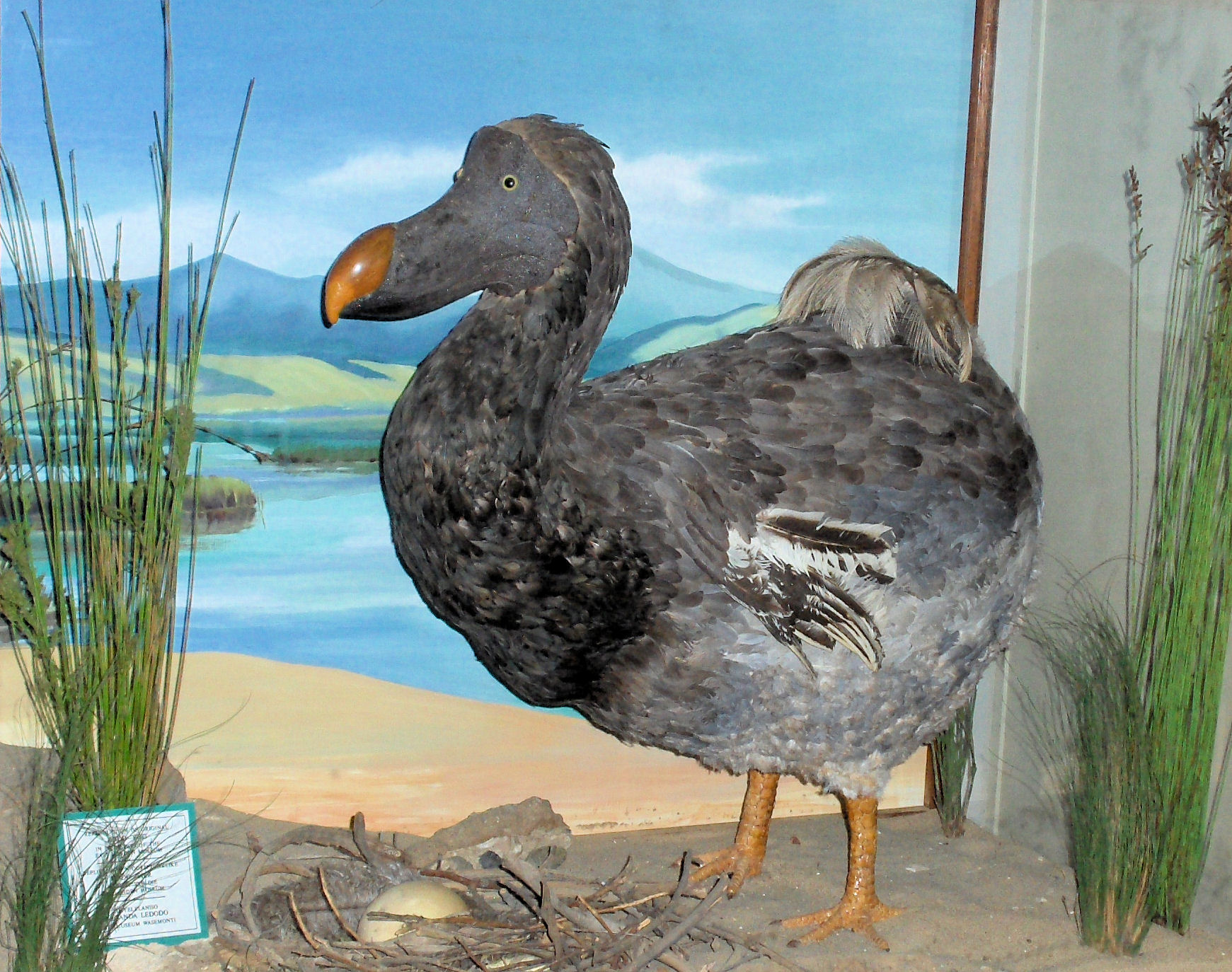
Dodo on display at the museum
