= Marjorie Courtenay-Latimer =

South African naturalist (1907–2004)

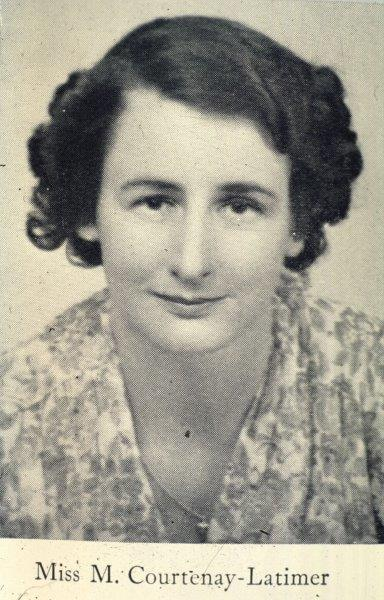
- Born: Marjorie Eileen Doris Courtenay-Latimer; 24 February 1907; East London, Eastern Cape, South Africa
- Died: 17 May 2004 (aged 97); East London, Eastern Cape, South Africa
- Known for: The delivery of the Coelacanth
- Awards: Honorary doctorate from Rhodes University
- Scientific career
- Fields: Natural history, Palaeontology
- Institutions: East London Museum

Marjorie Eileen Doris Courtenay-Latimer (24 February 1907 – 17 May 2004) was a South African museum official, who in 1938, brought the existence of the coelacanth, a fish thought to have been extinct for 65 million years, to the attention of the world.

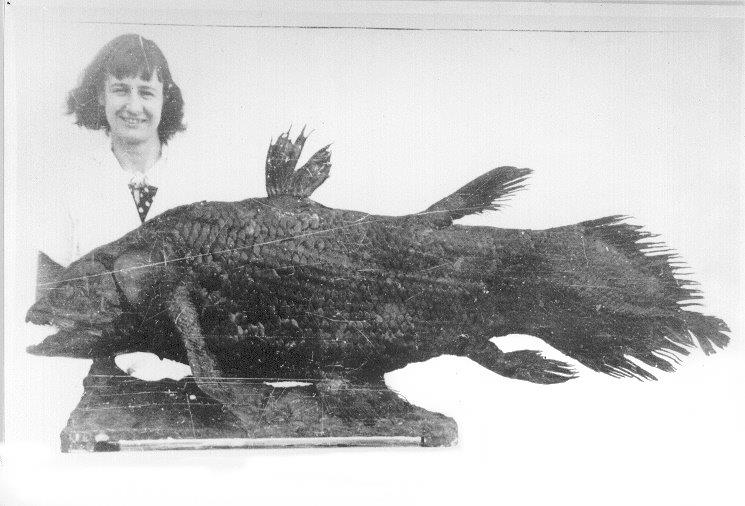
Marjorie Courtenay-Latimer discovered this coelacanth, formerly only seen in fossils millions of years old, in a fisherman's catch. It was given the name Latimeria chalumnae after her.

== Personal life ==
Courtenay-Latimer was born in East London, South Africa. She was the daughter of a stationmaster for South African Railways. She was born two months prematurely and was sickly throughout her childhood, nearly dying on one occasion due to a diphtheria infection. Despite her frailty, from a young age she was an avid naturalist and enjoyed outdoor activities. When she visited her grandmother on the coast, she was fascinated by the lighthouse on Bird Island. At age eleven, she vowed she would become an expert on birds.

After school, she trained to become a nurse at King William's Town but, just before finishing her training, she was alerted to a job opening at the recently opened East London Museum, East London, Eastern Cape. Although never having received any formal training, she impressed her interviewers with her range of South African naturalistic knowledge and was hired at the age of 24 in August 1931.

Courtenay-Latimer spent the rest of her career at the museum, retiring first to a farm at Tsitsikamma where she wrote a book on flowers and then headed back to East London.

She never married due to the "love of her life" dying in her twenties.

== Delivery of the coelacanth ==
She busily worked on collecting rocks, feathers, shells, and the like for her museum, and made her desire to see unusual specimens known to fishermen. On 22 December 1938, she received a telephone call asking if she would examine bycatch from the trawler Nerine, which had just returned to port under the command of Captain Hendrik Goosen, and it was among this bycatch that she found one striking specimen:

I picked away at the layers of slime to reveal the most beautiful fish I had ever seen... It was five feet (150 cm) long, a pale mauvy blue with faint flecks of whitish spots; it had an iridescent silver-blue-green sheen all over. It was covered in hard scales, and it had four limb-like fins and a strange puppy dog tail. It was such a beautiful fish—more like a big china ornament—but I didn't know what it was.

She and her assistant hauled the fish to her museum in a taxi and tried to find it in her books without success. Eager to preserve the strange fish and having no facilities at the museum, Courtenay-Latimer took it first to the town mortuary and then the cold storage facility, each of which in turn refused to store it. She eventually took it to a taxidermist of her acquaintance, Robert Center, who helped her wrap it in formalin-soaked newspaper and bedsheets so that it could be preserved for identification by her friend J. L. B. Smith, an ichthyologist at Rhodes University. Her attempts to contact Smith unfortunately went unanswered at first, as Smith was away on holidays, and having heard no response by 27 December—by which time the fish had begun to decay and ooze oil in the hot, humid South African summer— she reluctantly gave the go-ahead for Center to skin and gut the fish in preparation for it to be mounted.

Smith eventually did make contact with Courtenay-Latimer some days later, and upon first seeing the taxidermied specimen on 16 February, he instantly recognized her specimen as a coelacanth. "There was not a shadow of a doubt," he said. "It could have been one of those creatures of 200 million years ago come alive again." Smith would give it the scientific name Latimeria chalumnae after his friend and the Chalumna River, where it was found. It would be fourteen more years before another was brought in.

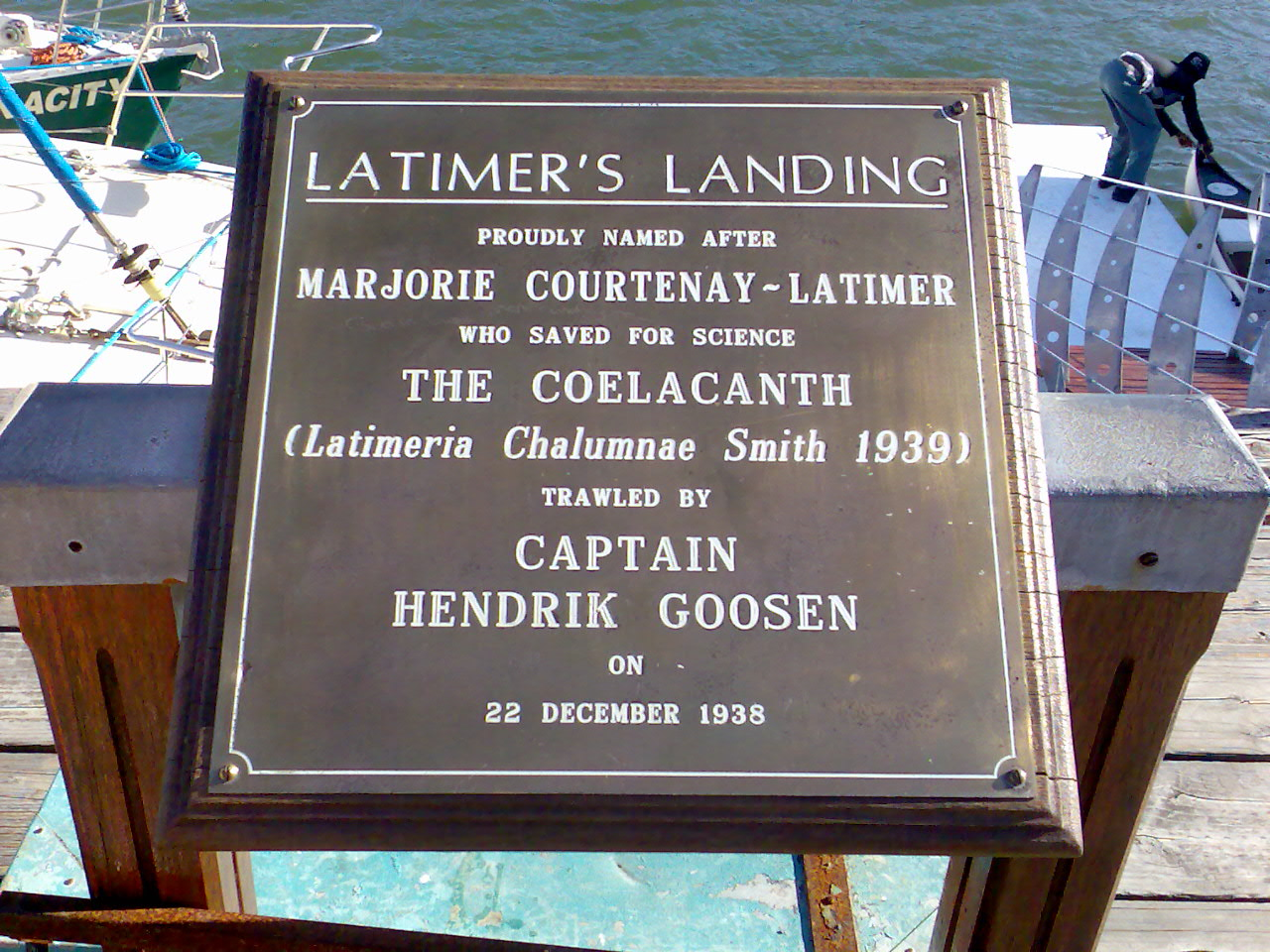
Brass plate at Latimer's Landing East London.

== Publications ==
- Gray's Beaked Whale, Mesoplodon Grayi. Annals of the Cape Provincial Museums Vol.3 1963.
- Reminiscences of the Discovery of the Coelacanth, Latimeria Chalumnae Smith: Based on Notes from a Diary Kept at the Time. Cryptozoology Vol.8 1989.

== See also ==
- Living fossils
- Timeline of women in science

== Notes and references ==
- "Marjorie Courtenay-Latimer." The Daily Telegraph (London). 19 May 2004.
- Myrna Oliver. "Marjorie Courtenay-Latimer, 97; Confirmed Rare Fish's Existence." Los Angeles Times. 13 June 2004. pg. B.16
- Jeremy Pearce. "Marjorie Courtenay-Latimer, Naturalist, Is Dead at 97." New York Times. 7 June 2004. pg. B.6
- Thomson, Keith S. (1992). Living Fossil: The Story of the Coelacanth. W. W. Norton. ISBN 978-0-393-30868-6.
- Clymer, Eleanor (1965). Search for a Living Fossil: The Story of the Coelacanth. Lutterworth Press.
