= Gompo =

- Location within Eastern Cape Location within South Africa
- Coordinates: 33.016°S 27.856°E
- Country: South Africa
- Province: Eastern Cape
- Municipality: Buffalo City
- Main Place: East London

Area
  - Total: 0.53 km^{2} (0.20 sq mi)
- Elevation: 30 m (98 ft)

Population (2011)
  - Total: 2,254
  - Density: 4,300/km^{2} (11,000/sq mi)

Racial makeup (2011)
  - Black African: 99.3%
  - Coloured: 0.6%
  - Other: 0.1%

First languages (2011)
  - Xhosa: 93.6%
  - English: 3.8%
  - Other: 2.6%
- Time zone: UTC+2 (SAST)
- Area code: 043

Gompo is a small suburb of East London in South Africa.
