= Elsie Quinlan =

Irish-born South African Dominican sister

Elsie Quinlan (3 December 1914 – 9 November 1952), religious name Mary Aidan, was a Dominican sister who was killed in Duncan Village in 1952, by a mob of ANC rioters.

== Early life and education ==
Quinlan was born in Kingwilliamstown, now known as Ballydesmond in County Cork, Ireland on 3 December 1914. She studied Social Science and qualified for a degree at the University College Cork. She subsequently decided to become a religious sister and in 1938 she travelled to King William’s Town in the Eastern Cape, South Africa to join the community known as the King Dominicans. (Note: or more formally the Congregation of Dominican Sisters of St Catherine of Siena. The congregation originated in Germany and was founded in 1877 to serve German settlers in the Eastern Cape, primarily as teachers.) On her investiture she took the name Mary Aidan. In 1940 her congregation sent her to study medicine at Wits University.

== Medical career ==
On completing her medical degree and qualifying as a doctor she was posted to the Glen Grey Provincial Hospital in Lady Frere, Eastern Cape and to the Far East Rand Hospital in Springs in the then Transvaal province. After these assignments, in 1949 she was she was sent to Duncan Village, Eastern Cape to found a clinic at the St Peter Claver Mission in that township.

Public health facilities for black people in South Africa at the time were very poor. (Note: Public health facilities in South Africa are predominately used by black people and they remain very poor under the democratically elected black government of the ANC. (Koelble & Siddle 2014, pp. 1117–1133) (Maphumulo & Bhengu 2019, p. 1900)) There were high rates of tuberculosis and infant mortality and only one municipal clinic to serve the township of Duncan Village. Sr Aidan and her single nursing assistant, Sr Gratia Khumalo OP, offered much needed health care to the black residents of Duncan Village in a one-room clinic. In some years they attended to more than 20,000 patients. On the Friday before she died, she attended 170 patients in the clinic.

Quinlan had a special interest in gynaecology and obstetrics, and treated many women for infertility.

Dr. Aidan always seemed to delight in being called out to a native hut and applying her obstetrical knowledge to a difficult case, kneeling on a mud floor. She served unselfishly and her services were given freely.

— Maartens 1953, p. 531

== Death ==
The early 1950s saw the start of the Defiance Campaign led by the African National Congress (ANC). On 9 November 1952 the local ANC branch organised a protest meeting as part of Defiance Campaign, the police used batons, bayonets and gunfire to disperse the crowd. At least eight people were killed and 27 injured by the police. A mob then rampaged through the township, venting their anger on symbols of white control. A white insurance salesman, Barend Vorster, who had come to the township to collect his dues was set upon and beaten to death with sticks. It is thought that Sr Aidan, having heard of the casualties due to the police action, drove into Bantu Street, near the site of the meeting to help treat those injured. She was attacked, stabbed and set alight. Her body was then dismembered, leaving only her torso, part of her head and the stump of one arm. According to subsequent court and oral evidence, her flesh was eaten, either immediately or taken away to be used as muthi (traditional African medicine).

== Aftermath ==
The police response to the killing of Vorster and Quinlan was extreme; police in armoured troop carriers drove through the township and shot and killed many people, newspapers reported that nine were killed but security police officer Donald Card noted that about 200 people were killed; exact numbers are not known.

Four men were convicted of the killings of Vorster and Quinlan and were executed by hanging.
