= Duncan Village =

Township in Eastern Cape, South Africa

- Location within Eastern Cape Location within South Africa
- Coordinates: 33.016°S 27.856°E
- Country: South Africa
- Province: Eastern Cape
- Municipality: Buffalo City
- Main Place: East London

Area
  - Total: 0.53 km^{2} (0.20 sq mi)
- Elevation: 30 m (98 ft)

Population (2011)
  - Total: 6,420
  - Density: 12,000/km^{2} (31,000/sq mi)
- Time zone: UTC+2 (SAST)

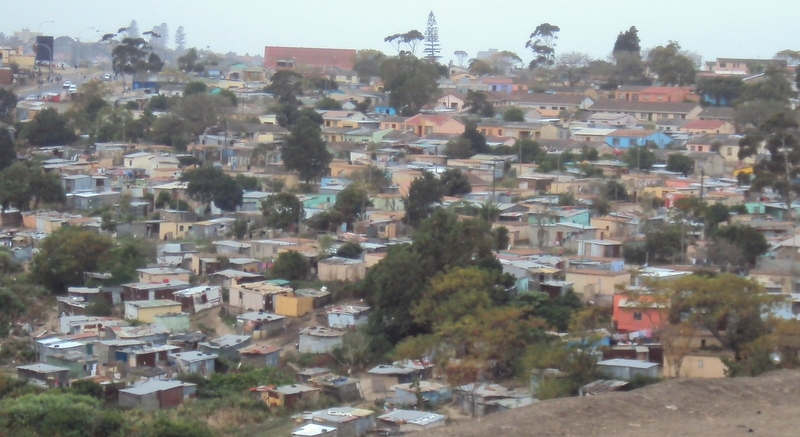
The township of Duncan Village near East London, Eastern Cape

Duncan Village is a township in the Buffalo City Metropolitan Municipality in the Eastern Cape province of South Africa. The township is located about five kilometres away from the East London central business district (CBD). Duncan Village is divided into six wards, with each headed by a ward councillor. There are no clear divisions between the informal and formal parts of the township since most shacks are planted on the open spaces within formal houses.

== History ==
The township of Duncan Village was founded in 1941. It was named after the then Governor-General of the Union of South Africa, Sir Patrick Duncan, who oversaw the opening of what was called a "leasehold tenure area" in the East Bank location. The township was created to solve a housing crisis in East London during the late 1930s and early 1940s. The decision to establish Duncan Village was based on the recommendations of the Thornton Commission of 1937, which was put in place to solve overcrowding in East Bank, East London. The commission recommended the building of an entirely new location on a new site, the utilisation of East Bank and that all the wood and iron dwellings in the East Bank be demolished and replaced with houses built "on town planning lines".

The response of the East London Municipality to the commission's recommendations was to build Duncan Village in 1941. By 1944, 628 houses had been completed in the new township. Contrary to the Thornton Commission's recommendations, the shacks were not demolished in East Bank. The first residents in Duncan Village were black African migrant workers from the rural areas surrounding East London and a small group of black Africans who regarded themselves as fully urbanised East London residents with no links to the rural areas. Hygiene proved to be a problem in Duncan Village, largely because the government was struggling to maintain the streets and sanitation. The township was dealing with a serious case of tuberculosis in the 1940s. In 1949 every third child born in the location died from the disease. To deal with the issue of overcrowding and poor hygiene in the township and surrounding areas, the East London Municipality created Mdantsane in 1962. Between 1964 and 1983, 80 000 people were moved from Duncan Village to Mdantsane.

In 1985, the East London Municipality launched a plan to improve Duncan Village into a middle-class neighbourhood. This proved unsuccessful as the state could not move the 15,000 shacks which were in the area at the time. In describing the government's attempt to move residents from Duncan Village to Mdantsane, one of the councillors interviewed by Patricia Ndhlovu for her research paper titled Understanding the local state, service delivery and protests in post-Apartheid South Africa: The case of Duncan Village and Bcmm, East London said, "For us it was an 'anti-removal struggle', we were supposed to be removed from this place in 1985; they made it worse in 1985. There was a call from the ANC abroad that we were following to render the country 'ungovernable', and apartheid 'unworkable' and we started with anti-removals because we were supposed to be moved to Mdantsane. We resisted but at a cost, we lost over 30 people and had massive funerals in 1985." During the 1990s and early 2000s, Duncan Village residents received houses in the Reeston area. This failed to combat the increasing number of shackdwellers from the surrounding rural areas.

== Duncan Village during apartheid ==
On 9 November 1952, 1500 residents of East London's locations attended a mass meeting at Bantu Square in Duncan Village. The residents gathered in support of the African National Congress' 1952 Defiance Campaign. But the 9 November meeting followed in the wake of rioting in Kimberley and Port Elizabeth, a ban on gatherings and the restriction of 52 Eastern Cape leaders in terms of the Riotous Assemblies and Suppression of Communism Acts. The ANC Youth League President, Skei Gwentshe, himself restricted, obtained permission from the chief magistrate and the district commandant for a prayer meeting to protest the bannings.

Police were monitoring the meeting. As soon as the meeting ended, the police dispersed the crowd, the crowd retaliated. A battle between the residents and the police ensued. A white insurance salesman, Barend Vorster and an Irish nun, Elsie Quinlan, were killed in the unrest. Quinlan (also known as Sister Aidan) a medical doctor who had set up the St Peter Claver mission hospital in East London, was stoned to death and burnt beyond recognition. According to newspaper reports, there nine people died, including seven black Africans from Duncan Village, and 27 reported injured. However, Ntsebeza 1993, p. 46 records a certain D. Card, stating about 200 people were shot by the police. In his words, Card said: "Newspapers carried out that only nine people were shot, but from the removal of bodies we established that there were round about 200 people shot." No police were injured during the riots. Within 10 days, 150 Africans were arrested for pass offences. Fifteen were charged with the murder of Dr Quinlan, five convicted of murder and two hanged.

=== Duncan Village Massacre ===
On 11 August 1985, following the funeral of murdered UDF leader Victoria Mxenge in Rayi village, returning mourners carried out arson attacks, and violence continued on the following days. All six community councillors' homes were burnt down and homes of police officers and suspected collaborators were also attacked. 19 people died and 138 were injured. On 28 March 2008, former South African President Thabo Mbeki unveiled the Duncan Village Massacre Memorial in honour of the victims of the 1985 massacre near the Duncan Village Cemetery.
