= East London, South Africa =

City in Eastern Cape, South Africa

East London: eMonti (Xhosa); Oos-Londen (Afrikaans)
- City
- KuGompo City
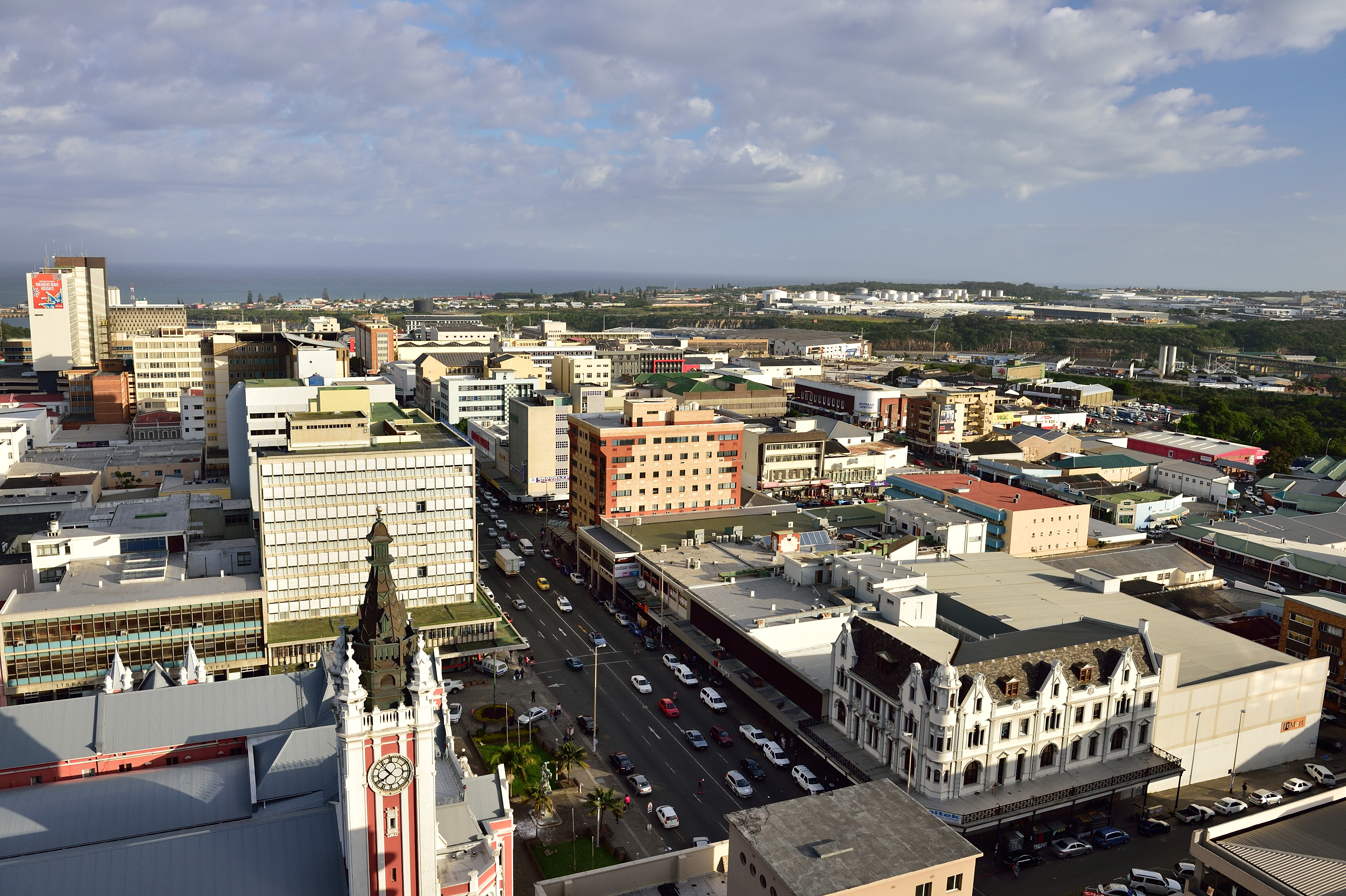
- East London, looking toward the sea

- Location within Eastern Cape Location within South Africa Location within Africa
- Coordinates: 33°01′03″S 27°54′17″E
- Country: South Africa
- Province: Eastern Cape
- Municipality: Buffalo City
- Established: 1847; 179 years ago

Area
  - City: 168.86 km^{2} (65.20 sq mi)
  - Metro: 2,536 km^{2} (979 sq mi)

Population (2011)
  - City: 267,007
  - Density: 1,581.2/km^{2} (4,095.4/sq mi)
  - Metro: 755,200
  - Metro density: 297.8/km^{2} (771.3/sq mi)

Racial makeup (2011)
  - Black African: 70.1%
  - Coloured: 11.6%
  - Indian/Asian: 1.8%
  - White: 16.0%
  - Other: 0.5%

First languages (2011)
  - Xhosa: 61.8%
  - English: 21.2%
  - Afrikaans: 13.3%
  - Other: 3.8%
- Time zone: UTC+2 (SAST)
- Postal code (street): 5200
- PO box: 5201–5499
- Area code: 043
- Website: kugompocity.co.za

East London (Xhosa: eMonti; Afrikaans: Oos-Londen), officially KuGompo City since February 2026, is a city in the Buffalo City Metropolitan Municipality of the Eastern Cape Province, on the southeastern coast of South Africa. The city lies on the Indian Ocean coast, largely between the Buffalo River and the Nahoon River, and hosts the country's only river port. As of 2011, East London had a population of over 267,000 with over 755,000 in the surrounding metropolitan area.

== History ==
=== Early history ===
John Bailie, one of the 1820 Settlers, surveyed the Buffalo River mouth and founded the town in 1836. There is a memorial on Signal Hill commemorating the event. The city formed around the only river port in South Africa and was originally known as Port Rex. Later it was renamed London in honour of the capital city of the United Kingdom, hence the name East London. This settlement on the West Bank was the nucleus of the town of East London, which was elevated to city status in 1914.

During the early to mid-19th century frontier wars between the British settlers and the local Xhosa inhabitants, East London served as a supply port to service the military headquarters at nearby King William's Town (now Qonce), about 50 km (31 mi) away. A British fort, Fort Glamorgan, was built on the West Bank in 1847, and annexed to the Cape Colony that same year. This fort is one of a series of British-built forts, including Fort Murray, Fort White, Fort Cox, Fort Hare, Fort Jackson and Fort Beaufort, in the border area that became known as British Kaffraria.

With later development of the port came the settlement of permanent residents, including German settlers, most of whom were bachelors. These settlers were responsible for German names of some towns in the vicinity of East London such as Stutterheim and Berlin. Today, German surnames such as Gehring, Salzwedel and Peinke are still common in East London, but the descendants of the settlers rapidly became Anglicised.

The existing port, in the mouth of the Buffalo River, adjoining the Indian Ocean, began operating in 1870. In 1872, the Cape Colony, under the leadership of its first Prime Minister John Molteno, attained a degree of independence from Britain. The new government merged the three neighbouring settlements of East London, East London East and Panmure in 1873, forming the core of the current municipality, and in 1876 it began construction on the region's railway lines, commencing on the river's east bank. At the same time, it began construction of the East London harbour. This new infrastructure rapidly accelerated development of the area into today's thriving city of East London.

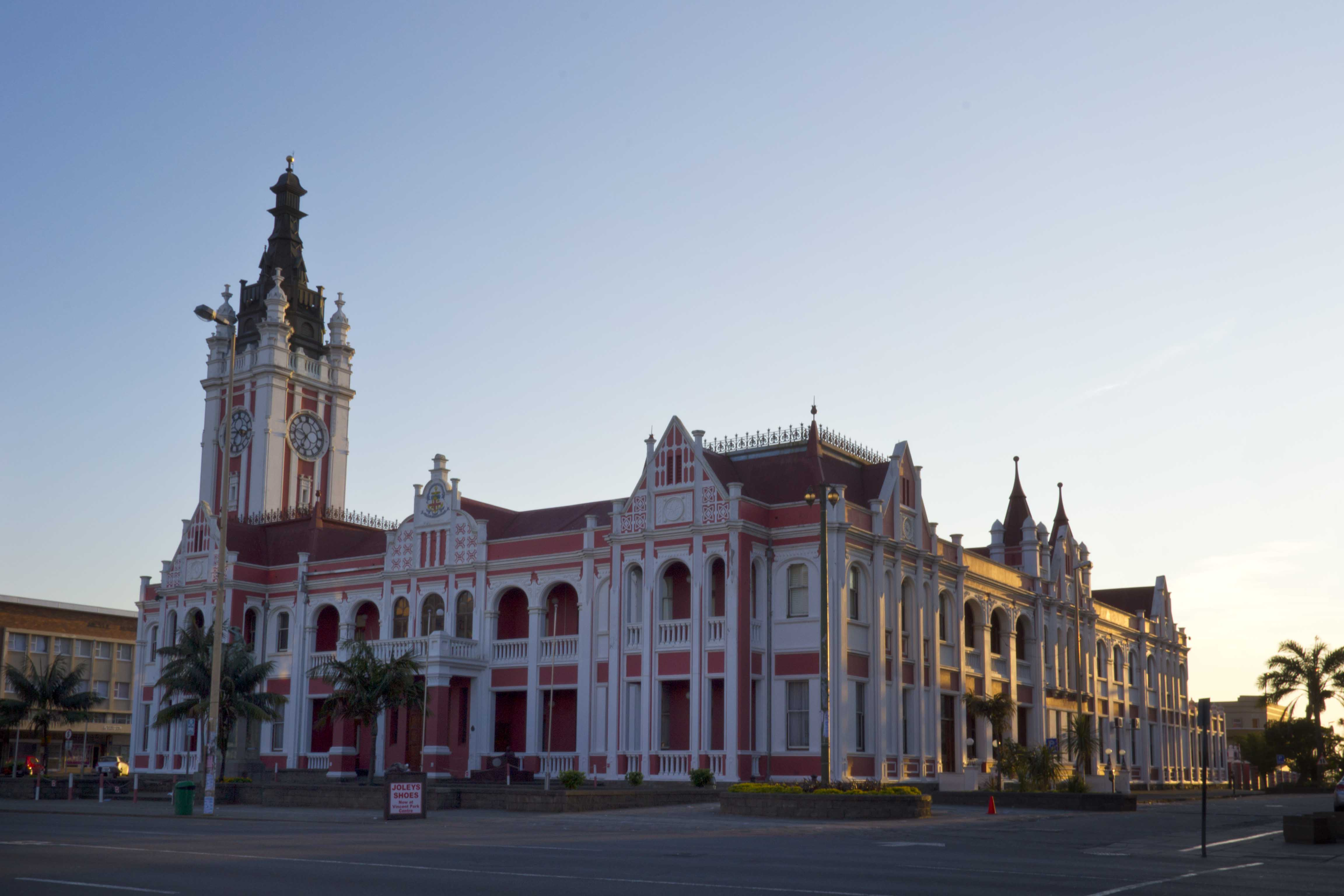
East London City Hall on Oxford Street

The unusual double-decker bridge over the Buffalo River was completed in 1935, and to this day is the only bridge of its type in South Africa. Modern day attractions include the Gately House, City Hall, Cape Railways, Nahoon Museum, East London Museum housing the coelacanth, a prehistoric fish, thought to be extinct, discovered live at the Chalumna River mouth near East London by fishermen in 1938, and numerous memorial statues.

=== Apartheid era ===
In 1948, the National Party came to power in South Africa, and began to implement the policy of apartheid. Apartheid as a doctrine envisaged the total segregation of races in South Africa, and East London was no different. In 1950, the Group Areas Act was placed upon the statute books making absolute segregation in all urban areas mandatory. In 1951, the Land Tenure Advisory Board, the body created to enforce the act, conducted initial investigations into the reallocation of space along racial lines in East London. Residential segregation had long been practised in East London prior to the advent of apartheid. In 1941, the East London Municipality moved residents from East Bank townships to the newly built township of Duncan Village.

In 1951, all inter-racial property exchanges were prohibited in East London. In 1955, the Amalinda area was zoned as a White Group Area by Government Gazette Proclamation number 21. This meant that the municipality's plans to extend the area in order to accommodate the Black African population were abandoned. In 1953, residents in the East Bank were forcibly moved to the new township of Mdantsane. In February 1966, the South African government defined Mdantsane as a separate homeland township. In 1956, Prime Minister Hendrik Verwoerd, forbade the East London municipality from extending the existing Duncan Village township and sanctioned the building of Mdantsane.

In 1961, these plans provided for the allocation of a distinct wedge of the city for Asian and Coloured residence, which "incorporated the areas of North End and the recently proclaimed Buffalo Flats location. This plan occasioned tremendous resentment in the city prompting petitions and letters of complaint from numerous organisations including the Black Sash, trade unions and various Black community groups. In 1967, the East London Municipality proclaimed the majority of the city an area for White occupancy, with the exception of a broad sector of land encompassing the Parkside, Parkridge and Buffalo Flats areas which was zoned for Coloured residence. Certain parts of Duncan Village were abolished and its African residents removed, new coloured and Asian locations were built and proclaimed upon land in 1973. In the same year, the newly constructed location of Braelynn was proclaimed an Indian area while Buffalo Flats Extension and Pefferville were proclaimed as Coloured areas. The construction/ extension of Coloured areas and the Duncan Village were suspended in 1983.

=== Post-apartheid ===
At the end of apartheid in 1994, East London became part of the province of Eastern Cape. In 2000, East London became part of Buffalo City Metropolitan Municipality, also consisting of King William's Town, Bhisho and Mdantsane and is the seat of the Metro.

In 2018, it was proposed for East London to be renamed to KuGompo. The name was not accepted due to the city already having a neighbourhood named Gompo. It was proposed again in 2020 and 2024 for the city to be renamed. In January 2026, Minister of Sport, Arts and Culture Gayton McKenzie approved changing East London's official name to KuGompo City after public consultations. The name change became official in February 2026. The name is said to be derived from the sound of waves crashing against the Gompo Rock, a sacred site for the Xhosa. Adding the word 'city' is what was used to distinguish the name of the city from the neighbourhood of Gompo, thereby resolving the issue that previously led to the name change being rejected.

== Geography and climate ==
East London

Climate chart (precipitation, max. and min. temperature)
J	F	M	A	M	J	J	A	S	O	N	D
69 26 18	92 26 19	105 25 18	83 24 15	52 23 13	40 21 11	47 21 10	78 21 11	80 21 12	102 22 14	110 23 16	63 25 17
- █ Average max. and min. temperatures in °C
- █ Precipitation totals in mm
- Source: SAWS
Imperial conversion
J	F	M	A	M	J	J	A	S	O	N	D
2.7 79 64	3.6 79 66	4.1 77 64	3.3 75 59	2 73 55	1.6 70 52	1.9 70 50	3.1 70 52	3.1 70 54	4 72 57	4.3 73 61	2.5 77 63
- █ Average max. and min. temperatures in °F
- █ Precipitation totals in inches

East London has an oceanic climate (Köppen Cfb), bordering on a humid subtropical climate (Köppen Cfa), with the warm temperatures and moderation typical of the South African coastline. Although it has no true dry season, there is a drying trend in the winter, with the wettest times of year being spring and autumn. There is also a shorter and lesser dry period in December and January.

The all-time record low is 3 °C (37.4 °F), and the all-time record high is 44 °C (111.2 °F) on 13 March 2021. The hottest temperatures have been recorded in springtime and autumn, rather than the summer months, due to violent berg (foehn) winds. Temperatures above 38 °C (100 °F) have only been recorded early in the season, from August to December. Berg winds contribute to these high temperatures, as already warm air from the arid interior is further heated through compression as it drops over the escarpment to sea level.

Climate data for East London (1991–2020, extremes 1939–1990)
Month	Jan	Feb	Mar	Apr	May	Jun	Jul	Aug	Sep	Oct	Nov	Dec	Year
Record high °C (°F)	36.4 (97.5)	42.6 (108.7)	44.0 (111.2)	35.9 (96.6)	37.0 (98.6)	32.8 (91.0)	34.3 (93.7)	37.5 (99.5)	41.7 (107.1)	41.4 (106.5)	40.3 (104.5)	38.2 (100.8)	44.0 (111.2)
Mean daily maximum °C (°F)	25.9 (78.6)	26.3 (79.3)	25.5 (77.9)	24.0 (75.2)	23.2 (73.8)	21.9 (71.4)	21.5 (70.7)	21.6 (70.9)	21.6 (70.9)	22.4 (72.3)	23.4 (74.1)	24.7 (76.5)	23.5 (74.3)
Daily mean °C (°F)	22.1 (71.8)	22.5 (72.5)	21.5 (70.7)	19.6 (67.3)	18.0 (64.4)	16.3 (61.3)	15.9 (60.6)	16.3 (61.3)	17.0 (62.6)	18.2 (64.8)	19.4 (66.9)	21.0 (69.8)	19.0 (66.2)
Mean daily minimum °C (°F)	18.3 (64.9)	18.7 (65.7)	17.5 (63.5)	15.1 (59.2)	12.8 (55.0)	10.7 (51.3)	10.2 (50.4)	11.0 (51.8)	12.3 (54.1)	14.0 (57.2)	15.3 (59.5)	17.2 (63.0)	14.4 (57.9)
Record low °C (°F)	9.0 (48.2)	11.0 (51.8)	10.3 (50.5)	7.2 (45.0)	4.4 (39.9)	2.6 (36.7)	1.8 (35.2)	3.1 (37.6)	5.0 (41.0)	5.9 (42.6)	8.5 (47.3)	8.4 (47.1)	1.8 (35.2)
Average precipitation mm (inches)	89 (3.5)	72 (2.8)	93 (3.7)	89 (3.5)	39 (1.5)	32 (1.3)	42 (1.7)	55 (2.2)	56 (2.2)	81 (3.2)	98 (3.9)	76 (3.0)	822 (32.4)
Average precipitation days (≥ 1.0 mm)	9.0	8.2	8.2	7.4	3.6	2.9	3.3	5.0	5.3	8.1	8.9	9.0	79
Average relative humidity (%)	80	82	82	78	72	66	67	71	77	78	80	80	76
Mean monthly sunshine hours	221.3	203.8	212.6	210.1	224.9	223.5	229.3	238.3	221.3	211.5	211.8	214.4	2,622.8
Source 1: NOAA (humidity 1961–1990), Deutscher Wetterdienst (extremes)
Source 2: South African Weather Service

== Demographics ==
East London is the second-largest city in the Eastern Cape (after Gqeberha), with a metro population of 755,200 as of 2011. English is the first spoken language in the city and Xhosa is the second language spoken.

Gender	Population
Male	140,505
Female	155,400

Race	Population
Black African	211,581
White	42,780
Coloured	35,090
Asian	4,732
Other groups	1,632

Languages	Population
Xhosa	179,600
English	54,504
Afrikaans	34,742
Sign Language	1,680
Zulu	1,663
Sotho	1,234
Ndebele	869
Tswana	618
Northern Sotho	558
Tsonga	379
Venda	168
Other languages	3,200

== Economy ==
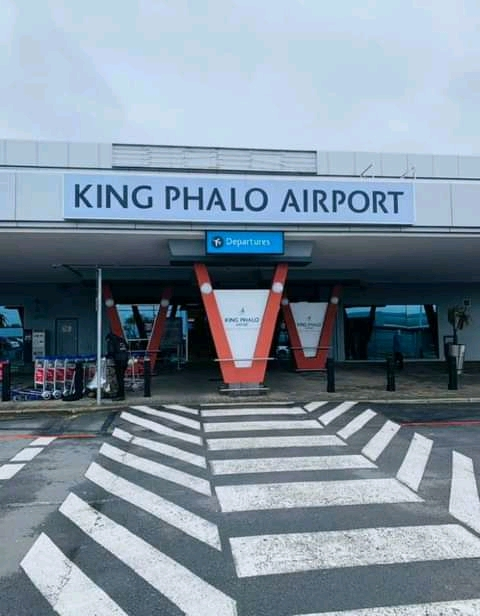
King Phalo Airport

East London is the second largest industrial centre in the province. The motor industry is the dominant employer. A major Daimler plant is located next to the harbour, manufacturing Mercedes-Benz and other vehicles for the local market, as well as exporting to the United States and Brazil. Other industries include clothing, textiles, pharmaceuticals and food processing.

The period of international sanctions that followed in the 1980s damaged the economy of East London's harbour. Enormous investment in recent years, by corporations such as Daimler AG, has resulted in the harbour being developed to include a new car terminal.

From the 1960s until the 1990s, the apartheid government created tax and wage incentives to attract industries to the then black "independent states", including nearby Ciskei. Investment thus flowed into surrounding areas such as Fort Jackson and Dimbaza, leaving East London in relative isolation.

East London International Convention Centre

To encourage investment in East London, the East London Industrial Development Zone (IDZ) was established on the West Bank in 2004, close to both the port and airport. 1500ha of land has been made available, and the site is one of four duty-free development areas in South Africa.

== Suburbs ==
- Quigney
- Abbotsford
- Southernwood
- Belgravia
- Amalinda
- Winchester
- Chiselhurst
- Beacon Bay
- Berea
- Arcadia
- North End
- Beaconhurst
- Nahoon
- Stirling
- Woodleigh
- Bunkers Hill
- Bonnie Doon
- Vincent
- Baysville
- Selborne
- Cambridge
- Morningside
- Saxilby
- Braelyn
- Parkridge
- Parkside
- Peffersville
- Buffalo Flats
- Bebelele
- Gately
- West Bank Village
- Brookville
- Sunnyridge
- Rosemount
- Fullers Bay
- Siyakha
- Collondale
- Willow Park
- Haven Hills
- Highway Gardens
- Scenery Park
- Wilsonia
- Dorchester Heights
- Quenera
- Gonubie
- Duncan Village
- Gompo

== Sports ==
Soccer is popular in the city. East London was home to the Blackburn Rovers, prior to its sudden dissolution in 2014. As of 2025, Premiership team Chippa United host some of their games in the city.

Cricket is popular around East London. A combined Border/Eastern Province cricket side known as the Warriors take part in the top provincial competition. Former Proteas wicketkeeper Mark Boucher who as of July 2023 holds the Test record for most dismissals by a wicketkeeper hails from East London. Buffalo Park Stadium in East London hosted a match during the ICC Cricket World Cup in 2003 and two matches of the 2009 Indian Premier League.

The Buffalo Road Running Club of East London has created two established events that have gained international recognition. They are the Old Mutual Buffalo 42,2 km marathon, which is held in February/March each year, and South Africa's oldest 160 km extreme ultra marathon, the Washie, over a picturesque and undulating coastal route from Port Alfred to the city.

Triathlon is a popular sport and in particular hosted the a world-famous Ironman 70.3 South African event which took place annually in January from 2012 to 2021. Ironman 70.3 events follow a race format which consists of a 1.9 km swim, 90 km of cycling and a 21.1 km road run. The event started and finished at the Orient Beach in East London. In November 2021, the Buffalo City Ironman 70.3 event was cancelled in favour of the new Mossel Bay Ironman 70.3 event.

Rugby is popular in East London. The provincial team, the Border Bulldogs, currently plays in the First Division of the Currie Cup competition. Most national games in East London are played at the Buffalo City Stadium, which holds around 15000 people and was a host stadium during the 1995 Rugby World Cup. East London schools have produced many fine rugby players, including (in recent times) André Vos, Keith and Mark Andrews, Christiaan Scholtz, Brent Russell, Rory Kockott, Akona Ndungane and Odwa Ndungane.

Motocross is also popular and many national events are held in the area surrounding East London, due to the challenging terrain there and in Transkei. East London is home to the ELMCC (East London Motor Cycle Club), which organises most of the motorcycle events in the area.

East London is home to the Prince George Race Circuit, opened in 1959 (renamed East London Grand Prix Circuit), a historic motor racing track that hosted three Formula One South African Grand Prix during the 1930s and 1960s. The circuit is run and managed by Border Motor Sport Club on a shoestring budget. South Africa's only Formula One World Drivers' Champion, Jody Scheckter, started his motor racing career with a Renault Gordini on this track.

Golf is another favoured pastime in and around East London. East London Golf Club is a highly regarded championship golf course. Some of the other golf clubs in the region are the West Bank Golf Club, Gonubie Golf Club, Olivewood Golf Estate and Fish River Sun Country Club (a Gary Player-designed golf course). East London has also hosted the Africa Open tournament multiple times. Golfers can also hone their skills at the East London Golf Club Driving Range.

Rowing is on the Buffalo River. The annual Buffalo Regatta began in 1881 and has become the largest in South Africa: in 2018 there were 1000 competitors participating in 200 events over three days.

Surfski is ideally suited to East London. The Port Elizabeth to East London Challenge organized by East London's Border Canoe club is 244 km long, often in extremely challenging conditions, takes place every second year, attracting competitors from around the world. It began in 1972 to see who was faster, ultra-distance runner John Ball over land, or surf lifesaver John Woods over water. John Ball won.

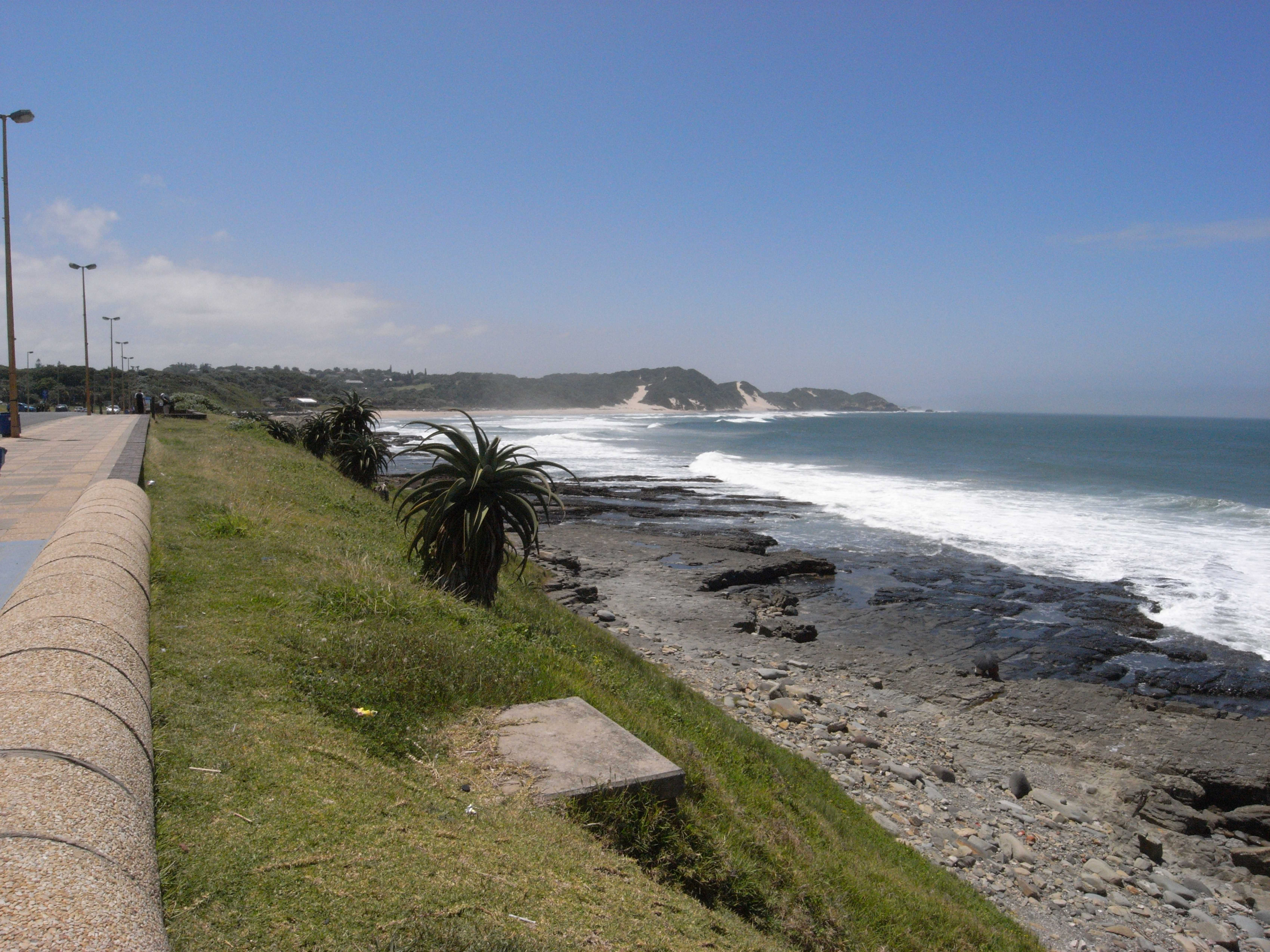
East London Esplanade

Surfing is popular in East London. It is home to some of South Africa's top surfers, including Greg Emslie, former World Championship Tour surfer, ISA World Masters Champion, five-time South African Men’s Champion and coach to Olympic silver medalist Bianca Buitendag, Andre Malherbe, and up-and-comer Zoe Steyn. Nahoon Reef, located in the suburb of Nahoon is a famous South African surf spot and is the site of the annual Nahoon Surf Pro (formerly Buffalo City Surf Pro). The city has also hosted the South African Surfing Championships on numerous occasions and even the ISA World Surfing Championship.

== Education ==
=== Secondary education ===
- Clarendon High School for Girls
- Hudson Park High School
- Port Rex Technical High School
- Selborne College
- Stirling High School
- West Bank High School
- George Randell High School

=== Tertiary education ===
- University of Fort Hare
- Walter Sisulu University
- University of South Africa (UNISA)

There are also a few private colleges.

== Points of interest ==
Other points of interest include:

- East London Museum
- Inkwenkwezi Private Game Reserve
- Amathole Museum
- Hood Point Lighthouse
- East London Coast Nature Reserve

== Transport ==
East London is serviced by two national roads, the N2 and the N6. The coastal N2 highway connects it to Qonce, Makhanda, Gqeberha and Cape Town to the west and Mthatha and Durban to the east. The N6 runs north via Komani and Aliwal North to Bloemfontein. Older sections of the N2 have been renumbered the R102. The R72 is an alternative route to Gqeberha, via Port Alfred. East London, like South Africa's other major cities, uses Metropolitan (or M) routes as a third tier for its major intra-city roads.

East London railway station offers long-distance passenger services to Cape Town and Johannesburg via Springfontein, and local services.

King Phalo Airport is a commercial airport with service to other large South African metropolitan areas.

== Notable people ==
- Anthony Clifford Allison, geneticist and medical scientist
- Mark Andrews, rugby player
- Masali Baduza, actress
- Wendy Botha, four-time world surfing champion
- Mark Boucher, international cricketer
- Vuyani Bungu, boxer
- Jean-Michel Byron, singer with American rock band Toto in the 1980s
- Donald Card, politician
- Norman Catherine, artist
- Marjorie Courtenay-Latimer, museum curator who discovered a living coelacanth, a fish that was previously thought to have been extinct for millions of years
- Colin Cowie, Hollywood events planner
- Hlomla Dandala, actor
- Mackay Davashe, saxophonist and composer
- Ryan de Villiers, actor
- The Dealians, 1970s pop group
- Mobi Dixon, musician and DJ
- Jacques Goosen, rugby player
- Allan Gray, investor and philanthropist
- Joan Harrison, swimmer and 1952 Olympic champion
- Rory Kockott, rugby player
- Jacob Maliekal, national badminton player who represented South Africa at the Rio Olympic Games in 2016
- Makazole Mapimpi, 2019 & 2023 Rugby World Cup winner
- Lana Marks, South African-American fashion designer and former United States Ambassador to South Africa
- Msaki, singer-songwriter and composer
- Tats Nkonzo, comedian
- Makhaya Ntini, test cricketer with over 100 caps for the South African national team
- Masande Ntshanga, novelist
- Steve Palframan, cricketer
- David E. Potter, founder of Psion
- Jahmil X.T. Qubeka, film director
- Malcolm Ronaldson, cricketer
- Soso Rungqu, actress
- Ian Scheckter, racing driver
- Jody Scheckter, racing driver, winner of the Formula One World Drivers' Championship in 1979
- Jonty Skinner, swimmer and US swimming coach
- John Gordon Sprigg, prime minister of the Cape Colony
- Jarrod Taylor, rugby player
- Wayne Taylor, racing driver
- André Vos, rugby player
- Wouter Wessels, senior FF+ politician
- Donald Woods, author and anti-apartheid activist; born in Transkei
- Zahara, musician, songwriter
- Elias Charalambous, football player and coach

== Coat of arms ==
The East London municipality assumed a coat of arms on 29 August 1892. The arms were: Argent, a cross Gules between in the first and fourth quarters a garb and in the second and third quarters a fleece Or; on a chief Azure a demi-sun Or. A golden anchor was placed behind the shield, no doubt to show that the town was a seaport. The motto was Animo et fide.

The arms were improved in the 1950s by the town clerk, H.H. Driffield. He changed the shield from silver to ermine, removed the anchor and devised a crest consisting of two crossed anchors and a mural crown. Heraldist Ivan Mitford-Barberton added two buffalo as supporters. The improved design was granted by the College of Arms on 15 December 1959. It was registered with the Cape Provincial Administration in 1960, and at the Bureau of Heraldry in 1967.
