= Daily Dispatch =

South African newspaper

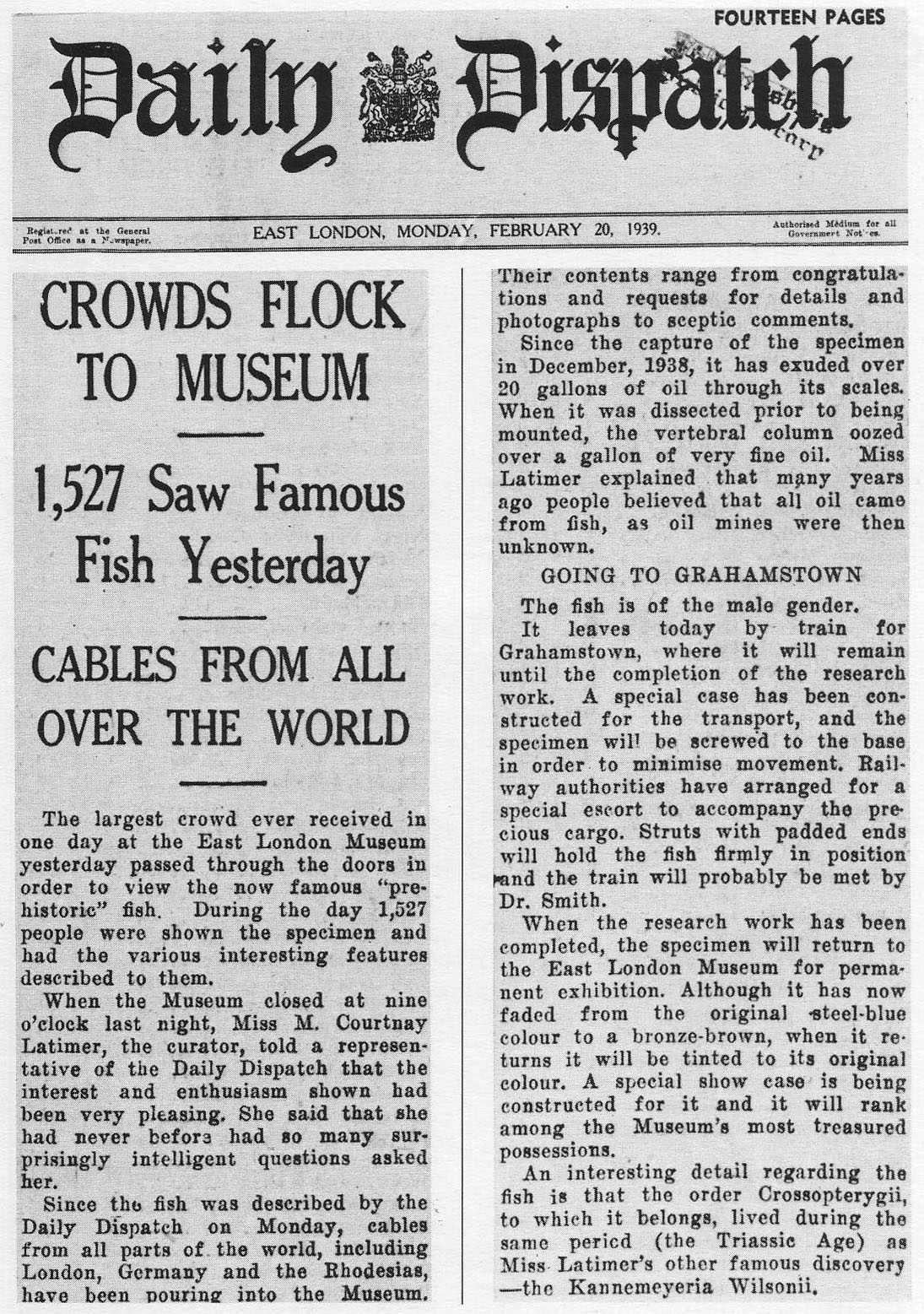
- Daily Dispatch front page of 20 February 1939
- Type: Daily newspaper
- Owner: Arena Holdings
- Publisher: Arena Holdings
- Editor: Cheri-Ann James
- Founded: 1872
- Language: English
- Headquarters: East London
- Website: www.dispatchlive.co.za

The Daily Dispatch is a South African newspaper published in East London in the province of Eastern Cape.

The weekend edition is titled Daily Dispatch Weekend Edition.

Founded in 1872 as the East London Dispatch and Shipping and Mercantile Gazette, the Daily Dispatch is the Eastern Cape's best-selling daily with a circulation of about 26,147 copies as of the first quarter in 2015. The online offering is known as DispatchLIVE.

The newspaper, published in English, is well known for its hard-hitting investigative reporting and also covers Eastern Cape news, sports, politics, business, jobs, and community events.

It has consistently been South Africa's best-performing daily newspaper, in terms of circulation growth, for the last several years.

The newspaper is internationally known for its editor from 1965 to 1977, Donald Woods. Woods became a friend of Steve Biko, leader of the Black Consciousness Movement, and provided support to Biko through his editorials. After Biko's death in police custody, Woods went into exile to expose the truth surrounding Biko's death in his book Biko.

During World War II the editor, and major shareholder, was Bernard Steer, father of noted journalist George Steer.

== History ==
The History of the Daily Dispatch by Glyn Williams

== Distribution areas ==
Distribution
	2008	2013
Eastern Cape	Y	Y
Free State		
Gauteng		
Kwa-Zulu Natal	Y	Y
Limpopo		
Mpumalanga		
North West		
Northern Cape		
Western Cape		Y

== Distribution figures ==
Circulation
	Net Sales
Jan – Mar 2015	26 147
Jan – Mar 2014	30 199
Oct – Dec 2012	26 339
Jul – Sep 2012	26 390
Apr – Jun 2012	26 751
Jan – Mar 2012	30 304

== Readership figures ==
Estimated Readership
	AIR
12 Jan – 12 Dec	238 000
11 Jul – 12 Jun	237 000

== Location ==
The newspaper's physical address is:
35 Caxton Street, East London, South Africa, 5201

== See also ==
- List of newspapers in South Africa
