= Costa Gazi =

South African anti-apartheid activist (1936–2025)

- Born: 23 July 1936; Krugersdorp, South Africa
- Died: 19 March 2025 (aged 88)
- Occupations: Medical doctor, politician

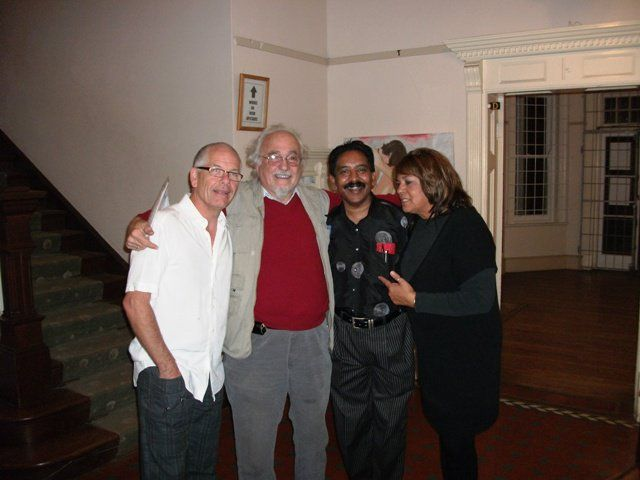
Pan African Congress leader Comrade Costa Gazi with Dr Amitabh Mitra 25 November 2020 at a solo exhibition of Amitabh Mitra at the Ann Bryant Art Gallery, East London, South Africa

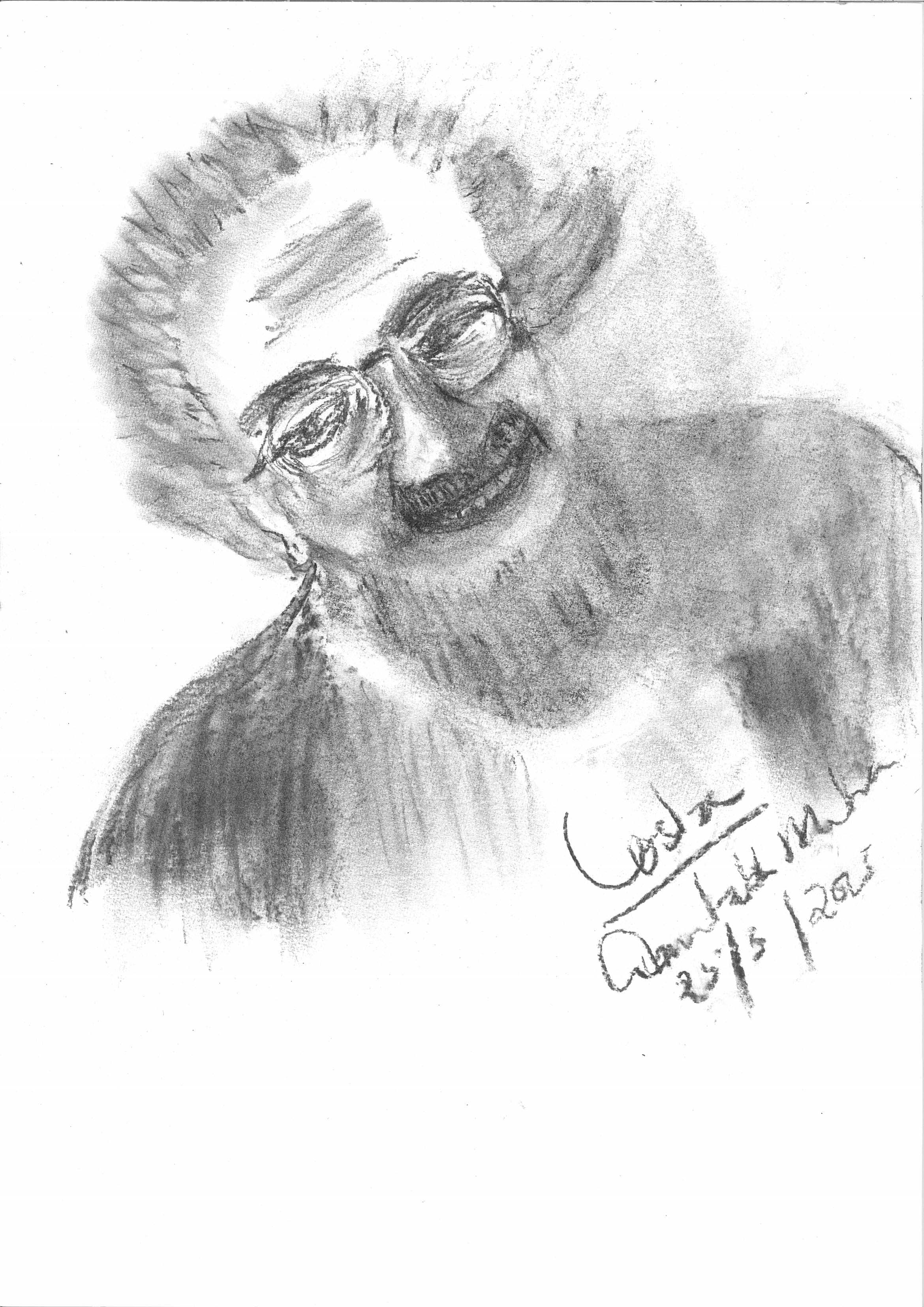
Comrade Costa Gazi Charcoal on Paper by Amitabh Mitra

Costa Gazi (23 July 1936 – 19 March 2025) was a South African anti-apartheid activist in the underground South African Communist Party (SACP) and later the Pan Africanist Congress of Azania (PAC), both of which were illegal organisations. Post-apartheid, he has worked as head of public health at Cecilia Makewane Hospital in Mdantsane, East London, South Africa, where he criticized the policies of the ruling African National Congress (ANC), notably the AIDS denialism of then-President Thabo Mbeki. Gazi died on 19 March 2025, at the age of 88.

== Early life and education ==
Gazi's family, of Greek extraction, ran a small shop or "cafe" in Krugersdorp, where he worked as a boy. A star student at Krugersdorp High School, he enrolled in the University of the Witwatersrand at the age of 16, to study civil engineering but switched to a medical degree. Impressed by the then-illegal The Communist Manifesto, and radicalized by the Sharpeville massacre, he joined the Congress of Democrats and the underground South African Communist Party.

== Exile, move to the PAC, and post-apartheid role ==
Jailed in 1964, and banned from political activity in 1966, Gazi went abroad in 1968 to further his studies, and left the SACP over its support for the crushing of the Prague Spring by the Union of Soviet Socialist Republics in 1968. He moved to the PAC, an unusual step as the PAC had almost no white members, and was widely regarded as a violently anti-white party.

Gazi returned to South Africa in 1990, standing unsuccessfully as a PAC candidate in the 1994 elections. Post-apartheid he achieved notoriety after being stabbed at a PAC rally by a member who targeted him because he was white, and then for defying government orders banning the use of anti-retroviral medicines. At the time he served as public health secretary for the PAC. As a result, he faced disciplinary charges by the Eastern Cape provincial health department, most of which were thrown out of court.

== Cecilia Makiwane Hospital ==
Gazi was a specialist and headed the Department of Community Medicine from 1992 onwards and actively participated in Primary Health Care in Mdantsane. His department sent every day two medical doctors to the rural clinics. Hè actively involved himself in the demand for Anti Retro Virals for the community with AIDS. Dr Gazi confronted the government media for misleading the country, by not allowing the dispensation of Anti Retro Virals in South Africa. He financed from his own pocket the use of anti retrovirals in pregnant HIV positive women in Cecilia Makiwane Hospital. ART-managed HIV is now considered a preferred diagnosis because it is seen as easier to manage, more responsive to medication, and less dangerous compared to diseases like cancer, hypertension and diabetes. Dr Gazi is the pioneer in bringing Anti Retro Virals for prophylaxis in Rape and Sexual Assaults and carrying a healthy life in people with AIDS in South Africa. Dr Costa Gazi gave full support and empathy to the South African Foreign Qualified Doctors who are still being treated not at par with their colleagues who are trained in South African Universities. Such a rule by the Health Professions Council of South Africa, is still being engaged for doctors who have been working in South African for more than twenty years. The commonwealth policy to which South Africa is signatory does not follow commonwealth laws.
