= Alfred Mtsi =

South African politician (c. 1950–2020)

Speaker of the Buffalo City council
- In office 2016 – 12 July 2020

Mayor of Buffalo City
- In office June 2015 – August 2016
- Preceded by: Zukiswa Ncitha

Member of the Eastern Cape Provincial Legislature
- In office 1999–2014

Personal details
- Born: Skuta Alfred Mtsi c. 1950–1951
- Died: 12 July 2020 East London, Eastern Cape
- Party: African National Congress; South African Communist Party
- Spouse: Nolundi
- Children: 3
- Education: University of Fort Hare; University of South Africa; University of the Witwatersrand

Skuta Alfred Mtsi (c. 1950–1951 – 12 July 2020) was a South African politician who served as the mayor of Buffalo City, South Africa. Prior to his mayoral tenure he served as a member of the Eastern Cape Provincial Legislature and later served as the Speaker of the Buffalo City council before his death.

== Early life ==
Skuta Alfred Mtsi was born in c. 1950–1951 and grew up in Ncerha Village, outside of East London. He attended Hebron Primary School, Mzimkhulu Higher Primary and Gcisa Commercial High School. He was expelled from school in 11th grade for attending an "illegal gathering" with 19 other students.

He graduated with a Master's degree in public administration and an advanced certificate in public administration and management from the University of Fort Hare, a certificate in governance and leadership from the University of South Africa, and a certificate in advanced governance and public leadership from the University of the Witwatersrand.

== Career ==
Mtsi became involved in politics during the Soweto uprising in 1976. In 1983, he started working for Mercedes-Benz. In 1989, he served as a shop steward of NUMSA. In 1991, he served as chairman of COSATU and served as chairman of COSATU in the Border Region from 1992 to 1993.

=== Politics ===
In 1990, Mtsi became a member of the African National Congress and the South African Communist Party. He served as a member of the Eastern Cape Provincial Legislature from 1999 to 2014.

In June 2015, Mtsi was inaugurated as Mayor of Buffalo City, South Africa to fill the vacancy created by Zukiswa Ncitha's resignation. He served until August 2016. In 2016, Mtsi was elected to serve as Speaker of the Buffalo City council.

== Death ==
On 7 July 2020, Mtsi was hospitalized at the Life Beacon Bay Hospital in East London after contracting COVID-19 during the COVID-19 pandemic in South Africa. He died on 12 July. Mtsi was the third member of the Buffalo City council to die from the disease after Zukiswa Mankayi and Gideon Norexe.

== Electoral history ==
2016 Buffalo City council speaker election
Party	Candidate	Votes	%
ANC	Alfred Mtsi	62	68.9%
DA	Jan Smit	28	31.1%
Total votes		90	100%
