= Zukisa Faku =

South African politician and convicted fraudster

Member of the National Assembly of South Africa
- In office 21 May 2014 – 5 July 2019
- Succeeded by: Princess Faku

Permanent Delegate to the National Council of Provinces from the Eastern Cape
- In office 25 April 2013 – 6 May 2014

Personal details
- Born: 1965 (age 60–61) Duncan Village, South Africa
- Party: African National Congress
- Profession: Politician

Zukisa Cheryl Faku (born 1965) is a South African politician and convicted fraudster from the Eastern Cape. A member of the African National Congress, Faku had served as the mayor of the Buffalo City Local Municipality. In 2013 she was elected to take up a seat in the National Council of Provinces. The following year, she was elected to the National Assembly of South Africa. Faku was convicted of fraud in 2016 but remained a Member of Parliament. She resigned from parliament shortly after her re-election in 2019.

== Early life ==
Faku was born in Duncan Village outside East London in 1965. When she was five years old, she and her family were forced to relocate to the Mdantsane township due to the Group Areas Act instituted by the white minority government. She later trained to be a teacher and worked as one until she became involved in politics.

== Political career ==
Faku was an ANC councillor and served as the mayor of the Buffalo City Local Municipality until the 2011 municipal elections. In April 2013, Faku was selected to go to the National Council of Provinces, the upper house of the South African parliament, to fill the casual vacancy that arose following the resignation of Siphiwo Mazosiwe. A year later, Faku was elected to the lower house of parliament, the National Assembly, in that year's general elections. She was appointed to both the Portfolio Committee on Mineral Resources and the Portfolio Committee on Energy, of which she was made whip.

In March 2016, Faku was convicted on nine counts of fraud and theft‚ stemming from her tenure as mayor when she used her official municipal credit card for personal purchases while on business trips to Turkey and within South Africa in 2009. Faku maintained that she was unaware that she was not allowed to use the credit card for private purchases. In September, Faku was sentenced to three years of house arrest and community service at an old-age home in Cambridge. The ANC welcomed her sentencing with ANC chief whip Jackson Mthembu saying that Faku could no longer continue serving as an MP because of her criminal conviction.

Faku then began a process of appealing the ruling and continued serving as an ANC MP until the 2019 general election where she was re-elected to a second term in the National Assembly. Faku was then named the ANC's nominee for chairperson of the Portfolio Committee on Basic Education, but her nomination was later withdrawn and the former Northern Cape MEC for Sports, Arts and Culture Bongiwe Mbinqo-Gigaba was selected to be committee chairperson. Faku resigned from Parliament on 5 July 2019, less than two months after the election, after the ANC forced her to resign despite her ongoing appeals process. The Democratic Alliance, the official opposition in parliament, called for a probe into how Faku was elected as an ANC MP in the May election, in spite of her fraud conviction.
