= Dimbaza =

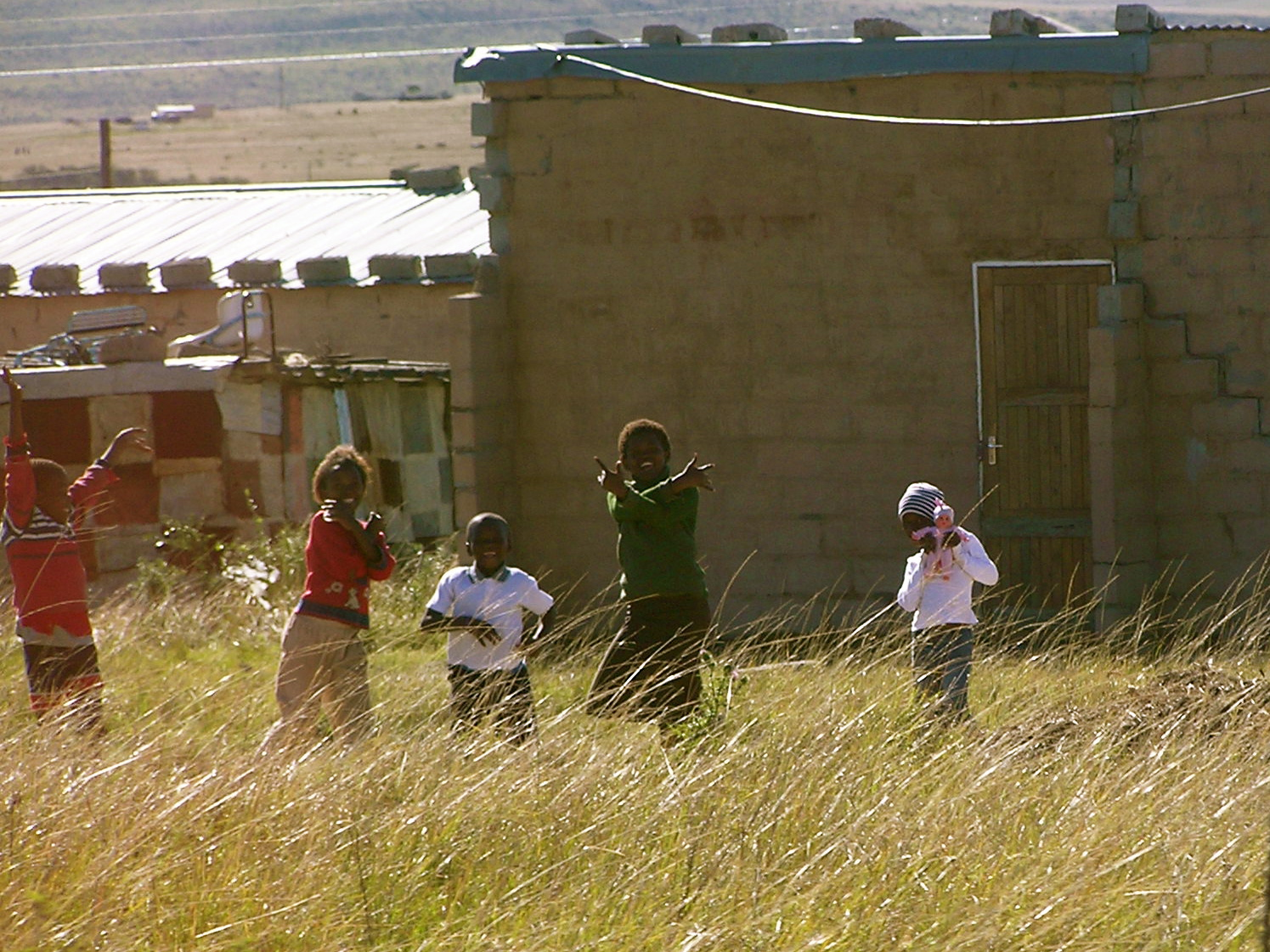
- Dimbaza, taken by Valerie Hinojosa

- Location within Eastern Cape Location within South Africa Location within Africa
- Coordinates: 32°50′7″S 27°12′57″E
- Country: South Africa
- Province: Eastern Cape
- Municipality: Buffalo City

Area
  - Total: 17.28 km^{2} (6.67 sq mi)
- Elevation: 580 m (1,900 ft)

Population (2011)
  - Total: 21,783
  - Density: 1,261/km^{2} (3,265/sq mi)

Racial makeup (2011)
  - Black African: 99.4%
  - Coloured: 0.2%
  - Indian/Asian: 0.1%
  - Other: 0.3%

First languages (2011)
  - Xhosa: 91.6%
  - English: 5.1%
  - Other: 3.3%
- Time zone: UTC+2 (SAST)
- Postal code (street): 5671
- PO box: 5671
- Area code: 040

Dimbaza is a township in the Eastern Cape province of South Africa, located in the Buffalo City Metropolitan Municipality, 20 kilometres (12 mi) northwest of Qonce, formerly known as King William's Town, on the R63 road to Alice and Fort Beaufort. As of 2011, it had a population of 21,783.

== History ==
Dimbaza, which was originally known as Mnxesha, was created as a rural resettlement township, "an apartheid dumping ground", in November 1967. The first people to settle in Dimbaza arrived in trucks in November 1967 and early 1968, with a rapid increase in numbers between December 1968 and February 1969. By March 1969, the Minister of Bantu Administration and Development (BAD) M.C Botha put the population at 2,897, of whom 2,041 were children. The numbers had increased to 3,400 by May. By 1971, the population was sitting at around 7,000, and by 1972 it had reached almost 10,000. Over half of the households in Dimbaza after the resettlement were headed by women. Dimbaza was also used as a dumping ground for ANC and PAC ex-prisoners. Banned Dimbaza residents who were ex-political prisoners included: Ernest Tshazimbane, Moses Bonisile Twebe, Jack Madikane, Walter Cola and Daniel Mafenuka.

The first settlers in Dimbaza were housed in tin-roofed wooden huts measuring 16’ x 16’, and ten feet high which had no floors, ceilings and foundations. Rent was fixed at £1.71 per month for a two-roomed house leaving 85% of the population unable to afford to rent the houses. A few four-roomed houses, which accommodated privileged individuals such as teachers, were built. In 1972, a clinic was built in the area. The first primary school opened in March 1969, and by 1972 there were four primary schools and one secondary school. In describing the conditions in Dimbaza in the late 1960 to early 1970s, clergyman Rev David Russell said "the overall reality of a place like Dimbaza is its grinding poverty and the helplessness of the great majority of its inhabitants to do anything about improving their lot....The fundamental question is work. At another level the question is why they were removed there at all."

The apartheid government was forced to bring in reforms and improve the infrastructure. Housing amenities were improved and settling into the area was voluntary after 1971. After Ciskei gained its independence, Dimbaza was part one of its large township. After the fall of apartheid in 1994, the township became part of the Eastern Cape.

== Economy ==
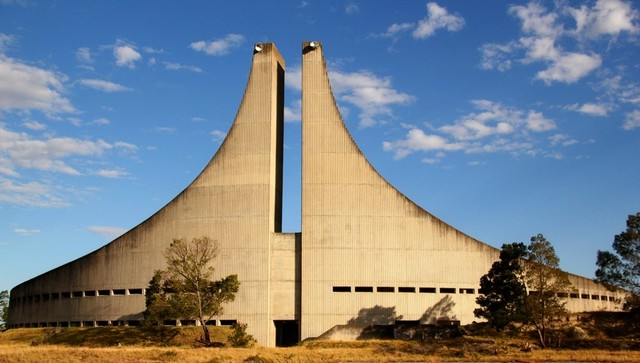
Ntaba kaNdoda National Monument

To encourage investors to move into the area, rebates on power and water, and wage bill subsidies were offered in the 70s', and after Ciskei gained 'independence' as a homeland in 1981, a flat 15% tax rate was charged. In 2016, the Eastern Cape government announced that R344-million had been set aside for the establishment of an industrial hub in Dimbaza.
