= Eluxolweni =

- Location within Eastern Cape Location within South Africa
- Coordinates: 32.9136°S 27.7569°E
- Country: South Africa
- Province: Eastern Cape
- Municipality: Buffalo City

Area
  - Total: 2.41 km^{2} (0.93 sq mi)

Population (2011)
  - Total: 2,620
  - Density: 1,090/km^{2} (2,820/sq mi)

Racial makeup (2011)
  - Black African: 100%

First languages (2011)
  - Xhosa: 97.3%
  - English: 1.0%
  - Other: 1.3%
- Time zone: UTC+2 (SAST)

Eluxolweni is an informal settlement situated next to the N2 freeway, just north of Mdantsane. It falls under the Buffalo City Metropolitan Municipality in the Eastern Cape province of South Africa.
