= Cecilia Makiwane =

South African nurse (1880–1919)

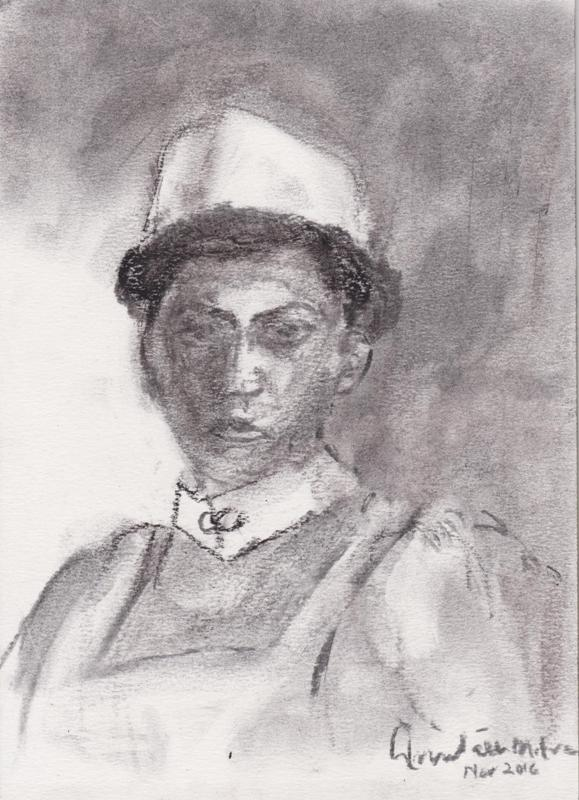
- Cecilia Makiwane, Charcoal on Paper by Amitabh Mitra
- Born: 1880; Macfarlane Mission, Victoria District, Alice, Eastern Cape, South Africa
- Died: 1919 (39 years); Thaba 'Nchu, Free State, South Africa
- Occupation: Registered nurse
- Relatives: Noni Jabavu (niece)

Cecilia Makiwane (1880–1919) was the first African registered professional nurse in what would become South Africa and an early activist in the struggle for women's rights.

== Early life ==
Cecilia Makiwane was born in 1880 at the MacFarlane Mission in Victoria East, a district about 10 km away from Alice in what was the Cape Colony. Her father was Reverend Elijah Makiwane, a pioneering clergyman and the second Black minister ordained in the Presbyterian Church, who was trained in South Africa. Her mother Maggie Majiza was an assistant teacher at a girls' school in Alice. Maggie died in 1883 when Cecilia was two years old. Her parents had three children: Daisy (born 1878), Cecilia (born 1880) and Ashton (born 1882). Cecilia attended the Lovedale Girls' School where she obtained a teacher's certificate.

Her niece Noni Jabavu became a well-known novelist.

== Education ==
The Victoria Hospital, the first mission hospital in South Africa, opened in 1898 and closed during the Boer War. The hospital reopened in 1903 and launched a three-year nurse training programme in the same year. In 1907, Mina Colani and Makiwane both enrolled and received a Hospital Proficiency Certificate after three years. Makiwane enrolled for a further year of training and passed the Cape Colonial Medical Council examination on 19 December 1907. She became the first Black woman to be a licensed by the state as a registered professional nurse in Africa in January 1908. When she received her licence, the only other women of colour who were recognised as registered nurses were Maori women in New Zealand.

== Nursing in South Africa ==
Bantu nursing was introduced with the growing need for Xhosa people in King William’s Town to have nurses who shared their cultural background. This led to Makiwane qualifying as a professional nurse in 1908. At the time, only 6 per cent of Black women in the country could read and write. Only those with nine to 10 years of schooling could register. Makiwane had nine years of schooling before she started the training course. The lack of adequate schooling for Black people hindered many from entering the field which required to pass a written examination in English or Afrikaans.

In 1910, the government started training more Black women. Under colonial rule, the Transvaal and the Orange Free State commenced nurse training for Black women in the 1930s and 1950s, respectively. Other mission hospitals also trained more Black women in order to provide healthcare in rural areas. The field was only gradually opened to Black women with 255 Black nurses training nationwide in 1937. By the 1940s, there were only about 800 registered Black nurses in the country. By 1990, of the approximately 15,000 nurses who were registered with the South African Nursing Council, about two-thirds were people of colour.

== Activism ==
Makiwane took part in the Bloemfontein anti-pass campaign and on 28 May 1913 was one of 200 women led by Charlotte Maxeke who marched on the Bloemfontein Mayor's office. In this campaign, a petition was signed by some 5,000 African and mixed-ancestry women in the Free State. It was sent to Louis Botha demanding for the pass laws to be repealed.

== Retirement ==
She resumed work with the Lovedale Hospital and served the hospital until she was granted long leave due to ill health.

== Death and legacy ==
After leaving Lovedale, she joined her sister, Majombozi in Thaba 'Nchu, where she eventually died in 1919 at the age of 39.

The South African Nursing Association c.1965 annually awarded a 'Cecilia Makiwane Gold Medal' to the 'Bantu' nurse who obtained the highest marks but not less than 75% of the total in the final exam for General Nurses.

In 1970, more than 2,000 people, including nurses of the Natal Midland African Branch of the South African Nursing Association, assembled in St. Augustine's Mission Church, Edendale, Pietermaritzburg, to commemorate Makiwane's registration.

A statue of Cecilia Makiwane, sculpted by Jack Penn, was unveiled by the nurses of South Africa at the Victoria Hospital (Alice) in Lovedale on 7 May 1977. It was funded by nurses. It was mounted on a granite plinth, a short distance to the north of the 1939 Macvicar Hospital Building and still intact in 2025.

A postage stamp was issued in 1982 to honour local heroine Cecilia Makiwane by the short-lived republic "Ciskei", now known as the Eastern Cape.

In 1977, the Mdantsane Hospital in the Eastern Cape was renamed Cecilia Makiwane Hospital; the "new" Cecilia Makiwane Hospital was officially opened by the Deputy President of South Africa Cyril Ramaphosa on the 17 September 2017.

The Cecilia Makiwane Nurse's Recognition Award for health care professionals, introduced by the South African government in 2002 was still being annually awarded in 2025.

== See also ==
- Noni Jabavu (niece)
- Cecilia Makiwane Hospital
