= Need's Camp =

- Location within Eastern Cape Location within South Africa
- Coordinates: 32.9979°S 27.6471°E
- Country: South Africa
- Province: Eastern Cape
- Municipality: Buffalo City

Area
  - Total: 7.41 km^{2} (2.86 sq mi)

Population (2011)
  - Total: 6,696
  - Density: 904/km^{2} (2,340/sq mi)

Racial makeup (2011)
  - Black African: 99.6%
  - Coloured: 0.1%
  - Indian/Asian: 0.1%
  - Other: 0.1%

First languages (2011)
  - Xhosa: 96.0%
  - English: 2.0%
  - Other: 2.0%
- Time zone: UTC+2 (SAST)

Need's Camp is a settlement in Buffalo City in the Eastern Cape province of South Africa.
