= Mzamomhle, Buffalo City =

Mzamomhle
- Location within Eastern Cape Location within South Africa
- Coordinates: 32.9554°S 27.9877°E
- Country: South Africa
- Province: Eastern Cape
- Municipality: Buffalo City

Area
  - Total: 2.49 km^{2} (0.96 sq mi)

Population (2011)
  - Total: 8,338
  - Density: 3,350/km^{2} (8,670/sq mi)

Racial makeup (2011)
  - Black African: 99.1%
  - Coloured: 0.2%
  - Indian/Asian: 0.1%
  - White: 0.1%
  - Other: 0.4%

First languages (2011)
  - Xhosa: 95.1%
  - English: 2.2%
  - Other: 2.7%
- Time zone: UTC+2 (SAST)
- PO box: 5258

Mzamomhle is a settlement in Buffalo City in the Eastern Cape province of South Africa.
