= Khulani =

Khulani may refer to:

- Khulani Hadebe, South African politician
- Khulani Commercial High School
