= Mayor of Buffalo City =

- Incumbent; Princess Faku since 23 March 2023
- Style: The Honourable
- Seat: 117 Oxford Street, Cnr North & Oxford Streets, Trust Centre, East London
- Appointer: Buffalo City Council
- Term length: Five years; renewable once
- Formation: 2011
- Website: Official website

The Mayor of Buffalo City, officially the Executive Mayor of the Buffalo City Metropolitan Municipality, is the head of local government of South Africa's Buffalo City Metropolitan Municipality.

Buffalo City was established as a local municipality part of the Amathole District Municipality in 2000; at the 2011 municipal elections the municipality became a metropolitan municipality.

== List of mayors ==
=== 2000–2011: Mayors of the Buffalo City Local Municipality ===
Name	Term of office		Political party	Ref.
Sindisile Maclean	2000	2006	African National Congress	
Ntombentle Peter	2006	2008	African National Congress	
Sakhumzi Caga (acting)	2008	2009	African National Congress	
Zukisa Faku	2009	2011	African National Congress	

=== 2011–present: Mayors of the Buffalo City Metropolitan Municipality ===
Name	Term of office		Political party	Ref.
Zukiswa Ncitha	2011	2015	African National Congress	
Alfred Mtsi	2015	2016	African National Congress	
Xola Pakati	2016	2023	African National Congress	
Princess Faku	2023	Incumbent	African National Congress	
