= Zukiswa Ncitha =

South African politician

Delegate to the National Council of Provinces

Assembly Member for Eastern Cape
- In office 17 June 2015 – 28 May 2024

Mayor of Buffalo City
- In office 31 May 2011 – June 2015
- Preceded by: Position established
- Succeeded by: Alfred Mtsi

Personal details
- Born: New Brighton, Cape Province; South Africa
- Party: African National Congress
- Other political affiliations: South African Communist Party

Zukiswa Veronica Ncitha is a South African politician from the Eastern Cape. She was the inaugural Executive Mayor of Buffalo City Metropolitan Municipality between May 2011 and June 2015. After that she represented the African National Congress (ANC) in the National Council of Provinces from June 2015 to May 2024.

In June 2014, while serving as mayor, Ncitha was arrested in connection with the alleged misappropriation of public funds designated for former President Nelson Mandela's funeral. The ANC removed her from the mayoral office, transferring her to Parliament, a year later. Her trial on charges of fraud and corruption was ongoing as of 2024.

A former union activist in the Eastern Cape, Ncitha rose to prominence as a regional leader of the Congress of South African Trade Unions (Cosatu). She served on the Central Committee of the South African Communist Party (SACP) from 2007 until 2012.

== Early life and career ==
Ncitha was born in New Brighton in Port Elizabeth in the former Cape Province. She rose to political prominence through the trade union movement as a regional leader of the ANC-allied Cosatu. In 1990, she was elected as Cosatu's convenor on gender issues in the Border region, and in 1994 she was seconded to the Office of the Eastern Cape Premier to help establish the provincial government's Office on the Status of Women.

She was elected to the executive of the Women's National Coalition in 1999 and was a founding member of the Progressive Women's Movement in 2006. She also served one term as a member of the Central Committee of the SACP from 2007 to 2012.

== Mayor of Buffalo: 2011–2014 ==
Until 2011, Ncitha represented the ANC as a local councillor and council speaker in Amathole District Municipality. On 31 May 2011, following the 2011 local elections, she was elected as Executive Mayor of the newly established Buffalo City Metropolitan Municipality. She served in that office until June 2015.

In June 2014, Ncitha was arrested in connection with an investigation by the Hawks into the alleged misuse of public funds that had been designated for the funeral of former President Nelson Mandela, who died in December 2013. She and several other Buffalo City officials, including her deputy Themba Tinta, were charged with fraud and money laundering. In June 2015, while the charges against her were pending, the ANC removed Ncitha from her post as Buffalo Mayor; she was succeeded by Alfred Mtsi.

== National Council of Provinces: 2015–2024 ==
Directly after removing Ncitha from the mayoral office, the ANC deployed her to a seat in the National Council of Provinces, where she was sworn in on 17 June to fill a casual vacancy. She was re-elected after the 2019 general election.

After the ANC codified its step-aside rule for public representatives facing criminal charges, Ncitha volunteered to step aside from her parliamentary seat, meaning that she would recuse herself from her party duties and would not represent the ANC in parliamentary proceedings. However, in June 2021, the Sowetan reported that Ncitha continued to chair committee meetings and participate in plenaries. She remained in her parliamentary seat until after the May 2024 general election.

== Fraud trial ==
After various delays in the proceedings, Ncitha's fraud trial was ongoing in 2024. She pled not guilty.
