= Chief Mqalo =

Alphin Mbuso Mqalo
- Chief of the AmaKhuze Tribe, Alice
- Reign: November 1966 – 30 November 2006
- Coronation: 1 December 1966
- Predecessor: Nqweniso George Mqalo
- Successor: Khayalethu Mqalo Ah! Gcinisizwe
- Born: October 10, 1916; Makhuzeni, Alice, Cape Colony, South Africa
- Died: 1 August 2008 (aged 91)
- Spouse: Dinah Masiza; Ncebakazi Dana
- Issue: Children: Khayalethu Mqalo; Nomanono Mqalo (Nabo); Lindisipho Mqalo; Nomtha Mqalo; Ntobeko Mqalo; Vuyokazi Mqalo (Dala) (d. 2015); Busiswa Mqalo (d. 2000); Grandchildren include: Zwelandile Mqalo; Ntombesizwe Mqalo; Sibulele Mqalo; Siyanda Mqalo; Loyiso Mqalo; Thembelani Mqalo; Liso Mqalo; Siyavuya Mqalo; Bukeka Mqalo; Namhla Mqalo; Lunathi Mqalo; Qaqamba Nabo (d. 2008); Lungelo Nabo; Sandisiwe Nabo; Simamkele Dala; Yolisanani Dala; Bongumsa Dala; Sibabalwe Mqalo
Names
- Alphin Mbuso Mqalo
- House: AmaKhuze Great Place
- Father: Nqweniso George Mqalo
- Mother: Esther Nowasi Khathangana

Chief Mbuso Alphin Mqalo (10 October 1916 – 1 August 2008) was the chief of the Amakhuze Tribe in Alice, South Africa and the oldest chief of the Rharhabe Kingdom. His reign was from the early 1960s to 2006.

In 1973, he became a member of the Ciskei National Assembly (Parliament) as a member of the ruling party, the Ciskei National Independent Party (CNIP). On the 17 May 1976, he became a member of the Ciskei cabinet for the position of Minister of Justice. In 1977, he was elected to Minister of Health and after 1978, when Ciskei became a one-party state, he became the Whip of the CNIP. During his term as Minister of Health he was prominent in the renaming of the Mdantsane Hospital to the Cecilia Makiwane Hospital, to commemorate Cecilia Makiwane, the first Black nurse in South Africa. In 1978 he was a director of CTC Bus Company Ltd.

== History of the Amakhuze ==
The Amakhuze Tribe originated from Zulu land but in 1834 they escaped and went westward to the Transkei to escape the Mfecane. Mqalo crossed the Great Kei River and moved to Port Elizabeth, Fort Beaufort and in 1830 to Makhuzeni Location-(Around 1830 they arrived in the Tyume valley, which at that time was still controlled by the Ngqika Xhosa. According to the current Chief, Mqalo and his group were given permission to settle in the valley by Chief Tyali, son of Ngqika and brother of Maqoma. The area became their tribal area called Makhuzeni and Mqalo subsequently became their chief. Prior to the arrival of Mqalo and his people, the Makhuzeni region must have looked different. Mqalo, the father of the current chief, subdivided and allocated the Makhuzeni area to different groups, and a number of settlements, located close to each other, were established. This subdivision was overseen by the colonial administration. In addition to Guquka, these settlements included the present-day villages of Gilton, Msompondo and Mpundu. To this day, the people of these villages share the same communal rangelands. Mqalo originally established more settlements, including Kwezana, whose residents were later relocated by betterment planners to one of the other villages between 1930 and 1950, Alice in the Tyume River valley. The area has become their tribal area and is still called this. During their migration, migrants of other clans and tribes joined them in their search for a place to settle. This migration followed the expulsion of the Ngqika under paramount Chief Sandile after the 1850-1853 Frontier War. The British cleared the Tyume valley of Xhosa who had settled there before Upon arrival, Chief Mqalo began to allocate land to different groups in different parts of the landscape which explains the occurrence of the villages: Gilton, Guquka, Sompondo and Mpundu, Kwezana etc. Around 1830 they arrived in the Tyume valley, which at that time was still controlled by the Ngqika Xhosa. According to the current Chief, Mqalo and his group were given permission to settle in the valley by Chief Tyali, son of Ngqika and brother of Maqoma. The area became their tribal area called Makhuzeni and Mqalo subsequently became their chief. Prior to the arrival of Mqalo and his people, the Makhuzeni region must have looked different, Mqalo, the father of the current chief, subdivided and allocated the Makhuzeni area to different groups, and a number of settlements, located close to each other, were established. This subdivision was overseen by the colonial administration. In addition to Guquka, these settlements included the present-day villages of Gilton, Msompondo and Mpundu. To this day, the people of these villages share the same communal rangelands. Mqalo originally established more settlements, including Kwezana, whose residents were later relocated by betterment planners to one of the other villages between 1930 and 1950

=== Genealogy ===
The Mqalo family tree:

Dlamini Wengqangi ka Cebisa
Many Generation
Mnyembane
Kuta
Nomagwala
Siqongweni
Lokothwayo
Lolwa
Lubiyela
Nhlonhlonde
Domo
Lusibalukhulu
Dlamini II
Khuze Mdineka
Sivunga
Dlomo
Nomagaga
Bulingwe
Mmiso
Khukuleka
Nomadolo
Mqalo
Nolesi	Skepe	Mantyi	Yantolo
George Mqalo	Nowasi Khathangana
Nontsikelelo	Nomalanga Maqubela	Mthobeli	Dinah Masiza	Alphin Mbuso Mqalo	Ncebakazi Dana	Nozipho	Nomatiba

== See also ==
- List of Xhosa Chiefs
