= Sunrise-on-Sea =

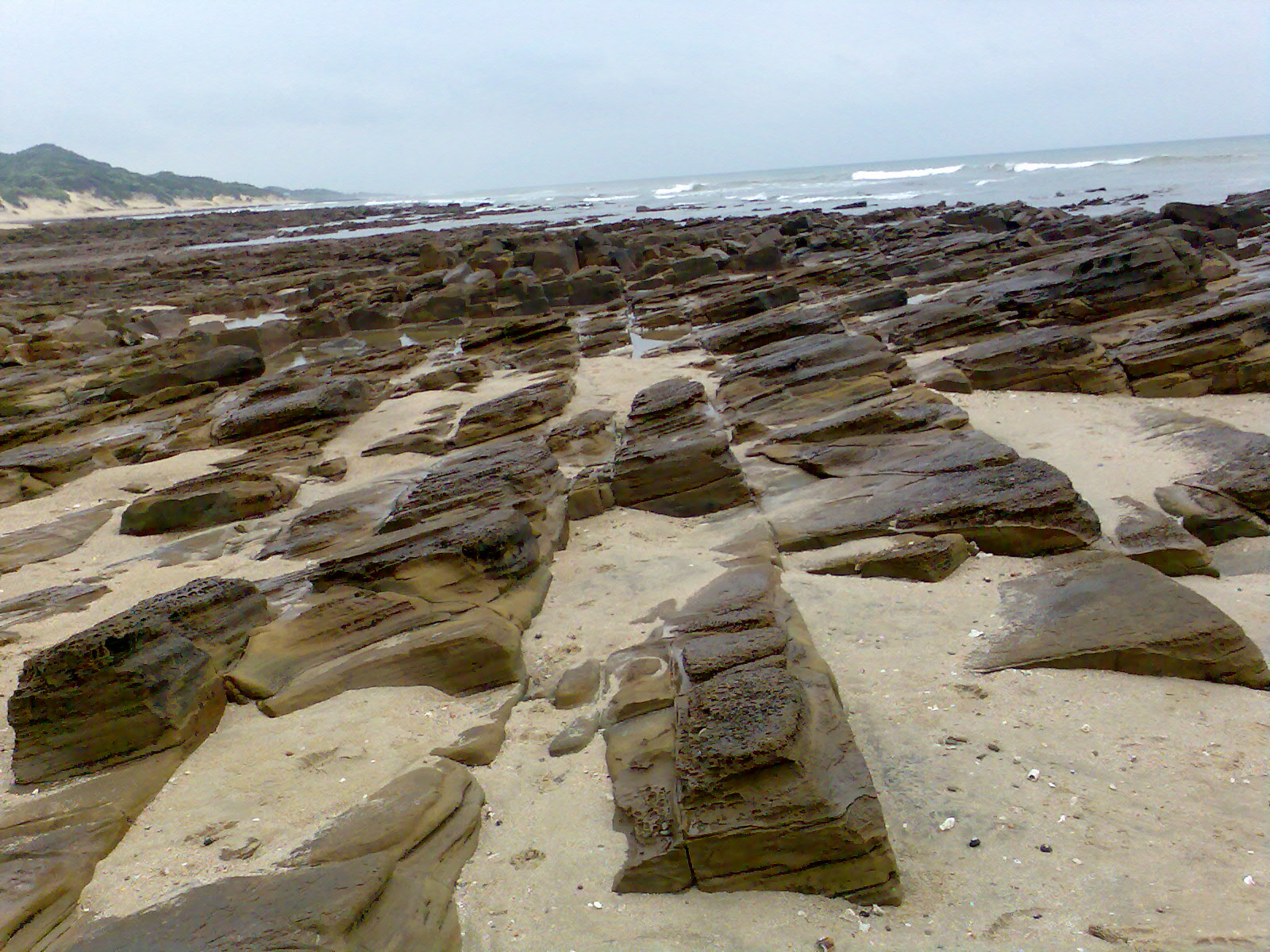
- Rocks at Sunrise-on-Sea

- Location within Eastern Cape Location within South Africa
- Coordinates: 32.919°S 28.051°E
- Country: South Africa
- Province: Eastern Cape
- Municipality: Buffalo City

Area
  - Total: 0.68 km^{2} (0.26 sq mi)

Population (2011)
  - Total: 655
  - Density: 960/km^{2} (2,500/sq mi)

Racial makeup (2011)
  - Black African: 8.1%
  - Coloured: 0.2%
  - White: 89.7%
  - Other: 2.0%

First languages (2011)
  - English: 73.5%
  - Afrikaans: 21.6%
  - Xhosa: 3.8%
  - Other: 1.1%
- Time zone: UTC+2 (SAST)

Sunrise-On-Sea is a village in Buffalo City Metropolitan Municipality in the Eastern Cape province of South Africa.
