= Princess Faku =

South African politician

Councillor Princess Faku

Mayor of the Buffalo City Metropolitan Municipality
- Incumbent
- Assumed office 23 March 2023
- Preceded by: Xola Pakati

Deputy Mayor of the Buffalo City Metropolitan Municipality
- In office 23 November 2021 – 23 March 2023
- Preceded by: Helen Neale-May

Member of the National Assembly of South Africa
- In office 1 August 2019 – 19 November 2021
- Preceded by: Zukisa Faku
- Succeeded by: Dr Mike Basopu
- Constituency: Eastern Cape

Personal details
- Born: 1981 or 1982
- Party: African National Congress
- Profession: Politician

Princess Faku (born 1981 or 1982) is a South African politician who has been mayor of the Buffalo City Metropolitan Municipality since March 2023. Prior to serving as Mayor, Faku had been a member of the National Assembly between 2019 and 2021 and was a Deputy Mayor from November 2021 to March 2023. Faku is a member of the African National Congress.

== Career ==
Faku joined the National Youth Development Agency in 2010 when the organisation merged with the Umsobomvu Youth Fund. She held multiple leadership positions in the agency, including the positions of senior business development officer and manager for eight out of the nine district offices the agency has in the Eastern Cape.

== Political career ==
As a member of the African National Congress, Faku served as the secretary of an ANC branch in the Buffalo City region and as treasurer of the party's youth league in the Eastern Cape. By 2019, she was a member of the National Executive Committee (NEC) of the youth league and a member of the Regional Executive Committee (REC) of the ANC.

== Parliamentary career ==
Faku stood for the National Assembly in the 2019 general election as 19th on the ANC province-to-national list. She was not elected at the election due to the ANC's electoral support declining in the Eastern Cape. Following the resignation of ANC MP Zukisa Faku (no relation) less than two months after the election, Faku was selected to take up her seat in Parliament. She was sworn into office on 1 August 2019. Faku later became a member of the Portfolio Committee on Police and an alternate member of the Portfolio Committee on Communications and Digital Technologies.

== Deputy Mayor of Buffalo City ==
In October 2021, Faku was listed as an ANC councillor candidate for the Buffalo City Metropolitan Municipality council for the local government elections of 1 November 2021. She was reportedly favoured to be the ANC's mayoral candidate for the metro after the elections. Following the elections, as the ANC retained their majority of seats on the council and Faku was elected as a councillor, she submitted her resignation as a Member of Parliament on 17 November 2021 amid rumours that she would be appointed the ANC's mayoral candidate. Nonetheless, incumbent mayor Xola Pakati was selected by the National Executive Committee of the African National Congress to be the party's candidate for mayor on 21 November reportedly over concerns that Faku did not have the proper qualifications as per the party requisite. At the inaugural council meeting on 23 November, Faku was elected deputy mayor to Pakati.

On 22 May 2022, at the ANC's Dr WB Rubusana regional elective conference, Faku was elected regional chairperson unopposed. She supported the provincial chairperson of the ANC in the Eastern Cape Oscar Mabuyane's unsuccessful campaign for ANC deputy president and lobbied delegates to support his campaign at the party's 55th National Conference in December 2022.

== Mayor of Buffalo City ==
On 8 March 2023, it was announced that the Provincial Working Committee of the ANC in the Eastern Cape had "recalled" Pakati as mayor of Buffalo City due to poor audit outcomes, wasteful expenditure and failure to collect revenue during his mayoral term. He resigned from office on 20 March 2023. Faku was elected mayor during a special council meeting on 23 March 2023, winning the position with 62 votes to the DA's Susan Bentley who received only 22 votes.
