= Ilitha =

- Location within Eastern Cape Location within South Africa
- Coordinates: 32.8936°S 27.5316°E
- Country: South Africa
- Province: Eastern Cape
- Municipality: Buffalo City

Area
  - Total: 5.64 km^{2} (2.18 sq mi)

Population (2011)
  - Total: 8,145
  - Density: 1,440/km^{2} (3,740/sq mi)

Racial makeup (2011)
  - Black African: 99.6%
  - White: 0.2%
  - Other: 0.2%

First languages (2011)
  - Xhosa: 95.1%
  - English: 2.4%
  - Other: 2.5%
- Time zone: UTC+2 (SAST)
- Postal code (street): 5606
- PO box: 5606
- Area code: 043

Ilitha is a township southwest of Ntabozuko, falling under the Buffalo City Metropolitan Municipality in the Eastern Cape province of South Africa.
