= Siba Mtongana =

South African chef

- Born: December 10, 1984 (age 41); East London, Cape Province, South Africa
- Education: Cape Peninsula University of Technology (BTech in Food and Consumer Science)
- Spouse: Brian Mtongana (m. 2010)
- Children: Lonwabo Mtongana; Linamandla Mtongana; Buhlebenkosi Mtongana; Ntandoyenkosi Mtongana
- Culinary career
- Cooking style: Traditional African, South African
- Current restaurants
- SIBA – The Restaurant; The Siba Deli
- Television shows
- Cooking with Siba; Siba's Table
- Website: sibamtongana.com

Sibahle Mtongana (/siˈbaːɬɛ əmˈtɔŋana/, born 10 December 1984) is a South African celebrity chef, restaurateur, television presenter, and author. Her restaurant, SIBA – The Restaurant, was founded in 2020, initially as a pop-up venue. She is best known for her freelance work at Drum Magazine, and the Cooking Channel and Food Network television series, Siba's Table.

== Early life ==
Mtongana grew up in the township of Mdantsane near East London, South Africa. She is the daughter of Noliza, a retired teacher and Mncedisi Mnwana, a retired supervisor of a leather goods manufacturer. She is the youngest in a family of six children. She did her schooling in Alphendale High School, where she matriculated in 2002, and enrolled for a degree in Food and Consumer sciences at the Cape Peninsula University of Technology, which she graduated in 2006.

== Career ==
Mtongana started as a student lecturer in CPUT, and made extra income by being an extra in several features films and TV commercials. She then served as a food editor for Drum Magazine for five years. During that time she made her television debut with the cooking show Cooking with Siba on Mzansi Magic in 2011.

== Filmography ==
Year	Title	Network	Notes/Air Dates	Ref.
2011	Cooking with Siba	Mzansi Magic	7 March 2011, advertiser-funded program co-produced with Drum Magazine	
2013	Siba's Table	Cooking Channel, Food Network	4 seasons,	
2014	Chopped South Africa	Food Network	Judge	

== Personal life ==
Siba is married to Executive Creative Director for Woolworths, Brian Mtongana. She and Brian have 4 children: Lonwabo, Linamandla, Buhlebenkosi & Ntandoyenkosi.
