= Khulani Commercial High School =

Location
- 9692 Bomela Rd; Mdantsane, Eastern Cape, 5219; South Africa
- Coordinates: 32.93846°S 27.76063°E

Information
- Type: Public High School
- Motto: 'We lead, others follow'
- Religious affiliation: Christian
- Established: c1976
- President: Zuka Zion
- Acting Head Master: Mrs S. Lubanga
- Staff: ~50 (full-time)
- Grades: 8–12
- Gender: Male & Female
- Age: 11 to 24
- Enrollment: ≈1000 pupils
- Colours: Black & white
- Nickname: Khulanian
- Website: matric2011.wordpress.com

Khulani Commercial High School is a secondary school that used to specialise in Commercial education. Since the introduction of National Curriculum Statement by the public department of basic education, the school was reintroduced as a general public secondary school without any specialisation. The school is based in Mdantsane (Buffalo City Metropolitan Municipality), Eastern Cape, South Africa.
