= Ntaba kaNdoda =

Monument in Dimbaza, South Africa

Coordinates: 32.8008°S 27.1298°E

National Monument of the Republic of Ciskei: Ntaba kaNdoda
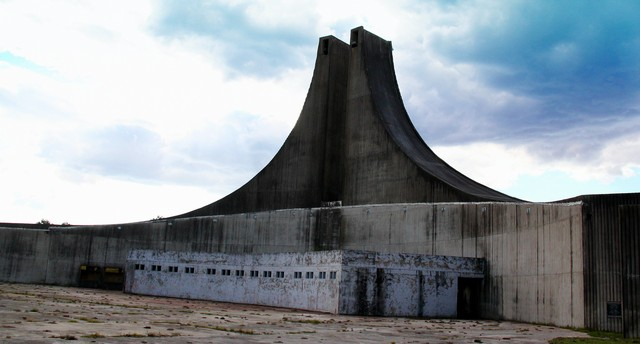
- Condition of the building in 2012
- Interactive map of National Monument of the Republic of Ciskei: Ntaba kaNdoda
- Location: Rhabhula, South Africa
- Opening date: August 14, 1981

The National Monument of the Republic of Ciskei: Ntaba kaNdoda is located in Dimbaza, South Africa. It was commissioned by President of Ciskei Lennox Sebe, and was opened by him on August 14, 1981. The memorial was created with the intention of commemorating those Xhosa chiefs who died in the dispute with the white colonizers over land use rights.

== Gallery ==
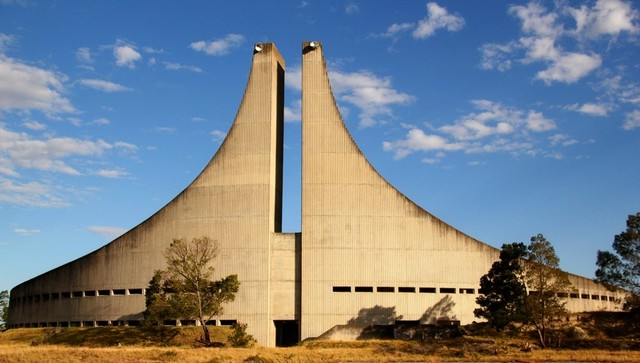
The monument of Ntaba KaNdoda

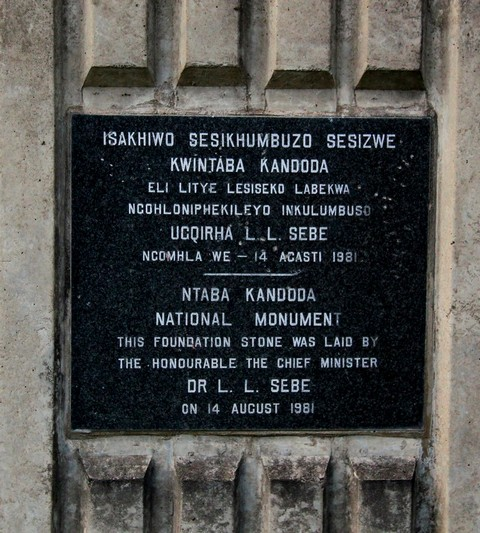
Inscription on the monument
