= Alice, South Africa =

Town in Eastern Cape, South Africa

Alice Dikeni
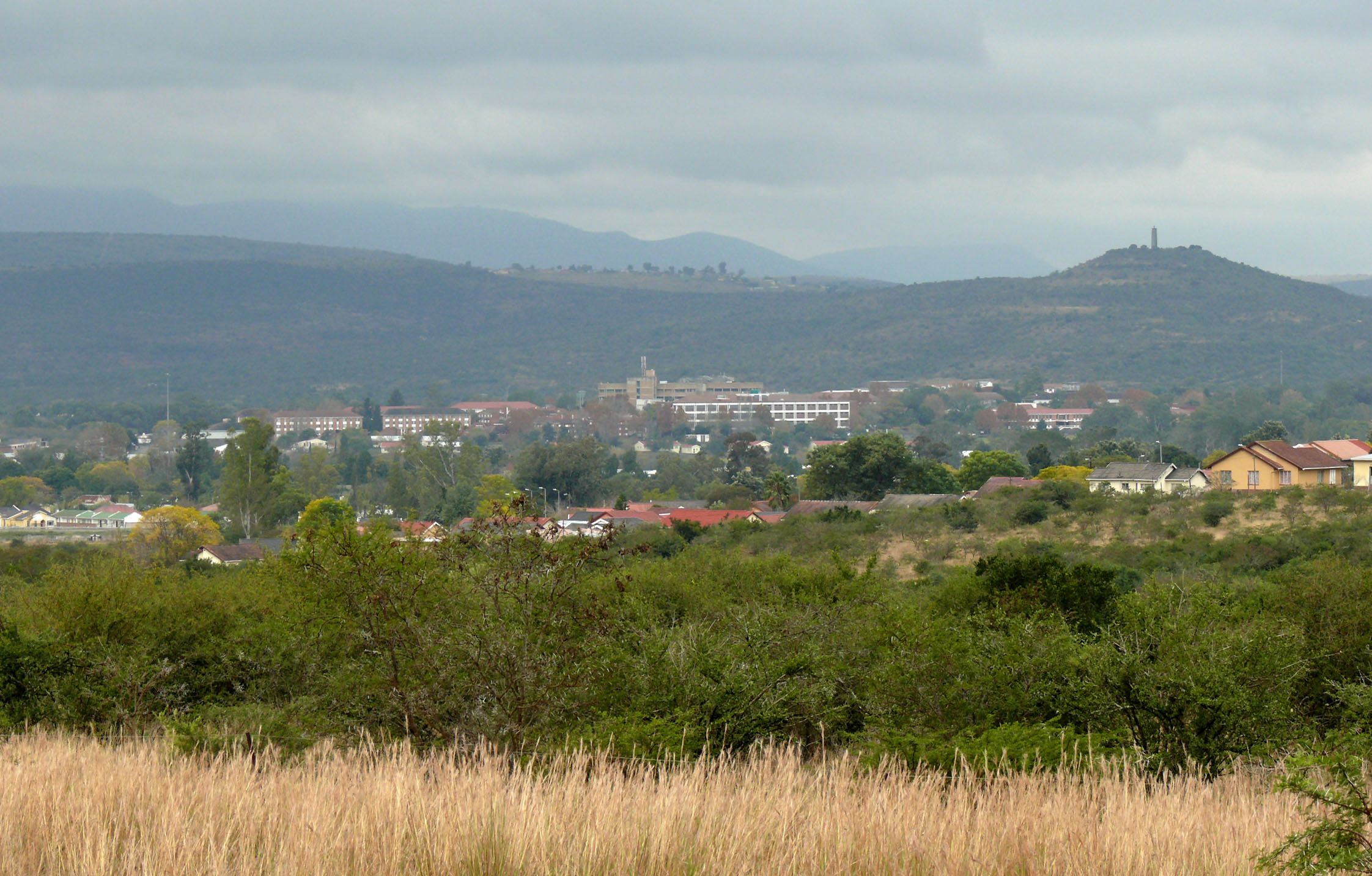
- Buildings of the University of Fort Hare in Alice
- Nickname: eDikeni
- Location within Eastern Cape Location within South Africa Location within Africa
- Coordinates: 32°47′21″S 26°50′06″E
- Country: South Africa
- Province: Eastern Cape
- District: Amathole
- Municipality: Raymond Mhlaba

Area
  - Total: 9.85 km^{2} (3.80 sq mi)

Population (2011)
  - Total: 15,143
  - Density: 1,540/km^{2} (3,980/sq mi)

Racial makeup (2011)
  - Black African: 93.0%
  - Coloured: 5.6%
  - Indian/Asian: 0.3%
  - White: 0.6%
  - Other: 0.5%

First languages (2011)
  - Xhosa: 84.0%
  - Afrikaans: 7.3%
  - English: 3.5%
  - Other: 5.2%
- Time zone: UTC+2 (SAST)
- Area code: 040

Alice, also known as Dikeni, is a small town on the R63 road in the Eastern Cape, South Africa, adjacent to the Tyhume River. The town serves as halfway between Qonce and KwaMaqoma. It is named after Princess Alice of the United Kingdom, the second daughter of the British Queen Victoria. In 1824, the town was settled by British Colonists. It forms part of Raymond Mhlaba Local Municipality.

== University of Fort Hare ==
The University of Fort Hare began in early 1847 as a fort built to house British troops. The same fort was converted in 1916 into a black university institution. Many of the current political leaders in South Africa were educated at the University of Fort Hare, including former president Nelson Mandela. The university is also the repository of the archives of the African National Congress and documents and houses one of the most significant collections of African art.

== Victoria Hospital ==
Built in 1898, it is one of the oldest sites in Alice and still graces the town with its old charm of yesterday. Victoria Hospital is a large district hospital on the outskirts of Alice reconstructed and upgraded by the Eastern Cape Provincial Government between 2006 and 2011.

== History ==
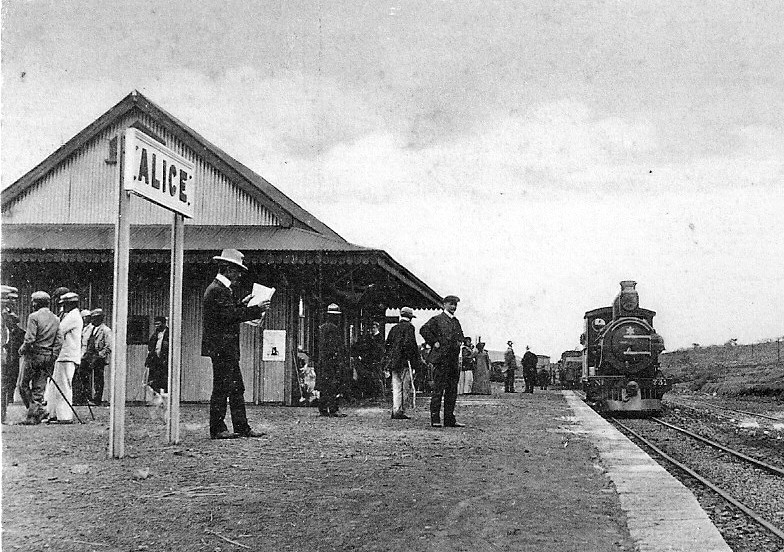
Alice railway station, c. 1900

The location was named Lovedale by European missionaries who settled there in 1824. It lies on the southwestern bank of the Tyhume River, west-northwest of East London, at an elevation of 1,720(524m). It was named after John Love of the Glasgow Missionary Society. During the Frontier War it was abandoned and the mission resettled on the west bank of the Tyhume River.

On the east bank a fort was built, called Fort Hare, after Major-General John Hare, who was lieutenant-governor of the Eastern Cape and acting governor of the Cape Colony. Later, the name of the town was changed to Alice. Alice was the administrative and magisterial capital of the old district of Victoria East. In 1847, it was named Alice by Sir Peregrine Maitland after Princess Alice, the second daughter of Queen Victoria. Municipal status was attained in 1852.The town is famous for producing the first Bible written in isiXhosa in 1823 at the Lovedale Press.

The town celebrated its 200th bicentennial birthday in 2024.

== Points of interest ==
- Lovedale Press, 1823–1861
- Fort Hare University, 1916
- Old Fort Monument, 1847
- Lovedale College, 1849
- Masonic Hall, 1911
- Victoria Memorial Hall, 1920
- Stewart Memorial
- Victoria Hospital, 1898
- ZK Mathews House, 1920
- Alice Trinity Church, 1914
- Presbyterian Church, 1849
- NGK Kerk, 1876
- Domira House, 1836

== Notable people ==
- Cecilia Makiwane-first black nurse in South Africa
- Naledi Pandor- politician
- Ngconde Balfour – politician
- John Knox Bokwe – writer/author
- William Wellington Gqoba – poet and journalist
- Sipho Burns-Ncamashe – politician
- John Tengo Jabavu – poet/writer
- Milner Langa Kabane – educator and newspaper editor
- Thandathu Jongilizwe Mabandla – Xhosa chief
- Nakhane Mahlakahlaka – author, actor, songwriter
- Z. K. Matthews – university teacher
- Chief Mqalo – oldest chief of the Rharhabe Kingdom
- Looksmart Ngudle – anti-apartheid activist
- Jerry Nqolo – cricket player
- Sanele Nohamba – professional rugby player
- Ntsikana – prophet and evangelist
- Walter Stanford – civil servant and politician
- Makhenkesi Stofile – politician
- George McCall Theal – historian, genealogist

== See also ==
- Lovedale Press
