= Victoria Hospital (Alice) =

Victoria Hospital, Alice
- Eastern Cape Department of Health

Geography
- Location: Alice, Eastern Cape, South Africa
- Coordinates: 32°46′37″S 26°50′46″E

Organisation
- Care system: Public
- Type: District/Community
- Affiliated university: Lilitha Nursing College; Fort Hare University

Services
- Emergency department: Yes
- Beds: 110

History
- Founded: 1898

Links
- Website: Eastern Cape Department of Health website - Amathole District Hospitals
- Other links: List of hospitals in South Africa

Victoria Hospital is a provincial government funded hospital for the Raymond Mhlaba Local Municipality area in Alice, Eastern Cape in South Africa.

The hospital departments include endocrinology, emergency department, paediatric ward, maternity ward, obstetrics/gynecology, outpatients department, surgical services, medical services, operating theatre & CSSD Services, pharmacy, anti-retroviral (ARV) treatment for HIV/AIDS, post trauma counselling Services, X-ray services, physiotherapy, NHLS Laboratory, oral health care providers, laundry services, kitchen services and mortuary.
