= Cecilia Makiwane Hospital =

- Eastern Cape Department of Health
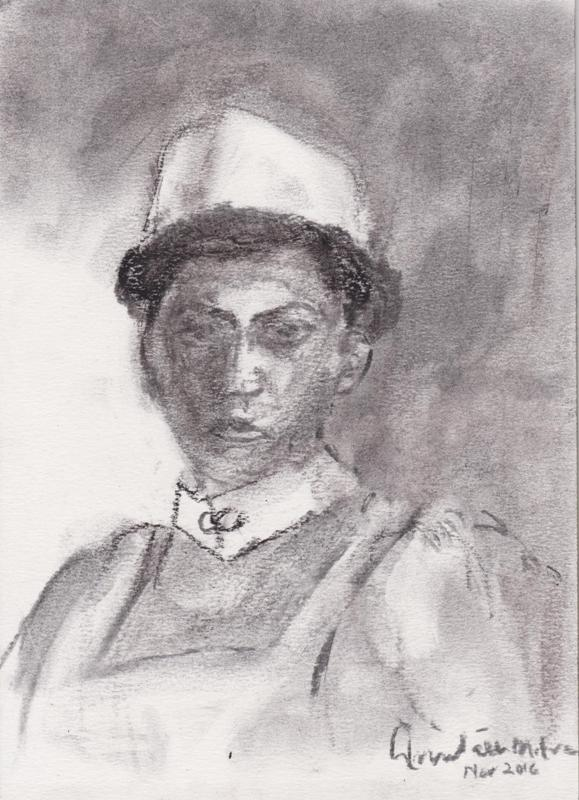
- Charcoal on Paper by Amitabh Mitra

Geography
- Location: Mdantsane, Buffalo City Metropolitan Municipality, Eastern Cape, South Africa
- Coordinates: 32°55′37″S 27°44′42″E

Organisation
- Care system: Public
- Type: District General, Teaching
- Affiliated university: Lilitha Nursing College; Walter Sisulu University
- Patron: Alphin Mbuso Mqalo

Services
- Emergency department: Yes, Major Trauma Centre
- Beds: 1,724

Links
- Website: Cecilia Makiwane Hospital
- Other links: List of hospitals in South Africa

Cecilia Makiwane Hospital (CMH) is a large, provincial, government-funded district general hospital situated in the Mdantsane township near East London, Eastern Cape in South Africa. It is a tertiary teaching hospital and forms part of the East London Hospital Complex with Frere Hospital. It is named after Cecilia Makiwane, the first African woman to become a professional nurse in South Africa.

== History ==
Health Minister Chief Mqalo renamed the Mdantsane Hospital to Cecilia Makiwane Hospital in 1977, to commemorate Cecilia Makiwane, the first Black nurse in South Africa. On 30 April 1982, the Department of Posts and Telecommunications of the Republic of Ciskei honoured her with a philatelic stamp and a first day cover, detailing her life.

The first Senior Medical Superintendent of the hospital was Dr Peter Edward Pistorius. Dr Pistorius took up this position in January 1974. Dr Pistorius was also the Acting Minister of Health in the Ciskei Government at the time of his death due to illness in January 1986.

The University of Cape Town honours and commemorates woman heroes of anti-apartheid struggle which includes Cecilia Makiwane. A charcoal portrait of Cecilia Makiwane done by Dr. Amitabh Mitra was exhibited at the Molly Blackburn Hall, University of Cape Town campus on the 19 September 2019.

== Departments and services ==
The hospital's departments include: Trauma and Emergency, Paediatrics, Obstetrics/Gynaecology, Surgery, Internal Medicine, ARV clinic for HIV/AIDS in adults and children, Anaesthetics, Paediatric Surgery, Family Medicine, Psychiatry, Dermatology, Otolaryngology (ENT), Ophthalmology and burns unit. The Orthopaedic department runs a weekly clinic.

Other facilities include an operating theatre, Intensive Care Unit (ICU) for adult, paediatric and neonatal patients, and high-care wards for general and obstetric patients. The hospital also offers allied health services such as physiotherapy, occupational therapy, speech and language therapy, psychology, social worker, dentistry and dietetics. Other services include CSSD Services, Pharmacy, Post Trauma Counselling Services, Occupational Services, X-Ray Services with Computed Tomography (CT) facility, National Health Laboratory Service (NHLS), blood bank and mortuary.

== New Cecilia Makiwane Hospital ==
The new Cecilia Makiwane Hospital was officially opened by the Deputy President of South Africa Cyril Ramaphosa on the 17 September 2017. Recently a demand to declare the Cecilia Makiwane Hospital as a heritage site and hospital has been made. The Cecilia Makiwane hospital, one of its kind continues to attract doctors and nurses from all corners of the globe.

== Thuthuzela Care Centre ==
A twenty-four-hour stand-around centre for the community of East London was installed in 1994. It was assisted by National Prosecuting Authority, Masimanaye Centre for Human Rights and Gender Violence, and the Provincial Department of Health. In spite of sustained efforts, the level of child sexual violence and rape in South Africa remains high. There is an acute shortage of medical examiners of rape victims. Dr. Amitabh Mitra was the Head of the Thuthuzela Care Centre and is an Ambassador to the Provincial Commissioner of Police Eastern Cape.
