= Amitabh Mitra =

Indo-South African physician, poet and artist

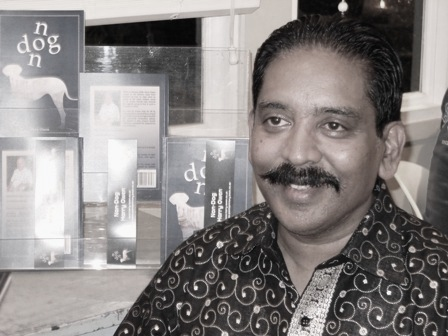
- Education: Gajara Raja Medical College (MBBS); University of Pretoria
- Occupations: Physician, poet, artist

Amitabh Mitra is an Indian-born South African physician, poet, and artist. He is known for his work in trauma surgery and sexual violence. He is also known for his poetry.

== Early life and education ==
Amitabh Mitra was born in Gwalior, India. He studied medicine and did postgraduate studies in orthopaedic surgery at the Gajara Raja Medical College, Gwalior, India. He further specialised in aerospace medicine and family medicine at the University of Pretoria, South Africa.

== Medical career ==
Now retired, Mitra, an orthopaedic surgeon, worked in trauma and sexual violence for more than thirty years in the Thuthuzela unit of the Cecilia Makiwane Hospital in Mdantsane. He has asked to make the Cecilia Makiwane Hospital a heritage site, taking into consideration that the hospital was named after Cecilia Makiwane, the first black nurse to have been registered in apartheid South Africa, and is situated in the second biggest black township of Mdantsane.

=== Rape crisis centres ===
Mitra headed the Thuthuzela department for aiding, examining, and collecting evidence from victims of rape and sexual assaults. The Thutuzela system has been accepted by many African and South Asian countries. Mitra believes that such vital centres should not be attached to the Department of Emergency Medicine but kept as a separate entity for quicker and better functioning. The Thuthuzela Centres for assisting victims of Rape and Sexual Assaults are in crisis mode after US President Donald Trump cut USAID in South Africa in January 2025. The standalone 24-hour examination centres wer unable to work, and the counsellors who were being paid through USAID, faced unemployment. For almost four decades, Mitra treated patients in difficult and underserved regions, working through the HIV/AIDS epidemic, the final years of apartheid and South Africa’s transition to democracy. His role later expanded beyond hospital wards as he became closely involved in investigating sexual assault cases and helping survivors navigate the criminal justice system As head of the centre, Mitra oversaw work ranging from medical examinations and forensic evidence collection to expert testimony during trials. He was also given the rank of Colonel in the South African Police Service. Mitra said his evidence and court testimony helped secure convictions in approximately 2,800 rape cases. A number of the convicts were sentenced to life imprisonment or consecutive life terms. "South Africa does not have the death penalty, and its courts can impose lengthy or multiple life sentences in particularly serious cases. In such cases, the possibility of parole may be severely restricted," Dr Mitra said.

=== Trauma surgery ===
Mitra's work in trauma surgery took him to Bhutan, where he worked at high-altitude hospitals of Chukha, Tsimalakha, Chimakothi and Thimphu under severe conditions. During these times he wrote poems about Bhutan, some of which were translated into French. He wrote about his adventures in his search for the utopian Shangri La.

Khushwant Singh, the former editor of The Illustrated Weekly of India visited him to his hospital in Bhutan and wrote about him in his weekly columns, "With Malice Towards One and All" in the Times of India during the 1980s. Mitra later went to Arunachal Pradesh, where he joined as an orthopaedic surgeon at Along.

In 1993 he became an orthopaedic surgeon at Bulawayo, Zimbabwe. He lived in Bulawayo's Mzilikazi township and narrated his experiences during the time of political turmoil.

=== HIV/Aids ===
In June 2026 Mitra wrote a column in the Daily Dispatch about his work with HIV/AIDS, and how new medicines such as the now freely-available Lenacapavir, are helping to cure or help people living with the disease. He writes that giving prophylactic anti-viral drugs to rape survivors in the Thuthuzela centres is not enough, for "medicines cannot alone fix the job; socioeconomic realities, persistent stigma and the urgent need for curative research must remain central to our response...We must use every available measure, prevention, treatment and human compassion to protect lives and restore human dignity".

=== Sports medicine ===
Mitra's close interest in sports medicine has assisted boxers in Mdantsane, a black township known for producing world boxing champions. Mitra was medical advisor and surgeon to Zolani Tete and gave him the medical clearance needed to fight the Commonwealth Championship in UK March 2022.

== Art and poetry ==
Mitra's art is often focused on Mdantsane; where he works at the Cecilia Makiwane Hospital. Mdantsane Breathing is his book on the art and poetry of Mdantsane.

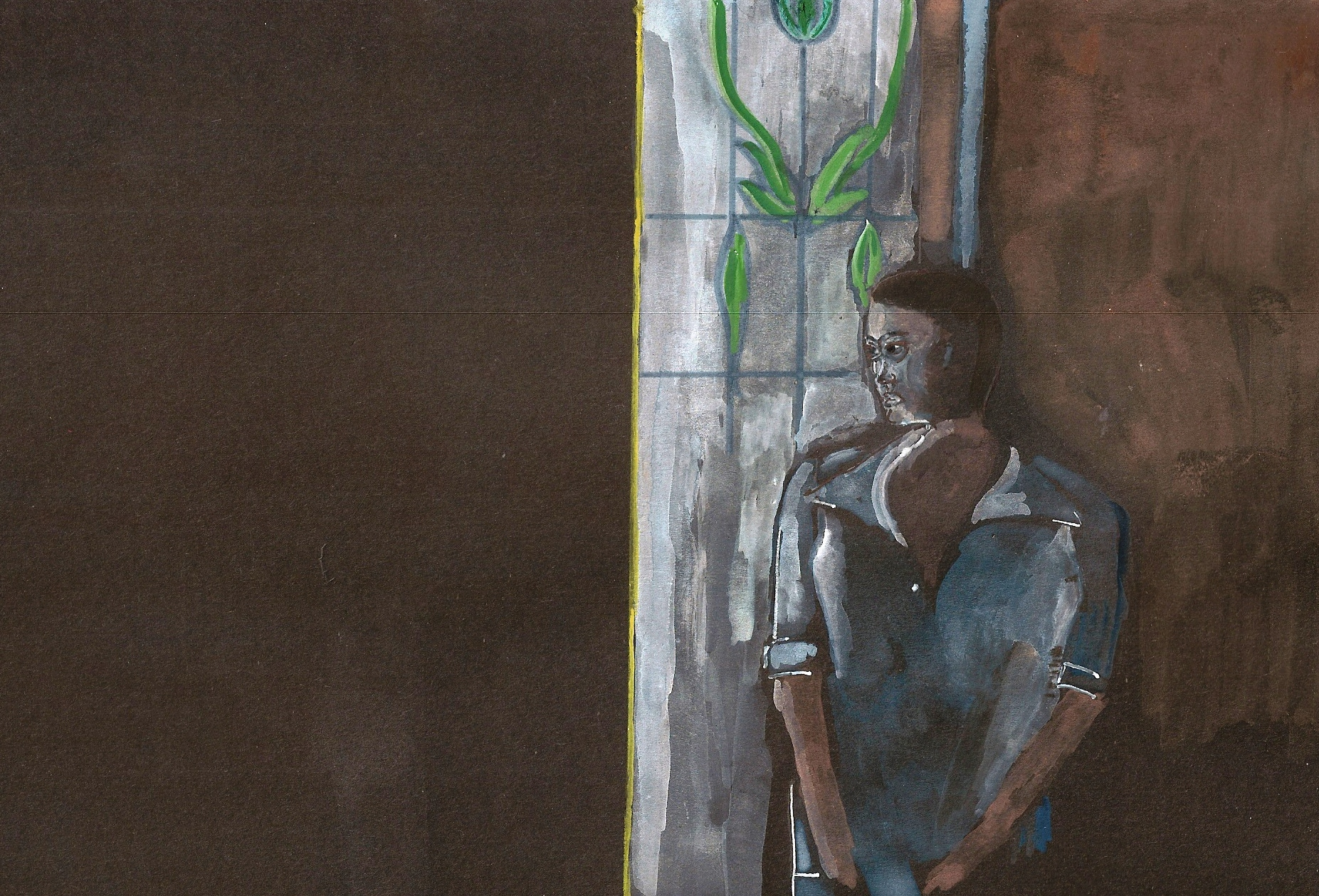
Tembeka, A watercolour on a handmade paper by Mitra

A major section of Mitra's work on art and poetry is devoted to Gwalior, where he grew up. His close friendship with the Maratha royal families resulted in his drawing a series of watercolour involving poetry which he exhibited in South Africa and India. A Slow Train to Gwalior is a coffee-table book of his art and poetry; a compact disc of his recitation with a backdrop of African traditional music was released by the Premier of Eastern Cape, Nosimo Balindlela, and a short documentary film on his Gwalior poetry was shown at the Grahamstown National Arts Festival in 2009. In 2007 he was invited by the Sahitya Akademi, New Delhi, where he presented his work to a poetry-loving audience. A CD called A Slow Train to Gwalior was released in 2007.

He translated the Bengali poetry of the late Prabhatkiran Bose, well known children's author in Bengal during the 1950s.

Mitra's art and poetry on the township of Mdantsane, South Africa, was exhibited at the 2011 International Symposium for Poetry and Medicine and Hippocrates Prize for Poetry and Medicine Awards on Saturday, 7 May 2011, entitled Poems from Cecilia Makiwane Hospital.

He co-edited (with Naomi Nkealah) Splinters of a Mirage Dawn, An Anthology of Migrant Poetry of South Africa (2016). His poetry collection, Anarchy and the Sea (2021) encompasses feelings experienced during the COVID-19 pandemic in South Africa, as well as the violence and trauma he encounters in emergency medicine.

Mitra gifted the charcoal portrait done by him of Neil Aggett on 21 March 2019 at the 13th Annual Neil Aggett Memorial Lecture at Kingswood College, Grahamstown. The University of Cape Town honours and commemorates woman heroes of anti-apartheid struggle which includes Cecilia Makiwane. A charcoal portrait of Cecilia Makiwane done by Mitra was exhibited at the Molly Blackburn Hall, University of Cape Town campus, on 19 September 2019.

Mitra and Zena Velloo John edited a book of poems titled Anthology of Women Poets of India and South Africa, Feminism, Reflections in Contemporary Politics. The book was launched at the Jaipur Literature and Arts Conclave, Gwalior, on 19 December 2022. The pair also edited a book titled Writings of South Africans of Indian Origin, which describes the indenture of Indians brought by a ship named Umalazi from the coasts of Madras to sugar cane plantations of KwaZulu-Natal to work forcibly. Shweta Sahay, in his review, compared the book to the writings of V.S. Naipaul and Amitav Ghosh.

His poetry is included in Travelogue : The Grand Indian Express (2018) ed. by Anand Kumar and published by Authorspress, New Delhi.

== Other activities ==
Mitra lectures on aesthetic values of art in medicine and pushes actively to add art as a subject in the graduate curriculum of medicine and surgery in universities worldwide. His core interests are on burnt-out Accident and Emergency doctors and rejuvenating them through art.

Mitra was the National Secretary General of South African Foreign Qualified Doctors' Association, consisting of 3,800 foreign-qualified specialists and doctors who, after the fusion of former Bantustans into the new Republic of South Africa, were not given due recognition. Mitra fought a legal battle for the rightful acceptance and registration they deserved. Such doctors and their families suffered a professional and social trauma and most of them decided to leave for the United Kingdom, Australia, and Canada. a 1996 article in The Mail & Guardian said that of the 3,800 foreign qualified doctors in 1996, only 50 of such doctors remained in South Africa, still not recognised and on a limited registration.

== Recognition and honours ==
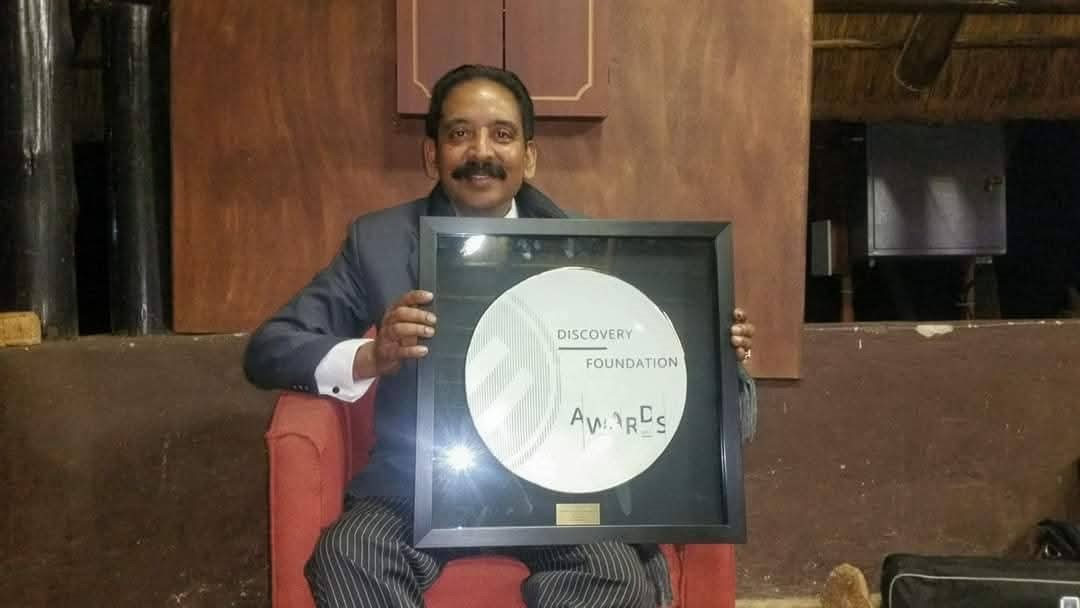
Discovery Foundation Award 2018 on research on Epidemiology of Interpersonal Violence in the township of Mdantsane

Mitra represented South Africa at the World Literature Festival in Oslo in 2008.

Splinters of a Mirage Dawn, An Anthology of Migrant Poetry of South Africa which he co-edited with Naomi Nkealah, was shortlisted for the National Humanities and Social Sciences Award in 2016.

Mitra received the Discovery Foundation Award for research in the rural category in 2018. His scholarship amounted to R100,000 for his research work titled "Epidemiology of Interpersonal Violence at a regional hospital Emergency Unit in the Eastern Cape South Africa".

On 15 December 2018, Mitra received the Provincial Eastern Cape Minister of Art and Culture's Special Award in the category of Fine Arts for his continued dedication to South African Arts.

The 2021 National Arts Festival in Grahamstown honoured Mitra by making a short film on his visual art and reasons for fusing Arts with Medicine. Three of Mitra's poetry films were selected and screened on 12 October 2021 at Durban International Film Festival and Poetry Africa, followed by a discussion. He was also selected to present his work at the Madibaland @ Bookbedonnerd World Literary Festival on 3 November 2022.

On 30 November 2022, Mitra received the South African Police Service Provincial Commissioner's Ambassador Award at the Eastern Cape Excellence Awards at Port Elizabeth.

He was honoured on 30 June 2024 at Johannesburg by the Bengali Association of South Africa in the presence of the Indian High Commissioner for his continuous work of more than thirty years in Mdantsane. A special mention was made of his contribution to poetry and visual art during this period. He narrated his work with the African National Congress in 1979 to 1983 with Moosa Moolla, Chief Representative of the African National Congress to India at Delhi.

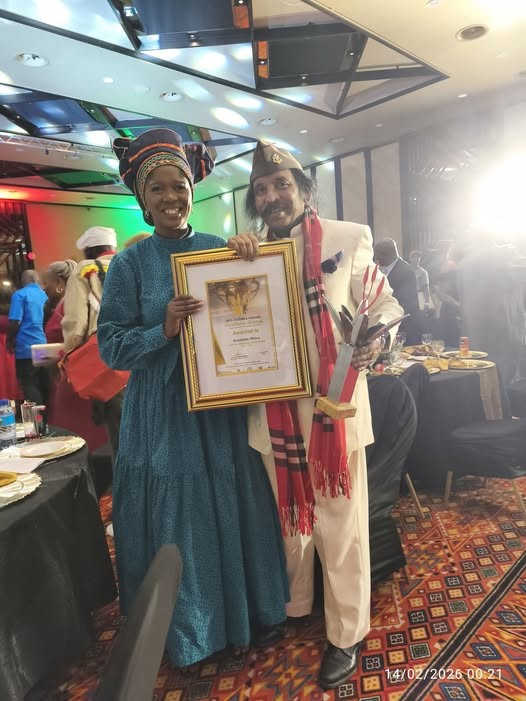
Eastern Cape, South Africa Poetry Award, 13 February 2026 by Minister Sibulele Ngongo

On 2 February 2025, the Department of Orthopaedics held a National Congress of Reunion of all specialist doctors who passed out of the JA Group of hospitals in Gwalior. Mitra was declared as the Star of the Orthopaedic Department.

Mitra is included in the African Poetry Digital Portal, an extensive detail of African Poets who have made their presence felt

Mitra received the Poetry Award of excellence at the Sun Group of Hotels in Bizana. The award was presented to him by the Minister of Art and Culture, Sibulele Ngongo and he was declared the sole winner of this award.

== Bibliography ==
=== Poetry ===
- Bithika – 1978
- Ritual Silences – 1980
- A Slow Train to Gwalior – 2009
- Leaping the Lilac Sun – 2009
- Mdantsane Breathing – 2010
- Poems for Haiti, A South African Anthology (Foreword by Professor Peter Horn) – 2010
- Unbreaking the Rainbow, Voices of Protest from New South Africa (Foreword by Ela Gandhi) – 2012
- Splinters of a Mirage Dawn, Anthology of Migrant Poetry from South Africa (co-edited with Naomi Nkealah) (Art by Arpana Caur) – 2013
- Stranger than a Sun, Poems and Drawings of Gwalior – 2015
- Trainstorm, An Anthology of Alternative Train Poetry – 2016
- Anarchy and the Sea, (Poems and Seascapes of Amitabh Mitra) – 2021
- Anthology of Women Poets of India and South Africa (co-edited with Zena Velloo John ) – 2022
- Writings of South Africans of Indian Origin(Edited by Amitabh Mitra and Zena Velloo John) - 7 May 2025

=== Editor ===
- A Hudson View, A Quarterly Print Poetry Journal
- Inyathi, A Journal on South African Arts
