= Mdantsane =

Township in the Eastern Cape, South Africa

- Township
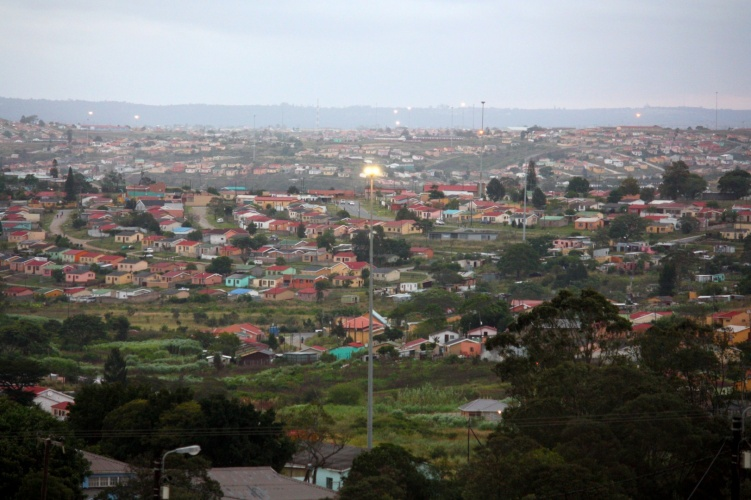
- The township near East London, Eastern Cape
- Interactive map of Mdantsane
- Country: South Africa
- Province: Eastern Cape
- Municipality: Buffalo City
- Established: 1940

Population (2020)
  - Total: 154,576

Racial makeup (2011)
  - Black: 70.1 %
  - Coloured: 30.1 %
  - Indian/Asian: 0.1 %
  - White: 0.1 %

First languages (2011)
  - Xhosa: 90.0 %
  - English: 20.1 %
  - Afrikaans: 16.1 %
  - Other: 3.8%
- Time zone: UTC+2 (SAST)
- Postal code (street): 5219
- PO Box: 5219

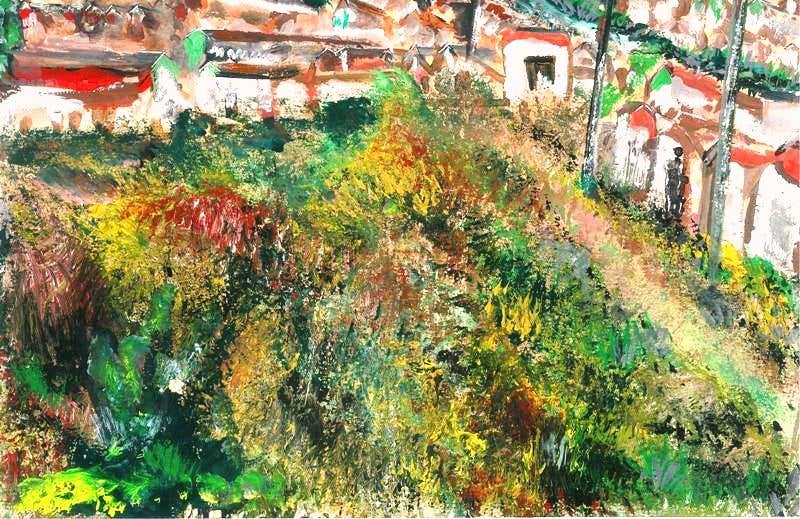
- Art by Amitabh Mitra

Mdantsane is a South African urban township situated 15 km away from East London and 37 km away from Qonce in the Eastern Cape. It is the second largest township in Eastern Cape and 17th largest in the Top 20 largest townships in South Africa.

The name Mdantsane was derived from a stream that ran from the Nahoon River down to the Buffalo River. Some believe the stream was called Dontsane. Soon after the stream was named, a "white farm" which was at the entrance of Mdantsane (now known as Zone 1) was also named after the stream Dontsane or Umdanzani.

The township is part of the Buffalo City Metropolitan Municipality in the Eastern Cape. The Mdantsane township is the second largest township in the Eastern Cape, by population.

== History ==
=== Establishment ===
In the 1940s, living quarters for African East London workers were hard to find. The implementation of the Group Areas Act of 1950 further entrenched racial segregation in East London. Unhygienic conditions, overcrowding and riots became matters of concern in Duncan Village, a township which had been created for the African population in the 1940s. The apartheid government recommended that Amalinda, a white suburb not very far from Mdantsane, should be zoned as a black area in 1957. However, the white residents of Amalinda, who wanted the area to be retained as a white zone, strongly opposed this recommendation.

In the same year, the East London municipality received an instruction from the apartheid South African government to submit an application for a new township for its African residents. On February 20, the Minister of the Department of Bantu Administration and Development announced that the entire African population of East London was to be moved to a new site called Mdantsane, which was within the boundaries of the Xhosa native reserve under the administration of the Ciskei Territorial Authority which had been set up in 1961.

The first houses were built in late 1963 with removals planned for 1964. However, removals and resettlement began in 1963. Mdantsane was formally established in 1963 on a farm called “ Umdanzani” and the first 300 residents occupied the new houses. The original inhabitants were people who were forcibly removed from what was known as East Bank in East London.

In 1964, approximately 112 000 people from Duncan Village were forcibly moved to the outskirts of Mdantsane township. Mdantsane was recognised as a homeland town under the bantustan of Ciskei in 1966.

=== Township in independent Ciskei ===
Ciskei became self-governing in 1972 and then granted nominal independence on 4 December 1981, with Mdantsane becoming one of the homeland's largest townships.

To encourage African residents of Duncan Village and East London to relocate to Mdantsane, the apartheid government adopted a number of strategies. The first was to introduce the Regional Decentralisation Programme (RIDP) in the 1960s which saw the establishment of clothing, food, furniture and building accessory factories on the border of East London, particularly in Wilsonia and at Fort Jackson in Mdantsane. These industries provided employment opportunities to the Mdantsane residents. To keep these industries operational, the government offered generous industrial subsidies and incentives. By the end of the 1980s, about 30,000 and 7,500 jobs respectively were available in Wilsonia and Fort Jackson.

However, low wages, the rise of trade unions and lack of funding in the early 1990s led to the collapse of these factories. To further create the illusion of Mdantsane as an ideal township for Africans, apartheid government then added social services and facilities such as Rubusana Training College, and the Cecilia Makiwane Hospital, and subsidised road and rail transport.

=== Egerton Massacre ===
On 13 July 1983, the Ciskei Transport Corporation (CTC) introduced an 11% (50 cent) bus fare increase on the route between East London and Mdantsane. To discuss the issue of the bus fare increment, a meeting with 1000 people was held in a church hall in Duncan Village on 10 July 1983. A committee of ten workers known as the "Committee of Ten" was elected to represent the community's interests to the CTC. The Committee of Ten tried to meet CTC management on Monday 11 July. The CTC refused on the grounds that they had already talked to community leaders two months before the increases were announced. A second mass meeting was held on 12 July in Duncan Village. About 3000 people attended. The CTC responses were rejected and a decision was taken to boycott the CTC buses. On 18 July, the bus boycott began. The commuters initially walked to work in large groups, from Mdantsane across the Ciskei border to East London, a distance of about twenty kilometres. On its second day, the boycott attracted over 80% of the bus commuters.

The number of police soon increased as reinforcements were brought in, and they became more brutal. To avoid harassment from the police, the commuters began to use the trains. The railway, which formed Ciskei's border with the rest of South Africa, was run by the South African Transport Services and located on the outskirts of Mdantsane. The train fares were marginally lower than the bus fares and provided a space for commuters to discuss issues affecting the community. The train fares increased on 1 August 1983 but the commuters continued to use trains.

Security forces from the Ciskei government set up roadblocks in Mdantsane, and there were reports of commuters being hauled out of taxis and ordered onto buses. On 22 July 1983, five people were shot and wounded by Ciskei security forces at the Fort Jackson railway station. On 30 July, a man was attacked and killed by vigilantes while walking near the Mdantsane stadium. On 3 August, a state of emergency was declared in Mdantsane and a night curfew was imposed. Meetings of more than four people were banned and people were prohibited from walking in groups larger than four.

The Ciskei government police and soldiers formed an armed human blockade at the Fort Jackson, Mount Ruth and Ergeton train stations to prevent commuters from catching the train on 4 August 1983. The commuters moved a few paces forward. The police drew their guns and the people stopped. Without warning the police fired into the crowd. 11 people lost their lives and 36 were injured. The soldiers prevented people from going into the hospital's casualty ward to find the dead. The Ciskei government intensified its security measures, arresting 700 people in a week. By the end of August 1983, over 1000 people were in jail. The incident is known as the Egerton Bus Boycott Massacre. To commemorate the day, former South African deputy president Kgalema Motlanthe unveiled the upgraded Egerton Bus Boycott Massacre Memorial in Site in memory of the victims of the massacre on 24 September 2013.

The events are referred to in the song "Mdantsane - (Mud Coloured Dusty Blood)" on Juluka's sixth album Work For All.

== Today ==
Mdantsane is divided into eighteen zones which are still expanding, with the newest units known as Unit P and eMbekweni. The zones are named numerically in the chronological order of their establishment. The central market, in N.U.2 (Zone 2) district is colloquially called "The Hi-way". It is named after Qumza Highway, which is the main road that runs from the East London CBD through Duncan Village, Buffalo Flats, Scenery Park, Wilsonia and Mdantsane and terminating in the industrial zone, Fort Jackson. Here many informal traders sell their wares on the streets and it is also the location of the main taxi rank. There is also formal trading which is housed in the recently built shopping malls. A pulsating culture in music, arts and poetry continues to thrive in this close-knit township life.

Mdantsane was the home of several figures from the anti-Apartheid struggle, including Monde Mkunqwana who was imprisoned in 1963 for a supposed attempted assassination against Transkei leader Kaiser Matanzima; the lawyer Louis Mtshizana; ANC activist Matta Don Molteno who was banned by the Apartheid government in 1976; and Mzimkulu "Dabana" Gwentshe of the National African Youth Organisation (NAYO) who was imprisoned on Robben Island in 1964.

After a quarrel with his girlfriend, Bulelani Vukwana shot and killed 11 people and injured a further six in a spree killing on February 9, 2002. He later committed suicide.

Cecilia Makiwane Hospital is a 1,724-bed multidisciplinary hospital in Mdantsane. It was named after Cecilia Makiwane, the first black registered nurse in South Africa. Along with Frere Hospital and the East London Mental Health Unit, it forms part of the East London Hospital Complex, which serves a population of almost three million people.

== Demographics ==
The language spoken in Mdantsane is Xhosa, however English or Afrikaans is spoken as a second language by the inhabitants. The majority of Mdantsane's residents subsist below the living wage, according to the government's economic classifications. However, there is a growing middle class in Mdantsane.

== Entertainment ==
- Knuckle City

== Sports ==
Mdantsane is home to the Sisa Dukashe Stadium, a multi-purpose soccer and rugby stadium opened in 1973. The stadium has hosted the SuperSport Rugby Challenge and is also an alternative home ground to the Port Elizabeth Premier Soccer League outfit Chippa United. The stadium hosts a number of boxing tournaments and local music events during the year.

Mdantsane has produced 50 national and 23 international boxing champions, including the former IBF super bantamweight champion Vuyani "The Beast" Bungu, IBF world bantamweight champion Welcome Ncita, WBO light flyweight champion Masibulele “Hawk” Makepula, former IBF Champion Noni Tenge, and Zolani Tete. Many successful boxing coaches, including Balekile Sam and Mzimasi Mnguni, have also come from Mdantsane.

Njabulo Ndebele describes boxing as a core element in the township's culture. "Boxing is a street sport in Mdantsane..All the world champions started boxing from the streets, in the classrooms of Mdantsane’s school...For the young men boxing is ‘a field we ploughed with no skills and resources’...It’s part of the community culture, and entertainment. It has also given the community of Mdantsane a sense of communal identity.” In April 2016, South African billionaire Patrice Motsepe donated R1 million worth of gym equipment is to be distributed to 57 clubs in Mdantsane.

== Art of Mdantsane ==
Many visual artists of Mdantsane have exhibited their works in East London and abroad. Dr Amitabh Mitra, a visual artist, English poet and an orthopaedic surgeon has exhibited his multiple works on life in Mdantsane in solo and group exhibitions in East London and abroad.

== Transport ==
The N2 freeway skirts Mdantsane to the north leading eastwards to KuGompo City and westwards to Qonce.

The R102 regional route which was the historic main road between Qonce and East London prior to the construction of the N2 leads south-eastwards to East London and north-westwards to Ntabozuko and Qonce.

Mdantsane Access Road (also called Qumza Highway) also serves as a linkage between Mdantsane and KuGompo City, running parallel to the R102. Unlike the N2 and R102, this route runs towards the city centre of KuGompo City rather than the northern suburbs.

== Famous residents ==
- Vuyani Bungu - professional boxer, former IBF junior-featherweight & IBO featherweight champion
- Hlomla Dandala - actor. Born in Mdantsane
- Siba Mtongana - celebrity chef and television presenter
- Dali Mpofu - lawyer and politician, former National Chairperson of the Economic Freedom Fighters
- Tats Nkonzo, comedian
- Jahmil X.T. Qubeka - film director, screenwriter, and producer
- Welcome Ncita - professional boxer and former IBF Super Bantamweight champion
- Nomafrench Mbombo - Western Cape Provincial Minister of Health: since 2015, Member of the Western Cape Provincial Parliament
- Zolani Tete - professional boxer
- Nkosinathi Joyi - professional boxer, former IBF Minimumweight world champion
- Ali Funeka - professional boxer, former IBO welterweight world champion
- Zolani Marali - professional boxer, International Boxing Organization (IBO) superfeatherweight boxing champion
- Nosiviwe Mapisa-Nqakula - cabinet minister in the South African Government
- Mazibuko Jara - activist, co-founder of Amandla (magazine)
- Amitabh Mitra - physician, poet and artist
- Masande Ntshanga - novelist, short story writer, poet, editor and publisher
