= Buffalo City Metropolitan Municipality =

Buffalo City
- Metropolitan municipality
- Buffalo City Metropolitan Municipality
- Seal

- Location in the Eastern Cape
- Coordinates: 32°59′S 27°52′E
- Country: South Africa
- Province: Eastern Cape
- Seat: KuGompo City
- Wards: 50

Government
  - Type: Municipal council
  - Mayor: Princess Faku (ANC)
  - Deputy Mayor: Vacant
  - Speaker: Humphrey Maxhegwana
  - Chief Whip: Mawethu Marata (ANC)

Area
  - Total: 2,753 km^{2} (1,063 sq mi)

Population (2022)
  - Total: 975,255
  - Density: 354.3/km^{2} (917.5/sq mi)

Racial makeup (2022)
  - Black African: 84.7%
  - Coloured: 5.2%
  - Indian/Asian: 1.0%
  - White: 8.4%

First languages (2011)
  - Xhosa: 78.8%
  - English: 11.0%
  - Afrikaans: 7.2%
  - Other: 3%
- Time zone: UTC+2 (SAST)
- Municipal code: BUF

The Buffalo City Metropolitan Municipality (Xhosa: uMasipala oMbaxa wase Buffalo City) is a metropolitan municipality situated on the east coast of the Eastern Cape province of South Africa. It includes the towns of KuGompo City, Bhisho and Qonce, as well as the large townships of Mdantsane and Zwelitsha.

== History ==
The municipality was established as a local municipality in 2000 after South Africa's reorganisation of municipal areas, and is named after the Buffalo River, at whose mouth lies the only river port in South Africa. On 18 May 2011, it was separated from the Amathole District Municipality and converted into a metropolitan municipality.

The area has a well-developed manufacturing base, with the auto industry playing a major role. Daimler AG through its wholly owned subsidiary Mercedes-Benz South Africa (MBSA) has a large assembly plant located next to the port of East London, which produces a variety of vehicles for export.

The climate is mild, with year-round sunshine. Average rainfall is 850mm (33.5 inches).

The population of 701,873 (2001) is largely African (85.2%), with White (8.4%) and Coloured (5.7%) minorities. There is also a small Indian community (0.6%).

The previous mayor, Dr Sindisile Maclean (ANC), was elected in 2000. Buffalo City elected its first female mayor on Friday, 17 March 2006. Ntombentle Peter was voted in as Executive Mayor at the inaugural meeting of the new council following the municipal elections.

== Main places ==
The 2011 census divided the municipality into the following main places:

Note: Only the most populated places are reported

Place	Code	Area (km^{2})	Population
Berlin	260060	38.22	3,048
Bhisho	260032	8.08	11,192
Bulembu	260065	1.63	1,212
Dimbaza	260039	17.28	21,783
Ducats	260102	1.24	3,546
Duncan Village	260114	0.90	16,380
East London	260113	168.86	267,007
Eluxolweni	260062	8.51	15,300
Ententeni	260139	0.84	2,731
eSingeni	260048	2.60	1,343
Ginsberg	260073	2.39	10,766
Gompo	260133	0.53	2,254
Gonubie	260106	10.11	11,471
Goodhope	260137	4.06	2,127
iKhiwane	260165	1.38	1,039
Ilitha	260061	5.64	8,145
Izeleni	260098	2.11	1,187
Jaftas	260106	0.68	442
Kayser's Beach	260178	2.36	697
Kidd's Beach	260160	2.13	499
Qonce	260044	65.52	34,019
Kuni	260136	6.14	2,179
KwaBhonke	260091	1.19	1,174
KwaLini	260074	1.13	1,696
KwaMasingata	260045	1.11	1,204
KwaMlakalaka	260108	0.96	1,279
KwaMpundu	260055	5.19	1,544
KwaNoncampa	260077	1.30	1,552
KwaQongqotha	260118	1.32	1,425
KwaRhayi	260072	0.75	1,144
KwaTshatshu	260085	6.68	4,719
Kwetyana	260054	18.42	5,863
Macleantown	260016	9.94	580
Embekweni	260083	0.53	7,123
Mdantsane	260088	45.55	156,835
Modaka	260036	0.95	1,745
Mzamonhle	260107	2.49	8,338
Nxarhuni Dam Settlement	260078	0.93	131
Ncalukeni	260056	2.13	1,892
Needs Camp	260129	7.41	6,696
Ngxwalane	260075	1.61	1,027
Nkqonkqweni A	260007	1.00	1,546
Nomgwadla	260040	3.15	2,384
Nompumelelo	260112	0.73	7,269
Nkqonkqweni	260066	3.52	1,766
Nxarhuni	260068	2.64	1,481
Pefferville	260114	0.94	16,380
Phakamisa	260103	2.32	6,602
Pirie Mission	21446	0.74	356
Potsdam East	260113	1.25	1,664
Potsdam South	260114	8.02	5,329
Potsdam Village	260103	4.14	5,649
Sandile	260161	2.78	855
Sea Vale	260103	0.17	291
Silverdale	260132	4.00	647
Sunrise-on-Sea	260092	0.68	655
Tshabo 2	260095	2.67	1,114
Tyusha	260103	2.16	1,289
Tyutyu	260043	3.58	2,676
Umzantsi	260050	0.99	1,373
Zabalaza	260037	1.72	1,188
Zwelitsha	260086	4.64	18,189
Remainder of the municipality	260010	1867.19	10,359

== Politics ==
The municipal council consists of one hundred members elected by mixed-member proportional representation. Fifty councillors are elected by first-past-the-post voting in fifty wards, while the remaining fifty are chosen from party lists so that the total number of party representatives is proportional to the number of votes received. In the election of 4 November 2026 the African National Congress (ANC) lost its majority for the first time, but remains the largest party.

The following table shows the results of the election.

Party	Ward			List			Total seats
Party	Votes	%	Seats	Votes	%	Seats	Total seats
African National Congress	104,916	42.18	38	103,657	41.69	4	42
United Democratic Movement	40,645	16.34	3	50,818	20.44	16	19
Democratic Alliance	42,917	17.25	6	40,907	16.45	11	17
Economic Freedom Fighters	17,668	7.10	2	16,082	6.47	5	7
South African Communist Party	11,856	4.77	1	10,268	4.13	4	5
African Transformation Movement	5,363	2.16	0	4,795	1.93	2	2
Patriotic Alliance	4,299	1.73	0	4,124	1.66	2	2
ActionSA	4,387	1.76	0	3,742	1.50	2	2
Freedom Front Plus	3,142	1.26	0	3,333	1.34	1	1
uMkhonto weSizwe Party	2,877	1.16	0	1,676	0.67	1	1
Pan Africanist Congress of Azania	1,745	0.70	0	1,502	0.60	1	1
African Independent Congress	1,535	0.62	0	1,244	0.50	1	1
Independent candidates	421	0.17	0				0
17 other parties	6,955	2.80	0	6,512	2.62	0	0
Total	248,726	100.00	50	248,660	100.00	50	100
Valid votes	248,726	98.02		248,660	98.16		
Invalid/blank votes	5,026	1.98		4,665	1.84		
Total votes	253,752	100.00		253,325	100.00		
Registered voters/turnout	458,695	55.32		458,695	55.23		

== Hospitals ==
The following hospitals are located in the municipal area:

- Bhisho Provincial Hospital
- Cecilia Makiwane Hospital (Mdantsane)
- Duncan Village Day Hospital
- East London Private Hospital
- Fort Grey TB Hospital
- Frere Hospital
- Grey Provincial Hospital (Qonce)
- Grey Monument Private Clinic (Qonce)
- Life Beacon Bay Hospital
- Mount Coke Hospital (replaced by Bhisho Hospital in December 1991)
- Nkqubela Chest Hospital (Mdantsane)
- Royal Buffalo Specialist Hospital
- St Dominic’s Hospital
- St James Hospital
- St Marks Clinic

== Town twinning ==
Buffalo City's town twins are:

- Gävle, Sweden
- Leiden, Netherlands
- Milwaukee County, United States of America
